= 2026 Illinois Senate election =

2026 Illinois Senate elections
- November 3, 2026

39 of 59 seats in the Illinois Senate 30 seats needed for a majority
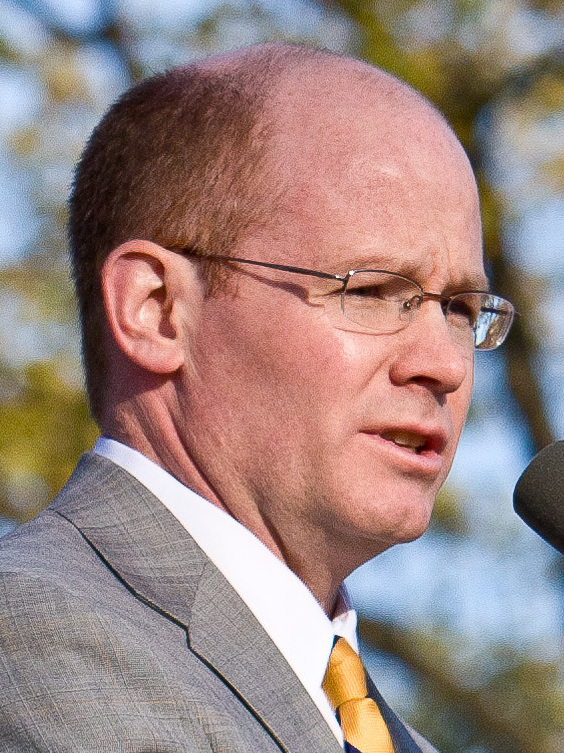

	Majority party	Minority party
Leader	Don Harmon	John Curran
Party	Democratic	Republican
Leader's seat	39th district	41st district
Last election	40	19
Seats won	45	14
Seat change	▲5	▼5
- Democratic incumbent Democratic incumbent retiring Republican incumbent Republican incumbent retiring No election
Senate President before election
Don Harmon
Democratic
Elected Senate President
TBD

The 2026 Illinois Senate election was held on November 3, 2026, to elect members of the Illinois Senate from two-thirds of districts.

== Retirements ==
=== Democratic ===
1. District 9: Laura Fine is retiring to run for the U.S. House of Representatives in Illinois's 9th congressional district.
2. District 27: Mark L. Walker is retiring.

=== Republican ===
1. District 33: Don DeWitte is retiring.
2. District 59: Dale Fowler is retiring.

== Predictions ==
Source	Ranking	As of
Sabato's Crystal Ball	Safe D	January 22, 2026
State Navigate	Safe D	October 20, 2026

== Summary of results by district ==
Only districts holding an election in 2026 are listed below.

- † denotes a retiring incumbent.

District	Incumbent	Party	Elected Senator	Outcome
2	Omar Aquino	Dem	Omar Aquino	Dem Hold
3	Mattie Hunter	Dem	Mattie Hunter	Dem Hold
5	Lakesia Collins	Dem	Lakesia Collins	Dem Hold
6	Sara Feigenholtz	Dem	Sara Feigenholtz	Dem Hold
8	Ram Villivalam	Dem	Ram Villivalam	Dem Hold
9	Laura Fine†	Dem	Patrick Hanley	Dem Hold
11	Mike Porfirio	Dem	Mike Porfirio	Dem Hold
12	Celina Villanueva	Dem	Celina Villanueva	Dem Hold
14	Emil Jones III	Dem	Emil Jones III	Dem Hold
15	Napoleon Harris	Dem	Napoleon Harris	Dem Hold
17	Elgie Sims	Dem	Elgie Sims	Dem Hold
18	Bill Cunningham	Dem	Frances Ann Hurley	Dem Hold
20	Graciela Guzmán	Dem	Graciela Guzmán	Dem Hold
21	Laura Ellman	Dem	Laura Ellman	Dem Hold
23	Suzy Glowiak	Dem	Suzy Glowiak	Dem Hold
24	Seth Lewis	Rep	Ben McAdams	Dem Gain
26	Darby Hills	Rep	Nabeela Syed	Dem Gain
27	Mark L. Walker†	Dem	Carina Santa Maria	Dem Hold
29	Julie Morrison	Dem	Julie Morrison	Dem Hold
30	Adriane Johnson	Dem	Adriane Johnson	Dem Hold
32	Craig Wilcox	Rep	Karen Battaglia	Dem Gain
33	Don DeWitte†	Rep	Michele Clark	Dem Gain
35	Dave Syverson	Rep		
36	Michael Halpin	Dem	Michael Halpin	Dem Hold
38	Sue Rezin	Rep		
39	Don Harmon	Dem	Don Harmon	Dem Hold
41	John Curran	Rep	John Curran	Rep Hold
42	Linda Holmes	Dem	Jared Ploger	Dem Hold
44	Sally Turner	Rep	Sally Turner	Rep Hold
45	Andrew Chesney	Rep	Andrew Chesney	Rep Hold
47	Neil Anderson	Rep	Neil Anderson	Rep Hold
48	Doris Turner	Dem	Doris Turner	Dem Hold
50	Jil Tracy	Rep	Jil Tracy	Rep Hold
51	Chapin Rose	Rep	Chapin Rose	Rep Hold
53	Chris Balkema	Rep	Chris Balkema	Rep Hold
54	Steve McClure	Rep	Steve McClure	Rep Hold
56	Erica Harriss	Rep	Marsia Geldert-Murphey	Dem Gain
57	Christopher Belt	Dem	Christopher Belt	Dem Hold
59	Paul Jacobs	Rep	Paul Jacobs	Rep Hold

=== Detailed results by district ===
List of general election candidates are sourced from the Illinois State Board of Elections.

District	Democrats			Republicans			Third parties and independents			Total		
District	Candidate	Votes	%	Candidate	Votes	%	Candidate	Votes	%	Votes	Plr.	Mrg.
2nd	Omar Aquino (incumbent)	TBD		—	TBD		—	TBD		TBD		
3rd	Mattie Hunter (incumbent)	TBD		—	TBD		—	TBD		TBD		
5th	Lakesia Collins (incumbent)	TBD		—	TBD		—	TBD		TBD		
6th	Sara Feigenholtz (incumbent)	TBD		—	TBD		—	TBD		TBD		
8th	Ram Villivalam (incumbent)	TBD		Vince Romano	TBD		—	TBD		TBD		
9th	Patrick Hanley	TBD		Tom Lally	TBD		—	TBD		TBD		
11th	Mike Porfirio (incumbent)	TBD		—	TBD		—	TBD		TBD		
12th	Celina Villanueva (incumbent)	TBD		—	TBD		—	TBD		TBD		
14th	Emil Jones III (incumbent)	TBD		Brian Skala	TBD		—	TBD		TBD		
15th	Napoleon Harris (incumbent)	TBD		—	TBD		—	TBD		TBD		
17th	Elgie Sims (incumbent)	TBD		Frederick L. Walls	TBD		—	TBD		TBD		
18th	Frances Ann Hurley	TBD		Christine McGovern	TBD		—	TBD		TBD		
20th	Graciela Guzmán (incumbent)	TBD		—	TBD		—	TBD		TBD		
21st	Laura Ellman (incumbent)	TBD		Julie Berkowicz	TBD		—	TBD		TBD		
23rd	Suzy Glowiak Hilton (incumbent)	TBD		Linda Z. Polacek	TBD		—	TBD		TBD		
24th	Benjamin "Ben" McAdams	TBD		Seth Lewis (incumbent)	TBD		—	TBD		TBD		
26th	Nabeela Syed	TBD		Darby Hills (incumbent)	TBD		—	TBD		TBD		
27th	Carina Santa Maria	TBD		David Mathis	TBD		—	TBD		TBD		
29th	Julie A. Morrison (incumbent)	TBD		Kate McGrath	TBD		—	TBD		TBD		
30th	Adriane Johnson (incumbent)	TBD		—	TBD		—	TBD		TBD		
32nd	Karen Battaglia	TBD		Craig Wilcox (incumbent)	TBD		—	TBD		TBD		
33rd	Michele Clark	TBD		Danielle Penman	TBD		—	TBD		TBD		
35th	Sarah B. Mertens	TBD		Dave Syverson (incumbent)	TBD		—	TBD		TBD		
36th	Michael Halpin (incumbent)	TBD		Brad Beekman	TBD		—	TBD		TBD		
38th	Ernie R. Marcelain	TBD		Sue Rezin	TBD		—	TBD		TBD		
39th	Don Harmon (incumbent)	TBD		—	TBD		—	TBD		TBD		
41st	—	TBD		John Curran (incumbent)	TBD		—	TBD		TBD		
42nd	Linda Holmes (incumbent)	TBD		Edgardo "Eddie" Perez	TBD		—	TBD		TBD		
44th	—	TBD		Sally Turner (incumbent)	TBD		—	TBD		TBD		
45th	Joseph H. "Joe" Berning	TBD		Andrew Chesney (incumbent)	TBD		—	TBD		TBD		
47th	—	TBD		Neil Anderson (incumbent)	TBD		—	TBD		TBD		
48th	Doris Turner (incumbent)	TBD		Frank Lesko	TBD		—	TBD		TBD		
50th	—	TBD		Jil Tracy (incumbent)	TBD		—	TBD		TBD		
51st	—	TBD		Chapin Rose (incumbent)	TBD		—	TBD		TBD		
53rd	—	TBD		Chris Balkema (incumbent)	TBD		—	TBD		TBD		
54th	—	TBD		Steve McClure (incumbent)	TBD		—	TBD		TBD		
56th	Marsia Geldert-Murphey	TBD		Erica Harriss (incumbent)	TBD		—	TBD		TBD		
57th	Christopher Belt (incumbent)	TBD		Daniel Rhyne	TBD		—	TBD		TBD		
59th	Tamiko "T.C." Mueller	TBD		Paul Jacobs	TBD		—	TBD		TBD		

== Primary election results ==
Primary election results were sourced from the Illinois State Board of Elections.

=== Democratic primaries ===
==== Contested primaries ====
District	Nominees			Runners-up						Total		
District	Candidate	Votes	%	Candidate	Votes	%	Candidate	Votes	%	Votes	Maj.	Mrg.
6th	Sara Feigenholtz (incumbent)	23,197	55.11%	Nick Uniejewski	18,898	44.89%	—	—	—	42,095	+4,299	+10.21%
9th	Patrick Hanley	22,498	51.69%	Rachel Ruttenberg	21,029	48.31%	—	—	—	43,527	+1,469	+3.37%
14th	Emil Jones III (incumbent)	16,667	60.62%	Ahmed Karrar	6,248	22.73%	Kenny Williams	4,578	16.65%	27,493	+10,419	+37.90%
56th	Marsia Geldert-Murphey	8,002	53.47%	Kevin Hall	6,964	46.53%	—	—	—	14,966	+1,038	+6.94%

==== Nominated without opposition ====
The following candidates did not see any competition in the Democratic primary election:

- District 2: incumbent Omar Aquino received 20,103 votes.
- District 3: incumbent Mattie Hunter received 21,505 votes.
- District 5: incumbent Lakesia Collins received 22,253 votes.
- District 8: incumbent Ram Villivalam received 24,904 votes.
- District 11: incumbent Mike Porfirio received 17,370 votes.
- District 12: incumbent Celina Villanueva received 12,509 votes.
- District 15: incumbent Napoleon Harris received 26,414 votes.
- District 17: incumbent Elgie Sims received 28,992 votes.
- District 18: Frances Ann Hurley received 27,235 votes.
- District 20: incumbent Graciela Guzmán received 27,381 votes.
- District 21: incumbent Laura Ellman received 27,476 votes.
- District 23: incumbent Suzy Glowiak Hilton received 20,349 votes.
- District 24: Benjamin "Ben" McAdams received 21,988 votes.
- District 26: Nabeela Syed received 22,732 votes.
- District 27: Carina Santa Maria received 21,284 votes.
- District 29: incumbent Julie A. Morrison received 26,135 votes.
- District 30: incumbent Adriane Johnson received 14,777 votes.
- District 32: Karen Battaglia received 15,602 votes.
- District 33: Michele Clark received 20,399 votes.
- District 35: Sarah B. Mertens received 15,457 votes.
- District 36: incumbent Michael W. Halpin received 14,532 votes.
- District 38: Ernie R. Marcelain received 13,574 votes.
- District 39: incumbent Don Harmon received 27,053 votes.
- District 42: incumbent Linda Holmes received 20,756 votes.
- District 45: Joseph H. "Joe" Berning received 11,170 votes.
- District 48: incumbent Doris Turner received 15,137 votes.
- District 57: incumbent Christopher Belt received 15,375 votes.
- District 59: Tamiko "T.C." Mueller received 8,988 votes.

=== Republican primaries ===
==== Contested primaries ====
District	Nominees			Runners-up			Total		
District	Candidate	Votes	%	Candidate	Votes	%	Votes	Maj.	Mrg.
33rd	Danielle Penman	7,160	59.12%	Jessica Breugelmans	4,950	40.88%	12,110	+2,210	+18.25%
36th	Brad Beekman	5,421	53.25%	Patrick Harlan	4,759	46.75%	10,180	+662	+6.50%
45th	Andrew Chesney (incumbent)	17,869	98.98%	Joshua T. Atkinson (write-in)	185	1.02%	18,054	+17,684	+97.95%
48th	Frank Lesko	13259	99.52%	Shane Bouvet (write-in)	64	0.48%	13,323	+13,195	+99.04%
59th	Paul Jacobs	18008	72.95%	Stephen Vercellino	6,679	27.05%	24,687	+11,329	+45.89%

==== Nominated without opposition ====
The following candidates did not see any competition in the Republican primary election:

- District 6: Frank Rowder received 3 write-in votes.
- District 8: Vince Romano received 3,233 votes.
- District 9: Tom Lally received 3,766 votes.
- District 14: Brian Skala received 4,022 votes.
- District 15: Kenneth (Ken) Henderson received write-in 145 votes.
- District 17: Frederick L. Walls received 2,468 votes.
- District 18: Christine Mcgovern received 6,604 votes.
- District 21: Julie Berkowicz received 10,628 votes.
- District 23: Linda Z. Polacek received 8,589 votes.
- District 24: incumbent Seth Lewis received 12,797 votes.
- District 26: incumbent Darby Hills received 10,055 votes.
- District 27: David Mathis received 6,726 votes.
- District 29: Kate Mcgrath received 5,468 votes.
- District 32: incumbent Craig Wilcox received 9,831 votes.
- District 35: incumbent Dave Syverson received 12,338 votes.
- District 38: incumbent Sue Rezin received 12,113 votes.
- District 41: incumbent John Curran received 11,449 votes.
- District 42: Edgardo "Eddie" Perez received 7,027 votes.
- District 44: incumbent Sally Turner received 20,133 votes.
- District 47: incumbent Neil Anderson received 18,632 votes.
- District 50: incumbent Jil Tracy received 22,842 votes.
- District 51: incumbent Chapin Rose received 24,679 votes.
- District 53: incumbent Chris Balkema received 17,694 votes.
- District 54: incumbent Steve Mcclure received 24935 votes.
- District 56: incumbent Erica Harriss received 9,237 votes.
- District 57: Daniel Rhyne received 6,926 votes.

== District 2 ==
The 2nd district encompasses the Chicago neighborhoods of Ukrainian Village, Humboldt Park, and Belmont Cragin. The incumbent is Democrat Omar Aquino, who was re-elected in 2022 with 100% of the vote. He is running unopposed in the primary and general election.

=== Primary results ===
Democratic primary results
Party	Candidate	Votes	%
Democratic	Omar Aquino (incumbent)	20,103	100.0
Total votes		20,103	100.0

=== General election results ===
2026 Illinois Senate election, 2nd District
Party	Candidate	Votes	%
Democratic	Omar Aquino (Incumbent)		

== District 3 ==
The 3rd district encompasses the Chicago neighborhoods of Woodlawn, West Englewood, and Printer's Row. The incumbent is Democrat Mattie Hunter, who was re-elected in 2022 with 100% of the vote. She is running unopposed in the primary and general elections.

=== Primary results ===
Democratic primary results
Party	Candidate	Votes	%
Democratic	Mattie Hunter (incumbent)	21,505	100.0
Total votes		21,505	100.0

=== General election results ===
2026 Illinois Senate election, 3rd District
Party	Candidate	Votes	%
Democratic	Mattie Hunter (Incumbent)		

== District 5 ==
The 5th district encompasses the Chicago neighborhoods of West Garfield Park, Little Italy, and Pulaski Park. The incumbent is Democrat Lakesia Collins, who was re-elected in 2024 with 100% of the vote. She is running unopposed in the primary and general elections.

=== Primary results ===
Democratic primary results
Party	Candidate	Votes	%
Democratic	Lakesia Collins (incumbent)	22,253	100.0
Total votes		22,253	100.0

=== General election results ===
2026 Illinois Senate election, 3rd District
Party	Candidate	Votes	%
Democratic	Lakesia Collins (Incumbent)		

== District 6 ==
The 6th district includes the lakefront neighborhoods of Lake View, Lincoln Park, Buena Park and the Near North Side in the city of Chicago. The incumbent is Democrat Sara Feigenholtz, who was re-elected in 2022 unopposed. She defeated policy analyst and community organizer Nick Uniejewski in the primary and will face Republican Frank Rowder in the general election.

=== Primary results ===
Democratic primary results
Party	Candidate	Votes	%
Democratic	Sara Feigenholtz (incumbent)	23,197	55.11
Democratic	Nick Uniejewski	18,898	44.89
Total votes		42,095	100.0

Republican primary results
Party	Candidate	Votes	%
Republican	Frank Rowder	3	100.0
Total votes		3	100.0

=== General election results ===
2026 Illinois Senate election, 6th District
Party	Candidate	Votes	%
Democratic	Sara Feigenholtz (Incumbent)		
Republican	Frank Rowder		

== District 8 ==
The 8th district includes the suburban towns of Niles and Lincolnwood. The incumbent is Democrat Ram Villivalam, who was re-elected in 2022 with 100% of the vote. He was unopposed in the primary and will face Republican Vince Romano in the general election.

=== Primary results ===
Democratic primary results
Party	Candidate	Votes	%
Democratic	Ram Villivalam (incumbent)	24,904	100.0
Total votes		24,904	100.0

Republican primary results
Party	Candidate	Votes	%
Republican	Vince Romano	3,233	100.0
Total votes		3,233	100.0

=== General election results ===
2026 Illinois Senate election, 8th District
Party	Candidate	Votes	%
Democratic	Ram Villivalam (Incumbent)		
Republican	Vince Romano		

== District 9 ==
The 9th district includes the suburban towns of Glenview, Evanston, and Winnetka. The incumbent is Democrat Laura Fine, who was re-elected in 2022 with 71.8% of the vote. In May 2025, Fine announced that she would run for the U.S. House of Representatives in Illinois's 9th congressional district.

=== Democratic primary ===
==== Candidates ====
===== Declared =====
- Patrick Hanley, president of the New Trier Democrats
- Rachel Ruttenberg, deputy committeeperson of the Evanston Democratic Party

===== Declined =====
- Laura Fine, incumbent state senator (running for IL-09)

==== Endorsements ====
Patrick Hanley

U.S. representatives

- Jan Schakowsky, U.S. representative from Illinois's 9th congressional district (1999–present)

Organizations

- Abundant Housing Illinois
- Better Streets Chicago Action Fund
- Run for Something
Rachel Ruttenberg

State legislators

- Robyn Gabel, majority leader of the Illinois House of Representatives (2023–present) from the 18th district (2010–present)
- Jennifer Gong-Gershowitz, state representative from the 17th district (2019–present)
- Tracy Katz Muhl, state representative from the 57th district (2024–present)

== District 11 ==
The 11th district includes all or parts of Bedford Park, Berwyn, Bridgeview, Brookfield, Burbank, Cicero, Countryside, Hodgkins, Justice, La Grange, La Grange Park, North Riverside, Riverside, Summit and the Chicago neighborhoods of Ashburn, Clearing, Garfield Ridge, West Elsdon, and West Lawn. The incumbent is Democrat Mike Porfirio, who was elected in 2022 with 66.2% of the vote. He is running unopposed in the primary and general election.

=== Primary results ===
Democratic primary results
Party	Candidate	Votes	%
Democratic	Mike Porfirio (incumbent)	17,370	100.0
Total votes		17,370	100.0

=== General election results ===
2026 Illinois Senate election, 2nd District
Party	Candidate	Votes	%
Democratic	Mike Porfirio (Incumbent)		

== District 12 ==
The 12th district includes the neighborhoods of South Lawndale, Brighton Park, and Chinatown. The incumbent is Democrat Celina Villanueva, who was elected in 2022 with 100% of the vote.

=== Democratic primary ===
==== Candidates ====
===== Potential =====
- Celina Villanueva, incumbent state senator

== District 14 ==
The 14th district stretches from the neighborhood of Princeton Park in Chicago to the suburban communities of Blue Island, Tinley Park, and Orland Park. The incumbent is Democrat Emil Jones III, who was re-elected in 2022 with 100% of the vote.

=== Democratic primary ===
==== Candidates ====
===== Potential =====
- Emil Jones III, incumbent state senator

== District 15 ==
The 15th district stretches from the town of Kankakee to the suburban communities of Dolton, Harvey, Oak Forest, and Flossmoor. The incumbent is Democrat Napoleon Harris, who was re-elected in 2022 with 100% of the vote.

=== Democratic primary ===
==== Candidates ====
===== Potential =====
- Napoleon Harris, incumbent state senator

== District 17 ==
The 17th district stretches from the town of Aroma Park, Illinois to the suburban communities of South Chicago, Hammond, and Lansing. The incumbent is Democrat Elgie Sims, who was re-elected in 2022 with 100% of the vote.

=== Democratic primary ===
==== Candidates ====
===== Potential =====
- Elgie Sims, incumbent state senator

== District 18 ==
The 18th district includes the suburban communities of Orland Park, Oak Lawn, and Evergreen Park. The incumbent is Democrat Bill Cunningham, who was re-elected in 2022 with 59.4% of the vote.

=== Democratic primary ===
==== Candidates ====
===== Potential =====
- Bill Cunningham, incumbent state senator

== District 20 ==
The 20th district includes the neighborhoods of Logan Square, Hermosa, and Albany Park in the city of Chicago. The incumbent is Democrat Graciela Guzmán, who was elected in 2024 with 81.2% of the vote.

=== Democratic primary ===
==== Candidates ====
===== Potential =====
- Graciela Guzmán, incumbent state senator

== District 21 ==
The 21st district includes the cities of Lombard, Glen Ellyn, and Naperville. The incumbent is Democrat Laura Ellman, who was re-elected in 2022 with 58.8% of the vote.

=== Democratic primary ===
==== Candidates ====
===== Potential =====
- Laura Ellman, incumbent state senator

== District 23 ==
The 23rd district includes the communities of Glendale Heights, Glen Ellyn, Villa Park, and Westmont. The incumbent is Democrat Suzy Glowiak, who was re-elected in 2022 with 54.6% of the vote.

=== Democratic primary ===
==== Candidates ====
===== Potential =====
- Suzy Glowiak, incumbent state senator

=== Republican primary ===
==== Candidates ====
===== Declared =====
- Linda Polacek, York Center Park District commissioner

== District 24 ==
The 24th district includes the communities of Warrenville, Wheaton, Carol Stream, and Wood Dale. The incumbent is Republican Seth Lewis, who was elected in 2022 with 51.9% of the vote.

=== Republican primary ===
==== Candidates ====
- Seth Lewis, incumbent state senator

=== Democratic primary ===
==== Candidates ====
- Benjamin McAdams, community organizer

== District 26 ==
The 26th district includes the communities of Wauconda, Palatine, and Algonquin. The incumbent is Republican Darby Hills, who was appointed to the seat in February 2025, following the resignation of then-state senator Dan McConchie. McConchie was re-elected with 50.2% of the vote in 2022.

=== Republican primary ===
==== Candidates ====
===== Declared =====
- Darby Hills, incumbent state senator

=== Democratic primary ===
==== Candidates ====
===== Declared =====
- Nabeela Syed, state representative from the 51st district (2023–present)

==== Endorsements ====
Nabeela Syed

Organizations

- Leaders We Deserve
- Run for Something

== District 27 ==
The 27th district encompasses the communities of Arlington Heights, Illinois and Mount Prospect. The incumbent is Democrat Mark L. Walker, who was elected in 2024 with 57.6% of the vote.

=== Democratic primary ===
==== Candidates ====
===== Declared =====
- Carina Santa Maria, Arlington Heights trustee

===== Declined =====
- Mark L. Walker, incumbent state senator

== District 29 ==
The 29th district includes the communities of Lake Forest, Highland Park, Northbrook, and Deerfield. The incumbent is Democrat Julie Morrison, who was re-elected in 2022 with 100% of the vote.

=== Democratic primary ===
==== Candidates ====
===== Declared =====
- Julie Morrison, incumbent state senator

== District 30 ==
The 30th district stretches from the city of Waukegan to the communities of Mundelein, Vernon Hills, and Wheeling. The incumbent is Democrat Adriane Johnson, who was re-elected in 2022 with 100% of the vote.

=== Democratic primary ===
==== Candidates ====
===== Potential =====
- Adriane Johnson, incumbent state senator

== District 32 ==
The 32nd district contains parts of Lake and McHenry counties, including the communities of Woodstock, McHenry, Spring Grove, and Antioch. The incumbent is Republican Craig Wilcox, who was re-elected in 2022 with 55.9% of the vote.

=== Republican primary ===
==== Candidates ====
===== Potential =====
- Craig Wilcox, incumbent state senator

== District 33 ==
The 33rd district includes the northeast corner of Kane County as well as the communities of Lake in the Hills and Crystal Lake in McHenry County. The incumbent is Republican Don DeWitte, who was re-elected in 2022 with 100% of the vote.

=== Republican primary ===
==== Candidates ====
===== Declined =====
- Don DeWitte, incumbent state senator

== District 35 ==
The 35th district includes portions of Boone, DeKalb, Kane, McHenry, and Winnebago counties. The incumbent is Republican Dave Syverson, who was re-elected in 2022 with 100% of the vote.

=== Republican primary ===
==== Candidates ====
===== Potential =====
- Dave Syverson, incumbent state senator

== District 36 ==
The 36th district contains portions of Rock Island County, Henry County, Mercer County, Knox County, McDonough County, and Warren County. The incumbent is Democrat Michael Halpin, who was elected in 2022 with 54.6% of the vote.

=== Democratic primary ===
==== Candidates ====
===== Declared =====
- Michael Halpin, incumbent state senator

== District 38 ==
The 38th district includes portions of DeKalb, Grundy, Kendall, and LaSalle counties. The incumbent is Republican Sue Rezin, who was re-elected in 2022 with 100% of the vote.

=== Republican primary ===
==== Candidates ====
===== Potential =====
- Sue Rezin, incumbent state senator

== District 39 ==
The 39th district includes the communities of Oak Park, Elmwood Park, Franklin Park, and Addison in the suburbs of Chicago, as well as the O'Hare International Airport. The incumbent is Democrat Don Harmon, the president of the Illinois Senate, who was re-elected in 2022 with 100% of the vote.

=== Democratic primary ===
==== Candidates ====
===== Potential =====
- Don Harmon, incumbent state senator

== District 41 ==
The 41st district includes the communities of Downers Grove, Woodridge, Darien, and Lemont. The incumbent is Republican John Curran, the minority leader of the Illinois Senate, who was re-elected in 2022 with 100% of the vote.

=== Republican primary ===
==== Candidates ====
===== Potential =====
- John Curran, incumbent state senator

== District 42 ==
The 42nd district includes all or parts of Aurora, Boulder Hill, Montgomery, Naperville, North Aurora and Oswego. The incumbent is Democrat Linda Holmes, who was re-elected in 2022 with 60.3% of the vote.

=== Democratic primary ===
==== Candidates ====
===== Potential =====
- Linda Holmes, incumbent state senator

=== Republican primary ===
==== Candidates ====
===== Potential =====
- Eddie Perez, U.S. Air Force veteran

== District 44 ==
The 44th district includes all or portions of DeWitt, Logan, Macon, McLean, Piatt, and Tazewell counties in central Illinois. The incumbent is Republican Sally Turner, who was re-elected in 2022 with 100% of the vote.

=== Republican primary ===
==== Candidates ====
===== Potential =====
- Sally Turner, incumbent state senator

== District 45 ==
The 45th district includes all or portions of Boone, Carroll, DeKalb, Jo Daviess, Ogle, Stephenson, and Winnebago counties in northwestern Illinois. The incumbent is Republican Andrew Chesney, who was elected in 2022 with 66.4% of the vote.

=== Republican primary ===
==== Candidates ====
===== Potential =====
- Andrew Chesney, incumbent state senator

== District 47 ==
The 47th district includes all of Fulton, Hancock, Henderson, and Mason counties, as well as parts of Adams, Henry, Knox, McDonough, Mercer, Peoria, Schuyler, Stark, Tazewell, and Warren counties. The incumbent is Republican Neil Anderson, who was re-elected in 2022 with 100% of the vote.

=== Republican primary ===
==== Candidates ====
===== Declared =====
- Neil Anderson, incumbent state senator

== District 48 ==
The 48th district stretches between the cities of Springfield and Decatur, including the communities of Rochester, Edinburg, and Mount Auburn. The incumbent is Democrat Doris Turner, who was elected in 2022 with 50.9% of the vote.

=== Democratic primary ===
==== Candidates ====
===== Declared =====
- Doris Turner, incumbent state senator

=== Republican primary ===
==== Candidates ====
===== Declared =====
- Frank Lesko, Sangamon County Recorder (2024–present)

== District 50 ==
The 50th district covers a large swath of west-central Illinois, including all of Adams, Brown, Cass, Hancock, Henderson, Mason, McDonough, Schuyler, Warren counties and portions of Fulton and Knox counties. The incumbent is Republican Jil Tracy, who was re-elected in 2022 with 100% of the vote.

=== Republican primary ===
==== Candidates ====
===== Declared =====
- Jil Tracy, incumbent state senator

== District 51 ==
The 51st district includes all or portions of Champaign, Clark, Coles, Cumberland, Douglas, Edgar, Jasper, Lawrence, and Vermilion counties. The incumbent is Republican Chapin Rose, who was re-elected in 2022 with 100% of the vote.

=== Republican primary ===
==== Candidates ====
===== Potential =====
- Chapin Rose, incumbent state senator

== District 53 ==
The 53rd district includes all or portions of Bureau, Ford, Grundy, Iroquois, LaSalle, Marshall, McLean, Peoria, Putnam, Tazewell, Will, and Woodford counties in central Illinois. The incumbent is Republican Chris Balkema, who was elected in 2024 with 100% of the vote.

=== Republican primary ===
==== Candidates ====
===== Declared =====
- Chris Balkema, incumbent state senator

== District 54 ==
The 54th district includes all or portions of Christian, Effingham, Macoupin, Macon, Menard, Montgomery, Moultrie, Sangamon, and Shelby counties. The incumbent is Republican Steve McClure, who was re-elected in 2022 with 100% of the vote.

=== Republican primary ===
==== Candidates ====
===== Potential =====
- Steve McClure, incumbent state senator

== District 56 ==
The 56th district includes the cities of East Alton, Edwardsville, Granite City, and Collinsville. The incumbent is Republican Erica Harriss, who was elected in 2022 with 51.4% of the vote. She was unopposed in the primary election and will face Democrat Marsia Geldert-Murphey in the general election.

=== Primary results ===
Republican primary results
Party	Candidate	Votes	%
Republican	Erica Harriss (incumbent)	9,237	100.0
Total votes		9,237	100.0

Democratic primary results
Party	Candidate	Votes	%
Democratic	Marsia Geldert-Murphey	8,002	53.47
Democratic	Kevin Hall	6,964	46.53
Total votes		14,966	100.0

=== General election results ===
2026 Illinois Senate election, 56th District
Party	Candidate	Votes	%
Republican	Erica Harriss (incumbent)		
Democratic	Marsia Geldert-Murphey		

== District 57 ==
The 57th district encompasses most of St. Clair County, including the communities of Belleville, Mascoutah, and Cahokia Heights. The incumbent is Democrat Christopher Belt, who was re-elected in 2022 with 57.7% of the vote. He was unopposed in the primary and faces Republican Daniel Rhyne in the general election.

=== Primary results ===
Democratic primary results
Party	Candidate	Votes	%
Democratic	Christopher Belt (incumbent)	15,375	100.0
Total votes		15,375	100.0

Republican primary results
Party	Candidate	Votes	%
Republican	Daniel Rhyne	6,926	100.0
Total votes		6,926	100.0

=== General election results ===
2026 Illinois Senate election, 2nd District
Party	Candidate	Votes	%
Democratic	Christopher Belt (incumbent)		
Republican	Daniel Rhyne		

== District 59 ==
The 59th district encompasses the southern tip of Illinois, including all or portions of Alexander, Franklin, Gallatin, Hamilton, Hardin, Jackson, Johnson, Massac, Pope, Pulaski, Saline, Union, White, and Williamson counties. The incumbent is Republican Dale Fowler, who was re-elected in 2022 with 100% of the vote. He is retiring; state representative Paul Jacobs defeated Franklin County Treasurer Stephen Vercellino in the Republican primary and will face Democrat Tamiko Mueller in the general election.

=== Primary results ===
Republican primary results
Party	Candidate	Votes	%
Republican	Paul Jacobs	18,008	72.95
Republican	Stephen Vercellino	6,679	27.05
Total votes		15,667	100.0

Democratic primary results
Party	Candidate	Votes	%
Democratic	Tamiko "T.C." Mueller	8,988	100.0
Total votes		8,988	100.0

=== General election results ===
2026 Illinois Senate election, 2nd District
Party	Candidate	Votes	%
Republican	Paul Jacobs		
Democratic	Tamiko "T.C." Mueller		
