= 101st Illinois General Assembly =

Illinois state legislative session from 2019 to 2021

←	100th	102nd	→
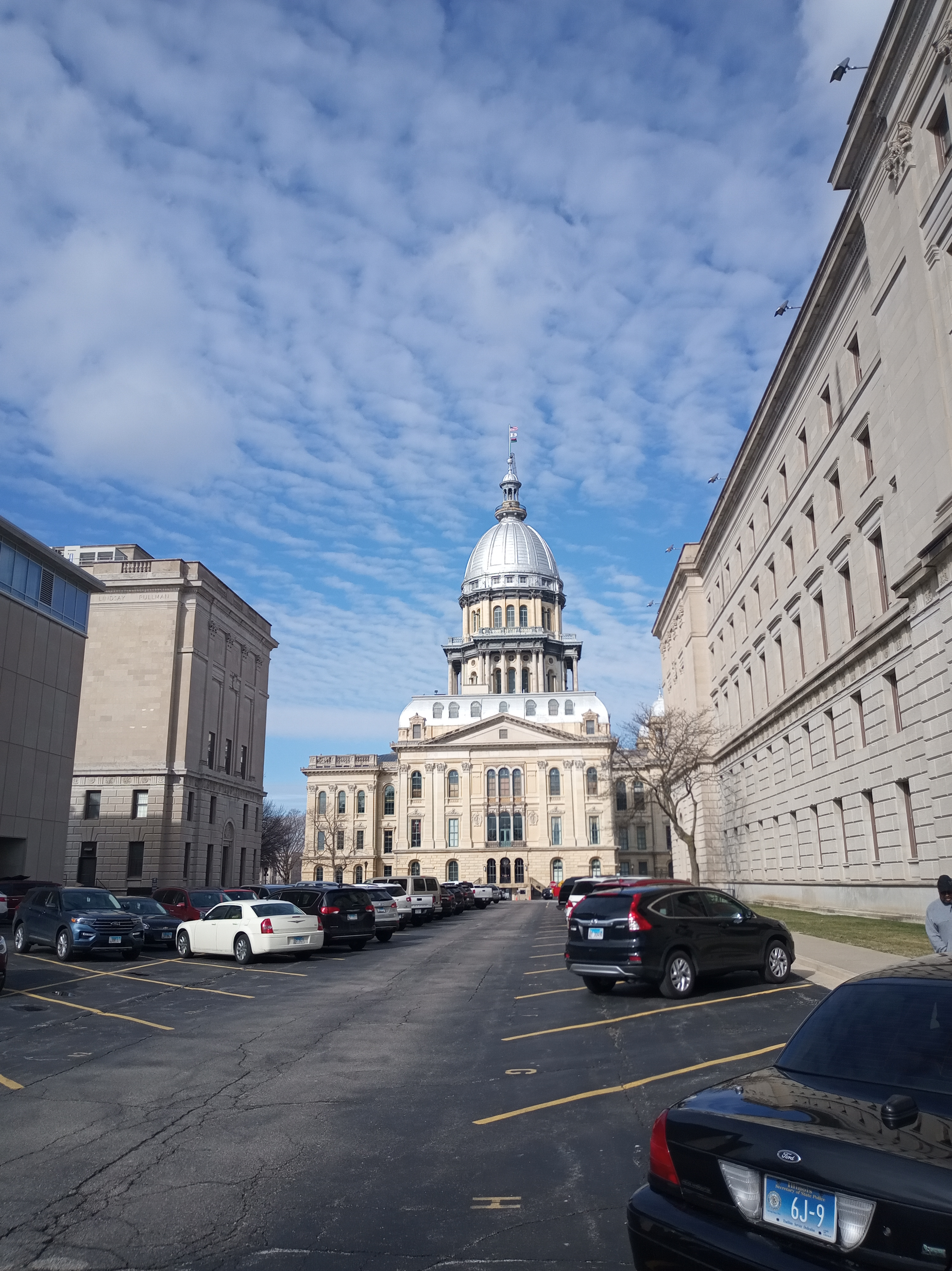
- The Illinois State Capitol in 2020

Overview
- Meeting place: Springfield, Illinois
- Term: 2019 – 2021
- Election: 2018
- Website: Official site

Illinois Senate
- President: Don Harmon, Democrat

Illinois House of Representatives
- Speaker: Michael J. Madigan, Democrat

The 101st Illinois General Assembly convened on January 9, 2019, and adjourned sine die on January 13, 2021. Over that period, it was in session for a total of 99 days.

The membership of the 101st General Assembly was decided by the 2018 elections. That election returned Illinois to a Democratic government trifecta after four years of divided government. The Democratic Party also increased its majority in the Illinois House and Senate.

== Legislation ==
The 101st General Assembly enacted a total of 673 bills into law. Notable among these was the Illinois Cannabis Regulation and Tax Act (410 ILCS 705), which legalizes and regulates the production, consumption, and sale of cannabis in Illinois. It was approved by both houses by May 31, 2019, and came into effect January 1, 2020.

In 2019, the legislature passed a US$40 billion budget for the state government. The budget was signed into law by the governor on June 5, marking the first budget passed without a veto since the Illinois Budget Impasse of 2015–2017. The budget was introduced hours before the scheduled end of the spring session. It passed with bipartisan support in the House. In the Senate, it passed on a party-line vote in which all Republicans voted against it because it contained a pay raise for legislators.

On May 31, 2019, Illinois became the eleventh state to pass legislation protecting abortion rights in the state in response to anti-abortion legislation being passed elsewhere. Known as the Illinois Reproductive Health Act, the legislation provides statutory protections for abortions, and rescinds previous legislation that banned some late-term abortions and a 45-year-old law that had made performing such abortions a criminal offense. Under the Reproductive Health Act, women have the "fundamental right" to access abortion services, and a "fertilized egg, embryo, or fetus does not have independent rights". The governor signed the bill into law on June 12, 2019.

In 2020, the legislative calendar was greatly disrupted by the COVID-19 pandemic in Illinois. In mid-March, both houses canceled their then-ongoing sessions. The legislature did not return to Springfield until May 19. In the May session, social distancing was adopted, which required the House to meet at the Bank of Springfield Center rather than the Capitol. The fall veto session was canceled. Due to these disruptions, only three new laws took effect in Illinois on January 1, 2021. These were: an amendment to the Illinois Insurance Code capping out-of-pocket costs for insulin to US$100 per month; an amendment to the Missing Persons Identification Act allowing law enforcement to obtain DNA samples; and a measure expanding the Illinois Address Confidentiality Program to cover victims of sexual assault and stalking.

== Senate ==
Results of the 2018 Illinois Senate election.

Of the 39 Senate seats up for election in the 2018 election, three changed hands from the Republican to the Democratic Party.

=== Senate leadership ===
At the beginning of the session, the Senate elected John J. Cullerton as president, a position that he had held since 2009. The Senate Democrats elected Kimberly Lightford as majority leader, succeeding James Clayborne. Bill Brady was elected as minority leader.

Cullerton announced in November 2019 that he would resign from the Senate. On January 19, 2020, the Senate unanimously elected Don Harmon as the new president.

Position	Name	Party	District
President of the Senate	Don Harmon	Democratic	39
Majority Leader	Kimberly Lightford	Democratic	4
Minority Leader	William E. Brady	Republican	44

=== Party composition ===
The Senate of the 101st General Assembly consisted of 19 Republicans and 40 Democrats.

Affiliation	Members
Democratic Party	40
Republican Party	19
Total	59

=== State senators ===
District	Counties represented	Senator	Party	First year	Committees
1	Cook	Antonio Muñoz	Democratic	1999	Chair: Executive Appointments; Member: Assignments; Energy and Public Utilities; Executive; Insurance; Veterans Affairs
2	Cook	Omar Aquino	Democratic	2016	Chair: Labor; Member: Appropriations I; Appropriations II; Education; Government Accountability/Pensions; Higher Education; Licensed Activities; Special Committee on Opioid Crisis Abatement
3	Cook	Mattie Hunter	Democratic	2003	Chair: Executive; Member: Appropriations I; Energy and Public Utilities; Human Services; Special Committee on Opioid Crisis Abatement; Public Health; Transportation
4	Cook	Kimberly A. Lightford	Democratic	1998	Chair: Assignments; Member: Education; Energy and Public Utilities; Executive; Executive Appointments; Special Committee on Oversight of Medicaid Managed Care; Special Committee on Supplier Diversity
5	Cook	Patricia Van Pelt	Democratic	2013	Chair: Public Health; Member: Agriculture; Criminal Law; Energy and Public Utilities; Higher Education; Special Committee on Oversight of Medicaid Managed Care; State Government
6	Cook	John J. Cullerton	Democratic	1979	
6	Cook	Sara Feigenholtz	Democratic	2020	Member: Appropriations I; Human Services; Environment and Conservation; Licensed Activities
7	Cook	Heather A. Steans	Democratic	2008	Chair: Appropriations I; Special Committee on Oversight of Medicaid Managed Care; Member: Appropriations II; Environment and Conservation; Executive; Executive Appointments; Government Accountability/Pensions; Human Services
8	Cook	Ram Villivalam	Democratic	2019	Chair: Special Committee on Supplier Diversity; Transportation; Member: Appropriations I; Appropriations II; Education; Human Services; Labor; Special Committee on Pension Investments
9	Cook	Laura Fine	Democratic	2019	Member: Appropriations II; Environment and Conservation; Human Services; Insurance; Local Government; Public Health
10	Cook	John G. Mulroe	Democratic	2010	
10	Cook	Robert F. Martwick	Democratic	2019	Member: Criminal Law; Government Accountability/Pensions; Judiciary; Licensed Activities; Public Health; Revenue
11	Cook	Martin A. Sandoval	Democratic	2003	
11	Cook	Celina Villanueva	Democratic	2020	Member: Appropriations I; Higher Education; Transportation
12	Cook	Steven M. Landek	Democratic	2011	Chair: State Government; Member: Appropriations II; Government Accountability/Pensions; Insurance; Local Government
13	Cook	Robert Peters	Democratic	2019	Member: Criminal Law; Financial Institutions; Human Services; Telecommunications & InfoTechnology; Veterans Affairs
14	Cook	Emil Jones III	Democratic	2009	Chair: Licensed Activities; Member: Energy and Public Utilities; Financial Institutions; Higher Education; Insurance; Special Committee on Oversight of Medicaid Managed Care; Transportation; Veterans Affairs
15	Cook, Will	Napoleon Harris III	Democratic	2013	Chair: Insurance; Member: Commerce and Economic Development; Executive; Human Services; Special Committee on Pension Investments; Special Committee on Supplier Diversity; Telecommunications & InfoTechnology
16	Cook	Jacqueline Y. Collins	Democratic	2003	Chair: Financial Institutions; Member: Insurance; Transportation
17	Cook, Kankakee, Will	Elgie R. Sims Jr.	Democratic	2012	Chair: Criminal Law; Member: Appropriations I; Appropriations II; Judiciary; Special Committee on Opioid Crisis Abatement; Telecommunications & InfoTechnology
18	Cook	Bill Cunningham	Democratic	2011	Member: Assignments; Energy and Public Utilities; Executive; Executive Appointments; Higher Education; Insurance
19	Cook, Will	Michael E. Hastings	Democratic	2013	Chair: Energy and Public Utilities; Member: Commerce and Economic Development; Executive; Executive Appointments; Insurance; Judiciary
20	Cook	Iris Y. Martinez	Democratic	2003	Chair: Special Committee on Pension Investments; Member: Commerce and Economic Development; Education; Energy and Public Utilities; Executive; Government Accountability/Pensions; Revenue; Transportation
21	DuPage, Will	Laura Ellman	Democratic	2019	Member: Agriculture; Appropriations I; Energy and Public Utilities; Government Accountability/Pensions; Higher Education; Veterans Affairs
22	Cook, Kane	Cristina Castro	Democratic	2017	Chair: Government Accountability/Pensions; Revenue; Member: Appropriations I; Commerce and Economic Development; Energy and Public Utilities; Labor; Special Committee on Opioid Crisis Abatement; Transportation; Veterans Affairs
23	Cook, DuPage, DuPage	Thomas Cullerton	Democratic	2013	Chair: Veterans Affairs; Member: Energy and Public Utilities; Insurance; Labor; State Government; Transportation
24	Cook, DuPage	Suzy Glowiak Hilton	Democratic	2019	Member: Appropriations II; Education; Energy and Public Utilities; Insurance; Labor; Local Government
25	Cook, DuPage, Kane, Kendall	Jim Oberweis	Republican	2013	Member: Commerce and Economic Development; Environment and Conservation; Executive; Labor; Revenue; Transportation
26	Cook, Kane, Lake, McHenry	Dan McConchie	Republican	2016	Member: Appropriations II; Higher Education; Insurance; Labor; Public Health; State Government; Special Committee on Supplier Diversity; Telecommunications & InfoTechnology
27	Cook	Ann Gillespie	Democratic	2019	Member: Appropriations I; Commerce and Economic Development; Education; Government Accountability/Pensions; Insurance; Judiciary; Special Committee on Oversight of Medicaid Managed Care
28	Cook, DuPage	Laura M. Murphy	Democratic	2015	Chair: Local Government; Member: Assignments; Commerce and Economic Development; Executive; Executive Appointments; Financial Institutions; Higher Education; Insurance; Public Health
29	Cook, Lake	Julie A. Morrison	Democratic	2013	Chair: Human Services; Member: Environment and Conservation; Local Government; Special Committee on Oversight of Medicaid Managed Care; Public Health; Transportation
30	Cook, Lake	Terry Link	Democratic	1997	Member: Energy and Public Utilities; Executive; Executive Appointments; Financial Institutions; Insurance
31	Lake	Melinda Bush	Democratic	2013	Chair: Environment and Conservation; Member: Appropriations II; Education; Government Accountability/Pensions; Special Committee on Opioid Crisis Abatement; Revenue; Transportation
32	Lake, McHenry	Craig Wilcox	Republican	2018	Member: Agriculture; Appropriations I; Energy and Public Utilities; Human Services; Labor; Transportation; Veterans Affairs
33	Kane, McHenry	Donald P. DeWitte	Republican	2018	Chair: Special Committee on Pension Investments; Member: Appropriations II; Education; Government Accountability/Pensions; Local Government; Special Committee on Opioid Crisis Abatement; Revenue; Telecommunications & InfoTechnology; Transportation
34	Winnebago	Steve Stadelman	Democratic	2013	Chair: Telecommunications & InfoTechnology; Member: Financial Institutions; Higher Education; Public Health; Revenue; Transportation
35	Boone, DeKalb, Kane, Winnebago	Dave Syverson	Republican	1993	Member: Environment and Conservation; Executive; Human Services; Insurance; Special Committee on Oversight of Medicaid Managed Care; Public Health
36	Carroll, Henry, Rock Island, Whiteside	Neil Anderson	Republican	2015	Member: Commerce and Economic Development; Energy and Public Utilities; Licensed Activities; Special Committee on Opioid Crisis Abatement; Special Committee on Oversight of Medicaid Managed Care; Transportation; Veterans Affairs
37	Bureau, Henry, Knox, LaSalle, Lee, Marshall, Mercer, Peoria, Stark, Woodford	Chuck Weaver	Republican	2015	Member: Education; Higher Education; Insurance; Labor; Licensed Activities; Transportation
38	Bureau, Grundy, Kendall, LaSalle, Livingston, Putnam, Will	Sue Rezin	Republican	2010	Member: Education; Energy and Public Utilities; Executive; Government Accountability/Pensions; Revenue
39	Cook, DuPage	Don Harmon	Democratic	2003	Member: Executive; Judiciary
40	Cook, Grundy, Kankakee, Will	Toi W. Hutchinson	Democratic	2009	
40	Cook, Grundy, Kankakee, Will	Patrick J. Joyce	Democratic	2019	Member: Agriculture; Energy and Public Utilities; Labor; Local Government; Special Committee on Opioid Crisis Abatement; Public Health
41	Cook, DuPage, Will	John F. Curran	Republican	2017	Member: Appropriations II; Assignments; Education; Energy and Public Utilities; Government Accountability/Pensions; Local Government; Special Committee on Opioid Crisis Abatement; Transportation
42	DuPage, Kane, Kendall, Will	Linda Holmes	Democratic	2007	Chair: Commerce and Economic Development; Member: Agriculture; Executive; Labor; Local Government; Telecommunications & InfoTechnology
43	DuPage, Will	Pat McGuire	Democratic	2012	Chair: Higher Education; Member: Appropriations II; Environment and Conservation; Revenue; State Government; Transportation
44	Logan, McLean, Menard, Sangamon, Tazewell	William E. Brady	Republican	1993	Member: Executive
45	Carroll, DeKalb, Jo Daviess, LaSalle, Lee, Ogle, Stephenson, Whiteside, Winnebago	Brian W. Stewart	Republican	2013	Member: Appropriations I; Criminal Law; Executive Appointments; Human Services; Insurance; Special Committee on Oversight of Medicaid Managed Care; Special Committee on Pension Investments; Veterans Affairs
46	Fulton, Peoria, Tazewell	David Koehler	Democratic	2006	Member: Agriculture; Education; Environment and Conservation; Labor; Local Government; Special Committee on Oversight of Medicaid Managed Care; Special Committee on Supplier Diversity; Transportation
47	Adams, Brown, Cass, Fulton, Hancock, Henderson, Knox, Mason, McDonough, Schuyler, Warren	Jil Tracy	Republican	2017	Member: Agriculture; Executive Appointments; Judiciary; Labor; Special Committee on Opioid Crisis Abatement; Special Committee on Pension Investments; State Government; Special Committee on Supplier Diversity; Telecommunications & InfoTechnology
48	Christian, Macon, Macoupin, Madison, Montgomery, Sangamon	Andy Manar	Democratic	2013	Chair: Appropriations II; Member: Agriculture; Appropriations I; Education; Executive Appointments; Labor; Special Committee on Opioid Crisis Abatement
49	Kendall, Will	Jennifer Bertino-Tarrant	Democratic	2013	Chair: Education; Member: Commerce and Economic Development; Insurance; Labor; Licensed Activities; Transportation
50	Calhoun, Greene, Jersey, Macoupin, Madison, Morgan, Pike, Sangamon, Scott	Steve McClure	Republican	2019	Member: Agriculture; Criminal Law; Energy and Public Utilities; Higher Education; Local Government; Special Committee on Pension Investments; Public Health; State Government; Special Committee on Supplier Diversity
51	Champaign, DeWitt, Douglas, Edgar, Macon, McLean, Moultrie, Piatt, Shelby, Vermilion	Chapin Rose	Republican	2003	Member: Appropriations I; Appropriations II; Financial Institutions; Higher Education; Insurance
52	Champaign, Vermilion	Scott M. Bennett	Democratic	2015	Chair: Agriculture; Member: Appropriations II; Criminal Law; Higher Education; Labor; State Government
53	Ford, Iroquois, Livingston, McLean, Vermilion, Woodford	Jason A. Barickman	Republican	2011	Member: Criminal Law; Education; Energy and Public Utilities; Executive; Judiciary; Labor
54	Bond, Clinton, Effingham, Fayette, Madison, Marion, St. Clair, Washington	Jason Plummer	Republican	2019	Member: Appropriations I; Appropriations II; Environment and Conservation; Executive Appointments; Financial Institutions; Public Health
55	Clark, Clay, Coles, Crawford, Cumberland, Edgar, Edwards, Effingham, Jasper, Lawrence, Richland, Wabash, Wayne, White	Dale A. Righter	Republican	1998	Member: Appropriations I; Appropriations II; Assignments; Executive; Executive Appointments; Human Services; Insurance; Special Committee on Oversight of Medicaid Managed Care
56	Jersey, Madison, St. Clair	Rachelle Crowe	Democratic	2019	Chair: Judiciary; Special Committee on Opioid Crisis Abatement; Member: Appropriations II; Criminal Law; Labor; Licensed Activities; Veterans Affairs
57	Madison, St. Clair	Christopher Belt	Democratic	2019	Member: Criminal Law; Education; Energy and Public Utilities; Insurance; Labor; Licensed Activities; Special Committee on Opioid Crisis Abatement
58	Jackson, Jefferson, Monroe, Perry, Randolph, St. Clair, Union, Washington	Paul Schimpf	Republican	2017	Member: Agriculture; Energy and Public Utilities; Financial Institutions; Judiciary; Transportation; Veterans Affairs
59	Alexander, Franklin, Gallatin, Hamilton, Hardin, Jackson, Johnson, Massac, Pope, Pulaski, Saline, Union, Williamson	Dale Fowler	Republican	2017	Member: Commerce and Economic Development; Education; Energy and Public Utilities; Government Accountability/Pensions; Higher Education; Insurance; Licensed Activities; Special Committee on Opioid Crisis Abatement; Transportation

== House ==
=== Party composition ===
Map of 2020 Illinois House election results.

The House of the 101st General Assembly consisted of 44 Republicans and 74 Democrats. The party composition reflects the results of the 2020 election.

Affiliation	Members
Democratic Party	74
Republican Party	44
Total	118

=== House leadership ===
Position	Name	Party	District
Speaker of the House	Michael J. Madigan	Democratic	22
Majority Leader	Greg Harris	Democratic	13
Minority Leader	Jim Durkin	Republican	82

=== State representatives ===
District	Counties represented	Representative	Party	First year	Committees
1	Cook	Aaron M. Ortiz	Democratic	2019	Member: Appropriations-Higher Education; Appropriations-Public Safety; Cybersecurity, Data Analytics, & IT; Veterans' Affairs
2	Cook	Theresa Mah	Democratic	2017	Member: Appropriations-Elementary & Secondary Education; Energy & Environment; Health Care Licenses; International Trade & Commerce, Museums, Arts, & Cultural Enhancement
3	Cook	Luis Arroyo	Democratic	2006	Chair: Appropriations-Capital; Member: Transportation: Vehicles & Safety; Executive; Public Utilities
3	Cook	Eva Dina Delgado	Democratic	2019	Member: Appropriations-Human Services; Insurance; Mental Health; Transportation: Regulation, Roads
4	Cook	Delia C. Ramirez	Democratic	2018	Member: Adoption & Child Welfare; Appropriations-Human Services; Elementary & Secondary Education: Administration, Licensing & Charter; Judiciary - Criminal; Mental Health
5	Cook	Lamont J. Robinson Jr.	Democratic	2019	Member: Appropriations-Public Safety; Financial Institutions; Personnel & Pensions; Prescription Drug Affordability; Transportation: Regulation, Roads
6	Cook	Sonya M. Harper	Democratic	2015	Chair: Agriculture & Conservation; Economic Opportunity & Equity; Member: Appropriations-Public Safety; Elementary & Secondary Education: School Curriculum & Policies; Energy & Environment; Human Services
7	Cook	Emanuel Chris Welch	Democratic	2013	Chair: Executive; Member: Cities & Villages; Counties & Townships; Higher Education; Insurance; Revenue & Finance
8	Cook	La Shawn K. Ford	Democratic	2007	Chair: Appropriations-Higher Education; Member: Financial Institutions; Personnel & Pensions; Public Utilities
9	Cook	Arthur Turner	Democratic	2010	Member: Cybersecurity, Data Analytics, & IT; Executive; Judiciary - Criminal; Public Utilities; Revenue & Finance; Rules
9	Cook	Lakesia Collins	Democratic	2020	Member: Health Care Availability & Accessibility; Human Services; Economic Opportunity & Equity; Child Care Accessibility & Early Childhood
10	Cook	Melissa Conyears-Ervin	Democratic	2017	
10	Cook	Jawaharial Williams	Democratic	2019	Member: Appropriations-Capital; Financial Institutions; Public Utilities; Transportation: Vehicles & Safety
11	Cook	Ann M. Williams	Democratic	2011	Chair: Energy & Environment; Member: Cybersecurity, Data Analytics, & IT; Judiciary - Civil; Labor & Commerce
12	Cook	Sara Feigenholtz	Democratic	1995	Chair: Adoption & Child Welfare; Member: Appropriations-Human Services; Insurance; Mental Health
12	Cook	Jonathan "Yoni" Pizer	Democratic	2020	
12	Cook	Margaret Croke	Democratic	2021	
13	Cook	Gregory Harris	Democratic	2006	Chair: Rules; Member: Appropriations-Human Services; Personnel & Pensions
14	Cook	Kelly M. Cassidy	Democratic	2011	Chair: Appropriations-Public Safety; Member: Adoption & Child Welfare; Human Services; Judiciary - Criminal; Labor & Commerce; Prescription Drug Affordability
15	Cook	John C. D'Amico	Democratic	2004	Chair: Transportation: Vehicles & Safety; Member: Labor & Commerce; Transportation: Regulation, Roads; Veterans' Affairs
16	Cook	Lou Lang	Democratic	1987	
16	Cook	Yehiel M. Kalish	Democratic	2019	Member: Appropriations-Capital; Child Care Access & Early Childhood; Consumer Protection; Elementary & Secondary Education: Administration, Licensing & Charter; Human Services; Prescription Drug Affordability
17	Cook	Jennifer Gong-Gershowitz	Democratic	2019	Member: Appropriations-Human Services; Elementary & Secondary Education: School Curriculum & Policies; Higher Education; Judiciary - Civil; Mental Health
18	Cook	Robyn Gabel	Democratic	2010	Chair: Appropriations-Human Services; Member: Energy & Environment; Insurance; Museums, Arts, & Cultural Enhancement
19	Cook	Robert Martwick	Democratic	2013	Chair: Personnel & Pensions; Member: Elementary & Secondary Education: School Curriculum & Policies; Energy & Environment; Labor & Commerce; Public Utilities; Revenue & Finance
19	Cook	Lindsey LaPointe	Democratic	2019	Member: Appropriations-Public Safety; Elementary & Secondary Education: School Curriculum & Policies; Energy & Environment; Labor & Commerce; Mental Health
20	Cook	Michael P. McAuliffe	Republican	1996	
20	Cook	Bradley Stephens	Republican	2019	Member: Appropriations-Elementary & Secondary Education; Cybersecurity, Data Analytics, & IT; Financial Institutions; Health Care Licenses; Veterans' Affairs
21	Cook	Celina Villanueva	Democratic	2018	Member: Health Care Availability & Accessibility; Appropriations-Human Services; Higher Education; Labor & Commerce; Public Utilities.
21	Cook	Edgar Gonzalez Jr.	Democratic	2020	
22	Cook	Michael J. Madigan	Democratic	1971	
23	Cook	Michael J. Zalewski	Democratic	2008	Chair: Revenue & Finance; Member: Appropriations-General Service; Health Care Licenses; Insurance; Judiciary - Criminal; Personnel & Pensions
24	Cook	Elizabeth Hernandez	Democratic	2007	Chair: Consumer Protection; Member: Appropriations-Elementary & Secondary Education; Appropriations-Human Services; Health Care Licenses; Higher Education
25	Cook	Curtis J. Tarver II	Democratic	2019	Member: Appropriations-Elementary & Secondary Education; Child Care Access & Early Childhood; Financial Institutions; Judiciary - Civil
26	Cook	Christian L. Mitchell	Democratic	2013	
26	Cook	Kambium Buckner	Democratic	2019	Member: Appropriations-Elementary & Secondary Education; Child Care Access & Early Childhood; Higher Education; Judiciary - Criminal; Transportation: Vehicles & Safety
27	Cook	Justin Slaughter	Democratic	2017	Chair: Judiciary - Criminal; Member: Appropriations-Capital; Child Care Access & Early Childhood; Special Investigating Committee; State Government Administration
28	Cook	Robert Rita	Democratic	2003	Chair: Appropriations-General Service; Member: Consumer Protection; Cybersecurity, Data Analytics, & IT; Executive; Health Care Licenses; Revenue & Finance
29	Cook, Will	Thaddeus Jones	Democratic	2011	Chair: Insurance; Member: Appropriations-Capital; Consumer Protection; Judiciary - Civil; Labor & Commerce; Prescription Drug Affordability
30	Cook	William Davis	Democratic	2003	Member: Appropriations-Capital; Appropriations-Elementary & Secondary Education; Appropriations-Public Safety; Energy & Environment; International Trade & Commerce, Labor & Commerce
31	Cook	Mary E. Flowers	Democratic	1985	Chair: Health Care Availability & Accessibility; Member: Human Services; Prescription Drug Affordability
32	Cook	André Thapedi	Democratic	2009	Chair: International Trade & Commerce; Judiciary - Civil; Member: Appropriations-Capital; Energy & Environment; Public Utilities
33	Cook	Marcus C. Evans Jr.	Democratic	2012	Chair: Labor & Commerce; Member: Appropriations-General Service; Executive; Revenue & Finance; Transportation: Regulation, Roads; Transportation: Vehicles & Safety
34	Cook, Kankakee, Will	Nicholas K. Smith	Democratic	2018	Member: Appropriations-Higher Education; Child Care Access & Early Childhood; Economic Opportunity & Equity; Energy & Environment; International Trade & Commerce, Prescription Drug Affordability
35	Cook	Frances Ann Hurley	Democratic	2013	Chair: Human Services; Member: Appropriations-Capital; Energy & Environment; Labor & Commerce; Museums, Arts, & Cultural Enhancement
36	Cook	Kelly M. Burke	Democratic	2011	Member: Agriculture & Conservation, Appropriations-Higher Education; Elementary & Secondary Education: Administration, Licensing & Charter; Health Care Licenses; Higher Education; Museums, Arts, & Cultural Enhancement, Personnel & Pensions
37	Cook, Will	Margo McDermed	Republican	2015	Member: Appropriations-Capital; Judiciary - Civil; Judiciary - Criminal; Museums, Arts, & Cultural Enhancement, Revenue & Finance; Special Investigating Committee; Transportation: Regulation, Roads
37	Cook, Will	Tim Ozinga	Republican	2021	Member: Appropriations-Capital; Judiciary - Criminal; Museums, Arts, & Cultural Enhancement; Revenue & Finance
38	Cook, Will	Debbie Meyers-Martin	Democratic	2019	Member: Appropriations-General Service; Appropriations-Higher Education; Child Care Access & Early Childhood; Cities & Villages; Economic Opportunity & Equity; Insurance
39	Cook	Will Guzzardi	Democratic	2015	Chair: Prescription Drug Affordability; Member: Economic Opportunity & Equity; Judiciary - Criminal; Mental Health
40	Cook	Jaime M. Andrade Jr.	Democratic	2013	Chair: Cybersecurity, Data Analytics, & IT; Member: Appropriations-Capital; Financial Institutions; Human Services; Labor & Commerce
41	DuPage, Will	Grant Wehrli	Republican	2015	Member: Appropriations-Capital; Appropriations-General Service; Cities & Villages; Executive; Labor & Commerce; Public Utilities; Special Investigating Committee
42	DuPage	Amy Grant	Republican	2019	Member: Adoption & Child Welfare; Appropriations-Capital; Appropriations-Elementary & Secondary Education; Consumer Protection; Financial Institutions; Museums, Arts, & Cultural Enhancement
43	Cook, Kane	Anna Moeller	Democratic	2014	Chair: Health Care Licenses; Member: Appropriations-Human Services; Economic Opportunity & Equity; Energy & Environment; Insurance
44	Cook	Fred Crespo	Democratic	2007	Chair: Special Investigating Committee; Member: Appropriations-General Service; Elementary & Secondary Education: Administration, Licensing & Charter; Elementary & Secondary Education: School Curriculum & Policies; Mental Health; Public Utilities
45	Cook, DuPage	Diane Pappas	Democratic	2019	Member: Adoption & Child Welfare; Appropriations-General Service; Cities & Villages; Cybersecurity, Data Analytics, & IT; Prescription Drug Affordability
46	DuPage	Deb Conroy	Democratic	2013	Chair: Mental Health; Member: Appropriations-Capital; Elementary & Secondary Education: School Curriculum & Policies; Financial Institutions; Insurance
47	Cook, DuPage	Deanne M. Mazzochi	Republican	2018	Member: Appropriations-Capital; Appropriations-Public Safety; Energy & Environment; Judiciary - Civil; Labor & Commerce; Prescription Drug Affordability
48	DuPage	Terra Costa Howard	Democratic	2019	Member: Cities & Villages; Elementary & Secondary Education: School Curriculum & Policies; Judiciary - Civil; Mental Health; Transportation: Regulation, Roads; Veterans' Affairs
49	Cook, DuPage, Kane	Karina Villa	Democratic	2019	Member: Appropriations-Elementary & Secondary Education; Elementary & Secondary Education: School Curriculum & Policies; Health Care Availability & Accessibility, Labor & Commerce; Mental Health; Veterans' Affairs
50	Kane, Kendall	Keith R. Wheeler	Republican	2015	Member: Cybersecurity, Data Analytics, & IT; Energy & Environment; Executive; Labor & Commerce; Prescription Drug Affordability; Public Utilities; Revenue & Finance
51	Cook, Lake	Mary Edly-Allen	Democratic	2019	Member: Adoption & Child Welfare; Elementary & Secondary Education: School Curriculum & Policies; Energy & Environment; Human Services; Mental Health; State Government Administration
52	Cook, Kane, Lake, McHenry	David McSweeney	Republican	2013	Member: Counties & Townships; Revenue & Finance
53	Cook	Mark L. Walker	Democratic	2009	Member: Counties & Townships; Economic Opportunity & Equity; Financial Institutions; Insurance; International Trade & Commerce
54	Cook	Thomas Morrison	Republican	2011	Member: Appropriations-General Service; Elementary & Secondary Education: Administration, Licensing & Charter; Energy & Environment; Human Services; Insurance; Personnel & Pensions
55	Cook	Martin J. Moylan	Democratic	2013	Chair: Transportation: Regulation, Roads; Member: Cities & Villages; Counties & Townships; Labor & Commerce; Veterans' Affairs
56	Cook, DuPage	Michelle Mussman	Democratic	2011	Chair: Elementary & Secondary Education: School Curriculum & Policies; Member: Adoption & Child Welfare; Appropriations-Human Services; Energy & Environment; Human Services; Mental Health
57	Cook, Lake	Jonathan Carroll	Democratic	2017	Member: Appropriations-General Service; Counties & Townships; Financial Institutions; Health Care Licenses; Insurance; Revenue & Finance
58	Cook, Lake	Bob Morgan	Democratic	2019	Member: Appropriations-Human Services; Energy & Environment; Health Care Licenses; Insurance; State Government Administration
59	Cook, Lake	Daniel Didech	Democratic	2019	Member: Counties & Townships; Energy & Environment; Judiciary - Civil; State Government Administration
60	Lake	Rita Mayfield	Democratic	2010	Chair: Appropriations-Elementary & Secondary Education; Member: Appropriations-Public Safety; Consumer Protection; Judiciary - Civil; Labor & Commerce; Prescription Drug Affordability
61	Lake	Joyce Mason	Democratic	2019	Member: Agriculture & Conservation, Appropriations-Higher Education; Economic Opportunity & Equity; Elementary & Secondary Education: School Curriculum & Policies; Energy & Environment; Human Services; Museums, Arts, & Cultural Enhancement
62	Lake	Sam Yingling	Democratic	2013	Chair: Counties & Townships; Member: Cities & Villages; Revenue & Finance; Transportation: Regulation, Roads
63	McHenry	Steven Reick	Republican	2017	Member: Appropriations-Elementary & Secondary Education; Consumer Protection; Elementary & Secondary Education: School Curriculum & Policies; Labor & Commerce; Personnel & Pensions; Revenue & Finance
64	Lake, McHenry	Tom Weber	Republican	2019	Member: Appropriations-Human Services; Consumer Protection; Counties & Townships; Judiciary - Civil; Labor & Commerce; Transportation: Regulation, Roads
65	Kane, McHenry	Dan Ugaste	Republican	2019	Member: Appropriations-Capital; Energy & Environment; Health Care Licenses; Labor & Commerce; Museums, Arts, & Cultural Enhancement, Special Investigating Committee
66	Kane, McHenry	Allen Skillicorn	Republican	2017	Member: Appropriations-General Service; Cities & Villages; Cybersecurity, Data Analytics, & IT; Insurance; Labor & Commerce
66	Kane, McHenry	Gary Daugherty	Republican	2021	
67	Winnebago	Maurice A. West II	Democratic	2019	Member: Appropriations-Higher Education; Higher Education; Judiciary - Criminal; Mental Health
68	Winnebago	John M. Cabello	Republican	2012	Member: Appropriations-Capital; Appropriations-Public Safety; Judiciary - Criminal; Labor & Commerce; Transportation: Regulation, Roads
69	Boone, Winnebago	Joe Sosnowski	Republican	2011	Member: Child Care Access & Early Childhood; Cities & Villages; Elementary & Secondary Education: Administration, Licensing & Charter; Executive; Revenue & Finance
70	Boone, DeKalb, Kane	Jeff Keicher	Republican	2018	Member: Agriculture & Conservation, Appropriations-Higher Education; Higher Education; Human Services; Mental Health; State Government Administration; Veterans' Affairs
71	Carroll, Henry, Rock Island, Whiteside	Tony McCombie	Republican	2017	Member: Cities & Villages; Cybersecurity, Data Analytics, & IT; Economic Opportunity & Equity; Elementary & Secondary Education: School Curriculum & Policies; Higher Education; Judiciary - Criminal; Transportation: Regulation, Roads
72	Rock Island	Michael Halpin	Democratic	2017	Member: Agriculture & Conservation, Appropriations-Capital; Judiciary - Criminal; Veterans' Affairs
73	Bureau, LaSalle, Marshall, Peoria, Stark, Woodford	Ryan Spain	Republican	2017	Member: Appropriations-Capital; Executive; Financial Institutions; Mental Health; Prescription Drug Affordability; Public Utilities
74	Bureau, Henry, Knox, Lee, Mercer	Daniel Swanson	Republican	2017	Member: Agriculture & Conservation, Appropriations-Public Safety; Elementary & Secondary Education: School Curriculum & Policies; Mental Health; Veterans' Affairs
75	Grundy, Kendall, LaSalle, Will	David A. Welter	Republican	2016	Member: Appropriations-Capital; Appropriations-Public Safety; Counties & Townships; Energy & Environment; Public Utilities; State Government Administration; Transportation: Vehicles & Safety
76	Bureau, LaSalle, Livingston, Putnam	Lance Yednock	Democratic	2019	Member: Agriculture & Conservation, Labor & Commerce; Transportation: Vehicles & Safety, Veterans' Affairs
77	Cook, DuPage	Kathleen Willis	Democratic	2013	Member: Adoption & Child Welfare; Appropriations-Human Services; Cities & Villages; Counties & Townships; Elementary & Secondary Education: School Curriculum & Policies; Executive; State Government Administration
78	Cook	Camille Y. Lilly	Democratic	2010	Chair: Financial Institutions; Museums, Arts, & Cultural Enhancement; Member: Appropriations-Human Services; Appropriations-Public Safety; Insurance
79	Grundy, Kankakee, Will	Lindsay Parkhurst	Republican	2017	Member: Appropriations-Public Safety; Child Care Access & Early Childhood; Judiciary - Civil; Judiciary - Criminal; Prescription Drug Affordability; Transportation: Regulation, Roads
79	Grundy, Kankakee, Will	Jackie Haas	Republican	2020	Member: Appropriations-Public Safety; Child Care Accessibility & Early Childhood; Judiciary - Criminal; Prescription Drug Affordability; Transportation: Regulation, Roads.
80	Cook, Will	Anthony DeLuca	Democratic	2009	Chair: Cities & Villages; Member: Cybersecurity, Data Analytics, & IT; Health Care Licenses; Insurance
81	DuPage, Will	Anne Stava-Murray	Democratic	2019	Member: Appropriations-Capital; Cybersecurity, Data Analytics, & IT; Elementary & Secondary Education: School Curriculum & Policies; Judiciary - Criminal; Museums, Arts, & Cultural Enhancement
82	Cook, DuPage, Will	Jim Durkin	Republican	1995	
83	Kane	Linda Chapa LaVia	Democratic	2003	
83	Kane	Barbara Hernandez	Democratic	2019 (March)	Member: Cities & Villages; Counties & Townships; Energy & Environment; Higher Education; Special Investigating Committee; State Government Administration
84	DuPage, Kane, Kendall, Will	Stephanie A. Kifowit	Democratic	2013	Chair: State Government Administration; Veterans' Affairs; Member: Adoption & Child Welfare; Appropriations-General Service; Revenue & Finance
85	DuPage, Will	John Connor	Democratic	2017	Member: Appropriations-General Service; Appropriations-Higher Education; Cybersecurity, Data Analytics, & IT; Judiciary - Criminal; Labor & Commerce; Transportation: Regulation, Roads
86	Will	Lawrence Walsh Jr.	Democratic	2012	Chair: Public Utilities; Member: Appropriations-Capital; Counties & Townships; Energy & Environment; Prescription Drug Affordability
87	Logan, Menard, Sangamon, Tazewell	Tim Butler	Republican	2015	Member: Appropriations-Capital; Appropriations-Public Safety; Energy & Environment; Executive; Museums, Arts, & Cultural Enhancement, Public Utilities; Transportation: Vehicles & Safety
88	McLean, Tazewell	Keith P. Sommer	Republican	1999	Member: Adoption & Child Welfare; Financial Institutions; Insurance; International Trade & Commerce
89	Carroll, Jo Daviess, Ogle, Stephenson, Whiteside, Winnebago	Andrew S. Chesney	Republican	2018	Member: Agriculture & Conservation, Appropriations-Human Services; Cities & Villages; Economic Opportunity & Equity; Judiciary - Civil; Mental Health
90	DeKalb, LaSalle, Lee, Ogle, Winnebago	Tom Demmer	Republican	2013	Member: Appropriations-Human Services; Cybersecurity, Data Analytics, & IT; Health Care Availability & Accessibility, Human Services; Prescription Drug Affordability; Rules
91	Fulton, Peoria, Tazewell	Michael D. Unes	Republican	2011	Member: Financial Institutions; Insurance; International Trade & Commerce, Museums, Arts, & Cultural Enhancement, Transportation: Vehicles & Safety, Veterans' Affairs
92	Peoria	Jehan Gordon-Booth	Democratic	2009	Member: Appropriations-Capital; Appropriations-Public Safety; Child Care Access & Early Childhood; Economic Opportunity & Equity; Executive; Public Utilities
93	Brown, Cass, Fulton, Knox, Mason, McDonough, Schuyler, Warren	Norine K. Hammond	Republican	2010	Member: Appropriations-Higher Education; Consumer Protection; Cybersecurity, Data Analytics, & IT; Higher Education; Human Services; Insurance
94	Adams, Hancock, Henderson, Warren	Randy E. Frese	Republican	2015	Member: Agriculture & Conservation, Appropriations-Human Services; Child Care Access & Early Childhood; Health Care Licenses; Labor & Commerce; Veterans' Affairs
95	Christian, Macoupin, Madison, Montgomery	Avery Bourne	Republican	2015	Member: Appropriations-Capital; Appropriations-Elementary & Secondary Education; Counties & Townships; Elementary & Secondary Education: School Curriculum & Policies; International Trade & Commerce
96	Christian, Macon, Sangamon	Sue Scherer	Democratic	2013	Chair: Elementary & Secondary Education: Administration, Licensing & Charter; Member: Appropriations-Capital; Child Care Access & Early Childhood; Consumer Protection; Transportation: Regulation, Roads
97	Kendall, Will	Mark Batinick	Republican	2015	Member: Health Care Licenses; Insurance; International Trade & Commerce, Personnel & Pensions
98	Will	Natalie A. Manley	Democratic	2013	Member: Counties & Townships; Executive; Financial Institutions; Human Services; Rules; Transportation: Regulation, Roads; Transportation: Vehicles & Safety
99	Sangamon	Mike Murphy	Republican	2019	Member: Adoption & Child Welfare; Appropriations-Higher Education; Financial Institutions; Museums, Arts, & Cultural Enhancement, State Government Administration; Transportation: Vehicles & Safety, Veterans' Affairs
100	Calhoun, Greene, Jersey, Macoupin, Madison, Morgan, Pike, Sangamon, Scott	C.D. Davidsmeyer	Republican	2012	Member: Child Care Access & Early Childhood; Financial Institutions; Health Care Licenses; Insurance; Public Utilities
101	Champaign, DeWitt, Macon, McLean, Piatt	Dan Caulkins	Republican	2019	Member: Appropriations-General Service; Energy & Environment; Prescription Drug Affordability; Public Utilities
102	Champaign, Douglas, Edgar, Macon, Moultrie, Shelby, Vermilion	Brad Halbrook	Republican	2012	Member: Appropriations-General Service; Cities & Villages; Counties & Townships; State Government Administration
103	Champaign	Carol Ammons	Democratic	2015	Chair: Higher Education; Member: Appropriations-Higher Education; Energy & Environment; Personnel & Pensions; Public Utilities
104	Champaign, Vermilion	Michael T. Marron	Republican	2018	Member: Counties & Townships; Economic Opportunity & Equity; Energy & Environment; Higher Education; Human Services; Transportation: Regulation, Roads
105	Livingston, McLean	Dan Brady	Republican	2001	Member: Appropriations-Higher Education; Consumer Protection; Counties & Townships; Higher Education; Insurance; Prescription Drug Affordability; Rules
106	Ford, Iroquois, Livingston, Vermilion, Woodford	Thomas M. Bennett	Republican	2015	Member: Appropriations-Elementary & Secondary Education; Child Care Access & Early Childhood; Elementary & Secondary Education: School Curriculum & Policies; Health Care Availability & Accessibility, Labor & Commerce; Revenue & Finance
107	Bond, Clinton, Effingham, Fayette, Marion	Blaine Wilhour	Republican	2019	Member: Adoption & Child Welfare; Judiciary - Criminal; Labor & Commerce; Personnel & Pensions; Transportation: Vehicles & Safety
108	Clinton, Madison, St. Clair, Washington	Charles Meier	Republican	2013	Member: Agriculture & Conservation, Appropriations-Human Services; Economic Opportunity & Equity; Elementary & Secondary Education: School Curriculum & Policies; Energy & Environment; Mental Health
109	Clay, Edwards, Effingham, Jasper, Lawrence, Richland, Wabash, Wayne, White	Darren Bailey	Republican	2019	Member: Agriculture & Conservation, Appropriations-Elementary & Secondary Education; Appropriations-Human Services; Child Care Access & Early Childhood; Elementary & Secondary Education: Administration, Licensing & Charter; Energy & Environment
110	Clark, Coles, Crawford, Cumberland, Edgar, Lawrence	Chris Miller	Republican	2019	Member: Adoption & Child Welfare; Appropriations-General Service; Economic Opportunity & Equity; Elementary & Secondary Education: School Curriculum & Policies; Energy & Environment
111	Jersey, Madison	Monica Bristow	Democratic	2017	Member: Agriculture & Conservation, Economic Opportunity & Equity; Higher Education; Human Services; Mental Health; Prescription Drug Affordability; Veterans' Affairs
112	Madison, St. Clair	Katie Stuart	Democratic	2017	Member: Appropriations-Elementary & Secondary Education; Consumer Protection; Elementary & Secondary Education: School Curriculum & Policies; Higher Education; Labor & Commerce; Museums, Arts, & Cultural Enhancement
113	Madison, St. Clair	Jay Hoffman	Democratic	1991	Member: Appropriations-Capital; Higher Education; Judiciary - Civil; Judiciary - Criminal; Labor & Commerce; Public Utilities
114	St. Clair	LaToya Greenwood	Democratic	2017	Member: Appropriations-Elementary & Secondary Education; Appropriations-Public Safety; Counties & Townships; Health Care Availability & Accessibility, International Trade & Commerce, Labor & Commerce; Museums, Arts, & Cultural Enhancement
115	Jackson, Jefferson, Perry, Union, Washington	Terri Bryant	Republican	2015	Member: Appropriations-Higher Education; Health Care Licenses; Higher Education; Human Services; Insurance; Judiciary - Criminal
116	Monroe, Perry, Randolph, St. Clair	Jerry Costello II	Democratic	2011	
116	Monroe, Perry, Randolph, St. Clair	Nathan D. Reitz	Democratic	2019	Member: Agriculture & Conservation; Appropriations-Capital; Energy & Environment; Labor & Commerce; Transportation: Vehicles & Safety, Veterans' Affairs
117	Franklin, Hamilton, Williamson	Dave Severin	Republican	2017	Member: Appropriations-Higher Education; Elementary & Secondary Education: School Curriculum & Policies; Energy & Environment; Higher Education; Mental Health; Veterans' Affairs
118	Alexander, Gallatin, Hamilton, Hardin, Jackson, Johnson, Massac, Pope, Pulaski, Saline, Union	Patrick Windhorst	Republican	2019	Member: Appropriations-Human Services; Economic Opportunity & Equity; Higher Education; Human Services; Judiciary - Criminal; Mental Health

== See also ==
- List of Illinois state legislatures

== Works cited ==
- "Legislators' Portraits and Biographies", in Illinois Secretary of State (2019). Illinois Blue Book 2019–2020. Archived from the original on April 18, 2020.
