= Jared Ploger =

American politician

Member of the Illinois Senate from the 42nd district
- Member-elect
- Assumed office January 13, 2027
- Preceded by: Linda Holmes

Personal details
- Party: Democratic
- Education: Northern Illinois University; Olivet Nazarene University
- Website: Campaign website

Jared Ploger is an American politician. A member of the Democratic Party, was elected to the Illinois Senate in 2026, representing the 42nd district. He succeeded fellow Democrat Linda Holmes in the 2026 election. He is a teachers union leader.
