= Viverito =

Viverito is a surname. Notable people with the surname include:

- Louis Viverito, American politician
- Melissa Mark-Viverito (born 1969), American politician
