= Carina Santa Maria =

American politician

Member-elect of the Illinois Senate from the 27th district
- Assuming office TBD
- Succeeding: Mark L. Walker

Personal details
- Born: Carina Homann
- Party: Democratic
- Education: The University of Tampa; Dominican University (MSW)

Carina Homann Santa Maria is an American social worker and politician who is the Democratic member-elect for the 27th district of the Illinois Senate.

== Biography ==
Santa Maria is the daughter of Armin Homann, a World War II refugee from Germany who came to Chicago in 1960 as a professional soccer player. She graduated from The University of Tampa with a bachelor's degree in psychology and criminology in 2007, then earned a Master of Social Work in 2011 and worked as an adjunct instructor at Dominican University. She worked as CEO of child welfare agency Shelter Youth and Family Services from 2018 until stepping down in September 2026.

In April 2025, Santa Maria was elected as a trustee of Arlington Heights. In August 2025, she announced her campaign to succeed incumbent Democratic state senator Mark L. Walker, who was retiring, in the 27th district. She won the Democratic nomination uncontested.
