= Louis Viverito =

American politician

Stickney Township Supervisor
- In office May 1973 – May 12, 2025
- Preceded by: Howard T. Scheulin
- Succeeded by: Diane M. Viverito

Member of the Illinois Senate from the 11th district
- In office January 1995 – January 2011
- Preceded by: Gary LaPaille
- Succeeded by: Steven M. Landek

Personal details
- Born: Chicago, Illinois
- Party: Democratic
- Other political affiliations: Township Service Party
- Spouse: Carolyn Viverito
- Children: Three

Military service
- Allegiance: United States
- Branch/service: United States Army
- Battles/wars: Korean War

Louis S. Viverito (born May 6, 1931) is a former Democratic member of the Illinois Senate, representing the 11th district from 1995 until his resignation in 2011.

== Public service ==
Born in Chicago, Viverito served in the Korean War, and is a three-time decorated veteran. In 1969, after moving to what soon aferward became suburban Burbank, he began his career in public service when he was elected Stickney Township Democratic Committeeman. Viverito was later elected as a delegate in the 1972 Democratic National Convention.

Beginning in 1973, Viverito served as the supervisor of Stickney Township and president of Stickney Township's Public Health District. He succeeded Howard T. Scheulin, who chose not to seek re-election. Viverito also worked as a commissioner of the Metropolitan Sanitary District of Greater Chicago (now the Water Reclamation District) from 1980 to 1986. He was later appointed as a member of the Cook County Zoning Board of Appeals.

Viverito has been active in many community organizations. His positions include local chairman of the Chicago Lung Association and former chairman of the Burbank Chamber of Commerce. Currently, Viverito is an associate member for the Crisis Center of South Suburbia for Abused Women, a life member of the Veterans of Foreign Wars, a member of the American Legion and a former member of the Moraine Valley Community College Economic Development Board.

== Senate career ==
Viverito was elected in 1994 as state senator. Viverito served as Minority Whip for the Senate Democratic Caucus for two years; in 2001 he was selected to serve as Assistant Majority Leader. He was a popular senator.

Viverito was named Democratic Legislator of the Year in 2000 by the Illinois State Crime Commission and Outstanding Legislator in 1999 by the Illinois Health Care Association.

Viverito served on seven committees: Appropriations II, Executive Subcommittee of Licensed Activities, Executive Subcommittee for State and Local Government, Executive, Executive Appointments, Mobile Homes, and Rules.

In June 2007, Viverito was told by Democratic Senate President Emil Jones that he was not welcome in a closed-door Senate meeting and was replaced on the Senate Rules Committee, allegedly due to Viverito's loyalty to Jones' rival, House Speaker Michael Madigan, whose district largely overlapped Viverito's.

Viverito sponsored a bill raising the eligibility threshold for senior citizens qualifying for the senior citizens property tax assessment freeze. This law helps more individuals qualify for an assessment freeze by raising the income threshold from $35,000 to $40,000. This caps the annual increases on the property tax assessment of the homes of individuals 65 years or older who have applied for the freeze.

== Personal life ==
Viverito and his wife, Carolyn, had three children and five grandchildren. In 2005 his daughter Diane Viverito was elected to succeed him as township supervisor; his son Dean served as Burbank's city treasurer from 2001 to 2021, when Dean was succeeded by his own son David. Louis Viverito's daughter Marianne was killed at age 55 in a domestic stabbing in 2017; her son Steven Chmela was eventually found not guilty by reason of insanity.
