= Steven Landek =

American politician

Steve Landek

Member of the Illinois Senate
- In office February 5, 2011 – January 11, 2023
- Preceded by: Louis Viverito
- Succeeded by: Mike Porfirio
- Constituency: 11th district (2011–2013); 12th district (2013–2023)

Personal details
- Born: December 23, 1955 (age 70) Chicago, Illinois, U.S.
- Party: Democratic
- Education: Roosevelt University (BA)

Steven M. Landek (born December 23, 1955) is an American politician who serves as the mayor of Bridgeview, Illinois and the Lyons Township Democratic Committeeman. He was appointed as a member of the Illinois Senate for the 11th district in 2011 following the resignation of Louis Viverito. Following a state-wide redistricting in 2011, he represented the 12th district from 2013 to 2023, serving as state senator for all or parts of Bridgeview, Burbank, Bedford Park, McCook, Brookfield, Riverside, Berwyn, and Cicero.

As mayor, Landek oversaw the construction of Toyota Park (now SeatGeek Stadium), the former home of the Chicago Fire Soccer Club and the Chicago Red Stars. He was appointed by governor J.B. Pritzker as a board member of the Illinois Finance Authority on August 28, 2023, and was re-appointed to the position on July 18, 2025.

Landek also co-owns Southwest Regional Publishing, which publishes local newspapers such as The Reporter and the Desplaines Valley News.

== State senator ==
During his final term as state senator, Landek served as chairman of the State Government Committee (SGOA) and as a member of the following committees: Appropriations - Veterans Affairs (SAPP-SAVA), Ethics (SETH), Insurance (SINS), Insurance Mandates (SINS-INMD), Local Government (SLGV), and Redistricting - South Cook County (SRED-SRSC).

In 2022, Landek withdrew from the Democratic primary for his state senate seat after initially filing to run, allowing his former chief of staff, Mike Porfirio, to run unopposed. Porfirio would go on to succeed Landek as state senator.
