= Patrick Hanley =

American politician

Member-elect of the Illinois Senate from the 9th district
- Assuming office January 13, 2027
- Succeeding: Laura Fine

Personal details
- Party: Democratic

Patrick Hanley is an American politician who is Member-elect of the Illinois Senate from the 9th district.
