= Sally Turner =

American politician

Member of the Illinois Senate from the 44th district
- Incumbent
- Assumed office January 25, 2021
- Preceded by: Bill Brady

Personal details
- Party: Republican
- Spouse: John Turner
- Education: University of Illinois (B.S.); Lincoln Christian University (M.S.)
- Website: https://senatorsallyturner.com

Sally Turner is an American politician serving as a member of the Illinois Senate from the 44th district. Nominated on January 25, 2021, she succeeded Minority Leader Bill Brady.

== Education ==
Turner earned a Bachelor of Arts degree in legal studies from the University of Illinois at Urbana–Champaign and a Master of Science in organizational leadership from Lincoln Christian University.

== Career ==
After earning her master's degree, Turner worked as a juvenile probation officer and paralegal in the office of the Logan County State's Attorney.

Turner was previously the County Clerk of Logan County from 1994 until 2018. During her time in office, Sally was an active member of the Illinois County Officials Association and the Illinois Association of County Clerks and Recorders. She served the Illinois Association of County Clerks and Recorders as a member of numerous committees and was elected their president in 2015. While serving as Logan County Clerk, Sally returned to college part-time and earned a master's degree from Lincoln Christian University in Organizational Leadership. There, she also taught Citizens and Government classes for 13 years. In 2018, Turner chose not to seek re-election for Logan County Clerk, instead choosing to provide support and assistance for her aging parents. From 2018 to 2020, Turner opened her own consulting business that assisted local government entities with budgets, levies, and the Property Tax Limitation Law.

Turner was appointed to the Illinois Senate by Republican leadership on January 25, 2021, to succeed former Minority Leader Bill Brady. The 44th district includes all or parts of McLean County, Illinois, Menard, Sangamon, and Tazewell counties.

She currently serves on the following committees: Assignments; Agriculture; Approp Ed; Early Childhood Education; Higher Education; Revenue; State Government (Co-chair).

== Personal life ==
She and her husband, Appellate Court Justice John Turner, live in Beason, Illinois.

== Electoral history ==
2022 Illinois State Senate District 44 General Election
Party	Candidate	Votes	%
Republican	Sally Turner	75,666	100.0
Total votes		75,666	100.0
