= Chris Balkema =

American politician

Member of the Illinois Senate from the 53rd district
- Incumbent
- Assumed office January 8, 2025
- Preceded by: Thomas M. Bennett

Personal details
- Born: 1970 or 1971 (age 55–56)
- Party: Republican
- Education: Taylor University (BS); Bradley University (MBA)
- Website: Official website

Chris Balkema is an American politician and member of the Illinois Senate from the 53rd district. The 53rd district includes all or portions of Bureau, Ford, Grundy, Iroquois, LaSalle, Marshall, McLean, Peoria, Putnam, Tazewell, Will, and Woodford counties in central Illinois. Balkema was sworn into office on January 8, 2025.

== Early life and education ==
He has a has a B.S. in business systems from Taylor University. He has since held advisory positions on the Taylor University Business Council. He later earned a M.B.A. from Bradley University. He was hired by Caterpillar in 1993 and has worked there ever since.

== Early political career ==
In 2009, he was elected to the board of Minooka Community High School District 111. In the 2010 general election, he was elected as part of a slate in District 2 that defeated two Democratic incumbents. After David Welter's appointment to the Illinois House of Representatives, Balkema moved from Vice Chair of the Grundy County Board to Chairman. He served as Grundy County Board Chairman 2016 until his election to the Illinois Senate. While chairman, he has served on the Grundy County Economic Development Council.

=== Congressional campaigns ===
After the 2011 decennial reapportionment, Balkema explored a candidacy for the open seat in Illinois's 11th congressional district for the 2012 election. He ultimately decided against running for Congress and instead ran for reelection to the county board. Two years later, Balkema ran in the Republican primary for the 11th district. He was defeated in by State Representative Darlene Senger by a narrow margin of three points.

== Illinois Senate ==
In 2023, Republican appointed incumbent Tom Bennett announced he would not run in the 2024 special election to fill the remainder Jason Barickman's term. Balkema ran for the Republican nomination for the seat alongside Susan Wynn Bence, Bennett's chief of staff, Mike Kirkton, a member of the Livingston County Board, and Jesse Faber. Balkema won the Republican primary and was unopposed in the general election. In the 104th General Assembly, Balkema is the minority spokesperson for the Appropriations - Education committee. He is also assigned to the other following committees: Agriculture; Behavioral and Mental Health; Education; Labor; Pensions; and Revenue.
