= Doris Turner (politician) =

Illinois State Senator

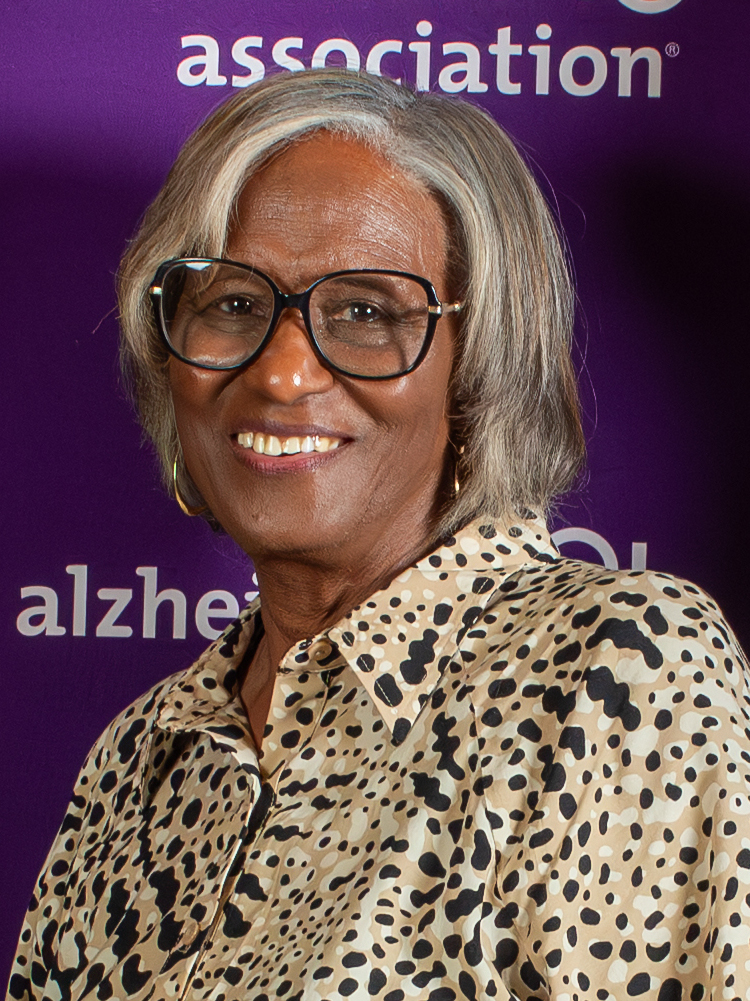
- Turner in 2026

Member of the Illinois Senate from the 48th district
- Incumbent
- Assumed office February 6, 2021
- Preceded by: Andy Manar

Personal details
- Born: Springfield, Illinois, U.S.
- Party: Democratic
- Spouse: Cecil Turner
- Children: 3
- Website: Official website

Doris Turner is an American politician who has served as a member of the Illinois Senate from the 48th district since February 6, 2021. The 48th district, located in the Springfield metropolitan area and partially in the Metro East, includes all or parts of Christian, Macon, Macoupin, Madison, Montgomery, and Sangamon counties.

== Early life, education, and career ==
Turner is a lifelong resident of Springfield, Illinois. She worked for the state of Illinois for 33 years. She worked for the Illinois Department of Public Health for 22 years. She was previously a member of the Springfield City Council and the Sangamon County Board. She was a member of the Springfield/Sangamon County Health Initiative Board of Directors. She is a founding member of the Southern Illinois University Federally Qualified Health Center.

== Illinois Senate ==
Turner was appointed to the Senate after the previous Senator, Andy Manar, resigned his seat to work as a senior advisor for the J. B. Pritzker administration. As of July 2022, Senator Turner is a member of the following Illinois Senate committees:

- Chair of Agriculture Committee (SAGR)
- Member of Appropriations - Health Committee (SAPP-SAHA)
- Member of Redistricting - East Central & Southeast Illinois Committee (SRED-SRSE)
- Member of Redistricting - Southwestern Illinois Committee (SRED-SRSW)
- Member of Redistricting - West Central Illinois Committee (SRED-SRWC)
- Member of State Government Committee (SGOA)
- Member of Tourism and Hospitality Committee (STOU)
- Member of Veterans Affairs Committee (SVET)

== Personal life ==
Turner currently resides in Springfield, Illinois. She and her husband Cecil have three children, ten grandchildren, and five great-grandchildren. She is a member of Grace United Methodist Church and worships at Greater All Nations Tabernacle Church of God in Christ.
