= Michael Halpin =

American politician

- Halpin at Wehrly Memorial Highway Dedication (2026)

Member of the Illinois Senate from the 36th district
- Incumbent
- Assumed office January 11, 2023
- Preceded by: Neil Anderson

Member of the Illinois House of Representatives from the 72nd district
- In office January 10, 2017 – January 11, 2023
- Preceded by: Patrick J. Verschoore
- Succeeded by: Gregg Johnson

Personal details
- Born: 1978 or 1979 (age 46–47) Voorheesville, New York
- Party: Democratic
- Spouse: Mary Ann
- Children: 2
- Education: Roger Williams University (B.A.); University of Illinois (J.D.)
- Occupation: Legislator
- Profession: Politician

Michael Halpin is a Democratic member of the Illinois State Senate representing the 36th district. The 36th district contains portions of Rock Island County, Henry County, Mercer County, Knox County, McDonough County, and Warren County. Cities and villages of the 36th district include; Moline, Rock Island, Galesburg, East Moline, Macomb, Monmouth, Silvis, Milan, Colona, Coal Valley, Knoxville, Bushnell, Carbon Cliff, Hampton, Orion, Roseville, Alexis, East Galesburg, Sherrard, Alpha, New Windsor, North Henderson, Rio, and Good Hope. He first took office in January 2017, when he was elected as State Representative of the 72nd district in Illinois.

He previously worked for Lane Evans, a member of the US House of Representatives.

He and his wife MaryAnn married in 2005.

As of June 29, 2023, Halpin chaired the Illinois Senate committee on Higher Education and was on the Judiciary, State Government, Veterans Affairs, and Appropriations- Education committees.
