= Dale Fowler =

American politician

Member of the Illinois Senate from the 59th district
- In office January 11, 2017 – May 31, 2026
- Preceded by: Gary Forby
- Succeeded by: Paul Jacobs

Mayor of Harrisburg, Illinois
- In office September 2014 – December 2016
- Preceded by: Ron Crank
- Succeeded by: John McPeek

Personal details
- Born: Eldorado, Illinois
- Party: Republican
- Spouse: Jill Fowler
- Children: 2
- Profession: Businessman and Legislator
- Website: https://senatorfowler.com

Dale Fowler is an American politician who has served as a Republican member of the Illinois Senate from January 2017 to May 2026. Fowler represented the 59th district, which includes all of Franklin, Hamilton, Williamson, Saline, Gallatin, Hardin, Pope, Massac, Johnson, Pulaski, and Alexander counties and portions of Union and Jackson counties in Southern Illinois. Prior to his election to the Illinois Senate he was mayor of Harrisburg and a member of the Saline County Board.

== Early life and career ==
Fowler was hired by the Illinois Department of Justice in 1989. He transferred to the Illinois Department of Corrections in 1992. He continued with state government and retired from Illinois Department of Juvenile Justice in 2012 and took a position with Peoples National Bank. He has 2 children with his wife Jill Fowler. Fowler is a Presbyterian.

== Local politics ==
After the 2002 Republican primary, the Saline County Republican Party slated Fowler to run for county board after only nine Republicans filed for 13 seats. Fowler was elected while Republicans won a majority on the Saline County Board for the first time in twenty-five years. Fowler was an unsuccessful candidate for reelection in 2006. Democratic candidate Chuck Ingram defeated Fowler by a single vote; 4,020 votes to 4,019 votes. In July 2013, after the elevation of Ron Crank from mayor pro tem to mayor of Harrisburg, the Harrisburg City Commission appointed Dale Fowler as the public properties commissioner. On August 21, 2014, Fowler was appointed Mayor of Harrisburg to fill the vacancy created by Ron Crank's death. The city council appointed Wayne Horstmann as Fowler's successor. Fowler was elected mayor in the April 2015 general election.

== State Senate ==
In 2016, Fowler defeated incumbent Gary Forby (D), who had represented the district for 14 years. He took office in January 2017. In 2018, Democrat J. B. Pritzker appointed Fowler a member of the gubernatorial transition's Job Creation and Economic Opportunity Committee. Fowler served on the following committees: Energy and Public Utilities; Higher Education (Co-Chair); Licensed Activities; Local Government; Transportation.

Fowler chose not to run for reelection in the 2026 election. He resigned from the Illinois Senate at the end of the regular session in 2026. Shortly after his resignation, he accepted a position as president of University Correctional Health Care Solutions, a government contractor that provides healthcare services in prisons. Paul Jacobs, the incumbent state representative from the 118th district and Republican nominee for the 59th district in the 2026 general election, was appointed by the Republican Party chairmen in the district to succeed Fowler.

== Electoral history ==
2016 Illinois State Senate District 59 General Election
Party	Candidate	Votes	%
Republican	Dale Fowler	53,501	55.15
Democratic	Gary Forby (Incumbent)	43,503	44.85
Total votes		97,503	100.0

2018 Illinois State Senate District 59 General Election
Party	Candidate	Votes	%
Republican	Dale Fowler	50,475	61.1
Democratic	Steve Webb	32,125	38.9
Total votes		82,600	100.0

2022 Illinois State Senate District 59 General Election
Party	Candidate	Votes	%
Republican	Dale Fowler	65,708	100.0
Total votes		65,708	100.0
