= Illinois State Board of Elections =

Independent government agency of Illinois, US

State Board of Elections
Board overview
- Jurisdiction: Illinois
- Board executive: Steve Sandvoss, Executive Director
- Key document: Illinois Election Code (10 ILCS 5)
- Website: www.elections.il.gov

The State Board of Elections (SBE) is an independent agency of the U.S. state of Illinois. The SBE, as an acronym, refers both to the eight-member bipartisan board of directors and to the agency that it oversees. The members of the SBE, who are appointed by the Governor of Illinois, in turn appoint an executive director who is responsible for the day-to-day management of the agency. The agency is headquartered in the state capital of Springfield, with a second headquarters in Chicago.

In August 2016, the FBI announced that an SBE database containing electoral roll information had been breached by a foreign hacker, possibly from Russia. Officials were still investigating whether the hacker was able to change any information in the database. A similar attack was made on a voter database in Arizona.

== Responsibilities ==
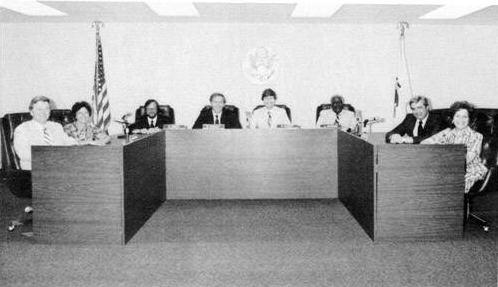
board meeting, circa 1981

The State Board of Elections administers the election laws of the State of Illinois. In this capacity, it oversees the local election commissions, accepts nominating petitions and certificates of nomination, certifies the names of valid candidates for election, accepts and cross-checks the vote totals reported after Election Day, and accepts financial disclosures from the candidates' campaign committees.
