= Veto session =

Legislative session when vetoed bills are re-assessed

A veto session, also referred to as a veto review session, is a type of meeting held by state legislatures in the United States, used to reassess bills that have been vetoed by the governor of the state. State legislatures typically schedule the sessions in advance and only take up vetoed bills for discussion during the meetings. Veto sessions vary in length and time. The state legislature is in session for days. The duration if how many sessions depends on how many vetoed bills by the governor requires further study as well as how many of the vetoed bills the legislature wishes to discuss. State legislatures are no longer required if the representatives do not wish to overturn the vetoed bills. During veto sessions, discussions are conducted to sway the votes of members either in favor of or against the veto, after the discussions, members of the legislative body then vote and once the votes are tallied and a majority decision has been reached the Representatives may either vote to sustain or repeal the veto. When the final decision has been made the session adjourns.

== Background ==
Every state in the United States grants the veto power to the executive branch of the government. The influence of the veto varies in each state, however, due to the specific provisions of each state constitution. Both chambers of state legislatures are required to meet a threshold of votes in order to overturn the governor's veto. Veto sessions are held as a check and balance of state legislators to the veto power of the Governor.

Veto sessions may prolong the process of passing legislation in state governments in the United States, as they allow for a second round of discussion on bills that have already been passed. Veto sessions also provide for a distribution of power among the branches of state governments in the United States and lead to an increase in the possibility of compromise among legislators and governors. Compromise is possible in state legislatures which provide line item veto power, amendatory veto power, and reduction veto to the state governor. These types of veto power allow the governor express his/her disapproval of a bill or a section of a bill without rejecting the entire bill. During a veto session, the state legislature may discuss the bill that has been partially vetoed and make amendments as per the governor's request. State representatives may discuss many vetoed bills at once during veto sessions of legislatures. An abundance of vetoed bills may cause legislatures to choose certain bills that are worth the time and effort to override, over others, automatically sustaining the vetoed bills that were not discussed and therefore concurring to the governor's objections.

== History ==
The term veto session was established in 1994 in Montpelier, Vermont. The Vermont state governor, Howard Dean, vetoed ten bills which were then all discussed in one legislative session. Before this occurrence, vetoes of such volume were unprecedented and individual vetoes were taken up in regular state legislative sessions for discussion. The development of scheduled veto sessions provided a set time and agenda for discussion. Some states such as Colorado, Idaho, Oklahoma, Tennessee and Virginia still do not require the scheduling of veto sessions in addressing gubernatorial vetoes. These states' allows for vetoes to be considered in session immediately upon receipt from the governor.

In the fall of 1990, the Illinois legislature assembled for a veto session to primarily discuss major state finance controversies. The funding for an expansion of the McCormick Place convention center in Chicago, restoring previous budget cuts as well as extending an expiring income tax surcharge were all topics of debate. None of the vetoed bills however were able to rally the votes necessary to override the governor's veto.

In 2014, Governor Jay Nixon of Missouri vetoed 33 bills that were passed by both the Missouri state House and Senate. Although Missouri state law provides the Missouri House with ten days of veto session, the Missouri General Assembly did not discuss all 33 vetoes, but instead brought up mostly vetoed laws pertaining to budget related issues.

Notable veto sessions throughout 2001 and 2010 produced high levels of overrides in Mississippi and South Carolina. In 2001, the Mississippi State Legislature overturned 48 of 58 vetoes by the governor. In 2010, the South Carolina state legislature overturned 36 of 46 vetoes by the governor. In both years, the same party was in control of both the executive and the legislative branches of government. In 2001, Democrats controlled both the legislature and executive in Mississippi. In 2010, Republicans controlled both the legislature and executive in South Carolina.
