= Mike Porfirio =

American politician

Member of the Illinois Senate from the 11th district
- Incumbent
- Assumed office January 11, 2023
- Preceded by: Steven Landek

Personal details
- Party: Democratic
- Spouse: Alana Porfirio
- Children: 1
- Education: U.S. Naval Academy; Purdue University; University of Illinois Chicago

Military service
- Allegiance: United States
- Branch/service: United States Navy
- Years of service: 2004–2010 (active); 2010–present (reserve)
- Rank: Commander

Mike Porfirio is an American politician. He serves as a Democratic member for the 11th district of the Illinois Senate. The 11th district includes all or parts of Bedford Park, Berwyn, Bridgeview, Brookfield, Burbank, Cicero, Countryside, Hodgkins, Justice, La Grange, La Grange Park, North Riverside, Riverside, Summit and the Chicago neighborhoods of Ashburn, Clearing, Chicago, Garfield Ridge, West Elsdon, and West Lawn.

== Life and career ==
Porfiro attended the United States Naval Academy and served six years of active service in the United States Navy. As of 2022, he is a Commander in the United States Navy Reserve. He also has graduate degrees from Purdue University and the University of Illinois Chicago.

In the 2022 general election, Porfirio defeated Republican candidate Thomas "Mac" McGill with 29,811 votes (66.16%) to McGill's 15,077 votes (33.84%).
