= Adriane Johnson =

American politician

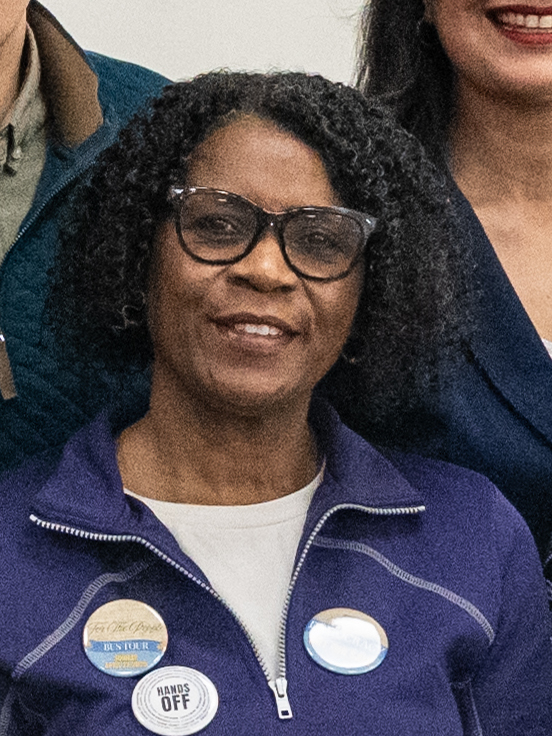
- Adriane Johnson in 2025

Member of the Illinois Senate from the 30th district
- Incumbent
- Assumed office October 11, 2020
- Preceded by: Terry Link

Personal details
- Party: Democratic
- Children: 1
- Education: Columbia College (BLS); Loyola University (MJ)

Adriane Johnson is an American politician serving as a member of the Illinois Senate from the 30th district. Johnson assumed office on October 11, 2020, succeeding Terry Link. The 30th district includes all or part of the municipalities of Beach Park, Buffalo Grove, Green Oaks, Libertyville, Lincolnshire, Mundelein, North Chicago, Riverwoods, Wheeling, Vernon Hills and Waukegan.

== Education ==
Johnson earned a Bachelor of Liberal Studies from Columbia College Chicago and a Master of Jurisprudence in business law from the Loyola University Chicago School of Law.

== Career ==
Following her education, she joined the Illinois Association of Park Districts' (IAPD) Board of Trustees in 2015 and served two years as vice chair and one year as chair-elect.

She was appointed to the Illinois Senate on October 11, 2020, succeeding Terry Link. Johnson is the first African-American state senator to represent Lake County, Illinois. She has continued to serve on the Buffalo Grove Park Board following her appointment until the end of her board term.

As of July 2022, Senator Johnson is a member of the following Illinois Senate committees:

- Appropriations - Agriculture, Environment & Energy Committee (SAPP-SAAE)
- Appropriations - Human Services Committee (SAPP-SAHS)
- Behavioral and Mental Health Committee (SBMH)
- Commerce Committee (SCOM)
- Environment and Conservation Committee (SNVR)
- Ethics Committee (SETH)
- Public Safety Committee (SPUB)
- Redistricting - Lake & McHenry Counties (SRED-SRLM)
- Transportation Committee (STRN)

== Personal life ==
Johnson and her husband, Bruce, have one daughter and live in Buffalo Grove, Illinois.
