= Linda Holmes =

American politician

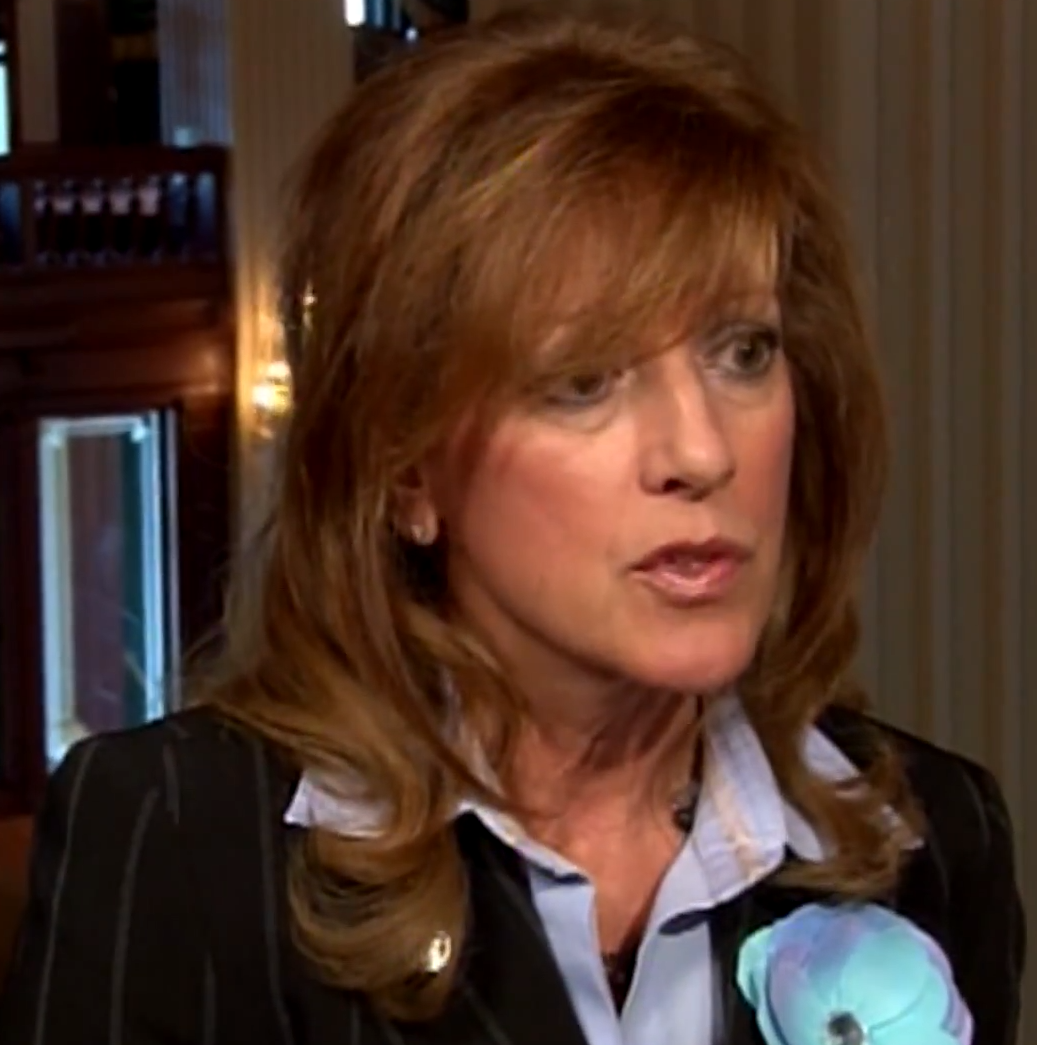

Member of the Illinois Senate from the 42nd district
- Incumbent
- Assumed office January 2007
- Preceded by: Phyllis Petka
- Succeeded by: Jared Ploger (elect)

Personal details
- Born: March 16, 1959 (age 67)
- Party: Democratic
- Spouse: Mike Holmes (divorced)
- Education: National Louis University
- Profession: Small Business Owner

Linda Holmes (born March 16, 1959) is a Democratic member of the Illinois Senate, representing the 42nd District since January 2007. The 42nd district includes all or parts of Aurora, Boulder Hill, Montgomery, Naperville, North Aurora and Oswego.

Prior to her service in the Illinois Senate, she served on the Kane County Board.

== Early life and career ==
A lifelong resident of Illinois, Holmes graduated from National Louis University with a bachelor's degree and worked as a research analyst at Conway-Milliken. She later became a project manager at Data Research before leaving to run a business with her husband at the time, Creative Carpentry Remodelers Inc.

In 2004, Holmes was elected to the Kane County Board where she was chosen to serve on the Forest Preserve District Board.

== Illinois State Senator ==
In 2006, incumbent Edward Petka chose to run for a judgeship on the 12th Circuit Court of Illinois. Holmes defeated Republican candidate and Will County Board member Terri Wintermute. After the election, Edward Petka resigned to assume the judgeship and his wife Phyllis Petka was appointed to fill the vacancy for the remainder of the 94th General Assembly. Senator Holmes was sworn into office in 2007. In the Illinois Senate, Senator Holmes has served as the Chairperson of the State Government & Veterans Affairs Committee. Her other committee assignments are Agriculture and Conservation, Gaming, Labor and Local Government.

On June 22, 2026, Holmes removed herself from the 2026 general election ballot and announced her planned retirement for medical reasons. She plans to resign December 31, 2026. The local Democratic county chairpeople selected teacher and Democratic nominee for the 84th district Jared Ploger to replace Holmes on the ballot.
