= Chapin Rose =

American politician

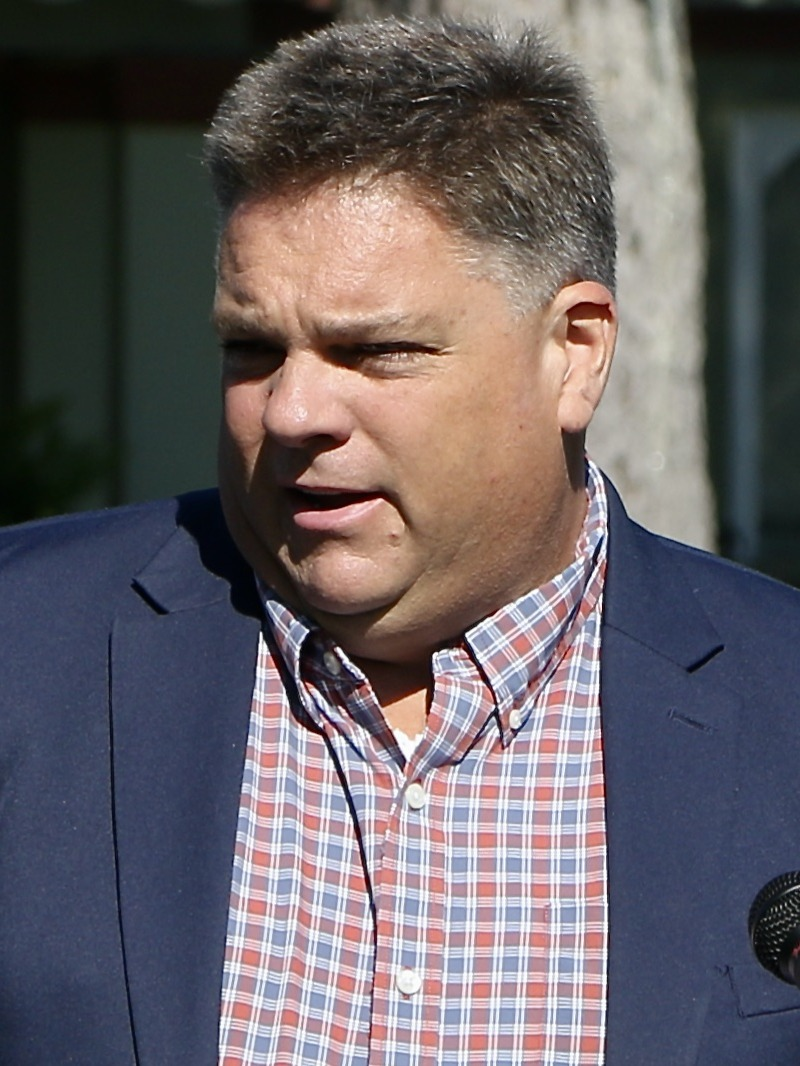

Member of the Illinois Senate from the 51st district
- Incumbent
- Assumed office January 9, 2013
- Preceded by: Kyle McCarter

Member of the Illinois House of Representatives from the 110th district
- In office 2003–2013
- Preceded by: Ron Stephens
- Succeeded by: Brad Halbrook

Personal details
- Born: December 27, 1973 (age 52) Jacksonville, Illinois
- Party: Republican
- Spouse: Camille
- Children: four
- Education: University of Illinois (BS, JD)
- Profession: attorney
- Website: https://senchapinrose.com

Chapin Rose (born December 17, 1973) is a Republican member of the Illinois Senate, representing the 51st district since January 2013. The 51st district includes all or parts of McLean, DeWitt, Macon, Piatt, Shelby, Moultrie, Douglas, Champaign, Vermillion, and Edgar counties in Central Illinois.

He previously served in the Illinois House of Representatives, representing the 110th district from 2003 to 2013.

== Illinois House of Representatives ==
After the 2001 deccenial reapportionment the 110th district was drawn without an incumbent legislator. The "new" district was composed of all of Coles, Douglas, and Piatt counties and portions of Champaign and Edgar counties. Rose won the 2002 Republican primary defeating Lynda Fishel, the former Mayor of Arcola; Ronald Hunt, the Mayor of Villa Grove; and Gerald Smith, a retired U.S. Army Corps of Engineers officer. In the staunchly Republican district, Rose defeated Democratic candidate John Hayden by a two-to-one margin.

In 2009, Rose introduced legislative resolutions to overhaul the trustee selection process at the University of Illinois and demanded additional audits of IllinoisVENTURES after the state auditor found legal violations in a previous investigation.

== Illinois Senate ==
During the 2011 decennial redistricting process, the 51st district was drawn without an incumbent while Rose was drawn into the same House district as fellow Republican Bill Mitchell. Rose opted to run for the "newly" created 51st Senate district while Mitchell ran for re-election in the House. In the 2012 election, Rose defeated Tom Pliura in the Republican primary and ran unopposed in the general election.

Rose currently serves on the following committees: Appropriations (Minority Spokesperson); Approp Ed; Insurance; Judiciary; Transportation; Privacy.

== Republican Party activism ==
Rose was an alternate to the 2000 Republican National Convention in Philadelphia. During the 2008 Republican Party presidential primaries, Rose endorsed the presidential campaign of Rudy Giuliani. Rose served as an Illinois Co-Chair for the 2016 presidential campaign of Senator Ted Cruz. In 2018, Rose defeated Robert Winchester in the election for State Central Committeeman from Illinois's 15th congressional district for the Illinois Republican Party.

== Awards and honors ==
- Bowhay Fellowship Award 2003 – Midwestern Legislative Conference
- Freshman Legislator of the Year – Illinois Health Care Association
- Legislator of the Year – Illinois Drug Education Alliance (IDEA)
- Member – House Republican Rural Economic Development Task force
- Co-Chair – House Republican Methamphetamine Task Force
- Past By-Laws Committee Chair – Legislative Fire Caucus
- University of Illinois Fire Services Institute: Graduate of the “Legislator’s Fire Academy” 2003
- Illinois Farm Bureau Activator “Friend of Agriculture” Award Recipient – Each Term of Office
- Illinois Alcoholism & Drug Dependence Association: “Legislative Leadership Award” 2005
- “Illinois Jaycees Ten Outstanding Young Persons” Award: 2005
- Douglas County Regional Prevention Group: “Certificate of Recognition” for Methamphetamine Awareness in Central Illinois: 2006
- Illinois Reading Council: “Illinois Legislative Award” 2005 – 2006
- Illinois Civil Justice League: “Friends of Fairness” Award: 2007
- Illinois Health Care Association: “Legislator of the Year” Awarded: 2006 & 2007
- Illinois Dollars for Scholars: “Lincolnland Legends Award” 2006
- Illinois Association of Fire Protection Districts: “Legislator of the Year” Award: 2006
- Member Special Investigative Committee Regarding the Impeachment of Rod Blagojevich
- Illinois Council on Long Term Care/ Illinois Health Care Association: “Legislator of the Year” 2007
- Illinois Chamber of Commerce: “Champion of Free Enterprise” Award: 2007 – 2008
- Association of Illinois Soil & Water Conservation Districts: “Friend of Conservation” Award: 2009
- Illinois Bankers Association: “Outstanding Legislator” Award 2009
- Association of Illinois Soil & Water Conservation Districts: “Legislator of the Year” Award: 2011
- Chairman, Legislative Ethics Commission: 2010 – 2012
- Member, House Redistricting Committee: 2010 – 2011
- National Federation of Independent Business: “Guardian of Small Business Award” 2011 – 2012
- Illinois Education Association Region 9: “Friend and Advocate” Award: 2012
- Inaugural Class of the “Edgar Fellows Program” 2012
- Illinois Leadership Council for Agriculture Education’s -Jim Guilinger Legislative Award-2013
- Friend of Agriculture Award from the Illinois Farm Bureau 2014
- Guardian of Small Business Award from the National Federation of Independent Businesses (NFIB) 2014
- YMCA Legislative Hero Award 2015
- Friend of Agriculture Award 2016
- Guardian of Small Business Award 2016
- Conservative Achievement Award from The American Conservative Union 2016
- John W. Maitland Jr. Biotechnology Leadership Award from the Illinois Biotechnology Innovation Organization (iBIO) 2017
- Friend of Agriculture Award (2018)
- Champion of Free Enterprise Award from the Illinois Chamber of Commerce (2018)

== Electoral history ==
2002 Illinois House of Representatives District 110 General Election
Party	Candidate	Votes	%
Republican	Chapin Rose	22,001	66.82
Democratic	John P. Hayden	10,925	33.18
Total votes		32,926	100.0

2004 Illinois House of Representatives District 110 General Election
Party	Candidate	Votes	%
Republican	Chapin Rose	40,515	100.0
Total votes		32,926	100.0

2006 Illinois House of Representatives District 110 General Election
Party	Candidate	Votes	%
Republican	Chapin Rose	28,006	100.0
Total votes		28,006	100.0

2008 Illinois House of Representatives District 110 General Election
Party	Candidate	Votes	%
Republican	Chapin Rose	43,085	100.0
Total votes		43,085	100.0

2010 Illinois House of Representatives District 110 General Election
Party	Candidate	Votes	%
Republican	Chapin Rose	28,724	82.64
Democratic	Dennis Malak	6,035	17.36
Total votes		34,759	100.0

2012 Illinois Senate District 51 General Election
Party	Candidate	Votes	%
Republican	Chapin Rose	86,710	100.0
Total votes		86,710	100.0

2014 Illinois Senate District 51 General Election
Party	Candidate	Votes	%
Republican	Chapin Rose	69,665	100.0
Total votes		69,665	100.0

2018 Illinois Senate District 51 General Election
Party	Candidate	Votes	%
Republican	Chapin Rose	77,252	100.0
Total votes		77,252	100.0

2022 Illinois Senate District 51 General Election
Party	Candidate	Votes	%
Republican	Chapin Rose	72,990	100.0
Total votes		72,990	100.0
