= Andrew Chesney =

American politician (born 1982)

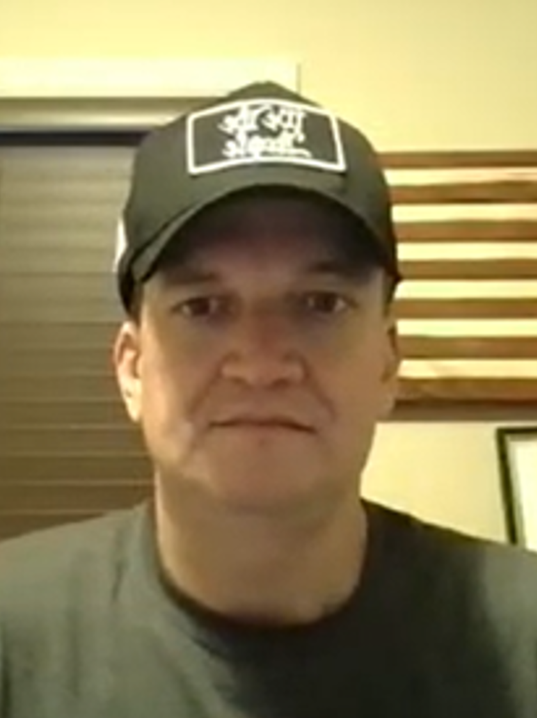

Member of the Illinois Senate from the 45th district
- Incumbent
- Assumed office January 8, 2023
- Preceded by: Brian W. Stewart

Member of the Illinois House of Representatives from the 89th district
- In office December 5, 2018 – January 8, 2023
- Preceded by: Brian W. Stewart
- Succeeded by: Tony McCombie (redistrict)

Personal details
- Born: Andrew Chesney; January 11, 1982 (age 44) Freeport, Illinois, U.S.
- Party: Republican
- Spouse: Kelly Chesney
- Children: One
- Education: Arizona State University (B.A.)
- Profession: Division Sales Manager
- Website: senatorchesney.com

Andrew S. Chesney is an American politician who is an elected Republican member of the Illinois Senate for the 45th district. The 45th district is located in the northwest corner of the state and includes all of Jo Daviess, Stephenson and Carroll counties as well as part of, Ogle, Winnebago, Boone, and DeKalb counties.

He was previously the State Representative for the 89th District from 2018 to 2023.

After winning the 2018 general election, Chesney was appointed to succeed Brian W. Stewart for the remainder of the 100th General Assembly. Chesney was sworn into office December 5, 2018.

Chesney is a member of the Illinois Freedom Caucus and was the first State Senator to join the Caucus.

He is also the Chairman of the Stephenson County Republican Central Committee. Prior to his election to the Illinois House of Representatives he was an Alderman-at-large in the City of Freeport, a member of the Stephenson County Convention and Visitors Bureau and a member of the Illinois WorkNet Center for Stephenson, Jo Daviess, and Winnebago counties.

== Illinois Senate ==
=== Positions ===
Chesney is anti-abortion. He received a 100% rating from Illinois Right to Life Action and is 100% pro-life. He has voted against using public funding for abortions.

Chesney is pro-Second Amendment, receiving a 92% rating from the National Rifle Association (NRA).

=== Votes ===
==== Police and prison policy ====
- Voted against abolishing cash bail (HB3653)
- Sponsored legislation to reinstate the death penalty for first-degree murder (SB2145)

==== Firearms ====
- Voted against a statewide assault weapons ban (HB5471)
- Voted against Red Flag Laws (HB1092)
- Sponsored legislation to repeal the Firearms Owner's Identification Card (SB2136)

==== Immigration ====
- Sponsored legislation urging the U.S. Congress to impeach DHS Secretary Mayorkas (SR746)
- Voted against allowing DACA recipients to become police officers (HB3751)

==== Election integrity and government ====
- Voted for term limits for leadership positions in the General Assembly (HB642)
- Voted against extending ballot drop boxes and curbside voting (HB1871)

=== Committee assignments ===
As of January 2023, Senator Chesney is a member of the following Illinois Senate committees:

- Agriculture
- Approp- Pub Safety & Infrastructure
- Environment and Conservation
- Financial Institutions
- Labor
- Public Health

== Electoral history ==
Freeport, Illinois At-Large Alderman General Election, 2015
Party	Candidate	Votes	%
PEO	Andrew Chesney	2,914	100.0
Total votes		2,914	100.0

Illinois 89th State House District Republican Primary, 2018
Party	Candidate	Votes	%
Republican	Andrew S. Chesney	7,327	53.54
Republican	Steven R. Fricke	6,357	46.46
Total votes		13,684	100.0

Illinois 89th State House District General Election, 2018
Party	Candidate	Votes	%
Republican	Andrew S. Chesney	25,485	61.84
Democratic	Nicholas P. Hyde	15,725	38.16
Total votes		41,210	100.0

Illinois 89th State House District General Election, 2020
Party	Candidate	Votes	%
Republican	Andrew S. Chesney	38,341	73.4
Independent	John Cook	13,864	26.6
Total votes		52,205	100.0

2022 Illinois State Senate District 45 General Election
Party	Candidate	Votes	%
Republican	Andrew S. Chesney	55,738	66.6
Democratic	Gerald Podraza	27,891	33.4
Total votes		83,629	100.0
