= Christopher Belt =

American politician

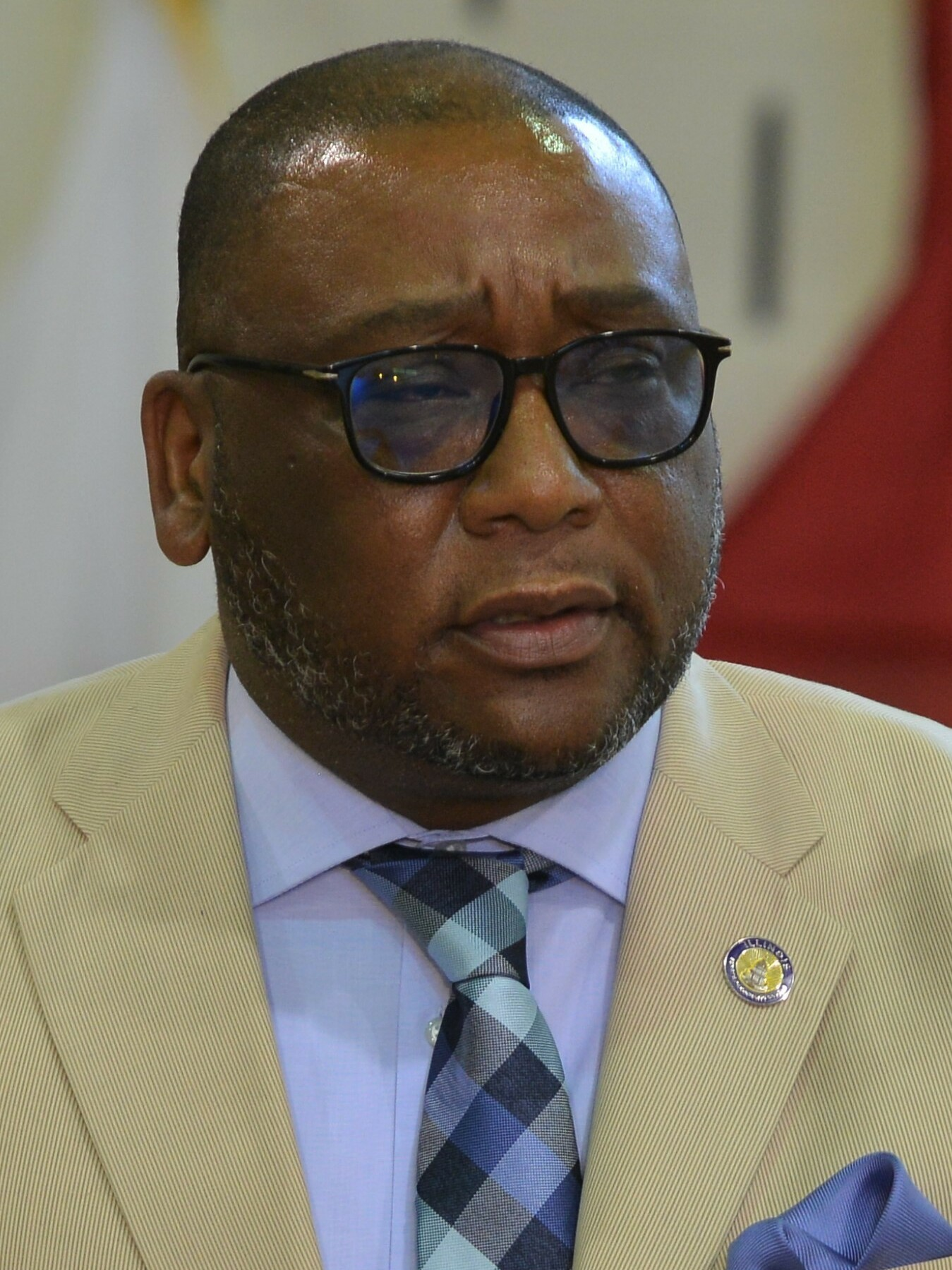

Member of the Illinois Senate from the 57th district
- Incumbent
- Assumed office January 4, 2019
- Preceded by: James Clayborne Jr.

Personal details
- Party: Democratic
- Education: Illinois State University (BA); Southern Illinois University Edwardsville (MPA); Lindenwood University-Belleville (MA)
- Profession: law enforcement officer

Christopher Belt is a Democratic member of the Illinois Senate for the 57th district. The 57th District, located in the Metro East region includes all or parts of Freeburg, Belleville, East St. Louis, O'Fallon, Madison, Fairview Heights, Shiloh, and Scott Air Force Base.

Belt was previously the President of the Board of Education for Cahokia Unit School District 187.

As of July 2022, Senator Belt is a member of the following Illinois Senate committees:

- (Chairman of) Appropriations - Education Committee (SAPP-SAED)
- Criminal Law Committee (SCCL)
- (Chairman of) Education Committee (SESE)
- Energy and Public Utilities Committee (SENE)
- Insurance Committee (SINS)
- (Chairman of) Insurance Mandates Committee (SINS-INMD)
- Labor Committee (SLAB)
- Licensed Activities Committee (SLIC)
- (Chairman of) Licensed Activities - Special Issues Committee (SLIC-SLSI)
- Redistricting - Southern Illinois Committee (SRED-SRSI)
- (Chairman of) Redistricting - Southwestern Illinois Committee (SRED-SRSW)
- Transportation Committee (STRN)
