= Neil Anderson (Illinois politician) =

American politician

Member of the Illinois Senate from the 47th district
- Incumbent
- Assumed office January 8, 2015
- Preceded by: Mike Jacobs

Personal details
- Born: April 14, 1982 (age 44) Norfolk, Nebraska, US
- Party: Republican
- Spouse: Brandi
- Children: 2
- Education: University of Nebraska–Lincoln
- Profession: Firefighter-Paramedic

Neil Anderson (born April 14, 1982) is an American Republican politician who currently represents the 47th district in the Illinois Senate. He assumed this district after his win in the November 2022 election. Previously, he defeated incumbent Democrat Mike Jacobs in the November 2014 election to represent the 36th district, located in Western Illinois. Western Illinois includes all or parts of East Moline, Moline, Rock Island, Rock Falls and Sterling.

Anderson defeated incumbent Democratic State Senator Mike Jacobs in the 2014 general election, 55%-45%.

Anderson works as a firefighter/paramedic for the Moline Fire Department and has a wife and two children.

Anderson ran for state representative in 2012 in the 72nd district. He lost to incumbent representative Patrick J. Verschoore by a margin of 64%-35%.

Anderson currently serves on the following committees: Licensed Activities (Minority Spokesperson); Public Safety (Minority Spokesperson); Commerce; Criminal Law; Energy and Public Utilities; Transportation; Redistricting- Northern Illinois; Criminal Law- Clear Compliance.

== Electoral history ==
2022 General Election for Illinois State Senate District 47
Party	Candidate	Votes	%
Republican	Neil Anderson	70,738	100.0
Total votes		70,738	100.0

2018 General Election for Illinois State Senate District 36
Party	Candidate	Votes	%
Republican	Neil Anderson	38,728	50.8
Democratic	Gregg Johnson	37,447	49.2
Total votes		76,175	100.0

2014 General Election for Illinois State Senate District 36
Party	Candidate	Votes	%
Republican	Neil Anderson	35,895	54.3
Democratic	Mike Jacobs	30,242	45.7
Total votes		66,137	100.0

2012 General Election for Illinois House of Representatives District 72
Party	Candidate	Votes	%
Democratic	Patrick J. Verschoore	28,675	64.3%
Republican	Neil Anderson	15,934	35.7%
Total votes		44,609	100.0
