= Illinois Senate =

Upper chamber of the Illinois General Assembly

- Illinois General Assembly

Type
- Type: Upper house
- Term limits: None

History
- New session started: January 8, 2025

Leadership
- President: Don Harmon (D) since January 19, 2020
- President pro tempore: Bill Cunningham (D) since January 30, 2020
- Majority Leader: Kimberly Lightford (D) since January 7, 2019
- Minority Leader: John Curran (R) since January 11, 2023

Structure
- Seats: 59
- Political groups: Majority: Democratic (40); Minority: Republican (19)
- Length of term: 4 years (with one two-year term each decade)
- Authority: Illinois Constitution Article IV
- Salary: $93,712/year + per diem

Elections
- Last election: November 5, 2024
- Next election: November 3, 2026
- Redistricting: Legislative Control

Meeting place
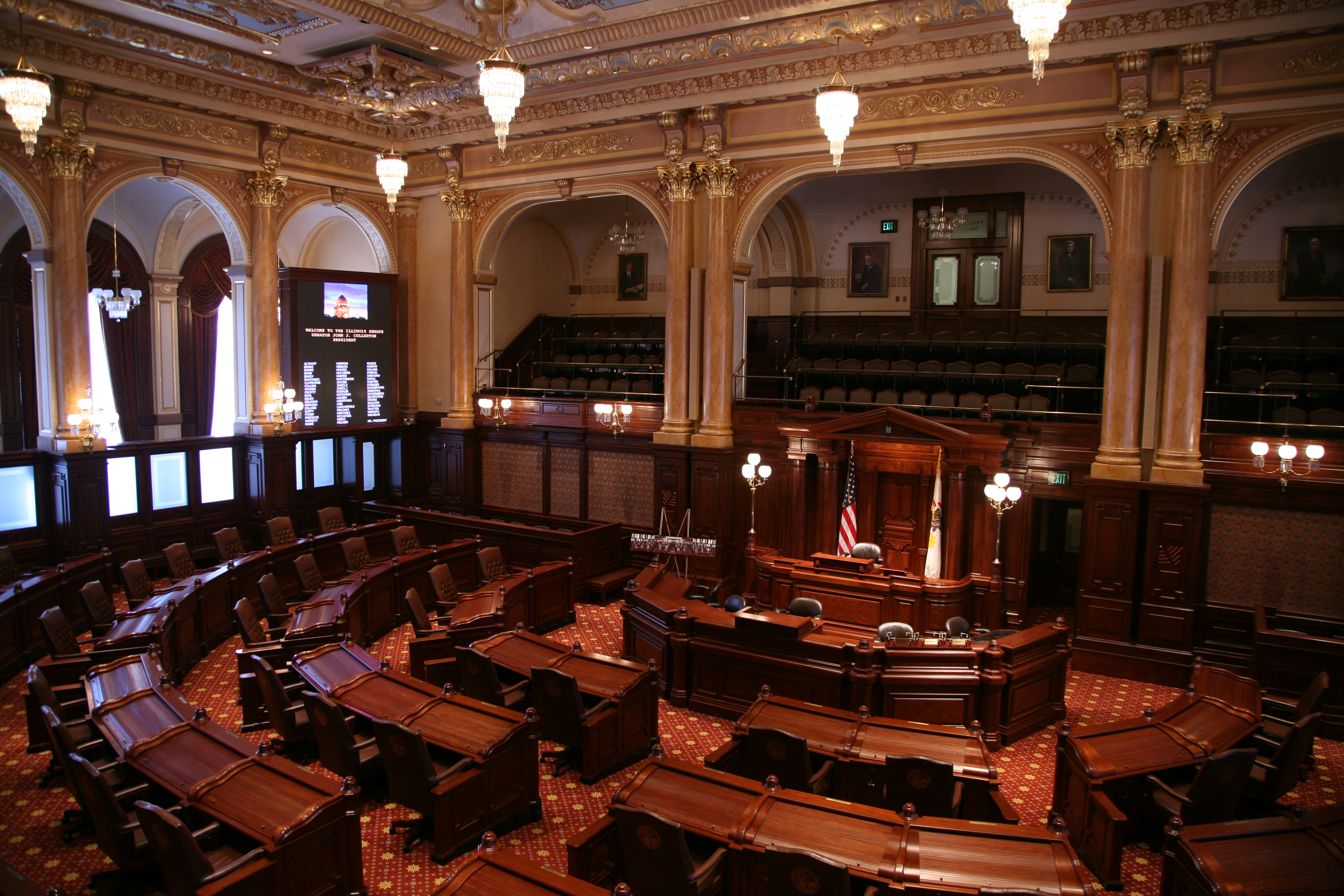
- State Senate Chamber; Illinois State Capitol; Springfield, Illinois

Website
- ilga.gov/senate

Rules
- Rules of the Senate of the 103rd General Assembly

The Illinois Senate is the upper chamber of the Illinois General Assembly, the legislative branch of the government of the State of Illinois in the United States. The body was created by the first state constitution adopted in 1818. Under the Illinois Constitution of 1970, the Illinois Senate is made up of 59 senators elected from individual legislative districts determined by population and redistricted every 10 years; based on the 2020 U.S. census each senator represents approximately 213,347 people. Senate districts are divided into three groups, each group having a two-year term at a different part of the decade between censuses, with the rest of the decade being taken up by two four-year terms. For example, group one elects senators for terms of four years, four years and two years, group two elects senators for terms of four years, two years and four years, and group three elects senators for terms of two years, four years and four years. This ensures that the Senate reflects changes made when the General Assembly redistricts itself after each census.

Usually, depending on the election year, roughly one-third or two-thirds of Senate seats are contested. On rare occasions (usually after a census), all Senate seats are up for election. In contrast, the Illinois House of Representatives is made up of 118 members with its entire membership elected to two-year terms. House districts are formed by dividing each Senate district in half, with each senator having two "associated" representatives.

The Illinois Senate convenes at the Illinois State Capitol in Springfield, Illinois. Its first official working day is the second Wednesday of January each year. Its primary duties are to pass bills into law, approve the state budget, confirm appointments to state departments and agencies, act on federal constitutional amendments and propose constitutional amendments for Illinois. It also has the power to override gubernatorial vetoes through a three-fifths majority vote. The Illinois Senate tries impeachments made by the House of Representatives, and can convict impeached officers by a two-thirds vote.

Voting in the Illinois Senate is done by members pushing one of three buttons. Unlike most states, the Illinois Senate allows members to vote yes, no, or present. It takes 30 affirmative votes to pass legislation during final action. The number of negative votes does not matter. Therefore, voting present has the same effect on the tally as voting no. Barack Obama began his political career in the Illinois Senate before going on to become President of the United States.

== Party summary ==
Affiliation	Party (Shading indicates majority caucus)		Total	Vacant
Affiliation	Democratic	Republican	Total	Vacant
End of previous legislature	40	19	59	0
January 8, 2025	40	19	59	0
February 2, 2025 (Note: Republican Dan McConchie resigned.)	40	18	58	1
February 28, 2025 (Note: Republican Darby Hills was appointed to replace McConchie.)	40	19	59	0
Latest voting share	67.8%	32.2%		

== Leadership ==
As of February 28, 2025, the 104th General Assembly of the Illinois Senate consists of the following leadership:

=== Majority ===
- President of the Senate: Don Harmon
- Majority Leader: Kimberly A. Lightford
- President Pro Tempore: Bill Cunningham
- Deputy Majority Leaders:
  - Laura Murphy
  - Emil Jones III
- Assistant Majority Leaders:
  - Mattie Hunter
  - David Koehler
  - Linda Holmes
  - Laura M. Murphy
  - Napoleon Harris III
- Majority Caucus Chair: Omar Aquino
- Majority Caucus Appropriations Leader: Elgie Sims
- Majority Caucus Whips:
  - Julie Morrison
  - Cristina Castro
  - Ram Villivalam
  - Robert Peters

=== Minority ===
- Minority Leader: John Curran
- Deputy Minority Leader: Sue Rezin
- Assistant Minority Leaders:
  - Dale Fowler
  - Steve McClure
  - Terri Bryant
  - Sally Turner
- Minority Caucus Chair: Jason Plummer
- Minority Caucus Whips:
  - Jil Tracy
  - Chapin Rose

== Officers ==
As of February 28, 2025:

- Secretary of the Senate: Tim Anderson
- Assistant Secretary of the Senate: Scott Kaiser
- Sergeant-at-Arms: Joe Dominguez
- Assistant Sergeant-at-Arms: Dirk R. Eilers

== Members ==
In 1924, Florence Fifer Bohrer became the body's first female member and Adelbert H. Roberts became its first African American member. In 1977, Earlean Collins became the first African American woman to serve in the Illinois Senate. Barack Obama, later the first African-American President of the United States, served in the Illinois Senate from 1997 to 2004.

As of September 9, 2026, the 104th General Assembly of the Illinois Senate consists of the following members:

District	Name	Party	Residence	Start	Next Election
1	Javier Cervantes (Note: Appointed after being elected, but prior to inauguration day of the General Assembly to which they were elected.)	Democratic	Chicago	November 18, 2022	2028
2	Omar Aquino (Note: Appointed prior to their initial election.)	Democratic	Chicago	July 1, 2016	2026
3	Mattie Hunter	Democratic	Chicago	January 8, 2003	2026
4	Kimberly Lightford	Democratic	Chicago	November 20, 1998	2028
5	Lakesia Collins	Democratic	Chicago	August 16, 2023	2026
6	Sara Feigenholtz	Democratic	Chicago	January 21, 2020	2026
7	Mike Simmons	Democratic	Chicago	February 6, 2021	2028
8	Ram Villivalam	Democratic	Chicago	January 5, 2019	2026
9	Laura Fine	Democratic	Glenview	January 6, 2019	2026
10	Robert Martwick	Democratic	Chicago	June 28, 2019	2028
11	Mike Porfirio	Democratic	Bridgeview	January 11, 2023	2026
12	Celina Villanueva	Democratic	Chicago	January 7, 2020	2026
13	Robert Peters	Democratic	Chicago	January 6, 2019	2028
14	Emil Jones III	Democratic	Chicago	January 14, 2009	2026
15	Napoleon Harris	Democratic	Harvey	January 9, 2013	2026
16	Willie Preston	Democratic	Chicago	January 11, 2023	2028
17	Elgie Sims	Democratic	Chicago	January 26, 2018	2026
18	William Cunningham	Democratic	Chicago	January 9, 2013	2026
19	Michael Hastings	Democratic	Tinley Park	January 9, 2013	2028
20	Graciela Guzmán	Democratic	Chicago	January 8, 2025	2026
21	Laura Ellman	Democratic	Lisle	January 9, 2019	2026
22	Cristina Castro	Democratic	Elgin	January 11, 2017	2028
23	Suzy Glowiak	Democratic	Western Springs	January 9, 2019	2026
24	Seth Lewis	Republican	Bartlett	January 11, 2023	2026
25	Karina Villa	Democratic	West Chicago	January 13, 2021	2028
26	Darby Hills	Republican	Barrington Hills	February 28, 2025	2026
27	Mark L. Walker	Democratic	Arlington Heights	May 11, 2024	2026
28	Laura Murphy	Democratic	Des Plaines	October 5, 2015	2028
29	Julie Morrison	Democratic	Deerfield	January 9, 2013	2026
30	Adriane Johnson	Democratic	Buffalo Grove	October 11, 2020	2026
31	Mary Edly-Allen	Democratic	Libertyville	January 11, 2023	2028
32	Craig Wilcox	Republican	McHenry	October 1, 2018	2026
33	Don DeWitte	Republican	St. Charles	January 9, 2019	2026
34	Steve Stadelman	Democratic	Rockford	January 9, 2013	2028
35	Dave Syverson	Republican	Rockford	January 13, 1993	2026
36	Michael Halpin	Democratic	Rock Island	January 11, 2023	2026
37	Li Arellano Jr.	Republican	Dixon	January 8, 2025	2028
38	Sue Rezin	Republican	Morris	December 11, 2010	2026
39	Don Harmon	Democratic	Oak Park	January 8, 2003	2026
40	Patrick Joyce	Democratic	Kankakee	November 8, 2019	2028
41	John Curran	Republican	Woodridge	July 23, 2017	2026
42	Linda Holmes	Democratic	Aurora	January 10, 2007	2026
43	Rachel Ventura	Democratic	Joliet	January 11, 2023	2028
44	Sally Turner	Republican	Beason	January 25, 2021	2026
45	Andrew Chesney	Republican	Freeport	December 5, 2018	2026
46	Dave Koehler	Democratic	Peoria	December 3, 2006	2028
47	Neil Anderson	Republican	Andalusia	January 15, 2015	2026
48	Doris Turner	Democratic	Springfield	February 6, 2021	2026
49	Meg Loughran Cappel	Democratic	Shorewood	December 10, 2020	2028
50	Jil Tracy	Republican	Quincy	January 11, 2017	2026
51	Chapin Rose	Republican	Mahomet	January 9, 2013	2026
52	Paul Faraci	Democratic	Champaign	January 11, 2023	2028
53	Chris Balkema	Republican	Channahon	January 8, 2025	2026
54	Steve McClure	Republican	Springfield	January 9, 2019	2026
55	Jason Plummer	Republican	Edwardsville	January 9, 2019	2028
56	Erica Harriss	Republican	Glen Carbon	January 11, 2023	2026
57	Christopher Belt	Democratic	Cahokia Heights	January 9, 2019	2026
58	Terri Bryant	Republican	Murphysboro	January 13, 2021	2028
59	Paul Jacobs	Republican	Pomona	June 17, 2026	2026

== Future election terms by district ==
State senators will be elected in the legislative districts for terms of office as set forth below.

First group (Districts 2, 5, 8, 11, 14, 17, 20, 23, 26, 29, 32, 35, 38, 41, 44, 47, 50, 53, 56, 59)

2026 - 4 Years

2030 - 2 Years

Second group (Districts 3, 6, 9, 12, 15, 18, 21, 24, 27, 30, 33, 36, 39, 42, 45, 48, 51, 54, 57)

2026 - 2 Years

2028 - 4 Years

Third group (Districts 1, 4, 7, 10, 13, 16, 19, 22, 25, 28, 31, 34, 37, 40, 43, 46, 49, 52, 55, 58)

2028 - 4 Years
