= 99th Illinois General Assembly =

2015 to 2016 legislative session

←	98th	100th	→
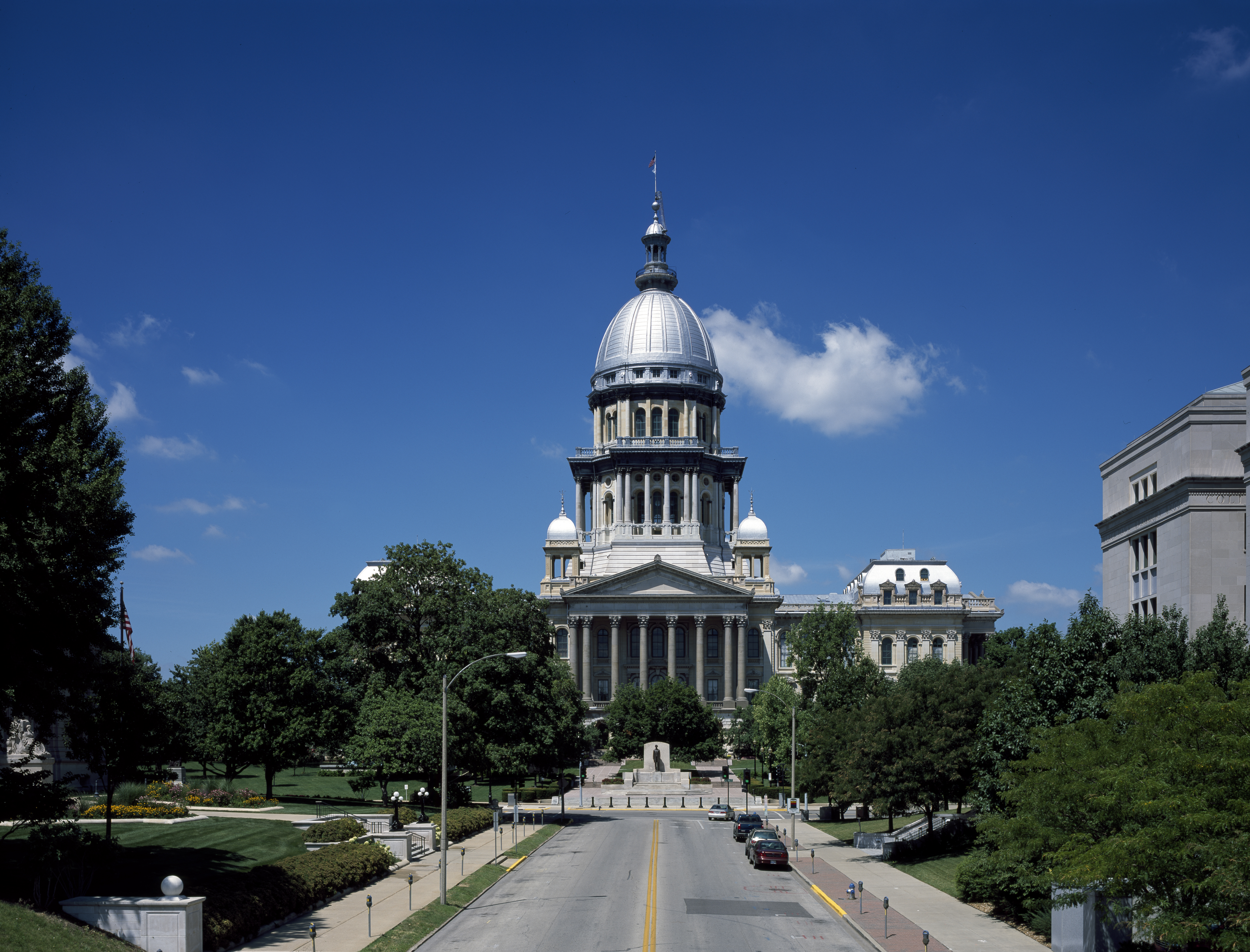
- The Illinois State Capitol in 2016

Overview
- Meeting place: Springfield, Illinois
- Term: 2015 – 2016
- Election: 2014
- Website: Official site

Illinois Senate
- President: John J. Cullerton, Democrat

Illinois House of Representatives
- Speaker: Michael J. Madigan, Democrat

The 99th Illinois General Assembly convened on January 14, 2015, and adjourned sine die on January 10, 2017.

== Legislation ==
A total of 938 bills became law in the course of the 99th General Assembly. Among these was a major overhaul of Illinois' family law statutes, as a result of which no-fault divorce became available in Illinois and heartbalm torts were abolished. The General Assembly also passed the nation's first law punishing companies for participating in the Boycott, Divestment and Sanctions movement.

The Illinois Budget Impasse, which caused the state to go more than two years without a budget, began on July 1, 2015 and continued into the 100th General Assembly in 2017.

== Senate ==
2014 Illinois Senate election results

Of the Senate's 59 members, 19 stood for election in the 2014 Illinois Senate election. One district, the 36th, changed hands from the Democratic to the Republican Party.

=== Senate leadership ===
Position	Name	Party	District
President of the Senate	John J. Cullerton	Democratic	6
Majority Leader	James Clayborne	Democratic	57
Minority Leader	Christine Radogno	Republican	41

=== Party composition ===
The Senate of the 99th General Assembly consisted of 20 Republicans and 39 Democrats.

Affiliation	Members
Democratic Party	39
Republican Party	20
Total	59

=== State senators ===
District	Counties represented	Senator	Party	First year	Committees
1	Cook	Antonio Muñoz	Democratic	1999	Member: Energy and Public Utilities, Executive, Executive Appointments (chair), Insurance
2	Cook	William Delgado	Democratic	1999	
2	Cook	Omar Aquino	Democratic	2016	Member: Appropriations I, Education, Human Services
3	Cook	Mattie Hunter	Democratic	2003	Member: Appropriations I, Energy and Public Utilities (chair), Executive, Human Services, Public Health
4	Cook	Kimberly A. Lightford	Democratic	1998	Member: Assignments, Com. Oversight Medicaid Mang. Care, Education (chair), Energy and Public Utilities, Executive, Executive Appointments, Labor
5	Cook	Patricia Van Pelt	Democratic	2013	Member: Appropriations I, Commerce and Economic Development, Criminal Law, Energy and Public Utilities, Public Health
6	Cook	John J. Cullerton	Democratic	1979	Member: Executive
7	Cook	Heather A. Steans	Democratic	2008	Member: Appropriations I (chair), Appropriations II, Com. Oversight Medicaid Mang. Care (chair), Environment and Conservation, Executive, Human Services
8	Cook	Ira I. Silverstein	Democratic	1999	Member: Executive, Executive Appointments, Financial Institutions, Insurance, Judiciary
9	Cook	Daniel Biss	Democratic	2011	Member: Appropriations I, Com. Oversight Medicaid Mang. Care, Education, Financial Institutions, Human Services (chair), Revenue
10	Cook	John G. Mulroe	Democratic	2010	Member: Com. Oversight Medicaid Mang. Care, Commerce and Economic Development, Criminal Law, Energy and Public Utilities, Insurance, Judiciary, Public Health (chair)
11	Cook	Martin A. Sandoval	Democratic	2003	Member: Energy and Public Utilities, Licensed Activities and Pensions, Local Government, Transportation (chair)
12	Cook	Steven M. Landek	Democratic	2011	Member: Appropriations II, Local Government, Revenue, State Government & Veterans Affairs (chair)
13	Cook	Kwame Raoul	Democratic	2004	Member: Pension Investments (chair), Restorative Justice (chair), Criminal Law, Energy and Public Utilities, Executive, Judiciary (chair), Public Health
14	Cook	Emil Jones III	Democratic	2009	Member: Financial Institutions, Licensed Activities and Pensions, Local Government (chair), Revenue, Transportation
15	Cook, Will	Napoleon Harris III	Democratic	2013	Member: Commerce and Economic Development, Insurance, Licensed Activities and Pensions, Public Health, Transportation
16	Cook	Jacqueline Y. Collins	Democratic	2003	Member: Commerce and Economic Development, Financial Institutions (chair), Higher Education, Insurance, Public Health, Transportation
17	Cook, Kankakee, Will	Donne E. Trotter	Democratic	1988	Member: Appropriations I, Appropriations II (chair), Com. Oversight Medicaid Mang. Care, Energy and Public Utilities, Executive
18	Cook	Bill Cunningham	Democratic	2011	Member: Agriculture (chair), Appropriations II, Criminal Law, Higher Education, Labor, Transportation
19	Cook, Will	Michael E. Hastings	Democratic	2013	Member: Appropriations I, Appropriations II, Financial Institutions, Insurance, Judiciary, State Government & Veterans Affairs
20	Cook	Iris Y. Martinez	Democratic	2003	Member: Commerce and Economic Development, Pension Investments, Education, Energy and Public Utilities, Labor, Licensed Activities and Pensions (chair), Transportation
21	DuPage, Will	Michael Connelly	Republican	2009	Member: Commerce and Economic Development, Restorative Justice (chair), Criminal Law, Judiciary, Labor, Licensed Activities and Pensions
22	Cook, Kane	Michael Noland	Democratic	2007	Member: Restorative Justice, Criminal Law (chair), Education, Energy and Public Utilities, Judiciary, Revenue
23	Cook, DuPage, DuPage	Thomas Cullerton	Democratic	2013	Member: Appropriations II, Energy and Public Utilities, Labor, Local Government, State Government & Veterans Affairs, Transportation
24	Cook, DuPage	Chris Nybo	Republican	2011	Member: Com. Oversight Medicaid Mang. Care, Criminal Law, Energy and Public Utilities, Executive, Financial Institutions, Judiciary, Revenue, Transportation
25	Cook, DuPage, Kane, Kendall	Jim Oberweis	Republican	2013	Member: Appropriations II, Labor, Local Government, State Government & Veterans Affairs, Transportation
26	Cook, Kane, Lake, McHenry	Dan Duffy	Republican	2009	
26	Cook, Kane, Lake, McHenry	Dan McConchie	Republican	2016	Member: Appropriations I, Commerce and Economic Development, Pension Investments, Labor, State Government & Veterans Affairs
27	Cook	Matt Murphy	Republican	2007	
27	Cook	Tom Rooney	Republican	2016	Member: Appropriations II, Com. Oversight Medicaid Mang. Care, Higher Education, Insurance, Public Health
28	Cook, DuPage	Dan Kotowski	Democratic	2007	
28	Cook, DuPage	Laura M. Murphy	Democratic	2015	Member: Appropriations I, Appropriations II, Criminal Law, Higher Education, Revenue
29	Cook, Lake	Julie A. Morrison	Democratic	2013	Member: Commerce and Economic Development, Education, Environment and Conservation, Human Services, Transportation
30	Cook, Lake	Terry Link	Democratic	1997	Member: Energy and Public Utilities, Executive, Financial Institutions, Insurance
31	Lake	Melinda Bush	Democratic	2013	Member: Commerce and Economic Development, Education, Environment and Conservation, Human Services, Revenue, State Government & Veterans Affairs
32	Lake, McHenry	Pamela J. Althoff	Republican	2003	Member: Appropriations II, Assignments, Com. Oversight Medicaid Mang. Care, Executive Appointments, Labor, Licensed Activities and Pensions, Revenue, Transportation
33	Kane, McHenry	Karen McConnaughay	Republican	2013	Member: Pension Investments, Restorative Justice, Education, Energy and Public Utilities, Financial Institutions, Revenue, Transportation
34	Winnebago	Steve Stadelman	Democratic	2013	Member: Appropriations I, Commerce and Economic Development, Education, Higher Education, Transportation
35	Boone, DeKalb, Kane, Winnebago	Dave Syverson	Republican	1993	Member: Com. Oversight Medicaid Mang. Care, Energy and Public Utilities, Executive, Human Services, Insurance, Public Health
36	Carroll, Henry, Rock Island, Whiteside	Neil Anderson	Republican	2015	Member: Agriculture, Energy and Public Utilities, Higher Education, Local Government, Transportation
37	Bureau, Henry, Knox, LaSalle, Lee, Marshall, Mercer, Peoria, Stark, Woodford	Darin M. LaHood	Republican	2011	
37	Bureau, Henry, Knox, LaSalle, Lee, Marshall, Mercer, Peoria, Stark, Woodford	Chuck Weaver	Republican	2015	Member: Commerce and Economic Development, Criminal Law, Energy and Public Utilities, Insurance, Judiciary, Licensed Activities and Pensions
38	Bureau, Grundy, Kendall, LaSalle, Livingston, Putnam, Will	Sue Rezin	Republican	2010	Member: Appropriations II, Pension Investments (chair), Education, Energy and Public Utilities, Executive, Financial Institutions, Transportation
39	Cook, DuPage	Don Harmon	Democratic	2003	Member: Assignments, Executive (chair), Judiciary
40	Cook, Grundy, Kankakee, Will	Toi W. Hutchinson	Democratic	2009	Member: Appropriations II, Pension Investments, Restorative Justice, Judiciary, Labor, Licensed Activities and Pensions, Revenue (chair), Transportation
41	Cook, DuPage, DuPage, Will	Christine Radogno	Republican	1997	Member: Executive
42	DuPage, Kane, Kendall, Will	Linda Holmes	Democratic	2007	Member: Agriculture, Commerce and Economic Development (chair), Environment and Conservation, Insurance, Labor, Local Government
43	DuPage, Will	Pat McGuire	Democratic	2012	Member: Appropriations II, Environment and Conservation, Higher Education (chair), Revenue, State Government & Veterans Affairs, Transportation
44	Logan, McLean, Menard, Sangamon, Tazewell	William E. Brady	Republican	1993	Member: Com. Oversight Medicaid Mang. Care, Commerce and Economic Development, Energy and Public Utilities, Executive, Insurance, Transportation
45	Carroll, DeKalb, Jo Daviess, LaSalle, Lee, Ogle, Stephenson, Whiteside, Winnebago	Tim Bivins	Republican	2008	Member: Appropriations I, Pension Investments, Restorative Justice, Environment and Conservation, Human Services, Insurance, Local Government
46	Fulton, Peoria, Tazewell	David Koehler	Democratic	2006	Member: Agriculture, Com. Oversight Medicaid Mang. Care, Environment and Conservation (chair), Labor, Local Government, Transportation
47	Adams, Brown, Cass, Fulton, Hancock, Henderson, Knox, Mason, McDonough, Schuyler, Warren	John M. Sullivan	Democratic	2003	Member: Agriculture, Environment and Conservation, Financial Institutions, Higher Education, State Government & Veterans Affairs, Transportation
48	Christian, Macon, Macoupin, Madison, Montgomery, Sangamon	Andy Manar	Democratic	2013	Member: Agriculture, Appropriations I, Appropriations II, Com. Oversight Medicaid Mang. Care, Education, Executive Appointments, Higher Education, Labor
49	Kendall, Will	Jennifer Bertino-Tarrant	Democratic	2013	Member: Appropriations II, Education, Labor, Licensed Activities and Pensions, Local Government, Transportation
50	Calhoun, Greene, Jersey, Macoupin, Madison, Morgan, Pike, Sangamon, Scott	Wm. Sam McCann	Republican	2011	Member: Agriculture, Environment and Conservation, Higher Education, Local Government, Public Health
51	Champaign, DeWitt, Douglas, Edgar, Macon, McLean, Moultrie, Piatt, Shelby, Vermilion	Chapin Rose	Republican	2003	Member: Appropriations I, Appropriations II, Restorative Justice, Education, Insurance
52	Champaign, Vermilion	Scott M. Bennett	Democratic	2015	Member: Agriculture, Appropriations II, Criminal Law, Environment and Conservation, Higher Education, Labor
53	Ford, Iroquois, Livingston, McLean, Vermilion, Woodford	Jason A. Barickman	Republican	2011	Member: Appropriations I, Commerce and Economic Development, Education, Judiciary, Licensed Activities and Pensions
54	Bond, Clinton, Effingham, Fayette, Madison, Marion, St. Clair, Washington	Kyle McCarter	Republican	2009	Member: Agriculture, Environment and Conservation, Higher Education, Labor, State Government & Veterans Affairs
55	Clark, Clay, Coles, Crawford, Cumberland, Edgar, Edwards, Effingham, Jasper, Lawrence, Richland, Wabash, Wayne, White	Dale A. Righter	Republican	1998	Member: Appropriations I, Appropriations II, Assignments, Criminal Law, Environment and Conservation, Executive Appointments, Human Services, Revenue
56	Jersey, Madison, St. Clair	William R. Haine	Democratic	2002	Member: Restorative Justice, Criminal Law, Insurance (chair), Judiciary, Licensed Activities and Pensions
57	Madison, St. Clair	James F. Clayborne Jr.	Democratic	1995	Member: Assignments (chair), Pension Investments, Energy and Public Utilities, Executive, Insurance
58	Jackson, Jefferson, Monroe, Perry, Randolph, St. Clair, Union, Washington	David S. Luechtefeld	Republican	1995	Member: Agriculture, Education, Executive, Financial Institutions
59	Alexander, Franklin, Gallatin, Hamilton, Hardin, Jackson, Johnson, Massac, Pope, Pulaski, Saline, Union, Williamson	Gary Forby	Democratic	2001	Member: Energy and Public Utilities, Insurance, Labor (chair), Licensed Activities and Pensions

== House ==
=== Party composition ===
The House of the 99th General Assembly consisted of 47 Republicans and 71 Democrats.

Affiliation	Members
Democratic Party	71
Republican Party	47
Total	118

=== House leadership ===
Position	Name	Party	District
Speaker of the House	Michael J. Madigan	Democratic	22
Majority Leader	Barbara Flynn Currie	Democratic	25
Minority Leader	Jim Durkin	Republican	82

=== State representatives ===
District	Counties represented	Representative	Party	First year	Committees
1	Cook	Daniel J. Burke	Democratic	1991	Member: Elem Sec Ed Charter School Policy, Executive (chair), Financial Institutions
2	Cook	Edward J. Acevedo	Democratic	1997	Member: Appropriations-Elementary & Secondary Educ, Appropriations-Human Services, Executive, Health & Healthcare Disparities
3	Cook	Luis Arroyo	Democratic	2006	Member: Appropriations-Public Safety (chair), Executive, House Budget Oversight Panel, Labor & Commerce, Public Utilities, Tollway Oversight, Veterans' Affairs
4	Cook	Cynthia Soto	Democratic	2001	Member: Appropriations-Elementary & Secondary Educ, Appropriations-Higher Education, Financial Institutions (chair), Health & Healthcare Disparities, Human Services
5	Cook	Kenneth Dunkin	Democratic	2002	Member: Appropriations-Higher Education (chair), Appropriations-Public Safety, Elem Sec Ed School Curricu Policies, Financial Institutions, Health & Healthcare Disparities, House Budget Oversight Panel, Insurance, Tourism & Conventions (chair)
6	Cook	Esther Golar	Democratic	2005	
6	Cook	Sonya M. Harper	Democratic	2015	Member: Economic Development & Housing, Elem Sec Ed School Curricu Policies, Environment, Renewable Energy & Sustainability, Restorative Justice
7	Cook	Emanuel Chris Welch	Democratic	2013	Member: Appropriations-Elementary & Secondary Educ, Appropriations-Higher Education, Elem Sec Ed School Curricu Policies, Higher Education, Judiciary - Criminal, Labor & Commerce, Public Private Partnerships, Substance Abuse Special
8	Cook	La Shawn K. Ford	Democratic	2007	Member: Appropriations-General Service, Appropriations-Human Services, Economic Development & Housing, Health Care Availability Access, International Trade & Commerce, Restorative Justice (chair), Sm Bus Empowerment Wkforce Develop (chair), Tourism & Conventions, Veterans' Affairs
9	Cook	Arthur Turner	Democratic	2010	Member: Economic Development & Housing, Executive, Insurance, Judiciary - Criminal, Juvenile Justice & System-Involved, Revenue & Finance, Rules
10	Cook	Melissa Conyears	Democratic	2017	
10	Cook	Pamela Reaves-Harris	Democratic	2015	
11	Cook	Ann M. Williams	Democratic	2011	Member: Adoption Reform, Insurance, Judiciary - Civil, Labor & Commerce, Renewable Energy & Sustainability (chair)
12	Cook	Sara Feigenholtz	Democratic	1995	Member: Adoption Reform (chair), Appropriations-Human Services, Insurance, Special Needs Services, Tourism & Conventions
13	Cook	Gregory Harris	Democratic	2006	Member: Appropriations-Human Services (chair), Executive, House Budget Oversight Panel, Insurance, Restorative Justice, Tourism & Conventions
14	Cook	Kelly M. Cassidy	Democratic	2011	Member: Appropriations-Public Safety, Community College Access & Afford., Human Services, Judiciary - Criminal, Juvenile Justice & System-Involved (chair), Labor & Commerce, Renewable Energy & Sustainability, Restorative Justice
15	Cook	John C. D'Amico	Democratic	2004	Member: Consumer Protection, Labor & Commerce, Transportation, Regulation, Roads, Transportation: Vehicles & Safety (chair), Veterans' Affairs
16	Cook	Lou Lang	Democratic	1987	Member: Public Private Partnerships (chair), Revenue & Finance, Rules, Substance Abuse Special (chair)
17	Cook	Laura Fine	Democratic	2013	Member: Appropriations-Higher Education, Environment, Higher Education, Human Services, Insurance, Youth & Young Adults (chair)
18	Cook	Robyn Gabel	Democratic	2010	Member: Appropriations-Human Services, Environment, Human Services (chair), Insurance, Juvenile Justice & System-Involved, Museums, Arts, & Cultural Enhanceme, Renewable Energy & Sustainability, Sm Bus Empowerment Wkforce Develop, Youth & Young Adults
19	Cook	Robert Martwick	Democratic	2013	Member: Appropriations-General Service, Economic Development & Housing, Elem Sec Ed Charter School Policy, Financial Institutions, Insurance, Judiciary - Civil, Museums, Arts, & Cultural Enhanceme, Renewable Energy & Sustainability, Veterans' Affairs
20	Cook	Michael P. McAuliffe	Republican	1996	Member: Appropriations-Public Safety, Health Care Availability Access, Health Care Licenses, Museums, Arts, & Cultural Enhanceme, Public Utilities, Substance Abuse Special, Tourism & Conventions, Veterans' Affairs
21	Cook	Silvana Tabares	Democratic	2013	Member: Financial Institutions, Labor & Commerce, Transportation, Regulation, Roads
22	Cook	Michael J. Madigan	Democratic	1971	
23	Cook	Michael J. Zalewski	Democratic	2008	Member: Health Care Licenses (chair), Insurance, Judiciary - Criminal, Personnel & Pensions, Revenue & Finance
24	Cook	Elizabeth Hernandez	Democratic	2007	Member: Appropriations-Elementary & Secondary Educ, Appropriations-Human Services, Consumer Protection (chair), Health & Healthcare Disparities, Higher Education, Labor & Commerce, Sm Bus Empowerment Wkforce Develop
25	Cook	Barbara Flynn Currie	Democratic	1979	Member: Elem Sec Ed: Licensing Oversight, House Budget Oversight Panel (chair), Judiciary - Criminal, Revenue & Finance (chair), Rules (chair)
26	Cook	Christian L. Mitchell	Democratic	2013	Member: Elem Sec Ed School Curricu Policies, Judiciary - Criminal, Juvenile Justice & System-Involved, Renewable Energy & Sustainability, Revenue & Finance, State Government Administration
27	Cook	Monique D. Davis	Democratic	1987	
27	Cook	Justin Slaughter	Democratic	2017	
28	Cook	Robert Rita	Democratic	2003	Member: Appropriations-Public Safety, Business Occupational Licenses (chair), Consumer Protection, Executive, Insurance, Revenue & Finance, Tollway Oversight (chair)
29	Cook, Will	Thaddeus Jones	Democratic	2011	Member: Appropriations-Higher Education, Appropriations-Public Safety, Community College Access & Afford. (chair), Labor & Commerce
30	Cook	William Davis	Democratic	2003	Member: Appropriations-Elementary & Secondary Educ (chair), Appropriations-Higher Education, Appropriations-Public Safety, Health & Healthcare Disparities (chair), House Budget Oversight Panel, International Trade & Commerce, Labor & Commerce, Public Private Partnerships
31	Cook	Mary E. Flowers	Democratic	1985	Member: Economic Development & Housing, Health & Healthcare Disparities, Health Care Availability Access (chair), Higher Education, Human Services, Juvenile Justice & System-Involved, Restorative Justice, Sm Bus Empowerment Wkforce Develop, Special Needs Services, Youth & Young Adults
32	Cook	André Thapedi	Democratic	2009	Member: Energy, Financial Institutions, International Trade & Commerce (chair), Judiciary - Civil, Public Utilities
33	Cook	Marcus C. Evans Jr.	Democratic	2012	Member: Agriculture & Conservation, Appropriations-General Service, Business Occupational Licenses, Economic Development & Housing (chair), Financial Institutions, Revenue & Finance
34	Cook, Kankakee, Will	Elgie R. Sims Jr.	Democratic	2012	Member: Business Occupational Licenses, Elem Sec Ed School Curricu Policies, Higher Education, Judiciary - Criminal (chair), Revenue & Finance, Transportation, Regulation, Roads
35	Cook	Frances Ann Hurley	Democratic	2013	Member: Appropriations-General Service, Business Growth & Incentives, Consumer Protection, Health Care Licenses, Labor & Commerce, Special Needs Services, Substance Abuse Special, Transportation, Regulation, Roads, Youth & Young Adults
36	Cook	Kelly M. Burke	Democratic	2011	Member: Agriculture & Conservation, Appropriations-Higher Education, Health Care Licenses, Higher Education (chair), Labor & Commerce, Museums, Arts, & Cultural Enhanceme, Tollway Oversight
37	Cook, Will	Margo McDermed	Republican	2015	Member: Appropriations-General Service, Business Growth & Incentives, Counties & Townships, Environment, Health Care Licenses, Intermodal Infrastructure, Juvenile Justice & System-Involved, Public Private Partnerships, State Government Administration
38	Cook, Will	Al Riley	Democratic	2007	Member: Appropriations-Elementary & Secondary Educ, Appropriations-Public Safety, Cities & Villages, Counties & Townships, Transportation: Vehicles & Safety
39	Cook	Will Guzzardi	Democratic	2015	Member: Economic Development & Housing, Elem Sec Ed School Curricu Policies, Energy, Environment, Juvenile Justice & System-Involved, Renewable Energy & Sustainability, Special Needs Services
40	Cook	Jaime M. Andrade Jr.	Democratic	2013	Member: Consumer Protection, Economic Development & Housing, Human Services, Intermodal Infrastructure, State Government Administration, Transportation, Regulation, Roads
41	DuPage, Will	Grant Wehrli	Republican	2015	Member: Appropriations-Higher Education, Business Growth & Incentives, Consumer Protection, Personnel & Pensions, Public Utilities, Sm Bus Empowerment Wkforce Develop, Special Needs Services
42	DuPage	Jeanne M Ives	Republican	2013	Member: Appropriations-Elementary & Secondary Educ, Business Growth & Incentives, Cities & Villages, Community College Access & Afford., Intermodal Infrastructure, Juvenile Justice & System-Involved, Labor & Commerce, Personnel & Pensions, Substance Abuse Special, Youth & Young Adults
43	Cook, Kane	Anna Moeller	Democratic	2014	Member: Adoption Reform, Agriculture & Conservation, Appropriations-General Service, Elem Sec Ed Charter School Policy, Environment, Health Care Licenses, Renewable Energy & Sustainability
44	Cook	Fred Crespo	Democratic	2007	Member: Appropriations-General Service (chair), Business Growth & Incentives, Community College Access & Afford., Elem Sec Ed School Curricu Policies (chair), Financial Institutions, House Budget Oversight Panel, Public Private Partnerships, Public Utilities, Special Needs Services
45	Cook, DuPage	Christine Winger	Republican	2015	Member: Appropriations-General Service, Financial Institutions, Insurance, Renewable Energy & Sustainability, Sm Bus Empowerment Wkforce Develop, Substance Abuse Special, Veterans' Affairs
46	DuPage	Deb Conroy	Democratic	2013	Member: Counties & Townships, Elem Sec Ed School Curricu Policies, Health Care Availability Access, Higher Education, Juvenile Justice & System-Involved, Youth & Young Adults
47	Cook, DuPage	Patricia R. Bellock	Republican	1999	Member: Appropriations-Human Services, Financial Institutions, Health & Healthcare Disparities, House Budget Oversight Panel, Human Services, Labor & Commerce, Special Needs Services
48	DuPage	Peter Breen	Republican	2015	Member: Consumer Protection, Economic Development & Housing, Energy, Insurance, Judiciary - Civil, Labor & Commerce, Restorative Justice
49	Cook, DuPage, Kane	Mike Fortner	Republican	2007	Member: Cities & Villages, Energy, Intermodal Infrastructure, Renewable Energy & Sustainability, Tollway Oversight, Transportation, Regulation, Roads
50	Kane, Kendall	Keith R. Wheeler	Republican	2015	Member: Appropriations-General Service, Business Growth & Incentives, Economic Development & Housing, Labor & Commerce, Public Private Partnerships, Public Utilities, Restorative Justice, Sm Bus Empowerment Wkforce Develop, Transportation, Regulation, Roads
51	Cook, Lake	Nicholas Sauer	Republican	2016	
51	Cook, Lake	Ed Sullivan	Republican	2003	
52	Cook, Kane, Lake, McHenry	David McSweeney	Republican	2013	Member: Appropriations-Elementary & Secondary Educ, Consumer Protection, Economic Development & Housing, State Government Administration
53	Cook	David Harris	Republican	1983	Member: Appropriations-General Service, Financial Institutions, House Budget Oversight Panel, Renewable Energy & Sustainability, Revenue & Finance, State Government Administration, Tollway Oversight, Transportation, Regulation, Roads
54	Cook	Thomas Morrison	Republican	2011	Member: Appropriations-General Service, Environment, House Budget Oversight Panel, Personnel & Pensions, Renewable Energy & Sustainability, State Government Administration
55	Cook	Martin J. Moylan	Democratic	2013	Member: Cities & Villages, Intermodal Infrastructure, Tollway Oversight, Transportation, Regulation, Roads, Transportation: Vehicles & Safety, Veterans' Affairs, Youth & Young Adults
56	Cook, DuPage	Michelle Mussman	Democratic	2011	Member: Appropriations-Elementary & Secondary Educ, Appropriations-Human Services, Community College Access & Afford., Elem Sec Ed School Curricu Policies, Energy, Special Needs Services (chair), State Government Administration
57	Cook, Lake	Elaine Nekritz	Democratic	2003	Member: Appropriations-Public Safety, Judiciary - Civil (chair), Personnel & Pensions (chair), Public Utilities, Special Needs Services
58	Cook, Lake	Scott Drury	Democratic	2013	Member: Elem Sec Ed Charter School Policy, Judiciary - Criminal, Personnel & Pensions
59	Cook, Lake	Carol Sente	Democratic	2009	Member: Business Growth & Incentives (chair), Elem Sec Ed School Curricu Policies, Environment, Personnel & Pensions, Public Private Partnerships, State Government Administration, Veterans' Affairs
60	Lake	Rita Mayfield	Democratic	2010	Member: Appropriations-Human Services, Appropriations-Public Safety, Business Occupational Licenses, Community College Access & Afford., Elem Sec Ed: Licensing Oversight (chair), Health & Healthcare Disparities, Judiciary - Criminal, Public Utilities
61	Lake	Sheri Jesiel	Republican	2014	Member: Appropriations-Human Services, Appropriations-Public Safety, Elem Sec Ed School Curricu Policies, Human Services, Juvenile Justice & System-Involved, Personnel & Pensions, Sm Bus Empowerment Wkforce Develop, Special Needs Services
62	Lake	Sam Yingling	Democratic	2013	Member: Appropriations-General Service, Counties & Townships, Financial Institutions, Renewable Energy & Sustainability, State Government Administration
63	McHenry	Jack D. Franks	Democratic	1999	Member: Business Growth & Incentives, International Trade & Commerce, Public Utilities, State Government Administration (chair), Tollway Oversight, Veterans' Affairs
64	Lake, McHenry	Barbara Wheeler	Republican	2013	Member: Adoption Reform, Appropriations-Elementary & Secondary Educ, Elem Sec Ed Charter School Policy, Elem Sec Ed School Curricu Policies, Health & Healthcare Disparities, Higher Education, Judiciary - Criminal, Museums, Arts, & Cultural Enhanceme
65	Kane, McHenry	Steven A. Andersson	Republican	2015	Member: Appropriations-General Service, Cities & Villages, Judiciary - Civil, Museums, Arts, & Cultural Enhanceme, Renewable Energy & Sustainability, Sm Bus Empowerment Wkforce Develop, Transportation, Regulation, Roads
66	Kane, McHenry	Michael W. Tryon	Republican	2005	Member: Environment, Executive, Juvenile Justice & System-Involved, Labor & Commerce, Renewable Energy & Sustainability, Revenue & Finance
67	Winnebago	Litesa E. Wallace	Democratic	2014	Member: Agriculture & Conservation, Economic Development & Housing, Financial Institutions, Human Services, Renewable Energy & Sustainability
68	Winnebago	John M. Cabello	Republican	2012	Member: Appropriations-Public Safety, House Budget Oversight Panel, Intermodal Infrastructure, Judiciary - Criminal, Labor & Commerce, Public Utilities, Tollway Oversight
69	Boone, Winnebago	Joe Sosnowski	Republican	2011	Member: Appropriations-Elementary & Secondary Educ, Appropriations-Higher Education, Elem Sec Ed Charter School Policy, Elem Sec Ed School Curricu Policies, Executive, Revenue & Finance, Tollway Oversight
70	Boone, DeKalb, Kane	Robert W. Pritchard	Republican	2003	Member: Appropriations-Elementary & Secondary Educ, Appropriations-Higher Education, Elem Sec Ed School Curricu Policies, Elem Sec Ed: Licensing Oversight, Higher Education, House Budget Oversight Panel, Juvenile Justice & System-Involved, Restorative Justice, State Government Administration
71	Carroll, Henry, Rock Island, Whiteside	Mike Smiddy	Democratic	2013	Member: Appropriations-Higher Education, Community College Access & Afford., Elem Sec Ed School Curricu Policies, Juvenile Justice & System-Involved, Labor & Commerce, Transportation, Regulation, Roads
72	Rock Island	Patrick J. Verschoore	Democratic	2003	
73	Bureau, LaSalle, Marshall, Peoria, Stark, Woodford	David R. Leitch	Republican	1986	Member: Appropriations-Human Services, Community College Access & Afford., Financial Institutions, Health & Healthcare Disparities, Public Utilities, Rules
74	Bureau, Henry, Knox, Lee, Mercer	Donald L. Moffitt	Republican	1993	Member: Agriculture & Conservation, Appropriations-Public Safety, Counties & Townships, Elem Sec Ed School Curricu Policies, Financial Institutions, Intermodal Infrastructure, Veterans' Affairs
75	Grundy, Kendall, LaSalle, Will	John D. Anthony	Republican	2013	
75	Grundy, Kendall, LaSalle, Will	David A. Welter	Republican	2016	Member: Agriculture & Conservation, Appropriations-Public Safety, Elem Sec Ed Charter School Policy, Energy, Judiciary - Criminal, Restorative Justice, Special Needs Services
76	Bureau, LaSalle, Livingston, Putnam	Frank J. Mautino	Democratic	1991	
76	Bureau, LaSalle, Livingston, Putnam	Andrew F Skoog	Democratic	2015	Member: Agriculture & Conservation, Elem Sec Ed School Curricu Policies, Higher Education, Sm Bus Empowerment Wkforce Develop, Transportation, Regulation, Roads, Veterans' Affairs
77	Cook, DuPage	Kathleen Willis	Democratic	2013	Member: Appropriations-Human Services, Cities & Villages, Elem Sec Ed School Curricu Policies, Higher Education, Special Needs Services, State Government Administration, Substance Abuse Special
78	Cook	Camille Y. Lilly	Democratic	2010	Member: Appropriations-Human Services, Appropriations-Public Safety, Elem Sec Ed School Curricu Policies, Health & Healthcare Disparities, Juvenile Justice & System-Involved, Museums, Arts, & Cultural Enhanceme (chair), Transportation, Regulation, Roads
79	Grundy, Kankakee, Will	Katherine Cloonen	Democratic	2013	Member: Agriculture & Conservation, Business Growth & Incentives, Elem Sec Ed School Curricu Policies, Intermodal Infrastructure, State Government Administration, Veterans' Affairs
80	Cook, Will	Anthony DeLuca	Democratic	2009	Member: Appropriations-Public Safety, Business Growth & Incentives, Business Occupational Licenses, Cities & Villages (chair), Insurance, Tollway Oversight
81	DuPage, Will	David S. Olsen	Republican	2016	Member: Community College Access & Afford., Elem Sec Ed School Curricu Policies, Judiciary - Criminal, Public Utilities, Renewable Energy & Sustainability
81	DuPage, Will	Ron Sandack	Republican	2010	
82	Cook, DuPage, Will	Jim Durkin	Republican	1995	
83	Kane	Linda Chapa LaVia	Democratic	2003	Member: Appropriations-Higher Education, Elem Sec Ed Charter School Policy, Elem Sec Ed School Curricu Policies, Energy (chair), Financial Institutions, Public Utilities, Sm Bus Empowerment Wkforce Develop, Veterans' Affairs (chair)
84	DuPage, Kane, Kendall, Will	Stephanie A. Kifowit	Democratic	2013	Member: Appropriations-General Service, Business Growth & Incentives, Financial Institutions, Health Care Licenses, Intermodal Infrastructure
85	DuPage, Will	Emily McAsey	Democratic	2009	Member: Appropriations-Elementary & Secondary Educ, Business Growth & Incentives, Elem Sec Ed Charter School Policy (chair), Environment, Renewable Energy & Sustainability, Veterans' Affairs
86	Will	Lawrence Walsh Jr.	Democratic	2012	Member: Appropriations-General Service, Counties & Townships, Intermodal Infrastructure (chair), Labor & Commerce, Transportation, Regulation, Roads
87	Logan, Menard, Sangamon, Tazewell	Rich Brauer	Republican	2003	
87	Logan, Menard, Sangamon, Tazewell	Tim Butler	Republican	2015	Member: Environment, Museums, Arts, & Cultural Enhanceme, Tourism & Conventions, Transportation, Regulation, Roads, Transportation: Vehicles & Safety
88	McLean, Tazewell	Keith P. Sommer	Republican	1999	Member: Adoption Reform, Business Occupational Licenses, Insurance, International Trade & Commerce
89	Carroll, Jo Daviess, Ogle, Stephenson, Whiteside, Winnebago	Brian W. Stewart	Republican	2013	Member: Agriculture & Conservation, Appropriations-Public Safety, Human Services, Judiciary - Criminal, Labor & Commerce, Revenue & Finance, Veterans' Affairs
90	DeKalb, LaSalle, Lee, Ogle, Winnebago	Tom Demmer	Republican	2013	Member: Agriculture & Conservation, Appropriations-Elementary & Secondary Educ, Appropriations-Human Services, Elem Sec Ed Charter School Policy, Health & Healthcare Disparities, Higher Education, Human Services, Public Private Partnerships, Youth & Young Adults
91	Fulton, Peoria, Tazewell	Michael D. Unes	Republican	2011	Member: Appropriations-Human Services, Financial Institutions, Human Services, Insurance, International Trade & Commerce, Tourism & Conventions, Transportation: Vehicles & Safety, Veterans' Affairs
92	Peoria	Jehan Gordon-Booth	Democratic	2009	Member: Appropriations-Higher Education, Appropriations-Public Safety, Financial Institutions, Public Utilities
93	Brown, Cass, Fulton, Knox, Mason, McDonough, Schuyler, Warren	Norine K. Hammond	Republican	2010	Member: Appropriations-Higher Education, Community College Access & Afford., Consumer Protection, Higher Education, Human Services, Insurance, Transportation, Regulation, Roads
94	Adams, Hancock, Henderson, Warren	Randy E. Frese	Republican	2015	Member: Agriculture & Conservation, Appropriations-Human Services, Business Growth & Incentives, Consumer Protection, Elem Sec Ed School Curricu Policies, Public Private Partnerships, Sm Bus Empowerment Wkforce Develop, Veterans' Affairs
95	Christian, Macoupin, Madison, Montgomery	Avery Bourne	Republican	2015	Member: Agriculture & Conservation, Consumer Protection, Counties & Townships, Transportation: Vehicles & Safety, Veterans' Affairs
95	Christian, Macoupin, Madison, Montgomery	Wayne Rosenthal	Republican	2011	
96	Christian, Macon, Sangamon	Sue Scherer	Democratic	2013	Member: Agriculture & Conservation, Consumer Protection, Elem Sec Ed School Curricu Policies, Elem Sec Ed: Licensing Oversight, Intermodal Infrastructure, Sm Bus Empowerment Wkforce Develop
97	Kendall, Will	Mark Batinick	Republican	2015	Member: Appropriations-Higher Education, Business Occupational Licenses, Elem Sec Ed School Curricu Policies, Environment, Insurance, Veterans' Affairs
98	Will	Natalie A. Manley	Democratic	2013	Member: Appropriations-General Service, Appropriations-Human Services, Business Occupational Licenses, Consumer Protection, Sm Bus Empowerment Wkforce Develop, Transportation, Regulation, Roads, Transportation: Vehicles & Safety, Youth & Young Adults
99	Sangamon	Sara Wojcicki Jimenez	Republican	2015	Member: Agriculture & Conservation, Appropriations-Higher Education, Business Occupational Licenses, Economic Development & Housing, International Trade & Commerce
99	Sangamon	Raymond Poe	Republican	1995	
100	Calhoun, Greene, Jersey, Macoupin, Madison, Morgan, Pike, Sangamon, Scott	C.D. Davidsmeyer	Republican	2012	Member: Appropriations-Human Services, Business Occupational Licenses, Energy, Financial Institutions, Health Care Licenses, Insurance, Veterans' Affairs, Youth & Young Adults
101	Champaign, DeWitt, Macon, McLean, Piatt	Bill Mitchell	Republican	1999	Member: Elem Sec Ed: Licensing Oversight, Energy, Environment, Health & Healthcare Disparities, Public Utilities
102	Champaign, Douglas, Edgar, Macon, Moultrie, Shelby, Vermilion	Adam Brown	Republican	2011	Member: Appropriations-General Service, Economic Development & Housing, Financial Institutions, Health Care Licenses, Public Utilities, Youth & Young Adults
103	Champaign	Carol Ammons	Democratic	2015	Member: Appropriations-Elementary & Secondary Educ, Community College Access & Afford., Environment, Higher Education, Human Services, Personnel & Pensions, Sm Bus Empowerment Wkforce Develop, Special Needs Services
104	Champaign, Vermilion	Chad Hays	Republican	2010	Member: Executive, Health Care Availability Access, Health Care Licenses, Higher Education, Juvenile Justice & System-Involved
105	Livingston, McLean	Dan Brady	Republican	2001	Member: Appropriations-Higher Education, Community College Access & Afford., Higher Education, House Budget Oversight Panel, Insurance, Judiciary - Civil, Labor & Commerce, Special Needs Services, Transportation: Vehicles & Safety
106	Ford, Iroquois, Livingston, Vermilion, Woodford	Thomas M. Bennett	Republican	2015	Member: Appropriations-Elementary & Secondary Educ, Appropriations-Higher Education, Consumer Protection, Elem Sec Ed School Curricu Policies, Higher Education, Renewable Energy & Sustainability, State Government Administration, Transportation, Regulation, Roads
107	Bond, Clinton, Effingham, Fayette, Marion	John Cavaletto	Republican	2009	Member: Appropriations-Public Safety, Counties & Townships, Elem Sec Ed School Curricu Policies, Sm Bus Empowerment Wkforce Develop, Special Needs Services, Transportation, Regulation, Roads
108	Clinton, Madison, St. Clair, Washington	Charles Meier	Republican	2013	Member: Agriculture & Conservation, Appropriations-Human Services, Community College Access & Afford., Elem Sec Ed School Curricu Policies, Environment, Special Needs Services
109	Clay, Edwards, Effingham, Jasper, Lawrence, Richland, Wabash, Wayne, White	David B. Reis	Republican	2005	Member: Appropriations-Public Safety, Economic Development & Housing, Financial Institutions, Insurance
110	Clark, Coles, Crawford, Cumberland, Edgar, Lawrence	Reginald Phillips	Republican	2015	Member: Appropriations-Higher Education, Counties & Townships, Environment, Health & Healthcare Disparities, Labor & Commerce, Transportation, Regulation, Roads
111	Jersey, Madison	Daniel V. Beiser	Democratic	2004	Member: Appropriations-Public Safety, Environment, Intermodal Infrastructure, Transportation, Regulation, Roads (chair), Transportation: Vehicles & Safety
112	Madison, St. Clair	Dwight Kay	Republican	2011	Member: Appropriations-Human Services, Appropriations-Public Safety, Business Growth & Incentives, Economic Development & Housing, Insurance, International Trade & Commerce, Judiciary - Civil, Labor & Commerce
113	Madison, St. Clair	Jay Hoffman	Democratic	1991	Member: Appropriations-Public Safety, Judiciary - Civil, Labor & Commerce (chair), Public Utilities
114	St. Clair	Eddie Lee Jackson Sr.	Democratic	2009	Member: Appropriations-Elementary & Secondary Educ, Consumer Protection, Counties & Townships (chair), Energy, Executive
115	Jackson, Jefferson, Perry, Union, Washington	Terri Bryant	Republican	2015	Member: Appropriations-Public Safety, Intermodal Infrastructure, Judiciary - Criminal, Juvenile Justice & System-Involved, Tourism & Conventions, Veterans' Affairs, Youth & Young Adults
116	Monroe, Perry, Randolph, St. Clair	Jerry Costello II	Democratic	2011	Member: Agriculture & Conservation (chair), Consumer Protection, International Trade & Commerce, Substance Abuse Special, Tourism & Conventions, Veterans' Affairs
117	Franklin, Hamilton, Williamson	John Bradley	Democratic	2003	
117	Franklin, Hamilton, Williamson	Jim Kirkpatrick	Democratic	2017	
118	Alexander, Gallatin, Hamilton, Hardin, Jackson, Johnson, Massac, Pope, Pulaski, Saline, Union	Brandon W. Phelps	Democratic	2003	Member: Appropriations-Higher Education, Appropriations-Public Safety, Environment, Health Care Licenses, Labor & Commerce, Public Utilities (chair), Veterans' Affairs

== See also ==
- List of Illinois state legislatures
