= 100th Illinois General Assembly =

Illinois state legislative session from 2017 to 2019

←	99th	101st	→
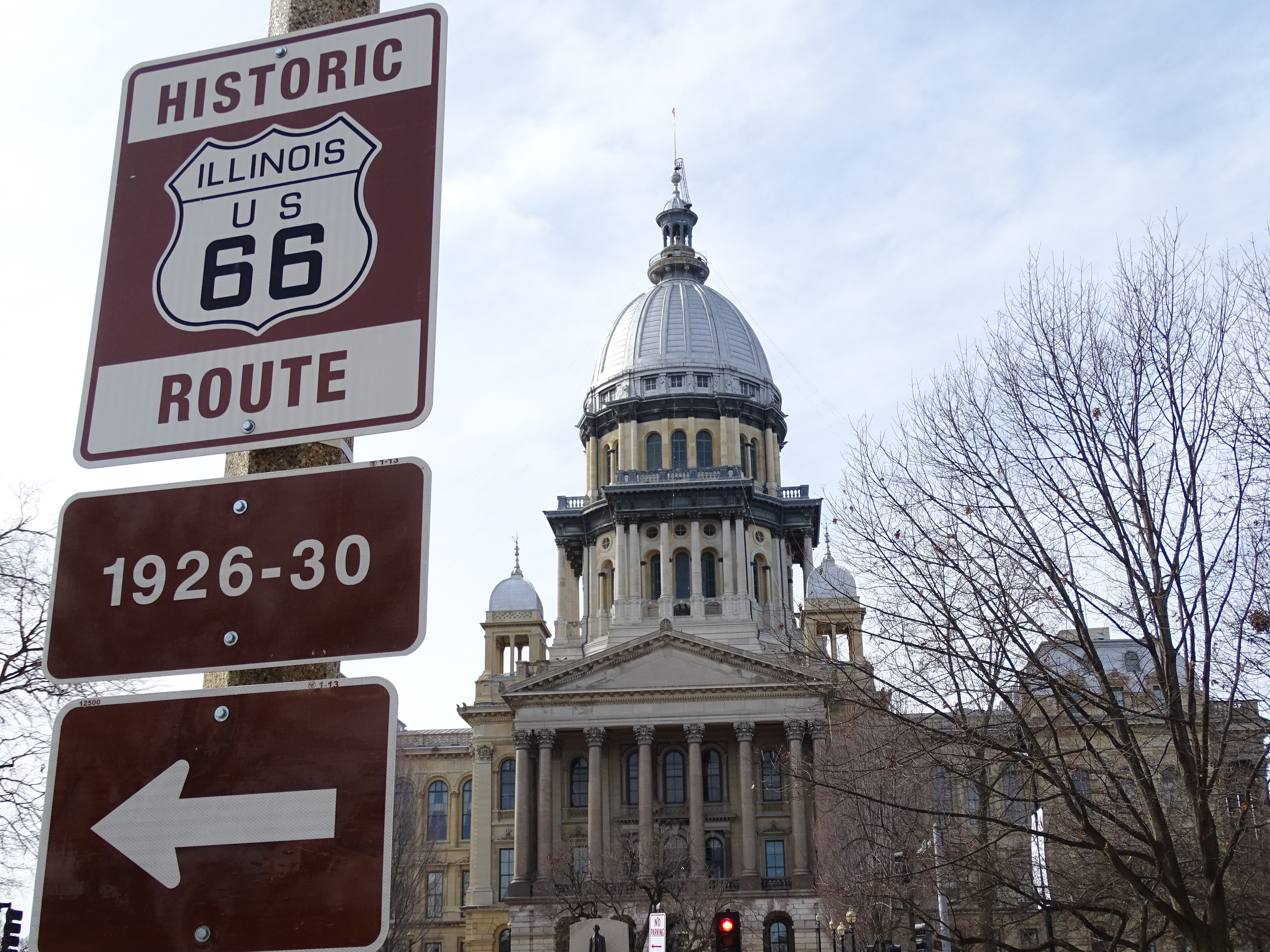
- The Illinois State Capitol in 2017

Overview
- Meeting place: Springfield, Illinois
- Term: 2017 – 2019
- Election: 2016
- Website: Official site

Illinois Senate
- President: John J. Cullerton, Democrat

Illinois House of Representatives
- Speaker: Michael J. Madigan, Democrat

The 100th Illinois General Assembly, consisting of the Illinois House and Illinois Senate, convened on January 11, 2017. It adjourned sine die on January 9, 2019.

== Legislation ==
The 100th General Assembly enacted a total of 1,190 bills into law. Notably among these, it passed the first state budget in more than two years, ending the Illinois Budget Impasse that began under the 99th Illinois General Assembly. The budget was passed over the veto of Governor Bruce Rauner.

Other laws passed over the governor's veto included a measure allowing municipalities to designate urban agriculture zones to provide tax abatements to urban farming operations. The override passed the State Senate by 49 to 1.

Other notable legislation included a measure that amended the Illinois Abortion Law of 1975, removing a trigger law that would have outlawed abortion in the state if the United States Supreme Court overturned the Roe v. Wade decision that affirmed a constitutional right to abortion. The bill was signed by Governor Rauner, who was in favor of abortion rights. Although amended, the Illinois Abortion Law nonetheless remained on the books until the passage of the Illinois Reproductive Health Act by the 101st Illinois General Assembly in 2019.

The General Assembly also amended the Illinois Endangered Species Protection Act to ban the use of elephants in traveling circuses. Illinois was the first state that banned such performances.

The General Assembly also enacted multiple gun control measures, including one that imposed a 72-hour waiting period for all firearm purchases.

In January 2018, Illinois became the first state in the US to adopt legislation recognizing postpartum depression and postpartum psychosis as mitigating factors in forcible felonies. The legislation applies to criminal sentencing as well as post-conviction relief. It was signed into law by governor Bruce Rauner just before the end of the session, on January 8, 2018.

== Senate ==
Results of the 2016 Illinois Senate election.

Of the Senate's 59 members, 40 stood for election in the 2016 Illinois Senate election. Two districts, the 47th and 59th, changed hands from the Democratic to the Republican Party.

=== Senate leadership ===
Position	Name	Party	District
President of the Senate	John J. Cullerton	Democratic	6
Majority Leader	James Clayborne	Democratic	57
Minority Leader	William E. Brady	Republican	44

=== Party composition ===
The Senate of the 100th General Assembly consisted of 22 Republicans and 37 Democrats.

Affiliation	Members
Democratic Party	37
Republican Party	22
Total	59

=== State senators ===
District	Counties represented	Senator	Party	First year	Committees
1	Cook	Antonio Muñoz	Democratic	1999	Chair: Executive Appointments; Member: Executive, Gaming, Insurance, Telecommunications and Information Technology, Veterans Affairs
2	Cook	Omar Aquino	Democratic	2016	Member: Appropriations I, Appropriations II, Education, Human Services, Labor, Licensed Activities and Pensions, Telecommunications and Information Technology
3	Cook	Mattie Hunter	Democratic	2003	Chair: Special Committee on Housing; Member: Appropriations I, Energy and Public Utilities, Executive, Human Services, Public Health
4	Cook	Kimberly A. Lightford	Democratic	1998	Chair: Assignments; Member: Education, Energy and Public Utilities, Executive, Executive Appointments, Higher Education, Labor, Special Committee on Oversight of Medicaid Managed Care, Special Committee on Supplier Diversity
5	Cook	Patricia Van Pelt	Democratic	2013	Chair: Public Health; Member: Commerce and Economic Development, Criminal Law, Energy and Public Utilities, Gaming, Special Committee on Oversight of Medicaid Managed Care, State Government
6	Cook	John J. Cullerton	Democratic	1979	Member: Executive
7	Cook	Heather A. Steans	Democratic	2008	Chair: Appropriations I, Special Committee on Oversight of Medicaid Managed Care; Member: Appropriations II, Environment and Conservation, Executive, Government Reform, Human Services
8	Cook	Ira I. Silverstein	Democratic	1999	Member: Executive; Executive Appointments; Financial Institutions; Gaming; Judiciary; Revenue
8	Cook	Ram Villivalam	Democratic	2019	
9	Cook	Daniel Biss	Democratic	2011	Chair: Labor; Member: Human Services; Education; Environment and Conservation; Executive Appointments; Revenue
9	Cook	Laura Fine	Democratic	2019	
10	Cook	John G. Mulroe	Democratic	2010	Chair: Insurance; Member: Commerce and Economic Development, Criminal Law, Executive, Judiciary, Public Health, Telecommunications and Information Technology
11	Cook	Martin A. Sandoval	Democratic	2003	Chair: Transportation, Special Committee on Supplier Diversity; Member: Energy and Public Utilities, Gaming, Special Committee on Housing, Licensed Activities and Pensions, Special Committee on State and Pension Fund Investments, Veterans Affairs
12	Cook	Steven M. Landek	Democratic	2011	Chair: State Government; Member: Appropriations II, Government Reform, Insurance, Local Government
13	Cook	Kwame Raoul	Democratic	2004	
13	Cook	Robert Peters	Democratic	2019	Chair: Judiciary; Member: Criminal Law; Executive; Gaming; Insurance; Public Health
14	Cook	Emil Jones III	Democratic	2009	Chair: Licensed Activities and Pensions; Member: Financial Institutions, Special Committee on Oversight of Medicaid Managed Care, Revenue, Telecommunications and Information Technology, Transportation
15	Cook, Will	Napoleon Harris III	Democratic	2013	Chair: Agriculture; Member: Commerce and Economic Development, Insurance, Licensed Activities and Pensions, Telecommunications and Information Technology, Transportation
16	Cook	Jacqueline Y. Collins	Democratic	2003	Chair: Financial Institutions; Member: Insurance, Transportation
17	Cook, Kankakee, Will	Elgie R. Sims Jr.	Democratic	2012	Member: Appropriations I, Appropriations II, Criminal Law, Judiciary, Telecommunications and Information Technology
17	Cook, Kankakee, Will	Donne E. Trotter	Democratic	1993	Member: Appropriations I; Appropriations II; Energy and Public Utilities; Executive
18	Cook	Bill Cunningham	Democratic	2011	Chair: Information Technology; Member: Agriculture, Appropriations II, Gaming, Higher Education, Labor, Telecommunications &, Transportation
19	Cook, Will	Michael E. Hastings	Democratic	2013	Chair: Energy and Public Utilities; Member: Appropriations I, Appropriations II, Gaming, Insurance, Judiciary, Veterans Affairs
20	Cook	Iris Y. Martinez	Democratic	2003	Chair: Special Committee on State and Pension Fund Investments; Member: Education, Energy and Public Utilities, Gaming, Labor, Licensed Activities and Pensions, Transportation
21	DuPage, Will	Michael Connelly	Republican	2009	Member: Criminal Law; Insurance; Judiciary; Labor; Telecommunications and Information Technology; Veterans Affairs
21	DuPage, Will	John J. Fisher Jr.	Republican	2019	
22	Cook, Kane	Cristina Castro	Democratic	2017	Member: Commerce and Economic Development, Financial Institutions, Higher Education, Local Government, Telecommunications and Information Technology, Transportation
23	Cook, DuPage	Thomas Cullerton	Democratic	2013	Chair: Veterans Affairs; Member: Agriculture, Higher Education, Labor, State Government, Telecommunications and Information Technology
24	Cook, DuPage	Chris Nybo	Republican	2011	Member: Executive; Financial Institutions; Commerce and Economic Development; Energy and Public Utilities; Gaming; Revenue
24	Cook, DuPage	Yadav Nathwani	Republican	2018	Member: Commerce and Economic Development, Energy and Public Utilities, Financial Institutions, Gaming, Special Committee on Oversight of Medicaid Managed Care
25	Cook, DuPage, Kane, Kendall	Jim Oberweis	Republican	2013	Member: Appropriations II, Environment and Conservation, Executive, Human Services, Labor, Transportation
26	Cook, Kane, Lake, McHenry	Dan McConchie	Republican	2016	Chair: Special Committee on State and Pension Fund Investments; Member: Appropriations I, Appropriations II, Education, Government Reform, Insurance, Licensed Activities and Pensions
27	Cook	Tom Rooney	Republican	2016	Member: Appropriations II, Gaming, Government Reform, Higher Education, Licensed Activities and Pensions, Telecommunications and Information Technology
28	Cook, DuPage	Laura M. Murphy	Democratic	2015	Member: Appropriations II, Gaming, Government Reform, Higher Education, Public Health, State Government
29	Cook, Lake	Julie A. Morrison	Democratic	2013	Chair: Human Services; Member: Appropriations II, Environment and Conservation, Gaming, Government Reform, Special Committee on Oversight of Medicaid Managed Care, Transportation
30	Cook, Lake	Terry Link	Democratic	1997	Member: Assignments, Energy and Public Utilities, Executive, Executive Appointments, Financial Institutions, Gaming, Insurance
31	Lake	Melinda Bush	Democratic	2013	Chair: Government Reform; Member: Education, Environment and Conservation, Human Services, Licensed Activities and Pensions, Local Government, Revenue
32	Lake, McHenry	Pamela J. Althoff	Republican	2003	Member: Assignments; Licensed Activities and Pensions; Revenue, GOP spokesperson; Executive Appointments; Labor; Telecommunications and Information Technology; Transportation
32	Lake, McHenry	Craig Wilcox	Republican	2018	Member: Agriculture, Labor, Licensed Activities and Pensions, Special Committee on Oversight of Medicaid Managed Care, Revenue, Transportation, Veterans Affairs
33	Kane, McHenry	Karen McConnaughay	Republican	2013	Member: Transportation; Appropriations II; Education; Energy and Public Utilities; Gaming; Revenue.
33	Kane, McHenry	Donald P. DeWitte	Republican	2018	Member: Appropriations II, Education, Energy and Public Utilities, Gaming, Revenue, Transportation
34	Winnebago	Steve Stadelman	Democratic	2013	Chair: Gaming; Member: Commerce and Economic Development, Government Reform, Higher Education, Telecommunications and Information Technology, Transportation
35	Boone, DeKalb, Kane, Winnebago	Dave Syverson	Republican	1993	Member: Executive, Gaming, Human Services, Insurance, Special Committee on Oversight of Medicaid Managed Care, Public Health, Telecommunications and Information Technology
36	Carroll, Henry, Rock Island, Whiteside	Neil Anderson	Republican	2015	Member: Agriculture, Commerce and Economic Development, Energy and Public Utilities, Gaming, Licensed Activities and Pensions, Transportation
37	Bureau, Henry, Knox, LaSalle, Lee, Marshall, Mercer, Peoria, Stark, Woodford	Chuck Weaver	Republican	2015	Member: Education, Executive Appointments, Special Committee on Housing, Insurance, Labor, Licensed Activities and Pensions, Telecommunications and Information Technology
38	Bureau, Grundy, Kendall, LaSalle, Livingston, Putnam, Will	Sue Rezin	Republican	2010	Member: Appropriations I, Education, Energy and Public Utilities, Executive, Higher Education, Transportation
39	Cook, DuPage	Don Harmon	Democratic	2003	Chair: Executive; Member: Assignments, Criminal Law, Financial Institutions, Judiciary
40	Cook, Grundy, Kankakee, Will	Toi W. Hutchinson	Democratic	2009	Chair: Revenue; Member: Commerce and Economic Development, Government Reform, Judiciary, Public Health, Special Committee on State and Pension Fund Investments, Transportation
41	Cook, DuPage, Will	Christine Radogno	Republican	1997	Member: Executive
41	Cook, DuPage, Will	John F. Curran	Republican	2017	Member: Commerce and Economic Development, Energy and Public Utilities, Local Government, Special Committee on Oversight of Medicaid Managed Care, Special Committee on State and Pension Fund Investments, State Government, Transportation
42	DuPage, Kane, Kendall, Will	Linda Holmes	Democratic	2007	Chair: Commerce and Economic Development; Member: Agriculture, Special Committee on Housing, Insurance, Labor, Local Government, Telecommunications and Information Technology
43	DuPage, Will	Pat McGuire	Democratic	2012	Chair: Higher Education; Member: Appropriations II, Environment and Conservation, Special Committee on Housing, Revenue, State Government, Transportation
44	Logan, McLean, Menard, Sangamon, Tazewell	William E. Brady	Republican	1993	Member: Executive
45	Carroll, DeKalb, Jo Daviess, LaSalle, Lee, Ogle, Stephenson, Whiteside, Winnebago	Tim Bivins	Republican	2008	Member: Local Government; Criminal Law; Government Reform; Human Services; Insurance; Veterans Affairs
45	Carroll, DeKalb, Jo Daviess, LaSalle, Lee, Ogle, Stephenson, Whiteside, Winnebago	Brian W. Stewart	Republican	2018	Member: Criminal Law, Government Reform, Human Services, Insurance, Local Government, Veterans Affairs
46	Fulton, Peoria, Tazewell	David Koehler	Democratic	2006	Chair: Environment and Conservation; Member: Agriculture, Education, Labor, Local Government, Special Committee on Oversight of Medicaid Managed Care, Special Committee on Supplier Diversity, Transportation
47	Adams, Brown, Cass, Fulton, Hancock, Henderson, Knox, Mason, McDonough, Schuyler, Warren	Jil Tracy	Republican	2017	Member: Agriculture, Criminal Law, Executive Appointments, Special Committee on Housing, Judiciary, Labor, Revenue, Special Committee on State and Pension Fund Investments, State Government, Telecommunications and Information Technology
48	Christian, Macon, Macoupin, Madison, Montgomery, Sangamon	Andy Manar	Democratic	2013	Chair: Appropriations II; Member: Agriculture, Appropriations I, Education, Executive Appointments, Labor, Special Committee on Oversight of Medicaid Managed Care
49	Kendall, Will	Jennifer Bertino-Tarrant	Democratic	2013	Chair: Education; Member: Appropriations II, Labor, Licensed Activities and Pensions, Transportation
50	Calhoun, Greene, Jersey, Macoupin, Madison, Morgan, Pike, Sangamon, Scott	Wm. Sam McCann	Republican	2011	Member: Agriculture, Environment and Conservation, Gaming, Government Reform, Higher Education, Public Health
51	Champaign, DeWitt, Douglas, Edgar, Macon, McLean, Moultrie, Piatt, Shelby, Vermilion	Chapin Rose	Republican	2003	Member: Appropriations I, Appropriations II, Financial Institutions, Higher Education, Insurance
52	Champaign, Vermilion	Scott M. Bennett	Democratic	2015	Chair: Criminal Law; Member: Agriculture, Appropriations II, Gaming, Higher Education, Labor
53	Ford, Iroquois, Livingston, McLean, Vermilion, Woodford	Jason A. Barickman	Republican	2011	Member: Criminal Law, Education, Executive, Judiciary, Labor
54	Bond, Clinton, Effingham, Fayette, Madison, Marion, St. Clair, Washington	Kyle McCarter	Republican	2009	Member: Appropriations II, Environment and Conservation, Labor, Local Government, Public Health, State Government
55	Clark, Clay, Coles, Crawford, Cumberland, Edgar, Edwards, Effingham, Jasper, Lawrence, Richland, Wabash, Wayne, White	Dale A. Righter	Republican	1998	Member: Appropriations I, Appropriations II, Assignments, Executive, Executive Appointments, Special Committee on Housing, Human Services, Insurance, Special Committee on Oversight of Medicaid Managed Care, Special Committee on Supplier Diversity, Telecommunications and Information Technology
56	Jersey, Madison, St. Clair	William R. Haine	Democratic	2002	Member: Criminal Law, Insurance, Judiciary, Licensed Activities and Pensions, Veterans Affairs
57	Madison, St. Clair	James F. Clayborne Jr.	Democratic	1995	Chair: Assignments; Member: Judiciary; Energy and Public Utilities; Executive; Insurance
57	Madison, St. Clair	Christopher R. Belt	Democratic	2019	
58	Jackson, Jefferson, Monroe, Perry, Randolph, St. Clair, Union, Washington	Paul Schimpf	Republican	2017	Member: Agriculture, Commerce and Economic Development, Financial Institutions, Judiciary, Special Committee on State and Pension Fund Investments, Special Committee on Supplier Diversity, Telecommunications and Information Technology, Veterans Affairs
59	Alexander, Franklin, Gallatin, Hamilton, Hardin, Jackson, Johnson, Massac, Pope, Pulaski, Saline, Union, Williamson	Dale Fowler	Republican	2017	Member: Agriculture, Commerce and Economic Development, Gaming, Higher Education, Transportation

== House ==
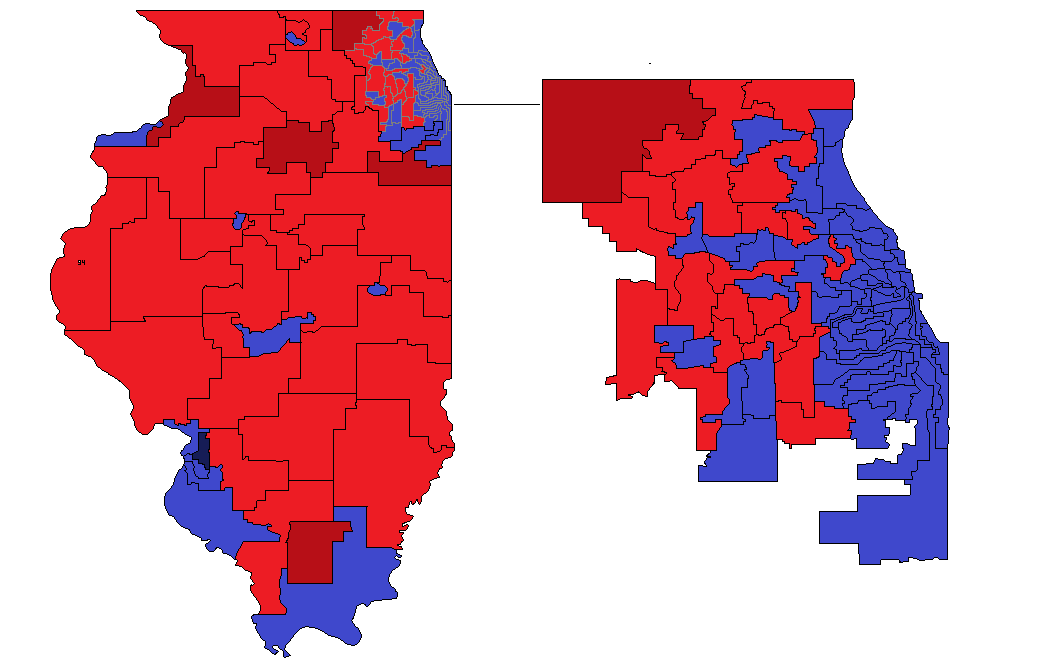
2016 Illinois House election results, with Chicago area on right.

=== Party composition ===
The House of the 100th General Assembly consisted of 51 Republicans and 67 Democrats. The composition reflects the results of the 2016 election.

Affiliation	Members
Democratic Party	67
Republican Party	51
Total	118

=== House leadership ===
Position	Name	Party	District
Speaker of the House	Michael J. Madigan	Democratic	22
Majority Leader	Barbara Flynn Currie	Democratic	25
Minority Leader	Jim Durkin	Republican	82

=== State representatives ===
District	Counties represented	Representative	Party	First year	Committees
1	Cook	Daniel J. Burke	Democratic	1991	Chair: Executive; Member: Executive; Agriculture & Conservation; Elementary & Secondary Education: Charter School Policy; Financial Institutions
2	Cook	Theresa Mah	Democratic	2017	Member: Aging; Appropriations-Elementary & Secondary Education; Community College Access & Affordability; Construction Industry & Code Enforcement; Consumer Protection; Health & Healthcare Disparities; Health Care Licenses; Museums, Arts, & Cultural Enhancement
3	Cook	Luis Arroyo	Democratic	2006	Member: Appropriations-Public Safety; Energy; Environment; Executive; Labor & Commerce; Public Utilities
4	Cook	Cynthia Soto	Democratic	2001	Chair: Health Care Licenses; Member: Appropriations-Higher Education; Appropriations-Elementary & Secondary Education; Human Services
4	Cook	Delia Ramirez	Democratic	2018	
5	Cook	Juliana Stratton	Democratic	2017	Member: Aging; Economic Justice & Equity; Higher Education; Judiciary - Criminal; Mental Health
5	Cook	Lamont J. Robinson Jr.	Democratic	2019	
6	Cook	Sonya M. Harper	Democratic	2015	Member: Agriculture & Conservation; Appropriations-General Service; Business Incentives for Local Communities; Elementary and Secondary Education: School Curriculum & Policies; Environment; Police & First Responders; Restorative Justice
7	Cook	Emanuel Chris Welch	Democratic	2013	Chair: Higher Education; Member: Appropriations-Elementary & Secondary Education; Appropriations-Higher Education; Cities & Villages; Executive; Judiciary - Civil; Labor & Commerce; Revenue & Finance
8	Cook	La Shawn K. Ford	Democratic	2007	Chair: Financial Institutions; Restorative Justice; Member: Appropriations-Elementary & Secondary Education; Appropriations-Human Services; Higher Education; Insurance: Property & Casualty; Tourism, Hospitality & Craft Industries; Veterans' Affairs
9	Cook	Arthur Turner	Democratic	2010	Chair: Judiciary - Criminal; Member: Energy; Environment; Executive; Mass Transit; Revenue & Finance; Rules; Tourism, Hospitality & Craft Industries
10	Cook	Melissa Conyears-Ervin	Democratic	2017	Member: Appropriations-Elementary & Secondary Education; Business Incentives for Local Communities; Economic Opportunity; Health Care Availability & Accessibility; Insurance: Property & Casualty; Transportation: Vehicles & Safety
11	Cook	Ann M. Williams	Democratic	2011	Chair: Tourism, Hospitality & Craft Industries; Member: Judiciary - Civil; Labor & Commerce; Police & First Responders; Veterans' Affairs
12	Cook	Sara Feigenholtz	Democratic	1995	Member: Appropriations-Human Services; Energy; Environment; Insurance: Health & Life; Mental Health; Tourism, Hospitality & Craft Industries
13	Cook	Gregory Harris	Democratic	2006	Chair: Appropriations-Human Services; Member: Aging; Executive; Insurance: Health & Life; Insurance: Property & Casualty; Rules
14	Cook	Kelly M. Cassidy	Democratic	2011	Chair: Appropriations-Public Safety; Member: Economic Opportunity; Human Services; Judiciary - Criminal; Labor & Commerce; Restorative Justice; Tourism, Hospitality & Craft Industries
15	Cook	John C. D'Amico	Democratic	2004	Chair: Transportation: Vehicles & Safety; Member: Aging; Labor & Commerce; Transportation: Regulation, Roads; Veterans' Affairs
16	Cook	Lou Lang	Democratic	1987	Member: Agriculture & Conservation; Elections & Campaign Finance; Insurance: Property & Casualty; Mental Health
17	Cook	Laura Fine	Democratic	2013	Chair: Insurance: Health & Life; Member: Mental Health
17	Cook	Jennifer Gong-Gershowitz	Democratic	2019	
18	Cook	Robyn Gabel	Democratic	2010	Chair: Human Services; Member: Appropriations-Human Services; Business Growth & Incentives; Elections & Campaign Finance; Environment; Insurance: Health & Life; Museums, Arts, & Cultural Enhancement
19	Cook	Robert Martwick	Democratic	2013	Chair: Personnel & Pensions; Member: Elementary & Secondary Education: School Curriculum & Policies; Revenue & Finance; Transportation: Regulation, Roads
20	Cook	Michael P. McAuliffe	Republican	1996	Member: Appropriations-Public Safety; Executive; Health Care Availability & Accessibility; Health Care Licenses; Police & First Responders; Public Utilities; Veterans' Affairs
21	Cook	Silvana Tabares	Democratic	2013	Chair: Elections & Campaign Finance; Member: Health Care Availability & Accessibility; Fire & Emergency Services; Labor & Commerce; Mass Transit; Police & First Responders
21	Cook	Celina Villanueva	Democratic	2018	Member: Appropriations-Higher Education; Elections & Campaign Finance; Labor & Commerce; Public Utilities
22	Cook	Michael J. Madigan	Democratic	1971	Chair: - Member: All house committees' ex officio member
23	Cook	Michael J. Zalewski	Democratic	2008	Chair: Revenue & Finance; Member: Cybersecurity, Data Analytics, & IT; Elections & Campaign Finance; Health Care Licenses; Higher Education; Insurance: Health & Life; Labor & Commerce; Personnel & Pensions
24	Cook	Elizabeth Hernandez	Democratic	2007	Chair: Consumer Protection; Member: Appropriations-Elementary & Secondary Education; Appropriations-Human Services; Elementary and Secondary Education: Licensing, Administration & Oversight; Health Care Licenses; Higher Education; Labor & Commerce
25	Cook	Barbara Flynn Currie	Democratic	1979	Chair: Rules; Member: Agriculture & Conservation; Executive; Personnel & Pensions; Revenue & Finance
26	Cook	Christian L. Mitchell	Democratic	2013	Chair: Economic Opportunity; Member: Appropriations-Higher Education; Cybersecurity, Data Analytics, & IT; Judiciary - Criminal; State Government Administration
27	Cook	Justin Slaughter	Democratic	2017	Member: Appropriations-Elementary & Secondary Education; Business Incentives for Local Communities; Economic Justice & Equity; Energy; Health & Healthcare Disparities; Judiciary - Criminal; Police & First Responders; Restorative Justice
28	Cook	Robert Rita	Democratic	2003	Chair: Business & Occupational Licenses; Tollway Oversight; Member: Consumer Protection; Executive; Insurance: Health & Life; Mental Health; Revenue & Finance
29	Cook, Will	Thaddeus Jones	Democratic	2011	Chair: Community College Access & Affordability; Member: Appropriations-Higher Education; Appropriations-Public Safety; Judiciary - Civil; Labor & Commerce; Public Utilities
30	Cook	William Davis	Democratic	2003	Chair: Appropriations-Elementary & Secondary Education; Health & Healthcare Disparities; Member: Appropriations-Higher Education; Appropriations-Public Safety; International Trade & Commerce; Labor & Commerce
31	Cook	Mary E. Flowers	Democratic	1985	Chair: Health Care Availability & Accessibility; Member: Economic Justice & Equity; Economic Opportunity; Higher Education; Human Services; Museums, Arts, & Cultural Enhancement; Restorative Justice; Special Needs Services
32	Cook	André Thapedi	Democratic	2009	Chair: International Trade & Commerce; Judiciary - Civil; Member: Appropriations-Public Safety; Labor & Commerce; Public Utilities
33	Cook	Marcus C. Evans Jr.	Democratic	2012	Chair: Transportation: Regulation, Roads; Member: Appropriations-Public Safety; Business & Occupational Licenses; Executive; Revenue & Finance; Tourism, Hospitality & Craft Industries; Transportation: Vehicles & Safety
34	Cook, Kankakee, Will	Elgie R. Sims Jr.	Democratic	2012	Chair: Judiciary - Criminal; Member: Revenue & Finance; Energy; Executive; Public Utilities
34	Cook, Kankakee, Will	Nicholas K Smith	Democratic	2018	Member: Appropriations-Higher Education; Economic Opportunity; Health Care Licenses; Higher Education; Transportation: Regulation, Roads
35	Cook	Frances Ann Hurley	Democratic	2013	Chair: Police & First Responders; Member: Appropriations-General Service; Business Incentives for Local Communities; Fire & Emergency Services; Government Consolidation & Modernization; Labor & Commerce; Special Needs Services; Transportation: Vehicles & Safety
36	Cook	Kelly M. Burke	Democratic	2011	Chair: Appropriations-Higher Education; Member: Health Care Licenses; Labor & Commerce; Personnel & Pensions; Police & First Responders; Tollway Oversight; Tourism, Hospitality & Craft Industries
37	Cook, Will	Margo McDermed	Republican	2015	Member: Economic Justice & Equity; Elections & Campaign Finance; Environment; Health Care Licenses; Mental Health; Transportation: Regulation, Roads
38	Cook, Will	Al Riley	Democratic	2007	Chair: State Government Administration; Member: Appropriations-Higher Education; Cities & Villages; Counties & Townships; Cybersecurity, Data Analytics, & IT; Mass Transit; Public Utilities
39	Cook	Will Guzzardi	Democratic	2015	Member: Appropriations-General Service; Economic Opportunity; Elections & Campaign Finance; Elementary and Secondary Education: School Curriculum & Policies; Judiciary - Criminal; Restorative Justice
40	Cook	Jaime M. Andrade Jr.	Democratic	2013	Chair: Cybersecurity, Data Analytics, & IT; Member: Business & Occupational Licenses; Construction Industry & Code Enforcement; Financial Institutions; Human Services; Mass Transit; Transportation: Regulation, Roads
41	DuPage, Will	Grant Wehrli	Republican	2015	Member: Appropriations-Higher Education; Cities & Villages; Energy; Labor & Commerce; Personnel & Pensions; Public Utilities
42	DuPage	Jeanne M Ives	Republican	2013	Member: Appropriations-Elementary & Secondary Education; Community College Access & Affordability; Elementary and Secondary Education: Licensing, Administration & Oversight; Government Transparency; Health Care Licenses; Labor & Commerce; Mass Transit; Personnel & Pensions
43	Cook, Kane	Anna Moeller	Democratic	2014	Chair: Aging; Elementary and Secondary Education: Charter School Policy; Member: Construction Industry & Code Enforcement; Energy; Environment; Health Care Licenses
44	Cook	Fred Crespo	Democratic	2007	Chair: Appropriations-General Service; Elementary & Secondary Education: School Curriculum & Policies; Member: Mental Health; Public Utilities
45	Cook, DuPage	Christine Winger	Republican	2015	Member: Aging; Appropriations-Public Safety; Cybersecurity, Data Analytics, & IT; Mass Transit; Police & First Responders; Transportation: Regulation, Roads
46	DuPage	Deb Conroy	Democratic	2013	Chair: Mental Health; Member: Construction Industry & Code Enforcement; Elementary and Secondary Education: School Curriculum & Policies; Government Consolidation & Modernization; Higher Education; Police & First Responders
47	Cook, DuPage	Patricia R. Bellock	Republican	1999	Member: Appropriations-Human Services; Human Services; Environment; Health & Healthcare Disparities; Mental Health
47	Cook, DuPage	Deanne M. Mazzochi	Republican	2018	Member: Environment; Health & Healthcare Disparities; Judiciary - Civil; Mental Health
48	DuPage	Peter Breen	Republican	2015	Member: Energy; Financial Institutions; Judiciary - Civil; Labor & Commerce; Public Utilities; Restorative Justice
49	Cook, DuPage, Kane	Mike Fortner	Republican	2007	Member: Appropriations-Higher Education; Cities & Villages; Cybersecurity, Data Analytics, & IT; Economic Opportunity; Elections & Campaign Finance; Energy; Health Care Licenses; State Government Administration, Tollway Oversight
50	Kane, Kendall	Keith R. Wheeler	Republican	2015	Member: Appropriations-General Service; Construction Industry & Code Enforcement; Cybersecurity, Data Analytics, & IT; Economic Opportunity; Health Care Licenses; Labor & Commerce; Mass Transit; Public Utilities
51	Cook, Lake	Nick Sauer	Republican	2016	Member: Economic Opportunity; Elections & Campaign Finance; Human Services; International Trade & Commerce; Labor & Commerce
51	Cook, Lake	Helene Miller Walsh	Republican	2018	Member: Economic Opportunity; Elections & Campaign Finance; Elementary and Secondary Education: Charter School Policy; Human Services; International Trade & Commerce; Labor & Commerce
52	Cook, Kane, Lake, McHenry	David McSweeney	Republican	2013	Member: Government Consolidation & Modernization; Personnel & Pensions; Revenue & Finance; State Government Administration
53	Cook	David Harris	Republican	1983	Member: Appropriations-General Service; Cybersecurity, Data Analytics, & IT; Government Consolidation & Modernization; Revenue & Finance; Transportation: Vehicles & Safety
54	Cook	Thomas Morrison	Republican	2011	Member: Economic Justice & Equity; Elementary and Secondary Education: Charter School Policy; Environment; Insurance: Health & Life; Personnel & Pensions
55	Cook	Martin J. Moylan	Democratic	2013	Chair: Construction Industry & Code Enforcement; Member: Cities & Villages; Community College Access & Affordability; Government Consolidation & Modernization; Mass Transit; Transportation: Vehicles & Safety
56	Cook, DuPage	Michelle Mussman	Democratic	2011	Chair: Mass Transit; Special Needs Services; Member: Appropriations-Elementary & Secondary Education; Appropriations-Human Services; Business Incentives for Local Communities; Cost Benefit Analysis; Elementary and Secondary Education: School Curriculum & Policies; Government Transparency; Mental Health
57	Cook, Lake	Elaine Nekritz	Democratic	2003	Member: Appropriations-Public Safety; Cybersecurity, Data Analytics & IT; Elections & Campaign Finance; Government Consolidation & Modernization; Judiciary - Criminal; Personnel & Pensions
57	Cook, Lake	Jonathan Carroll	Democratic	2017	Member: Cybersecurity, Data Analytics, & IT; Elementary and Secondary Education: Charter School Policy; Government Consolidation & Modernization; Mass Transit
58	Cook, Lake	Scott Drury	Democratic	2013	Member: Cybersecurity, Data Analytics, & IT; Elementary and Secondary Education: Charter School Policy; Government Transparency; Judiciary - Civil; Personnel & Pensions
59	Cook, Lake	Carol Sente	Democratic	2009	Chair: Business Growth & Incentives; Environment; Member: Appropriations-General Service; Construction Industry & Code Enforcement; Elementary and Secondary Education: School Curriculum & Policies; Personnel & Pensions
60	Lake	Rita Mayfield	Democratic	2010	Chair: Elementary and Secondary Education: Licensing, Administration & Oversight; Member: Aging; Appropriations-Human Services; Appropriations-Public Safety; Community College Access & Affordability; Judiciary - Criminal; Labor & Commerce; Public Utilities
61	Lake	Sheri Jesiel	Republican	2014	Member: Appropriations-Elementary & Secondary Education; Appropriations-Human Services; Business Growth & Incentives; Human Services; Mass Transit; Personnel & Pensions
62	Lake	Sam Yingling	Democratic	2013	Chair: Government Consolidation & Modernization; Member: Cities & Villages; Counties & Townships; Elections & Campaign Finance; Insurance: Health & Life; State Government Administration
63	McHenry	Steven Reick	Republican	2017	Member: Appropriations-Elementary & Secondary Education; Economic Justice & Equity; Elementary and Secondary Education: School Curriculum & Policies; Higher Education; Labor & Commerce; Restorative Justice
64	Lake, McHenry	Barbara Wheeler	Republican	2013	Member: Health Care Licenses; Higher Education; Judiciary - Criminal; Labor & Commerce; Police & First Responders; Restorative Justice; Tourism, Hospitality & Craft Industries
65	Kane, McHenry	Steven A. Andersson	Republican	2015	Member: Appropriations-General Service; Business Incentives for Local Communities; Construction Industry & Code Enforcement; Judiciary - Civil; Mental Health; Museums, Arts, & Cultural Enhancement
66	Kane, McHenry	Allen Skillicorn	Republican	2017	Member: Business & Occupational Licenses; Economic Justice & Equity; Environment; Government Consolidation & Modernization; Government Transparency
67	Winnebago	Litesa E. Wallace	Democratic	2014	Chair: Economic Justice & Equity; Member: Agriculture & Conservation; Business Growth & Incentives; Financial Institutions; Human Services; Mental Health; Restorative Justice
68	Winnebago	John M. Cabello	Republican	2012	Member: Appropriations-Public Safety; Construction Industry & Code Enforcement; Judiciary - Criminal; Police & First Responders; Tollway Oversight
69	Boone, Winnebago	Joe Sosnowski	Republican	2011	Member: Appropriations-Elementary & Secondary Education; Cities & Villages; Elementary and Secondary Education: Charter School Policy; Executive; Revenue & Finance
70	Boone, DeKalb, Kane	Robert W. Pritchard	Republican	2003	Member: Appropriations-Elementary & Secondary Education; Elementary & Secondary Education: School Curriculum & Policies; State Government Administration; Appropriations-Higher Education; Elementary & Secondary Education: Licensing, Administration & Oversight; Higher Education
70	Boone, DeKalb, Kane	Jeff Keicher	Republican	2018	Member: Appropriations-Higher Education; Elementary and Secondary Education: Licensing, Administration & Oversight; Elementary and Secondary Education: School Curriculum & Policies; Higher Education
71	Carroll, Henry, Rock Island, Whiteside	Tony McCombie	Republican	2017	Member: Business & Occupational Licenses; Business Incentives for Local Communities; Cities & Villages; Elementary and Secondary Education: School Curriculum & Policies; Tourism, Hospitality & Craft Industries; Transportation: Regulation, Roads
72	Rock Island	Michael Halpin	Democratic	2017	Member: Agriculture & Conservation; Cities & Villages; Higher Education; Judiciary - Civil; Transportation: Regulation, Roads; Veterans' Affairs
73	Bureau, LaSalle, Marshall, Peoria, Stark, Woodford	Ryan Spain	Republican	2017	Member: Appropriations-Human Services; Business Incentives for Local Communities; Cities & Villages; Economic Opportunity; Mental Health; Public Utilities; Transportation: Vehicles & Safety
74	Bureau, Henry, Knox, Lee, Mercer	Daniel Swanson	Republican	2017	Member: Agriculture & Conservation; Appropriations-Public Safety; Elementary and Secondary Education: School Curriculum & Policies; Fire & Emergency Services; Police & First Responders; Veterans' Affairs
75	Grundy, Kendall, LaSalle, Will	David A. Welter	Republican	2016	Member: Appropriations-Human Services; Appropriations-Public Safety; Counties & Townships; Energy; Police & First Responders; Public Utilities
76	Bureau, LaSalle, Livingston, Putnam	Jerry Lee Long	Republican	2017	Member: Aging; Appropriations-Public Safety; Business Incentives for Local Communities; Community College Access & Affordability; Economic Opportunity; Police & First Responders; Transportation: Regulation, Roads
77	Cook, DuPage	Kathleen Willis	Democratic	2013	Chair: Fire & Emergency Services; Member: Appropriations-Human Services; Cities & Villages; Elementary and Secondary Education: School Curriculum & Policies; Government Consolidation & Modernization; Higher Education; State Government Administration
78	Cook	Camille Y. Lilly	Democratic	2010	Chair: Insurance: Property & Casualty; Museums, Arts, & Cultural Enhancement; Member: Appropriations-Human Services; Appropriations-Public Safety; Economic Opportunity; Elementary and Secondary Education: School Curriculum & Policies; Government Transparency; Mental Health; Public Utilities
79	Grundy, Kankakee, Will	Lindsay Parkhurst	Republican	2017	Member: Appropriations-Elementary & Secondary Education; Appropriations-General Service; Judiciary - Civil; Judiciary - Criminal; Restorative Justice; Transportation: Regulation, Roads
80	Cook, Will	Anthony DeLuca	Democratic	2009	Chair: Cities & Villages; Member: Business & Occupational Licenses; Health Care Licenses; Insurance: Health & Life; Tollway Oversight
81	DuPage, Will	David S. Olsen	Republican	2016	Member: Aging; Appropriations-General Service; Elementary and Secondary Education: Licensing, Administration & Oversight; Financial Institutions; Government Consolidation & Modernization; Mass Transit
82	Cook, DuPage, Will	Jim Durkin	Republican	1995	Member: ex-officio member of all House committees
83	Kane	Linda Chapa LaVia	Democratic	2003	Chair: Energy; Veterans' Affairs; Member: Aging; Appropriations-Higher Education; Cities & Villages; Elections & Campaign Finance; Elementary and Secondary Education: Licensing, Administration & Oversight; Elementary and Secondary Education: School Curriculum & Policies; Labor & Commerce; Personnel & Pensions; Public Utilities
84	DuPage, Kane, Kendall, Will	Stephanie A. Kifowit	Democratic	2013	Chair: Government Transparency; Member: Appropriations-General Service; Appropriations-Higher Education; Business Incentives for Local Communities; Insurance: Health & Life; Mental Health
85	DuPage, Will	Emily McAsey	Democratic	2009	Chair: Elementary & Secondary Education: Charter School Policy; Member: Aging; Appropriations-Elementary & Secondary Education; Environment; Veterans' Affairs
85	DuPage, Will	John Connor	Democratic	2017	Member: Aging; Appropriations-Elementary & Secondary Education; Economic Opportunity; Judiciary - Criminal
86	Will	Lawrence Walsh Jr.	Democratic	2012	Chair: Counties & Townships; Member: Cost Benefit Analysis; Environment; Labor & Commerce; Mass Transit; Public Utilities
87	Logan, Menard, Sangamon, Tazewell	Tim Butler	Republican	2015	Member: Appropriations-Public Safety; Elections & Campaign Finance; Environment; Executive; Museums, Arts, & Cultural Enhancement; Public Utilities; Tourism, Hospitality & Craft Industries; Transportation: Vehicles & Safety
88	McLean, Tazewell	Keith P. Sommer	Republican	1999	Member: Business Growth & Incentives; Financial Institutions; Insurance: Property & Casualty; International Trade & Commerce
89	Carroll, Jo Daviess, Ogle, Stephenson, Whiteside, Winnebago	Andrew S. Chesney	Republican	2018	Member: Agriculture & Conservation; Judiciary - Criminal; Labor & Commerce; Restorative Justice; Revenue & Finance; Veterans' Affairs
89	Carroll, Jo Daviess, Ogle, Stephenson, Whiteside, Winnebago	Brian W. Stewart	Republican	2013	Member: Appropriations-Public Safety
90	DeKalb, LaSalle, Lee, Ogle, Winnebago	Tom Demmer	Republican	2013	Member: Appropriations-Human Services; Cost Benefit Analysis; Cybersecurity, Data Analytics, & IT; Elementary and Secondary Education: Charter School Policy; Health Care Availability & Accessibility; Higher Education; Human Services; Mental Health; Rules
91	Fulton, Peoria, Tazewell	Michael D. Unes	Republican	2011	Member: Health & Healthcare Disparities; Insurance: Health & Life; Insurance: Property & Casualty; Mental Health; Transportation: Vehicles & Safety; Veterans' Affairs
92	Peoria	Jehan Gordon-Booth	Democratic	2009	Member: Appropriations-Higher Education; Appropriations-Public Safety; Economic Justice & Equity; Financial Institutions; International Trade & Commerce; Public Utilities
93	Brown, Cass, Fulton, Knox, Mason, McDonough, Schuyler, Warren	Norine K. Hammond	Republican	2010	Member: Appropriations-Higher Education; Consumer Protection; Higher Education; Human Services; Insurance: Health & Life
94	Adams, Hancock, Henderson, Warren	Randy E. Frese	Republican	2015	Member: Agriculture & Conservation; Appropriations-Human Services; Consumer Protection; Economic Opportunity; Elementary and Secondary Education: School Curriculum & Policies; Labor & Commerce; Veterans' Affairs
95	Christian, Macoupin, Madison, Montgomery	Avery Bourne	Republican	2015	Member: Aging; Agriculture & Conservation; Appropriations-Elementary & Secondary Education; Elections & Campaign Finance
96	Christian, Macon, Sangamon	Sue Scherer	Democratic	2013	Chair: Business Incentives for Local Communities; Member: Agriculture & Conservation; Economic Opportunity; Elementary and Secondary Education: Licensing, Administration & Oversight; Elementary and Secondary Education: School Curriculum & Policies
97	Kendall, Will	Mark Batinick	Republican	2015	Member: Aging; Appropriations-Higher Education; Business & Occupational Licenses; Business Incentives for Local Communities; Construction Industry & Code Enforcement; Insurance: Health & Life; Personnel & Pensions
98	Will	Natalie A. Manley	Democratic	2013	Chair: Cost Benefit Analysis; Member: Appropriations-Human Services; Business & Occupational Licenses; Elections & Campaign Finance; Financial Institutions; Health Care Licenses; Mental Health; Transportation: Regulation, Roads
99	Sangamon	Sara Wojcicki Jimenez	Republican	2015	Member: Agriculture & Conservation; Appropriations-Higher Education; Mental Health; Museums, Arts, & Cultural Enhancement; State Government Administration
100	Calhoun, Greene, Jersey, Macoupin, Madison, Morgan, Pike, Sangamon, Scott	C.D. Davidsmeyer	Republican	2012	Member: Appropriations-Higher Education; Economic Justice & Equity; Energy; Financial Institutions; Insurance: Health & Life; Public Utilities
101	Champaign, DeWitt, Macon, McLean, Piatt	Bill Mitchell	Republican	1999	Member: Elementary and Secondary Education: School Curriculum & Policies; Energy; Environment; Insurance: Property & Casualty; Public Utilities
102	Champaign, Douglas, Edgar, Macon, Moultrie, Shelby, Vermilion	Brad Halbrook	Republican	2012	Member: Agriculture & Conservation; Cities & Villages; Counties & Townships; Elections & Campaign Finance; Government Consolidation & Modernization; Government Transparency
103	Champaign	Carol Ammons	Democratic	2015	Member: Appropriations-Elementary & Secondary Education; Economic Justice & Equity; Elections & Campaign Finance; Environment; Higher Education; Personnel & Pensions
104	Champaign, Vermilion	Chad Hays	Republican	2010	Member: Community College Access & Affordability; Public Utilities; Environment; Executive; Insurance: Property & Casualty
104	Champaign, Vermilion	Michael T. Marron	Republican	2018	Member: Community College Access & Affordability; Environment; Insurance: Property & Casualty
105	Livingston, McLean	Dan Brady	Republican	2001	Member: Appropriations-Higher Education; Elections & Campaign Finance; Higher Education; Insurance: Health & Life; Insurance: Property & Casualty; Rules; Special Needs Services
106	Ford, Iroquois, Livingston, Vermilion, Woodford	Thomas M. Bennett	Republican	2015	Member: Appropriations-Elementary & Secondary Education; Counties & Townships; Elementary and Secondary Education: School Curriculum & Policies; Higher Education; Labor & Commerce
107	Bond, Clinton, Effingham, Fayette, Marion	John Cavaletto	Republican	2009	Member: Appropriations-Elementary & Secondary Education; Cost Benefit Analysis; Elementary and Secondary Education: Licensing, Administration & Oversight; Energy; Environment; Fire & Emergency Services; Government Transparency
108	Clinton, Madison, St. Clair, Washington	Charles Meier	Republican	2013	Member: Agriculture & Conservation; Appropriations-Human Services; Elementary and Secondary Education: School Curriculum & Policies; Environment; Labor & Commerce; Mental Health; Special Needs Services
109	Clay, Edwards, Effingham, Jasper, Lawrence, Richland, Wabash, Wayne, White	David B. Reis	Republican	2005	Member: Appropriations-Public Safety; Business & Occupational Licenses; Business Incentives for Local Communities; Community College Access & Affordability; Executive; Financial Institutions; Insurance: Health & Life
110	Clark, Coles, Crawford, Cumberland, Edgar, Lawrence	Reginald Phillips	Republican	2015	Member: Appropriations-Higher Education; Construction Industry & Code Enforcement; Higher Education; Labor & Commerce
111	Jersey, Madison	Daniel V. Beiser	Democratic	2004	Chair: Environment; Member: Labor & Commerce; Public Utilities
111	Jersey, Madison	Monica Bristow	Democratic	2017	Member: Economic Opportunity; Health Care Licenses; Mental Health; Transportation: Regulation, Roads
112	Madison, St. Clair	Katie Stuart	Democratic	2017	Member: Business Incentives for Local Communities; Elections & Campaign Finance; Elementary and Secondary Education: Licensing, Administration & Oversight; Government Transparency; Higher Education
113	Madison, St. Clair	Jay Hoffman	Democratic	1991	Chair: Labor & Commerce; Member: Appropriations-Public Safety; Judiciary - Civil; Public Utilities
114	St. Clair	LaToya Greenwood	Democratic	2017	Member: Appropriations-Elementary & Secondary Education; Business Incentives for Local Communities; Community College Access & Affordability; Counties & Townships; Financial Institutions; Police & First Responders
115	Jackson, Jefferson, Perry, Union, Washington	Terri Bryant	Republican	2015	Member: Aging; Health Care Licenses; Higher Education; Human Services; Judiciary - Criminal; Tourism, Hospitality & Craft Industries
116	Monroe, Perry, Randolph, St. Clair	Jerry Costello II	Democratic	2011	Chair: Agriculture & Conservation; Member: Appropriations-Public Safety; Environment; Police & First Responders; Veterans' Affairs
117	Franklin, Hamilton, Williamson	Dave Severin	Republican	2017	Member: Agriculture & Conservation; Appropriations-Elementary & Secondary Education; Appropriations-Human Services; Business Incentives for Local Communities; Mental Health; Tourism, Hospitality & Craft Industries
118	Alexander, Gallatin, Hamilton, Hardin, Jackson, Johnson, Massac, Pope, Pulaski, Saline, Union	Brandon W. Phelps	Democratic	2003	Chair: Public Utilities; Member: Energy; Appropriations-Higher Education; Environment; Health Care Licenses; Labor & Commerce
118	Alexander, Gallatin, Hamilton, Hardin, Jackson, Johnson, Massac, Pope, Pulaski, Saline, Union	Natalie Phelps Finnie	Democratic	2017	Member: Agriculture & Conservation; Government Transparency; Police & First Responders; Veterans' Affairs

== See also ==
- List of Illinois state legislatures
