= 2014 Illinois Senate election =

Illinois Senate elections, 2014
- November 4, 2014

19 of 59 total seats in the Illinois Senate 30 seats needed for a majority
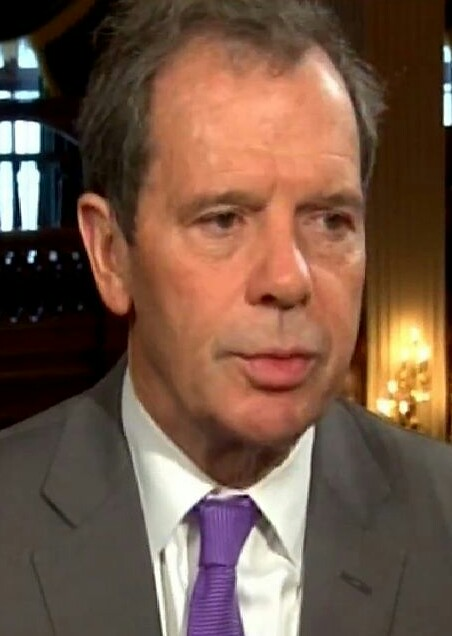

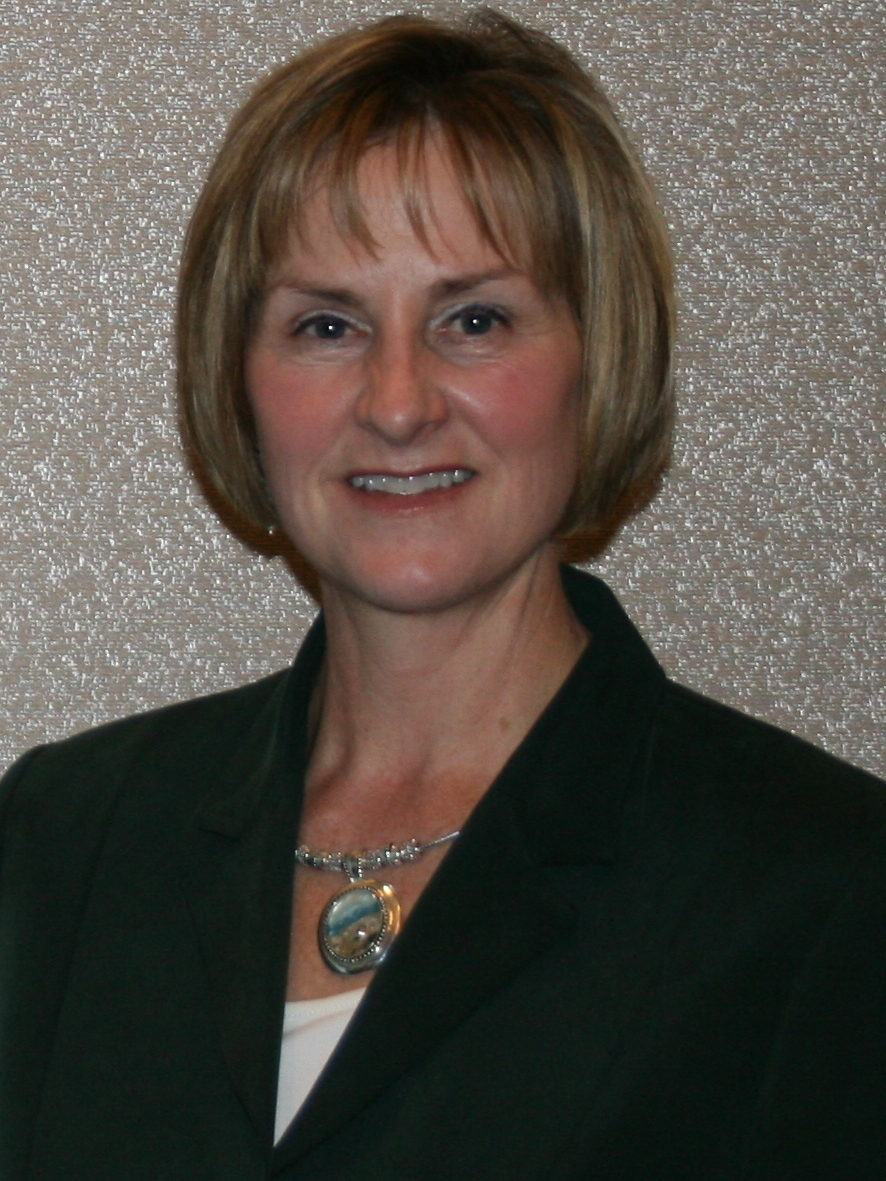
	Majority party	Minority party
Leader	John Cullerton	Christine Radogno
Party	Democratic	Republican
Leader's seat	6th-Chicago	41st-La Grange
Last election	40	19
Seats won	39	20
Seat change	▼1	▲1
Popular vote	476,373	569,414
Percentage	45.55%	54.45%
Swing	▼10.08%	▲10.08%
- Republican gain Democratic hold Republican hold No election 50–60% 60–70% >90% 50–60% 60–70% >90%
President before election
John Cullerton
Democratic
President-Elect
John Cullerton
Democratic

The Illinois State Senate Election of 2014 determined, along with 40 senators not up for re-election, the membership of the 99th Illinois State Senate. The Democratic Party retained its majority, losing one seat with defeat of Mike Jacobs of East Moline by Neil Anderson.

Despite winning a majority of the votes cast in this election, the Republicans remained in the minority, even within the Class of Senators elected this year. There was no possibility of control of the chamber changing hands. Each party only ran 13 candidates, and for control of the Senate to have passed to the Republican Party, it would have to have won eighteen seats of the 19 elected in this election.

== Overview ==
Illinois State Senate Elections, 2014
Party	Votes	Percentage	% change	Previous Senate			Candidates	Elected	Total seats	+/–
Party	Votes	Percentage	% change	Seats held over	Seats up	Total Seats before election	Candidates	Elected	Total seats	+/–
Democratic	476,373	45.55%	▼10.08%	28	12	40	13	11	39	▼1
Republican	569,414	54.45%	▲10.08%	12	7	19	13	8	20	▲1
Totals	1,045,787	100.00%	N/A	40	19	59	26	19	59	—

== Predictions ==
Source	Ranking	As of
Governing	Safe D	October 20, 2014

== General election ==
District	Party	Incumbent	Status	Party	Candidate	Votes	%
3	Democratic	Mattie Hunter		Democratic	Mattie Hunter	43,662	100.00%
6	Democratic	John J. Cullerton		Democratic	John J. Cullerton	39,851	66.26%
6	Democratic	John J. Cullerton		Republican	Stefanie Linares	20,291	33.74%
9	Democratic	Daniel Biss		Democratic	Daniel Biss	55,986	100.00%
12	Democratic	Steven Landek		Democratic	Steven Landek	24,886	100.00%
15	Democratic	Napoleon Harris		Democratic	Napoleon Harris	49,577	100.00%
18	Democratic	Bill Cunningham		Democratic	Bill Cunningham	41,515	58.33%
18	Democratic	Bill Cunningham		Republican	Shaun Colin Murphy	29,658	41.67%
21	Republican	Michael G. Connelly		Republican	Michael G. Connelly	61,393	100.00%
24	Republican	Chris Nybo		Republican	Chris Nybo	47,590	60.28%
24	Republican	Chris Nybo		Democratic	Suzanne Glowiak	31,357	39.72%
27	Republican	Matt Murphy		Republican	Matt Murphy	55,928	100.00%
30	Democratic	Terry Link		Democratic	Terry Link	26,387	59.22%
30	Democratic	Terry Link		Republican	Don Wilson	18,169	40.78%
33	Republican	Karen McConnaughay		Republican	Karen McConnaughay	54,104	100.00%
36	Democratic	Mike Jacobs		Republican	Neil Anderson	35,895	54.27%
36	Democratic	Mike Jacobs		Democratic	Mike Jacobs	30,242	45.72%
39	Democratic	Don Harmon		Democratic	Don Harmon	39,526	100.00%
42	Democratic	Linda Holmes		Democratic	Linda Holmes	28,358	100.00%
45	Republican	Tim Bivins		Republican	Tim Bivins	59,856	100.00%
48	Democratic	Andy Manar		Democratic	Andy Manar	34,402	55.62%
48	Democratic	Andy Manar		Republican	Linda Little	27,449	44.38%
51	Republican	Chapin Rose		Republican	Chapin Rose	69,665	100.00%
54	Republican	Kyle McCarter		Republican	Kyle McCarter	60,923	100.00%
57	Democratic	James Clayborne, Jr.		Democratic	James Clayborne, Jr.	30,624	51.81%
57	Democratic	James Clayborne, Jr.		Republican	Katherine Ruocco	28,486	48.19%
