= John J. Fisher Jr. =

American civil servant and former politician

Member of the Illinois Senate from the 21st district
- In office January 7, 2019 – January 9, 2019
- Preceded by: Michael Connelly
- Succeeded by: Laura Ellman

Personal details
- Party: Republican

John J. Fisher Jr. is a former state senator for Illinois's 21 legislative district for the 100th Illinois General Assembly. Fisher was a contestant on the game show Jeopardy! winning three games in July, 2024.

== State senator ==
Fisher was appointed by the Illinois state senate Republican caucus to succeed Michael Connelly as state senator for Illinois's 21 legislative district for the 100th Illinois General Assembly on January 7, 2019. He served as a member of the Republican Party. Fisher said he was only in office for 22 hours and believes he is the shortest-serving state senator.

== On Jeopardy! ==
Fisher was a contestant and three-day champion on season 40 of Jeopardy!, where he used the name Jay Fisher. Fisher played in the 2025 Jeopardy! Champions Wildcard tournament, where he advanced to the semi-final round, before finishing third in his game.

=== Regular season winnings ===
Game	Air date	Winnings	Combined winnings	Notes	Ref.
1	July 16, 2024	$1,799		Defeated nine-day champion Isaac Hirsch	
2	July 17, 2024	$14,400	$16,199		
3	July 18, 2024	$12,001	$28,200		
4	July 19, 2024	$5,401	$31,200	Came in second place to eventual 2025 Tournament of Champions winner Neilesh Vinjamuri and received $3,000 consolation prize	
