= 2016 Illinois Senate election =

2016 Illinois Senate elections
- November 8, 2016

40 of 59 seats in the Illinois Senate 30 seats needed for a majority
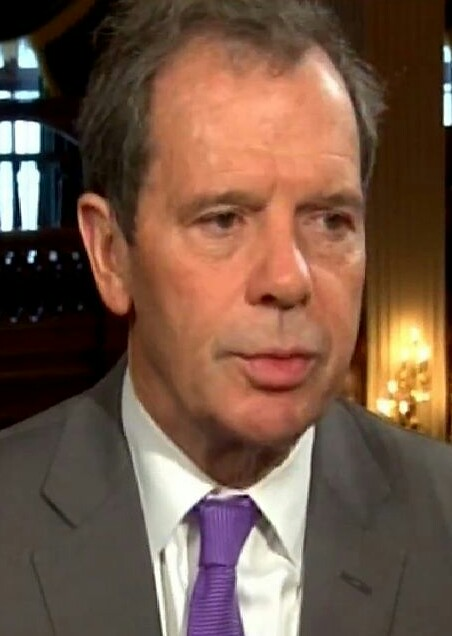

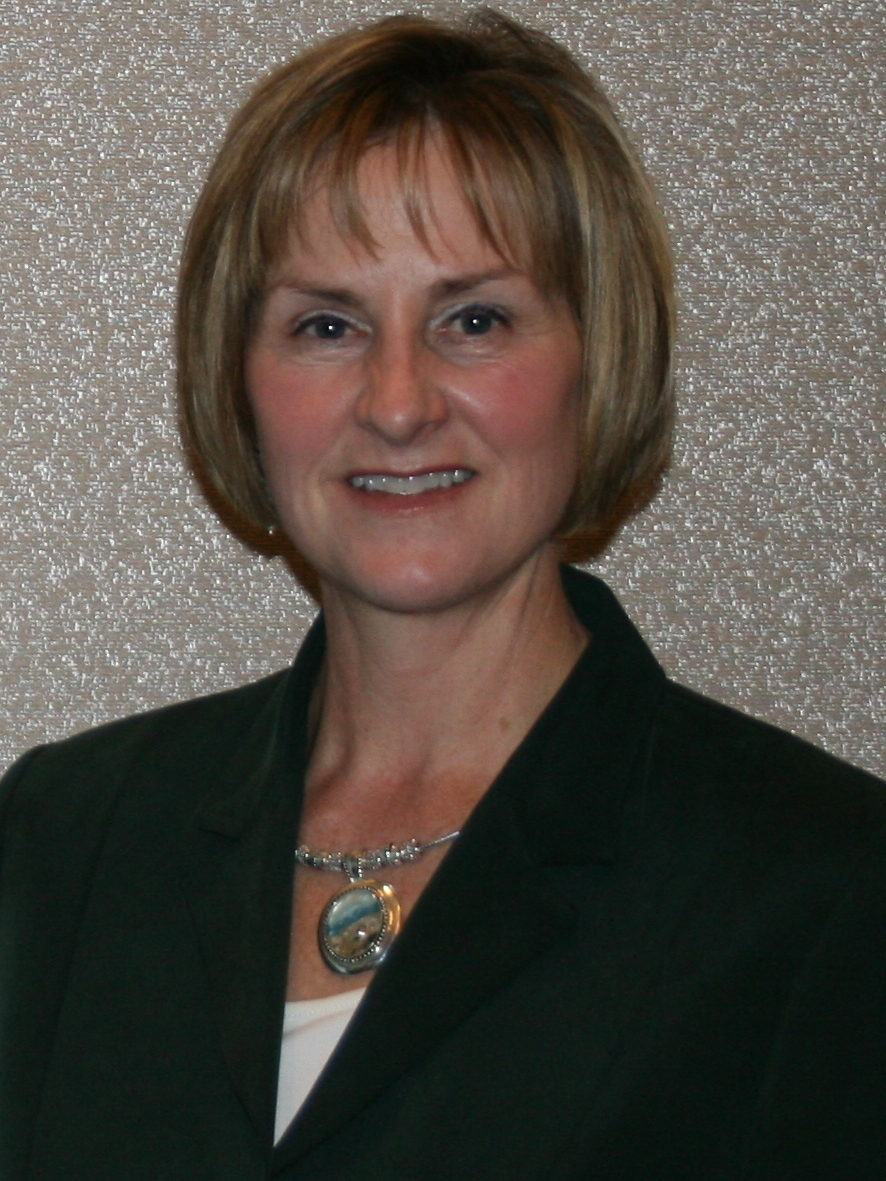
	Majority party	Minority party
Leader	John Cullerton	Christine Radogno
Party	Democratic	Republican
Leader's seat	6th-Chicago	41st-La Grange
Last election	39	20
Seats won	37	22
Seat change	▼2	▲2
Popular vote	1,906,007	1,299,861
Percentage	59.45%	40.55%
Swing	▲13.90%	▼13.90%
- Republican gain Democratic hold Republican hold No election 50–60% 60–70% >90% 50–60% 60–70% >90%
President before election
John Cullerton
Democratic
President-Elect
John Cullerton
Democratic

The Illinois State Senate Election of 2016 determined, along with 19 senators not up for re-election, the membership of the 100th Illinois State Senate. The Democratic Party retained its majority, losing two seats - the 47th district in Western Illinois, and the 59th in the State's South - which were both won by Republicans.

== Overview ==
Illinois State Senate Elections, 2016
Party	Votes	Percentage	% change	Previous Senate			Candidates	Elected	Total seats	+/–
Party	Votes	Percentage	% change	Seats held over	Seats up	Total Seats before election	Candidates	Elected	Total seats	+/–
Democratic	1,906,007	59.45%	▲13.90%	11	28	39	32	26	37	▼2
Republican	1,299,861	40.55%	▼13.90%	8	12	20	21	14	22	▲2
Write-Ins	125	0.00%	N/A	0	0	0	2	0	0	0
Totals	1,045,787	100.00%	N/A	19	40	59	26	19	59	—

== Predictions ==
Source	Ranking	As of
Governing	Likely D	October 12, 2016

== Elections by district ==
=== District 1 ===
Democratic Primary
Party	Candidate	Votes	%
Democratic	Antonio "Tony" Munoz (incumbent)	30,774	100.0
Total votes		30,774	100.0

=== District 2 ===
Democratic Primary
Party	Candidate	Votes	%
Democratic	Omar Aquino	21,557	52.90
Democratic	Angelica Alfaro	19,193	47.10
Total votes		40,750	100.0

=== District 4 ===
Democratic Primary
Party	Candidate	Votes	%
Democratic	Kimberly A. Lightford (incumbent)	47,805	100.0
Total votes		47,805	100.0

=== District 5 ===
Democratic Primary
Party	Candidate	Votes	%
Democratic	Patricia Van Pelt (incumbent)	33,123	67.85
Democratic	Robert "Bob" Fioretti	15,696	32.15
Total votes		48,819	100.0

=== District 7 ===
Democratic Primary
Party	Candidate	Votes	%
Democratic	Heather A. Steans (incumbent)	49,691	100.0
Total votes		49,691	100.0

=== District 8 ===
Democratic Primary
Party	Candidate	Votes	%
Democratic	Ira I. Silverstein (incumbent)	30,330	100.0
Total votes		30,330	100.0

=== District 10 ===
Democratic Primary
Party	Candidate	Votes	%
Democratic	John G. Mulroe (incumbent)	31,539	100.0
Total votes		31,539	100.0

=== District 11 ===
Democratic Primary
Party	Candidate	Votes	%
Democratic	Martin A. Sandoval (incumbent)	32,628	100.0
Total votes		32,628	100.0

=== District 13 ===
Democratic Primary
Party	Candidate	Votes	%
Democratic	Kwame Raoul (incumbent)	47,391	100.0
Total votes		47,391	100.0

=== District 14 ===
Democratic Primary
Party	Candidate	Votes	%
Democratic	Emil Jones III (incumbent)	49,357	100.0
Total votes		49,357	100.0

=== District 16 ===
Democratic Primary
Party	Candidate	Votes	%
Democratic	Jacqueline "Jacqui" Collins (incumbent)	40,400	100.0
Total votes		40,400	100.0

=== District 17 ===
Democratic Primary
Party	Candidate	Votes	%
Democratic	Donne E. Trotter (incumbent)	49,814	100.0
Total votes		49,814	100.0

Republican Primary
Party	Candidate	Votes	%
Republican	Quintin Barton	2	100.0
Total votes		2	100.0

=== District 19 ===
Democratic Primary
Party	Candidate	Votes	%
Democratic	Michael E. Hastings (incumbent)	32,084	81.11
Democratic	McStephen O.A. "Max" Solomon	7,474	18.89
Total votes		39,558	100.0

=== District 20 ===
Democratic Primary
Party	Candidate	Votes	%
Democratic	Iris Y. Martinez (incumbent)	37,221	100.0
Total votes		37,221	100.0

=== District 22 ===
Democratic Primary
Party	Candidate	Votes	%
Democratic	Cristina Castro	13,887	66.79
Democratic	Steve Caramelli	6,906	33.21
Total votes		20,793	100.0

Republican Primary
Party	Candidate	Votes	%
Republican	Richard Evans	290	100.0
Total votes		290	100.0

=== District 23 ===
Democratic Primary
Party	Candidate	Votes	%
Democratic	Thomas E. Cullerton (incumbent)	22,033	100.0
Total votes		22,033	100.0

Republican Primary
Party	Candidate	Votes	%
Republican	Seth Lewis	21,362	100.0
Total votes		21,362	100.0

=== District 25 ===
Republican Primary
Party	Candidate	Votes	%
Republican	Jim Oberweis (incumbent)	26,944	100.0
Total votes		26,944	100.0

Democratic Primary
Party	Candidate	Votes	%
Democratic	Corinne M. Pierog	19,465	100.0
Total votes		19,465	100.0

=== District 26 ===
Republican Primary
Party	Candidate	Votes	%
Republican	Dan McConchie	13,641	36.58
Republican	Casey Urlacher	12,236	32.81
Republican	Martin McLaughlin	11,418	30.62
Total votes		37,295	100.0

=== District 28 ===
Democratic Primary
Party	Candidate	Votes	%
Democratic	Laura Murphy (incumbent)	24,195	100.0
Total votes		24,195	100.0

Republican Primary
Party	Candidate	Votes	%
Republican	Mel Thillens	17,540	100.0
Total votes		17,540	100.0

=== District 29 ===
Democratic Primary
Party	Candidate	Votes	%
Democratic	Julie A. Morrison (incumbent)	28,609	100.0
Total votes		28,609	100.0

Republican Primary
Party	Candidate	Votes	%
Republican	Benjamin Salzberg	16,218	100.0
Total votes		16,218	100.0

=== District 31 ===
Democratic Primary
Party	Candidate	Votes	%
Democratic	Melinda Bush (incumbent)	22,487	100.0
Total votes		22,487	100.0

Republican Primary
Party	Candidate	Votes	%
Republican	Michael Amrozowicz	18,039	100.0
Total votes		18,039	100.0
