= Laura Ellman =

American politician

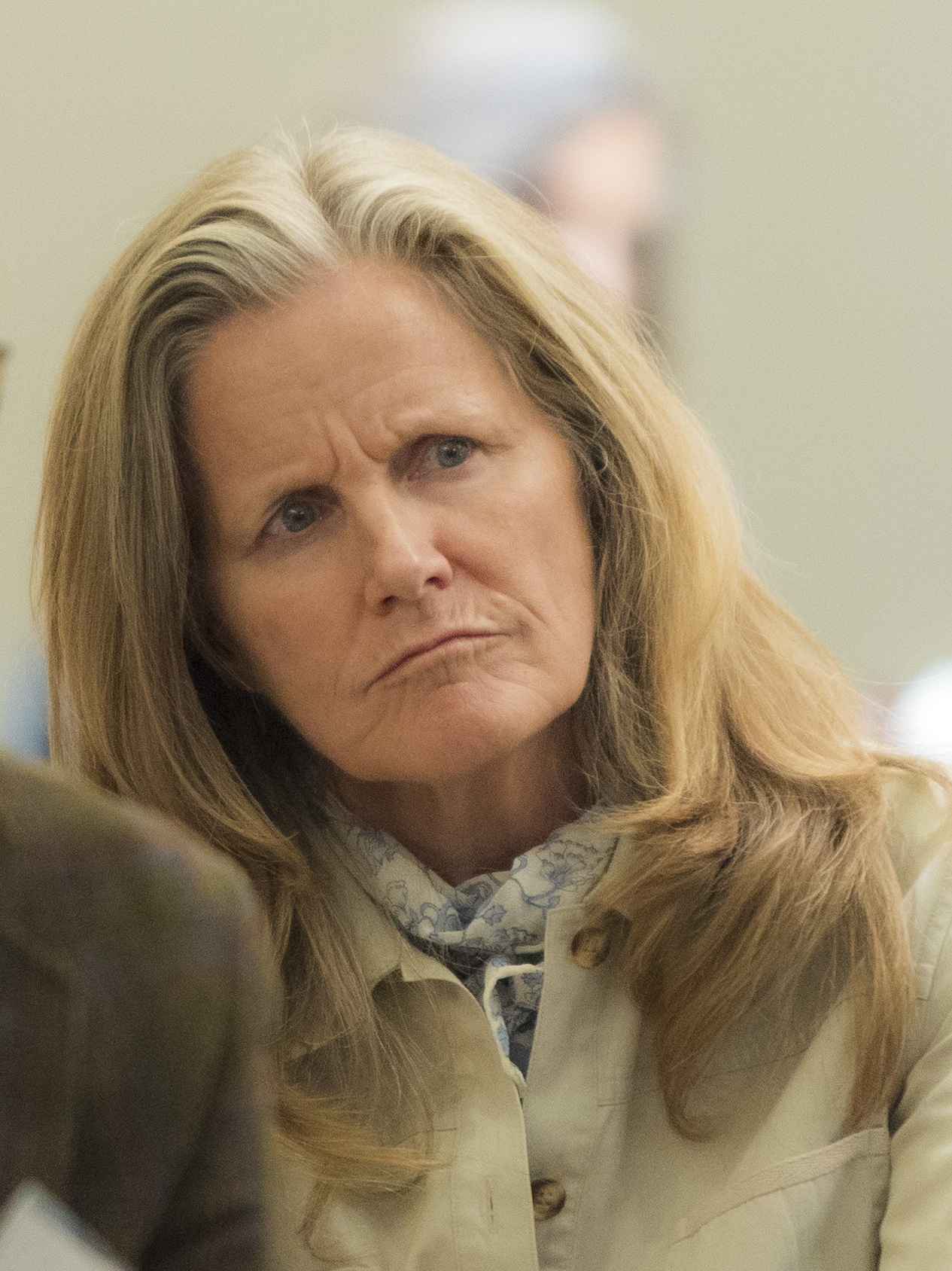
- Ellman in 2025

Member of the Illinois Senate from the 21st district
- Incumbent
- Assumed office January 9, 2019
- Preceded by: John J. Fisher Jr.

Personal details
- Party: Democratic
- Education: Grinnell College (BS); University of Iowa (MS)

Laura Ellman is a Democratic member of the Illinois Senate for the 21st district. The district, located in the Chicago metropolitan area includes all or parts of Bolingbrook, Downers Grove, Glen Ellyn, Lisle, Lombard, Naperville, Warrenville, and Wheaton.

== Career ==
Ellman defeated incumbent Republican Senator Michael Connelly in the 2018 Illinois general election by 1179 votes. Connelly resigned in December 2018 and was replaced by John J. Fisher Jr. for a day in January 2019. Ellman, a senior independent assessor at Argonne National Laboratory, has a degree in mathematics from Grinnell College and a masters in applied statistics from the University of Iowa.

As of July 2022, Senator Ellman is a member of the following Illinois Senate committees:

- Agriculture Committee (SAGR)
- (Chairwoman of) Appropriations - Revenue and Finance Committee (SAPP-SARF)
- Energy and Public Utilities Committee (SENE)
- (Chairwoman of) Financial Institutions Committee (SFIC)
- Higher Education Committee (SCHE)
- (Chairwoman of) Next Generation of Energy Committee (SENE-ENGE)
- Redistricting - DuPage County Committee (SRED-SRDC)
- (Chairwoman of) Subcommittee on Next Generation Nuclear (SENE-SNGN)
- Transportation Committee (STRN)
