= Ron Sandack =

American politician

Ronald Sandack

Member of the Illinois House of Representatives from the 81st district
- In office January 9, 2013 – July 25, 2016
- Preceded by: Renée Kosel (redistricted)
- Succeeded by: David S. Olsen

Member of the Illinois Senate from the 21st district
- In office November 30, 2010 – January 9, 2013
- Preceded by: Daniel Cronin
- Succeeded by: Michael Connelly

Personal details
- Party: Republican
- Spouse: Kevan
- Children: 2
- Education: University of Illinois (BA); DePaul University (JD)
- Occupation: Lawyer

Ronald "Ron" Sandack was a Republican member of the Illinois House of Representatives, representing the 81st district from 2013 to 2016. Prior to his appointment Sandack was the Mayor of Downers Grove, Illinois, where he served from 2007 to 2011.

== Early life and career ==
He received his Bachelor of Arts from the University of Illinois at Urbana-Champaign in 1986 and his Juris Doctor from DePaul University College of Law in 1989. Prior to his election as mayor, Sandack served on the Downers Grove Village Council. His service to Downers Grove began in 2001 with his appointment to the Village Liquor Commission. Sandack is married with two children.

== Illinois General Assembly ==
Sandack was appointed to the Illinois Senate in 2010, replacing Daniel Cronin who resigned his position to become the chairman of the DuPage County Board.

From 2013 until his resignation, he was a member of the Illinois House of Representatives. Sandack was the Republican House floor leader and was known for being outspoken on social media, and was a strong supporter of Governor Bruce Rauner.

Sandack abruptly resigned from the Illinois House of Representatives on July 24, 2016, citing "cyber-security issues", claiming that he had found several fake social media accounts that were set up in his name. Downers Grove Republican David Olsen was appointed to fill Sandack's unexpired term and to take his place on the ballot in the November 2016 elections. Sandack's resignation was effective July 25, 2021. Local Republican leaders met and appointed Olsen to the seat. Olsen was sworn into office July 30, 2016.

Sandack served as an Illinois co-chair for the John Kasich's 2016 presidential campaign.
