= Michael W. Tryon =

American politician

Member of the Illinois House of Representatives from the 66th district
- In office January 2013 – January 11, 2017
- Preceded by: David Harris (redistricted)
- Succeeded by: Allen Skillicorn

Member of the Illinois House of Representatives from the 64th district
- In office January 2005 – January 2013
- Preceded by: Rosemary Kurtz
- Succeeded by: Barbara Wheeler

Chairman of the McHenry County Board
- In office 1998–2004

Personal details
- Born: July 30, 1955 (age 71) Terre Haute, Indiana, U.S.
- Party: Republican
- Spouse: Cathy
- Children: 3
- Education: Indiana State University
- Profession: Environmental Consultant

Michael W. Tryon (born July 30, 1955) was a Republican member of the Illinois House of Representatives, representing the 66th district from 2013 to 2017 and the 64th district from 2005 to 2013. Previously, he served on the McHenry County Board from 1989 to 2004 and held the leadership position of County Board Chairman from 1998 to 2004.

== Biography ==
A native of Terre Haute, Indiana, Tryon graduated from North Vigo High School in 1973. Tryon then went on to graduate from Indiana State University in 1978, where he earned a B.S. in Environmental Health Science.

Tryon moved to McHenry County, Illinois in 1977 to take a job with the McHenry County Health Department. Tryon took a job in the private sector in 1980 and founded a water treatment testing lab in 1986. In 1988, Tryon was elected to the McHenry County Board, and in 1998 his fellow board members elected him Chairman of the County Board. Tryon remained chairman until his election to the Illinois House of Representatives in 2004.

Tryon served as Chairman of the McHenry County chapter of the Republican Party from 2008 to 2014.

Tryon was first elected to the Illinois House of Representatives in the 2004 election and took office in January 2005. He authored 70 pieces of legislation that became law during his tenure as state representative. In June 2015, Tryon announced that he would not run for re-election in 2016, citing his support for term limits for elected officials as a reason.

Tryon was one of only five Illinois representatives to vote against the Illinois Right to Vote Amendment on its passage in the Illinois House of Representatives. The bill subsequently was passed unanimously in the Illinois Senate, and was approved as a constitutional amendment by the voters of Illinois.

=== Committee assignments in the Illinois House (98th General Assembly) ===
- Energy (Republican Spokesperson)
- Business Growth & Incentives; Environment (Republican Spokesperson)
- Executive; Mass Transit (Republican Spokesperson)
- Appropriations-Public Safety

== Personal life ==
Tryon is married to Cathy Tryon and they have three children together.

Tryon plays in a band that includes himself, as well as fellow Illinois legislators Chad Hays and Don Harmon.
