= Michael Connelly (Illinois politician) =

American politician

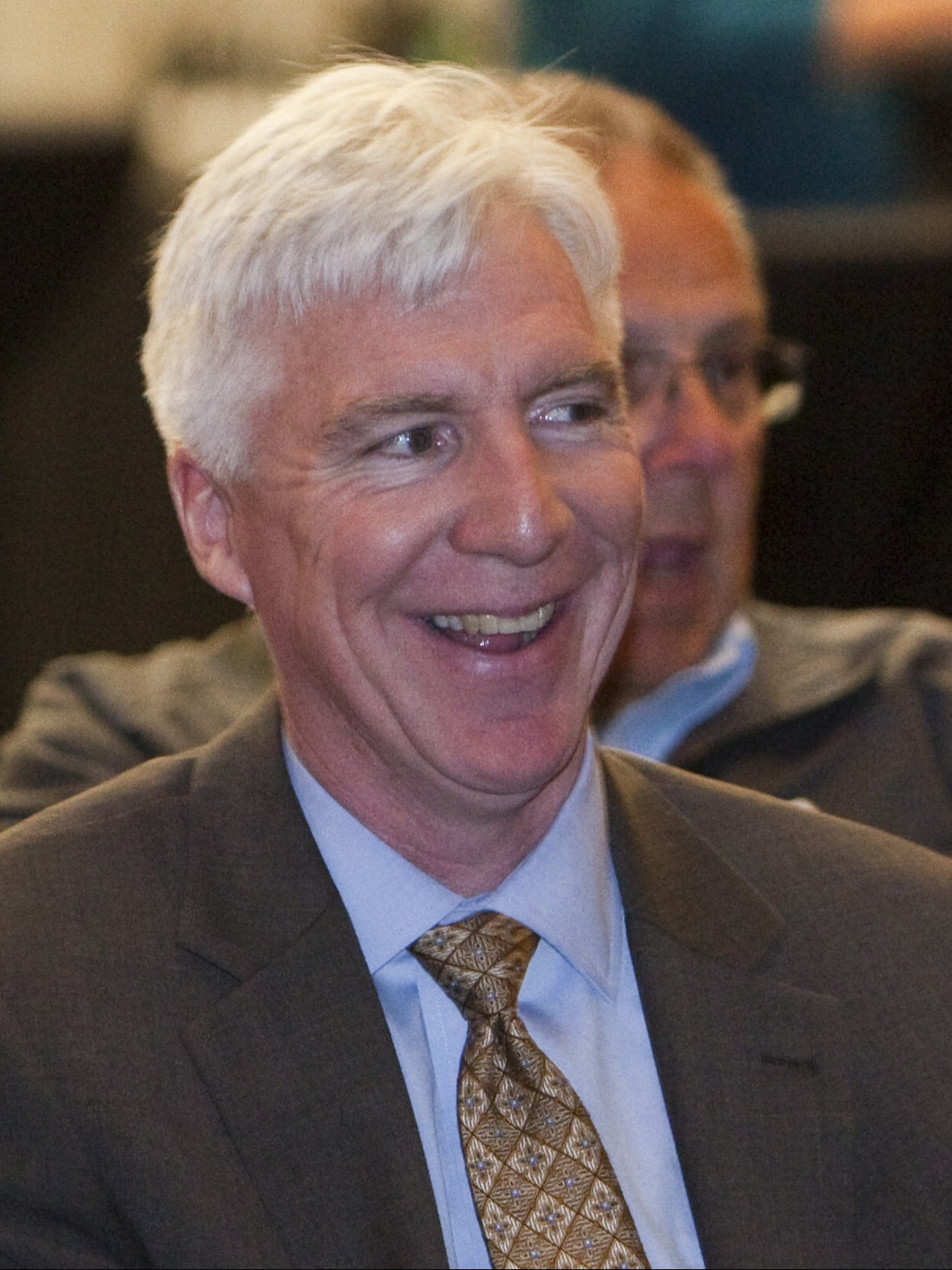
- Connelly at College of DuPage in 2014

Member of the Illinois Senate from the 21st district
- In office January 9, 2013 – December 21, 2018
- Preceded by: Ron Sandack (redistricted)
- Succeeded by: John J. Fisher Jr.

Member of the Illinois House of Representatives from the 48th district
- In office January 14, 2009 – January 9, 2013
- Preceded by: James H. Meyer
- Succeeded by: Sandra M. Pihos

Member of the DuPage County Board from the 5th district
- In office December 2006 – January 14, 2009
- Preceded by: Robert Heap
- Succeeded by: John Zediker

Personal details
- Party: Republican
- Spouse: Lisa Connelly
- Children: 3
- Education: Loyola University (BA); John Marshall Law School (JD)
- Profession: Attorney

Michael G. Connelly is a former Republican member of the Illinois Senate, representing the 21st district, from 2013 to 2018. He previously served in the Illinois House of Representatives from 2009 to 2012.

== Political career ==
Connelly served as a Lisle village trustee from 2001 to 2006 as well as sittinggon in theLIstle Township Republican Committee. In 2006, he was elected to the DuPage County Board, representing the 5th district. He won the Republican primary in 2006 after incumbent Robert Heap ran for county treasurer. He was succeeded by John Zediker on the Board.

In 2008, he was elected to the Illinois House of Representatives, representing the 48th district.

In 2012, he was elected to the Illinois Senate, representing the 21st district. While in the Senate, Connelly served as the Assistant Minority Leader. In 2018, he lost reelection to Democratic candidate Laura Ellman by a margin of 1179 votes. He resigned on December 21, 2018, and John J. Fisher Jr. was appointed his successor for a day in January 2019.

== Personal life ==
Connelly was born in Chicago and raised in La Grange. He graduated from Loyola University in 1986 and the John Marshall Law School in 1989. Connelly previously served as an assistant State's Attorney in Cook County and as a law clerk to Justice Allan Stouder of the Illinois Appellate Court. He has been in the private practice of law for over 20 years.

Connelly and his wife, Lisa, have three children.
