= David S. Olsen =

American politician

David Olsen
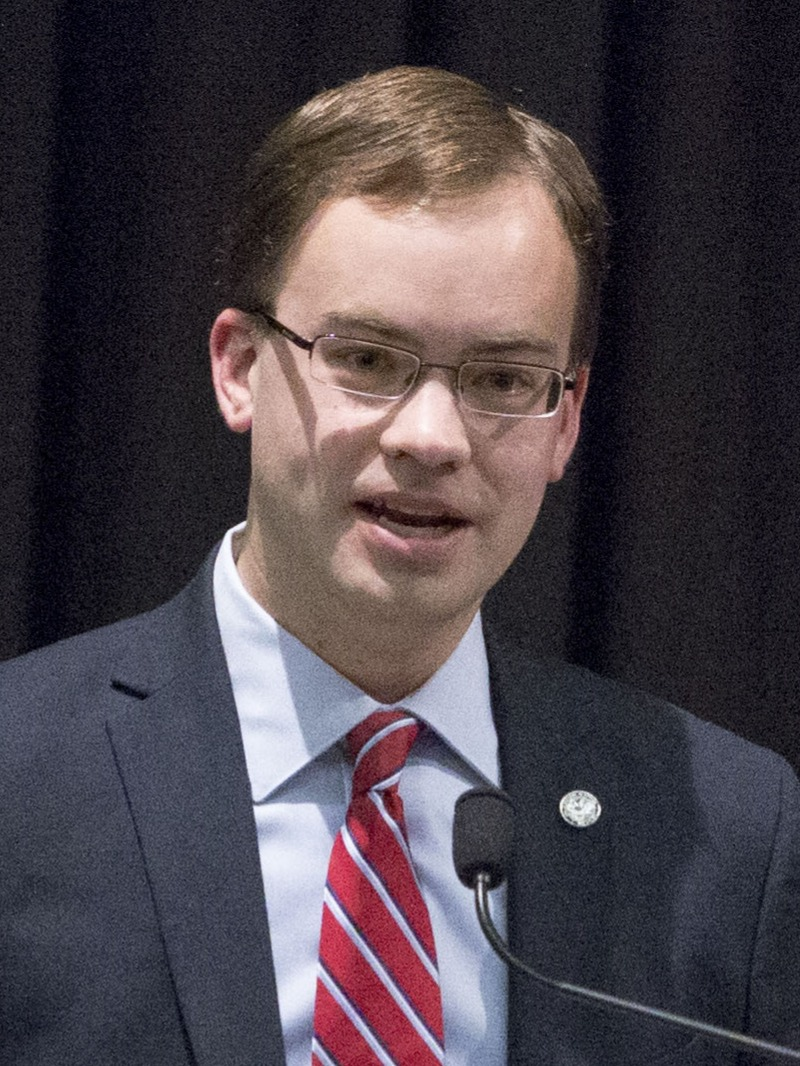
- Olsen speaking at College of DuPage in 2017

Member of the Illinois House of Representatives from the 81st district
- In office July 30, 2016 – January 9, 2019
- Preceded by: Ron Sandack
- Succeeded by: Anne Stava-Murray

Personal details
- Born: September 13, 1988 (age 38)
- Party: Republican
- Education: University of Illinois (B.A.)
- Profession: Politician
- Website: Official website

David S. Olsen (born September 13, 1988) was a Republican member of the Illinois House of Representatives from 2016 to 2019.

Republican incumbent Ron Sandack resigned from the Illinois House of Representatives effective July 25, 2016. Local Republican leaders met and appointed Olsen to the seat. Olsen was sworn into office on July 30, 2016.

In 2018, Olsen narrowly lost reelection to Democratic candidate Anne Stava-Murray. In 2019, Olsen ran for mayor of Downers Grove but lost. He was also vice chair of the College of DuPage board of trustees, appointed in 2016 by Illinois Community College board chairman Lazaro Lopez.
