= Barbara Wheeler =

American politician

Member of the Illinois House of Representatives from the 64th district
- In office January 9, 2013 – January 9, 2019
- Preceded by: Michael W. Tryon
- Succeeded by: Tom Weber

Personal details
- Born: 1967 or 1968 Lake County, Illinois
- Party: Republican
- Spouse: Joe Wheeler
- Children: 5
- Education: Loyola University Chicago, National Louis University
- Profession: Teacher, politician

Barbara Wheeler (born in 1967 or 1968) was a Republican member of the Illinois House of Representatives, representing the 64th district from 2013 to 2019. The district contained parts of Lake County and McHenry County.

== Early life ==
Wheeler was a Peace Corps volunteer. She received education degrees from Loyola University Chicago and National Louis University, and worked as a teacher at Wauconda Middle School. She moved to Crystal Lake in 1998.

== Political career ==
Wheeler served on the McHenry County Board from 2002 to 2012. In 2012 she was elected to the Illinois House of Representatives in the newly redrawn 64th district. She faced no opposition in the primary or general elections.

Wheeler did not run for re-election in 2018.
