= Andy Manar =

American politician

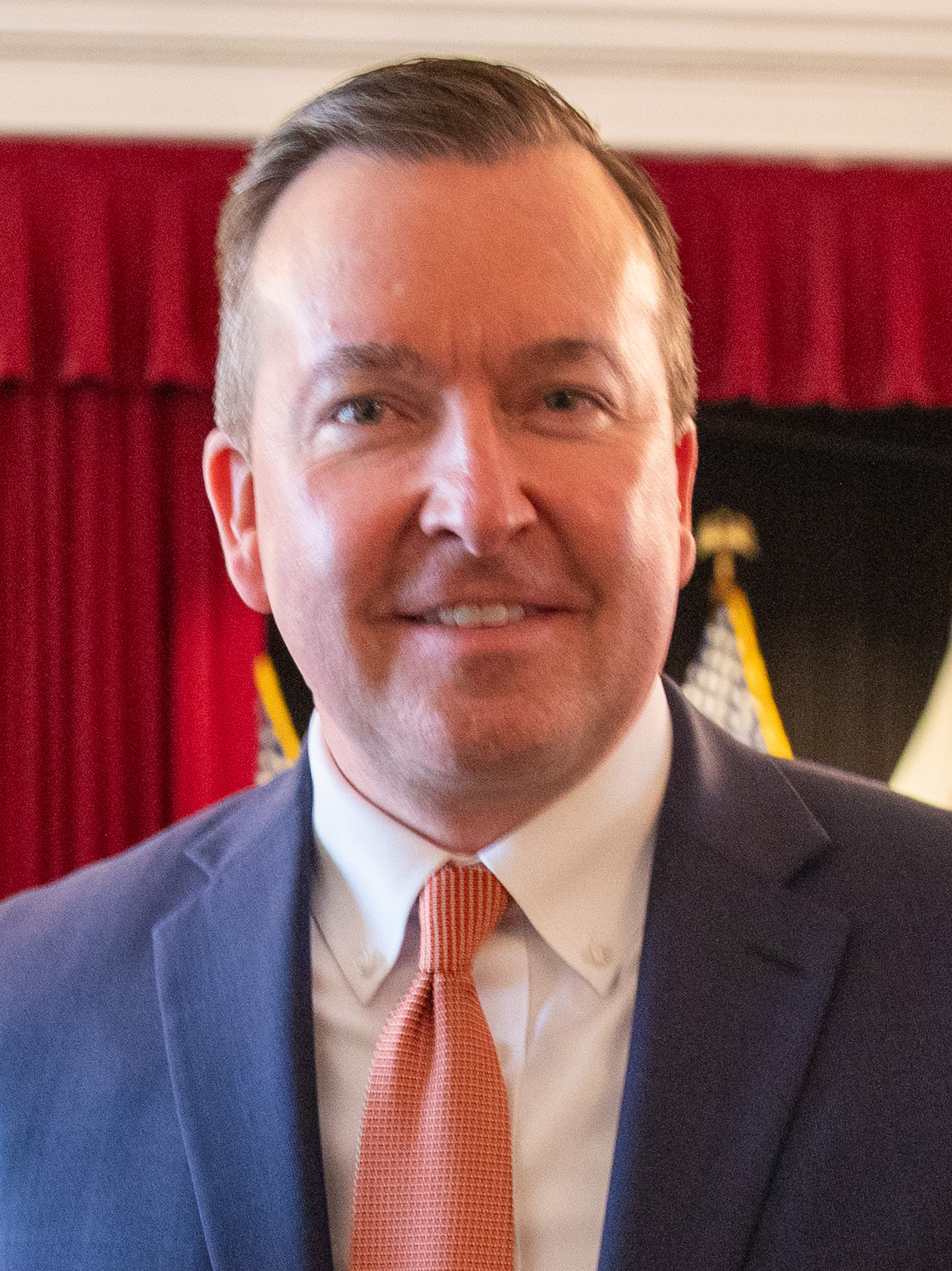
- Manar in 2025

Member of the Illinois Senate from the 48th district
- In office January 9, 2013 – January 17, 2021
- Preceded by: Tom Johnson (redistricted)
- Succeeded by: Doris Turner

Chair of the Macoupin County Board
- In office December 2004 – December 2012
- Preceded by: Don Denby
- Succeeded by: Mark Dragovich

Personal details
- Born: November 15, 1975 (age 50) Bunker Hill, Illinois, U.S.
- Party: Democratic
- Spouse: Trista
- Children: 3
- Education: Southern Illinois University, Edwardsville (BA)

Andrew "Andy" Manar (born November 15, 1975) is a former Democratic member of the Illinois Senate. He represented the 48th district, including part or all of Christian, Macon, Macoupin, Madison, Montgomery, and Sangamon counties. Andy Manar is known for being the chief advocate for SB 1947, which made dramatic reforms to Illinois’ education funding formula. Prior to his service in the Illinois Senate, he was chairman of the Macoupin County Board from 2003 to 2012.

On January 4, 2021 Manar announced that he would be stepping down from the State Senate to assume a role in the administration of J. B. Pritzker. On June 17, 2021 it was announced that Manar would become Deputy Governor in the Pritzker Administration, taking over for Dan Hynes.

== Early life and education ==
Born and raised in Macoupin County, Andy Manar grew up in Bunker Hill. He went to Bunker Hill Community High School where he learned first hand the importance of strong downstate schools.

Manar credits his strong roots in public service to the late Senator Vince Demuzio who became his mentor at age 18. Manar learned about phenomenal public service through an unpaid internship working for the Senator's district office helping constituents.

Manar attended Southern Illinois University at Edwardsville where he was a Golden Apple Scholar studying History to become a certified teacher. Manar still maintains his teaching certification. In 1997, Manar was elected to the Bunker Hill City Council. In 2001, he was elected Mayor. During his tenure he oversaw the construction of an 18-acre city park, the city’s largest sidewalk replacement project, and housing for low income and senior citizens.

== Macoupin County Board ==
In 2003, Manar left the Mayor’s post to join the Macoupin County Board as its youngest member. After Don Denby retired, Manar was elected Chairman unanimously by his fellow board members in December 2004. During his time as Chairman, Macoupin County lost hundreds of jobs and a significant amount of its tax revenue when two of the county’s three active coal mines closed in 2007 and early 2008. Citing a fiscal crisis, Andy began enacting policies to save taxpayer money and run government on less resources. Under Manar, the Board in 2011 voted unanimously to cut their own pay and reduced the size of the Macoupin County Board by one-third, saving taxpayers more than $40,000 annually. The Board also repealed a costly pension plan that had been in place for elected officials. Manar also shut down the county-run economic development office and helped to create a new collaborative public-private partnership run equally by private business and municipal and county government. In December 2012, Manar stepped down after four terms as the County Board Chairman, in order to transition to the Illinois Senate being succeeded by Mark Dragovich.

== Illinois Senate ==
In September 2011, Manar announced his intention to run for State Senate in the newly-drawn 48th district. In the general election, Manar faced Republican candidate and the late Mayor of Decatur, Mike McElroy. During the campaign, Manar was endorsed by the Illinois AFL-CIO, Citizen Action Illinois, Illinois Education Association, Illinois Fraternal Order of Police, the National Association of Social Workers and the State Journal-Register. Andy Manar won the election with approximately 55% of the vote to Mike McElroy’s 45%.

In his first term, Senator Manar was an active legislator, advocating for bills making it easier for college students to vote, helping charities by allowing the Public Building Commission to rent to not for profit groups, curbing newborn infections of pertussis, rewarding state contracts to businesses that employ Illinois residents, working to reduce the discrepancy in funding for downstate school districts in Illinois and allowing the Central Illinois Economic Development Authority to create Enterprise Zones to create and keep jobs in Central Illinois.

In 2014, Senator Manar won his first race for re-election, defeating Macon County Board member Linda Little of Decatur. Despite depressed turnout, Manar increased his margin of victory compared to his first State Senate race in 2012.

After his resignation, local Democratic leaders selected Springfield Alderwoman Doris Turner to succeed Manar.

=== School funding reform ===
The fall of 2017 brought a monumental policy victory for Downstate Illinois public school students. A four-year effort including Manar's chairmanship of a bipartisan, joint Education Funding Advisory Committee, several bill iterations, and years of town hall meetings across the state, yielded the first overhaul of Illinois' education funding formula since the 1990s.

Amy Ballinger-Cole of Advance Illinois said of the overhaul, “He basically picked a fight that no one else wanted to touch. The face that he got it done in this political environment is nothing short of a miracle.”

=== Recent activity ===
Senator Manar’s Spring 2018 legislative victories include the passage of a bill to provide every school in Illinois with high-speed broadband internet, a package of measures to combat the shortage of qualified substitute teachers in Illinois, and a law which would raise the minimum wage of Illinois teachers from $9,000 per year to $32,000 per year. Outside of the General Assembly chambers, Senator Manar has been active in advocating on behalf of the communities of his district. Andy has publicly advocated to hold the Bruce Rauner administration responsible, including commissioning and publicizing a report revealing the financial mismanagement of state warehouse leasing.

Senator Manar brought together Lewis and Clark Community College and the University of Illinois to establish a Bachelor of Science in Nursing degree program in Godfrey. The program addresses a critical shortage of nurses for area hospitals and healthcare providers while giving students an affordable path to a college degree. Area students will be able to earn a bachelor's degree from the U of I while attending classes locally at LCCC in Godfrey.

In 2018, Governor-elect J. B. Pritzker appointed Manar to the Educational Success transition committee, which is responsible for state education policy. In 2019, Manar along with 39th District Representative Will Guzzardi filed SB667, which would cap insulin costs at $100 a month for diabetic patients in the State of Illinois. Manar said he filed the bill after a teacher in his district talked to him about her struggle to pay for insulin for her diabetic children, and after reading about the State of Colorado's recently passed insulin co-pay cap bill. The bill passed the Illinois General Assembly in November 2019 and was signed into law by Governor J. B. Pritzker on January 24, 2020, with the bill taking effect on January 1, 2021.

=== Committee assignments ===
In the 99th General Assembly, Senator Manar was a member of the following committees; Agriculture, Higher Education, Education, Labor, Appropriations I & II, and the Special Committee on Oversight of Medicaid Managed Care. In the 98th General Assembly, Senator Manar served as the sub-chairperson on the Subcommittee on Economic Development as well as on the Agriculture and Conservation, Executive Appointments, Higher Education, State Government & Veterans Affairs and Appropriations I & II committees. He is currently the only downstate Senator to chair an appropriations committee.

Manar was also a legislative appointee to the Agriculture Export Advisory Committee, Coal Development Board, Flue Gas Desulfurization Task Force, Professional Development Panel, and Illinois Workforce Innovation Board.

== Senior Advisor to the Governor ==
Manar began his new position with Governor J. B. Pritzker's administration on January 19, 2021. Manar said his main objective as a senior advisor would be to help Pritzker with downstate economic revitalization, appropriations, and COVID-19 recovery efforts.

== Election results ==
Illinois State Senate 48th District General Election, 2012
Party	Candidate	Votes	%
Democratic	Andy Manar	47,231	55.29
Republican	Mike McElroy	38,183	44.71
Democratic gain from Republican			

Illinois State Senate 48th District General Election, 2014
Party	Candidate	Votes	%	±%
Democratic	Andy Manar	34,402	55.62	
Republican	Linda Little	27,449	44.71	−0.33%
Turnout		61,851		−27.58
Democratic hold		Swing	+0.33	

Illinois State Senate 48th District General Election, 2018
Party	Candidate	Votes	%	±%
Democratic	Andy Manar	42,068	56.8	
Republican	Seth McMillan	32,021	43.2	−1.51%
Turnout		74,091		
Democratic hold		Swing	+1.18	
