= Karen McConnaughay =

American politician

- McConnaughay in 2016

Member of the Illinois Senate from the 33rd district
- In office January 2013 – July 2018
- Preceded by: New District
- Succeeded by: Don DeWitte

Chairwoman of the Kane County Board
- In office December 2004 – December 2012
- Preceded by: Mike McCoy
- Succeeded by: Chris Lauzen

Personal details
- Born: March 1, 1957 (age 69)
- Party: Republican
- Spouse: John
- Children: 3
- Education: College of DuPage
- Profession: Businesswoman

Karen McConnaughay (born March 1, 1957) is an Illinois politician from Kane County. A Republican, she was a member of the Illinois Senate from the 33rd district from 2013 until her resignation in 2018. The 33rd district includes all or parts of Geneva, St. Charles, West Dundee, Hampshire, Huntley, Carpentersville, Lake in the Hills and Algonquin. A resident of St. Charles, she served as the Kane County Board Chairman from 2004 through 2012 prior to her election to the legislature. Don DeWitte, a former Mayor of St. Charles, Illinois, was appointed by local Republican leaders to succeed her in the Illinois Senate.

On May 4, 2021, Governor J. B. Pritzker appointed McConnaughay to the Illinois State Toll Highway Authority. As of May 27, 2021, her appointment is awaiting confirmation by the Illinois Senate.

During the 2008 Republican Party presidential primaries, McConnaughay ran to be a delegate to the 2008 Republican National Convention from Illinois's 14th congressional district for the presidential campaign of former Governor Mitt Romney.
