= 2008 Illinois Senate election =

Illinois Senate elections, 2008
- November 4, 2008

40 of 59 total seats in the Illinois Senate 30 seats needed for a majority
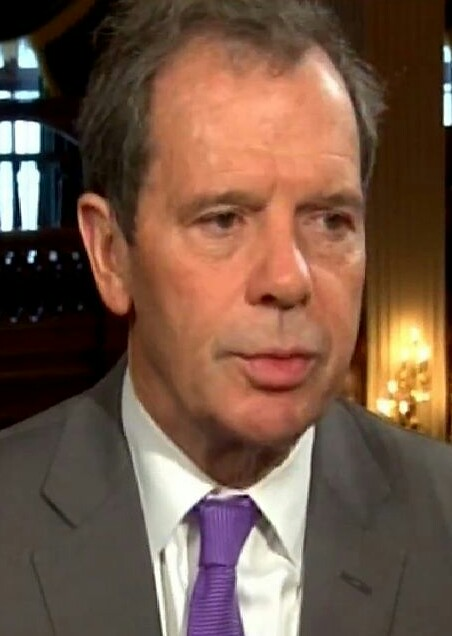

	Majority party	Minority party
Leader	John Cullerton	Frank Watson
Party	Democratic	Republican
Leader's seat	6th-Chicago	51st-Greenville
Last election	37	22
Seats won	37	22
Seat change	Steady	Steady
Popular vote	1,749,517	1,457,074
Percentage	54.22%	45.15%
- Results: Democratic hold Republican hold No election Vote Share: 50–60% 60–70% 70–80% 80–90% >90% 50–60% 60–70% 70–80% >90%
President before election
Emil Jones
Democratic
President-Elect
John Cullerton
Democratic

The Illinois State Senate Election of 2008 determined, along with 19 senators not up for re-election, the membership of the 96th Illinois State Senate. The Democratic Party retained its majority.

== Overview ==
Illinois State Senate Elections, 2008
Party	Votes	Percentage	Seats up	Seats not up	Total seats	+/–
Democratic	1,791,386	54.81%	24	13	37	0
Republican	1,457,074	44.58%	16	6	22	0
Green	19,818	0.61%	0	0	0	0
Independent	116	0.004%	0	0	0	0
Totals	3,268,394	100.00%	40	19	59	—

== Predictions ==
Source	Ranking	As of
Stateline	Likely D	October 15, 2008

== Individual Results ==
The following are results by individual districts.

=== 2nd District ===
Illinois' 2nd State Senate district election, 2008
Party	Candidate	Votes	%
Democratic	William 'Willie' Delgado	42,002	100.00
Total votes		42,002	100.00
Democratic hold			

=== 3rd District ===
Illinois' 3rd State Senate district election, 2008
Party	Candidate	Votes	%
Democratic	Mattie Hunter	53,889	100.00
Total votes		53,889	100.00
Democratic hold			

=== 5th District ===
Illinois' 5th State Senate district election, 2008
Party	Candidate	Votes	%
Democratic	Rickey R. Hendon	69,229	85.97
Republican	Jason Allen Braswell	11,297	14.03
Total votes		80,526	100.00
Democratic hold			

=== 6th District ===
Illinois' 6th State Senate district election, 2008
Party	Candidate	Votes	%
Democratic	John Cullerton	73,323	77.47
Republican	Jay Valko	21,320	22.53
Total votes		94,643	100.00
Democratic hold			

=== 7th District ===
Illinois' 7th State Senate district election, 2008
Party	Candidate	Votes	%
Democratic	Heather Steans	55,457	83.08
Green	Tom Durkin	11,297	16.92
Total votes		66,754	100.00
Democratic hold			

=== 8th District ===
Illinois' 8th State Senate district election, 2008
Party	Candidate	Votes	%
Democratic	Ira I. Silverstein	55,691	100.00
Total votes		55,691	100.00
Democratic hold			

=== 9th District ===
Illinois' 9th State Senate district election, 2008
Party	Candidate	Votes	%
Democratic	Jeffrey Schoenberg	70,746	70.9
Republican	Brendan Appel	29,036	29.1
Total votes		99,782	100.00
Democratic hold			

=== 11th District ===
Illinois' 11th State Senate district election, 2008
Party	Candidate	Votes	%
Democratic	Louis S. Viverito	51,353	70.
Republican	Jeffrey Malinowski	21,213	29.2
Total votes		72,748	100.00
Democratic hold			

=== 12th District ===
Illinois' 12th State Senate district election, 2008
Party	Candidate	Votes	%
Democratic	Martin A. Sandoval	33,807	100.00
Total votes		33,807	100.00
Democratic hold			

=== 14th District ===
Illinois' 14th State Senate district election, 2008
Party	Candidate	Votes	%
Democratic	Emil Jones III	76,090	80.1
Republican	Ray Wardingley	18,929	19.9
Total votes		95,019	100.00
Democratic hold			

=== 15th District ===
Illinois' 15th State Senate district election, 2008
Party	Candidate	Votes	%
Democratic	James T. Meeks	72,950	100.00
Total votes		72,950	100.00
Democratic hold			

=== 17th District ===
Illinois' 17th State Senate district election, 2008
Party	Candidate	Votes	%
Democratic	Donne f. Trotter	79,070	100.000
Total votes		79,070	100.00
Democratic hold			

=== 18th District ===
Illinois' 18th State Senate district election, 2008
Party	Candidate	Votes	%
Democratic	Edward d. Maloney	75,229	99.92
Independent	Brendan Appel	58	0.08
Total votes		75,287	100.00
Democratic hold			

=== 20th District ===
Illinois' 9th State Senate district election, 2008
Party	Candidate	Votes	%
Democratic	Iris Y. Martinez	42,310	100.00
Total votes		42,310	100.00
Democratic hold			

=== 21st District ===
Illinois' 21st State Senate district election, 2008
Party	Candidate	Votes	%
Republican	Dan Cronin	64,062	63.14
Democratic	A. Ghani	30 771	30.33
Green	John Basco	6,628	6.53
Total votes		101,461	100.00
Republican hold			

=== 23rd District ===
Illinois' 23rd State Senate district election, 2008
Party	Candidate	Votes	%
Republican	Carole Pankau	61,795	99.91
Independent	Kevin Allen	58	0.09
Total votes		61,853	100.00
Republican hold			

=== 24th District ===
Illinois' 24th State Senate district election, 2008
Party	Candidate	Votes	%
Republican	Kirk W. Dillard	80,766	100.00
Total votes		80,766	100.00
Republican hold			

=== 26th District ===
Illinois' 26th State Senate district election, 2008
Party	Candidate	Votes	%
Republican	Dan Duffy	68,463	62.1
Democratic	Brendan Appel	41,740	37.9
Total votes		110,203	100.00
Republican hold			

=== 27th District ===
Illinois' 27th State Senate district election, 2008
Party	Candidate	Votes	%
Republican	Matt Murphy	52,202	58.4
Democratic	Peter Gutzmer	37,220	41.6
Total votes		89,422	100.00
Republican hold			

=== 29th District ===
Illinois' 29th State Senate district election, 2008
Party	Candidate	Votes	%
Democratic	Susan Garret	72,911	100.00
Total votes		72,911	100.00
Democratic hold			

=== 30th District ===
Illinois' 30th State Senate district election, 2008
Party	Candidate	Votes	%
Democratic	Terry Link	42,407	64.7
Republican	Keith Grey	23,141	35.3
Total votes		65,548	100.00
Democratic hold			

=== 32nd District ===
Illinois' 32nd State Senate district election, 2008
Party	Candidate	Votes	%
Republican	Pamela J. Althoff	93,855	100.00
Total votes		93,855	100.00
Republican hold			

=== 33rd District ===
Illinois' 33rd State Senate district election, 2008
Party	Candidate	Votes	%
Democratic	Dan Kotowski	48,344	59.95
Republican	Michael H. Sweeney	32,293	40.05
Total votes		80,637	100.00
Democratic hold			

=== 35th District ===
Illinois' 35th State Senate district election, 2008
Party	Candidate	Votes	%
Republican	J. Bradley Burzynski	61,749	58.98
Democratic	Ryan Gailey	42,948	41.02
Total votes		104,697	100.00
Democratic hold			

=== 36th District ===
Illinois' 36th State Senate district election, 2008
Party	Candidate	Votes	%
Democratic	Mike Jacobs	55,448	58.78
Republican	Michael Bertelsen	38,882	41.22
Total votes		94,330	100.00
Democratic hold			

=== 38th District ===
Illinois' 38th State Senate district election, 2008
Party	Candidate	Votes	%
Republican	Gary G. Dahl	62,790	61.88
Democratic	Steve Stout	38,687	38.12
Total votes		101,477	100.00
Democratic hold			

=== 39th District ===
Illinois' 39th State Senate district election, 2008
Party	Candidate	Votes	%
Democratic	Don Harmon	57,487	100.00
Total votes		57,487	100.00
Democratic hold			

=== 41st District ===
Illinois' 41st State Senate district election, 2008
Party	Candidate	Votes	%
Republican	Christine Radogno	74,777	63.57
Democratic	Audrey Manly	42,848	36.43
Total votes		117,625	100.00
Republican hold			

=== 42nd district ===
Illinois' 42nd State Senate district election, 2008
Party	Candidate	Votes	%
Democratic	Linda Holmes	57,231	54.61
Republican	Terri Ann Wintermute	47,567	45.39
Total votes		104,798	100.00
Republican hold			

=== 44th District ===
Illinois' 44th State Senate district election, 2008
Party	Candidate	Votes	%
Republican	Bill Brady	82,718	100.00
Total votes		82,718	100.00
Republican hold			

=== 45th District ===
Illinois' 45th State Senate district election, 2008
Party	Candidate	Votes	%
Republican	Tim Bivins	61,310	63.18
Democratic	Marty Mulcahey	35,728	36.82
Total votes		97,038	100.00
Republican hold			

=== 47th District ===
Illinois' 47th State Senate district election, 2008
Party	Candidate	Votes	%
Democratic	John M. Sullivan	77,597	100.00
Total votes		77.597	100.00
Democratic hold			

=== 48th District ===
Illinois' 48th State Senate district election, 2008
Party	Candidate	Votes	%
Republican	Randall M. "Randy" Hultgren	77,310	100.00
Total votes		77,310	100.00
Republican hold			

=== 50th District ===
Illinois' 50th State Senate district election, 2008
Party	Candidate	Votes	%
Republican	Larry K. Bomke	82,011	77.75
Democratic	John Devine	23,474	22.25
Total votes		105,485	100.00
Republican hold			

=== 51st District ===
Illinois' 51st State Senate district election, 2008
Party	Candidate	Votes	%
Republican	Frank Watson	82,718	100.00
Total votes		82,718	100.00
Republican hold			

=== 53rd District ===
Illinois' 53rd State Senate district election, 2008
Party	Candidate	Votes	%
Republican	Dan Rutherford	90,199	100.00
Total votes		90,199	100.00
Republican hold			

=== 54th District ===
Illinois' 54th State Senate district election, 2008
Party	Candidate	Votes	%
Republican	John O. Jones	63,944	70.05
Democratic	Henry S. Kijonka	27,337	29.95
Total votes		76,108	100.00
Republican hold			

=== 56th District ===
Illinois' 56th State Senate district election, 2008
Party	Candidate	Votes	%
Democratic	William R. Haine	82,672	100.00
Total votes		82,672	100.00
Democratic hold			

=== 57th District ===
Illinois' 57th State Senate district election, 2008
Party	Candidate	Votes	%
Democratic	James Clayborne, Jr.	76,108	100.00
Total votes		76,108	100.00
Democratic hold			

=== 59th District ===
Illinois' 59th State Senate district election, 2008
Party	Candidate	Votes	%
Democratic	Gary Forby	49,552	51.47
Republican	Ken W. Burzynski	46,727	48.53
Total votes		96,279	100.00
Democratic hold			
