= 2018 Illinois Senate election =

- November 6, 2018

39 of 59 seats in the Illinois Senate 30 seats needed for a majority
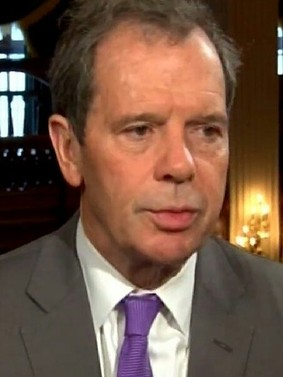

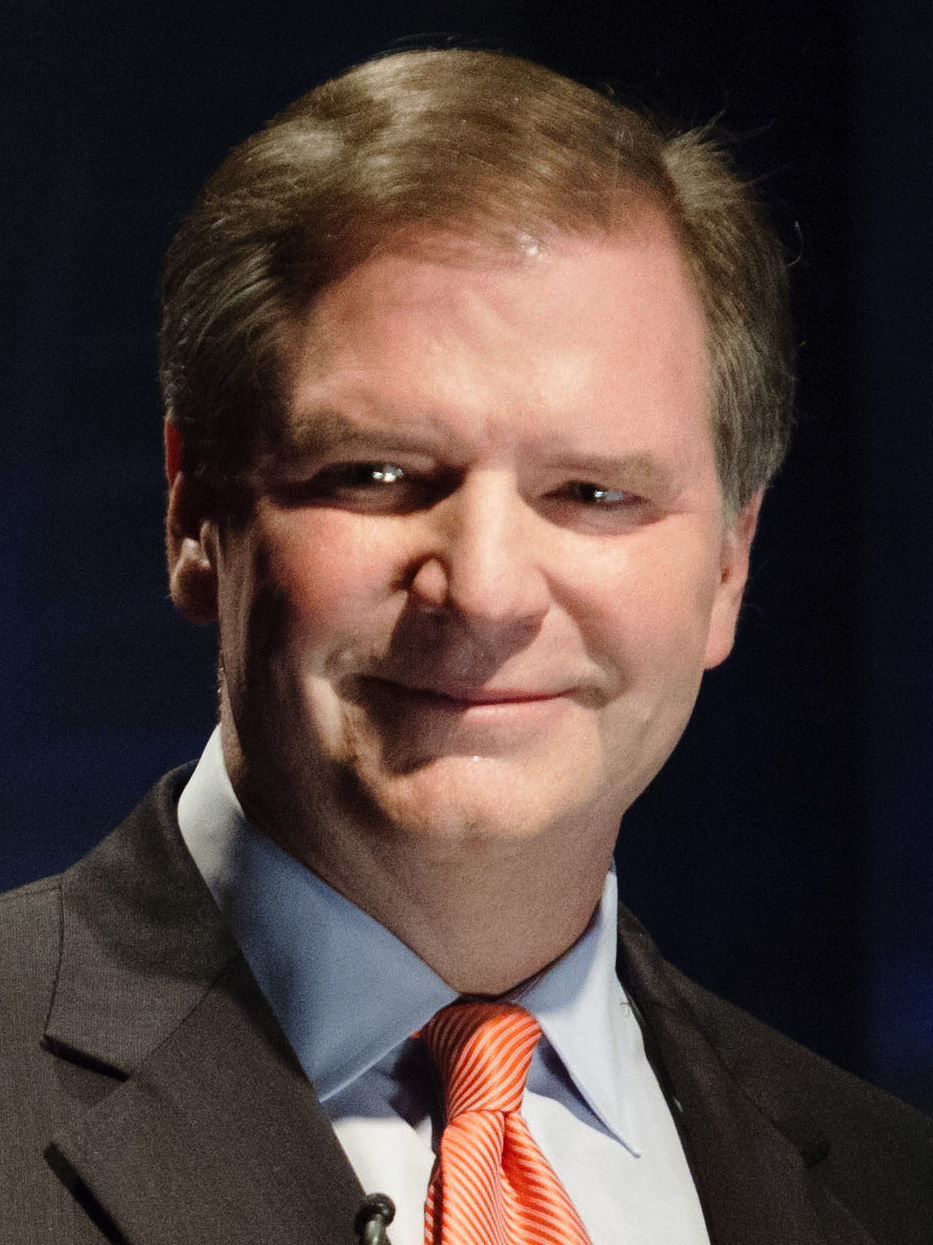
	Majority party	Minority party
Leader	John Cullerton	Bill Brady
Party	Democratic	Republican
Leader's seat	6th-Chicago	44th-Bloomington
Last election	37	22
Seats won	40	19
Seat change	▲3	▼3
Popular vote	1,613,380	1,162,385
Percentage	57.45%	41.39%
Swing	▼2.00%	▲0.84%
- Democratic gain Democratic hold Republican hold No election 50–60% 60–70% 70–80% >90% 50–60% 60–70% >90%
Senate President before election
John Cullerton
Democratic
Elected Senate President
John Cullerton
Democratic

The 2018 elections for the Illinois Senate took place on November 6, 2018, to elect senators from 39 of the state's 59 Senate districts to serve in the 101st General Assembly, with seats apportioned among the states based on the 2010 United States census. Under the Illinois Constitution of 1970, senators are divided into three groups, each group having a two-year term at a different part of the decade between censuses, with the rest of the decade being taken up by two four-year terms. The Democratic Party had held a majority in the Senate since 2003, and gained a net of three seats.

The elections for Illinois's 18 congressional districts, governor, statewide constitutional officers, and all 118 seats in the Illinois House of Representatives were also held on this date.

The Republicans needed to win eight seats in order to become the majority party. However, the Democratic Party picked up three additional seats and increased the party's supermajority to 40 seats.

== Overview ==
2018 Illinois State Senate elections
Party	Votes	Percentage	% change	Previous Senate			Total seats after election	+/–
Party	Votes	Percentage	% change	Seats held over	Seats up	Total seats before election	Total seats after election	+/–
Democratic	1,613,380	57.45%	▼2.00%	16	21	37	40	▲3
Republican	1,162,385	41.39	▲0.84%	4	18	22	19	▼3
Downstate United	32,549	1.16%	N/A	0	0	0	0	0
Write-Ins	163	0.00%	N/A	0	0	0	0	0
Totals	2,808,477	100.00%	N/A	20	39	59	59	—

== Predictions ==
Source	Ranking	As of
Governing	Safe D	October 8, 2018

== Elections by district ==
=== District 2 ===
Democrat Omar Aquino had represented the 2nd district since 2016. The 2nd district includes all or parts of Belmont Cragin, Dunning, Hermosa, Humboldt Park, Logan Square, and West Town. On November 27, 2017, Aquino filed to run for reelection.

Democratic primary
Party	Candidate	Votes	%
Democratic	Omar Aquino (incumbent)	19,579	100.0
Total votes		19,579	100.0

General election
Party	Candidate	Votes	%
Democratic	Omar Aquino (incumbent)	51,282	100.0
Total votes		51,282	100.0
Democratic hold			

=== District 3 ===
Democrat Mattie Hunter had represented the 3rd district since 2003. The 3rd includes Armour Square, Bridgeport, Bronzeville, Chicago Lawn, Douglas, Englewood, Fuller Park, Gage Park, McKinley Park, Near North Side, New City, Washington Park, West Englewood, and Woodlawn On November 27, 2017, Hunter filed to run for reelection.

Democratic primary
Party	Candidate	Votes	%
Democratic	Mattie Hunter (incumbent)	25,401	100.0
Total votes		25,401	100.0

General election
Party	Candidate	Votes	%
Democratic	Mattie Hunter (incumbent)	62,764	100.0
Total votes		62,764	100.0
Democratic hold			

=== District 5 ===
Democrat Patricia Van Pelt had represented the 5th district since 2013. The 5th is located in Chicago. On November 30, 2017, Van Pelt filed to run for reelection.

Democratic primary
Party	Candidate	Votes	%
Democratic	Patricia Van Pelt (incumbent)	23,842	100.0
Total votes		23,842	100.0

General election
Party	Candidate	Votes	%
Democratic	Patricia Van Pelt (incumbent)	63,756	100.0
Total votes		63,756	100.0
Democratic hold			

=== District 6 ===
Democrat John Cullerton, the president of the Illinois Senate, had represented the 6th district since his 1991 appointment to succeed Dawn Clark Netsch who had been elected Illinois Comptroller. The 6th district is centered on Lakeview and Lincoln Park in Chicago. On November 27, 2017, Cullerton filed to run for reelection.

Democratic primary
Party	Candidate	Votes	%
Democratic	John Cullerton (incumbent)	33,193	100.0
Total votes		33,193	100.0

General election
Party	Candidate	Votes	%
Democratic	John Cullerton (incumbent)	88,756	100.0
Total votes		88,756	100.0
Democratic hold			

=== District 8 ===
Democrat Ira Silverstein had represented the 8th district since 1999. The 8th Senate District consists of Forest Glen, North Park, and West Ridge in the City of Chicago, and its surrounding suburbs of Park Ridge, Morton Grove, Niles, Lincolnwood, and Skokie. Silverstein filed to run for reelection on November 27, 2017.

In November 2017, lobbyist and victims' rights advocate Denise Rotheimer testified that Silverstein had sexually harassed her while she was lobbying for a bill's passage through Silverstein's committee. Afterwards, several Democratic challengers emerged to run against Silverstein. Ram Villivalam, former political director for Brad Schneider, filed on November 27, 2017. Zehra Quadri, David Zulkey, and Caroline Mcateer-Fournier also filed to run in the Democratic primary. Villivalam was endorsed by Congresswoman Jan Schakowsky, Congressman Brad Schneider, State Senator Laura Murphy, and Alderman Ameya Pawar.

On December 29, 2017, it was reported that Senator Silverstein was 45 signatures short of the 1,000 required to be eligible for ballot access in the Democratic primary. Silverstein was ultimately found to have sufficient signatures, and remained on the ballot. Villivalam defeated Silverstein in the Democratic primary on March 20, 2018.

Democratic primary
Party	Candidate	Votes	%
Democratic	Ram Villivalam	14,689	51.3
Democratic	Ira Silverstein (incumbent)	8,586	30.0
Democratic	Caroline McAteer-Fournier	3,864	13.5
Democratic	David Zulkey	1,491	5.2
Total votes		28,630	100.0

General election
Party	Candidate	Votes	%
Democratic	Ram Villivalam	50,071	100.0
Total votes		50,071	100.0
Democratic hold			

=== District 9 ===
Democrat Daniel Biss had represented the 9th district since January 2013. The 9th district includes all or parts of Evanston, Glencoe, Glenview, Golf, Morton Grove, Northbrook, Northfield, Skokie, Wilmette, and Winnetka. Biss vacated his Senate seat to run for the Democratic nomination in the 2018 gubernatorial election.

On July 28, 2017, State Representative Laura Fine announced her intention to run for the 9th Senate District. On December 4, 2017, both Fine and her Republican opponent, 2016 congressional candidate Joan McCarthy Lasonde, filed petitions.

Democratic primary
Party	Candidate	Votes	%
Democratic	Laura Fine	38,378	100.0
Total votes		38,378	100.0

Republican primary
Party	Candidate	Votes	%
Republican	Joan McCarthy Lasonde	8,643	100.0
Total votes		8,643	100.0

General election
Party	Candidate	Votes	%
Democratic	Laura Fine	73,710	71.8
Republican	Joan McCarthy Lasonde	28,889	28.2
Total votes		102,599	100.0
Democratic hold			

=== District 11 ===
Democrat Martin Sandoval had been a member of the Illinois Senate since 2003. He represented the 11th district, which includes all or parts of the Chicago neighborhoods of Brighton Park, Clearing, Gage Park, Garfield Ridge, Little Village, and West Lawn; and the suburbs of Bedford Park, Burbank, Cicero, Forest View, Lyons, McCook, Stickney, Illinois, Summit, and Riverside. On November 27, 2017, Sandoval filed to run for reelection. No other candidates filed to run.

Democratic primary
Party	Candidate	Votes	%
Democratic	Martin Sandoval (incumbent)	20,451	100.0
Total votes		20,451	100.0

General election
Party	Candidate	Votes	%
Democratic	Martin Sandoval (incumbent)	39,158	100.0
Total votes		39,158	100.0
Democratic hold			

=== District 12 ===
Democrat Steven Landek had been a member of the Illinois Senate since his appointment in 2011. He represented the 12th district, which includes all or parts of Bridgeview, Burbank, Bedford Park, McCook, Brookfield, Riverside, Berwyn, and Cicero.

Landek filed to run for reelection on November 27, 2017. No other candidates filed to run.

Democratic primary
Party	Candidate	Votes	%
Democratic	Steven Landek (incumbent)	16,374	100.0
Total votes		16,374	100.0

General election
Party	Candidate	Votes	%
Democratic	Steven Landek (incumbent)	38,061	100.0
Total votes		38,061	100.0
Democratic hold			

=== District 14 ===
Democrat Emil Jones III had represented the 14th district since 2009. The district includes Washington Heights, Morgan Park, and West Pullman in Chicago as well as the suburbs of Oak Forest, Crestwood, Alsip, Blue Island, Calumet Park, and Tinley Park. On November 30, 2017, Emil Jones III filed to run for reelection. No other candidates filed to run.

Democratic primary
Party	Candidate	Votes	%
Democratic	Emil Jones III (incumbent)	32,119	100.0
Total votes		32,119	100.0

General election
Party	Candidate	Votes	%
Democratic	Emil Jones III (incumbent)	65,275	100.0
Total votes		65,275	100.0
Democratic hold			

=== District 15 ===
Democrat Napoleon Harris had represented the 15th district since 2013. The 15th district stretches from Blue Island in the north, Calumet City in the east, Homewood in the west, Steger in the south, and includes all or parts of Crete-Monee, Dolton, Flossmoor, Glenwood, Thornton, Markham, Midlothian, Oak Forest, Harvey, Riverdale, and South Holland. On December 4, 2017, Harris filed to run for reelection. Terry Brown, a Phoenix resident, filed to challenge Harris in the Democratic primary. No Republican candidates filed to run. Terry Brown was removed from the ballot due to an insufficient number of signatures.

Democratic primary
Party	Candidate	Votes	%
Democratic	Napoleon Harris (incumbent)	27,322	100.0
Total votes		27,322	100.0

General election
Party	Candidate	Votes	%
Democratic	Napoleon Harris (incumbent)	59,332	100.0
Total votes		59,332	100.0
Democratic hold			

=== District 17 ===
Democrat Donne Trotter had been a member of the Illinois Senate since 1993. The 17th district includes Burnside, Chatham, Pullman, and South Deering in Chicago and the suburbs of Burnham, Calumet City, Lansing, Ford Heights, Lynwood, Sauk Village, Willowbrook, Beecher, Manteno, and Grant Park. On November 27, 2017, Trotter filed to run for reelection. No other candidates filed to run.

Donne Trotter would go on to win his primary not before announcing his retirement on January 19, 2018. Elgie R. Sims Jr., previously serving the Illinois 34th State House district, was appointed as State Senator on January 26, 2018.

Democratic primary
Party	Candidate	Votes	%
Democratic	Donne Trotter	31,861	100.0
Total votes		31,861	100.0

General election
Party	Candidate	Votes	%
Democratic	Elgie R. Sims, Jr. (incumbent)	66,268	100.0
n/a	Write-ins	1	0.0
Total votes		66,269	100.0
Democratic hold			

=== District 18 ===
Democrat Bill Cunningham had represented the 18th district since 2013. The 18th district is split between Chicago and its suburbs. It includes the Beverly, Mount Greenwood, and Auburn-Gresham neighborhoods in Chicago, as well as the all or parts of the surrounding suburbs of Oak Lawn, Evergreen Park, Chicago Ridge, Hometown, and Palos Hills. Orland Park, Orland Hills, Palos Heights, Palos Park, Worth, Oak Lawn, Alsip, Merrionette Park, and Evergreen Park.

On November 27, 2017, Cunningham filed to run for reelection. No other candidates filed to run.

Democratic primary
Party	Candidate	Votes	%
Democratic	Bill Cunningham (incumbent)	31,038	100.0
Total votes		31,038	100.0

General election
Party	Candidate	Votes	%
Democratic	Bill Cunningham (incumbent)	64,048	100.0
Total votes		64,048	100.0
Democratic hold			

=== District 20 ===
Democrat Iris Martinez had represented the 20th district since 2003. The 20th includes all or parts of Albany Park, Avondale, Belmont Cragin, Hermosa, Old Irving Park, Portage Park, and Logan Square. On November 27, 2017, Martinez filed to run for reelection. She faced a primary challenge from Chicago resident Bart Goldberg.

Democratic primary
Party	Candidate	Votes	%
Democratic	Iris Martinez (incumbent)	19,414	73.4
Democratic	Bart Goldberg	7,050	26.6
Total votes		26,464	100.0

General election
Party	Candidate	Votes	%
Democratic	Iris Martinez (incumbent)	55,151	100.0
Total votes		55,151	100.0
Democratic hold			

=== District 21 ===
Republican Michael Connelly had represented the 21st district since 2013. The 21st district Carol Stream, Lisle, Warrenville, Wheaton, Winfield, West Chicago, and Naperville. On November 27, 2017, Connelly filed to run for reelection. Naperville resident Laura Ellman was the sole Democratic candidate.

Democratic primary
Party	Candidate	Votes	%
Democratic	Laura Ellman	18,438	100.0
Total votes		18,438	100.0

Republican primary
Party	Candidate	Votes	%
Republican	Michael Connelly (incumbent)	17,952	100.0
Total votes		17,952	100.0

General election
Party	Candidate	Votes	%
Democratic	Laura Ellman	49,928	50.6
Republican	Michael Connelly (incumbent)	48,749	49.4
Total votes		98,677	100.0
Democratic gain from Republican			

=== District 23 ===
The 23rd district spans northern DuPage County and includes all or parts of Addison, Bloomingdale, Bartlett, Carol Stream, Glendale Heights, Hanover Park, Itasca, Villa Park, West Chicago, Wayne, and Wood Dale. Democrat Tom Cullerton had represented the district since was he first elected to the Illinois Senate in 2012. The 23rd district was the third most Republican seat held by a Democrat. Cullerton filed to run for reelection. Republican Seth Lewis, Cullerton's 2016 opponent, filed for a rematch.

Democratic primary
Party	Candidate	Votes	%
Democratic	Tom Cullerton (incumbent)	13,101	100.0
Total votes		13,101	100.0

Republican primary
Party	Candidate	Votes	%
Republican	Seth Lewis	12,193	100.0
Total votes		12,193	100.0

General election
Party	Candidate	Votes	%
Democratic	Tom Cullerton (incumbent)	39,604	54.9
Republican	Seth Lewis	32,582	45.1
Total votes		72,186	100.0
Democratic hold			

=== District 24 ===
Republican Chris Nybo had represented the 24th district since August 2014. The 47th district includes all or parts of Wheaton, Glen Ellyn, Lombard, Elmhurst, Oak Brook, Western Springs, Clarendon Hills, Westmont, Hinsdale, Downers Grove, and Lisle. The 24th was the fourth most Democratic seat held by a Republican. On November 27, 2017, Nybo filed to run for reelection. Nybo's 2014 opponent, Suzy Glowiak, filed to run as the Democratic nominee.

Democratic primary
Party	Candidate	Votes	%
Democratic	Suzy Glowiak	20,984	100.0
Total votes		20,984	100.0

Republican primary
Party	Candidate	Votes	%
Republican	Chris Nybo (incumbent)	17,575	100.0
Total votes		17,575	100.0

General election
Party	Candidate	Votes	%
Democratic	Suzy Glowiak	51,695	50.8
Republican	Chris Nybo (incumbent)	50,059	49.2
Total votes		101,754	100.0
Democratic gain from Republican			

=== District 26 ===
Republican Dan McConchie had represented the 26th district since his appointment in April 2016. The 26th district includes Algonquin, Barrington, Cary, Deer Park, Fox River Grove, Hawthorn Woods, Island Lake, Kildeer, Lake Zurich, Libertyville, Long Grove, Mundelein, and Wauconda. On November 27, 2017, McConchie filed to run for reelection. Mundelein resident Tom Georges was the sole Democratic candidate.

Democratic primary
Party	Candidate	Votes	%
Democratic	Tom Georges	16,261	100.0
Total votes		16,261	100.0

Republican primary
Party	Candidate	Votes	%
Republican	Dan McConchie (incumbent)	16,408	100.0
Total votes		16,408	100.0

General election
Party	Candidate	Votes	%
Republican	Dan McConchie (incumbent)	51,754	54.7
Democratic	Tom Georges	42,924	45.3
Total votes		94,678	100.0
Republican hold			

=== District 27 ===
Tom Rooney had represented the 27th district since his September 2016 appointment to replace outgoing senator Matt Murphy. The 27th district includes parts of Arlington Heights, Barrington, Buffalo Grove, Inverness, Palatine, Wheeling, Prospect Heights, and South Barrington. The 27th was the third most Democratic seat held by a Republican.

On November 27, 2017, Rooney filed to run for retention. Democrats Joe Sonnefeldt and Ann Gillespie filed to run for the Democratic nomination.

Democratic primary
Party	Candidate	Votes	%
Democratic	Ann Gillespie	18,279	74.8
Democratic	Joe Sonnefeldt	6,154	25.2
Total votes		24,433	100.0

Republican primary
Party	Candidate	Votes	%
Republican	Tom Rooney (incumbent)	15,537	100.0
Total votes		15,537	100.0

General election
Party	Candidate	Votes	%
Democratic	Ann Gillespie	46,981	52.0
Republican	Tom Rooney (incumbent)	43,375	48.0
Total votes		90,356	100.0
Democratic gain from Republican			

=== District 29 ===
Democrat Julie Morrison had represented the 29th district since 2013. The 29th district includes all or parts of Arlington Heights, Buffalo Grove, Bannockburn, Deerfield, Glencoe, Glenview, Highland Park, Lake Bluff, Lake Forest, Lincolnshire, Northbrook, and North Chicago. On November 27, 2017, Morrison filed to run for reelection. Republican Barrett Davie also filed.

Democratic primary
Party	Candidate	Votes	%
Democratic	Julie Morrison (incumbent)	21,888	100.0
Total votes		21,888	100.0

Republican primary
Party	Candidate	Votes	%
Republican	Barrett Davie	8,400	100.0
Total votes		8,400	100.0

General election
Party	Candidate	Votes	%
Democratic	Julie Morrison (incumbent)	51,162	63.2
Republican	Barrett Davie	29,791	36.8
Total votes		80,953	100.0
Democratic hold			

=== District 30 ===
Democrat Terry Link had represented the 30th district since 1997. The 30th district includes all or part of the municipalities of Beach Park, Buffalo Grove, Green Oaks, Lincolnshire, Mundelein, North Chicago, Riverwoods, Wheeling, Vernon Hills, and Waukegan. On November 27, 2017, Link filed to run for reelection. Republican candidate Soojae Lee also filed.

Democratic primary
Party	Candidate	Votes	%
Democratic	Terry Link (incumbent)	14,181	100.0
Total votes		14,181	100.0

Republican primary
Party	Candidate	Votes	%
Republican	Soojae Lee	5,062	100.0
Total votes		5,062	100.0

General election
Party	Candidate	Votes	%
Democratic	Terry Link (incumbent)	38,860	68.0
Republican	Soojae Lee	18,263	32.0
Total votes		57,123	100.0
Democratic hold			

=== District 32 ===
Republican Pamela Althoff had represented the 32nd District since her appointment in March 2003. The 32nd district includes all or parts of Harvard, Marengo, Woodstock, Bull Valley, Wonder Lake, Illinois, Greenwood, McHenry, Fox Lake, Spring Grove, Johnsburg, and Lakemoor.

Althoff chose to run for the McHenry County Board instead of seeking reelection to the Illinois Senate. Craig Wilcox and John Reinert, both members of the McHenry County Board, filed to run for the Republican nomination, but Reinert withdrew. Mary Mahaday, McHenry Township Assessor, was the sole Democratic candidate.

Democratic primary
Party	Candidate	Votes	%
Democratic	Mary Mahaday	12,541	100.0
Total votes		12,541	100.0

Republican primary
Party	Candidate	Votes	%
Republican	Craig Wilcox (incumbent)	15,906	100.0
Total votes		15,906	100.0

General election
Party	Candidate	Votes	%
Republican	Craig Wilcox (incumbent)	43,402	54.7
Democratic	Mary Mahady	35,936	45.3
Total votes		79,338	100.0
Republican hold			

=== District 33 ===
Republican Karen McConnaughay had represented the 33rd district since 2013. The 33rd district includes all or parts of Geneva, St. Charles, West Dundee, Hampshire, Huntley, Carpentersville, Lake in the Hills, and Algonquin. On November 27, 2017, McConnaughay filed to run for reelection. Democratic candidate Nancy Zettler also filed.

McConnaughay would go on to win her primary election, but later announced her retirement. She would retire on September 3, 2018. Don DeWitte, former St. Charles, Illinois mayor and alderman, was then appointed to her seat.

Democratic primary
Party	Candidate	Votes	%
Democratic	Nancy Zettler	14,764	100.0
Total votes		14,764	100.0

Republican primary
Party	Candidate	Votes	%
Republican	Karen McConnaughay (incumbent)	14,613	100.0
Total votes		14,613	100.0

General election
Party	Candidate	Votes	%
Republican	Don DeWitte (incumbent)	46,040	50.6
Democratic	Nancy Zettler	44,965	49.4
Total votes		91,005	100.0
Republican hold			

=== District 35 ===
Republican Dave Syverson had been a member of the Illinois Senate since 1993. He represented the 35th district, which includes South Beloit, Rockton, Poplar Grove, Cherry Valley, Rockford, Genoa, DeKalb, Sycamore, Cortland, Hinckley, Maple Park, and Campton Hills. On November 27, 2017, Syverson filed to run for reelection. No other candidates filed to run.

Republican primary
Party	Candidate	Votes	%
Republican	Dave Syverson (incumbent)	16,612	100.0
Total votes		16,612	100.0

General election
Party	Candidate	Votes	%
Republican	Dave Syverson (incumbent)	62,422	100.0
Total votes		62,422	100.0
Republican hold			

=== District 36 ===
Republican Neil Anderson had represented the 36th district since 2013. The 36th district, located in Western Illinois, includes all or parts of Savanna, Morrison, Sterling, Rock Falls, Port Byron, Hillsdale, Silvis, East Moline, Moline, Coal Valley, Rock Island, Milan, Taylor Ridge, and Andalusia. The 36th was the most Democratic seat held by a Republican.

On November 27, 2017, Anderson filed to run for reelection. One week later, Gregg Johnson, former president of AFSCME Local 46, filed to run for the Democratic nomination.

Democratic primary
Party	Candidate	Votes	%
Democratic	Gregg Johnson	13,110	100.0
Total votes		13,110	100.0

Republican primary
Party	Candidate	Votes	%
Republican	Neil Anderson (incumbent)	11,092	100.0
Total votes		11,092	100.0

General election
Party	Candidate	Votes	%
Republican	Neil Anderson (incumbent)	38,728	50.8
Democratic	Gregg Johnson	37,447	49.2
Total votes		76,175	100.0
Republican hold			

=== District 38 ===
Republican Sue Rezin had represented the 38th district since her December 2010 appointment. The 38th district includes all or parts of Spring Valley, DePue, Granville, Hennepin, LaSalle, Ottawa, Marseilles, Oglesby, Streator, Plano, Morris, and Minooka. The 38th was the second most Democratic seat held by a Republican. On November 27, 2017, Rezin filed to run for reelection.

Democratic primary
Party	Candidate	Votes	%
Democratic	Heidi Henry	13,616	100.0
Total votes		13,616	100.0

Republican primary
Party	Candidate	Votes	%
Republican	Sue Rezin (incumbent)	13,841	100.0
Total votes		13,841	100.0

General election
Party	Candidate	Votes	%
Republican	Sue Rezin (incumbent)	47,977	59.4
Democratic	Heidi Henry	32,799	40.6
Total votes		80,776	100.0
Republican hold			

=== District 39 ===
Democrat Don Harmon had represented the 39th district since 2003. The 39th district includes Chicago's Austin neighborhood and the suburbs of Oak Park, Addison, Bensenville, Elmwood Park, Franklin Park, Melrose Park, Northlake, River Grove, Rosemont, Schiller Park, and Stone Park. On November 27, 2017, Harmon filed to run for reelection. No other candidates filed to run.

Democratic primary
Party	Candidate	Votes	%
Democratic	Don Harmon (incumbent)	23,397	100.0
Total votes		23,397	100.0

General election
Party	Candidate	Votes	%
Democratic	Don Harmon (incumbent)	54,149	100.0
Total votes		54,149	100.0
Democratic hold			

=== District 41 ===
Republican John Curran took office in July 2017 after accepting an appointment to replace Senate Minority Leader Christine Radogno who resigned July 1, 2017. The 41st district includes all or parts of Lemont, Indian Head Park, LaGrange, Western Springs, Homer Glen, Burr Ridge, Darien, Downers Grove, Lisle, Willowbrook, Woodridge, Naperville, and Bolingbrook. On November 27, 2017, Curran filed to run for election to his Senate seat. The Democratic candidate was Bridget Fitzgerald, the village clerk of Western Springs.

Democratic primary
Party	Candidate	Votes	%
Democratic	Bridget Fitzgerald	20,628	100.0
Total votes		20,628	100.0

Republican primary
Party	Candidate	Votes	%
Republican	John Curran (incumbent)	17,455	100.0
Total votes		17,455	100.0

General election
Party	Candidate	Votes	%
Republican	John Curran (incumbent)	49,692	50.8
Democratic	Bridget Fitzgerald	48,046	49.2
Total votes		97,738	100.0
Republican hold			

=== District 42 ===
Democrat Linda Holmes had represented the 42nd District since 2007. The 42nd district includes all or parts of Aurora, Boulder Hill, Montgomery, Naperville, North Aurora, and Oswego. On November 27, 2017, Holmes filed to run for reelection. No other candidates filed to run.

Democratic Party
Party	Candidate	Votes	%
Democratic	Linda Holmes (incumbent)	11,331	100.0
Total votes		11,331	100.0

General election
Party	Candidate	Votes	%
Democratic	Linda Holmes (incumbent)	41,787	100.0
Total votes		41,787	100.0
Democratic hold			

=== District 44 ===
Republican Minority Leader Bill Brady had represented the 44th district since 2003. The 44th includes Tazewell, McLean, Menard, Logan, and Sangamon counties. On November 27, 2017, Brady filed to run for reelection. No other candidates filed to run.

Republican primary
Party	Candidate	Votes	%
Republican	Bill Brady (incumbent)	21,790	100.0
Total votes		21,790	100.0

General election
Party	Candidate	Votes	%
Republican	Bill Brady (incumbent)	70,464	100.0
Total votes		70,464	100.0
Republican hold			

=== District 45 ===
Republican Tim Bivins had represented the 45th district since 2008. The 45th includes all or parts of Jo Daviess, Stephenson, Carroll, Winnebago, Ogle, Lee, DeKalb, and LaSalle counties in northwestern Illinois. On June 12, 2017, Bivins announced that he would not seek another term. Republican state representative Brian W. Stewart ran to succeed him. Li Arellano Jr., the mayor of Dixon, had planned to run in the Republican primary, but withdrew on December 2, citing his responsibilities outside of politics.

David Simpson, a lumber yard manager, ran as the Democratic candidate.

Democratic primary
Party	Candidate	Votes	%
Democratic	David Simpson	10,019	100.0
Total votes		10,019	100.0

Republican primary
Party	Candidate	Votes	%
Republican	Brian W. Stewart	21,092	100.0
Total votes		21,092	100.0

General election
Party	Candidate	Votes	%
Republican	Brian W. Stewart	49,936	62.6
Democratic	David Simpson	29,781	37.4
Total votes		79,717	100.0
Republican hold			

=== District 47 ===
Republican Jil Tracy had represented the 47th district since 2017. The 47th includes all of Adams, Brown, Cass, Hancock, Henderson, Mason, McDonough, Schuyler, Warren counties and portions of Fulton, and Knox counties. On November 27, 2017, Tracy filed to run for reelection. No other candidates filed to run.

Republican primary
Party	Candidate	Votes	%
Republican	Jil Tracy (incumbent)	16,013	100.0
Total votes		16,013	100.0

General election
Party	Candidate	Votes	%
Republican	Jil Tracy (incumbent)	61,521	99.7
n/a	Write-in votes	160	0.3
Total votes		61,681	100.0
Republican hold			

=== District 48 ===
Democrat Andy Manar had represented the 48th district since 2013. The 48th district includes all or parts of The 48th district includes all or parts of Macon, Sangamon, Christian, Montgomery, Macoupin, and Madison counties. The 48th was the most Republican seat held by a Democrat. On November 27, 2017, Manar filed to run for reelection. Seth McMillan, chair of the Christian County Republican Party, and Christopher Hicks, a 2016 candidate for the Illinois House of Representatives, filed to run as Republicans. Hicks was disqualified from the Republican primary ballot after a petition challenge.

Democratic primary
Party	Candidate	Votes	%
Democratic	Andy Manar (incumbent)	13,715	100.0
Total votes		13,715	100.0

Republican primary
Party	Candidate	Votes	%
Republican	Seth McMillan	11,009	100.0
Total votes		11,009	100.0

General election
Party	Candidate	Votes	%
Democratic	Andy Manar (incumbent)	42,068	56.8
Republican	Seth McMillan	32,021	43.2
n/a	Write-in votes	2	0.0
Total votes		74,091	100.0
Democratic hold			

=== District 50 ===
Republican Sam McCann had been a member of the Illinois Senate since 2011. He represented the 50th district, which includes all or parts of Pike, Calhoun, Greene, Jersey, Macoupin, Morgan, Scott, and Sangamon counties. McCann, a noted opponent of Governor Bruce Rauner, chose not to file for reelection. He had been facing a primary challenge from Steve McClure, an assistant state's attorney in Sangamon County. Prior to McCann's retirement, McClure was endorsed by the Sangamon County Republican Party. No Democratic candidate filed to run for the seat.

Republican primary
Party	Candidate	Votes	%
Republican	Steve McClure	19,049	100.0
Total votes		19,049	100.0

General election
Party	Candidate	Votes	%
Republican	Steve McClure	72,429	100.0
Total votes		72,429	100.0
Republican hold			

=== District 51 ===
Republican Chapin Rose had represented the 51st district since 2013. The 51st district includes all or parts of McLean, DeWitt, Macon, Moultrie, Champaign, Douglas, Edgar, and Shelby counties. On November 27, 2017, Rose filed to run for reelection.

Ben Chapman, a University of Illinois student from Mahomet, attempted to win the Democratic nomination via write-in during the March 20th primary, but failed to clear the write-in vote threshold. He opted not to pursue placement on the ballot via the post-primary slating process.

Republican primary
Party	Candidate	Votes	%
Republican	Chapin Rose (incumbent)	24,881	100.0
Total votes		24,881	100.0

General election
Party	Candidate	Votes	%
Republican	Chapin Rose (incumbent)	77,252	100.0
Total votes		77,252	100.0
Republican hold			

=== District 53 ===
Republican Jason Barickman had represented the 53rd district since 2013. He represents the 53rd district, which includes all or parts of Ford, Iroquois, Livingston, McLean, Vermilion, and Woodford counties in Central Illinois. On November 27, 2017, Barickman filed to run for reelection. No other candidates filed to run.

Republican primary
Party	Candidate	Votes	%
Republican	Jason Barickman (incumbent)	22,686	100.0
Total votes		22,686	100.0

General election
Party	Candidate	Votes	%
Republican	Jason Barickman (incumbent)	66,592	100.0
Total votes		66,592	100.0
Republican hold			

=== District 54 ===
Republican Kyle McCarter was first appointed in February 2009. He represents the 54th district, which includes all or parts of Effingham, Fayette, Bond, Clinton, Marion, Madison, Washington, and St. Clair counties in Downstate Illinois.

McCarter announced that he would not seek reelection in 2018. On November 27, 2017, four candidates filed to run in the Republican primary: Greenville University basketball coach George Barber, Clinton County Board member Rafael Him, perennial candidate Jason Plummer, and Marion County Republican Party Chairman Benjamin Stratemeyer. No Democratic candidate filed to run for the seat.

On March 20, 2018, Jason Plummer won the Republican primary. Brian Stout, president of the Vandalia Municipal Airport, was slated by the Democratic Party to be its nominee.

Republican primary
Party	Candidate	Votes	%
Republican	Jason Plummer	13,265	57.2
Republican	Benjamin Stratemeyer	4,689	20.2
Republican	Rafael Him	2,766	11.9
Republican	George Barber	2,459	10.6
Total votes		23,179	100.0

General election
Party	Candidate	Votes	%
Republican	Jason Plummer	59,476	70.0
Democratic	Brian Stout	25,510	30.0
Total votes		84,986	100.0
Republican hold			

=== District 56 ===
Democrat Bill Haine was appointed to the Illinois Senate in November 2002. He represents the 56th district, which includes all or parts of Alton, Bethalto, Caseyville, Collinsville, East Alton, Edwardsville, Elsah, Fairview Heights, Glen Carbon, Godfrey, Granite City, Hartford, Madison, Maryville, O'Fallon, Pontoon Beach, Roxana, Shiloh, South Roxana, Swansea, and Wood River. On August 16, 2017, Haine announced that he would not seek reelection to a sixth term. The 56th was the second most Republican seat held by a Democrat. Rachelle Crowe, a prosecutor with the Madison County State's Attorney's Office, was the Democratic nominee.

Edwardsville Mayor Hal Patton filed for the Republican nomination. On March 10, 2018, Hal Patton was removed from the ballot by the Illinois Appellate Court after he signed a petition for Katie Stuart. By signing the petition he had technically affirmed he was a Democrat, despite not identifying with the Democratic Party. This disqualified him from running as a Republican in the 2018 primary or general election. One month later, Patton relaunched his campaign under the new banner of "Downstate United", a new political party which existed solely to allow Patton to run for office as a partisan candidate rather than an independent candidate, which significantly reduces the barriers to ballot access.

Aud Crowe defeated Patton in the 2018 general election.

Democratic primary
Party	Candidate	Votes	%
Democratic	Rachelle Crowe	15,191	100.0
Total votes		15,191	100.0

General election
Party	Candidate	Votes	%
Democratic	Rachelle Crowe	45,727	58.4
Downstate United	Hal Patton	32,549	41.6
Total votes		78,276	100.0
Democratic hold			

=== District 57 ===
Democratic Majority Leader James Clayborne Jr. was appointed to the Illinois Senate in April 1995. He represents the 57th District, located in the Metro East region includes all or parts of Freeburg, Belleville, East St. Louis, O'Fallon, Madison, Fairview Heights, Shiloh, and Scott Air Force Base. On September 21, 2017, Clayborne announced that he would not run for reelection in 2018.

On November 27, 2017, shock jock and convicted felon Bob Romanik filed for the Republican nomination. On December 4, 2017, Republicans Dave Barnes, the incumbent St. Clair Township Supervisor, and Tanya Hildenbrand, an Air Force reservist, filed to run for the Republican nomination. The same day, Christopher Belt, the Cahokia School Board president, became the sole Democrat to file for the seat.

On December 11, 2017, Dave Barnes withdrew from the Republican primary. The St. Clair County Republican Party endorsed Hildenbrand, citing Romanik's past racist and sexist comments. Hildenbrand defeated Romanik to become the Republican nominee.

Belt defeated Hildenbrand in the 2018 general election.

Democratic primary
Party	Candidate	Votes	%
Democratic	Christopher Belt	16,618	100.0
Total votes		16,618	100.0

Republican primary
Party	Candidate	Votes	%
Republican	Tanya Hildenbrand	5,235	64.9
Republican	Bob Romanik	2,830	35.1
Total votes		8,065	100.0

General election
Party	Candidate	Votes	%
Democratic	Christopher Belt	44,254	59.2
Republican	Tanya Hildenbrand	30,496	40.8
Total votes		74,750	100.0
Democratic hold			

=== District 59 ===
Republican Dale Fowler was first elected in 2016. Fowler represents the 59th district, which includes all of Franklin, Hamilton, Williamson, Saline, Gallatin, Hardin, Pope, Massac, Johnson, Pulaski, and Alexander counties and portions of Union, and Jackson counties in Southern Illinois. On November 27, 2017, Fowler filed to run for reelection. Steve Webb, superintendent of Goreville Community Unit School District #1, was slated as the Democratic nominee, and would appear on the ballot if he received 1,000 valid petition signatures by June 4, 2018.

Republican primary
Party	Candidate	Votes	%
Republican	Dale Fowler (incumbent)	15,434	100.0
Total votes		15,434	100

General election
Party	Candidate	Votes	%
Republican	Dale Fowler (incumbent)	50,475	61.1
Democratic	Steve Webb	32,125	38.9
Total votes		82,600	100.0
Republican hold			
