= Jim Reilly (Illinois politician) =

American politician (1945–2022)

James R. Reilly (January 31, 1945 – April 4, 2022) was an American politician who served as a Republican member of the Illinois House of Representatives.

== Early life ==
James R. Reilly was born January 31, 1945, in Springfield, Illinois. He moved to Jacksonville, Illinois in 1962. He graduated from Illinois College in 1967 and from the University of Chicago Law School in 1972. He returned to Jacksonville and served as its city attorney. In 1976, he was elected as one of three representatives from the 49th district to the Illinois House of Representatives. Prior to serving in the Illinois House of Representatives, he worked as an aide to State Representative George Burditt and taught in Winchester, Illinois for two years.

== Legislative career ==
During his freshman term his duties in the General Assembly included: Minority Spokesman, State Government Committee; Vice Chairman, Joint Committee on Administrative Rules; Member, Appropriations II and Elementary and Secondary Education Committees, and Commission on Mental Health and Developmental Disabilities.

== Government career and appointments ==
Governor James R. Thompson made Reilly his chief of staff. After a staff reorganization, Reilly was named Deputy Governor with a portfolio including budget development and legislative negotiations. Reilly then left to establish the Metropolitan Pier and Exposition Authority. After Governor Jim Edgar's Chief of Staff Kirk Dillard left the administration to run for the Illinois Senate seat of retiring incumbent Thomas McCracken Jr., Reilly became Edgar's Chief of Staff.

== Death ==
Reilly died on April 4, 2022, at Saint Joseph Villa assisted facility in Chicago, Illinois.
