= Senator Rooney =

Senator Rooney may refer to:

- Fred B. Rooney (1925–2019), Pennsylvania State Senate
- Tom Rooney (Illinois politician) (born 1968), Illinois State Senate
