= Senator Tharp =

Senator Tharp may refer to:

- Kristopher Tharp (fl. 2020s), Illinois State Senate
- William Tharp (1803–1865), Delaware State Senate
