= William R. Haine =

American politician (1944–2021)

Member of the Illinois Senate from the 56th district
- In office November 2002 – January 2019
- Preceded by: Evelyn M. Bowles
- Succeeded by: Rachelle Crowe

Madison County State's Attorney
- In office December 1986 – November 2002
- Preceded by: Dick Allen
- Succeeded by: William A. Mudge

Personal details
- Born: August 8, 1944 Alton, Illinois
- Died: August 16, 2021 (aged 77)
- Party: Democratic
- Spouse: Anna Haine
- Children: Seven Children
- Education: St. Louis University
- Profession: Attorney

Military service
- Allegiance: United States of America
- Branch/service: United States Army
- Years of service: 1967–1969
- Unit: 1st Cavalry Division
- Battles/wars: Vietnam War

William Haine (August 8, 1944 – August 16, 2021) was a Democratic member of the Illinois Senate representing the 56th district from his appointment in November 2002 until 2019.

Prior to his service in the Illinois Senate, he served as a member of the Madison County Board during the 1980s and as the Madison County State's Attorney from 1988 to 2002.

== Background and early education ==
=== Childhood ===
Haine was born on August 8, 1944, in Alton, Illinois, to Mary Alice Moran and James Delos Hoare. James Hoare converted to Catholicism when he married the Irish-Catholic Mary Alice. In 1959 the family name was changed to "Haine". Prior to the change, the four Hoare sons – Jim, John, Bill and Tom – often came to blows with other boys over their phonetically unfortunate surname.

William Haine was first encouraged to take up a career in politics and "make history" by Sister Geraldine, an Ursuline nun at St. Patrick's Grade School in Alton. After graduating from Marquette Catholic High School in 1963, he earned his B.A. from St. Louis University in History in 1967. In both high school and college, he became involved in local and state politics, including the races of Alton Mayor Clyde H. Wiseman, State Senator Paul Simon and U.S. Senator Paul H. Douglas.

=== Military service and law school ===
After college, Haine enlisted in the U.S. Army to serve in Vietnam. He was awarded the Bronze Star for Meritorious Service in Combat Operations after his tour as an enlisted army soldier in the First Cavalry Division (Air Mobile) from 1968 to 1969. He was still politically active while overseas, and from Vietnam he filed as a candidate for Alderman of the City of Alton, losing by only a narrow vote despite being unable to campaign.

After his tour overseas, Haine attended St. Louis University Law School, where he served with distinction on the Board of Editors of the St. Louis Law Review and earned his J.D. in 1974. Two professors who mentored him there, Rev. Joseph Aloysius McCallin, S.J., and Dr. George D. Wendell, also encouraged him to pursue a career in politics.

=== Catholic faith ===
During his law school years, Haine met Anna Schickel, an undergraduate French major at St. Louis University; they were married on August 7, 1971, in the Grailville Oratory in Loveland, Ohio. Haine and his wife have seven children and 33 grandchildren. They continued to reside in Alton, around the corner from his boyhood home (designed by her father, the artist William Schickel). Haine referred to his wedding as the defining moment of his Catholic faith.

== County service ==
After law school, Haine worked as an assistant public defender and maintained a small general practice on the side. He later partnered with trial attorney Randall Bono, and it was during their years together that Haine was elected a Madison County Board member and then State's Attorney.

Already a member of the Madison County Board since 1978, Haine first ran for the office of State's Attorney in 1980. In the Democratic primary he faced former Assistant State's Attorney Dick Allen and incumbent State's Attorney Nick Byron. Though he lost the primary by 313 votes in a county of 260,000, Haine had established a Democratic base with the industrial north end of the county. Republican Don W. Weber, a former Assistant State's Attorney, won the general election in the Reagan landslide of 1980.

=== State's Attorney ===
In 1988, Haine became State's Attorney for Madison County, Illinois, a post he would hold for 14 years. In late 2002, he was appointed to fill the seat of retiring Senator Evelyn M. Bowles.

== State senator ==
After serving several months as an appointed Senator, Haine won re-election in 2002. His legislative record has established him as a pro-life, pro-gun and pro-labor legislator. Haine was an early supporter of Obama within the Democratic primary for U.S. Senator in 2004. He was the chairman of the Insurance Committee.

Among Haine's most controversial bills was the Medical Malpractice Litigation Reform Act, which was supported by hospitals, doctors and nurses but strongly opposed by trial lawyers, including many of his friends in Madison and St. Clair Counties. Haine also was the chief sponsor of the Illinois Methamphetamine Precursor Control Act, the law requiring residents to provide identification when purchasing Sudafed, and limiting their purchases of it. Haine also guided the Compassionate Use of Medical Cannabis Pilot Program Act through the Illinois Senate, though it has not yet passed the House.

More recently, Haine designed and sponsored a bill to enhance flood protection along the Mississippi River in his district. Now signed into law, the bill created a new tax district that can issue sales taxes to fund the renovation of local levees. The bill was supported by the Majority and Minority leaders, Democrat Emil Jones and Republican Frank Watson. Haine has maintained a 100% rating from National Right to Life..

In February 2011, Haine introduced a proposed Illinois constitutional amendment effectively banning same-sex marriage in the state. The proposed amendment, which died in a Senate committee, was widely criticized by activists as being "anti-gay".

Haine announced he would not seek reelection to a sixth term on August 16, 2017. Rachelle Crowe won the election to succeed Haine in 2018.

== Post-Senate career ==
On May 16, 2019, Governor J. B. Pritzker nominated Haine for a position on the Illinois State Board of Elections for a term beginning July 1, 2019, and ending June 30, 2023. The Illinois Senate confirmed Haine unanimously on May 31, 2019.

== Personal life ==
Haine was married to his wife Anna for 50 years. He died at age 77 on August 16, 2021. He is survived by his wife, their seven children, and 33 grandchildren.
