= Senator Bowles =

Senator Bowles may refer to:

- Evelyn M. Bowles (1921–2016), Illinois State Senate
- Skipper Bowles (1919–1986), North Carolina State Senate
