= Ram Villivalam =

American politician

Member of the Illinois Senate from the 8th district
- Incumbent
- Assumed office January 5, 2019
- Preceded by: Ira Silverstein

Personal details
- Born: Chicago, Illinois, U.S.
- Party: Democratic
- Spouse: Elizabeth
- Education: George Washington University (BA)

Ram Villivalam is a Democratic member of the Illinois Senate for the 8th district. The 8th Senate District consists of the Forest Glen, North Park and West Ridge neighborhoods in the City of Chicago and the nearby suburbs of Park Ridge, Morton Grove, Niles, Lincolnwood and Skokie, as of the decennial redistricting following the 2010 United States census.

After Ira Silverstein was accused of sexual misconduct by a lobbyist, Villivalam announced that he would run against Silverstein in the Democratic primary. Villivalam was endorsed by Congresswoman Jan Schakowsky, Congressman Brad Schneider, State Senator Laura Murphy, and Chicago Alderman Ameya Pawar.

In the March 20, 2018 Democratic primary, Villivalam defeated the incumbent Ira Silverstein by more than 20 points in the first competitive primary the latter had faced since taking the seat. Silverstein resigned a few days before the start of the 101st General Assembly, allowing Villivalam to be sworn on January 5, 2019.

Villivalam is the first Asian American, Indian American, and Telugu American elected to the Illinois Senate. (Note: Yadav Nathwani is the first Asian-American and Indian-American member of the Illinois Senate. However, he was appointed after the 2018 general election to serve the remaining six weeks of outgoing Senator Chris Nybo's term. This was 39 days before Villivalam was sworn into office.)

Prior to joining the Illinois Senate, Villivalam was the former political director for Brad Schneider and former legislative coordinator for SEIU Healthcare-Illinois. He co-founded the Progressive Turnout Project PAC in 2015.

In September 2019, Villivalam succeeded Robert Murphy as the Democratic Party committeeperson for Chicago's 39th ward.

As of July 2022, Senator Villivalam is a member of the following Illinois Senate committees:

- (Chairman of) Appropriations - Government Infrastructure Committee (SAPP-SAGI)
- Appropriations - Human Services Committee (SENE)
- Healthcare Access and Availability Committee (SHAA)
- Human Rights Committee (SHUM)
- Licensed Activities Committee (SLIC)
- Licensed Activities - Special Issues Committee (SLIC-SLSI)
- Pensions Committee (SPEN)
- (Chairman of) Redistricting - Chicago Northwest Committee (SRED-SRNW)
- (Chairman of) Transportation Committee (STRN)
