= Suzy Glowiak =

American politician

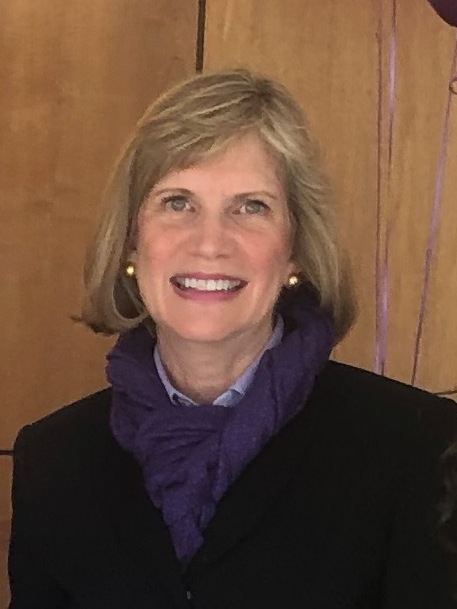
- Glowiak Hilton in 2019

Member of the Illinois Senate from the 23rd district
- Incumbent
- Assumed office January 9, 2019
- Preceded by: Yadav Nathwani

Personal details
- Party: Democratic
- Education: Illinois Institute of Technology (BS); Northwestern University (MS)
- Profession: Manufacturing engineer

Suzanne Glowiak Hilton is a Democratic member of the Illinois Senate from the 23rd district. The 23rd district includes all or parts of Clarendon Hills, Downers Grove, Elmhurst, Glen Ellyn, Hinsdale, Lisle, Lombard, Oak Brook, Villa Park, Western Springs, Westmont, and Willowbrook. Glowiak narrowly defeated Republican incumbent Chris Nybo in the 2018 general election. She took office January 9, 2019.

Prior to her election to the Illinois Senate, Glowiak served two terms as a member of the Western Springs Board of Trustees.

As of April 2023, Senator Glowiak is a member of the following Illinois Senate committees:

- Licensed Activities (chair)
- Transportation
- Energy and Public Utilities
- Special Committee on Pensions
- Approp- Health and Human

== Electoral history ==
Illinois 23rd State Senate District Democratic Primary, 2014
Party	Candidate	Votes	%
Democratic	Suzanne Glowiak	3,661	100.0
Total votes		3,661	100.0

Illinois 23rd State Senate District General Election, 2014
Party	Candidate	Votes	%
Republican	Chris Nybo	47,590	60.28
Democratic	Suzanne Glowiak	31,357	39.72
Total votes		78,947	100.0

Illinois 23rd State Senate District Democratic Primary, 2018
Party	Candidate	Votes	%
Democratic	Suzanne Glowiak	20,984	100.0
Total votes		20,984	100.0

Illinois 23rd State Senate District General Election, 2018
Party	Candidate	Votes	%
Democratic	Suzanne Glowiak	51,695	50.8
Republican	Chris Nybo (incumbent)	50,059	49.2
Total votes		101,754	100.0
