= Yadav Nathwani =

American politician

Member of the Illinois Senate from the 24th district
- In office November 2018 – January 2019
- Preceded by: Chris Nybo
- Succeeded by: Suzy Glowiak

Personal details
- Party: Republican
- Education: Benedictine University
- Profession: Chief financial officer

Yadav "Nick" Nathwani (born August 15, 1983) is an American politician and former Republican member of the Illinois Senate from the 24th district. The district includes all or parts of Clarendon Hills, Downers Grove, Elmhurst, Glen Ellyn, Hinsdale, Lisle, Lombard, Oak Brook, Villa Park, Western Springs, Westmont, and Willowbrook.

Nathwani was appointed to serve out the remaining 6 weeks left Chris Nybo term of office when he resigned after his defeat in November 2018 to Suzy Glowiak for Illinois Senate. Suzy Glowiak, took office on January 7, 2019.

At the time of his temporary appointment to the Illinois legislature Nathwani was a trustee of Milton Township, as well as a Milton Township Republican committeeman. He was chosen fill the balance of Chris Nybo's term by the DuPage County Republican Central Committee.

Nathwani was the first Indian-American to serve in the Illinois State Senate having been appointed to a six-week lame duck session before Ram Villivalam, the first Indian-American elected to the Illinois Senate, took office.

== Education and career ==
Nathwani earned his bachelor's degree and his MBA from Benedictine University in Lisle, Illinois.

He was elected as a trustee to Glenbard High School District 87 and served from 2009 until 2013. In 2013, he was elected to be a trustee for Milton Township. He won re-election in 2017, serving until 2021. In 2021 he was elected Miltion Township Clerk, losing reelection in 2025 to the Democratic candidate.

Nathwani serves as chief financial officer for Professional Paving and Concrete Company and had previously worked at a local bank.
