= Judy Biggert =

American politician and attorney (born 1937)

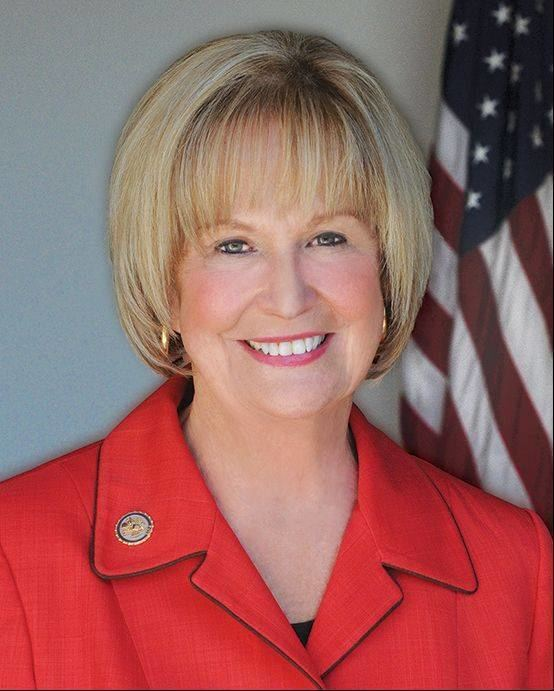
- Official portrait, 2012

Member of the U.S. House of Representatives from Illinois's 13th district
- In office January 3, 1999 – January 3, 2013
- Preceded by: Harris Fawell
- Succeeded by: Bill Foster (redistricted)

Member of the Illinois House of Representatives from the 81st district
- In office January 13, 1993 – January 3, 1999
- Preceded by: Thomas McCracken
- Succeeded by: Patti Bellock

Personal details
- Born: Judith Gail Borg; August 15, 1937 (age 89) Chicago, Illinois, U.S.
- Party: Republican
- Spouse: Rody Biggert (died 2018)
- Children: 4
- Education: Stanford University (BA); Northwestern University (JD)

Judith Gail Biggert (née Borg; born August 15, 1937) is an American politician and attorney. She is the former U.S. representative for Illinois's 13th congressional district, serving from 1999 to 2013. She is a member of the Republican Party.

Biggert was defeated in her 2012 re-election bid by former US Congressman Bill Foster. She was also the last Republican woman elected to Congress from Illinois until the election of Mary Miller of the 15th congressional district in 2020.

Prior to serving in Congress, she served in the Illinois House of Representatives from 1993 to 1998. After leaving Congress, she was appointed to serve on the Illinois Education Labor Relations Board.

== Early life, education and career ==
Biggert was born Judith Gail Borg in Chicago on August 15, 1937, the second of four children of Alvin Andrew Borg and Marjorie Virginia (Mailler) Borg. Her father worked for the Chicago-based Walgreen Co., the largest drugstore chain in the United States, for 41 years from 1928 to 1969, and served as its president from 1963 to 1969, succeeding Charles R. Walgreen Jr. and succeeded by Charles R. Walgreen III. Her paternal grandparents immigrated from Finland and her maternal family is of English descent.

She grew up in Wilmette, Illinois, a North Shore Chicago suburb, and graduated from New Trier High School in 1955, then went to Stanford University, where she received a B.A. in international relations in 1959, then worked for a year in a women's apparel store. She then attended Northwestern University School of Law where she was an editor of the Northwestern University Law Review from 1961 to 1963, earned a J.D. in 1963, then clerked for federal judge Luther Merritt Swygert of the U.S. Court of Appeals for the Seventh Circuit from 1963 to 1964.

Biggert left her federal court law clerkship to have her children, but later did some legal work from her home for family and friends on wills, trusts, and real estate. She served on numerous boards of voluntary and civic organizations.

== Early community involvement and political career ==
Biggert was elected to the Hinsdale Township High School District 86 Board of Education in 1978 and was a board member until 1985, serving as president from 1983 to 1985. She served as chairman of the Hinsdale Plan Commission from 1989 to 1993. She also became active in Chicago community organizations, serving as chair of the Visiting Nurses Association and as president of the Junior League.

In 1992, Biggert was elected to the Illinois House of Representatives to serve the redrawn 81st District. She was re-elected in 1994 and 1996 before running for Congress in 1998.

== U.S. House of Representatives ==
=== Committee assignments ===
- Committee on Education and the Workforce
  - Subcommittee on Early Childhood, Elementary, and Secondary Education
  - Subcommittee on Higher Education and Workforce Training
- Committee on Financial Services
  - Subcommittee on Capital Markets, Insurance, and Government-Sponsored Enterprises
  - Subcommittee on Insurance, Housing and Community Opportunity (Chair)
- Committee on Science, Space and Technology
  - Subcommittee on Energy and Environment
  - Subcommittee on Technology and Innovation

=== Caucus memberships ===
- Co-Chair of the Caucus on Women's Issues
- Republican Main Street Partnership

=== Voting record ===
==== Interest group ratings ====
	ACLU	ACU	ADA	AFL–CIO	AFSCME	ChC	CfG	Con	FRC	ITIC	LCV	NTLC^{*}	NTU	USCC
1999	–	60	30	11	16	–		21		–	31	–	59	96
2000	50	68	20	0	0	60		5		94	26	70	56	100
2001	–	56	20	17	10	–		–		–	21	–	61	100
2002	53	84	15	11	0	50		58		100	38	73	59	100
2003	–	60	10	13	13	–				–	25	–	59	100
2004	30	64	35	13	0	61				100	18	70	60	100
2005	–	60	20	13	0		61		54	–	22		53	89
2006	41	64	30	21	0		54		0	100	33		59	93
2007	–	68	30	42	18		67		–	–	55		65	85
2008	27	84	35	20	14		65		35	71	38		63	94
2009	–	80	20	13	22		77			–	29		73	95

^{*} NTLC – National Tax-Limitation Committee

==== Key votes ====
106th Congress (1999–2000)

Vote	Bill
Yes	Kill proposal to take aviation trust funds off budget
Yes	Permit state and local governments to display the Ten Commandments on public property
Yes	Require background checks on buyers only at gun shows with 10 or more vendors
Yes	Remove barriers among banking, securities and insurance companies
Yes	Ban "partial-birth" abortions
Yes	Halt funding for U.S. mission in Kosovo unless European nations pay more
Yes	Provide Medicare benefits to military retirees and their dependents
Yes	Grant China permanent normal trade status
Yes	Phase out estate, gift and trust taxes
Yes	Approve GOP plan to provide prescription drug coverage for Medicare beneficiaries
Yes	Drop enforcement of the U.S. economic embargo of Cuba
No	Impose steel import quotas
No	Bar funding for Food and Drug Administration review of the RU-486 drug for inducement of abortion
No	Authorize state grants to hire teachers and reduce class size
No	Overhaul campaign finance laws; ban "soft money" and restrict advocacy advertising
No	Approve bipartisan plan to increase rights of patients in managed-care health plans
No	Raise hourly minimum wage by $1 over two years
No	Prohibit implementation of president's national monument designations
No	Increase help for poor nations indebted to international financial institutions

107th Congress (2001–2002)

Vote	Bill
Yes	Nullify Clinton Labor Department ergonomics rule
Yes	Approve Bush tax cuts of $1.35 trillion through fiscal 2011
Yes	Permit federal incentives for social services provided by religious organizations
Yes	Bar funds for the District of Columbia to enforce anti-discrimination ruling against the Boy Scouts for expelling two gay Scouts
Yes	Approve Bush proposal to limit managed-care plan liability for coverage decisions
Yes	Divert money from crop subsidy payments to land conservation
Yes	Expand law enforcement power to investigate suspected terrorists
Yes	Back Bush's defense budget increase
Yes	Extend 1996 welfare law
Yes	Bar funds for the International Criminal Court
Yes	Adopt Bush's discretionary spending limit
Yes	Pass GOP Medicare prescription drug plan
Yes	Permit commercial airline pilots to carry firearms and use force during a flight
Yes	Ban "partial-birth" abortion
Yes	Revive fast-track procedures for trade agreements
Yes	Authorize war against Iraq
Yes	Advance bankruptcy overhaul opposed by abortion opponents
No	Maintain ban on oil drilling in Arctic National Wildlife Refuge
No	Overhaul campaign finance law; ban "soft money" and restrict advocacy advertising
No	Create independent Sep 11 commission
No	Extend union protection to Homeland Security Department employees

108th Congress (2003–2004)

Vote	Bill
Yes	Restrict liability lawsuits against manufacturers and sellers of firearms and ammunition
Yes	Permit oil drilling in 2,000 acres (8.1 km^{2}) of the Arctic National Wildlife Refuge
Yes	Approve Bush tax cuts of $330 billion through fiscal 2013
Yes	Do not allow use of search warrants without first notifying suspects
Yes	Ban "partial birth" abortion except to save a woman's life
Yes	Approve fiscal 2004 supplemental appropriations bill providing $87 billion for U.S. military operations and reconstruction aid to Iraq and Afghanistan
Yes	Overhaul Medicare and create prescription drug benefit
Yes	Pass $293.2 billion, six-year federal highway and mass transit bill
Yes	Prohibit funds to enforce the economic embargo of Cuba
Yes	Approve $146 billion multi-year extension of previously enacted middle-class tax breaks
Yes	Cut corporate taxes $137 billion over 10 years
Yes	Reorganize U.S. intelligence agencies as proposed by Sep 11 commission
No	Ban human cloning and impose criminal sanctions
No	Block Bush rule scaling back overtime pay for some white collar federal workers
No	Allow importation of prescription drugs
No	Create private school voucher program in Washington, D.C.
No	Split $18.6 billion in Iraq aid into half-grant, half-loan
No	Extend federal unemployment benefits by 13 weeks
No	Bar funds to implement new federal regulations for overtime pay
No	Amend the Constitution to prohibit same-sex marriage

109th Congress (2005–2006)

Vote	Bill
Yes	Intervene in the life-support case of Terri Schiavo
Yes	Permanently repeal federal estate and gift taxes
Yes	Lift President Bush's restrictions on stem cell research funding
Yes	Reauthorize the USA PATRIOT Act, and make permanent most of its provisions for expanded law-enforcement authority to investigate potential terrorists
Yes	Approve the Central American Free Trade Agreement (CAFTA) with five Central American countries
Yes	Pass energy policy overhaul favored by President Bush emphasizing domestic oil and gas production
Yes	Ban torture of prisoners in American custody
Yes	Approve fiscal 2006 budget reconciliation legislation to curb entitlement spending
Yes	Authorize oil and gas leases for Alaska's Arctic National Wildlife Refuge
Yes	Affirm U.S. commitment to war in Iraq and reject setting a withdrawal date for troops
Yes	Permit U.S. sale of civilian nuclear technology to India
Yes	Build a 700-mile (1,100 km) fence on the U.S.-Mexico border to curb illegal immigration
Yes	Create military tribunals to try detainees described as unlawful enemy combatants
No	Bar transportation of a minor girl across state lines to obtain an abortion without parental consent
No	Prohibit FBI access to library and bookstore records
No	End mandatory preservation of habitat of endangered animal and plant species
No	Stop broadband companies from favoring select Internet traffic
No	Repeal requirement for bilingual ballots at the polls
No	Amend the Constitution to define marriage as the union of a man and a woman

110th Congress (2007–2008)

Vote	Bill
Yes	Increase minimum wage by $2.10 an hour to $7.25 per hour in two years from $5.15 per hour
Yes	Affirm U.S. commitment to war in Iraq and reject setting a withdrawal date for troops
Yes	Bar funds to state or local governments that refuse to share information on immigrant status with the Immigration and Customs Enforcement Bureau
Yes	Override Bush veto of $23.2 billion water projects authorization bill
Yes	Prohibit job discrimination on the basis of a person's sexual orientation
Yes	Implement Peru free-trade agreement
Yes	Approve energy policy overhaul with new fuel economy standards
Yes	Clear $473.5 billion omnibus spending bill, including $70 billion for military operations
Yes	Overhaul surveillance laws and permit dismissal of suits against companies that conducted warrantless wiretapping
Yes	Grant mortgage relief to homeowners and funding for Fannie Mac and Freddie Mac
Yes	Repeal the District of Columbia's local laws that prohibit possession of firearms
Yes	Approve final $700 billion program to stabilize financial markets
No	Approve $124.2 billion in emergency war spending and set goal for redeployment of troops from Iraq
No	Bar the use of military funds for contingency operations in Iran
No	Reject federal contraceptive assistance to international family planning groups
No	Delay consideration of Colombia free-trade agreement
No	Override Bush veto of federal farm and nutrition programs reauthorization bill
No	Reauthorize and expand the State Children's Health Insurance Program (SCHIP)
No	Approve initial $700 billion program to stabilize financial markets
No	Provide $14 billion in loans to automakers

111th Congress, 1st Session (2009)

Vote	Bill
Yes	Authorize the Food and Drug Administration to regulate tobacco products
Yes	Rule for floor debate on the fiscal 2010 Commerce-Justice-Science appropriations bill that restricted the number of amendments to the bill that could be offered
Yes	Comprehensive food safety bill, after a string of food-borne illnesses shook the public's confidence and left key industry players searching for ways to reassure consumers
Yes	Cash for clunkers – replenish a federal fund that offered as much as $4,500 to car owners who traded in fuel-inefficient vehicles for newer, more fuel efficient vehicles
Yes	Stupak amendment to health reform legislation to restrict insurance coverage for abortions
No	State Children's Health Insurance Program (SCHIP) expansion
No	Economic stimulus – $787 billion bill to help stimulate the economy through a combination of spending and tax cuts
No	Mortgage loan modification – allow bankruptcy judges to write down the principal and interest rates of existing loans to a home's current market value
No	Climate change mitigation – create a cap and trade system to limit emissions of greenhouse gases; require electric utilities to produce some of their power from renewable sources
No	Student loan overhaul – establish the government as the sole provider of student loans and provide billions of dollars in savings toward various scholarship and education programs
No	Health care reform legislation aimed at insuring most Americans and paid for with a controversial combination of reductions in Medicare spending and tax increases

111th Congress, 2nd Session (2010)

Vote	Bill
Yes	Continuing Extension Act of 2010 – $18 billion unemployment benefits extension to June 2, 2010
Yes	Allow repeal of "Don't ask, don't tell" policy 60 days after receipt of Pentagon recommendations due December 1, 2010
No	Patient Protection and Affordable Care Act / Health Care and Education Reconciliation Act of 2010
No	Dodd–Frank Wall Street Reform and Consumer Protection Act
No	Unemployment Compensation Extension Act of 2010 – $34 billion unemployment benefits extension to November 30, 2010
No	Aid to states – $26 billion to fund education jobs and Medicaid
No	Small Business Jobs and Credit Act of 2010 – $42 billion to provide capital to small banks and tax cuts for small businesses

== Political positions ==
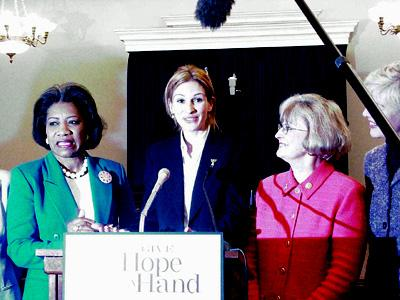
Julia Roberts with Judy Biggert at the United States Capitol.

Judy Biggert is a moderate Republican. She was a member of The Republican Main Street Partnership and Republicans for Choice.

=== Abortion ===
Biggert supports abortion rights. She supports embryonic stem-cell research. She was given a 50% rating from NARAL Pro-Choice America and a 67% rating from Planned Parenthood, which both support legal abortion, a 100% rating from Population Connection, an anti-abortion organization which supports voluntary family planning, and a 50% rating from the anti-abortion National Right to Life Committee which opposes access to legal abortion.

=== Taxes ===
Biggert was one of 171 of the 178 Republican U.S. House members in the 111th Congress to have signed Grover Norquist's Americans for Tax Reform Taxpayer Protection Pledge:

Biggert supported making all of the Bush tax cuts permanent, regardless of income.

=== Social security, healthcare, and Medicaid ===
Biggert supported the partial privatization of Social Security, in which individuals could choose to voluntarily divert 2% of their Social Security tax payments from paying Social Security beneficiaries into individual private accounts which they could invest in the stock market and which they could pass on to their heirs.

Biggert supported the repeal (or defunding to prevent implementation) of the 2010 Democratic health care reform and its replacement with Republican health care reform.

Biggert opposed allowing individuals less than 65 years of age to buy into Medicare.

=== Illegal immigration ===
Biggert opposed any comprehensive immigration reform that provides a path to citizenship for illegal immigrants and supports efforts against illegal immigration. .

=== Campaign finance ===
Biggert opposed public financing of federal election campaigns, and supported the elimination of all limits on campaign contributions with immediate and full disclosure of contributions.

=== Same-sex marriage and LGBT issues ===
Biggert voted against the 2006 Federal Marriage Amendment, a proposed constitutional amendment intended to ban gay marriage. She supported repealing the "Don't Ask, Don't Tell" policy, but opposed repealing the Defense of Marriage Act which prohibited federal recognition of same-sex marriages. In 2012, she was given a 70% rating from the Human Rights Campaign, a political action committee which supports same-sex marriage and other gay rights, and she was given a 100% rating by PFLAG, or Parents, Families, and Friends of Lesbians and Gays.

== Political campaigns ==
=== 1998 ===
In 1998, Biggert narrowly defeated (45%-40%) conservative state Senator Peter Roskam in the Republican primary, the real contest in this ancestrally Republican district. In the general she earned 61% of the vote to win the seat opened up by the retirement of U. S. Representative Harris Fawell. In 2006, Roskam was elected to Congress from another district.

=== 2006 ===
In 2006, Biggert's share of the vote in the general election fell below 60% (58%) for the first time in her Congressional career.

=== 2008 ===
In 2008, Biggert received less than 54% of the vote overall (and less than 50% of the vote in Will County) in winning reelection to her sixth term in Congress. For the first time, she faced a financially competitive Democratic opponent, businessman Scott Harper, the first reasonably well-financed Democrat to run in the district or its predecessors in decades. In 2008, Democratic U.S. Sen. Dick Durbin was reelected with 60% of the vote and Democrat Barack Obama won 54% of the vote in the 13th Congressional District, with even Biggert's Republican predecessor, Fawell, supporting Obama.

=== 2010 ===
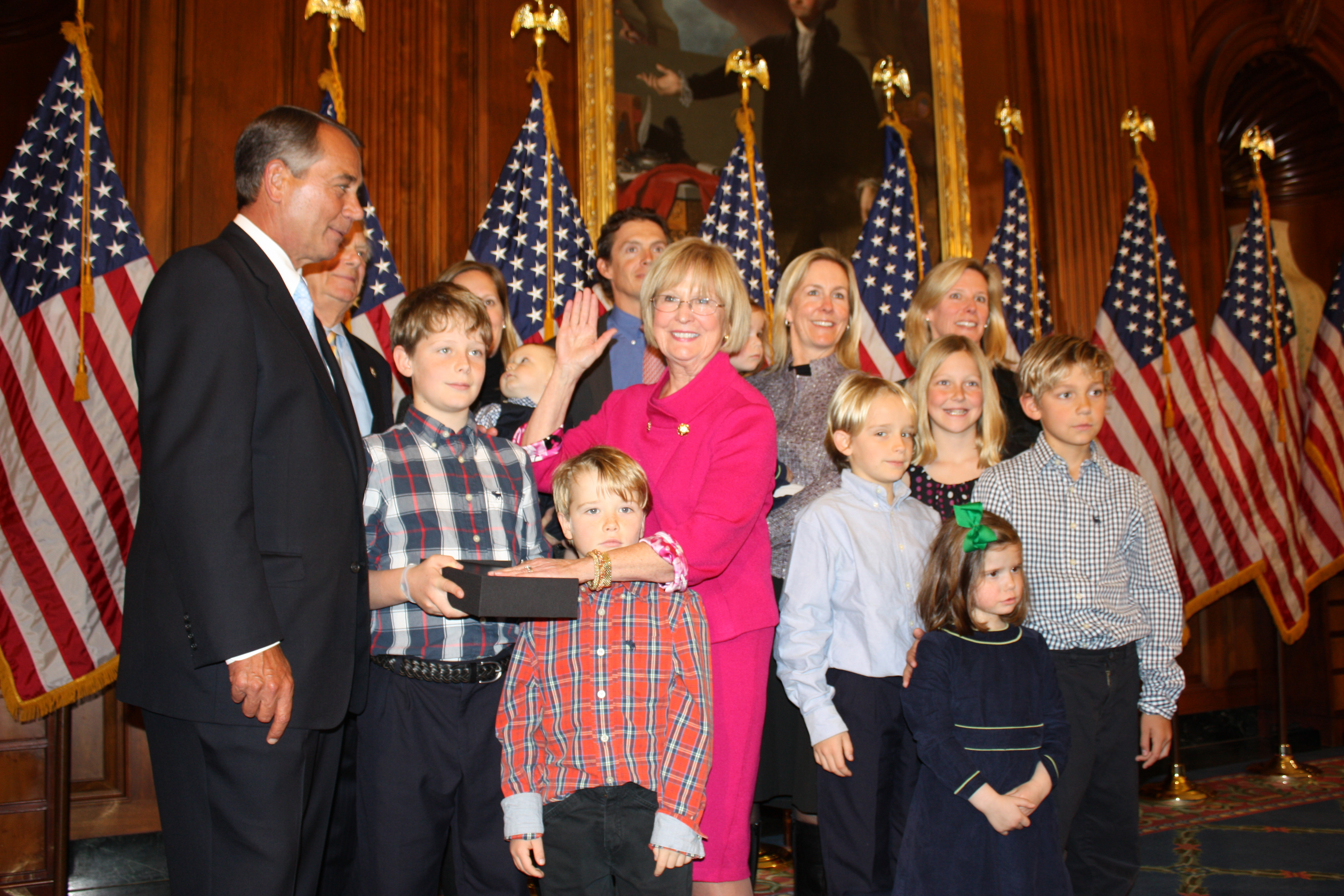
Biggert taking the oath of office after her 2010 re-election.

Biggert won re-election.

=== 2012 ===
In the redistricting following the 2010 census, the Democratic-controlled state legislature significantly altered Illinois's congressional map, splitting Biggert's district. Her district was renumbered as the 11th District, and made significantly more Democratic even though it contains 50 percent of Biggert's former territory. A portion of her former district that included Biggert's home in Hinsdale was combined with the heavily Democratic Chicago North Side-based 5th District. Biggert opted to run in the new 11th against the Democratic nominee, former 14th District Congressman Bill Foster.

== Electoral history ==
=== Illinois House, 81st Representative District (1992–1996) ===
- 1992 Republican primary
  - Judy Biggert – 5,284 (38%)
  - James P. McCarthy – 3,498 (25%)
  - Todd Vandermyde – 1,861 (13%)
  - Andrew J. (Andy) Clark – 1,758 (12%)
  - John Curry – 1,684 (12%)
- 1992 general election
  - Judy Biggert (R) – 28,655 (69%)
  - David M. Briggs (D) – 12,918 (31%)
- 1994 Republican primary
  - Judy Biggert – 6,100 (54%)
  - James P. McCarthy – 5,219 (46%)
- 1994 general election
  - Judy Biggert (R) – 22,227 (78.51%)
  - Bill Chalberg (D) – 6,085 (21%)
- 1996 Republican primary
  - Judy Biggert – 14,142 (100%)
- 1996 general election
  - Judy Biggert (R) – 28,597 (71%)
  - Dave Brockway (D) – 11,573 (29%)

=== U.S. House, Illinois 13th Congressional District (1998–2010) ===
- 1998 Republican primary
  - Judy Biggert – 24,482 (45%)
  - Peter Roskam – 21,784 (40%)
  - David J. Shestokas – 2,574 (5%)
  - Michael J. Krzyston – 2,566 (5%)
  - Andrew J. Clark – 1,926 (4%)
  - Walter Marksym – 1,035 (2%)
- 1998 general election
  - Judy Biggert (R) – 121,889 (61%) $1,294,853^{*}
  - Susan W. Hynes (D) – 77,878 (39%) $222,656^{*}
- 2000 Republican primary
  - Judy Biggert – 39,121 (100%)
- 2000 general election
  - Judy Biggert (R) – 193,250 (66%) $381,623^{*}
  - Thomas Mason (D) – 98,768 (34%)
- 2002 Republican primary
  - Judy Biggert – 70,691 (100%)
- 2002 general election
  - Judy Biggert (R) – 139,456 (70%) $464,054^{*}
  - Tom Mason (D) – 59,069 (30%)
- 2004 Republican primary
  - Judy Biggert – 46,861 (>99%)
  - Bob Hart (write-in) – 231 (<1%)
- 2004 general election
  - Judy Biggert (R) – 200,472 (65%) $542,733^{*}
  - Gloria Schor Andersen (D) – 107,836 (35%) $42,129^{*}
  - Mark Alan Mastrogiovanni (write-in) – 4 (0%)
- 2006 Republican primary
  - Judy Biggert – 52,900 (80%)
  - Bob Hart – 13,564 (20%)
- 2006 general election
  - Judy Biggert (R) – 119,720 (58%) $1,014,819^{*}
  - Joseph Shannon (D) – 85,507 (42%) $225,842^{*}
  - Mark Alan Mastrogiovanni (write-in) – 7 (0%)
- 2008 Republican primary
  - Judy Biggert – 58,533 (77%)
  - Sean O'Kane – 17,206 (23%)
- 2008 general election
  - Judy Biggert (R) – 180,888 (54%) $1,585,536^{*}
  - Scott Harper (D) – 147,430 (44%) $1,070,201^{*}
  - Steve Alesch (Green) – 9,402 (3%)
  - Theodore Knapp (write-in) – 51 (0%)
- 2010 Republican primary
  - Judy Biggert – 58,294 (100%)
- 2010 general election
  - Judy Biggert (R) – $1,450,000^{**}
  - Scott Harper (D) – $621,000^{**}

^{*} campaign expenditures
^{**} campaign contributions (through September 30, 2010)

== Post-congressional career ==
On April 23, 2015, Illinois Governor Bruce Rauner appointed Biggert to the Education Labor Relations Board, which oversees the negotiation of teacher contracts.

== Personal life ==
On September 21, 1963, she married Rody Patterson Biggert, Jr. Rody and Judy Biggert lived in Chicago, then Wilmette, before moving to Hinsdale in 1971, when Rody's mother sold them her home, the extensively remodeled 1864 mansion of Hinsdale's founder, William Robbins, in the Robbins Park Historic District. The Biggerts have four children: Courtney Caverly, Alison Cabot, Rody Biggert, and Adrienne Morrell, and nine grandchildren. Her husband, Rody, died in November 2018 after an 18-month long struggle with leukemia at the age of 82.

Since 2004, Biggert's youngest daughter Adrienne Morrell has been a registered lobbyist for Health Net, the sixth largest publicly traded for-profit managed healthcare company; previously Morrell was a lobbyist with America's Health Insurance Plans (AHIP), the chief health insurance industry lobby, after having served as an aide to former seven-term Illinois 13th District U.S. Rep. Harris Fawell, Biggert's predecessor in Congress.

In 2008, multimillionaire Biggert was the second wealthiest—after U.S. Rep. Bill Foster (D-14)—in Illinois's 21-member Congressional delegation, and the 82nd wealthiest member in the U.S. House.

Biggert was president of the Junior Board of the Chicago Travelers Aid Society in 1969, and president of the Junior League of Chicago from 1976 to 1978, chairman of board of directors of the Visiting Nurse Association of Chicago in 1978, and president of the Oak School elementary school PTA in Hinsdale from 1976 to 1978. She was a member of the board of directors of the Salt Creek Ballet from 1990 to 1998. She was also a Sunday school teacher at Grace Episcopal Church in Hinsdale from 1974 to 1984, and an American Youth Soccer Organization assistant soccer coach in 1983.

== See also ==
- Women in the United States House of Representatives

U.S. House of Representatives
Preceded by Harris Fawell	Member of the U.S. House of Representatives from Illinois's 13th congressional district 1999–2013	Succeeded by Rodney Davis
Preceded by Sue Kelly	Chair of the Congressional Women's Caucus; 2001–2003	Succeeded by Shelley Moore Capito
U.S. order of precedence (ceremonial)
Preceded by Jerry Weller as Former U.S. Representative	Order of precedence of the United States as Former U.S. Representative	Succeeded by Ronnie Flippo as Former U.S. Representative
