= Michele Clark (politician) =

American politician

Member-elect of the Illinois Senate from the 33rd district
- Assuming office January 2027
- Succeeding: Don DeWitte

Personal details
- Party: Democratic

Michele Clark is an American politician. A member of the Democratic Party, she is the member-elect for the 33rd district of the Illinois Senate.
