= Marsia Geldert-Murphey =

American politician

Member of the Illinois Senate from the 56th district
- Member-elect
- Assumed office January 13, 2027
- Preceded by: Erica Harriss

Personal details
- Party: Democratic
- Website: Campaign website

Marsia 'Marsie' Geldert-Murphey is an American politician. A member of the Democratic Party, she was elected to the Illinois Senate in 2026, representing the 56th district. She unseated incumbent Republican Erica Harriss in the 2026 election.
