= Don DeWitte =

American politician

Member of the Illinois Senate from the 33rd district
- Incumbent
- Assumed office September 2018
- Preceded by: Karen McConnaughay
- Succeeded by: Michele Clark (elect)

Personal details
- Party: Republican
- Spouse: Diane
- Children: 2
- Education: Elgin Community College, University of Illinois Springfield
- Website: https://senatordewitte.com

Donald P. DeWitte is a Republican member of the Illinois Senate for the 33rd District.

The 33rd district includes all or parts of Batavia, Crystal Lake, East Dundee, Elgin, Gilberts, Lakewood, Pingree Grove, Sleepy Hollow, South Elgin, Wayne, Geneva, St. Charles, West Dundee, Hampshire, Huntley, Carpentersville, Lake in the Hills and Algonquin.

Prior to his appointment to the Illinois State Senate, DeWitte served as Mayor of St. Charles from 2005 to 2013, and as a St. Charles alderman from 1993 to 2005. He also served as the Kane County representative to the Regional Transportation Authority Board from 2013 to 2018.

DeWitte's currently serves on the following committees: Appropriations; Human Rights; Revenue (Minority Spokesperson); State Government; Transportation (Minority Spokesperson); Special Committee on Pensions.

== Illinois Senate ==
In 2018, DeWitte was appointed to the Illinois State Senate to represent the 33rd District after incumbent Senator Karen McConnaughay resigned. He was sworn in in September 2018 and was elected to the position in November 2018, narrowly defeating Democrat Nancy Zettler.

In 2021, DeWitte became an assistant Republican leader.

=== Votes ===
==== Workers' rights ====
- Voted against raising the state minimum wage to $15 an hour
- Voted against prohibiting Right To Work Laws
- Voted against HB 834, which required employees to be paid equally

==== Voting rights ====
- Voted against allowing people in jail who have not been convicted of a crime to vote
- Voted in favor of SB-1970, which authorized student absences for voting
- Voted against expanding absentee voting for the 2020 general election

==== Education ====
- Voted against SB-25, which would have made kindergarten mandatory for five year-olds in Illinois
- Voted against SB 10, which increased the mandatory baseline salaries for public school teachers in the state
- Voted against HB 2691, which authorized tuition assistance to students who are trans or undocumented
- Voted against HB 2265, which requires civics education to be taught in grades 6, 7, and 8
- Voted against HB 246, which requires public schools to teach about prominent LGBTQ+ historical figures
- Voted against HB 2170, which requires school curriculum to emphasize Black and minority group contributions
- Voted against prohibiting school discrimination against certain hairstyles

==== Police and prison policy ====
- Voted against HB 1613, which requires police to keep records on racial profiling
- Voted against allowing people in jail who have not been convicted of a crime to vote
- Voted against HB 2040, which prohibits private prisons and jails in Illinois
- Voted against abolishing cash bail

==== LGBTQ+ rights ====
- Voted against HB 246, which requires public schools to teach about prominent LGBTQ+ historical figures
- Voted against HB 3534, which added a nonbinary gender marker option for state ID's

==== Cannabis ====
- Voted against HB 1438, which legalized recreational cannabis in Illinois

==== Racial justice ====
- Voted against requiring women and Black people to serve on corporate boards
- Voted against HB 1613, which requires police to keep records on racial profiling
- Voted against HB 2170, which requires school curriculum to emphasize Black and minority group contributions
- Voted against HB 158, which aims to reduce racial disparities in medical care
- Voted against prohibiting school discrimination against certain hairstyles

==== Immigration ====
- Voted against SB 667, which would have prohibited cities and counties from entering into contracts with Immigration and Customs Enforcement

==== Climate and energy ====
- Voted against requiring all energy production to be from renewable sources by 2050

==== Health care and abortion ====
- Voted against repealing the Parental Notice of Abortion Act
- Voted against HB 158, which aims to reduce racial disparities in medical care

=== Committee assignments ===
In the 101st General Assembly, DeWitte served on the Senate Committees on Appropriations II; Education, Revenue, Local Government, Telecommunications and InfoTechnology; Transportation; Government Accountability and Pensions; and the Committee of the Whole.

In the 102nd General Assembly, he serves on the Senate Committees on Appropriations; Behavioral and Mental Health; Commerce; Executive; Local Government; Pensions; Revenue; Transportation; and Administrative Rules.

== Electoral history ==
Illinois State Senate District 33, General Election 2018
Party	Candidate	Votes	%
Republican	Don DeWitte	46,040	50.6
Democratic	Nancy Zettler	44,965	49.4
Total votes		91,005	100.0

Illinois State Senate District 33, General Election 2022
Party	Candidate	Votes	%
Republican	Don DeWitte	56,883	100.0
Total votes		56,883	100.0

== Personal life ==
DeWitte attended Elgin Community College and the University of Illinois at Springfield before beginning a four decades-long career in the building materials industry, serving in various positions with local and national manufacturers, primarily in kitchen design and sales.

DeWitte and his wife Diane have two children and are members of St. Patrick Church in St. Charles.
