= Ann Gillespie (politician) =

American politician (born 1958/59)

Member of the Illinois Senate from the 27th district
- In office January 9, 2019 – April 14, 2024
- Preceded by: Tom Rooney
- Succeeded by: Mark L. Walker

Personal details
- Born: 1958 or 1959 (age 66–67)
- Party: Democratic
- Education: University of Illinois (B.A.); DePaul University (J.D.)
- Profession: Attorney (retired)

Ann Gillespie is a former Democratic member of the Illinois Senate for the 27th district. The district, located in the Chicago metropolitan area, includes parts of Arlington Heights, Hoffman Estates, Des Plaines, Mount Prospect, Rolling Meadows, Barrington, Inverness, Palatine, Prospect Heights and South Barrington.

== Early life and career ==
Gillespie, a retired healthcare attorney from Arlington Heights, has a B.A. in History from University of Illinois Urbana-Champaign and a J.D. from the DePaul University College of Law.

== Illinois Senate ==
In the 2018 general election, Gillespie defeated incumbent Republican senator Tom Rooney. As of July 2022, Senator Gillespie is a member of the following Illinois Senate committees:

- Appropriations - Constitutional Offices Committee (SAPP-SACO)
- Appropriations - Health Committee (SAPP-SAHA)
- Commerce Committee
- (Chairwoman of) Ethics Committee (SETH)
- Insurance Committee (SINS)
- Local Government Committee (SLGV)
- (Chairwoman of) Redistricting - Northwest Cook County Committee (SRED-SRNC)
- Subcommittee on Managed Care Organizations (SHEA-SMCO)
- (Chairwoman of) Subcommittee on Medicaid (SHEA-SHMD)
- Subcommittee on Special Issues (H) (SHEA-SHSI)

On April 8, 2024, it was announced that Governor J.B. Pritzker would appoint Gillespie the director of the Illinois Department of Insurance, and she resigned effective April 14, 2024.
