= Emil Jones III =

American politician

Emil Jones
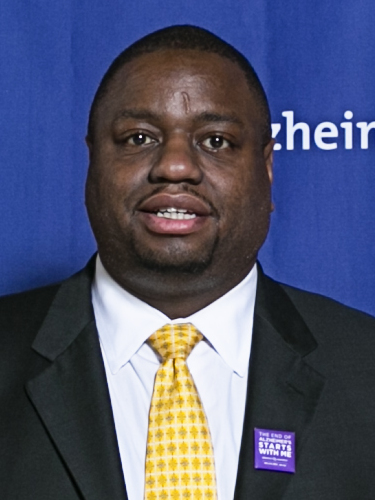

Member of the Illinois Senate from the 14th district
- Incumbent
- Assumed office January 14, 2009
- Preceded by: Emil Jones Jr.

Personal details
- Born: May 16, 1978 (age 48) Chicago, Illinois, U.S.
- Party: Democratic
- Education: Chicago State University (attended); Robert Morris University, Illinois (attended)

Emil Jones III (born May 16, 1978) is the Illinois State Senator for the 14th Senate District since 2010. The 14th district covers all or parts of Palos Heights, Oak Forest, Crestwood, Blue Island, Alsip, Midlothian, and Riverdale. Jones is the son of former Illinois Senate President Emil Jones.

== Electoral career ==
In the midst 2008 election season, Jones' father, Illinois Senate president Emil Jones, Jr., vacated the 14th Legislative District Illinois Senate seat in August, after the February 5 primary had already passed; son Jones III was appointed as Democratic candidate and won the November 2008 general election.

Jones was re-elected to the Illinois Senate in 2012, 2016 (to a 2-year term), and 2018, running unopposed in each election.

== Illinois State Senate ==
As of July 2022, Jones is a member of the following Illinois Senate committees:

- Appropriations - Business Regulations and Labor Committee (SAPP-SBRL)
- Energy and Public Utilities Committee (SENE)
- Financial Institutions Committee (SFIC)
- (Chairman of) Licensed Activities Committee (SLIC)
- Public Safety Committee (SPUB)
- Redistricting Committee (SRED)
- Redistricting - Chicago South Committee (SRED-SRCS)
- Transportation Committee (STRN)

Jones also serves as the Treasurer for the Illinois Legislative Black Caucus.

In September 2022, Jones was indicted on three felony charges, including bribery and lying to federal agents in connection with a scandal involving a company that provides red light cameras for the state of Illinois. Jones pled not guilty to the charges. Illinois Governor J. B. Pritzker called for Jones to resign his seat. The jury deadlocked on all three charges and U.S. District Judge Andrea Wood declared a mistrial.

== Personal life ==
Jones is the son of former Illinois Senate President Emil Jones Jr. and Patricia Jones. He graduated from Chicago Christian High School before attending Chicago State University and Robert Morris College but did not receive a degree from either institution. He is Roman Catholic.

Before becoming a State Senator, Jones served as an administrator at the Illinois Department of Commerce and Economic Opportunity.
