= Debra Silverstein =

American politician

Member of the Chicago City Council from the 50th ward
- Incumbent
- Assumed office May 16, 2011
- Preceded by: Bernard Stone

Personal details
- Born: October 4, 1965 (age 61) Memphis, Tennessee, U.S.
- Party: Democratic
- Spouse: Ira Silverstein
- Children: 4
- Education: University of Illinois, Chicago (BA)

Debra Silverstein is the Alderman of the 50th Ward of the City of Chicago, Illinois. She defeated 38-year incumbent Bernard Stone in the 2011 runoff election, a race in which she was endorsed by Mayor-elect Rahm Emanuel. She is currently the Chairman of the Chicago City Council’s Committee on License and Consumer Protection, which has jurisdiction over licensing and matters involving the Department of Business Affairs and Consumer Protection.

== Biography ==
Silverstein was formerly married to former Illinois State Senator Ira Silverstein, with whom she has four children. She holds a degree in accounting from the University of Illinois at Chicago. Before entering politics, she founded a small tax consultancy.

In addition to her political work, Silverstein is a co-founder of the Libenu Foundation, an organization creating supervised housing for adults with developmental disabilities in the Metropolitan Chicago area.

== Aldermanic career ==
In conjunction with the Chicago Department of Transportation, Silverstein oversaw the Devon Avenue Streetscape Project, a $15 million project on Devon Avenue in the 50th Ward. The project was designed to modernize and beautify a "20-block stretch in the West Ridge Business District which is known for ethnically diverse mixture of shops and restaurants." The project covered Devon from Kedzie Avenue to Leavitt Street and included:

- New trees with tree grates
- Landscaped in-ground and above-ground planters
- Light pole, intersection, and gateway community identifiers
- New wider sidewalks with ADA ramps
- New street and pedestrian lighting
- Paver parkways
- Benches, bike racks and waste containers
- Seating areas on side streets
- New crosswalks at each intersection

In 2016, Silverstein and Mayor Rahm Emanuel announced plans for a new library and senior housing facility in the 50th Ward. A partnership between Chicago Public Library and Chicago Housing Authority, Northtown Apartments and the new Northtown Branch Library are located at 6800 N. Western Avenue. The project was designed by Perkins + Will and features 44 apartments designated for senior use on top of a 16,000 square foot library. The library opened on March 5, 2019.

== Legislation ==
Silverstein has passed many major pieces of legislation during her administration, including:

- Traffic Crash Review and Analysis Ordinance - Requires the Chicago Department of Transportation to study fatal traffic crashes in the City of Chicago and make recommendations on how to improve traffic safety.
- CHI vs Hate – The first comprehensive amendment to Chicago’s hate crimes ordinance in more than 30 years. The legislation introduced a new reporting category called “hate incidents,” which are defined as non-criminal acts that target “an individual or group based on their actual or perceived race, color, sex, gender identity, age, religion, disability, national origin, ancestry, or sexual orientation.”
- Lithium-Ion Battery Safety Ordinance - This legislation seeks to prevent deadly fires in Chicago by requiring safety certification for electric scooters, e-bikes, and powered mobility device batteries. The ordinance includes penalties for retailers who sell products using batteries that do not meet UL or EN safety standards, as well as anyone who assembles or reconditions battery cells removed from used lithium-ion batteries.
- Bed Bug Ordinance - Adds strong rules and regulations regarding the reporting and treatment of bed bugs. Bed bugs are now considered a public health nuisance in Chicago, requiring property managers to hire qualified exterminators to deal with infestations in a manner that shows demonstrated success.

== Honors ==
In 2024 Silverstein was honored as one of the torchbearers in the national Israeli Independence Day ceremony.

== See also ==
- List of Chicago alderpersons since 1923
