= Erica Harriss =

American politician

Member of the Illinois Senate from the 56th district
- Incumbent
- Assumed office January 11, 2023
- Preceded by: Kris Tharp
- Succeeded by: Marsia Geldert-Murphey (elect)

Personal details
- Party: Republican
- Spouse: Jeff
- Children: 3
- Education: Southern Illinois University (B.A)
- Profession: Businessperson
- Website: Official website

Erica Harriss is an American Republican politician, currently a member of the Illinois Senate for the 56th District, which includes parts of Madison and St. Clair counties.

== Career ==
Harriss was first elected to the Illinois Senate in 2022, defeating incumbent Democrat Kris Tharp in the general election. She is running for reelection in 2026.

Harriss currently serves on the following committees: Approp- Health and Human; Energy and Public Utilities; Higher Education; Local Government (Minority Spokesperson); Veterans Affairs; Special Committee on Pensions.

== Electoral history ==
2022 Illinois State Senate District 56 General Election
Party	Candidate	Votes	%
Republican	Erica Harriss	37,192	51.4
Democratic	Kris Tharp	35,228	48.6
Total votes		72,420	100.0
