= Rachelle Crowe =

American attorney and politician

Rachelle Aud Crowe
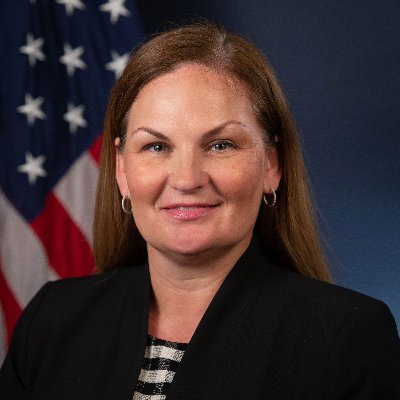

United States Attorney for the Southern District of Illinois
- In office June 21, 2022 – February 18, 2025
- President: Joe Biden; Donald Trump
- Preceded by: Steven D. Weinhoeft
- Succeeded by: Ali M. Summers (acting)

Member of the Illinois Senate from the 56th district
- In office January 9, 2019 – June 15, 2022
- Preceded by: Bill Haine
- Succeeded by: Kristopher Tharp

Personal details
- Born: 1972 or 1973 (age 52–53) Wood River, Illinois, U.S.
- Party: Democratic
- Education: University of Missouri (BA); Saint Louis University (JD)
- Profession: Attorney

Rachelle Aud Crowe (born 1972/1973) is the United States attorney for the Southern District of Illinois. She was previously a member of the Illinois Senate, representing the 56th district.

== Education ==
Crowe received a Bachelor of Arts from the University of Missouri–St. Louis in 1996 and a Juris Doctor from the Saint Louis University School of Law in 2000.

== Career ==
Crowe served as an associate with Hoagland, Fitzgerald, Smith & Praintis from 2000 to 2002, then Riezman Berger from 2002 to 2004 and Carmody MacDonald P.C. from 2004 to 2006. Crowe was previously a prosecutor with the Madison County State's Attorney's Office.

She defeated Downstate United and de facto Republican candidate Hal Patton, the mayor of Edwardsville, in the 2018 general election to succeed longtime Democratic incumbent Bill Haine. Crowe resigned from the Illinois Senate on June 15, 2022. In July 2022, Kristopher Tharp was appointed to succeed her.

=== U.S. attorney ===
On April 22, 2022, President Joe Biden announced his intent to nominate Crowe to serve as the United States attorney for the Southern District of Illinois. On April 25, 2022, her nomination was sent to the Senate. On May 12, 2022, her nomination was reported out of committee by voice vote. On May 17, 2022, her nomination was confirmed in the Senate by voice vote. She was sworn in on June 21, 2022.

Crowe resigned February 18, 2025.

== Electoral history ==
Illinois 56th State Senate District General Election, 2018
Party	Candidate	Votes	%
Democratic	Rachelle Aud Crowe	45,727	58.4
Downstate United	Hal Patton	32,549	41.6
Total votes		78,276	100.0
