= Illinois Department of Insurance =

Insurance agency in Illinois

Department of Insurance
Department overview
- Jurisdiction: Illinois
- Department executive: Ann Gillespie, Acting Director
- Website: idoi.illinois.gov

The Illinois Department of Insurance is the code department of the Illinois state government that regulates various facets of the insurance industries and professions of Illinois. Key insurance industries it regulates include health insurance, auto insurance, homeowners insurance, and life insurance. The department is the umbrella agency that operates the Illinois Health Benefits Exchange (IHBE), a health insurance marketplace that serves as an intermediary between Illinois residents and the health-insurance mandate requirements of the Affordable Care Act. The IHBE operates under the flag of Get Covered Illinois, the name of its navigational website.
