= Kristopher Tharp =

American politician, law enforcement officer

Kris Tharp

Member of the Illinois Senate from the 56th district
- In office July 8, 2022 – January 11, 2023
- Preceded by: Rachelle Crowe
- Succeeded by: Erica Harriss

Personal details
- Born: Wood River, Illinois
- Party: Democratic
- Spouse: Jaime Tharp
- Children: 2
- Education: Lindenwood University (B.S., M.S.)
- Profession: Police officer

Kristopher "Kris" Tharp is an American law enforcement officer and politician serving as a member of the Illinois Senate from the 56th district. He assumed office on July 8, 2022, succeeding Rachelle Crowe.

== Early life and education ==
Tharp was born and raised in Wood River, Illinois. He earned a Bachelor of Science and Master of Science in criminal justice administration from Lindenwood University.

== Career ==
Tharp began his career as a police officer in Berkeley and Overland, Missouri. He then joined the Madison County Sheriff's Office, serving as a deputy sheriff from 1999 to 2004, detective from 2004 to 2009, and sergeant from 2009 to 2011. From 2013 to 2015, he was an investigator for the Southern Illinois Child Death Investigation Task Force. From 2012 to 2020, he served as a lieutenant in the Madison County Sheriff's Office. In 2019, he was appointed to serve as a member of the Illinois Elder Abuse Task Force. Tharp also served as a supervisor of the Major Case Squad of Greater St. Louis and jail administrator in the Madison County Sheriff's Office. On July 8, 2022, Tharp was appointed to succeed Rachelle Crowe in the Illinois Senate after Crowe was confirmed as a United States attorney.

== Personal life ==
Tharp lives in Bethalto, Illinois, with his wife. He has two adult sons, Kameron and Tyler.
