= Emil Jones =

American politician

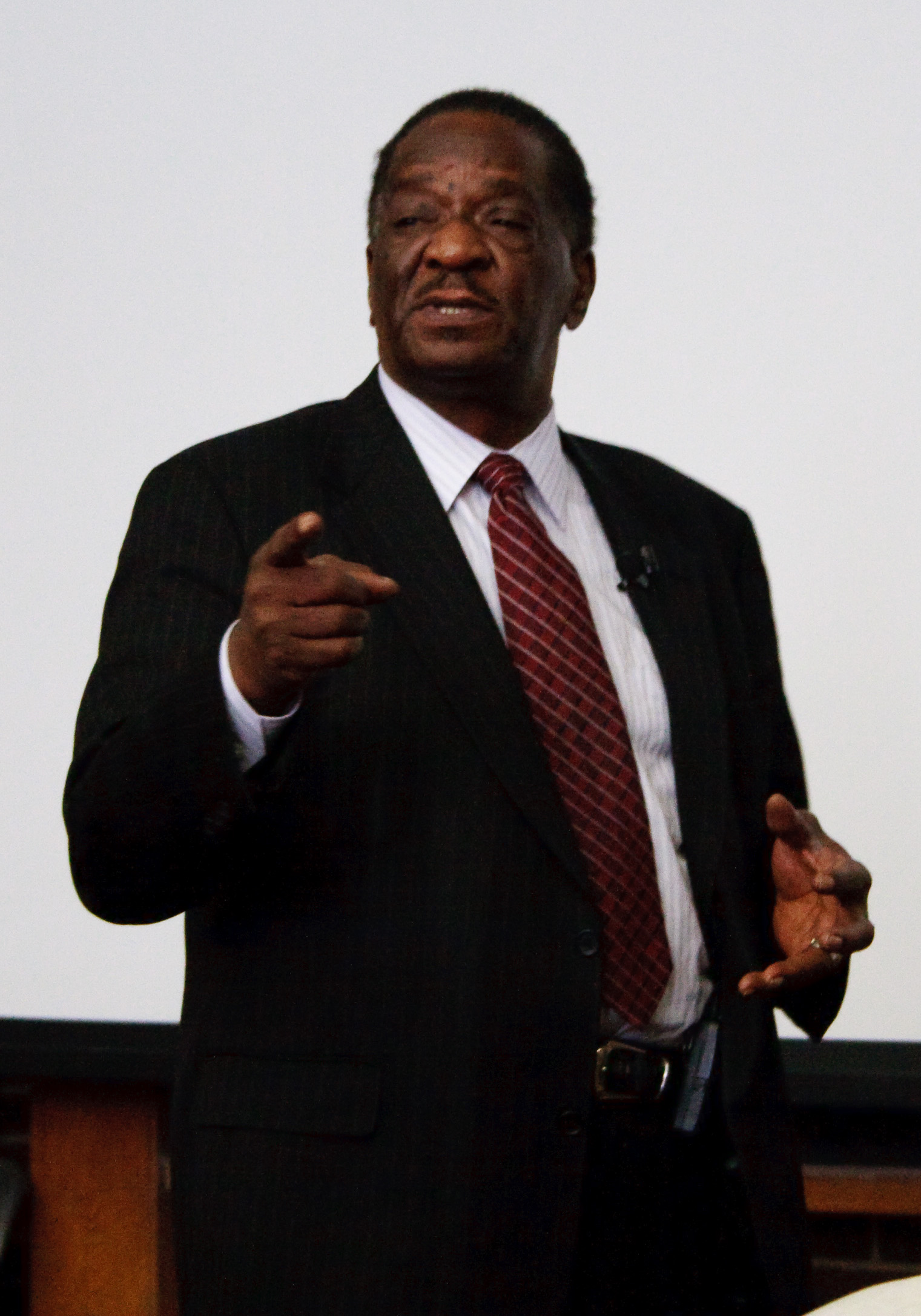
- February 2009

President of the Illinois Senate
- In office January 8, 2003 – January 3, 2009
- Preceded by: James Philip
- Succeeded by: John Cullerton

Member of the Illinois Senate
- In office January 3, 1983 – January 3, 2009
- Preceded by: Constituency established
- Succeeded by: Emil Jones III
- Constituency: 17th district (1983–1993); 14th district (1993–2009)

Member of the Illinois House of Representatives from the 28th district
- In office January 8, 1973 – January 3, 1983
- Succeeded by: Constituency abolished

Personal details
- Born: October 18, 1935 (age 90) Chicago, Illinois, U.S.
- Party: Democratic
- Spouse: Lorrie Jones
- Education: Harold Washington College; Roosevelt University (BA)

Emil Jones Jr. (born October 18, 1935) is an American politician who was the president of the Illinois Senate from 2003 to 2009. A Democrat, Jones served in the Illinois Senate from 1983 to 2009, where he served as President of the Illinois Senate from 2003 to the end of his term. Previously, he was a member of the Illinois House of Representatives from 1973 until 1983.

== Education ==
Jones studied at Chicago's Tilden Technical High School, where he graduated in 1953. He went on to earn an Associate in Arts degree from the Loop Junior College, now Harold Washington College. Thereafter he attended Roosevelt University, where he majored in Business Administration.

In 2004, Roosevelt University awarded Jones a Doctorate of Humane Letters Honoris Causa Degree. Chicago State University awarded Jones an honorary Doctor of Humane Letters degree.

== Early political career ==
The son of a bailiff who was Chicago Democratic precinct captain, Jones began his political career working for John F. Kennedy in the 1960 presidential election.

In 1967, he went to work as an alderman's assistant. His career included 30 years on the city payroll, 20 with the Sewer Department, where he retired as an inspector in 1993.

== Legislative career ==
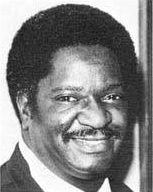
Jones, circa 1983

In 1973, Jones was elected to the Illinois House of Representatives. He served in that capacity from 1973 to 1983. During that time he served as the chairman of the Insurance Committee and was an assistant Democratic leader. In 1982, he was elected to the Illinois Senate. In December 1992, Jones was selected as the Democratic leader of the Illinois Senate. At the time, the Democratic party was not the majority party in the Illinois Senate. In addition to being the president of the Senate, he also served as a member of the executive committee. He lost Democratic primary bids for a congressional seat in 1988 and 1995.

Jones had a big hand in Barack Obama’s 2004 U.S. Senate win by introducing the then little-known liberal state senator to the right people and letting him handle some important legislation to help raise his political profile.

In 2008, Jones at first refused to call the Senate into session to vote on ethics legislation that had passed the House, saying that the 15-day limit for the Senate to look at the legislation didn't come into effect until the Senate came back into session. After Obama urged Jones to change his mind, Jones released a statement saying he would call the Senate into session, saying in a statement: "I plan to call the Senate back into session to deal with the issue of ethics, only at the request of my friend Barack Obama. I still stand by our interpretation of the 15-day rule."

Jones is a member of the Forum of Senate Presidents' Board of Directors and the State Legislative Leaders Foundation's Board of Directors. As President of the Senate, he was able to block legislation, even if most senators wanted to a vote on it.

== Controversies ==
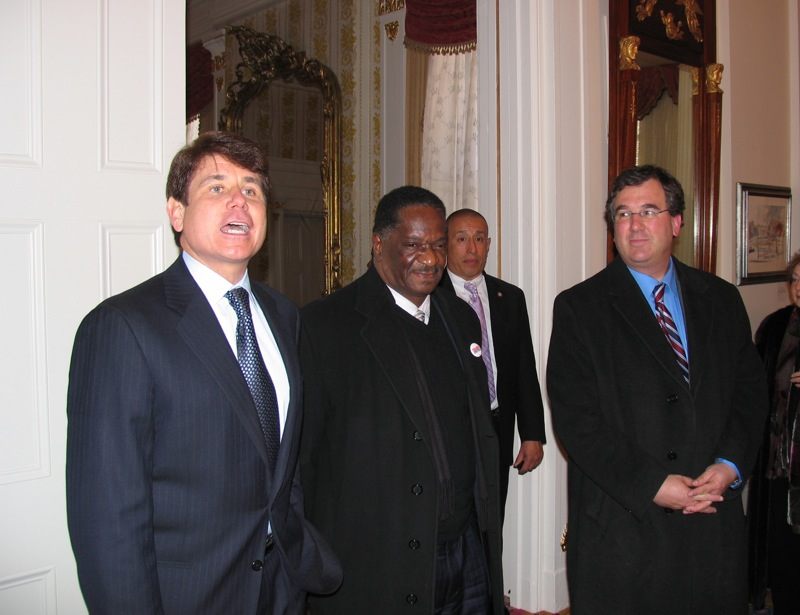
Rod Blagojevich (left), Jones (center front), and Jeffrey Schoenberg (right) at the Illinois Executive Mansion for a luncheon after Barack Obama launched his 2008 campaign.

Jones had feuds during his time in office with other Democrats, most notably House Speaker Michael Madigan. He has been an ally of impeached ex-Governor Rod Blagojevich. Jones teamed with fellow Chicago Democrat Blagojevich to propose plans for health care and education, paid for by $5 billion in increased business taxes and gambling. The plan did not have enough support to pass the Senate and according to Madigan would fail in the House. When Jones attended strategy session meetings regarding the 2007 budget, he barred one of the members of his own leadership because he feared the member would leak information to Madigan.

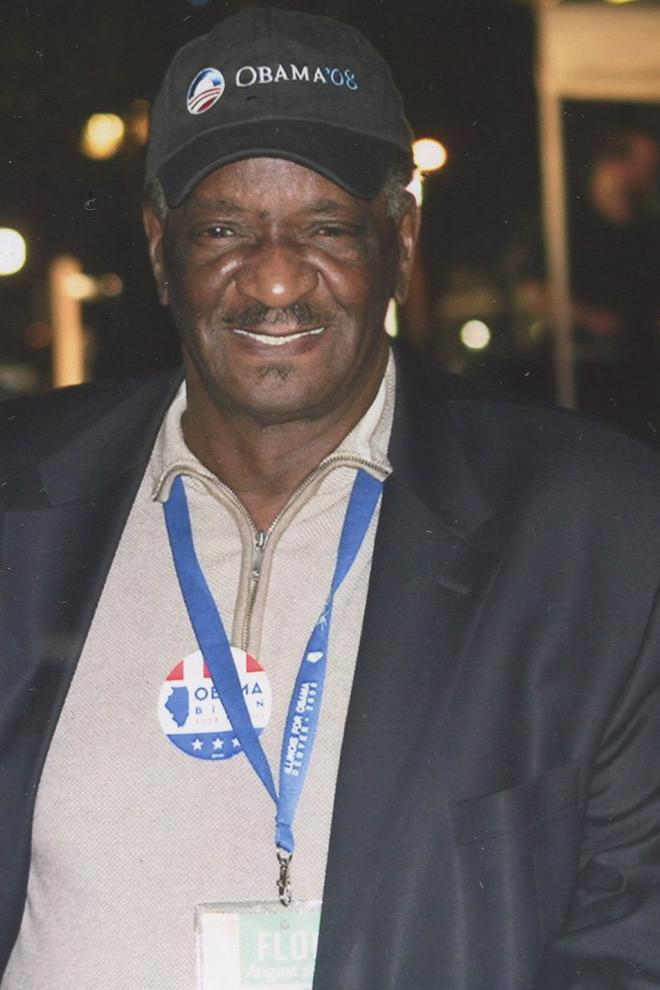
Jones at 2008 Democratic National Convention

During his years in the Illinois General Assembly, Jones often kept up the traditions of old-school politicians. He has steered state money to a few favored institutions, including some that employ his relatives. Some of his relatives also have gotten state jobs and his wife’s government salary got a sizable boost after he became Senate president in 2003, when the Blagojevich administration created a special salary class.

Jones faced scrutiny after it was reported that his wife received a $70,000 pay raise two months after she and Jones were married and four months after she started her position, when Governor Rod Blagojevich created a special salary class for her position. Jones also received attention in 2008 for postponing a vote on an automatic legislative pay raise of 7.5% which would go into effect if the Senate did not vote on the proposal. The House voted no.

Jones announced in August 2008 that he would retire in January 2009. When asked who would replace him on the ballot, his spokesperson said, "His preference, yes, would be to see his son Emil Jones, III serve," which has prompted criticism and been described as "anointing one of his children to take over for him."

== Political positions ==
During his time in the General Assembly, Jones had advocated for such issues as funding public education in Illinois. Jones was also instrumental in then-State Senator Barack Obama's United States Senate campaign.

== Personal life ==
A long resident of Chicago, he is married to Dr. Lorrie Jones, a psychologist. He and his late wife Patricia had four children. He is a Catholic. His son, Emil Jones III, is an Illinois state senator.

Illinois House of Representatives
Preceded by John Downes; Eugene Barnes; Theodore Meyer	Member of the Illinois House of Representatives from the 28th district 1973–1983; Served alongside: Daniel Houlihan, Robert Dunne, Theodore Meyer, James F. Keane	Succeeded by James F. Keane
Illinois Senate
Preceded by Steven G. Nash	Member of the Illinois Senate from the 17th district 1983–1993	Succeeded by Bruce A. Farley
Preceded by Tom Dart	Member of the Illinois Senate from the 14th district 1993–2009	Succeeded by Emil Jones III
Preceded by James Philip	Minority Leader of the Illinois Senate; 1993–2003	Succeeded by Frank Watson
Political offices
Preceded by James Philip	President of the Illinois Senate; 2003–2009	Succeeded by John Cullerton
