= Thomas McCracken Jr. =

American lawyer

Thomas J. McCracken Jr. (born October 27, 1952) was an American lawyer and politician.

McCracken was born in Chicago, Illinois. He received his bachelor's degree from Marquette University and his Juris Doctor degree from Loyola University Chicago School of Law. McCracken lived in Downers Grove, Illinois with his wife and family and practiced law in Chicago. He served in the Illinois House of Representatives in 1982 and was then a Republican. McCracken then served in the Illinois Senate in 1993 and then resigned from the Illinois General Assembly.

Illinois House of Representatives
Preceded by District created	Member of the Illinois House of Representatives from the 81st district 1983–1993	Succeeded by Judy Biggert
Illinois Senate
Preceded by George R. Hudson	Member of the Illinois Senate from the 41st district 1993	Succeeded by Kirk Dillard
