= James F. Keane =

American politician and educator (1934–2020)

James Francis Keane (August 8, 1934 – April 12, 2020) was an American politician and educator.

Keane was born in Chicago, Illinois and graduated from Archbishop Quigley Preparatory Seminary. Keane served in the United States Army. He graduated from Loyola University Chicago, Roosevelt University, and Nova Southeastern University. He taught at Leo Catholic High School from 1961 to 1968, at Chicago State University from 1972 to 1975, and had a fellowship at the University of Illinois in Champaign-Urbana in the early 1990s. He also worked for the City of Chicago as director of resource mobilization from 1970 to 1972. Keane served in the Illinois House of Representatives from 1979 to 1992 and was a Democrat. He died in Chicago, Illinois.
