= Tom Rooney (Illinois politician) =

American politician (born 1968)

Member of the Illinois Senate from the 27th district
- In office September 28, 2016 – January 9, 2019
- Preceded by: Matt Murphy
- Succeeded by: Ann Gillespie

Mayor of Rolling Meadows
- In office May 2011 – September 2016
- Preceded by: Ken Nelson
- Succeeded by: Len Prejna

Personal details
- Born: March 24, 1968 (age 58) Evanston, Illinois
- Party: Republican
- Spouse(s): Sue Daniels; Colleen Heffernan (d. 2005)
- Children: 4
- Education: Loyola University (B.A.); Northern Illinois University (M.P.A.)
- Profession: Teacher

Tom Rooney (born March 24, 1968) is a former Republican member of the Illinois Senate, representing the 27th district from 2016 to 2019. Previously, he served as Mayor of Rolling Meadows and as a member of the Rolling Meadows city council.

== Personal life ==
Rooney received a B.A. in History from Loyola University Chicago and an M.P.A. from Northern Illinois University. He is a graduate of Evanston Township High School and was elected Youth Governor in the Illinois State Youth and Government program.

He and his wife, Sue, have four sons: Chris, Brian, Adam, and Christopher.

He has taught social studies at West Leyden High School for over 20 years, and continued to teach while serving in the legislature.

== Political career ==
In 2000, he was appointed to a vacancy on the Rolling Meadows city council, and he was re-elected in 2001 and 2005. He decided not to run for re-election in 2009 due to his commitment to term limits. In 2011, he was elected Mayor of Rolling Meadows and ran unopposed for a second term in 2015. In the 2016 Republican Party presidential primaries, Rooney was a delegate pledged to the presidential campaign of Marco Rubio.

In September 2016, he was appointed to the Illinois Senate to replace outgoing Senator Matt Murphy. In the 2018 general election, he lost 52%-48% to Democratic candidate Ann Gillespie.
