= Evelyn M. Bowles =

American politician and teacher (1921–2016)

Evelyn M. Bowles (April 22, 1921 – April 8, 2016) was an American politician and teacher.

== Biography ==
Born in Worden, Illinois, Bowles served in the United States Coast Guard Women's Reserve (SPAR) Intelligence Division during World War II. She went to Greenville College, Illinois State University, Southern Illinois University and was an elementary school teacher. Bowles lived in Edwardsville, Illinois. From 1975 to 1994, Bowles served as the county clerk for Madison County, Illinois and was a Democrat. She was appointed to the Illinois Senate in 1994 after the incumbent Sam M. Vadalabene died while still in office and served until 2003. Bowles died in Edwardsville, Illinois.

== Preservation of Cahokia Mounds ==
In 2000, Bowles was the recipient of the Illinois Archaeology Public Service Award for her work in securing protection for more land on the site of the Cahokia Mounds, specifically the Sugarloaf property.

State Senator Evelyn M. Bowles wrote about the Cahokia Mounds site:

Through the years my friends and I made occasional Sunday afternoon trips to the Mounds. When I became the State Senator, it afforded me the opportunity to secure funds for the acquisition of additional acreage in which there are smaller Mounds. Many of these have contained additional artifacts.

In 2005, Bowles presented a grant of $250,000 to the Cahokia Mounds Museum Society's Land Acquisition Committee to secure land surrounding the State Park Place area. These funds were used to purchase 44 new lots, including 3 mounds.
