= Kirk Dillard =

American politician

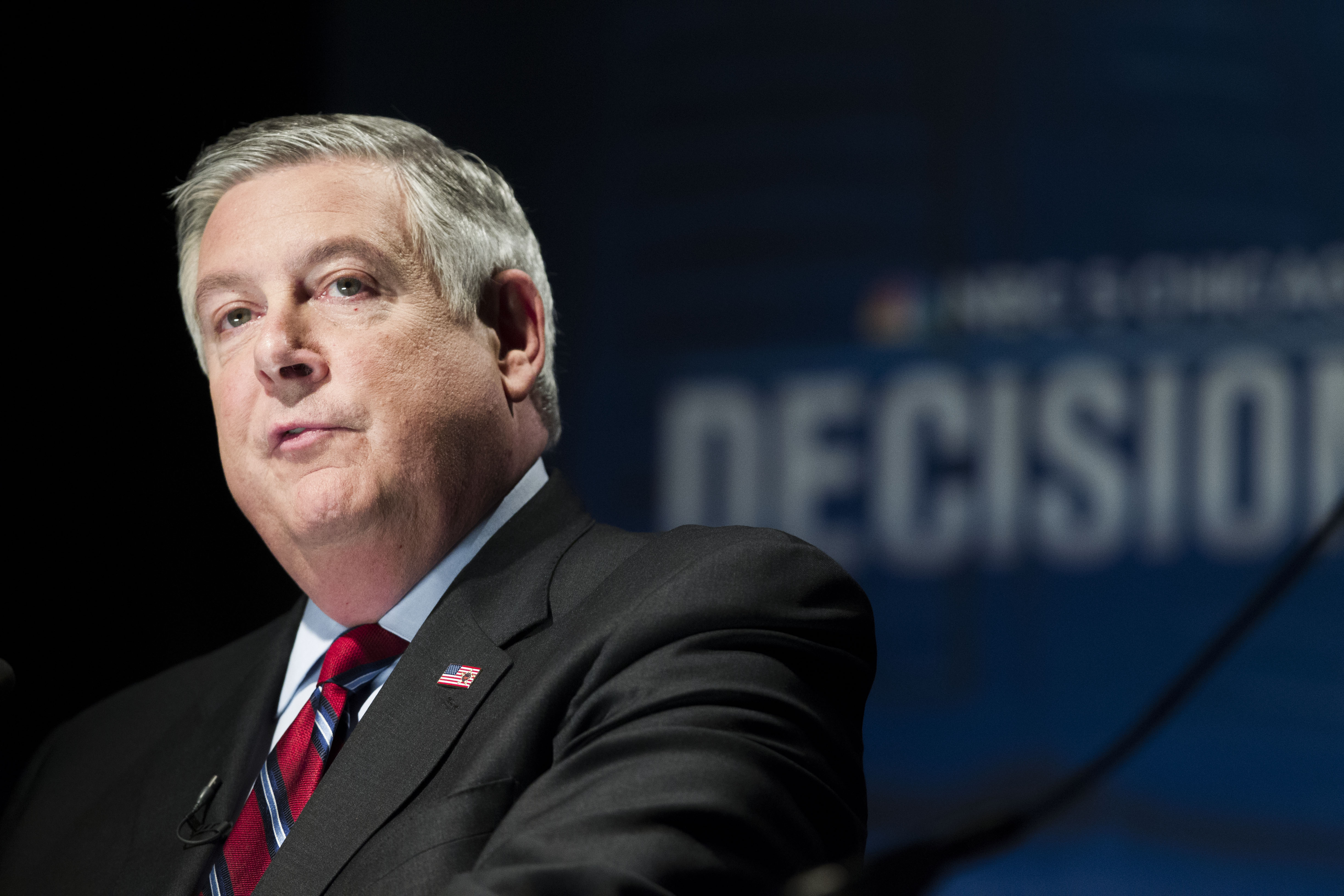
- Dillard in 2014

Chair of the Regional Transportation Authority Board of Directors
- Incumbent
- Assumed office 2014
- Preceded by: John Gates

Member of the Illinois Senate from the 24th district
- In office December 10, 1993 – August 4, 2014
- Preceded by: Thomas McCracken Jr.
- Succeeded by: Chris Nybo

Personal details
- Born: June 1, 1955 (age 71) Chicago, Illinois, U.S.
- Party: Republican
- Spouse: Stephanie Dillard
- Children: 2
- Education: Western Illinois University (BA); DePaul University (JD)

Kirk W. Dillard (born June 1, 1955) is an American politician and the current Chairman of the Regional Transportation Authority Board of Directors. Previously, he served as a Republican member of the Illinois State Senate, representing the 24th District from 1993 until his resignation in August 2014.

== Early life and education ==
Dillard was born in Chicago on June 1, 1955. He graduated from Hinsdale Central High School, where he is now a Hall of Fame Alumnus, received his B.A. from Western Illinois University, and later obtained his J.D. from DePaul University College of Law. Dillard serves as a Public Policy School mentor for the University of Chicago.

== Early career ==
Dillard was the chief of staff to former governor Jim Edgar, starting in 1991, for Edgar's first term. He also served as the Director of Legislative Affairs to former Governor James R. Thompson. On April 1, 1987, Governor Jim Thompson appointed Dillard to be a judge on the Illinois Court of Claims for a term ending January 16, 1989. On June 23, 1987, the Illinois Senate confirmed Dillard to said judgeship. The seat filled by Dillard was a newly created seat as part of the expansion of the court from five members to seven members. On April 13, 1989, Dillard was reappointed for a term ending January 16, 1995 and confirmed for said term by the Illinois Senate on June 26, 1989.

Dillard was a member of the Republican Illinois State Central Committee and was a chairman of the DuPage County Republican Party. He sits on the Board of Directors for the Robert Crown Center for Health Education and is a partner at Locke Lord Bissell & Liddell LLP.

== Illinois State Senate ==
Dillard served in the Illinois Senate from 1993 to 2014. Dillard was appointed to the State Senate in December 1993, after Thomas McCracken Jr. resigned. At the start of the 95th General Assembly, Senate Minority Leader Frank Watson appointed Dillard to the Senate Republican leadership team as a Minority Caucus Whip. Dillard is a member of the American Legislative Exchange Council (ALEC), serving as Illinois state leader.

In June 2007, he appeared in an Iowa TV ad touting his former state senate colleague, Barack Obama.

Dillard served in the Illinois Senate as the Co-Chairperson of the Judiciary Committee, and Chairman of the High Technology Task Force. He also served on the Senate Committee as a Whole; Environment & Energy Committee; Executive Appointments Committee; Licensed Activities Committee; and the Subcommittee on Amendments; Subcommittee on Special Issues (Where he was the Sub-Minority Spokesperson); and the Environment & Energy Subcommittee.

Dillard cosponsored the Senior Citizens Tax Deferral program. Dillard was a sponsor of Illinois' first major campaign finance and ethics reform in 25 years.

Dillard resigned from the Illinois Senate effective August 3, 2014. The Republican Party for the 24th Legislative District appointed Chris Nybo, the Republican nominee for the 2014 general election, to the vacancy.

== Illinois Governor campaigns ==
=== 2010 ===
On July 8, 2009, Dillard officially announced his candidacy for governor in Hinsdale, Illinois. He opened a campaign office on Ogden Avenue in Lisle, Illinois.

Dillard attempted to frame his campaign as focused on enacting Illinois ethics reform and making the state more financially responsible to the taxpayers. The field for the February 2, 2010 primary was crowded, with seven Republicans running. Dillard was dogged through the entire campaign for a commercial in which he appeared to endorse Democrat Barack Obama for president, leading conservative activists to compare him to Dede Scozzafava.

In his campaign for governor, Dillard was endorsed by the Illinois State Rifle Association, NRA Political Victory Fund, Illinois Education Association, Union of Operating Engineers, Local 150, Sangamon County Republican Party, Family-PAC, Aurora Beacon News, Chicago Sun-Times, Crain's Chicago Business, Peoria Journal Star, Elgin Courier, Kankakee City News, Naperville Sun, News-Herald, Southtown Star, Southwest News-Herald, Springfield State Journal-Register, St. Louis Post-Dispatch. He was also endorsed by former Illinois Governor Jim Edgar.

Dillard placed second, losing to Bill Brady by 193 votes. Dillard did not concede the race until a month after the election.

=== 2014 ===
Jil Tracy, whose family owns DOT Foods, was Dillard's running mate.

Dillard was endorsed by the Illinois Education Association, the Illinois Federation of Teachers, Illinois State Rifle Association, AFSCME, former Governors Jim Edgar and Jim Thompson, and the Fraternal Order of Police Labor Council

Leading up to the March Primary, a Capitol Fax/We Ask America poll indicated that Bruce Rauner was leading in Dillard's home Senate District likely due to a strong television advertising push by Rauner. However, a more recent We Ask America Poll was conducted just a week before the Primary Election and showed a late surge for Dillard.

Rauner defeated Dillard with 40% of the vote to Dillard's 37%.

== Post-legislative career ==
In late June 2014 Dillard was selected to become the RTA's new chairperson. He indicated that his priorities as RTA chair would include eliminating interagency turf wars and improving Metra service reliability. In 2024, Governor JB Pritzker nominated Dillard to the Board of Trustees of Western Illinois University on April 12, 2023. The Illinois Senate confirmed Dillard on May 19, 2023.

== Reputation ==
In 2004, an unsigned opinion piece in The New York Times called on Dillard to run against his old friend Barack Obama for U.S. Senator, stating "Illinois needs you—and so does Mr. Obama."

Dillard has been called an "accomplished and articulate legislator," by Politico.

== Awards and honors ==
The following awards and honors have been given to Dillard during his time in the Illinois Senate:

- Crain's Chicago Business "Who's Who in Chicago Business".
- University of Illinois Springfield's Illinois Issues Magazine, "Legislative Staff Hall of Fame.
- "Outstanding Legislator" presented by both the nation's private bi-partisan and Republican legislators associations.
- Illinois State Crime Commission "Legislator of the Year".
- Family PAC "Legislator of the Year" & "Friend of the Family" awards.
- Illinois Equal Justice Foundation – "Champion of Justice Award" for providing legal aid to low-income families.
- Illinois Press Association – "Legislative Service Award" for dedication to strengthening Open Meetings and Freedom of Information Acts.
- Illinois Chamber of Commerce – "Champion of Free Enterprise".
- Named Western Illinois University's "Man of the Year" in 1977.
- The Illinois Hospital and Health Systems Association named Dillard an "Outstanding Legislator for 1999."
- Illinois Civil Justice League "Friends of Fairness" Award
