= Ira Silverstein =

American politician

Member of the Illinois Senate from the 8th district
- In office January 1999 – January 2019
- Preceded by: Howard W. Carroll
- Succeeded by: Ram Villivalam

Personal details
- Born: October 10, 1960 (age 65) Chicago, Illinois
- Party: Democratic
- Spouse: Debra Silverstein
- Children: Four
- Education: Loyola University (B.A.); John Marshall Law School (J.D.)
- Profession: Attorney

Ira I. Silverstein (born October 10, 1960) is a former Democratic member of the Illinois Senate, representing the 8th district from 1999 to 2019. The 8th Senate District consists of Forest Glen, North Park and West Ridge in the City of Chicago and its surrounding suburbs of Park Ridge, Morton Grove, Niles, Lincolnwood and Skokie, as of the decennial redistricting following the 2010 United States census.

== Early life ==
Silverstein's father was a public school teacher. Silverstein attended Boone Elementary School and Mather High School and then earned his bachelor's degree from Loyola University Chicago. He later received his J.D. degree from the John Marshall Law School.

== Senate career ==
Silverstein was the Chairman of the Senate Executive Committee, and he served on the Senate Judiciary and Licensed Activities committees, and the Joint Committee on Administrative Rules (JCAR). JCAR reviews regulations imposed by state departments on business and citizens to ensure they are in accordance with the department's legal authority.

In 2013, Silverstein introduced the "Internet Posting Removal Act" which sought to require web site admins to "upon request, remove any posted comments posted by an anonymous poster unless the anonymous poster agrees to attach his or her name to the post and confirms that his or her IP address, legal name, and home address are accurate. The bill was the subject of much derision, and was later withdrawn.

He also introduced a modification to the Illinois Vehicle Code to make operating a motor vehicle with a wearable computing headset illegal.

In 2017, he was accused of sexual harassment by victims rights advocate Denise Rotheimer, who released a series of flirtatious messages the two had exchanged. He resigned his position as Senate Democratic whip after she named him publicly during legislative hearings. Rotheimer claimed Silverstein made unwanted comments about her appearance and late-night phone calls she felt pressured to accept in order to advance legislation. The inspector general of the Illinois General Assembly released a report in January 2018 saying he did not engage in sexual harassment but he "did behave in a manner unbecoming of a legislator in violation of the Illinois Governmental Ethics Act."

In the March 20, 2018 Democratic primary, Silverstein was defeated by more than 20 points by Ram Villivalam in the first competitive primary he faced since taking the seat. Silverstein resigned a few days before the start of the 101st General Assembly allowing his successor to be sworn in the weekend before inauguration. Also in 2018, Debra Silverstein, his wife, replaced Ira Silverstein as the Democratic Party's committeeperson (until 2018 legal name change, "committeeman") for Chicago's 50th Ward.

In early 2020, Ira Silverstein ran for election for the 9th Subcircuit judge of the Cook County Judicial Circuit Court in Illinois. Silverstein lost in the Democratic primary on March 17, 2020.

== Personal life ==
Silverstein is a practicing attorney. He maintains offices in downtown Chicago and a neighborhood office on Devon Avenue, serving small business owners and residents in matters such as elder law, estate planning and business issues.

Silverstein is married to Chicago Alderman Debra Silverstein, and they have four children.

Silverstein is an Orthodox Jew. As a state senator, he shared an office suite with fellow senator and future U.S. president Barack Obama, who would often assist Silverstein with various tasks on the Sabbath.
