= Chris Nybo =

American politician and attorney

Member of the Illinois Senate from the 24th district
- In office August 2014 – November 2018
- Preceded by: Kirk Dillard
- Succeeded by: Yadav Nathwani

Member of the Illinois House of Representatives from the 41st district
- In office January 2011 – January 2013
- Preceded by: Bob Biggins
- Succeeded by: Darlene Senger (redistricted)

Personal details
- Born: April 30, 1977 (age 49) Elmhurst, Illinois
- Party: Republican
- Spouse: Faye
- Children: Three
- Education: Dartmouth College (B.A.); University of Chicago (J.D.)
- Profession: Attorney

Chris Nybo (born April 30, 1977) is an American attorney and politician who is a former Republican member of the Illinois Senate. He represented the 24th District. Previously, he had been a member of the Illinois House of Representatives, representing the 41st District from 2011 to 2013.

== Career ==
Nybo received a B.A. from Dartmouth College and a J.D. from the University of Chicago Law School. Nybo was a recipient of a Harry S. Truman Scholarship. He previously served as an Elmhurst, Illinois alderman. Nybo was selected as an Illinois Rising Star in 2010, 2011, and 2012. Nybo served on the following committees: Mass Transit; Consumer Protection; Environment & Energy; Transportation, Regulation, Roads; and Tollway Oversight.

In 2012, Nybo ran for election to the 24th District seat in the Illinois State Senate. He faced incumbent and fellow Republican Kirk Dillard in the primary on March 20, 2012, but lost.

In 2013, Nybo began a second run for the Illinois Senate being vacated by Kirk Dillard and defeated fellow Republican Dennis Reboletti in the primary. In August, he was appointed to this same seat when Dillard resigned to become Chairman of the RTA.

In 2018, he was narrowly defeated by Suzy Glowiak, conceding the race on November 10, 2018. Nybo then resigned from his seat on November 15, 2018 and was replaced by Yadav Nathwani.

== Personal life ==
Nybo and his wife Faye have three children, Connor, Olivia, and Allison.

== Electoral history ==
Illinois 41st State House District Republican Primary, 2010
Party	Candidate	Votes	%
Republican	Chris Nybo	5,906	45.94
Republican	Brien Sheahan	3,575	27.81
Republican	Rafael Rivadeneira	1,951	15.18
Republican	Michael Manzo	823	6.4
Republican	Matt Burden	601	4.67
Total votes		12,856	100.0

Illinois 41st State House District General Election, 2010
Party	Candidate	Votes	%
Republican	Chris Nybo	23,537	62.43
Democratic	Brian Stephenson	14,166	37.57
Total votes		37,703	100.0

Illinois 24th State Senate District Republican Primary, 2012
Party	Candidate	Votes	%
Republican	Kirk Dillard	19,287	61.69
Republican	Chris Nybo	11,979	38.31
Total votes		31,266	100.0

Illinois 24th State Senate District Republican Primary, 2014
Party	Candidate	Votes	%
Republican	Chris Nybo	15,544	58.88
Republican	Dennis Reboletti	10,852	41.11
Total votes		26,396	100.0

Illinois 24th State Senate District General Election, 2014
Party	Candidate	Votes	%
Republican	Chris Nybo	47,590	60.28
Democratic	Suzanne Glowiak	31,357	39.72
Total votes		78,947	100.0

Illinois 24th State Senate District Republican Primary, 2018
Party	Candidate	Votes	%
Republican	Chris Nybo (incumbent)	17,575	100.0
Total votes		17,575	100.0

Illinois 24th State Senate District General Election, 2018
Party	Candidate	Votes	%
Democratic	Suzanne Glowiak	51,695	50.8
Republican	Chris Nybo (incumbent)	50,059	49.2
Total votes		101,754	100.0
