= Illinois's 1st House of Representatives district =

American legislative district

Illinois's 1st State House of Representatives district
Representative
Aaron Ortiz; D–Chicago
since 2019
- Demographics: 9.4% White; 8.1% Black; 78.9% Hispanic; 2.5% Asian; 0.1% Native American; 0.0% Hawaiian/Pacific Islander; 0.3% Other; 0.7% Multiracial
- Population (2020): 109,593
- Created: 1983–present 1849–1873, 1957–1973

Illinois's 1st House of Representatives district is a Representative district within the Illinois House of Representatives located in Cook County, Illinois. It has been represented by Democrat Aaron Ortiz since January 9, 2019. The district was previously represented by Democrat Daniel J. Burke from 2013 to 2018.

The district covers parts of Chicago, Forest View, and Stickney, and of Chicago's neighborhoods, it covers Archer Heights, Bridgeport, Brighton Park, Chicago Lawn, Gage Park, Garfield Ridge, McKinley Park, New City, and West Elsdon.

== Representative district history ==
Prior to the ratification of the 1848 Illinois Constitution, counties (or two or more counties) were designated a certain number of Senators and Representatives. With the ratification of the 1848 Illinois Constitution, Legislative and Representative districts were numbered and called by name. Each district was still assigned a certain number of Senators and Representatives. After the passage of the 1872 Apportionment, only Legislative districts were drawn with Representatives elected cumulatively. The 1954 amendment to the 1870 Illinois Constitution established Representative districts as separate from Legislative districts (with representatives still elected cumulatively). The boundaries of Representative and Legislative districts would differ. After the United States Supreme Court ruled in Reynolds v. Sims (1964) that "both houses of state legislatures must be apportioned according to districts of equal population," new districts were redrawn for the Illinois Senate and Illinois House of Representatives. While the Legislative districts were redrawn, the Governor and General Assembly failed to agree on Representative district boundaries. Under the 1954 amendment, "a 10-man bipartisan commission appointed by the governor from recommendations made by both parties" were directed to redraw boundaries but failed to do so in 1963. Because of this failure, and with no district boundaries redrawn, all Representative districts were temporarily merged into one at-large district with 177 representatives (the total number of representatives at the time). The 1964 Illinois House election had several candidates running for all 177 seats throughout the state. In 1965, the Representative districts were redrawn by the Illinois Legislative Reapportionment Commission and elections held in 1966 were done with separate districts. With the 1971 Apportionment (and adoption of the 1970 Illinois Constitution), Representative districts were abolished and representatives were once again elected cumulatively per Legislative district. After the passage of the Cutback Amendment in 1980, the number of Representatives was reduced from 177 to 118 with Representative districts re-established and now electing a single representative.

== Prominent representatives ==
Representative	Notes
John Dougherty	Elected the 17th Lieutenant Governor of Illinois (1869 – 1873); Elected as a judge in the Illinois circuit courts (1877 – 1879)
Bradley M. Glass	Served as a lieutenant in the United States Navy
Jack E. Walker	Elected the 62nd Speaker of the Illinois House of Representatives (1969 – 1971)
Anthony Scariano	Served as a judge in the Illinois Appellate Court (1985 – 1996)
Brian Barnett Duff	Served as a judge in the United States District Court for the Northern District of Illinois (1985 – 1996); Served as senior judge in the United States District Court for the Northern District of Illinois (1996 – 2016)
Suzana Mendoza	Elected the 10th Illinois Comptroller (2016 – present)

== List of representatives ==
=== 1849 – 1873 ===
Representative	Party	Years (Note: From 1870 to 1970, the GA met for a new session on the Wednesday after the first Monday of January.)	General Assembly (GA)	Electoral history	Counties represented
District established with 1848 Illinois Constitution
John Cochran	Democratic	January 1, 1849 – January 6, 1851	16th	Elected in 1848; Was not re-elected in 1850	Alexander; Pulaski; Union
Cyrus G. Simons	Unknown	January 6, 1851 – January 3, 1853	17th	Elected in 1850; Was not re-elected in 1852	Alexander; Pulaski; Union
John Cochran	Democratic	January 3, 1853 – January 1, 1855	18th	Elected back in 1852; Was not re-elected in 1854	Alexander; Pulaski; Union
F. M. Rawlings	Democratic	January 1, 1855 – January 5, 1857	19th	Elected in 1854; Was not re-elected in 1856	Alexander; Pulaski; Union
John Dougherty	Republican	January 5, 1857 – January 3, 1859	20th	Elected in 1856; Was not re-elected in 1858	Alexander; Pulaski; Union
William A. Hacker	Democratic	January 3, 1859 – January 5, 1863	21st 22nd	Elected in 1858; Re-elected in 1860; Was not re-elected in 1862	Alexander; Pulaski; Union
James H. Smith	Unknown	January 5, 1863 – January 2, 1865	23rd	Elected in 1862; Was not re-elected in 1864	Alexander; Pulaski; Union
Henry W. Webb	Democratic	January 2, 1865 – January 7, 1867	24th	Elected in 1864; Was not re-elected in 1866	Alexander; Pulaski; Union
Newton R. Casey	Democratic	January 7, 1867 – January 4, 1871	25th 26th	Elected in 1866; Re-elected in 1868; Was not re-elected in 1870	Alexander; Pulaski; Union
H. Watson Webb	Democratic	January 4, 1871 – January 8, 1873	27th	Elected in 1870; Was not re-elected in 1872	Alexander
District abolished with 1872 Reapportionment as 3 Representatives were now elected cumulatively from Legislative districts.

=== 1957 – 1973 ===
Representative	Party	Party Control	Years (Note: Since 1970, the GA meets on the second Wednesday of January for a new session.)	General Assembly (GA)	Electoral history	Counties represented
District re-established in 1957
Jack E. Walker	Republican	2 Republicans; 1 Democrat	January 9, 1957 – January 6, 1965	70th 71st 72nd 73rd	Elected in 1956; Re-elected in 1958; Re-elected in 1960; Re-elected in 1962; Did not run in At-large election	Cook
Maurino Richton	Republican	2 Republicans; 1 Democrat	January 9, 1957 – January 4, 1961	70th 71st	Elected in 1956; Re-elected in 1958; Retired.	Cook
Anthony Scariano	Democratic	2 Republicans; 1 Democrat	January 9, 1957 – January 6, 1965	70th 71st 72nd 73rd	Elected in 1956; Re-elected in 1958; Re-elected in 1960; Re-elected in 1962; Re-elected to At-large district	Cook
Edwin A. McGowan	Republican	2 Republicans; 1 Democrat	January 4, 1961 – January 6, 1965	72nd 73rd	Elected in 1960; Re-elected in 1962; Did not run in At-large election	Cook
The district was temporarily abolished from 1965 to 1967 due to the Redistricting Commission in 1963 failing to reach an agreement. An at-large election was held electing 177 Representatives from across the state.
Frances L. Dawson	Republican	2 Republicans; 1 Democrat	January 4, 1967 – January 13, 1971	75th 76th	Redistricted from At-large district and re-elected in 1966. Re-elected in 1968; Ran for Trustee of the University of Illinois and lost.	Cook
Alan R. Johnston	Republican	2 Republicans; 1 Democrat	January 4, 1967 – January 13, 1971	75th 76th	Redistricted from At-large district and re-elected in 1966. Re-elected in 1968; Retired.	Cook
Harold A. Katz	Democratic	2 Republicans; 1 Democrat	January 4, 1967 – January 10, 1973	75th 76th 77th	Redistricted from At-large district and re-elected in 1966. Re-elected in 1968; Re-elected in 1970; Re-districted to 1st Legislative district and re-elected in 1972	Cook
Brian Barnett Duff	Republican	2 Republicans; 1 Democrat	January 13, 1971 – January 10, 1973	77th	Elected in 1970; Redistricted to 1st Legislative district and re-elected in 1972	Cook
Bradley M. Glass	Republican	2 Republicans; 1 Democrat	January 13, 1971 – January 10, 1973	77th	Elected in 1970; Ran for Illinois Senate in the 1st Legislative district in 1972 and won.	Cook
District abolished with 1971 Reapportionment as Representatives were once again elected from Legislative districts.

=== 1983 – present ===
Representative	Party	Years	General Assembly (GA)	Electoral history	Counties represented
District re-established and representatives were now elected one per district with the passage of the Cutback Amendment.
Alan J. Greiman	Democratic	January 12, 1983 – ???	83rd 84th	Redistricted from the 15th district and re-elected in 1982; Re-elected in 1984; Re-elected in 1986; Appointed as a Judge to Circuit Court of Cook County in 1987	Cook
Alan J. Greiman	Democratic	January 12, 1983 – ???	85th	Redistricted from the 15th district and re-elected in 1982; Re-elected in 1984; Re-elected in 1986; Appointed as a Judge to Circuit Court of Cook County in 1987	Cook
Vacant		??? – July 1987	85th		Cook
Lou Lang	Democratic	July 1987 – January 13, 1993	85th	Appointed July 1987; Elected in 1988; Re-elected in 1990; Redistricted to the 16th Representative district	Cook
Lou Lang	Democratic	July 1987 – January 13, 1993	86th 87th	Appointed July 1987; Elected in 1988; Re-elected in 1990; Redistricted to the 16th Representative district	Cook
Rafael "Ray" Frias	Democratic	January 13, 1993 – ???	88th	Elected in 1992; Re-elected in 1994; Resigned before the end of the 88th GA.	Cook
Vacant		??? – April 1, 1995	88th		Cook
Vacant		??? – April 1, 1995	89th		Cook
Fernando A. Frias	Democratic	April 1, 1995 – January 8, 1997	89th	Appointed April 1, 1995; Retired.	Cook
Sonia Silva	Democratic	January 8, 1997 – January 10, 2001	90th 91st	Elected in 1996; Re-elected in 1998; Lost renomination.	Cook
Suzana Mendoza	Democratic	January 10, 2001 – May 16, 2011	92nd 93rd 94th 95th 96th	Elected in 2000; Re-elected in 2002; Re-elected in 2004; Re-elected in 2006; Re-elected in 2008; Re-elected in 2010; Elected City Clerk of Chicago in 2011 and resigned her Representative seat	Cook
Suzana Mendoza	Democratic	January 10, 2001 – May 16, 2011	97th	Elected in 2000; Re-elected in 2002; Re-elected in 2004; Re-elected in 2006; Re-elected in 2008; Re-elected in 2010; Elected City Clerk of Chicago in 2011 and resigned her Representative seat	Cook
Vacant		May 16, 2011 – May 2011	97th		Cook
Dena M. Carli	Democratic	May 2011 – January 9, 2013	97th	Appointed in May 2011; Retired.	Cook
Daniel J. Burke	Democratic	January 9, 2013 – December 30, 2018	98th 99th	Redistricted from the 23rd Representative district and re-elected in 2012. Re-elected in 2014; Re-elected in 2016; Lost renomination and retired before the end of the 100th GA.	Cook
Daniel J. Burke	Democratic	January 9, 2013 – December 30, 2018	100th	Redistricted from the 23rd Representative district and re-elected in 2012. Re-elected in 2014; Re-elected in 2016; Lost renomination and retired before the end of the 100th GA.	Cook
Vacant		December 30, 2018 – January 9, 2019	100th		Cook
Aaron Ortiz	Democratic	January 9, 2019 – present	101st 102nd 103rd	Elected in 2018; Re-elected in 2020; Re-elected in 2022	Cook

== Historic District Boundaries ==
Years	County	Municipalities/Townships	Notes
2023 – present	Cook	Chicago (Archer Heights, Bridgeport, Brighton Park, Chicago Lawn, Gage Park, Garfield Ridge, McKinley Park, New City, West Elsdon), Forest View, Stickney	
2013 – 2023	Cook	Chicago (Archer Heights, Brighton Park, Chicago Lawn, Garfield Ridge, New City, and West Elsdon), Forest View	
2003 – 2013	Cook	Chicago	
1993 – 2003	Cook	Chicago	
1983 – 1993	Cook	Parts of Jefferson Township, parts of Lake View Township, parts of Niles Township, parts of Rogers Park Township, Chicago	
1967 – 1973	Cook	Evanston Township, parts of Northfield Township, New Trier Township, parts of Niles Township	
1957 – 1965	Cook	Bloom Township, Calumet Township, Rich Township, Thornton Township	
1871 – 1873	Alexander	Cairo, Dogtooth, Goose Island, Santa Fe, Thebes, Unity	
1849 – 1871	Alexander; Pulaski; Union	America, Cairo, Caledonia, Clear Creek, Cobden, Elvira, Fulton, Hamburg, Jonesboro, Mill Creek, Mound City, Mounds, Mount Pleasant, Napoleon, North Caledonia, Pulaski, Santa Fe, Thebes, Toledo, Trinity, Ullin, Union Point, Unity, Villa Ridge, Western Saratoga, Wetaug	

== Electoral history ==
=== 2030 – 2022 ===
2022 Illinois House of Representatives election
Party	Candidate	Votes	%
Democratic	Aaron M. Ortiz (incumbent)	11,611	100.0
Total votes		11,611	100.0

=== 2020 – 2012 ===
2020 Illinois House of Representatives election
Party	Candidate	Votes	%	±%
Democratic	Aaron M. Ortiz (incumbent)	21,204	100.0	N/A
Total votes		21,204	100.0	

2018 Illinois House of Representatives election
Party	Candidate	Votes	%	±%
Democratic	Aaron M. Ortiz	16,913	100.0	N/A
Total votes		16,913	100.0	

2018 Illinois House of Representatives Democratic primary
Party	Candidate	Votes	%
Democratic	Aaron M. Ortiz	5,636	53.12
Democratic	Daniel J. Burke (incumbent)	4,974	46.88
Total votes		10,610	100.0

2016 Illinois House of Representatives election
Party	Candidate	Votes	%	±%
Democratic	Daniel J. Burke (incumbent)	21,609	100.0	N/A
Total votes		21,609	100.0	

2014 Illinois House of Representatives election
Party	Candidate	Votes	%	±%
Democratic	Daniel J. Burke (incumbent)	11,710	100.0	N/A
Total votes		11,710	100.0	

2012 Illinois House of Representatives election
Party	Candidate	Votes	%	±%
Democratic	Daniel J. Burke	18,561	100.0	N/A
Total votes		18,561	100.0	

=== 2010 – 2002 ===
2010 Illinois House of Representatives election
Party	Candidate	Votes	%	±%
Democratic	Susana Mendoza (incumbent)	7,210	100.0	N/A
Total votes		7,210	100.0	

2008 Illinois House of Representatives election
Party	Candidate	Votes	%	±%
Democratic	Susana Mendoza (incumbent)	12,132	100.0	+9.12%
Total votes		12,132	100.0	

2006 Illinois House of Representatives election
Party	Candidate	Votes	%	±%
Democratic	Susana Mendoza (incumbent)	8,669	90.88	−9.12%
Republican	Suzanne Ramos	870	9.12	N/A
Total votes		9,539	100.0	

2004 Illinois House of Representatives election
Party	Candidate	Votes	%	±%
Democratic	Susana Mendoza (incumbent)	11,264	100.0	N/A
Total votes		11,264	100.0	

2002 Illinois House of Representatives election
Party	Candidate	Votes	%	±%
Democratic	Susana Mendoza (incumbent)	7,456	100.0	N/A
Total votes		7,456	100.0	

=== 2000 – 1992 ===
2000 Illinois House of Representatives election
Party	Candidate	Votes	%	±%
Democratic	Susana Mendoza	10,054	100.0	+18.83%
Total votes		10,054	100.0	

2000 Illinois House of Representatives Democratic primary
Party	Candidate	Votes	%
Democratic	Susana Mendoza	4,343	55.16
Democratic	Sonia Silva (incumbent)	3,530	44.84
Total votes		7,873	100.0

1998 Illinois House of Representatives election
Party	Candidate	Votes	%	±%
Democratic	Sonia Silva (incumbent)	6,237	81.17	−18.83%
Republican	Theresa Garcia	1,447	18.83	N/A
Total votes		7,684	100.0	

1996 Illinois House of Representatives election
Party	Candidate	Votes	%	±%
Democratic	Sonia Silva	9,832	100.0	N/A
Total votes		9,832	100.0	

1994 Illinois House of Representatives election
Party	Candidate	Votes	%	±%
Democratic	Rafael "Ray" Frias (incumbent)	5,642	100.0	N/A
Total votes		5,642	100.0	

1992 Illinois House of Representatives election
Party	Candidate	Votes	%	±%
Democratic	Rafael "Ray" Frias	10,342	100.0	+33.58%
Total votes		10,342	100.0	

=== 1990 – 1982 ===
1990 Illinois House of Representatives election
Party	Candidate	Votes	%	±%
Democratic	Louis I. Lang (incumbent)	18,399	66.42	+5.95%
Republican	Peggy Agnos	9,301	33.57	−5.95%
Total votes		27,700	100.0	

1988 Illinois House of Representatives election
Party	Candidate	Votes	%	±%
Democratic	Louis I. Lang (incumbent)	24,361	60.47	−5.92%
Republican	Kenneth H. Hollander	15,919	39.52	+5.92%
Total votes		40,280	100.0	

1986 Illinois House of Representatives election
Party	Candidate	Votes	%	±%
Democratic	Alan J. Greiman (incumbent)	20,162	66.39	+3.50%
Republican	Kenneth H. Hollander	10,204	33.60	−3.51%
Total votes		30,366	100.0	

1984 Illinois House of Representatives election
Party	Candidate	Votes	%	±%
Democratic	Alan J. Greiman (incumbent)	27,216	62.89	−11.98%
Republican	Lenore Picker Janecek	16,060	37.11	+11.98%
Write-in		1	0.00	N/A
Total votes		43,277	100.0	

1982 Illinois House of Representatives election
Party	Candidate	Votes	%
Democratic	Alan J. Greiman (incumbent)	26,285	74.87
Republican	John "Bill" Handzel, Sr.	8,822	25.13
Total votes		35,107	100.0

=== 1970 – 1962 ===
1970 Illinois House of Representatives election
Party	Candidate	Votes	%
Republican	Brian B. Duff	69,094	32.16
Democratic	Harold A. Katz (incumbent)	63,541	29.57
Republican	Bradley M. Glass	55,039	25.62
Democratic	Claude L. Carney	27,180.5	12.65
Write-in		3	0.00
Total votes		214,857.5	100.0

1968 Illinois House of Representatives election
Party	Candidate	Votes	%
Republican	Frances L. Dawson (incumbent)	94,935	36.22
Republican	Alan R. Johnston (incumbent)	75,662.5	28.87
Democratic	Harold A. Katz (incumbent)	60,288	23.00
Democratic	Henry T. Synek	31,193.5	11.90
Total votes		262,079	100.0

1966 Illinois House of Representatives election
Party	Candidate	Votes	%
Republican	Frances L. Dawson (incumbent)	87,563.5	39.17
Republican	Alan R. Johnston (incumbent)	70,047	31.33
Democratic	Harold A. Katz (incumbent)	44,448	19.88
Democratic	James B. Moran (incumbent)	21,492.5	9.61
Total votes		223,551	100.0

1962 Illinois House of Representatives election
Party	Candidate	Votes	%
Republican	Jack E. Walker (incumbent)	79,543.5	29.42
Republican	Edwin A. McGowan (incumbent)	75,402.5	27.89
Democratic	Anthony Scariano (incumbent)	63,492.5	23.49
Democratic	Mary Lee Inger	51,914	19.20
Total votes		270,352.5	100.0

=== 1960 – 1956 ===
1960 Illinois House of Representatives election
Party	Candidate	Votes	%
Republican	Jack E. Walker (incumbent)	94,374.5	27.74
Republican	Edwin A. McGowan	87,348	25.68
Democratic	Anthony Scariano (incumbent)	86,159	25.33
Democratic	Mary Lee Inger	72,280	21.25
Total votes		340,161.5	100.0

1958 Illinois House of Representatives election
Party	Candidate	Votes	%
Republican	Jack E. Walker (incumbent)	60,541.5	27.92
Democratic	Anthony Scariano (incumbent)	58,326.5	26.90
Republican	Maurino R. Richton (incumbent)	55,572.5	25.63
Democratic	Frank D. Novak	42,423.5	19.56
Total votes		216,864	100.0

1956 Illinois House of Representatives election
Party	Candidate	Votes	%
Republican	Jack E. Walker	81,525.5	30.91
Republican	Maurino R. Richton	77,711	29.46
Democratic	Anthony Scariano	55,405.5	21.01
Democratic	Henry X. Dietch	49,119	18.62
Total votes		263,761	100.0
