= Maurino =

Maurino is the name of several rural localities in Russia:

- Maurino, Ivanovo Oblast
- Maurino, Mayskoye Rural Settlement, Vologodsky District, Vologda Oblast
- Maurino, Podlesnoye Rural Settlement, Vologodsky District, Vologda Oblast
- Maurino, Sheksninsky District, Vologda Oblast
- Maurino, Spasskoye Rural Settlement, Vologodsky District, Vologda Oblast

== See also ==
- Juantxo García-Mauriño (born 1964), Spanish field hockey player
- Maurino Richton (1909–1995), American politician and lawyer
