= 2016 Illinois House of Representatives election =

- November 8, 2016

All 118 seats in the Illinois House of Representatives 60 seats needed for a majority
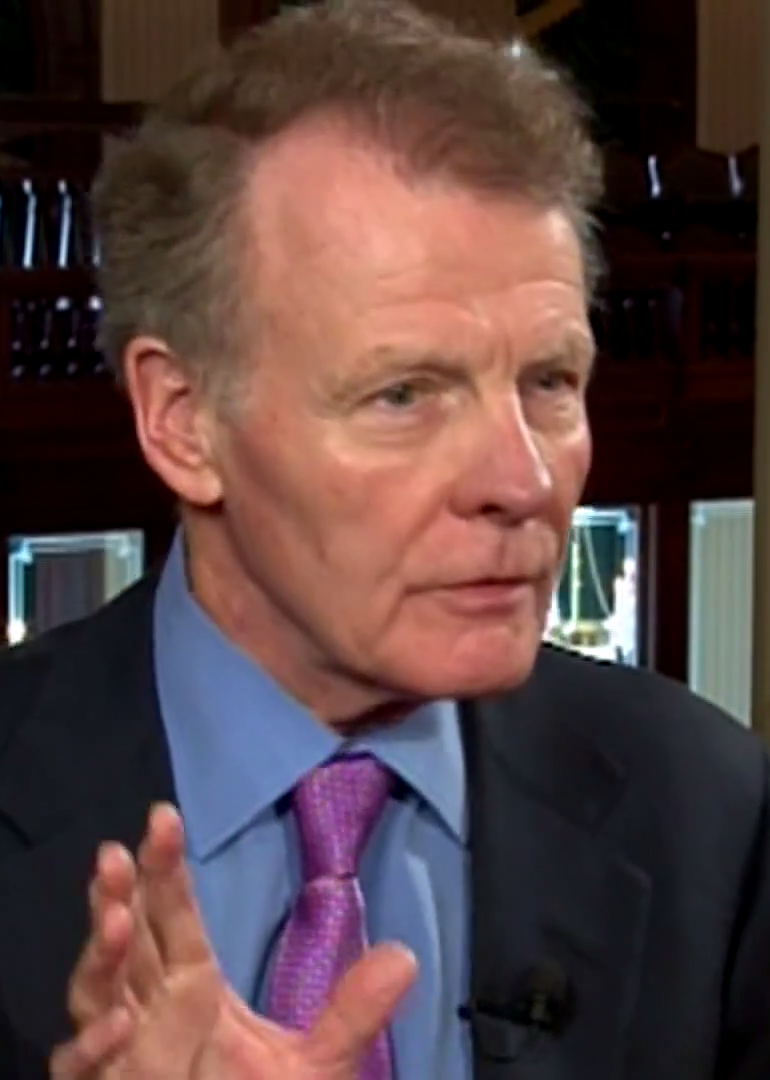

	Majority party	Minority party
Leader	Michael Madigan	Jim Durkin
Party	Democratic	Republican
Leader's seat	22nd-Chicago	82nd-Westchester
Last election	71	47
Seats won	67	51
Seat change	▼4	▲4
Popular vote	2,604,236	2,222,482
Percentage	53.87%	45.97%
Swing	▲3.38%	▼3.36%
- Democratic gain Republican gain Democratic hold Republican hold 50–60% 60–70% 70–80% 80–90% >90% 50–60% 60–70% 70–80% >90%
Speaker before election
Michael Madigan
Democratic
Speaker-Elect
Michael Madigan
Democratic

The 2016 Elections for the Illinois House of Representatives were conducted on Tuesday, November 8, 2016. State Representatives are elected for two-year terms, with the entire House of Representatives elected every two years. The Democratic party lost a net of four seats and thus its three-fifths supermajority in the chamber. Republicans picked up five seats in the 63rd (McHenry County), 71st (Sterling), 76th (LaSalle), 79th (Kankakee), and 117th (Marion) districts, whilst the Democrats won the previously Republican held 112th district (Edwardsville/Collinsville)

== Overview ==
Illinois State House Elections, 2016
Party	Votes	Percentage	% Change	Seats before	Seats after	+/–
Democratic	2,604,236	53.87%	▲3.38%	71	67	▼4
Republican	2,222,482	45.97%	▼3.36%	47	51	▲4
Totals	4,834,247	100.00%	—	118	118	—

== Predictions ==
Source	Ranking	As of
Governing	Likely D	October 12, 2016

== Results ==
District	Party	Incumbent	Status	Party	Candidate	Votes	%
1	Democratic	Daniel J. Burke	Won	Democratic	Daniel J. Burke	21,609	100.00%
2	Democratic	Edward J. Acevedo	Retired	Democratic	Theresa Mah	23,813	100.00%
3	Democratic	Luis Arroyo	Won	Democratic	Luis Arroyo	24,178	100.00%
4	Democratic	Cynthia Soto	Won	Democratic	Cynthia Soto	34,077	100.00%
5	Democratic	Juliana Stratton	Won	Democratic	Juliana Stratton	40,747	100.00%
6	Democratic	Sonya Marie Harper	Won	Democratic	Sonya Marie Harper	32,904	100.00%
7	Democratic	Emanuel "Chris" Welch	Won	Democratic	Emanuel "Chris" Welch	39,914	100.00%
8	Democratic	La Shawn K. Ford	Won	Democratic	La Shawn K. Ford	38,493	100.00%
9	Democratic	Arthur Turner	Won	Democratic	Arthur Turner	36,765	100.00%
10	Democratic	Pamela Reaves-Harris	Retired	Democratic	Melissa Conyears	35,858	7.61%
10	Democratic	Pamela Reaves-Harris	Retired	Republican	Mark Spognardi	6,911	1.47%
11	Democratic	Ann M. Williams	Won	Democratic	Ann M. Williams	38,028	7.99%
11	Democratic	Ann M. Williams	Won	Republican	Gary Mandell	15,115	3.18%
12	Democratic	Sara Feigenholtz	Won	Democratic	Sara Feigenholtz	43,858	75.59%
12	Democratic	Sara Feigenholtz	Won	Republican	Gene Witt	14,161	24.41%
13	Democratic	Gregory Harris	Won	Democratic	Gregory Harris	40,831	100.00%
14	Democratic	Kelly M. Cassidy	Won	Democratic	Kelly M. Cassidy	35,989	83.22%
14	Democratic	Kelly M. Cassidy	Won	Independent	Arthur Noah Siegel	7,259	16.78%
15	Democratic	John C. D'Amico	Won	Democratic	John C. D'Amico	25,586	61.48%
15	Democratic	John C. D'Amico	Won	Republican	Jonathan Edelman	16,030	38.52%
16	Democratic	Lou Lang	Won	Democratic	Lou Lang	29,719	100.00%
17	Democratic	Laura Fine	Won	Democratic	Laura Fine	42,198	100.00%
18	Democratic	Robyn Gabel	Won	Democratic	Robyn Gabel	36,794	64.13%
18	Democratic	Robyn Gabel	Won	Republican	Jessica Tucker	20,580	35.87%
19	Democratic	Robert Martwick	Won	Democratic	Robert Martwick	30,537	100.00%
20	Republican	Michael P. McAuliffe	Won	Republican	Michael P. McAuliffe	25,739	56.10%
20	Republican	Michael P. McAuliffe	Won	Democratic	Merry Marwig	20,142	43.90%
21	Democratic	Silvana Tabares	Won	Democratic	Silvana Tabares	20,370	100.00%
22	Democratic	Michael J. Madigan	Won	Democratic	Michael J. Madigan	27,715	100.00%
23	Democratic	Michael J. Zalewski	Won	Democratic	Michael J. Zalewski	25,097	100.00%
24	Democratic	Elizabeth "Lisa" Hernandez	Won	Democratic	Elizabeth "Lisa" Hernandez	23,079	79.45%
24	Democratic	Elizabeth "Lisa" Hernandez	Won	Republican	Andy Kirchoff	5,969	20.55%
25	Democratic	Barbara Flynn Currie	Won	Democratic	Barbara Flynn Currie	37,937	100.00%
26	Democratic	Christian L. Mitchell	Won	Democratic	Christian L. Mitchell	40,251	100.00%
27	Democratic	Monique D. Davis	Won	Democratic	Monique D. Davis	42,558	100.00%
28	Democratic	Robert "Bob" Rita	Won	Democratic	Robert "Bob" Rita	37,190	100.00%
29	Democratic	Thaddeus Jones	Won	Democratic	Thaddeus Jones	42,740	100.00%
30	Democratic	William "Will" Davis	Won	Democratic	William "Will" Davis	34,641	100.00%
31	Democratic	Mary E. Flowers	Won	Democratic	Mary E. Flowers	36,904	100.00%
32	Democratic	André Thapedi	Won	Democratic	André Thapedi	29,118	100.00%
33	Democratic	Marcus C. Evans, Jr.	Won	Democratic	Marcus C. Evans, Jr.	40,046	100.00%
34	Democratic	Elgie R. Sims, Jr.	Won	Democratic	Elgie R. Sims, Jr.	39,961	100.00%
35	Democratic	Frances Ann Hurley	Won	Democratic	Frances Ann Hurley	34,506	65.62%
35	Democratic	Frances Ann Hurley	Won	Republican	Victor Horne	18,081	34.38%
36	Democratic	Kelly M. Burke	Won	Democratic	Kelly M. Burke	38,047	100.00%
37	Republican	Margo McDermed	Won	Republican	Margo McDermed	45,721	100.00%
38	Democratic	Al Riley	Won	Democratic	Al Riley	42,819	100.00%
39	Democratic	Will Guzzardi	Won	Democratic	Will Guzzardi	29,170	100.00%
40	Democratic	Jaime M. Andrade, Jr.	Won	Democratic	Jaime M. Andrade, Jr.	29,845	100.00%
41	Republican	Grant Wehrli	Won	Republican	Grant Wehrli	42,654	100.00%
42	Republican	Jeanne M. Ives	Won	Republican	Jeanne M. Ives	33,443	60.80%
42	Republican	Jeanne M. Ives	Won	Democratic	Kathleen V. Carrier	21,560	39.20%
43	Democratic	Anna Moeller	Won	Democratic	Anna Moeller	22,274	98.97%
43	Democratic	Anna Moeller	Won	Independent	Richard Evans	231	1.03%
44	Democratic	Fred Crespo	Won	Democratic	Fred Crespo	22,102	62.79%
44	Democratic	Fred Crespo	Won	Republican	Katy Dolan Baumer	13,098	37.21%
45	Republican	Christine Jennifer Winger	Won	Republican	Christine Jennifer Winger	25,876	53.36%
45	Republican	Christine Jennifer Winger	Won	Democratic	Cynthia Borbas	22,618	46.64%
46	Democratic	Deb Conroy	Won	Democratic	Deb Conroy	23,369	58.97%
46	Democratic	Deb Conroy	Won	Republican	Heidi Holan	16,257	41.03%
47	Republican	Patricia R. "Patti" Bellock	Won	Republican	Patricia R. "Patti" Bellock	45,196	100.00%
48	Republican	Peter Breen	Won	Republican	Peter Breen	30,793	56.53%
48	Republican	Peter Breen	Won	Democratic	Steve Swanson	23,676	43.47%
49	Republican	Mike Fortner	Won	Republican	Mike Fortner	35,353	100.00%
50	Republican	Keith R. Wheeler	Won	Republican	Keith R. Wheeler	31,659	60.32%
50	Republican	Keith R. Wheeler	Won	Democratic	Valerie L. Burd	20,830	39.68%
51	Republican	Ed Sullivan, Jr.	Retired	Republican	Nick Sauer	46,098	100.00%
52	Republican	David McSweeney	Won	Republican	David McSweeney	40,392	99.97%
52	Republican	David McSweeney	Won	Independent	Chris Bauman	11	0.03%
53	Republican	David Harris	Won	Republican	David Harris	38,809	100.00%
54	Republican	Tom Morrison	Won	Republican	Tom Morrison	38,846	100.00%
55	Democratic	Martin J. Moylan	Won	Democratic	Martin J. Moylan	25,717	59.08%
55	Democratic	Martin J. Moylan	Won	Republican	Dan Gott	17,811	40.92%
56	Democratic	Michelle Mussman	Won	Democratic	Michelle Mussman	24,890	55.83%
56	Democratic	Michelle Mussman	Won	Republican	Jillian Rose Bernas	19,693	44.17%
57	Democratic	Elaine Nekritz	Won	Democratic	Elaine Nekritz	29,297	100.00%
58	Democratic	Scott Drury	Won	Democratic	Scott Drury	29,338	57.42%
58	Democratic	Scott Drury	Won	Republican	Martin (Marty) Blumenthal	21,756	42.58%
59	Democratic	Carol Sente	Won	Democratic	Carol Sente	25,908	60.87%
59	Democratic	Carol Sente	Won	Republican	Dawn Abernathy	16,656	39.13%
60	Democratic	Rita Mayfield	Won	Democratic	Rita Mayfield	22,402	76.43%
60	Democratic	Rita Mayfield	Won	Republican	Robert L. Ochsner	6,909	23.57%
61	Republican	Sheri Jesiel	Won	Republican	Sheri Jesiel	26,692	57.23%
61	Republican	Sheri Jesiel	Won	Democratic	Nick Ciko	19,947	42.77%
62	Democratic	Sam Yingling	Won	Democratic	Sam Yingling	22,050	52.45%
62	Democratic	Sam Yingling	Won	Republican	Rod Drobinski	19,993	47.55%
63	Democratic	Jack D. Franks	Retired	Republican	Steven Reick	25,699	56.47%
63	Democratic	Jack D. Franks	Retired	Democratic	John M. Bartman	19,808	43.53%
64	Republican	Barbara Wheeler	Won	Republican	Barbara Wheeler	41,873	100.00%
65	Republican	Steven A. Andersson	Won	Republican	Steven A. Andersson	42,499	100.00%
66	Republican	Michael W. Tryon	Retired	Republican	Allen Skillicorn	27,295	57.61%
66	Republican	Michael W. Tryon	Retired	Democratic	Nancy A. Zettler	20,083	42.39%
67	Democratic	Litesa E. Wallace	Won	Democratic	Litesa E. Wallace	25,420	100.00%
68	Republican	John M. Cabello	Won	Republican	John M. Cabello	31,139	63.82%
68	Republican	John M. Cabello	Won	Democratic	Tricia Sweeney	17,655	36.18%
69	Republican	Joe Sosnowski	Won	Republican	Joe Sosnowski	32,961	67.28%
69	Republican	Joe Sosnowski	Won	Democratic	Angelique A. Bodine	16,032	32.72%
70	Republican	Robert W. Pritchard	Won	Republican	Robert W. Pritchard	36,601	99.98%
70	Republican	Robert W. Pritchard	Won	Independent	Brian Solar	8	0.02%
71	Democratic	Mike Smiddy	Defeated	Republican	Tony M. McCombie	30,635	62.88%
71	Democratic	Mike Smiddy	Defeated	Democratic	Mike Smiddy	18,082	37.12%
72	Democratic	Patrick J. Verschoore	Retired	Democratic	Michael W. Halpin	25,014	56.39%
72	Democratic	Patrick J. Verschoore	Retired	Republican	Brandi Mcguire	19,342	43.61%
73	Republican	David R. Leitch	Retired	Republican	Ryan Spain	47,626	100.00%
74	Republican	Donald L. Moffitt	Retired	Republican	Daniel M. Swanson	34,567	65.53%
74	Republican	Donald L. Moffitt	Retired	Democratic	Bill Butts	18,185	34.47%
75	Republican	David Allen Welter	Won	Republican	David Allen Welter	29,030	58.21%
75	Republican	David Allen Welter	Won	Democratic	Martha J. Shugart	20,833	41.78%
75	Republican	David Allen Welter	Won	Independent	Willard H. Harper, Jr.	6	0.01%
76	Democratic	Andy Skoog	Defeated	Republican	Jerry Lee Long	23,557	50.86%
76	Democratic	Andy Skoog	Defeated	Democratic	Andy Skoog	22,759	49.14%
77	Democratic	Kathleen Willis	Won	Democratic	Kathleen Willis	20,806	70.37%
77	Democratic	Kathleen Willis	Won	Republican	Anthony Airdo	8,762	29.63%
78	Democratic	Camille Lilly	Won	Democratic	Camille Lilly	41,233	100.00%
79	Democratic	Katherine "Kate" Cloonen	Defeated	Republican	Lindsay Parkhurst	23,728	53.71%
79	Democratic	Katherine "Kate" Cloonen	Defeated	Democratic	Katherine "Kate" Cloonen	20,450	46.29%
80	Democratic	Anthony Deluca	Won	Democratic	Anthony Deluca	38,766	100.00%
81	Republican	David S. Olsen	Won	Republican	David S. Olsen	29,406	53.40%
81	Republican	David S. Olsen	Won	Democratic	Greg Hose	25,660	46.60%
82	Republican	Jim Durkin	Won	Republican	Jim Durkin	45,529	100.00%
83	Democratic	Linda Chapa LaVia	Won	Democratic	Linda Chapa LaVia	20,959	100.00%
84	Democratic	Stephanie A. Kifowit	Won	Democratic	Stephanie A. Kifowit	24,183	62.94%
84	Democratic	Stephanie A. Kifowit	Won	Republican	Mike Strick	14,242	37.06%
85	Democratic	Emily McAsey	Won	Democratic	Emily McAsey	33,236	100.00%
86	Democratic	Lawrence "Larry" Walsh, Jr.	Won	Democratic	Lawrence "Larry" Walsh, Jr.	33,342	100.00%
87	Republican	Tim Butler	Won	Republican	Tim Butler	41,483	100.00%
88	Republican	Keith P. Sommer	Won	Republican	Keith P. Sommer	44,223	100.00%
89	Republican	Brian W. Stewart	Won	Republican	Brian W. Stewart	42,157	100.00%
90	Republican	Tom Demmer	Won	Republican	Tom Demmer	40,456	100.00%
91	Republican	Michael D. Unes	Won	Republican	Michael D. Unes	38,682	100.00%
92	Democratic	Jehan Gordon-Booth	Won	Democratic	Jehan Gordon-Booth	33,410	100.00%
93	Republican	Norine K. Hammond	Won	Republican	Norine K. Hammond	22,985	54.53%
93	Republican	Norine K. Hammond	Won	Democratic	John Curtis	19,163	45.47%
94	Republican	Randy E. Frese	Won	Republican	Randy E. Frese	37,408	75.16%
94	Republican	Randy E. Frese	Won	Democratic	Bobby Pritchett	12,364	24.84%
94	Republican	Randy E. Frese	Won	Independent	Roger Davis	1	0.00%
95	Republican	Avery Bourne	Won	Republican	Avery Bourne	27,601	56.90%
95	Republican	Avery Bourne	Won	Democratic	Mike Mathis	20,898	43.08%
95	Republican	Avery Bourne	Won	Independent	Jake Leonard	13	0.03%
96	Democratic	Sue Scherer	Won	Democratic	Sue Scherer	32,852	100.00%
97	Republican	Mark Batinick	Won	Republican	Mark Batinick	42,312	100.00%
98	Democratic	Natalie A. Manley	Won	Democratic	Natalie A. Manley	38,650	100.00%
99	Republican	Sara Wojcicki Jimenez	Won	Republican	Sara Wojcicki Jimenez	35,363	61.45%
99	Republican	Sara Wojcicki Jimenez	Won	Democratic	Anthony "Tony" Delgiorno	22,188	38.55%
100	Republican	Christopher "C.D." Davidsmeyer	Won	Republican	Christopher "C.D." Davidsmeyer	41,488	100.00%
101	Republican	Bill Mitchell	Won	Republican	Bill Mitchell	41,728	75.34%
101	Republican	Bill Mitchell	Won	Democratic	Christine Law	13,661	24.66%
102	Republican	Adam M. Brown	Retired	Republican	Brad Halbrook	42,559	100.00%
103	Democratic	Carol Ammons	Won	Democratic	Carol Ammons	34,071	100.00%
104	Republican	Chad Hays	Won	Republican	Chad Hays	35,556	100.00%
105	Republican	Dan Brady	Won	Republican	Dan Brady	43,961	100.00%
106	Republican	Thomas M. Bennett	Won	Republican	Thomas M. Bennett	41,047	100.00%
107	Republican	John Cavaletto	Won	Republican	John Cavaletto	41,739	100.00%
108	Republican	Charles Meier	Won	Republican	Charles Meier	48,339	100.00%
109	Republican	David B. Reis	Won	Republican	David B. Reis	44,451	100.00%
110	Republican	Reginald "Reggie" Phillips	Won	Republican	Reginald "Reggie" Phillips	29,398	64.58%
110	Republican	Reginald "Reggie" Phillips	Won	Democratic	Dennis F. Malak	16,121	35.42%
111	Democratic	Daniel V. Beiser	Won	Democratic	Daniel V. Beiser	24,808	52.60%
111	Democratic	Daniel V. Beiser	Won	Republican	Mike Babcock	22,353	47.40%
112	Republican	Dwight Kay	Defeated	Democratic	Katie Stuart	27,594	51.61%
112	Republican	Dwight Kay	Defeated	Republican	Dwight Kay	25,875	48.39%
113	Democratic	Jay Hoffman	Won	Democratic	Jay Hoffman	26,816	59.13%
113	Democratic	Jay Hoffman	Won	Republican	Katherine L. Ruocco	18,536	40.87%
114	Democratic	Eddie Lee Jackson	Retired	Democratic	Latoya N. Greenwood	26,029	57.18%
114	Democratic	Eddie Lee Jackson	Retired	Republican	Bob Romanik	19,492	42.82%
115	Republican	Terri Bryant	Won	Republican	Terri Bryant	26,454	55.02%
115	Republican	Terri Bryant	Won	Democratic	Marsha Griffin	21,626	44.98%
116	Democratic	Jerry Costello II	Won	Democratic	Jerry Costello II	40,599	100.00%
117	Democratic	John Bradley	Defeated	Republican	Dave Severin	26,946	52.86%
117	Democratic	John Bradley	Defeated	Democratic	John Bradley	24,032	47.14%
118	Democratic	Brandon W. Phelps	Won	Democratic	Brandon W. Phelps	26,836	58.41%
118	Democratic	Brandon W. Phelps	Won	Republican	Jason V. Kasiar	19,108	41.59%

Source: Illinois State Board of Elections, Ballotpedia
