= Donald Moffitt (disambiguation) =

Donald Moffitt (1931–2014) was a science fiction writer.

Donald Moffitt is also the name of:

- Donald L. Moffitt (born 1947), Illinois state representative

== See also ==
- Don Moffett, American actor
- Donald Moffat (1930–2018), English-born American actor
