= Greiman =

Greiman is a surname. Notable people with the surname include:

- Alan J. Greiman (1931–2022), American judge and politician from Illinois
- April Greiman (born 1948), American designer

== See also ==
- Jane Greimann (1942–2006), American politician from Iowa
