= Susana Mendoza =

American politician (born 1972)

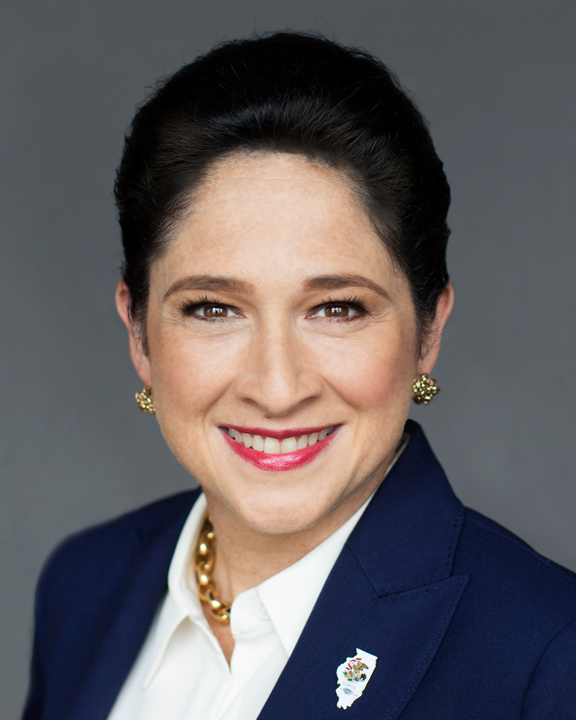
- Official portrait, 2018

10th Comptroller of Illinois
- Incumbent
- Assumed office December 5, 2016
- Governor: Bruce Rauner; JB Pritzker
- Preceded by: Leslie Munger

City Clerk of Chicago
- In office May 16, 2011 – December 5, 2016
- Preceded by: Miguel del Valle
- Succeeded by: Anna Valencia

Member of the Illinois House of Representatives from the 1st district
- In office January 10, 2001 – May 16, 2011
- Preceded by: Sonia Silva
- Succeeded by: Dena Carli

Personal details
- Born: May 13, 1972 (age 54) Chicago, Illinois, U.S.
- Party: Democratic
- Spouse: David Szostak (m. 2011)
- Children: 1
- Education: Truman State University (BA)
Association football career
- Position: Midfielder
Youth career
- 1986–1990: Bolingbrook Raiders
College career
Years	Team	Apps	(Gls)
1990–1994	Northeast Missouri; State Bulldogs	68	(10)

Susana A. Mendoza (born May 13, 1972) is an American politician. She is the 10th and current Comptroller of Illinois, taking office on December 5, 2016. She previously served as the City Clerk of Chicago from 2011 to 2016. Mendoza is a member of the Democratic Party, was the first Latina to be elected to the position of Illinois Comptroller, and is the highest ranking Hispanic elected official in Illinois. In 2022, Mendoza was the state of Illinois' top vote getter.

Mendoza was first elected as Illinois State Representative in 2000 and served six terms. In February 2011, she was elected City Clerk of Chicago, becoming the first woman to hold this position. She was twice elected City Clerk and served for five years before successfully running for the role of Illinois Comptroller in 2016. Mendoza ran unsuccessfully in the 2019 Chicago mayoral election.

In July 2025, Mendoza announced that she would not seek re-election in 2026. In June 2026, she announced her second candidacy for mayor of Chicago in the 2027 election.

== Early life and education ==
Mendoza was born in Chicago to Joaquin and Susana Mendoza, immigrants from Mexico who arrived in the 1960s. Due to violence in her Little Village neighborhood, her family relocated to Woodridge and later Bolingbrook, Illinois, during her childhood.

Mendoza completed her high school education at Bolingbrook High School in 1990, achieving All-State and All-Midwest honors in varsity soccer then pursued higher education at Northeast Missouri State University (now Truman State University), where she attended on a combined soccer and academic scholarship, graduating in 1994 with a Bachelor of Arts in Business Administration. During her college soccer career, from 1990 to 1994, she redshirted the 1993 season due to an injury sustained in the first game. Over her collegiate career, she made 68 appearances, scoring 10 goals and assisting another 10 for the Lady Bulldogs, also earning All-Midwest Honors.

After graduating, Mendoza returned to Chicago's Little Village neighborhood with her family. She began working full-time in the hospitality industry and later as an account executive at an advertising firm. In her free time, she became actively involved in community organizing within her neighborhood, which marked the start of her engagement in Chicago politics.

== Career ==
=== State representative (2001–2011) ===
In 1998, Mendoza ran for office in the 1st Legislative District with the support of the regular Democratic Organization but narrowly lost to independent progressive incumbent Sonia Silva, who was backed by House Speaker Mike Madigan. In 1999, with support from the Hispanic Democratic Organization, she coordinated a controversial aldermanic runoff campaign in Chicago's First Ward for Machine incumbent and mayoral loyalist Jesse Granato. The following year, with endorsements from Mayor Daley and the Hispanic Democratic Organization, Mendoza ran a second time to secure a position as an Illinois State Representative. At 28, she became the youngest member of the 92nd Illinois General Assembly.

During her tenure, Mendoza chaired the International Trade and Commerce Committee, Vice-chairwoman of the Bio-Technology Committee and was a member of the Labor, Public Utilities and Railroad Industry committees of the House. She co-chaired the Conference of Women Legislators, helped establish the first Illinois Legislative Latino Caucus, and passed a bill to provide school children with breakfast.

Mendoza served as an Illinois Democratic delegate in the primary elections for presidential candidates Al Gore in 2000 and John Kerry in 2004. In 2002, she visited the African countries of Uganda and Tanzania as a delegate for the American Council of Young Political Leaders. In June 2004, the State Department selected Mendoza to represent the National Democratic Party in Brazil, where she debated the party's presidential platform. In 2010, Mendoza was a member of a delegation of U.S. elected women from across the nation selected by the National Foundation for Women Legislators (NFWL) in conjunction with the U.S. Department of State, who served as official Election Observers of the Iraqi elections in Baghdad.

=== City Clerk of Chicago (2011–2016) ===
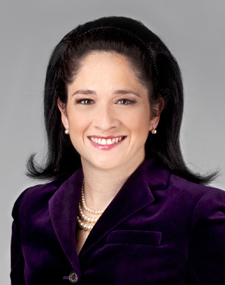
Mendoza was the first woman elected City Clerk in Chicago.

Mendoza was the first woman to hold the position of City Clerk in Chicago. As the 43rd City Clerk of Chicago, Mendoza used technology to modernize and improve city services, such as an online document management system and year-round city vehicle sticker sales. She also worked to modernize the city's infrastructure, including expanding services for minority and immigrant communities.

After her election in 2011, she managed an office that generated over $100 million annually from vehicle sticker sales. She reformed the city's vehicle sticker program from an annual event in place since 1908 to a year-round system, achieving an annual savings of approximately $4 million.

She initiated the Companion Animal and Consumer Protection Ordinance, which prohibited Chicago pet stores from selling dogs, cats or rabbits unless sourced from humane shelters or animal rescues.

=== 2019 Chicago mayoral candidacy ===
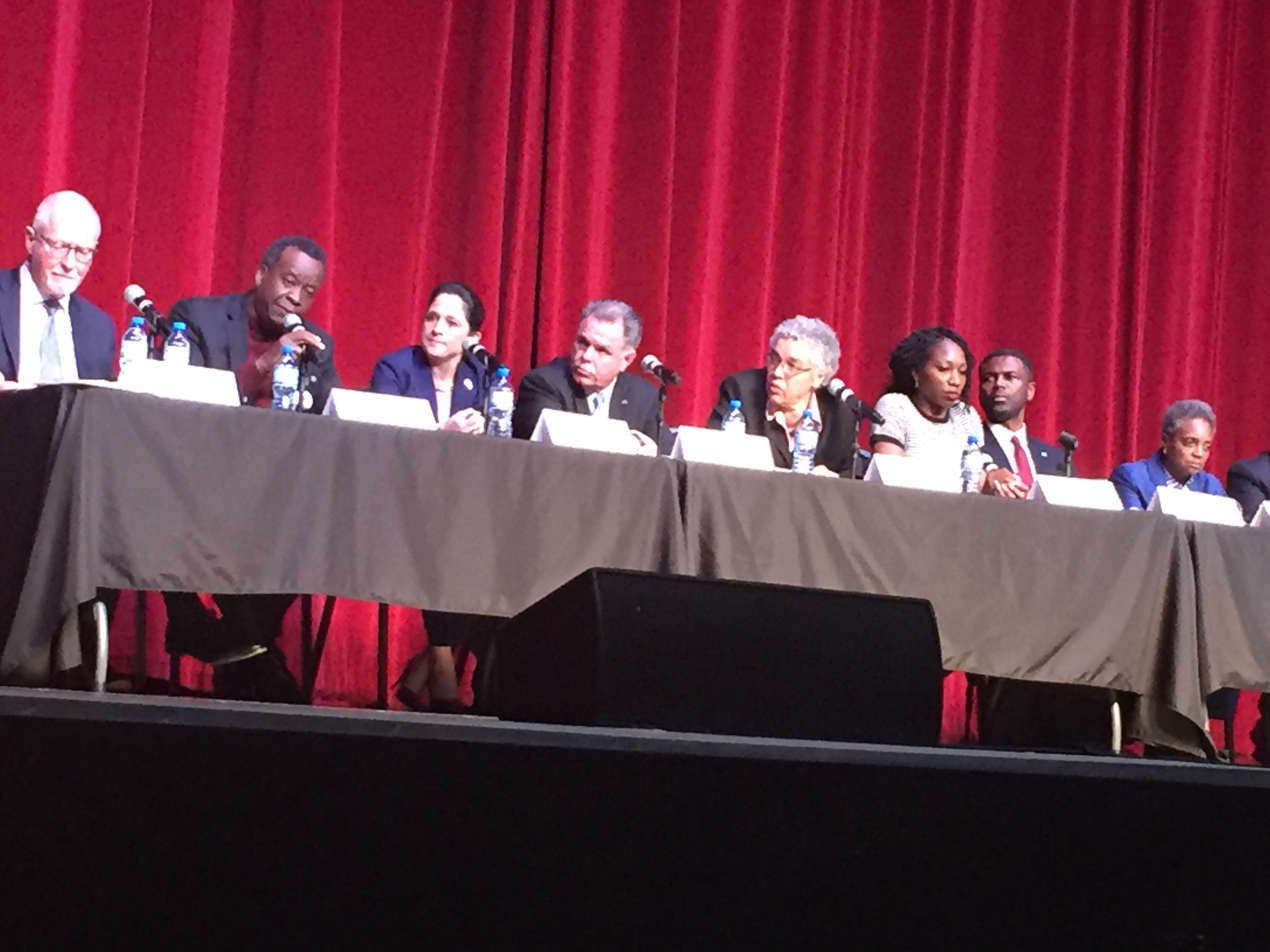
Mayoral candidates at a forum in December 2018; L–R: Paul Vallas, Willie Wilson, Mendoza, Gerry McCarthy, Toni Preckwinkle, Amara Enyia, La Shawn Ford, and Lori Lightfoot

On November 2, 2018, a video from Mendoza's campaign became public, showing her plans to run for Mayor of Chicago in 2019 while she was also seeking re-election as comptroller. She officially announced her mayoral candidacy on November 14, aiming to succeed Mayor Rahm Emanuel.

On December 14, 2018, another mayoral candidate, Toni Preckwinkle, contested Mendoza's 12,500 petition signatures required for ballot eligibility, citing potential fraud and inconsistencies. However, after a verification process, Preckwinkle withdrew her challenge on December 19, acknowledging that Mendoza had secured over 13,000 valid signatures.

During the early stages of her campaign, Mendoza was one of the leading candidates in both polling and fundraising. Public polls in late 2018 frequently showed Mendoza and Preckwinkle as the frontrunners. However, by January 2019, Mendoza's standing in polls fluctuated, and by February, she was not leading in any polls.

Preckwinkle and Mendoza, along with several candidates were linked to Alderman Edward M. Burke which influenced the mayoral race. She aimed to garner significant support from Hispanic voters. In the end, she received the highest support among Hispanic voters of any candidate in the first round. However, Hispanic voter turnout was low.

Mendoza's campaign was endorsed by labor activist Dolores Huerta and LIUNA Chicago Laborers’ District Council.

In mid-February, Mendoza and fellow contender Lori Lightfoot criticized Preckwinkle for holding a women-centered campaign rally, accusing her of portraying herself as a victim in light of a scandal involving her former chief of staff. Mendoza also critiqued another candidate, William M. Daley, which journalist Gregory Pratt later noted had impacted Daley's campaign negatively among union members.

Mendoza finished fifth in the primary election with 9.05% of the vote and did not advance to the runoff. On March 23, 2019, she endorsed Lori Lightfoot for mayor in the subsequent runoff election.

=== Illinois Comptroller (2016–present) ===
Mendoza assumed office as the Illinois Comptroller after a special election in December 2016. Since taking office, she has focused on improving Illinois' financial transparency and reducing its budget deficit. She reprioritized the office's work to pay social and human service providers first and led efforts to streamline financial reporting processes and modernize accounting systems.

==== Bill backlog and credit upgrades ====
Mendoza focused on paying down the state's $16.7 billion backlog of unpaid bills, focusing on those eligible for federal matching funds. By April 2021, she paid the backlog down to $3.5 billion. The backlog has stayed under $3 billion since later that year, helping usher in ten credit rating upgrades from the bond rating agencies. Some agencies cited her transparency reforms and monthly financial updates in their decisions, while S&P Global noted that her assurances that Illinois would prioritize debt payments increased investor confidence.

==== Debt Transparency Act ====
In her inaugural year, Mendoza spearheaded the Debt Transparency Act, which requires all state agencies to file monthly reports detailing outstanding bills, their age, and any accrued late-payment interest penalties. Despite being vetoed by the governor, the legislation passed after receiving unanimous support in the House of Representatives and a substantial majority in the State Senate.

==== Truth-in-Hiring and Vendor Payment Program Transparency Acts ====
During her second year, Mendoza supported three further transparency measures. These included the Truth-in-Hiring Act, which mandates that governors list all employees on their payroll instead of "off-shoring" them in other agency budgets; the Truth in Budgeting Act, which requires governors to account for Late Payment Interest Penalties in their budget proposals; and the Vendor Payment Program Transparency Act, which obliges lenders to state vendors to disclose their ownership and funding sources. The Comptroller's office now publishes a monthly report showing how much money has been lent and repaid under the program.

==== COVID Portal and curbing collections ====
In 2020, editorials in major state newspapers cited the transparency portal she developed as Comptroller, which tracked how Illinois spent every penny of federal COVID-19 relief money, and urged their own states to follow her example.

In 2020, Mendoza also announced that her office would stop withholding state payments from motorists who failed to pay red-light camera tickets. In 2021, she announced that her office would stop enforcing certain fines against low-income residents during the COVID-19 pandemic, including ending the withholding of unpaid fines from state income tax refunds for families eligible for the Earned Income Tax Credit, about $15 million annually.

==== Re-election ====
Mendoza was re-elected to a full term as comptroller in 2018, securing nearly 60% of the vote against Republican nominee Darlene Senger. In 2022, she was re-elected with 57% of the vote against Republican Shannon Teresi and was the top vote-getter in Illinois, ahead of Senator Tammy Duckworth and Governor J.B. Pritzker.

On July 16, 2025, Mendoza announced that she would not seek re-election in 2026.

=== 2027 Chicago mayoral election ===
On June 3, 2026, Mendoza announced her second candidacy for mayor of Chicago in the 2027 mayoral election, challenging incumbent Mayor Brandon Johnson. She launched her campaign at an event in Little Village after releasing a video promoting the message that "progress is greater than promises." In the announcement, Mendoza said Chicago should "work better for the people who built it" and argued that many residents felt abandoned by City Hall, citing rising rents, higher fees, and property taxes as key affordability concerns. Mendoza's campaign was noted for her stance on crime, with The New York Times writing that she was running "to the right" of Johnson’s agenda.

== Personal life ==
In December 2011, Mendoza married David Szostak, who attended Bolingbrook High School with her. In 2012, their son was born.

She serves on the board of advisors of Let America Vote, an organization founded by former Missouri Secretary of State Jason Kander that aims to end voter suppression.

== Electoral history ==
2000 Illinois State House 1st district Democratic primary
Party	Candidate	Votes	%
Democratic	Susana Mendoza	4,343	55.16
Democratic	Sonia Silva (incumbent)	3,530	44.84
Total votes		7,873	100

2000 Illinois State House 1st district election
Party	Candidate	Votes	%
Democratic	Susana Mendoza	10,054	100.00
Total votes		10,054	100

2002 Illinois State House 1st district Democratic primary
Party	Candidate	Votes	%
Democratic	Susana Mendoza (incumbent)	5,989	100.00
Total votes		5,989	100

2002 Illinois State House 1st district election
Party	Candidate	Votes	%
Democratic	Susana Mendoza (incumbent)	7,456	100.00
Total votes		7,456	100

2004 Illinois State House 1st district Democratic primary
Party	Candidate	Votes	%
Democratic	Susana Mendoza (incumbent)	3,888	100.00
Total votes		3,888	100

2004 Illinois State House 1st district election
Party	Candidate	Votes	%
Democratic	Susana Mendoza (incumbent)	11,264	100.00
Total votes		11,264	100

2006 Illinois State House 1st district Democratic primary
Party	Candidate	Votes	%
Democratic	Susana Mendoza (incumbent)	5,049	100.00
Total votes		5,049	100

2006 Illinois State House 1st district election
Party	Candidate	Votes	%
Democratic	Susana Mendoza (incumbent)	8,669	90.88
Republican	Suzanne Ramos	870	9.12
Total votes		9,539	100

2008 Illinois State House 1st district Democratic primary
Party	Candidate	Votes	%
Democratic	Susana Mendoza (incumbent)	7,219	100.00
Total votes		7,219	100

2008 Illinois State House 1st district election
Party	Candidate	Votes	%
Democratic	Susana Mendoza (incumbent)	12,132	100.00
Total votes		12,132	100

2010 Illinois State House 1st district Democratic primary
Party	Candidate	Votes	%
Democratic	Susana Mendoza (incumbent)	4,226	100.00
Total votes		4,226	100

2010 Illinois State House 1st district election
Party	Candidate	Votes	%
Democratic	Susana Mendoza (incumbent)	7,210	100.00
Total votes		7,210	100

2011 Chicago City Clerk election
Party	Candidate	Votes	%
nonpartisan election	Susana Mendoza	324,742	59.83
nonpartisan election	Patricia Horton	217,993	40.17
write-in	George Sims	5	0.00
Total votes		542,740	100

2015 Chicago City Clerk election
Party	Candidate	Votes	%
nonpartisan election	Susana Mendoza (incumbent)	392,099	99.98
write-in	Marc Loveless	68	0.02
Total votes		392,167	100

2016 Illinois Comptroller special election Democratic primary
Party	Candidate	Votes	%
Democratic	Susana Mendoza	1,626,175	100.00
Total votes		1,626,175	100

2016 Illinois Comptroller special election
Party	Candidate	Votes	%
Democratic	Susana Mendoza	2,676,244	49.45
Republican	Leslie Geissler Munger (incumbent)	2,404,723	44.43
Libertarian	Claire Ball	187,017	3.46
Green	Tim Curtin	144,559	2.59
Total votes		5,412,543	100

2018 Illinois Comptroller Democratic primary
Party	Candidate	Votes	%
Democratic	Susana A. Mendoza (incumbent)	1,147,095	100.00
Total votes		1,147,095	100

2018 Illinois Comptroller election
Party	Candidate	Votes	%
Democratic	Susana A. Mendoza (incumbent)	2,716,853	59.90
Republican	Darlene Senger	1,678,346	37.00
Libertarian	Claire Ball	140,543	3.10
Write-In	Mary Arline Vann-Metcalf	17	0.00
Total votes		4,535,759	100

2019 Chicago mayoral election
Candidate	General Election		Run-off Election	
Candidate	Votes	%	Votes	%
Lori Lightfoot	97,667	17.54	386,039	73.70
Toni Preckwinkle	89,343	16.04	137,765	26.30
William Daley	82,294	14.78		
Willie Wilson	59,072	10.61		
Susana Mendoza	50,373	9.05		
Amara Enyia	44,589	8.00		
Jerry Joyce	40,099	7.20		
Gery Chico	34,521	6.20		
Paul Vallas	30,236	5.43		
Garry McCarthy	14,784	2.66		
La Shawn K. Ford	5,606	1.01		
Robert "Bob" Fioretti	4,302	0.77		
John Kolzar	2,349	0.42		
Neal Sales-Griffin	1,523	0.27		
Write-ins	86	0.02		
Total	556,844	100	523,804	100

2022 Illinois Comptroller Democratic primary
Party	Candidate	Votes	%
Democratic	Susana Mendoza (incumbent)	838,155	100.0%
Total votes		838,155	100.0%

2022 Illinois Comptroller election
Party	Candidate	Votes	%	±%
Democratic	Susana Mendoza (incumbent)	2,331,714	57.08%	−2.82%
Republican	Shannon Teresi	1,676,637	41.04%	+4.04%
Libertarian	Deirdre McCloskey	76,808	1.88%	−1.22%
Write-in		25	0.0%	±0.0%
Total votes		4,085,184	100.0%	
Democratic hold				

Political offices
Preceded by Miguel del Valle	City Clerk of Chicago; 2011–2016	Succeeded by Anna M. Valencia
Preceded by Leslie Munger	Comptroller of Illinois; 2016–present	Incumbent
Party political offices
Preceded by Sheila Simon	Democratic nominee for Comptroller of Illinois; 2016, 2018, 2022	Succeeded by Margaret Croke
