= Senator Wallace =

Senator Wallace may refer to:

== Members of the Northern Irish Senate ==
- Martin Kelso Wallace (1898–1978), Northern Irish Senator from 1961 to 1963

== Members of the United States Senate ==
- William A. Wallace (1827–1896), U.S. Senator from Pennsylvania from 1875 to 1881

== United States state senate members ==
- Bruce A. Wallace (1905–1977), New Jersey State Senate
- David Wallace (Arkansas politician) (fl. 2010s–present), Arkansas State Senate
- G. Frank Wallace (1887–1964), New York State Senate
- George Wallace (Georgia politician), Georgia State Senate
- John M. Wallace (1893–1989), Utah State Senate
- Katie Wallace (fl. 2020s), Colorado State Senate
- Lew Wallace (1827–1905), Indiana State Senate
- Lew Wallace (Oregon politician) (1889–1960), Oregon State Senate
- William A. Wallace (Illinois politician) (1867–?), Illinois State Senate
- William Robert Wallace (1886–1960), Oklahoma State Senate
