= William E. King =

American politician (1885–1967)

Member of the Illinois Senate from the 1st district
- In office 1934–1939
- Preceded by: William Wallace
- Succeeded by: William Wallace

Personal details
- Born: May 12, 1885 Oak Ridge, Morehouse Parish, Louisiana, U.S.
- Died: October 1, 1967 (aged 81) Chicago, Illinois, U.S.
- Party: Republican
- Spouse: Blanche Hastings
- Education: Howard University
- Alma mater: Philander Smith College, John Marshall School of Law
- Occupation: Lawyer, politician

William E. King (May 12, 1885 – October 1, 1967) was an American lawyer and politician in Illinois. He served as a state legislator in the Illinois House of Representatives for eight years, followed by a full term as a state senator. He represented Illinois's 1st House of Representatives district.

== Early life and education ==
He was born in 1885 in Oak Ridge, Morehouse Parish, Louisiana. His parents were Selina and John King. As a child, King attended the Coleman Academy (also Coleman College) in Gibsland, Louisiana.

King earned his undergraduate degree at Philander-Smith College in Little Rock, Arkansas. He studied law at Howard University followed by John Marshall School of Law, where he graduated in 1915. His mentor was Oscar Stanton De Priest.

== Career and life ==
Williams was admitted to the bar in 1916. In June 1919, married Blanche Hastings. The following year, 1920, the couple had a daughter, Blanche As a lawyer, he worked from 1919 until 1923 for the City of Chicago as assistant counsel to their corporation department. He spent two years as the assistant Illinois Attorney General from 1923 until 1925.

A member of the Republican Party, he was elected to the Illinois House of Representatives in 1925. He would serve in the House for eight years representing the 1st district. During his tenure in the House, King led successful efforts to make the Ku Klux Klan illegal in Illinois. He also served on a committee that studied the impact of the Chicago race riot of 1919.

He defeated William A. Wallace for Illinois State Senate in 1934. In the 1938 general election, King lost in a rematch to Wallace with 19,775 votes to Wallace's 20,2721 votes.

After he lost his Senate campaign, he was industrial commissioner for the State of Illinois, followed by two years as an attorney for a waste management district. In 1944, he unsuccessfully ran for United States Congress. He was a delegate for three Republican presidential conventions.

King and Blanche lived on the South Side of Chicago. They raised their niece alongside their daughter, Blanche.

== Later life and legacy ==
King served as deacon for fifteen years at the Olivet Baptist Church. He was a member of the Elks and the Appomattox Club. He was also a freemason. He served on the board of directors for the Wabash YMCA. In the late 1960s, he remained active in local Republican party activities. He was vice chair of the Cook County Republican Central Commission and a member of the G.O.P. State Central Committee. He practiced law until his death.

King died in October 1967 at his home in Chicago. Jet and The Chicago Tribune published obituaries about him. His funeral was held at Ebenezer Missionary Baptist Church in Chicago.

== See also ==
- List of African-American officeholders (1900–1959)
