= Lance Yednock =

American politician

Member of the Illinois House of Representatives from the 76th district
- In office January 9, 2019 – January 8, 2025
- Preceded by: Jerry Lee Long
- Succeeded by: Murri Briel

Personal details
- Party: Democratic
- Education: Northern Illinois University
- Profession: Operating Engineer

Lance Yednock is a former Democratic member of the Illinois House of Representatives for the 76th district which includes Bureau, LaSalle, DeKalb County, Illinois, Putnam and Livingston counties in north central Illinois. Yednock was sworn in to office on January 9, 2019. Yednock, a business representative with International Union of Operating Engineers Local 150, defeated one term incumbent Jerry Lee Long in the 2018 general election. He has a degree from Northern Illinois University.

As of July 3, 2022, Representative Yednock is a member of the following Illinois House committees:

- Agriculture & Conservation Committee (HAGC)
- Labor & Commerce Committee (HLBR)
- Public Utilities Committee (HPUB)
- Small Cell Subcommittee (HPUB-SCEL)
- Transportation: Vehicles & Safety Committee (HVES)
- (Chairman of) Utilities Subcommittee (HPUB-UTIL)
- Veterans' Affairs Committee (HVET)

== Electoral history ==
Illinois 76th State House District Democratic Primary, 2018
Party	Candidate	Votes	%
Democratic	Lance Yednock	5,407	58.45
Democratic	Jill M. Bernal	3,844	41.55
Total votes		9,251	100.0

Illinois 76th State House District General Election, 2018
Party	Candidate	Votes	%
Democratic	Lance Yednock	21,185	55.06
Republican	Jerry Lee Long (incumbent)	17,293	44.94
Total votes		38,478	100.0
