= Dena M. Carli =

American politician

Dena Carli

Member of the Illinois House of Representatives from the 1st district
- In office May 18, 2011 - January 9, 2013
- Preceded by: Susana Mendoza
- Succeeded by: Daniel J. Burke (redistricted)

Personal details
- Born: Chicago, Illinois
- Party: Democratic
- Spouse: Dennis
- Education: Saint Xavier University
- Profession: Police sergeant

Dena Carli is a former Democratic member of the Illinois House of Representatives. She represented the 1st District from 2011 to 2013. After Susana Mendoza resigned to serve as the Chicago City Clerk, the Democratic Representative District Committee for the 1st Representative District appointed Carli to fill the vacancy. Carli did not run for re-election. Carli serves as a Chicago Police Sergeant.
