= Daniel Swanson =

American politician

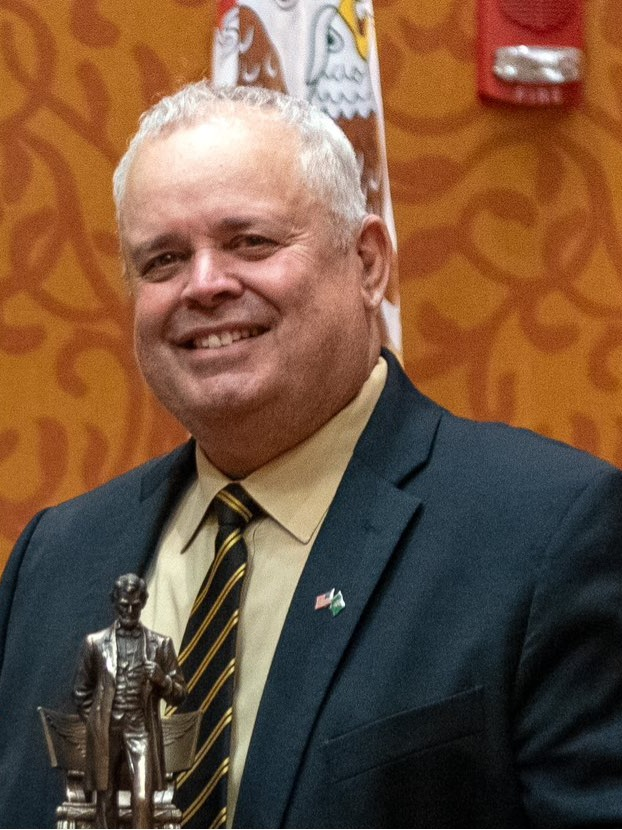
- Swanson in 2025

Member of the Illinois House of Representatives
- Incumbent
- Assumed office January 11, 2017
- Preceded by: Donald L. Moffitt
- Constituency: 71st district (2023-present); 74th district (2017-2023)

Personal details
- Born: July 30, 1959 (age 66) Woodhull, Illinois
- Party: Republican
- Children: Two
- Profession: Farmer

Military service
- Allegiance: United States
- Branch/service: United States Army
- Years of service: 1977-2001, 2007-2008
- Rank: Lieutenant Colonel
- Unit: Illinois Army National Guard

Daniel M. Swanson (born July 30, 1959) is a Republican member of the Illinois House of Representatives, representing the 71st district located in west-central Illinois. Swanson has served in the Illinois House of Representatives since January 11, 2017 and serves as chairman of the Committee on Veterans' Affairs in the 103rd General Assembly.

== Early life and career ==
Daniel M. Swanson was born July 30, 1959 in Woodhull, Illinois. Swanson earned an associate’s degree from Black Hawk College and a bachelor of arts from Western Illinois University. He served in the United States Army, including a deployment as part of Operation Iraqi Freedom, and reached the rank of Lieutenant Colonel. He has also served in the Illinois Army National Guard. He served on the AlWood Community District #225 Board of Education for seventeen years including time as its secretary and was a member of the Henry County Board from 2010 to 2014. At the time he announced his candidacy for the Illinois House of Representatives, he was the superintendent of the Henry County Veterans Commission and a Republican Committeeman for Oxford Township.

== Illinois House of Representatives ==
In 2015, Republican incumbent Donald L. Moffitt announced he would not seek reelection to the Illinois House of Representatives from the 74th district in the 2016 election. In September 2015, Swanson announced his candidacy for the 74th district. The 74th district, at the time, included all or parts of Bureau, Henry County, Illinois, Knox, Lee, and Mercer counties. In the primary, Swanson received the endorsement of former Congressman Bobby Schilling and of the Illinois Federation for Right to Life. He won the three-way primary with 49% of the vote. He then won the general election against Democratic candidate and attorney Bill Butts and was sworn into the 100th Illinois General Assembly on January 11, 2017.

In the 2021 decennial reapportionment, Swanson was drawn into the redrawn 71st district. The district, running from Rock Island County in the north to McDonough County in the south and retained portions of western Henry County and eastern Mercer and Knox counties previously in the 74th district, while adding portions of Warren County. While the new 71st district was far friendlier to Democratic candidates than the previous 74th district, Swanson won reelection in 2022 with 62.14% of the vote to his opponent’s 37.86% of the vote, as similar margin as his previous victories.

In 2022, House Minority Leader Jim Durkin appointed Swanson to the Commission on Equitable Public University Funding, the Military Economic Development Committee, the State Procurement Task Force. At the beginning of the 103rd Illinois General Assembly, in a rare committee appointment that crossed party lines, Speaker Chris Welch (D-Westchester) chose Swanson to serve as the chairman of the House Committee on Veterans’ Affairs.

=== Electoral history ===
2018 Illinois House of Representatives election, 74th District
Party	Candidate	Votes	%
Republican	Daniel Swanson (incumbent)	36,925	100.0
Total votes		36,925	100.0
Republican hold			

2020 Illinois House of Representatives election, 74th District
Party	Candidate	Votes	%
Republican	Dan Swanson (incumbent)	39,239	70.97
Democratic	Christopher Demink	16,054	29.03
Total votes		55,293	100.0
Republican hold			

2022 Illinois House of Representatives election, 71st District
Party	Candidate	Votes	%
Republican	Dan Swanson	23,070	62.14
Democratic	Christopher Demink	14,058	37.86
Total votes		37,128	100.0
Republican hold			

2024 Illinois House of Representatives election, 71st District
Party	Candidate	Votes	%
Republican	Daniel Swanson (incumbent)	37,528	100.00
Republican hold			
