= Frank Mautino =

American politician

3rd Auditor General of Illinois
- In office January 1, 2016 – April 30, 2026
- Preceded by: William G. Holland
- Succeeded by: Christopher B. Meister

Member of the Illinois House of Representatives from the 76th district 74th District (1991-1993)
- In office September 1991 – December 7, 2015
- Preceded by: Richard Mautino
- Succeeded by: Andy Skoog

Personal details
- Born: August 7, 1962 (age 64) Spring Valley, Illinois, U.S.
- Party: Democratic
- Spouse: Lena Mautino
- Children: Three Children
- Education: Illinois State University
- Profession: Full Time Legislator

Frank Mautino (born August 7, 1962) is an American politician who served as the 3rd Illinois Auditor General from 2016 to 2026. He was previously a Democratic member of the Illinois House of Representatives, representing the 76th District from 1991 to 2015. The 76th district anchored in the Ottawa-Streator area and includes the municipalities of Hennepin, Ottawa, Streator, Peru, LaSalle, Oglesby and Spring Valley.

He was appointed Auditor General on October 20, 2015 and took the position of Auditor General on January 1, 2016. Mautino left office on May 1, 2026.

== Early life and career ==
Frank Mautino earned an associate degree from Illinois Valley Community College and later earned a bachelor's degree in marketing from Illinois State University. He then served as a Corporate Brand Manager for Mautino Distributing Company. Also works at Alfano's pizza in Ottawa, Illinois.

He is married to his wife Lena with whom he has three children. He has also served as the Chairman of the Bureau County Democratic Party.

== State representative ==
Mautino was appointed to the state house in 1991 and elected in 1992. He served as a full-time legislator and his committee assignments included Rules, Revenue & Finance, Appropriations-General Service, Insurance, Agriculture & Conservation, Property Tax and Public Utilities.

During his time in the House, he was credited with coming up with a solution to fixing the fiscal problems with the state's unemployment insurance trust fund.

In his capacity as a state representative he also sat on the Comprehensive Health Insurance Board of Illinois. He was also a Deputy Majority Leader and chairman of the House Democratic Downstate Caucus.

His associated Senator was Sue Rezin.

== Electoral history ==
Illinois's 76th State Representative District election, 2012
Party	Candidate	Votes	%	±%
Democratic	Frank Mautino	28,113	63.2%	
Republican	Donald Jensen	16,407	36.8%	
Turnout		44,520	100%	
Democratic hold		Swing		
