= Illinois Auditor General =

Elected official

Auditor General of Illinois
- Seal of Illinois
- Incumbent; Christopher B. Meister since May 1, 2026
- Term length: 10 years, no term limits
- Salary: $180,600 (2022)
- Website: www.auditor.illinois.gov

The Illinois Auditor General is a legislative officer provided for by the Constitution of Illinois and appointed by the Illinois General Assembly for a 10-year term. The office reviews all Illinois state spending for legality.

== History ==
A 1956 scandal prompted the creation of the office. Orville E. Hodge, auditor of public accounts, embezzled or misappropriated over $1 million in public funds.

In 1957, the General Assembly passed the Illinois Auditing Act and created the Department of Audits and the Legislative Audit Commission.

In 1970, the Illinois Constitution mandated the office as a legislative entity rather than an executive branch agency. The General Assembly passed the Illinois State Auditing Act.

Robert G. Cronson was the first Auditor General and took office on August 1, 1974.

== Duties ==
The Auditor General audits public funds of the State and reports findings and recommendations to the Illinois General Assembly and to the Governor of Illinois. They disclose the obligation, expenditure, receipt, and use of public funds. The Auditor General's office performs several types of audits to review state agencies, including performance audits and information system audits.

== Officeholders ==
#	Name	Term
1	Robert G. Cronson	1974–1992
2	William Holland	1992–2015
3	Frank J. Mautino	2016–2026
4	Christopher B. Meister	2026–present

== Current occupant ==
Christopher B. Meister became Auditor General of the State of Illinois on May 1, 2026. Prior to his appointment as Auditor General, Meister served as the executive director of the Illinois Finance Authority from 2009 to 2026, and as general council from 2007 to 2009.

== Former occupants ==
Frank J. Mautino became Auditor General of the State of Illinois on January 1, 2016. Prior to his appointment as Auditor General, Mr. Mautino served 24 years in the Illinois House of Representatives, including 12 years as a co-chairman of the Legislative Audit Commission. He was the third Auditor General since the position was created. Mautino did not wish to seek a second term.

== See also ==
- Illinois Auditor of Public Accounts — a pre-1973 elected constitutional office
- Illinois Treasurer
