= Aaron Ortiz =

American politician

Aarón Ortíz

Member of the Illinois House of Representatives from the 1st district
- Incumbent
- Assumed office January 9, 2019
- Preceded by: Daniel J. Burke

Personal details
- Born: Aarón Manuel Ortíz; June 18, 1991 (age 35) Chicago, Illinois, U.S.
- Party: Democratic
- Education: University of Illinois Urbana-Champaign (BA)
- Website: Official website

Aarón Manuel Ortíz (born June 18, 1991) is a Democratic member of the Illinois House of Representatives for the 1st district.

== Early life ==
Prior to his election to the Illinois House of Representatives, Ortíz was a teacher and college counselor at Back of the Yards High School. He is a son of immigrants from Nuevo Ideal, Durango, Mexico. He is a graduate of the University of Illinois at Urbana-Champaign, having earned a BA in Urban Planning in 2013.

== Illinois House of Representatives ==
Ortíz defeated Daniel J. Burke in the 2018 Democratic primary as part of a slate of Latino candidates backed by now Congressman Chuy García, and Senator Bernie Sanders. He was sworn into office January 9, 2019.

On March 17, 2020, Ortiz handily defeated his primary challenger Alicia Martinez, a worker with Brackenbox, Inc., and a former staffer and member of Alderman Edward M. Burke's political organization.

On January 21, 2021, Ortiz was added to House Leadership and was named as a new House Majority Caucus Whip. On February 5, 2021, Ortiz was elected as the House Chair for the Illinois Legislative Latino Caucus.

As of July 2, 2022, Representative Ortíz is a member of the following Illinois House Committees:

- Appropriations - Elementary & Secondary Education (HAPE)
- Appropriations - General Service (HAPG)
- Appropriations - Human Services (HAPH)
- Labor & Commerce (HLBR)
- Medicaid & Managed Care Subcommittee (HAPH-MEDI)
- Mental Health & Addiction (HMEH)
- Transportation Issues Subcommittee (HVES-TVSI)
- Transportation: Vehicles & Safety (HVES)

== Ward Committeeperson ==
On March 18, 2020, the same night of his first re-election, Ortiz defeated 52-year incumbent Edward M. Burke to become the first Latino Ward Committeeperson in Chicago's 14th Ward.

== Electoral history ==
Illinois 1st Representative District Democratic Primary, 2018
Party	Candidate	Votes	%
Democratic	Aaron M. Ortiz	5,636	53.12
Democratic	Daniel J. Burke (incumbent)	4,974	46.88
Total votes		10,610	100.0

Illinois 1st Representative District General Election, 2018
Party	Candidate	Votes	%
Democratic	Aaron M. Ortiz	16,913	100.0
Total votes		16,913	100.0

Illinois 1st Representative District Democratic Primary, 2020
Party	Candidate	Votes	%
Democratic	Aaron M. Ortiz (incumbent)	6,605	57.85
Democratic	Alicia E. Martinez	4,813	42.15
Total votes		11,418	100.0

Chicago Committeeperson of the 14th Ward Democratic Primary, 2020
Party	Candidate	Votes	%
Democratic	Aaron M. Ortiz	2,366	38.65
Democratic	Edward M. Burke (incumbent)	2,150	35.12
Democratic	Alicia Elena Martinez	1,606	26.23
Total votes		6,122	100.0

Illinois 1st Representative District General Election, 2020
Party	Candidate	Votes	%
Democratic	Aaron M. Ortiz (incumbent)	21,204	100.0
Total votes		21,204	100.0

Illinois 1st Representative District General Election, 2022
Party	Candidate	Votes	%
Democratic	Aaron M. Ortiz (incumbent)	11,611	100.0
Total votes		11,611	100.0
