= Julie Hamos =

American politician (born 1949)

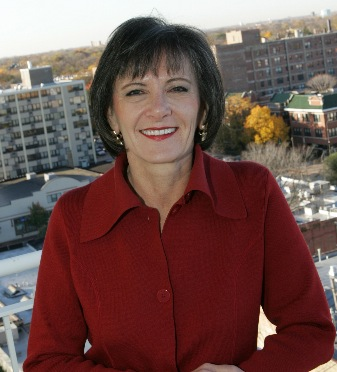

Member of the Illinois House of Representatives from the 18th district
- In office December 31, 1998 – April 2010
- Preceded by: Jan Schakowsky
- Succeeded by: Robyn Gabel

Personal details
- Born: January 29, 1949 (age 77) Budapest, Hungary
- Party: Democratic
- Spouse: Alan J. Greiman
- Education: Washington University (BA); George Washington University (JD)
- Profession: Attorney

Julie Hamos (born January 29, 1949) is a former Democratic member of the Illinois House of Representatives, representing the 18th District from 1999 to 2010. Her district included Rogers Park in Chicago and the suburbs of Evanston, Wilmette, Kenilworth, Winnetka and Glencoe.

== Early life ==
Born in Budapest, Hungary, the seven-year-old Julie, her brother and parents escaped at the height of the Hungarian Revolution in 1956. She grew up in Cleveland, Ohio. After receiving her Juris Doctor degree in 1975 from George Washington University, Hamos became the first staff attorney for a newly formed subcommittee of the powerful U.S. House Committee on Ways and Means. Later she became legislative and political action director for the American Federation of State, County and Municipal Employees, working on policy issues affecting working men and women. From 1981 to 1984, Hamos served as legislative counsel and policy advisor to then-State's Attorney Richard M. Daley, advocating for the first-ever laws and policies on domestic violence and sexual assault. She was appointed in 1984 as director of the child support division, with oversight of 300,000 child support cases. In 1988, Hamos founded Julie E. Hamos & Associates, a public policy and community relations consulting firm. Hamos lives in Chicago. Her husband of 33 years, Alan J. Greiman, a retired appellate court judge, is deceased.

== Illinois House of Representatives ==
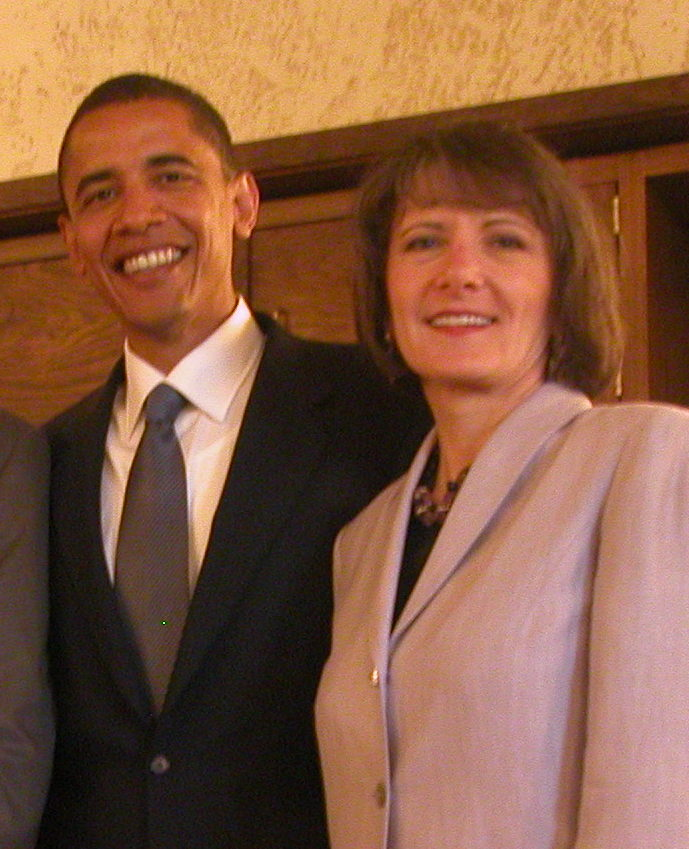
Hamos with then State Senator Barack Obama in July 2004

In 1998, incumbent Jan Schakowsky ran for the United States House of Representatives in Illinois's 9th congressional district. Hamos was elected her successor. She took office December 31, 1998. In June 2004, Hamos was selected as a fellow at the John F. Kennedy School of Government for Senior Executives in State and Local Government.

== Congressional campaign ==
In July 2009, Hamos declared her candidacy for the U.S. House of Representatives in Illinois’ 10th congressional district, but lost to Dan Seals in the Democratic primary in February 2010. In April 2010, she was appointed by Governor Pat Quinn to be the new director of the Illinois Department of Healthcare and Family Services, the agency that oversees the Illinois Medicaid program.

== Illinois Department of Healthcare and Family Services ==
Hamos led the Department of Healthcare and Family Services (HFS) until January 9, 2015, when she resigned before incoming, newly elected governor Bruce Rauner took office. During her tenure at HFS—Illinois' largest state agency—she guided the expansion of managed care in the Illinois Medicaid program, the expansion of coverage under President Barack Obama's health care law and upgraded technology systems. She also implemented child support initiatives "such as working with fathers on parenting, making child support information available on cell phone and intercepting gambling winnings at casinos."
