= West Elsdon, Chicago =

Community area in Chicago, Illinois

West Elsdon
- Community area
- Community Area 62 - West Elsdon
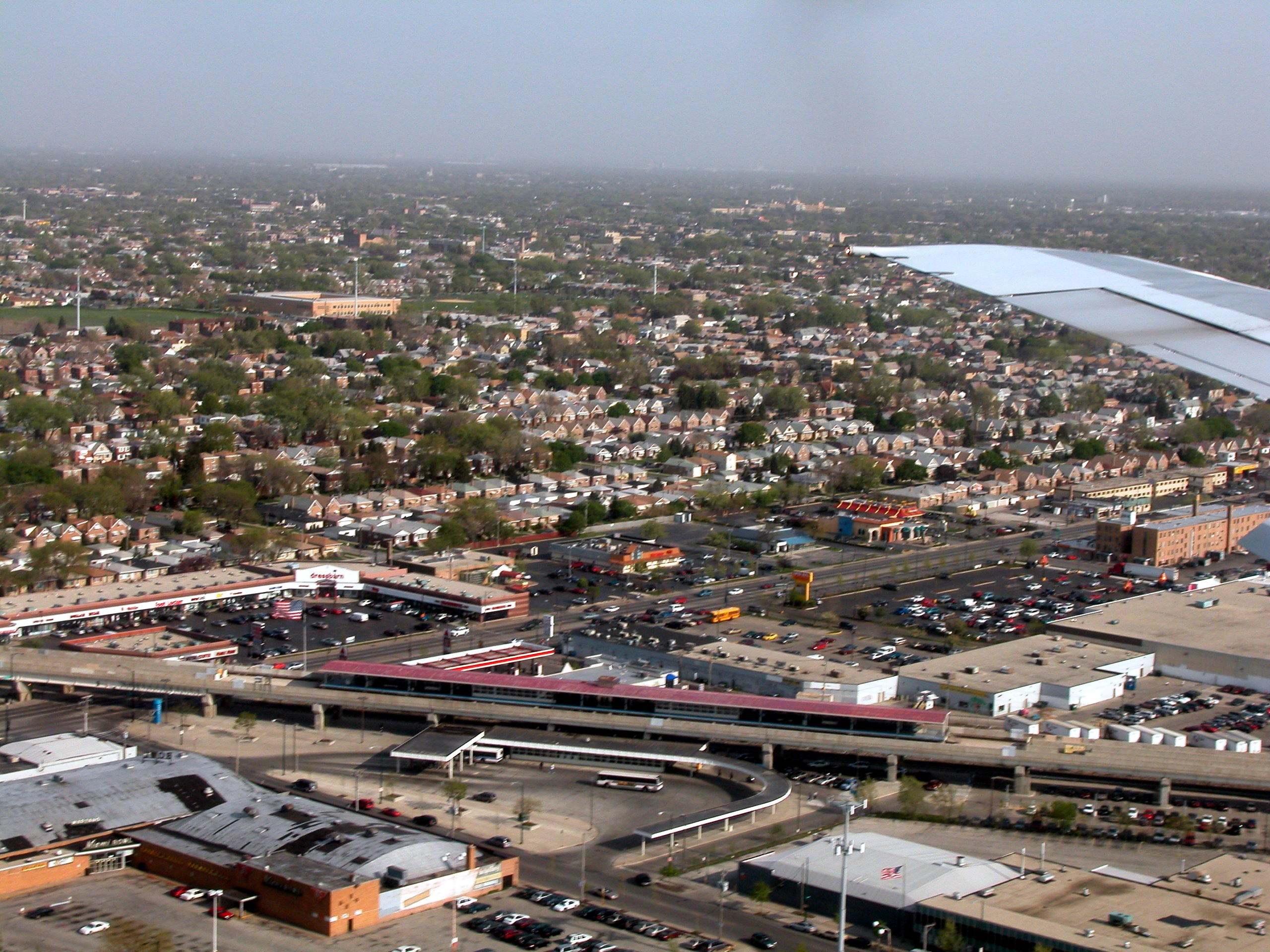
- View looking southeast into West Elsdon neighborhood.

- Location within the city of Chicago
- Coordinates: 41°47.4′N 87°43.2′W
- Country: United States
- State: Illinois
- County: Cook
- City: Chicago
- Neighborhoods: list: West Elsdon

Area
  - Total: 1.18 sq mi (3.06 km^{2})

Population (2024)
  - Total: 17,901
  - Density: 15,200/sq mi (5,850/km^{2})

Demographics 2024
  - White: 13.2%
  - Black: 1.3%
  - Hispanic: 83.1%
  - Asian: 2.3%
  - Other: 0.1%

Educational Attainment 2024
  - High School Diploma or Higher: 76.6%
  - Bachelor's Degree or Higher: 17.7%
- Time zone: UTC-6 (CST)
  - Summer (DST): UTC-5 (CDT)
- ZIP Codes: parts of 60629 and 60632
- Median income: $55,380
- Source: U.S. Census, Record Information Services

West Elsdon, one of the 77 official community areas, is located on the southwest side of the City of Chicago, Illinois. It is noted as a twin neighborhood of West Lawn. It has a population which includes a mix of dwindling Polish-American residents and increasing Mexican-American residents who constitute a clear majority. It has its own association, "West Elsdon Civic Association," which privately organizes the neighborhood. The St. Turibius grade school was a Roman Catholic elementary school located at 57th and Karlov that closed in 2013, though the building remains and is adjacent to St. Turibius Roman Catholic church. The former Lourdes Roman Catholic girls' high school located from 55th to 56th street and Komensky to Karlov Avenue became Chicago Public Schools Sor Juana Elementary School.

== History ==
Historical population
Census	Pop.	Note	%±
1930	2,861		—
1940	3,255		13.8%
1950	7,728		137.4%
1960	14,215		83.9%
1970	14,059		−1.1%
1980	12,797		−9.0%
1990	12,266		−4.1%
2000	15,921		29.8%
2010	18,109		13.7%
2020	18,394		1.6%

Before the early 20th century, the area designated West Elsdon was a marshy remnant of an ancient lake. The early settlers were German-Americans and Irish-Americans. During the 1930s, housing was built and Polish-Americans and other Central Europeans settled the area. The land remained rural until World War II, when growth resumed and brick houses were built. After World War II, West Elsdon was the site of the Airport Homes race riots, the worst episode of racial inspired violence that the city faced in some thirty years. The West Elsdon Civic Association became one of the first vocal political enemies of the CHA and its first executive secretary, Elizabeth Wood. Opposition to public housing remained strong in the area. In the early 1970s the West Elsdon Civic Association was an active participant in the "No-CHA" citywide coalition opposing scattered-site public housing in predominantly middle-class white neighborhoods.

Later, Mexican-Americans settled in the eastern part of the community. Soon public schools were registering more Hispanic-Americans, and the CTA Orange Line was built to connect Midway Airport to Downtown.

== Politics ==
The West Elsdon community has supported the Democratic Party in the past two presidential elections by large margins. In the 2016 presidential election, West Elsdon cast 3,910 votes for Hillary Clinton and cast 685 votes for Donald Trump (82.18% to 14.40%). In the 2012 presidential election, West Elsdon cast 3,015 votes for Barack Obama and cast 736 votes for Mitt Romney (79.45% to 19.39%).

== Notable people ==
- Anne M. Burke, Illinois Supreme Court Justice and wife of Alderman Ed Burke.
- Daniel J. Burke, Democratic member of the Illinois House of Representatives since 1991. He is a West Elsdon resident and alderman Ed Burke's brother.
- Ed Burke, longtime 14th ward alderman representing West Elsdon and the surrounding area on the Chicago City Council. He is the husband of Justice Anne Burke.
- Jenny McCarthy, actress, Playboy model and anti-vaccine activist. She was raised in West Elsdon.
- Joanne McCarthy, professional athlete who played for the Chicago Condors of the American Basketball League during the 1998 season. Jenny McCarthy's sister, she was also raised in West Elsdon.
