= Murri Briel =

Illinois politician

Amy "Murri" Briel

Member of the Illinois House of Representatives from the 76th district
- Incumbent
- Assumed office January 8, 2025
- Preceded by: Lance Yednock

Personal details
- Party: Democratic

Amy "Murri" Briel is a Democratic Party politician from Illinois, having been elected to Illinois House of Representatives for the 76th Representative District.

Briel was elected to the Illinois House in 2024, defeating Republican Liz Bishop, and succeeding Democrat Lance Yednock, for whom she was chief of staff.

Briel ran for Illinois' 16th congressional district in 2018 but was defeated in that year's primary by Sara Dady, who was herself defeated in the general election by Republican Adam Kinzinger.

Briel was born in LaSalle County, Illinois, attended Ottawa Township High School, and as of 2025, lives near Ottawa, Illinois. Briel identifies as "proudly neurodivergent."
