= Maurino, Ivanovo Oblast =

Maurino Маурино
- Village
- Location within Ivanovo Oblast Location within Russia
- Coordinates: 56°54′N 39°47′E
- Country: Russia
- Region: Ivanovo Oblast
- District: Ilyinsky District
- Time zone: UTC+3:00

Maurino (Russian: Маурино) is a rural locality (a village) in Ilyinsky District, Ivanovo Oblast, Russia. Population: 5 (2010 census);

== Geography ==
This rural locality is located 7 kilometres (4.3 mi) from Ilyinskoye-Khovanskoye (the district's administrative centre), 72 kilometres (45 mi) from Ivanovo (capital of Ivanovo Oblast) and 184 kilometres (114 mi) from Moscow. Derevenki is the nearest rural locality.
