= William A. Wallace (Illinois politician) =

American politician

Member of the Illinois Senate from the 3rd district
- In office 1939–1943
- Preceded by: William E. King
- Succeeded by: Christopher C. Wimbish

Personal details
- Born: June 6, 1867 Maryland, U.S.
- Died: April 6, 1946 (aged 78) Chicago, Illinois
- Party: Democratic
- Education: Lincoln University
- Profession: Politician

William A. Wallace (born June 6, 1867) was an American politician. He served in the Illinois State Senate from 1938 until 1943, representing the Cook 3 district, including Chicago. He was a Democrat.

== Early life and education ==
William A. Wallace was born in Maryland on June 6, 1867. As a child, he moved to Pennsylvania where he was educated in its public schools and ultimately graduated from Lincoln University in Lower Oxford Township, Pennsylvania. Wallace moved to Chicago in 1892.

== Career and life ==
In Chicago, he worked a variety of government jobs during his pre-electoral politics career including; as comparer of titles in county recorder's office; special warrant clerk in County Treasurer's office, deputy clerk of the municipal court, and for the postal service for thirteen years. He also owned a successful bakery at 36th Street and South State Street. He was the involved in the promotion of the Black Star Line and rose through the ranks of the Universal Negro Improvement Association to become its Chicago leader and a top lieutenant of Marcus Garvey. He sold the bakery to focus full time on the UNIA. In 1938, he was elected to the Illinois State Senate after defeating Republican William E. King. In 1939, he was the chair of the committee on reapportionment and was the vice chair of the committee on the civil service.

Wallace died on April 6, 1946.

== See also ==
- List of African-American officeholders (1900–1959)
