= Daniel J. Burke =

American politician

Daniel Burke

Member of the Illinois House of Representatives from the 1st district
- In office January 9, 2013 – December 30, 2018
- Preceded by: Dena M. Carli
- Succeeded by: Aaron Ortiz

Member of the Illinois House of Representatives from the 23rd district
- In office January 9, 1991 – January 9, 2013
- Preceded by: Robert T. Krska
- Succeeded by: Michael J. Zalewski (redistricted)

Personal details
- Born: December 17, 1951 (age 74) Chicago, Illinois, U.S.
- Party: Democratic

Daniel J. Burke (born December 17, 1951) was a Democratic member of the Illinois House of Representatives, representing the 23rd district from 1991 to 2013 and the 1st district from 2013 to 2018. Burke was defeated for the Democratic nomination in 2018 primary by Aaron Ortiz. Burke resigned from the House on December 30, 2018.

Daniel Burke is the brother of Chicago Alderman Ed Burke.

Illinois House of Representatives
Preceded by Robert T. Krska	Member of the Illinois House of Representatives from the 22nd district 1991–1993	Succeeded by Mike Madigan
Preceded by Lovana Jones	Member of the Illinois House of Representatives from the 23rd district 1993–2013	Succeeded by Michael J. Zalewski
Preceded by Dena M. Carli	Member of the Illinois House of Representatives from the 1st district 2013–2019	Succeeded by Aaron Ortiz
