= Anthony Scariano =

American politician (1918–2004)

Judge of the Illinois Appellate Court from the 1st district
- In office 1985–1996
- Preceded by: Maurice Perlin
- Succeeded by: Leslie South

Personal details
- Born: January 12, 1918 Chicago, Illinois
- Died: April 17, 2004 (aged 86) Chicago, Illinois
- Party: Democratic
- Spouse: Leah (née Vaira)
- Children: Three
- Education: Georgetown University
- Profession: Lawyer; Judge; Politician

Anthony G. Scariano (January 12, 1918 – April 17, 2004) was an American judge, politician, and lawyer.

== Early life ==
Born in Chicago, Illinois, Scariano went to Lane Tech High School and graduated from Wells High School. Scariano received his bachelor's degree from Georgetown University and his law degree from Georgetown University Law Center. While in law school, he served on the staffs of James M. Slattery and Scott W. Lucas. Scariano was admitted to the Illinois bar in 1949. He served as an intelligence office in the Office of Strategic Services during World War II. From 1949 to 1954, Scariano worked as an assistant United States District Attorney.

== Legislative career ==
From 1957 to 1973, Scariano served in the Illinois House of Representatives and was a Democrat. Along with Abner Mikva, Paul Simon, Robert E. Mann, and Dawn Clark Netsch, Scariano helped form a group of liberal, anti-machine Democrats in the House known as the "Kosher Nostra". In 1972, Scariano as an unsuccessful candidate for the Illinois Senate, losing to Republican candidate and fellow state representative Don Moore. From 1973 to 1984, Scariano served on the Illinois Racing Board.

== Judicial career ==
Scariano was appointed to a vacancy on the Illinois Appellate Court created by the resignation of Maurice Perlin. Scariano's initial term began October 1, 1985 and ended in December 1986. He was slated by the Cook County Democratic Party for the 1986 primary to serve a full ten-year term. Scariano was victorious in the Democratic primary and defeated Republican candidate Edwin B. Berman in the general election. He served on the bench until 1996 and was succeeded by Leslie South. He was a resident of Park Forest, Illinois for a time.

== Death ==
Scariano died at Northwestern Memorial Hospital in Chicago, Illinois after suffering a stroke.
