= 2012 Illinois House of Representatives election =

- November 6, 2012

All 118 seats in the Illinois House of Representatives 60 seats needed for a majority
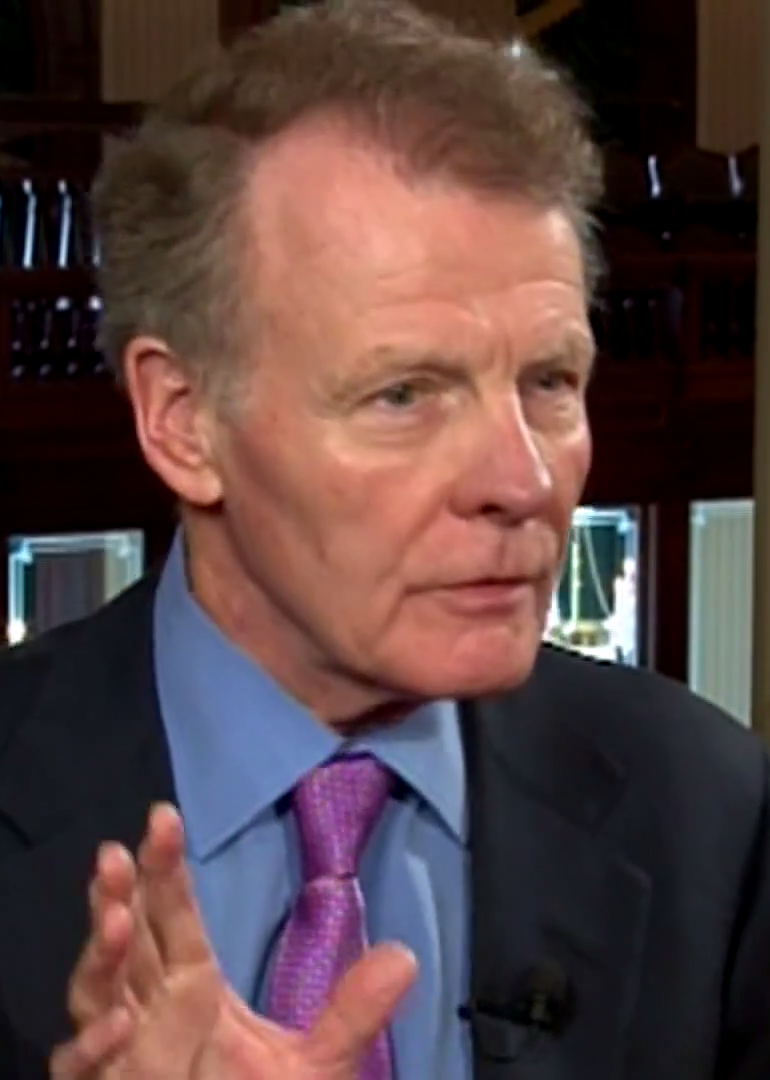

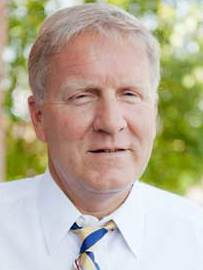
	Majority party	Minority party
Leader	Michael Madigan	Tom Cross
Party	Democratic	Republican
Leader's seat	22nd-Chicago	84th-Oswego
Last election	64	54
Seats won	71	47
Seat change	▲7	▼7
Popular vote	2,294,402	2,137,826
Percentage	51.35%	47.85%
Swing	▲0.73%	▼0.16%
- Democratic gain Republican gain Democratic hold Republican hold 50–60% 60–70% 70–80% 80–90% >90% 50–60% 60–70% >90%
Speaker before election
Michael Madigan
Democratic
Speaker-Elect
Michael Madigan
Democratic

The 2012 Elections for the Illinois House of Representatives was conducted on Tuesday, November 6, 2012. State Representatives are elected for two-year terms, with the entire House of Representatives up for a vote every two years. The votes were as close as to the previous election, but the Democrats were able to win "3/5 of the seats in the House of Representatives (a supermajority in Illinois)".

== Overview ==
Illinois State House Elections, 2010
Party	Votes	Percentage	Candidates	Seats before	Seats after	+/–
Democratic	2,294,402	51.35%	87	64	71	+7
Republican	2,137,826	47.85%	78	54	47	-7
Independent	18,392	0.41%	1	0	0	0
10th District Unity Party	15,007	0.34%	1	0	0	0
Constitution	1,483	0.03%	1	0	0	0
Write-Ins	629	0.01%	12	0	0	0
Totals	4,467,739	100.00%	180	118	118	—

== Predictions ==
Source	Ranking	As of
Governing	Safe D	October 24, 2012
