= Maurino, Podlesnoye Rural Settlement, Vologodsky District, Vologda Oblast =

Maurino Маурино
- Village
- Location within Vologda Oblast Location within Russia
- Coordinates: 59°10′N 39°54′E
- Country: Russia
- Region: Vologda Oblast
- District: Vologodsky District
- Time zone: UTC+3:00

Maurino (Russian: Маурино) is a rural locality (a village) in Podlesnoye Rural Settlement, Vologodsky District, Vologda Oblast, Russia. The population was 3 as of 2002.

== Geography ==
Maurino is located 7 km south of Vologda (the district's administrative centre) by road. Vologda is the nearest locality.
