= Andy Skoog =

American politician

Member of the Illinois House of Representatives from the 76th district
- In office December 16, 2015 – January 11, 2017
- Preceded by: Frank Mautino
- Succeeded by: Jerry Lee Long

Personal details
- Party: Democratic
- Spouse: Holly
- Children: Three sons
- Education: Eastern Illinois University (B.S.)
- Profession: Business Owner

Andy Skoog was a Democratic member of the Illinois House of Representatives representing the 76th district from his appointment in December 2015 to replace Frank Mautino until his loss in the 2016 election to Jerry Lee Long. The 76th district includes Granville, Putnam, Ottawa, LaSalle, Peru, Spring Valley, Oglesby, Streator and Marseilles.

Prior to his tenure in the House, he was the La Salle County Circuit Clerk and before that a member of the North Utica Board of Trustees.
