= Maurino, Mayskoye Rural Settlement, Vologodsky District, Vologda Oblast =

Maurino Маурино
- Village
- Location within Vologda Oblast Location within Russia
- Coordinates: 59°16′N 39°39′E
- Country: Russia
- Region: Vologda Oblast
- District: Vologodsky District
- Time zone: UTC+3:00

Maurino (Russian: Маурино) is a rural locality (a village) in Mayskoye Rural Settlement, Vologodsky District, Vologda Oblast, Russia. The population was 7 as of 2002.

== Geography ==
The distance to Vologda is 34 km, to Maysky is 5 km. Molochnaya is the nearest locality. There are 4 villages in the region of Maurino and Lake Maurinskoye.
