= Donald L. Moffitt =

American politician

Member of the Illinois House of Representatives from the 74th district
- In office 1993 – January 11, 2017
- Preceded by: David Hultgren
- Succeeded by: Daniel Swanson

Personal details
- Born: February 18, 1947 (age 79) Galesburg, Illinois, U.S.
- Party: Republican
- Spouse: Carolyn

Donald L. Moffitt (born February 18, 1947) is a former Republican member of the Illinois House of Representatives, representing the 94th District from 1993 to 2003 and the 74th district from 2003 until 2017.

== Biography ==
Donald L. Moffitt was born February 18, 1947 in Galesburg, Illinois. He is a graduate of the University of Illinois.

Moffitt served as an alderman and mayor of Oneida, Illinois. He moved from Oneida to Knoxville in 1976. He was elected alderman from the 1st ward in Knoxville the next year. Moffitt also previously served as Knox County Treasurer from 1984 to 1993, Knox County Board Chairman from 1982 to 1984, and a Knox County Board member 1978 to 1982.

He was elected to the Illinois House of Representatives in 1992 and took office in January 1993. In a committee appointment that crossed party lines, Speaker Michael J. Madigan made him chairman of the House Committee on Fire Protection in 2010.

In 2015, Moffitt announced he would not run for reelection in the 2016 election. He was succeeded by fellow Republican Dan Swanson, the superintendent of the Henry County Veterans Commission. On January 24, 2017, Governor Bruce Rauner nominated Moffitt to become the assistant director for the Illinois Department of Agriculture. However, the appointment was withdrawn on July 4, 2017.

In 2012, the City of Galesburg renamed an overpass the Donald L. Moffitt Overpass in his honor.
