= Maurino, Sheksninsky District, Vologda Oblast =

Maurino Маурино
- Village
- Location within Vologda Oblast Location within Russia
- Coordinates: 59°08′N 38°18′E
- Country: Russia
- Region: Vologda Oblast
- District: Sheksninsky District
- Time zone: UTC+3:00

Maurino (Russian: Маурино) is a rural locality (a village) in Zheleznodorozhnoye Rural Settlement, Sheksninsky District, Vologda Oblast, Russia. The population was 4 as of 2002.

== Geography ==
Maurino is located 19 km southwest of Sheksna (the district's administrative centre) by road. Yedoma is the nearest locality. There are 3 villages in the region of Maurino and Lake Maurinsko on the same parallel.
