= Jerry Lee Long =

American politician

Member of the Illinois House of Representatives from the 76th district
- In office January 11, 2017 – January 9, 2019
- Preceded by: Andy Skoog
- Succeeded by: Lance Yednock

Personal details
- Party: Republican

Jerry Lee Long is a former Republican member of the Illinois House of Representatives, representing the 76th district which includes Bureau, LaSalle, Putnam and Livingston counties in north central Illinois from 2017 to 2019.

In the 2018 general election, Long was defeated for a second term by Democratic candidate Lance Yednock, a business representative with International Union of Operating Engineers Local 150.
