= 2014 Illinois House of Representatives election =

- November 4, 2014

All 118 seats in the Illinois House of Representatives 60 seats needed for a majority
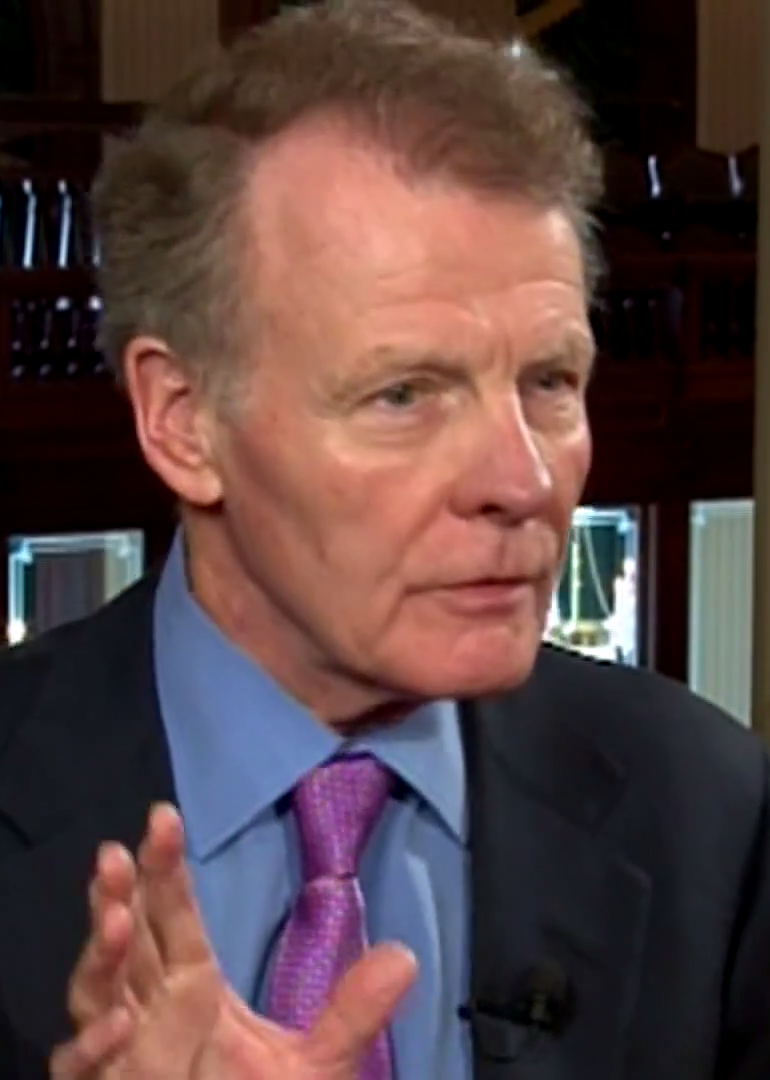

	Majority party	Minority party
Leader	Michael Madigan	Jim Durkin
Party	Democratic	Republican
Leader's seat	22nd-Chicago	82nd-Westchester
Last election	71	47
Seats won	71	47
Seat change	Steady	Steady
Popular vote	1,603,932	1,566,984
Percentage	50.49%	49.33%
Swing	▼0.86%	▲1.48%
- Democratic hold Republican hold 50–60% 60–70% 70–80% 80–90% >90% 50–60% 60–70% 70–80% 80–90% >90%
Speaker before election
Michael Madigan
Democratic
Speaker-Elect
Michael Madigan
Democratic

The 2014 Illinois House of Representatives Elections were conducted on Tuesday, November 4, 2014. State Representatives are elected for two-year terms, with the entire House of Representatives elected every two years. Despite a small swing against the Democrats, there was no net seat change between the two major parties after this election. The Democrats maintained their three-fifths super-majority.

== Overview ==
Illinois State House Elections, 2010
Party	Votes	Percentage	% Change	Candidates	Seats before	Seats after	+/–
Democratic	1,603,932	50.49%	-0.86%	90	71	71	+/-0
Republican	1,566,984	49.33%	+1.48%	75	47	47	+/-0
Independent	5,611	0.18%	-0.23%	1	0	0	0
Write-Ins	2,309	0.07%	+0.06%	6	0	0	0
Totals	3,176,527	100.00%	—	172	118	118	—

== Predictions ==
Source	Ranking	As of
Governing	Safe D	October 20, 2014
