= Harold A. Katz =

American politician (1921–2012)

Harold Katz
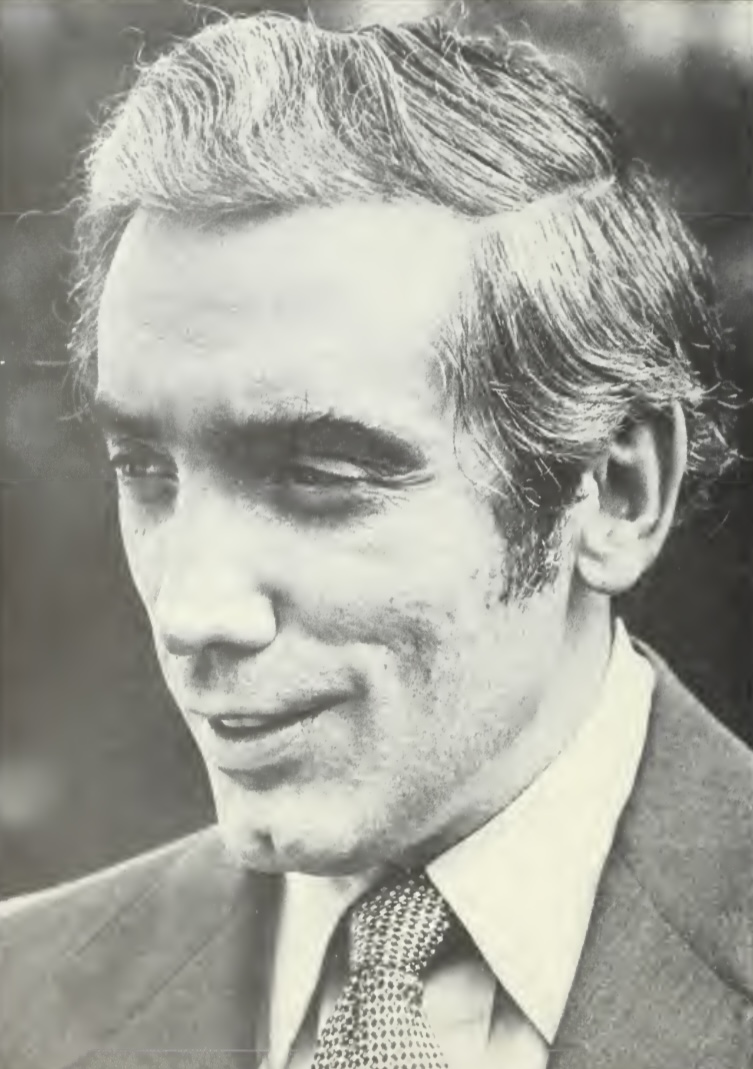

Member of the Illinois House of Representatives
- In office 1965–1983

Personal details
- Born: November 2, 1921 Shelbyville, Tennessee
- Died: December 6, 2012 (aged 91)
- Party: Democratic
- Spouse: Ethel Mae Lewison
- Education: Vanderbilt University; University of Chicago
- Profession: Attorney

Harold A. Katz (November 2, 1921 – December 6, 2012) was an American lawyer and politician from Tennessee. He was elected to the Illinois House of Representatives from 1965 to 1982. For most of his career he was a labor attorney.

== Early life and career ==
Katz was born in Shelbyville, Tennessee. He was Jewish. He received his bachelor's degree in economics in 1943 from Vanderbilt University. He was an early supporter of integration. Katz was not from a wealthy family, having grown up during the Great Depression and he attended Vanderbilt on scholarship. He was a supporter of labor unions.

Katz worked for the National War Labor Board in Chicago, Illinois during World War II. Katz received his J.D. degree in 1948 from the University of Chicago Law School with honors and his master's degree in economics in 1958 from the University of Chicago.

He was a law partner in Katz and Friedman. He served for a time as the Master in Chancery for the Circuit Court of Cook County. Katz served as a special legal advisor to the Illinois Department of Labor and special legal assistant to Governor Otto Kerner Jr. during the 72nd and 73rd sessions of the General Assembly. During his time as a special legal assistant to the Governor, Katz served as a member of the Governor's Advisory Board on Unemployment Compensation. He served as the U.S. Chairman for the International Society for Labor Law and Social Legislation. He was married Ethel Mae Lewison and had four children. Katz was a resident of Glencoe, Illinois.

As a new attorney he wrote a notable comment arguing to expand auto manufacturer liability to safety designs that did not include well-known safety features. His comment was published in Harvard Law Review in 1956.

== Political career ==
Katz served in the Illinois House of Representatives from 1965 to 1982 and was a Democrat. Katz chose to retire rather than run for reelection in the 1982 general election.
