= Lou Lang =

American politician (born 1949)

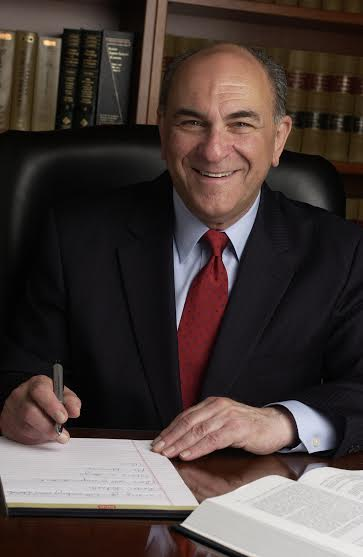

Member of the Illinois House of Representatives from the 16th district
- In office 1987–2019
- Preceded by: Alan J. Greiman
- Succeeded by: Yehiel Mark Kalish

Personal details
- Born: November 26, 1949 (age 76) Chicago, Illinois, U.S.
- Party: Democratic
- Spouse: Heather O'Donnell
- Education: University of Illinois (B.S.); DePaul University (J.D.)
- Profession: Attorney

Louis I. Lang (born November 26, 1949) is an American politician, lobbyist, and former Democratic member of the Illinois House of Representatives, representing the 16th District from 1987 until 2019.

== Personal life and education ==
Lou graduated from the University of Illinois, Urbana Champaign in 1971 with High Honors where he obtained a B.A. in Political Science, before earning a Doctor of Jurisprudence degree with Honors from Depaul University, College of Law in 1974. Born in Chicago in 1949, Lang has been a Skokie resident since the age of five, and is a Niles North High School alumnus. He is a member of the Chicago Bar Association, Illinois State Bar Association, Turning Point's Advisory Council, Asian American Caucus, among many other organizations. Lang is currently Of Counsel to Del Galdo Law Group, LLC. He is the father of five children, and a grandfather to three grandchildren.

== Political career ==
Lang served as attorney for Niles Township for ten years, before being appointed to the Illinois House in 1987 by the Niles Township Democratic Organization to fill the vacancy of Representative Alan J. Greiman. The district at very times included Skokie, Lincolnwood, Morton Grove, and portions of neighboring Chicago. Lang serves as committeeman for Niles Township Democratic Organization, Executive Vice Chairman for the Cook County Democratic Party, and as Secretary of the Democratic Legislative Campaign Committee.

In 1993, Lang advanced to House Democratic Floor Leader, a post he held until 1997 when he assumed the position of Assistant Majority Leader, and in 2009 Lang became Deputy Majority Leader. Lang also served in several other leadership roles, including the Legislative Ethics Committee, and the Joint Committee on Administrative Rules (JCAR).

Lang resigned from the aforementioned leadership posts on May 31, 2018 amid harassment allegations from a longtime activist who accused him of repeated harassment and intimidation. On September 5, 2018 after a thorough investigation, Illinois' Inspector General absolved Lang of all allegations.

He continued to serve as State Representative, and after receiving a partnership offer from prominent lobbying firm Advantage Government Strategies, Lang submitted his resignation as State Representative effective January 7, 2019. Lang remains Committeeman of the Niles Township Democratic Organization, and Executive Vice Chairman of the Cook County Democratic Party.

== Legislation ==
=== Gambling ===
Lang was a strong advocate for legalized gambling. In 2009, he sponsored the Video Gaming Act which legalized the use of video gambling machines in Illinois. A 2019 ProPublica investigation found that Illinois gambling regulators were underfunded and understaffed, and the gambling failed to meet projected revenues for the state's public coffers.

=== Infrastructure ===
In 2009, Lang passed HB38 which was a long sought-after, 6 year, $32 billion construction program that focused on fixing schools, roads, and bridges in Illinois. The program was expected to create 439,000 new jobs by 2015, and would be subsidized through newly legalized gaming machines in bars. Although trouble in implementation occurred following the passage of the bill, after various delays, the program was executed.

=== Social ===
Lang has supported increases in minimum wage, opposed efforts to weaken worker compensation laws, and won a 7% property tax assessment cap for Cook County homeowners. In 2009 Lang co-sponsored Illinois' marriage equality law, and in 2017 he co-sponsored HB40, legislation protecting women's reproductive rights. On May 30, 2018, Illinois succeeded in ratifying the Equal Rights Amendment. After twenty-five years of unsuccessful attempts at ratification, Lang, House Chief Sponsor of the ERA, was celebrated as Illinois became the 37th state to ratify.

=== Healthcare ===
Lang has championed several major bills dealing with mental health and healthcare reform. Lang was Chief Sponsor of HB1, a bill legalizing Medical Cannabis in Illinois. The bill became law in 2013 after it passed both chambers and was signed by then Governor Pat Quinn. As the national opioid crisis increasingly worsened, in 2015, Lang Chief Sponsored the Heroin Crisis Act, a bill used as a national model for battling the Heroin epidemic. In 2017, Lang was the Chief Sponsor of HR378, a resolution elevating awareness for maternal mental health. Lang has also passed several bills dealing with mental health parity, and during the 100th General Assembly, Lang both authored and Chief Sponsored SB1707, dubbed the strongest mental health parity law in the nation.
