= 2008 Illinois House of Representatives election =

- November 4, 2008

All 118 seats in the Illinois House of Representatives 60 seats needed for a majority
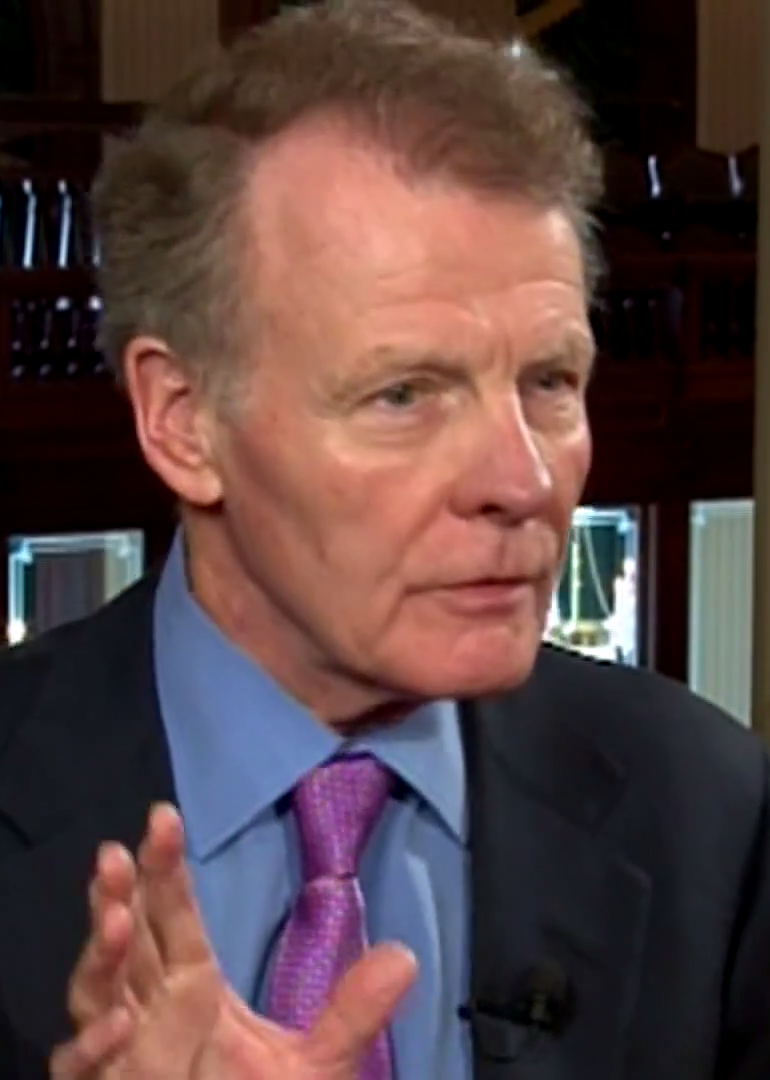

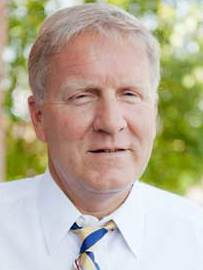
| | Majority party | Minority party |
|---|---|---|
| Leader | Michael Madigan | Tom Cross |
| Party | Democratic | Republican |
| Leader's seat | 22nd-Chicago | 97th-Oswego |
| Last election | 66 | 52 |
| Seats before | 67 | 51 |
| Seats won | 70 | 48 |
| Seat change | ▲3 | ▼3 |
| Popular vote | 2,785,589 | 1,949,123 |
| Percentage | 58.03% | 40.60% |
| Swing | ▲5% | ▼5.25% |
- Democratic gain Republican gain Democratic hold Republican hold 40–50% 50–60% 60–70% 70–80% 80–90% >90% 40–50% 50–60% 60–70% 70–80% >90%
Speaker before election
Michael Madigan
Democratic
Speaker-Elect
Michael Madigan
Democratic

The Illinois House of Representatives elections of 2008 determined the membership of the lower house of the 96th General Assembly. The Democratic Party increased its Majority.

== Overview ==
Illinois State Senate Elections, 2008
| Party | Votes | Percentage | Seats before | Seats after | +/– |
|---|---|---|---|---|---|
| Democratic | 2,785,589 | 58.03% | 67 | 70 | +3 |
| Republican | 1,949,123 | 40.60% | 51 | 48 | -3 |
| Green | 65,647 | 1.30% | 0 | 0 | 0 |
| Independent | 36 | 0.0007% | 0 | 0 | 0 |
| Totals | 4,800,359 | 100.00% | 118 | 0 | 118 |

== Predictions ==
| Source | Ranking | As of |
|---|---|---|
| Stateline | Likely D | October 15, 2008 |

== Sources ==
- Illinois State Board of Elections
