= Maurino, Spasskoye Rural Settlement, Vologodsky District, Vologda Oblast =

Maurino Маурино
- Village
- Location within Vologda Oblast Location within Russia
- Coordinates: 59°03′N 39°41′E
- Country: Russia
- Region: Vologda Oblast
- District: Vologodsky District
- Time zone: UTC+3:00

Maurino (Russian: Маурино) is a rural locality (a village) in Spasskoye Rural Settlement, Vologodsky District, Vologda Oblast, Russia. The population was 2 as of 2002.

== Geography ==
The distance to Vologda is 28 km, to Nepotyagovo is 18 km. Petrovskoye is the nearest rural locality.
