= Jack E. Walker =

American politician and lawyer (1910-1979)

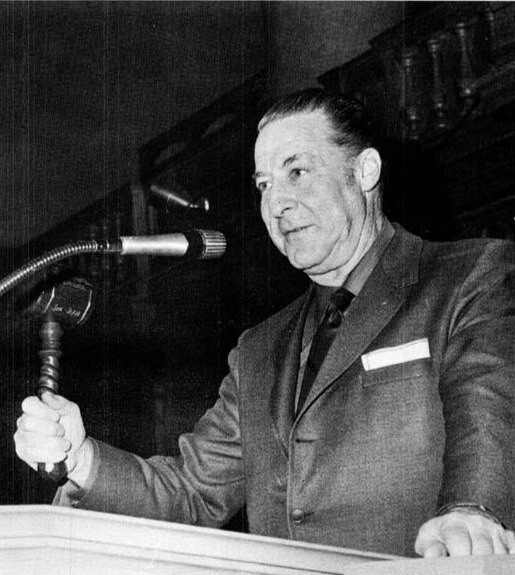
Jack E. Walker presiding over the Illinois House of Representatives (c. 1969-70)

Jack E. Walker (July 15, 1910 – September 21, 1979) was a lawyer and an American Republican politician.

Born in Dahinda, Illinois, he went to University of Illinois, received his bachelor's degree from Knox College, and his law degree from John Marshall Law School. Walker practiced law in Lansing, Illinois and was a Republican. He served in the Illinois House of Representatives from 1957 to 1965 and from 1967 to 1971. He was Speaker of the House in 1969. From 1971 until 1975, Walker then served in the Illinois State Senate until his defeat in 1974.

In 1976, Walker was convicted of bribery in federal court involving a scheme involving the ready-mix concrete business. He went to prison, but was paroled because of his health. Walker died at St, Margaret's Hospital in Hammond, Indiana.
