= 2006 Illinois House of Representatives election =

- November 7, 2006

All 118 seats in the Illinois House of Representatives 60 seats needed for a majority
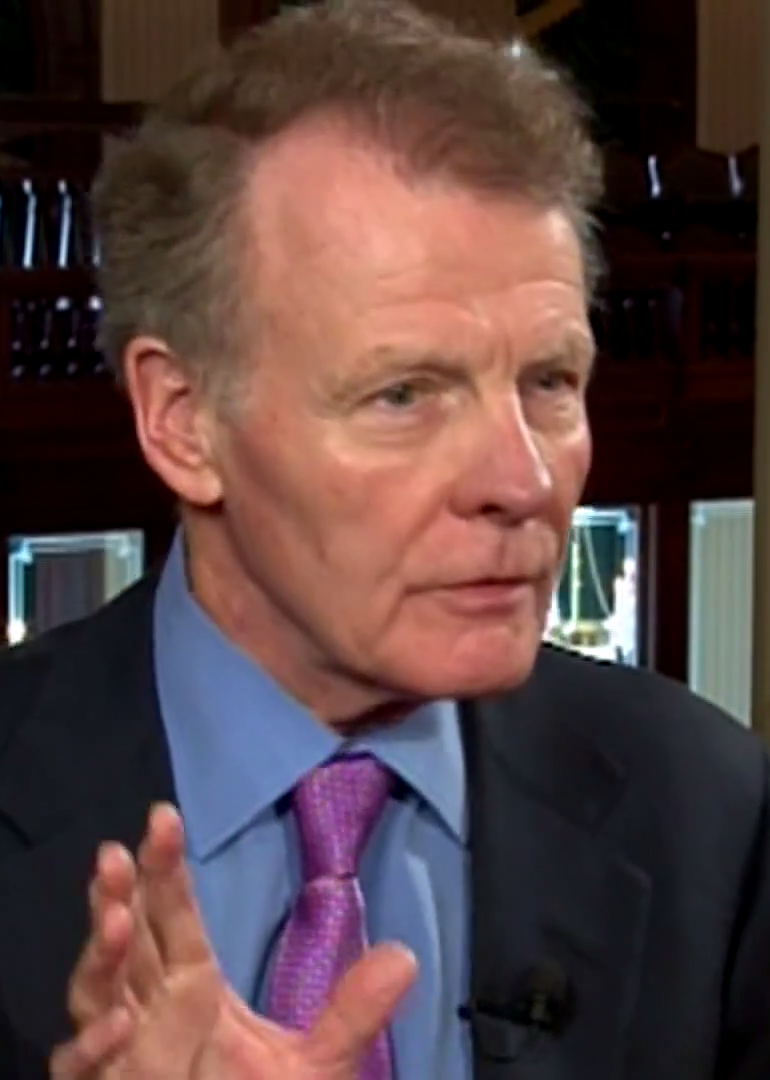

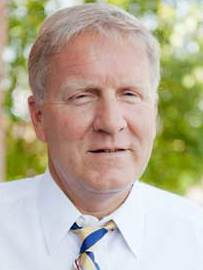
	Majority party	Minority party
Leader	Michael Madigan	Tom Cross
Party	Democratic	Republican
Leader's seat	22nd-Chicago	97th-Oswego
Last election	65	53
Seats won	66	52
Seat change	▲1	▼1
Popular vote	1,701,735	1,454,770
Percentage	53.03%	45.85%
Swing	▲2.32%	▼2.12%
- Democratic gain Democratic hold Republican hold 50–60% 60–70% 70–80% 80–90% >90% 50–60% 60–70% 70–80% >90%
Speaker before election
Michael Madigan
Democratic
Speaker-Elect
Michael Madigan
Democratic

The Illinois House of Representatives elections of 2006 determined the membership of the lower house of the 95th General Assembly. The Democratic Party increased its majority.

== Overview ==
Illinois State House of Representatives Elections, 2006
Party	Votes	Percentage	Seats before	Number of Candidates	Seats after	+/–
Democratic	1,701,735	53.64%	65	91	66	+1
Republican	1,454,770	45.85%	53	84	52	-1
Green	65,647	0.50%	0	4	0	0
Independent	49	0.00%	0	5	0	0
Totals	3,172,566	100.00%	118	184	118	0

== Predictions ==
Source	Ranking	As of
Rothenberg	Safe D	November 4, 2006
