= Robert T. Krska =

American politician

Robert T. Krska (December 28, 1936 – May 20, 2015) was an American politician.

Krska was born in Chicago, Illinois. He went to DePaul University. He worked for the Chicago Street and Sanition Department and was a supervisor. Krska served in the Illinois House of Representatives from 1981 to 1991 and was a Democrat.
