= Maurino Richton =

American politician and lawyer (1909-1995)

Maurino R. Richton

Mayor of Chicago Heights

Member of the Illinois House of Representatives
- In office 1947–1951

Mayor of Chicago Heights
- In office 1963–1967
- In office 1959–1960

Personal details
- Born: August 3, 1909 Chicago Heights, Illinois, U.S.
- Died: April 30, 1995 (aged 85) Chicago Heights, Illinois, U.S.
- Party: Republican
- Education: Northwestern University (BA) • John Marshall Law School (JD) • University of Chicago
- Occupation: Politician, lawyer

Military service
- Branch/service: United States Army
- Years of service: World War II

Maurino R. Richton (August 3, 1909–April 30, 1995) was an American politician and lawyer.

Richton was born in Chicago Heights, Illinois. He graduated from Bloom High School in Chicago Heights, Illinois. Richon received his Bachelor's Degree from Northwestern University in 1933 and his Juris Doctor degree from John Marshall Law School in Chicago, Illinois. He also studied at University of Chicago. Richton served in the United States Army during World War II His training at Camp Ritchie in Maryland makes him one of the Ritchie Boys. He practiced law in Chicago Heights and served as the attorney for the Chicago Heights Elementary School District No. 170. Richton served as the mayor of Chicago Heights from 1947 to 1951 and from 1963 to 1967. He then served in the Illinois House of Representatives in 1959 and 1960. Richton was a Republican. Richton died at his home in Chicago Heights, Illinois.
