= Sonia Silva =

American politician

Sonia Silva (born December 28, 1950) is an American social worker and politician.

Born in Chicago, Illinois, Silva received her bachelor's degree in education from Northeastern Illinois University and her master's degree in public policy and urban planning from the University of Chicago. She was a social worker who helped provide day care for children. From 1997 to 2001, Silva served in the Illinois House of Representatives. Silva was involved with the Democratic Party.
