= Alan J. Greiman =

American politician and judge (1931–2022)

Alan Joel Greiman (December 29, 1931 – February 14, 2022) was an American judge and politician.

Born in Chicago, Illinois, Greiman received his bachelor's and law degrees from University of Illinois. He was admitted to the Illinois bar in 1955 and practiced law in Skokie, Illinois. Greiman served in the Illinois House of Representatives from 1972 to 1987 and was a Democrat. In 1987, Greiman was appointed to the Illinois Circuit Court for Cook County, Illinois. In 1991, Greiman was appointed to the Illinois Appellate Court. Greiman died on February 14, 2022, at the age of 90. He was Jewish.
