= 2024 Illinois House of Representatives election =

- November 5, 2024

All 118 seats in the Illinois House of Representatives 60 seats needed for a majority
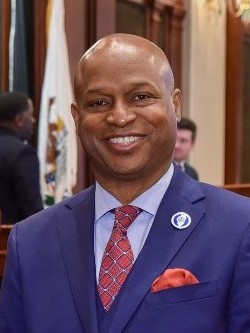

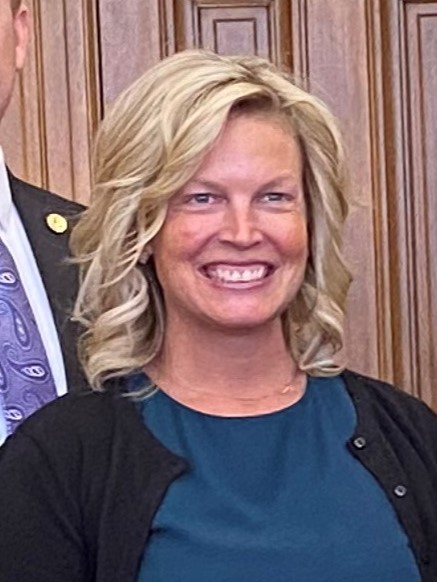
	Majority party	Minority party
Leader	Emanuel "Chris" Welch	Tony McCombie
Party	Democratic	Republican
Leader's seat	7th	89th
Last election	78	40
Seats won	78	40
Seat change	Steady	Steady
Popular vote	2,731,940	2,234,844
Percentage	54.87%	44.87%
- Democratic hold Republican hold 50–60% 60–70% 70–80% 80–90% >90% 50–60% 60–70% 70–80% >90%
Speaker before election
Emanuel "Chris" Welch
Democratic
Elected Speaker
Emanuel "Chris" Welch
Democratic

The 2024 Illinois House of Representatives election was held on November 5, 2024, alongside the 2024 United States elections.

No seats were changed in this election.

== Retirements ==
Six incumbents did not seek re-election.

=== Democrats ===
Four Democrats did not seek re-election.

1. District 32: Cyril Nichols retired.
2. District 36: Kelly M. Burke retired.
3. District 45: Jenn Ladisch Douglass retired.
4. District 76: Lance Yednock retired.

=== Republicans ===
Two Republicans did not seek re-election.

1. District 88: Dan Caulkins retired.
2. District 99: Randy Frese retired.

== Incumbents defeated ==
=== In primaries ===
==== Democrats ====
1. District 31: Mary E. Flowers lost re-nomination to Michael Crawford.

== Predictions ==
Source	Ranking	As of
Sabato's Crystal Ball	Safe D	October 23, 2024

== Results summary ==
The primary filing deadline for established party (Democratic and Republican) candidates was December 4, 2023. New party and independent candidates had until June 24, 2024.

In Illinois, if no Democratic or Republican candidates file for a certain primary election or win the primary as a write-in, the respective party committee can designate a nominee, provided the nominee files petitions within 75 days after the primary. On May 1, 2024, the Illinois General Assembly voted to remove the option.

District	2020 Pres.	Incumbent				Candidates	Result
District	2020 Pres.	Member	Party	First elected	Running	Candidates	Result
1	D +56.1	Aaron Ortiz	Democratic	2019	Yes	▌Aaron Ortiz (Democratic)	Dem Hold
2	D +46.5	Elizabeth Hernandez	Democratic	2007	Yes	▌Elizabeth Hernandez (Democratic); ▌Laura Hruska (Republican)	Dem Hold
3	D +63.2	Eva-Dina Delgado	Democratic	2019	Yes	▌Eva-Dina Delgado (Democratic)	Dem Hold
4	D +72.5	Lilian Jiménez	Democratic	2022	Yes	▌Lilian Jiménez (Democratic)	Dem Hold
5	D +78.1	Kimberly du Buclet	Democratic	2023	Yes	▌Kimberly du Buclet (Democratic); ▌Al Rasho (Republican)	Dem Hold
6	D +74.4	Sonya Harper	Democratic	2015	Yes	▌Sonya Harper (Democratic); ▌Sean A. Dwyer (Republican)	Dem Hold
7	D +59.8	Emanuel Chris Welch	Democratic	2013	Yes	▌Emanuel Chris Welch (Democratic)	Dem Hold
8	D +62.4	La Shawn Ford	Democratic	2007	Yes	▌La Shawn Ford (Democratic)	Dem Hold
9	D +73.3	Yolonda Morris	Democratic	2023	Yes	▌Yolonda Morris (Democratic)	Dem Hold
10	D +76.6	Jawaharial Williams	Democratic	2019	Yes	▌Jawaharial Williams (Democratic)	Dem Hold
11	D +72.7	Ann Williams	Democratic	2011	Yes	▌Ann Williams (Democratic)	Dem Hold
12	D +63.9	Margaret Croke	Democratic	2021	Yes	▌Margaret Croke (Democratic)	Dem Hold
13	D +76.7	Hoan Huynh	Democratic	2023	Yes	▌Hoan Huynh (Democratic)	Dem Hold
14	D +78.4	Kelly Cassidy	Democratic	2011	Yes	▌Kelly Cassidy (Democratic)	Dem Hold
15	D +25.2	Michael Kelly	Democratic	2021	Yes	▌Michael Kelly (Democratic); ▌Mark R. Albers (Republican)	Dem Hold
16	D +35.5	Kevin Olickal	Democratic	2023	Yes	▌Kevin Olickal (Democratic)	Dem Hold
17	D +41.2	Jennifer Gong-Gershowitz	Democratic	2018	Yes	▌Jennifer Gong-Gershowitz (Democratic); ▌Jim Geldermann (Republican)	Dem Hold
18	D +68.8	Robyn Gabel	Democratic	2010	Yes	▌Robyn Gabel (Democratic); ▌Charles Hutchinson (Republican)	Dem Hold
19	D +34.8	Lindsey LaPointe	Democratic	2019	Yes	▌Lindsey LaPointe (Democratic)	Dem Hold
20	R +1.2	Bradley Stephens	Republican	2019	Yes	▌Bradley Stephens (Republican)	Rep Hold
21	D +39.5	Abdelnasser Rashid	Democratic	2023	Yes	▌Abdelnasser Rashid (Democratic)	Dem Hold
22	D +31.0	Angelica Guerrero-Cuellar	Democratic	2021	Yes	▌Angelica Guerrero-Cuellar (Democratic)	Dem Hold
23	D +70.3	Edgar González Jr.	Democratic	2020	Yes	▌Edgar González Jr. (Democratic)	Dem Hold
24	D +59.5	Theresa Mah	Democratic	2017	Yes	▌Theresa Mah (Democratic); ▌Natalian Bolton (Republican)	Dem Hold
25	D +84.8	Curtis Tarver	Democratic	2019	Yes	▌Curtis Tarver (Democratic)	Dem Hold
26	D +73.6	Kam Buckner	Democratic	2019	Yes	▌Kam Buckner (Democratic); ▌Audrey Barrett (Republican)	Dem Hold
27	D +48.5	Justin Slaughter	Democratic	2017	Yes	▌Justin Slaughter (Democratic)	Dem Hold
28	D +47.4	Robert Rita	Democratic	2003	Yes	▌Robert Rita (Democratic)	Dem Hold
29	D +46.3	Thaddeus Jones	Democratic	2011	Yes	▌Thaddeus Jones (Democratic)	Dem Hold
30	D +61.7	Will Davis	Democratic	2003	Yes	▌Will Davis (Democratic); ▌Patricia Bonk (Republican)	Dem Hold
31	D +56.1	Mary E. Flowers	Democratic	1985	Lost renomination	▌Michael Crawford (Democratic)	Dem Hold; New Representative Elected
32	D +69.1	Cyril Nichols	Democratic	2021	No	▌Lisa J. Davis (Democratic)	Dem Hold; New Representative Elected
33	D +73.4	Marcus C. Evans Jr.	Democratic	2012	Yes	▌Marcus C. Evans Jr. (Democratic)	Dem Hold
34	D +62.4	Nicholas Smith	Democratic	2018	Yes	▌Nicholas Smith (Democratic); ▌Frederick L. Walls (Republican)	Dem Hold
35	D +14.8	Mary Gill	Democratic	2023	Yes	▌Mary Gill (Democratic); ▌Herbert Hebein (Republican)	Dem Hold
36	D +16.2	Kelly M. Burke	Democratic	2011	No	▌Rick Ryan (Democratic); ▌Christine Shanahan Mcgovern (Republican)	Dem Hold; New Representative Elected
37	R +15.5	Patrick Sheehan	Republican	2024	Yes	▌Patrick Sheehan (Republican)	Rep Hold
38	D +44.2	Debbie Meyers-Martin	Democratic	2019	Yes	▌Debbie Meyers-Martin (Democratic)	Dem Hold
39	D +69.4	Will Guzzardi	Democratic	2015	Yes	▌Will Guzzardi (Democratic); ▌Anthony Curran (Republican)	Dem Hold
40	D +69.0	Jaime Andrade Jr.	Democratic	2013	Yes	▌Jaime Andrade Jr. (Democratic); ▌Patrycja Karlin (Republican)	Dem Hold
41	D +26.0	Janet Yang Rohr	Democratic	2021	Yes	▌Janet Yang Rohr (Democratic)	Dem Hold
42	D +24.4	Terra Costa Howard	Democratic	2019	Yes	▌Terra Costa Howard (Democratic)	Dem Hold
43	D +33.3	Anna Moeller	Democratic	2014	Yes	▌Anna Moeller (Democratic)	Dem Hold
44	D +28.6	Fred Crespo	Democratic	2007	Yes	▌Fred Crespo (Democratic)	Dem Hold
45	D +16.7	Jenn Ladisch Douglass	Democratic	2023	No	▌Martha "Marti" Deuter (Democratic); ▌Dennis M. Reboletti (Republican)	Dem Hold; New Representative Elected
46	D +21.1	Diane Blair-Sherlock	Democratic	2022	Yes	▌Diane Blair-Sherlock (Democratic); ▌Robert "Rusty" Stevens (Republican)	Dem Hold
47	D +12.3	Amy Grant	Republican	2019	Yes	▌Amy Grant (Republican); ▌Jackie Williamson (Democratic)	Rep Hold
48	D +3.0	Jennifer Sanalitro	Republican	2023	Yes	▌Jennifer Sanalitro (Republican); ▌Maria C. Vesey (Democratic)	Rep Hold
49	D +17.1	Maura Hirschauer	Democratic	2021	Yes	▌Maura Hirschauer (Democratic); ▌Hannah Billingsley (Republican)	Dem Hold
50	D +35.6	Barbara Hernandez	Democratic	2019	Yes	▌Barbara Hernandez (Democratic)	Dem Hold
51	D +13.3	Nabeela Syed	Democratic	2023	Yes	▌Nabeela Syed (Democratic); ▌Tosi Ufodike (Republican)	Dem Hold
52	D +5.8	Martin McLaughlin	Republican	2021	Yes	▌Martin McLaughlin (Republican); ▌Maria Peterson (Democratic)	Rep Hold
53	D +19.8	Nicolle Grasse	Democratic	2019	Yes	▌Nicolle Grasse (Democratic)	Dem Hold
54	D +22.5	Mary Beth Canty	Democratic	2023	Yes	▌Mary Beth Canty (Democratic); ▌Michele Hunter (Republican)	Dem Hold
55	D +16.2	Marty Moylan	Democratic	2013	Yes	▌Marty Moylan (Democratic)	Dem Hold
56	D +20.1	Michelle Mussman	Democratic	2011	Yes	▌Michelle Mussman (Democratic)	Dem Hold
57	D +29.1	Tracy Katz Muhl	Democratic	2024	Yes	▌Tracy Katz Muhl (Democratic)	Dem Hold
58	D +42.6	Bob Morgan	Democratic	2019	Yes	▌Bob Morgan (Democratic); ▌Carl Lambrecht (Republican)	Dem Hold
59	D +33.6	Daniel Didech	Democratic	2019	Yes	▌Daniel Didech (Democratic); ▌Chris Henning (Republican)	Dem Hold
60	D +49.2	Rita Mayfield	Democratic	2010	Yes	▌Rita Mayfield (Democratic)	Dem Hold
61	D +19.7	Joyce Mason	Democratic	2019	Yes	▌Joyce Mason (Democratic); ▌James Creighton Mitchell Jr. (Republican)	Dem Hold
62	D +25.8	Laura Faver Dias	Democratic	2023	Yes	▌Laura Faver Dias (Democratic)	Dem Hold
63	D +2.6	Steve Reick	Republican	2017	Yes	▌Steve Reick (Republican); ▌Mary Mahady (Democratic)	Rep Hold
64	R +11.7	Tom Weber	Republican	2019	Yes	▌Tom Weber (Republican)	Rep Hold
65	D +1.1	Dan Ugaste	Republican	2019	Yes	▌Dan Ugaste (Republican); ▌Linda R Robertson (Democratic)	Rep Hold
66	D +10.8	Suzanne Ness	Democratic	2021	Yes	▌Suzanne Ness (Democratic); ▌Laurie Parman (Republican)	Dem Hold
67	D +16.2	Maurice West	Democratic	2019	Yes	▌Maurice West (Democratic); ▌Glen Oland (Republican)	Dem Hold
68	D +9.9	Dave Vella	Democratic	2021	Yes	▌Dave Vella (Democratic)	Dem Hold
69	R +11.1	Joe Sosnowski	Republican	2011	Yes	▌Joe Sosnowski (Republican); ▌Peter Janko (Democratic)	Rep Hold
70	R +3.4	Jeff Keicher	Republican	2018	Yes	▌Jeff Keicher (Republican); ▌Randi Olson (Democratic)	Rep Hold
71	R +4.7	Daniel Swanson	Republican	2017	Yes	▌Daniel Swanson (Republican)	Rep Hold
72	D +20.9	Gregg Johnson	Democratic	2023	Yes	▌Gregg Johnson (Democratic); ▌Charlie Helmick (Republican)	Dem Hold
73	R +23.0	Ryan Spain	Republican	2017	Yes	▌Ryan Spain (Republican)	Rep Hold
74	R +12.3	Bradley Fritts	Republican	2023	Yes	▌Bradley Fritts (Republican); ▌David Simpson (Democratic)	Rep Hold
75	R +14.0	Jed Davis	Republican	2023	Yes	▌Jed Davis (Republican); ▌Heidi Henry (Democratic)	Rep Hold
76	D +10.0	Lance Yednock	Democratic	2019	No	▌Amy "Murri" Briel (Democratic); ▌Liz Bishop (Republican)	Dem Hold; New Representative Elected
77	D +23.0	Norma Hernandez	Democratic	2023	Yes	▌Norma Hernandez (Democratic); ▌Anthony Airdo (Republican)	Dem Hold
78	D +70.4	Camille Lilly	Democratic	2010	Yes	▌Camille Lilly (Democratic)	Dem Hold
79	D +0.6	Jackie Haas	Republican	2020	Yes	▌Jackie Haas (Republican); ▌William "Billy" Morgan (Democratic)	Rep Hold
80	D +13.5	Anthony DeLuca	Democratic	2009	Yes	▌Anthony DeLuca (Democratic); ▌Adam M. Beaty (Republican)	Dem Hold
81	D +23.3	Anne Stava-Murray	Democratic	2019	Yes	▌Anne Stava-Murray (Democratic); ▌Aaron Porter (Republican)	Dem Hold
82	R +2.1	Nicole La Ha	Republican	2023	Yes	▌Nicole La Ha (Republican); ▌Suzanne Akhras (Democratic)	Rep Hold
83	D +18.5	Matt Hanson	Democratic	2023	Yes	▌Matt Hanson (Democratic)	Dem Hold
84	D +34.0	Stephanie Kifowit	Democratic	2013	Yes	▌Stephanie Kifowit (Democratic)	Dem Hold
85	D +25.2	Dagmara Avelar	Democratic	2021	Yes	▌Dagmara Avelar (Democratic); ▌Chris Metcalfe (Republican)	Dem Hold
86	D +16.8	Lawrence M. Walsh Jr.	Democratic	2012	Yes	▌Lawrence M. Walsh Jr. (Democratic); ▌Jim Lanham (Republican)	Dem Hold
87	R +36.3	Bill Hauter	Republican	2023	Yes	▌Bill Hauter (Republican); ▌David Gill (Independent)	Rep Hold
88	R +20.9	Dan Caulkins	Republican	2019	No	▌Regan Deering (Republican)	Rep Hold; New Representative Elected
89	R +26.6	Tony McCombie	Republican	2017	Yes	▌Tony McCombie (Republican)	Rep Hold
90	R +13.0	John Cabello	Republican	2023	Yes	▌John Cabello (Republican)	Rep Hold
91	D +11.3	Sharon Chung	Democratic	2023	Yes	▌Sharon Chung (Democratic); ▌Desi Anderson (Republican)	Dem Hold
92	D +27.5	Jehan Gordon-Booth	Democratic	2009	Yes	▌Jehan Gordon-Booth (Democratic)	Dem Hold
93	R +23.2	Travis Weaver	Republican	2023	Yes	▌Travis Weaver (Republican)	Rep Hold
94	R +32.6	Norine Hammond	Republican	2010	Yes	▌Norine Hammond (Republican)	Rep Hold
95	R +6.3	Michael Coffey	Republican	2023	Yes	▌Michael Coffey (Republican); ▌Kristen Chiaro (Democratic)	Rep Hold
96	D +18.0	Sue Scherer	Democratic	2013	Yes	▌Sue Scherer (Democratic); ▌Lisa Smith (Republican)	Dem Hold
97	D +9.7	Harry Benton	Democratic	2023	Yes	▌Harry Benton (Democratic); ▌Gabby Shanahan (Republican)	Dem Hold
98	D +25.1	Natalie Manley	Democratic	2013	Yes	▌Natalie Manley (Democratic)	Dem Hold
99	R +38.9	Randy Frese	Republican	2015	No	▌Kyle A. Moore (Republican)	Rep Hold; New Representative Elected
100	R +47.8	C. D. Davidsmeyer	Republican	2012	Yes	▌C. D. Davidsmeyer (Republican)	Rep Hold
101	R +33.3	Chris Miller	Republican	2019	Yes	▌Chris Miller (Republican)	Rep Hold
102	R +53.0	Adam Niemerg	Republican	2021	Yes	▌Adam Niemerg (Republican)	Rep Hold
103	D +56.1	Carol Ammons	Democratic	2015	Yes	▌Carol Ammons (Democratic)	Dem Hold
104	D +1.5	Brandun Schweizer	Republican	2023	Yes	▌Brandun Schweizer (Republican); ▌Jarrett Clem (Democratic)	Rep Hold
105	R +26.3	Dennis Tipsword	Republican	2023	Yes	▌Dennis Tipsword (Republican); ▌Morgan Phillips (Democratic)	Rep Hold
106	R +42.3	Jason Bunting	Republican	2023	Yes	▌Jason Bunting (Republican)	Rep Hold
107	R +51.5	Brad Halbrook	Republican	2017	Yes	▌Brad Halbrook (Republican)	Rep Hold
108	R +35.3	Wayne Rosenthal	Republican	2023	Yes	▌Wayne Rosenthal (Republican)	Rep Hold
109	R +40.2	Charles Meier	Republican	2013	Yes	▌Charles Meier (Republican)	Rep Hold
110	R +54.4	Blaine Wilhour	Republican	2019	Yes	▌Blaine Wilhour (Republican)	Rep Hold
111	R +12.6	Amy Elik	Republican	2021	Yes	▌Amy Elik (Republican); ▌Nick Raftopoulos (Democratic)	Rep Hold
112	D +6.6	Katie Stuart	Democratic	2017	Yes	▌Katie Stuart (Democratic); ▌Jay Keeven (Republican)	Dem Hold
113	D +17.8	Jay Hoffman	Democratic	2013	Yes	▌Jay Hoffman (Democratic)	Dem Hold
114	D +6.6	Kevin Schmidt	Republican	2023	Yes	▌Kevin Schmidt (Republican); ▌LaToya Greenwood (Democratic)	Rep Hold
115	R +42.4	David Friess	Republican	2021	Yes	▌David Friess (Republican)	Rep Hold
116	R +53.8	Dave Severin	Republican	2017	Yes	▌Dave Severin (Republican)	Rep Hold
117	R +52.4	Patrick Windhorst	Republican	2019	Yes	▌Patrick Windhorst (Republican)	Rep Hold
118	R +15.6	Paul Jacobs	Republican	2021	Yes	▌Paul Jacobs (Republican)	Rep Hold

== Detailed results ==
=== District 1 ===
1st District Democratic primary details

Democratic Primary, 1st District
Party	Candidate	Votes	%
Democratic	Aaron Ortiz (incumbent)	5,078	100.00

2024 Illinois House of Representatives election, 1st District
Party	Candidate	Votes	%
Democratic	Aaron Ortiz (incumbent)	18,308	100.00
Democratic hold			

=== District 2 ===
2nd District Democratic primary details

Democratic Primary, 2nd District
Party	Candidate	Votes	%
Democratic	Elizabeth Hernandez (incumbent)	5,633	100.00

2nd District Republican primary details

Republican Primary, 2nd District
Party	Candidate	Votes	%
Republican	Laura Hruska	1,524	100.00

2024 Illinois House of Representatives election, 2nd District
Party	Candidate	Votes	%
Democratic	Elizabeth Hernandez (incumbent)	22,924	72.30
Republican	Laura Hruska	8,782	27.70
Total votes		31,706	100.0
Democratic hold			

=== District 3 ===
3rd District Democratic primary details

Democratic Primary, 3rd District
Party	Candidate	Votes	%
Democratic	Eva-Dina Delgado (incumbent)	7,662	100.00

2024 Illinois House of Representatives election, 3rd District
Party	Candidate	Votes	%
Democratic	Eva-Dina Delgado (incumbent)	28,774	100.00
Democratic hold			

=== District 4 ===
4th District Democratic primary details

Democratic Primary, 4thDistrict
Party	Candidate	Votes	%
Democratic	Lilian Jiménez (incumbent)	7,019	83.26
Democratic	Kirk J. Oritz	1,411	16.74
Total votes		8,430	100.00

2024 Illinois House of Representatives election, 4th District
Party	Candidate	Votes	%
Democratic	Lilian Jiménez (incumbent)	27,277	100.00
Democratic hold			

=== District 5 ===
5th District Democratic primary details

Democratic Primary, 5th District
Party	Candidate	Votes	%
Democratic	Kimberly du Buclet (incumbent)	8,710	75.71
Democratic	Andre Smith	2,794	24.29
Total votes		12,114	100.00

5th District Republican primary details

Republican Primary, 5th District
Party	Candidate	Votes	%
Republican	Al Rasho	610	100.00

2024 Illinois House of Representatives election, 5th District
Party	Candidate	Votes	%
Democratic	Kimberly du Buclet (incumbent)	32,549	86.38
Republican	Al Rasho	5,133	13.62
Total votes		37,682	100.0
Democratic hold			

=== District 6 ===
6th District Democratic primary details

Democratic Primary, 6th District
Party	Candidate	Votes	%
Democratic	Sonya Harper (incumbent)	5,897	73.07
Democratic	Joseph G. Williams	2,173	26.93
Total votes		8,534	100.00

6th District Republican primary details

Republican Primary, 6th District
Party	Candidate	Votes	%
Republican	Sean A. Dwyer	464	100.00

2024 Illinois House of Representatives election, 6th District
Party	Candidate	Votes	%
Democratic	Sonya Harper (incumbent)	21,884	82.33
Republican	Sean A. Dwyer	4,697	17.67
Total votes		26,581	100.0
Democratic hold			

=== District 7 ===
7th District Democratic primary details

Democratic Primary, 7th District
Party	Candidate	Votes	%
Democratic	Emanuel “Chris” Welch (incumbent)	10,375	100.00

2024 Illinois House of Representatives election, 7th District
Party	Candidate	Votes	%
Democratic	Emanuel “Chris” Welch (incumbent)	39,402	100.00
Democratic hold			

=== District 8 ===
8th District Democratic primary details

Democratic Primary, 8th District
Party	Candidate	Votes	%
Democratic	La Shawn Ford (incumbent)	9,769	100.00

2024 Illinois House of Representatives election, 8th District
Party	Candidate	Votes	%
Democratic	La Shawn Ford (incumbent)	29,352	75.20
Republican	Leslie Collazo	9,682	24.80
Total votes		39,034	100.0
Democratic hold			

=== District 9 ===
9th District Democratic primary details

Democratic Primary, 9th District
Party	Candidate	Votes	%
Democratic	Yolonda Morris (incumbent)	7,330	100.00

2024 Illinois House of Representatives election, 9th District
Party	Candidate	Votes	%
Democratic	Yolonda Morris (incumbent)	29,050	100.00
Democratic hold			

=== District 10 ===
10th District Democratic primary details

Democratic Primary, 10th District
Party	Candidate	Votes	%
Democratic	Jawaharial Williams (incumbent)	9,053	100.00

2024 Illinois House of Representatives election, 10th District
Party	Candidate	Votes	%
Democratic	Jawaharial Williams (incumbent)	32,201	100.00
Democratic hold			

=== District 11 ===
11th District Democratic primary details

Democratic Primary, 11th District
Party	Candidate	Votes	%
Democratic	Ann Williams (incumbent)	17,196	100.00

2024 Illinois House of Representatives election, 11th District
Party	Candidate	Votes	%
Democratic	Ann Williams (incumbent)	48,345	100.00
Democratic hold			

=== District 12 ===
12th District Democratic primary details

Democratic Primary, 12th District
Party	Candidate	Votes	%
Democratic	Margaret Croke (incumbent)	14,002	100.00

2024 Illinois House of Representatives election, 12th District
Party	Candidate	Votes	%
Democratic	Margaret Croke (incumbent)	43,586	100.00
Democratic hold			

=== District 13 ===
13th District Democratic primary details

Democratic Primary, 13th District
Party	Candidate	Votes	%
Democratic	Hoan Huynh (incumbent)	18,052	100.00

2024 Illinois House of Representatives election, 13th District
Party	Candidate	Votes	%
Democratic	Hoan Huynh (incumbent)	46,432	87.7
Republican	Terry Nguyen Le	6,510	12.3
Total votes		52,942	100.0
Democratic hold			

=== District 14 ===
14th District Democratic primary details

Democratic Primary, 14th District
Party	Candidate	Votes	%
Democratic	Kelly Cassidy (incumbent)	15,241	100.00

2024 Illinois House of Representatives election, 14th District
Party	Candidate	Votes	%
Democratic	Kelly Cassidy (incumbent)	37,519	100.00
Democratic hold			

=== District 15 ===
15th District Democratic primary details

Democratic Primary, 15th District
Party	Candidate	Votes	%
Democratic	Michael Kelly (incumbent)	10,863	100.00

15th District Republican primary details

Republican Primary, 15th District
Party	Candidate	Votes	%
Republican	Mark R. Albers	2,012	100.00

2024 Illinois House of Representatives election, 15th District
Party	Candidate	Votes	%
Democratic	Michael Kelly (incumbent)	28,177	62.74
Republican	Mark R. Albers	16,734	37.26
Total votes		44,911	100.0
Democratic hold			

=== District 16 ===
16th District Democratic primary details

Democratic Primary, 16th District
Party	Candidate	Votes	%
Democratic	Kevin Olickal (incumbent)	7,399	100.00

2024 Illinois House of Representatives election, 16th District
Party	Candidate	Votes	%
Democratic	Kevin Olickal (incumbent)	26,260	100.00
Democratic hold			

=== District 17 ===
17th District Democratic primary details

Democratic Primary, 17th District
Party	Candidate	Votes	%
Democratic	Jennifer Gong-Gershowitz (incumbent)	11,639	100.00

17th District Republican primary details

Republican Primary, 17th District
Party	Candidate	Votes	%
Republican	Jim Geldermann	1,994	100.00

2024 Illinois House of Representatives election, 17th District
Party	Candidate	Votes	%
Democratic	Jennifer Gong-Gershowitz (incumbent)	37,405	68.65
Republican	Jim Geldermann	17,080	31.35
Total votes		54,485	100.0
Democratic hold			

=== District 18 ===
18th District Democratic primary details

Democratic Primary, 18th District
Party	Candidate	Votes	%
Democratic	Robyn Gabel (incumbent)	13,648	100.00

18th District Republican primary details

Republican Primary, 18th District
Party	Candidate	Votes	%
Republican	Charles Hutchinson	1,315	100.00

2024 Illinois House of Representatives election, 18th District
Party	Candidate	Votes	%
Democratic	Robyn Gabel (incumbent)	40,786	78.97
Republican	Charles Hutchinson	10,859	21.03
Total votes		51,645	100.0
Democratic hold			

=== District 19 ===
19th District Democratic primary details

Democratic Primary, 19th District
Party	Candidate	Votes	%
Democratic	Lindsey Lapointe (incumbent)	11,925	100.00

2024 Illinois House of Representatives election, 20th District
Party	Candidate	Votes	%
Democratic	Lindsey LaPointe (incumbent)	29,738	68.11
Republican	John “JZ” Zimmers	13,924	31.89
Total votes		43,662	100.0
Democratic hold			

=== District 20 ===
20th District Republican primary details

Republican Primary, 20th District
Party	Candidate	Votes	%
Republican	Bradley Stephens (incumbent)	4,495	100.00

2024 Illinois House of Representatives election, 20th District
Party	Candidate	Votes	%
Republican	Bradley Stephens (incumbent)	35,012	100.00
Republican hold			

=== District 21 ===
21st District Democratic primary details

Democratic Primary, 21st District
Party	Candidate	Votes	%
Democratic	Abdelnasser Rashid (incumbent)	4,849	67.24
Democratic	Vidal Vasquez	2,363	32.76
Total votes		7,212	100.00

2024 Illinois House of Representatives election, 21st District
Party	Candidate	Votes	%
Democratic	Abdelnasser Rashid (incumbent)	27,006	100.00
Democratic hold			

=== District 22 ===
22nd District Democratic primary details

Democratic Primary, 22nd District
Party	Candidate	Votes	%
Democratic	Angelica Guerrero-Cuellar (incumbent)	6,599	73.86
Democratic	John Topps	1,326	14.84
Democratic	Joshua P. Hernandez	1,009	11.29
Total votes		8,934	100.00

2024 Illinois House of Representatives election, 22nd District
Party	Candidate	Votes	%
Democratic	Angelica Guerrero-Cuellar (incumbent)	26,887	100.00
Democratic hold			

=== District 23 ===
23rd District Democratic primary details

Democratic Primary, 23rd District
Party	Candidate	Votes	%
Democratic	Edgar Gonzalez Jr. (incumbent)	3,191	79.58
Democratic	Joseph Edward Mercado	819	20.42
Total votes		4,010	100.00

2024 Illinois House of Representatives election, 23rd District
Party	Candidate	Votes	%
Democratic	Edgar Gonzalez Jr. (incumbent)	13,674	100.00
Democratic hold			

=== District 24 ===
24th District Democratic primary details

Democratic Primary, 24th District
Party	Candidate	Votes	%
Democratic	Theresa Mah (incumbent)	6,451	77.26
Democratic	Lai Ching Ng	1,899	22.74
Total votes		8,350	100.00

24th District Republican primary details

Republican Primary, 24th District
Party	Candidate	Votes	%
Republican	Natalian Bolton	751	100.00

2024 Illinois House of Representatives election, 24th District
Party	Candidate	Votes	%
Democratic	Theresa Mah (incumbent)	20,337	78.13
Republican	Nathalian Bolton	5,692	21.87
Total votes		26,029	100.0
Democratic hold			

=== District 25 ===
25th District Democratic primary details

Democratic Primary, 25th District
Party	Candidate	Votes	%
Democratic	Curtis Tarver (incumbent)	11,817	100.00

2024 Illinois House of Representatives election, 25th District
Party	Candidate	Votes	%
Democratic	Curtis Tarver (incumbent)	30,667	100.00
Democratic hold			

=== District 26 ===
26th District Democratic primary details

Democratic Primary, 26th District
Party	Candidate	Votes	%
Democratic	Kam Buckner (incumbent)	10,724	100.00

26th District Republican primary details

Republican Primary, 26th District
Party	Candidate	Votes	%
Republican	Audrey Barrett	1,054	100.00

2024 Illinois House of Representatives election, 26th District
Party	Candidate	Votes	%
Democratic	Kam Buckner (incumbent)	30,735	81.55
Republican	Audrey Barrett	6,952	18.45
Total votes		37,687	100.0
Democratic hold			

=== District 27 ===
27th District Democratic primary details

Democratic Primary, 27th District
Party	Candidate	Votes	%
Democratic	Justin Slaughter (incumbent)	9,577	71.65
Democratic	Tawana “Tj” Robinson	3,790	28.35
Total votes		13,367	100.00

2024 Illinois House of Representatives election, 27th District
Party	Candidate	Votes	%
Democratic	Justin Slaughter (incumbent)	36,640	100.00
Democratic hold			

=== District 28 ===
28th District Democratic primary details

Democratic Primary, 28th District
Party	Candidate	Votes	%
Democratic	Robert Rita (incumbent)	7,935	100.00

2024 Illinois House of Representatives election, 28th District
Party	Candidate	Votes	%
Democratic	Robert Rita (incumbent)	31,942	100.00
Democratic hold			

=== District 29 ===
29th District Democratic primary details

Democratic Primary, 29th District
Party	Candidate	Votes	%
Democratic	Thaddeus Jones (incumbent)	7,332	72.42
Democratic	Gloria K. White	2,792	27.58
Total votes		10,124	100.00

2024 Illinois House of Representatives election, 29th District
Party	Candidate	Votes	%
Democratic	Thaddeus Jones (incumbent)	38,498	99.99
Write-in	Marketa Franklin	17	<0.01
Total votes		38,515	100.0
Democratic hold			

=== District 30 ===
30th District Democratic primary details

Democratic Primary, 30th District
Party	Candidate	Votes	%
Democratic	Will Davis (incumbent)	9,556	100.00

30th District Republican primary details

Republican Primary, 30th District
Party	Candidate	Votes	%
Republican	Patricia Bonk	1,189	100.00

2024 Illinois House of Representatives election, 30th District
Party	Candidate	Votes	%
Democratic	Will Davis (incumbent)	32,481	78.19
Republican	Patricia Bonk	9,058	18.45
Total votes		41,538	100.0
Democratic hold			

=== District 31 ===
31st District Democratic primary details

Democratic Primary, 31st District
Party	Candidate	Votes	%
Democratic	Michael Crawford	7,998	69.10
Democratic	Mary E. Flowers (incumbent)	3,577	30.90
Total votes		11,575	100.00

2024 Illinois House of Representatives election, 31st District
Party	Candidate	Votes	%
Democratic	Michael Crawford	26,588	73.27
Republican	Carl R. Kunz	9,702	26.73
Total votes		36,290	100.0
Democratic hold			

=== District 32 ===
32nd District Democratic primary details

Democratic Primary, 32nd District
Party	Candidate	Votes	%
Democratic	Lisa J. Davis	6,174	100.00

2024 Illinois House of Representatives election, 32nd District
Party	Candidate	Votes	%
Democratic	Lisa J. Davis	23,240	100.00
Democratic hold			

=== District 33 ===
33rd District Democratic primary details

Democratic Primary, 33rd District
Party	Candidate	Votes	%
Democratic	Marcus C. Evans Jr. (incumbent)	11,181	100.00

2024 Illinois House of Representatives election, 33rd District
Party	Candidate	Votes	%
Democratic	Marcus C. Evans Jr. (incumbent)	34,406	100.00
Democratic hold			

=== District 34 ===
34th District Democratic primary details

Democratic Primary, 34th District
Party	Candidate	Votes	%
Democratic	Nicholas Smith (incumbent)	11,045	100.00

34th District Republican primary details

Republican Primary, 34th District
Party	Candidate	Votes	%
Republican	Frederick L. Walls	2,088	100.00

2024 Illinois House of Representatives election, 34th District
Party	Candidate	Votes	%
Democratic	Nicholas Smith (incumbent)	33,043	76.59
Republican	Frederick L. Walls	10,097	23.41
Total votes		43,140	100.0
Democratic hold			

=== District 35 ===
35th District Democratic primary details

Democratic Primary, 35th District
Party	Candidate	Votes	%
Democratic	Mary Gill (incumbent)	13,153	84.38
Democratic	David A. Dewar	2,434	15.62
Total votes		15,587	100.00

35th District Republican primary details

Republican Primary, 35th District
Party	Candidate	Votes	%
Republican	Herbert Hebein	3,657	100.00

2024 Illinois House of Representatives election, 35th District
Party	Candidate	Votes	%
Democratic	Mary Gill (incumbent)	33,275	61.39
Republican	Herbert Hebein	20,451	38.07
Total votes		53,726	100.0
Democratic hold			

=== District 36 ===
36th District Democratic primary details

Democratic Primary, 36th District
Party	Candidate	Votes	%
Democratic	Rick Ryan	6,963	56.95
Democratic	Sonia Anne Khalil	5,263	43.05
Total votes		12,226	100.00

36th District Republican primary details

Republican Primary, 36th District
Party	Candidate	Votes	%
Republican	Christine Shanahan Mcgovern	2,966	100.00

2024 Illinois House of Representatives election, 36th District
Party	Candidate	Votes	%
Democratic	Rick Ryan	27,487	59.21
Republican	Christine Shanahan McGovern	18,938	38.07
Total votes		46,425	100.0
Democratic hold			

=== District 37 ===
37th District Republican primary details

Republican Primary, 37th District
Party	Candidate	Votes	%
Republican	Tim Ozinga (incumbent)	7,719	100.00

Patrick Sheehan was appointed to the seat following the resignation of Tim Ozinga.

2024 Illinois House of Representatives election, 37th District
Party	Candidate	Votes	%
Republican	Patrick Sheehan (incumbent)	47,607	100.00
Republican hold			

=== District 38 ===
38th District Democratic primary details

Democratic Primary, 38th District
Party	Candidate	Votes	%
Democratic	Debbie Meyers-Martin (incumbent)	10,837	100.00

2024 Illinois House of Representatives election, 38th District
Party	Candidate	Votes	%
Democratic	Debbie Meyers-Martin (incumbent)	43,437	100.00
Democratic hold			

=== District 39 ===
39th District Democratic primary details

Democratic Primary, 39th District
Party	Candidate	Votes	%
Democratic	Will Guzzardi (incumbent)	10,583	100.00

39th District Republican primary details

Republican Primary, 39th District
Party	Candidate	Votes	%
Republican	Anthony Curran	927	100.00

2024 Illinois House of Representatives election, 39th District
Party	Candidate	Votes	%
Democratic	Will Guzzardi (incumbent)	29,955	81.12
Republican	Anthony Curran	6,968	18.87
Write-in	Justin Tucker	2	<0.01
Total votes		36,925	100.0
Democratic hold			

=== District 40 ===
40th District Democratic primary details

Democratic Primary, 40th District
Party	Candidate	Votes	%
Democratic	Jaime Andrade Jr. (incumbent)	11,568	100.00

40th District Republican primary details

Republican Primary, 40th District
Party	Candidate	Votes	%
Republican	Patrycja Karlin	969	100.00

2024 Illinois House of Representatives election, 40th District
Party	Candidate	Votes	%
Democratic	Jaime Andrade Jr. (incumbent)	32,189	83.45
Republican	Patrycja Karlin	6,382	16.55
Total votes		38,571	100.0
Democratic hold			

=== District 41 ===
41st District Democratic primary details

Democratic Primary, 41st District
Party	Candidate	Votes	%
Democratic	Janet Yang Rohr (incumbent)	8,324	100.00

2024 Illinois House of Representatives election, 41st District
Party	Candidate	Votes	%
Democratic	Janet Yang Rohr (incumbent)	42,002	100.00
Democratic hold			

=== District 42 ===
42nd District Democratic primary details

Democratic Primary, 42nd District
Party	Candidate	Votes	%
Democratic	Terra Costa Howard (incumbent)	10,562	100.00

2024 Illinois House of Representatives election, 42nd District
Party	Candidate	Votes	%
Democratic	Terra Costa Howard (incumbent)	40,916	99.99
Write-in	Amar Patel	198	<0.01
Total votes		41,114	100.0
Democratic hold			

=== District 43 ===
43rd District Democratic primary details

Democratic Primary, 43rd District
Party	Candidate	Votes	%
Democratic	Anna Moeller (incumbent)	3,149	100.00

2024 Illinois House of Representatives election, 43rd District
Party	Candidate	Votes	%
Democratic	Anna Moeller (incumbent)	18,314	63.93
Republican	Donald P. Puckett	10,332	36.07
Total votes		28,646	100.0
Democratic hold			

=== District 44 ===
44th District Democratic primary details

Democratic Primary, 44th District
Party	Candidate	Votes	%
Democratic	Fred Crespo (incumbent)	4,505	100.00

2024 Illinois House of Representatives election, 44th District
Party	Candidate	Votes	%
Democratic	Fred Crespo (incumbent)	25,918	100.00
Democratic hold			

=== District 45 ===
45th District Democratic primary details

Democratic Primary, 45th District
Party	Candidate	Votes	%
Democratic	Martha “Marti” Deuter	7,641	100.00

45th District Republican primary details

Republican Primary, 45th District
Party	Candidate	Votes	%
Republican	Dennis M. Reboletti	5,040	100.00

2024 Illinois House of Representatives election, 45th District
Party	Candidate	Votes	%
Democratic	Matha “Marti” Deuter	30,306	53.81
Republican	Dennis M. Reboletti	26,013	46.19
Total votes		56,319	100.0
Democratic hold			

=== District 46 ===
46th District Democratic primary details

Democratic Primary, 46th District
Party	Candidate	Votes	%
Democratic	Diane Blair-Sherlock (incumbent)	5,528	100.00

46th District Republican primary details

Republican Primary, 46th District
Party	Candidate	Votes	%
Republican	Robert “Rusty” Stevens	3,667	100.00

2024 Illinois House of Representatives election, 46th District
Party	Candidate	Votes	%
Democratic	Diane Blair-Sherlock (incumbent)	23,488	56.41
Republican	Robert “Rusty” Stevens	18,153	43.59
Total votes		41,641	100.0
Democratic hold			

=== District 47 ===
47th District Democratic primary details

Democratic Primary, 47th District
Party	Candidate	Votes	%
Democratic	Jackie Williamson	7,786	100.00

47th District Republican primary details

Republican Primary, 47th District
Party	Candidate	Votes	%
Republican	Amy Grant (incumbent)	7,377	100.00

2024 Illinois House of Representatives election, 47th District
Party	Candidate	Votes	%
Republican	Amy Grant (incumbent)	29,869	50.25
Democratic	Jackie Williamson	29,577	49.75
Total votes		59,446	100.0
Republican hold			

=== District 48 ===
48th District Democratic primary details

Democratic Primary, 48th District
Party	Candidate	Votes	%
Democratic	Maria C. Vesey	6,045	100.00

48th District Republican primary details

Republican Primary, 48th District
Party	Candidate	Votes	%
Republican	Jennifer Sanalitro (incumbent)	6,035	100.00

2024 Illinois House of Representatives election, 48th District
Party	Candidate	Votes	%
Republican	Jennifer Sanalitro (incumbent)	30,177	57.91
Democratic	Maria C. Vesey	21,931	42.09
Total votes		52,108	100.0
Republican hold			

=== District 49 ===
49th District Democratic primary details

Democratic Primary, 49th District
Party	Candidate	Votes	%
Democratic	Maura Hirschauer (incumbent)	5,023	100.00

49th District Republican primary details

Republican Primary, 49th District
Party	Candidate	Votes	%
Republican	Hannah Billingsley	3,105	74.03
Republican	Aris Garcia	1,089	25.97
Total votes		4,194	100.00

2024 Illinois House of Representatives election, 49th District
Party	Candidate	Votes	%
Democratic	Maura Hirschauer (incumbent)	24,282	54.23
Republican	Hannah Billingsley	20,495	45.77
Total votes		44,777	100.0
Democratic hold			

=== District 50 ===
50th District Democratic primary details

Democratic Primary, 50th District
Party	Candidate	Votes	%
Democratic	Barbara Hernandez (incumbent)	3,863	100.00

2024 Illinois House of Representatives election, 50th District
Party	Candidate	Votes	%
Democratic	Barbara Hernandez (incumbent)	21,233	63.73
Republican	Teresa L. Alexander	12,083	36.27
Total votes		33,316	100.0
Democratic hold			

=== District 51 ===
51st District Democratic primary details

Democratic Primary, 51st District
Party	Candidate	Votes	%
Democratic	Nabeela Syed (incumbent)	6,638	100.00

51st District Republican primary details

Republican Primary, 51st District
Party	Candidate	Votes	%
Republican	Tosi Ufodike	4,073	100.00

2024 Illinois House of Representatives election, 51st District
Party	Candidate	Votes	%
Democratic	Nabeela Syed (incumbent)	32,311	56.18
Republican	Tosi Ufodike	25,203	43.82
Total votes		57,514	100.0
Democratic hold			

=== District 52 ===
52nd District Democratic primary details

Democratic Primary, 52nd District
Party	Candidate	Votes	%
Democratic	Maria Peterson	5,617	100.00

52nd District Republican primary details

Republican Primary, 52nd District
Party	Candidate	Votes	%
Republican	Martin McLaughlin (incumbent)	4,773	100.00

2024 Illinois House of Representatives election, 52nd District
Party	Candidate	Votes	%
Republican	Martin McLaughlin (incumbent)	29,520	50.04
Democratic	Maria Peterson	29,473	49.96
Total votes		58,993	100.0
Republican hold			

=== District 53 ===
53rd District Democratic primary details

Democratic Primary, 53rd District
Party	Candidate	Votes	%
Democratic	Mark L. Walker (incumbent)	6,357	100.00

2024 Illinois House of Representatives election, 53rd District
Party	Candidate	Votes	%
Democratic	Nicolle Grasse (incumbent)	26,324	58.03
Republican	Ronald E. Andermann	19,042	41.97
Total votes		45,366	100.0
Democratic hold			

=== District 54 ===
54th District Democratic primary details

Democratic Primary, 54th District
Party	Candidate	Votes	%
Democratic	Mary Beth Canty (incumbent)	7,702	100.00

54th District Republican primary details

Republican Primary, 54th District
Party	Candidate	Votes	%
Republican	Michele Hunter	3,098	100.00

2024 Illinois House of Representatives election, 54th District
Party	Candidate	Votes	%
Democratic	Mary Beth Canty (incumbent)	28,773	58.96
Republican	Michele Hunter	20,030	41.04
Total votes		48,803	100.0
Democratic hold			

=== District 55 ===
55th District Democratic primary details

Democratic Primary, 55th District
Party	Candidate	Votes	%
Democratic	Marty Moylan (incumbent)	6,534	100.00

2024 Illinois House of Representatives election, 55th District
Party	Candidate	Votes	%
Democratic	Marty Moylan (incumbent)	28,768	100.00
Democratic hold			

=== District 56 ===
56th District Democratic primary details

Democratic Primary, 56th District
Party	Candidate	Votes	%
Democratic	Michelle Mussman (incumbent)	5,588	100.00

2024 Illinois House of Representatives election, 56th District
Party	Candidate	Votes	%
Democratic	Michelle Mussman (incumbent)	28,615	100.00
Democratic hold			

=== District 57 ===
57th District Democratic primary details

Democratic Primary, 57th District
Party	Candidate	Votes	%
Democratic	Tracy Katz Muhl (incumbent)	8,125	100.00

2024 Illinois House of Representatives election, 57th District
Party	Candidate	Votes	%
Democratic	Tracy Katz Muhl (incumbent)	28,812	59.53
Republican	Daniel Behr	19,586	40.47
Total votes		48,398	100.0
Democratic hold			

=== District 58 ===
58th District Democratic primary details

Democratic Primary, 58th District
Party	Candidate	Votes	%
Democratic	Bob Morgan (incumbent)	7,405	100.00

58th District Republican primary details

Republican Primary, 58th District
Party	Candidate	Votes	%
Republican	Carl Lambrecht	2,666	100.00

2024 Illinois House of Representatives election, 58th District
Party	Candidate	Votes	%
Democratic	Bob Morgan (incumbent)	37,111	67.91
Republican	Carl Lambrecht	17,539	32.09
Total votes		54,650	100.0
Democratic hold			

=== District 59 ===
59th District Democratic primary details

Democratic Primary, 59th District
Party	Candidate	Votes	%
Democratic	Daniel Didech (incumbent)	4,844	100.00

59th District Republican primary details

Republican Primary, 59th District
Party	Candidate	Votes	%
Republican	Chris Henning	1,874	100.00

2024 Illinois House of Representatives election, 59th District
Party	Candidate	Votes	%
Democratic	Daniel Didech (incumbent)	26,927	63.59
Republican	Chris Henning	15,421	36.41
Total votes		42,348	100.0
Democratic hold			

=== District 60 ===
60th District Democratic primary details

Democratic Primary, 60th District
Party	Candidate	Votes	%
Democratic	Rita Mayfield (incumbent)	2,949	100.00

2024 Illinois House of Representatives election, 60th District
Party	Candidate	Votes	%
Democratic	Rita Mayfield (incumbent)	21,947	99.99
Write-in	Chris Henning	10	<0.01
Total votes		21,957	100.0
Democratic hold			

=== District 61 ===
61st District Democratic primary details

Democratic Primary, 61st District
Party	Candidate	Votes	%
Democratic	Joyce Mason (incumbent)	4,044	100.00

61st District Republican primary details

Republican Primary, 61st District
Party	Candidate	Votes	%
Republican	James Creighton Mitchell, Jr.	3,050	100.00

2024 Illinois House of Representatives election, 61st District
Party	Candidate	Votes	%
Democratic	Joyce Mason (incumbent)	26,910	58.64
Republican	James Creighton Mitchell, Jr.	18,981	41.36
Total votes		45,891	100.0
Democratic hold			

=== District 62 ===
62nd District Democratic primary details

Democratic Primary, 62nd District
Party	Candidate	Votes	%
Democratic	Laura Faver Dias (incumbent)	4,660	100.00

2024 Illinois House of Representatives election, 62nd District
Party	Candidate	Votes	%
Democratic	Laura Faver Dias (incumbent)	33,440	100.00
Democratic hold			

=== District 63 ===
63rd District Democratic primary details

Democratic Primary, 63rd District
Party	Candidate	Votes	%
Democratic	Mary Mahady	5,818	100.00

63rd District Republican primary details

Republican Primary, 63rd District
Party	Candidate	Votes	%
Republican	Steven Reick (incumbent)	6,236	100.00

2024 Illinois House of Representatives election, 63rd District
Party	Candidate	Votes	%
Republican	Steven Reick (incumbent)	29,711	52.80
Democratic	Mary Mahady	26,565	47.20
Total votes		56,276	100.0
Republican hold			

=== District 64 ===
64th District Republican primary details

Republican Primary, 64th District
Party	Candidate	Votes	%
Republican	Tom Weber (incumbent)	5,306	100.00

2024 Illinois House of Representatives election, 64th District
Party	Candidate	Votes	%
Republican	Tom Weber (incumbent)	45,429	100.00
Republican hold			

=== District 65 ===
65th District Democratic primary details

Democratic Primary, 65th District
Party	Candidate	Votes	%
Democratic	Linda R Robertson	5,205	100.00

65th District Republican primary details

Republican Primary, 65th District
Party	Candidate	Votes	%
Republican	Dan Ugaste (incumbent)	6,952	100.00

2024 Illinois House of Representatives election, 65th District
Party	Candidate	Votes	%
Republican	Dan Ugaste (incumbent)	33,393	55.59
Democratic	Linda R Robertson	26,673	44.41
Total votes		60,066	100.0
Republican hold			

=== District 66 ===
66th District Democratic primary details

Democratic Primary, 66th District
Party	Candidate	Votes	%
Democratic	Suzanne Ness (incumbent)	5,028	100.00

66th District Republican primary details

Republican Primary, 66th District
Party	Candidate	Votes	%
Republican	Laure Parman	4,223	100.00

2024 Illinois House of Representatives election, 66th District
Party	Candidate	Votes	%
Democratic	Suzanne Ness (incumbent)	27,757	53.33
Republican	Laurie Parman	24,292	46. 76
Total votes		52,049	100.0
Democratic hold			

=== District 67 ===
67th District Democratic primary details

Democratic Primary, 67th District
Party	Candidate	Votes	%
Democratic	Maurice West (incumbent)	3,429	100.00

67th District Republican primary details

Republican Primary, 67th District
Party	Candidate	Votes	%
Republican	Glen Oland	2,914	100.00

2024 Illinois House of Representatives election, 67th District
Party	Candidate	Votes	%
Democratic	Maurice West (incumbent)	21,171	59.40
Republican	Glen Oland	14,471	40.60
Total votes		35,642	100.0
Democratic hold			

=== District 68 ===
68th District Democratic primary details

Democratic Primary, 68th District
Party	Candidate	Votes	%
Democratic	Dave Vella (incumbent)	4,228	100.00

68th District Republican primary details

Republican Primary, 68th District
Party	Candidate	Votes	%
Republican	Juan Reyes	48	100.00

2024 Illinois House of Representatives election, 68th District
Party	Candidate	Votes	%
Democratic	Dave Vella (incumbent)	33,688	100.00
Democratic hold			

=== District 69 ===
69th District Democratic primary details

Democratic Primary, 69th District
Party	Candidate	Votes	%
Democratic	Peter Janko	4,020	100.00

69th District Republican primary details

Republican Primary, 69th District
Party	Candidate	Votes	%
Republican	Joe Sosnowski (incumbent)	6,914	100.00

2024 Illinois House of Representatives election, 69th District
Party	Candidate	Votes	%
Republican	Joe Sosnowski (incumbent)	33,658	61.43
Democratic	Peter Janko	21,132	38.57
Total votes		54,790	100.0
Republican hold			

=== District 70 ===
70th District Democratic primary details

Democratic Primary, 70th District
Party	Candidate	Votes	%
Democratic	Randi Olson	4,570	100.00

70th District Republican primary details

Republican Primary, 70th District
Party	Candidate	Votes	%
Republican	Jeff Keicher (incumbent)	6,181	100.00

2024 Illinois House of Representatives election, 70th District
Party	Candidate	Votes	%
Republican	Jeff Keicher (incumbent)	36,380	59.81
Democratic	Randi Olson	24,441	40.19
Total votes		60,821	100.0
Republican hold			

=== District 71 ===
71st District Republican primary details

Republican Primary, 71st District
Party	Candidate	Votes	%
Republican	Daniel Swanson (incumbent)	4,949	100.00

2024 Illinois House of Representatives election, 71st District
Party	Candidate	Votes	%
Republican	Daniel Swanson (incumbent)	37,528	100.00
Republican hold			

=== District 72 ===
72nd District Democratic primary details

Democratic Primary, 72nd District
Party	Candidate	Votes	%
Democratic	Gregg Johnson (incumbent)	4,703	100.00

72nd District Republican primary details

Republican Primary, 72nd District
Party	Candidate	Votes	%
Republican	Charlie Helmick	2,336	100.00

2024 Illinois House of Representatives election, 72nd District
Party	Candidate	Votes	%
Democratic	Gregg Johnson (incumbent)	26,659	60.99
Republican	Charlie Helmick	17,052	39.01
Total votes		43,711	100.0
Democratic hold			

=== District 73 ===
73rd District Republican primary details

Republican Primary, 73rd District
Party	Candidate	Votes	%
Republican	Ryan Spain (incumbent)	9,114	100.00

2024 Illinois House of Representatives election, 73rd District
Party	Candidate	Votes	%
Republican	Ryan Spain (incumbent)	46,067	100.00
Republican hold			

=== District 74 ===
74th District Democratic primary details

Democratic Primary, 74th District
Party	Candidate	Votes	%
Democratic	David Simpson	3,327	100.00

74th District Republican primary details

Republican Primary, 74th District
Party	Candidate	Votes	%
Republican	Bradley Fritts (incumbent)	9,005	100.00

2024 Illinois House of Representatives election, 74th District
Party	Candidate	Votes	%
Republican	Bradley Fritts (incumbent)	31,516	64.83
Democratic	David Simpson	17,101	35.17
Total votes		48,617	100.0
Republican hold			

=== District 75 ===
75th District Democratic primary details

Democratic Primary, 75th District
Party	Candidate	Votes	%
Democratic	Heidi Henry	3,442	100.00

75th District Republican primary details

Republican Primary, 75th District
Party	Candidate	Votes	%
Republican	Jed Davis (incumbent)	7,193	100.00

2024 Illinois House of Representatives election, 75th District
Party	Candidate	Votes	%
Republican	Jed Davis (incumbent)	33,715	61.43
Democratic	Heidi Henry	21,169	38.57
Total votes		54,884	100.0
Republican hold			

=== District 76 ===
76th District Democratic primary details

Democratic Primary, 76th District
Party	Candidate	Votes	%
Democratic	Amy “Murri” Briel	2,393	36.40
Democratic	Cohen Barnes	2,104	32.00
Democratic	Carolyn “Morris” Zaseda	2,078	31.60
Total votes		6,575	100.00

76th District Republican primary details

Republican Primary, 76th District
Party	Candidate	Votes	%
Republican	Liz Bishop	3,187	66.98
Republican	Crystal Loughran	1,571	33.02
Total votes		4,758	100.00

2024 Illinois House of Representatives election, 76th District
Party	Candidate	Votes	%
Democratic	Amy “Murri” Briel	23,931	50.63
Republican	Liz Bishop	23,336	49.37
Total votes		47,267	100.0
Democratic hold			

=== District 77 ===
77th District Democratic primary details

Democratic Primary, 77th District
Party	Candidate	Votes	%
Democratic	Norma Hernandez (incumbent)	3,573	100.00

77th District Republican primary details

Republican Primary, 77th District
Party	Candidate	Votes	%
Republican	Anthony Airdo	1,939	100.00

2024 Illinois House of Representatives election, 77th District
Party	Candidate	Votes	%
Democratic	Norma Hernandez (incumbent)	18,121	58.97
Republican	Anthony Airdo	12,606	41.03
Total votes		30,727	100.0
Democratic hold			

=== District 78 ===
78th District Democratic primary details

Democratic Primary, 78th District
Party	Candidate	Votes	%
Democratic	Camille Lilly (incumbent)	14,448	100.00

2024 Illinois House of Representatives election, 78th District
Party	Candidate	Votes	%
Democratic	Camille Lilly (incumbent)	44,015	100.00
Democratic hold			

=== District 79 ===
79th District Democratic primary details

Democratic Primary, 79th District
Party	Candidate	Votes	%
Democratic	William “Billy” Morgan	2,199	45.72
Democratic	Genevra Walters	1,795	37.32
Democratic	Robert S. Ellington-Snipes	530	11.02
Democratic	Dylan Mill	286	5.95
Total votes		4,810	100.00

79th District Republican primary details

Republican Primary, 79th District
Party	Candidate	Votes	%
Republican	Jackie Haas (incumbent)	4,945	100.00

2024 Illinois House of Representatives election, 79th District
Party	Candidate	Votes	%
Republican	Jackie Haas (incumbent)	25,238	55.43
Democratic	William “Billy” Morgan	20,291	44.57
Total votes		45,529	100.0
Republican hold			

=== District 80 ===
80th District Democratic primary details

Democratic Primary, 80th District
Party	Candidate	Votes	%
Democratic	Anthony Deluca (incumbent)	5,818	100.00

80th District Republican primary details

Republican Primary, 80th District
Party	Candidate	Votes	%
Republican	Adam M. Beaty	3,187	100.00

2024 Illinois House of Representatives election, 80th District
Party	Candidate	Votes	%
Democratic	Anthony Deluca (incumbent)	27,366	59.16
Republican	Adam M. Beaty	18,892	40.84
Total votes		46,258	100.0
Democratic hold			

=== District 81 ===
81st District Democratic primary details

Democratic Primary, 81st District
Party	Candidate	Votes	%
Democratic	Anne Stava-Murray (incumbent)	9,725	100.00

81st District Republican primary details

Republican Primary, 81st District
Party	Candidate	Votes	%
Republican	Aaron Porter	5,406	100.00

2024 Illinois House of Representatives election, 81st District
Party	Candidate	Votes	%
Democratic	Anne Stava-Murray (incumbent)	33,289	56.47
Republican	Aaron Porter	25,661	43.53
Total votes		58,950	100.0
Democratic hold			

=== District 82 ===
82nd District Democratic primary details

Democratic Primary, 82nd District
Party	Candidate	Votes	%
Democratic	Suzanne Akhras	7,288	100.00

82nd District Republican primary details

Republican Primary, 82nd District
Party	Candidate	Votes	%
Republican	Nicole La Ha (incumbent)	5,491	100.00

=== District 83 ===
83rd District Democratic primary details

Democratic Primary, 83rd District
Party	Candidate	Votes	%
Democratic	Matt Hanson (incumbent)	4,078	67.63
Democratic	Arad Boxenbaum	1,952	32.37
Total votes		6,030	100.00

2024 Illinois House of Representatives election, 83rd District
Party	Candidate	Votes	%
Democratic	Matt Hanson (incumbent)	39,062	100.00
Democratic hold			

=== District 84 ===
84th District Democratic primary details

Democratic Primary, 84th District
Party	Candidate	Votes	%
Democratic	Stephanie Kifowit (incumbent)	4,916	100.00

2024 Illinois House of Representatives election, 84th District
Party	Candidate	Votes	%
Democratic	Stephanie Kifowit (incumbent)	34,284	100.00
Democratic hold			

=== District 85 ===
85th District Democratic primary details

Democratic Primary, 85th District
Party	Candidate	Votes	%
Democratic	Dagmara Avelar (incumbent)	5,831	100.00

85th District Republican primary details

Republican Primary, 85th District
Party	Candidate	Votes	%
Republican	Chris Metcalfe	3,882	100.00

2024 Illinois House of Representatives election, 85th District
Party	Candidate	Votes	%
Democratic	Dagmara Avelar (incumbent)	25,360	58.30
Republican	Chris Metcalfe	18,142	41.70
Total votes		43,502	100.0
Democratic hold			

=== District 86 ===
86th District Democratic primary details

Democratic Primary, 86th District
Party	Candidate	Votes	%
Democratic	Lawrence M. Walsh Jr. (incumbent)	4,553	100.00

86th District Republican primary details

Republican Primary, 86th District
Party	Candidate	Votes	%
Republican	Jim Lanham	3,302	100.00

2024 Illinois House of Representatives election, 86th District
Party	Candidate	Votes	%
Democratic	Lawrence M. Walsh Jr. (incumbent)	24,228	59.95
Republican	Jim Lanham	16,189	40.05
Total votes		40,417	100.0
Democratic hold			

=== District 87 ===
87th District Republican primary details

Republican Primary, 87th District
Party	Candidate	Votes	%
Republican	Bill Hauter (incumbent)	9,733	100.00

2024 Illinois House of Representatives election, 87th District
Party	Candidate	Votes	%
Republican	Bill Hauter (incumbent)	39,955	76.72
Independent	David Gill	12,126	23.28
Total votes		52,081	100.0
Republican hold			

=== District 88 ===
88th District Republican primary details

Republican Primary, 88th District
Party	Candidate	Votes	%
Republican	Regan Deering	7,275	68.61
Republican	Chuck Erickson	3,328	31.39
Total votes		10,603	100.00

2024 Illinois House of Representatives election, 88th District
Party	Candidate	Votes	%
Republican	Regan Deering	46,760	100.00
Republican hold			

=== District 89 ===
89th District Republican primary details

Republican Primary, 89th District
Party	Candidate	Votes	%
Republican	Tony McCombie (incumbent)	10,472	100.00

2024 Illinois House of Representatives election, 89th District
Party	Candidate	Votes	%
Republican	Tony McCombie (incumbent)	48,794	100.00
Republican hold			

=== District 90 ===
90th District Republican primary details

Republican Primary, 90th District
Party	Candidate	Votes	%
Republican	John Cabello (incumbent)	6,237	100.00

2024 Illinois House of Representatives election, 90th District
Party	Candidate	Votes	%
Republican	John Cabello (incumbent)	41,383	100.00
Republican hold			

=== District 91 ===
91st District Democratic primary details

Democratic Primary, 91st District
Party	Candidate	Votes	%
Democratic	Sharon Chung (incumbent)	4,151	100.00

91st District Republican primary details

Republican Primary, 91st District
Party	Candidate	Votes	%
Republican	Desi Anderson	4,538	100.00

2024 Illinois House of Representatives election, 91st District
Party	Candidate	Votes	%
Democratic	Sharon Chung (incumbent)	27,601	53.56
Republican	Desi Anderson	23,929	46.44
Total votes		51,530	100.0
Democratic hold			

=== District 92 ===
92nd District Democratic primary details

Democratic Primary, 92nd District
Party	Candidate	Votes	%
Democratic	Jehan Gordon-Booth (incumbent)	5,018	100.00

2024 Illinois House of Representatives election, 92nd District
Party	Candidate	Votes	%
Democratic	Jehan Gordon-Booth (incumbent)	31,370	100.00
Democratic hold			

=== District 93 ===
93rd District Republican primary details

Republican Primary, 93rd District
Party	Candidate	Votes	%
Republican	Travis Weaver (incumbent)	6,018	100.00

2024 Illinois House of Representatives election, 93rd District
Party	Candidate	Votes	%
Republican	Travis Weaver (incumbent)	42,795	100.00
Republican hold			

=== District 94 ===
94th District Republican primary details

Republican Primary, 94th District
Party	Candidate	Votes	%
Republican	Norine Hammond (incumbent)	8,319	100.00

2024 Illinois House of Representatives election, 94th District
Party	Candidate	Votes	%
Republican	Norine Hammond (incumbent)	45,854	100.00
Republican hold			

=== District 95 ===
95th District Democratic primary details

Democratic Primary, 95th District
Party	Candidate	Votes	%
Democratic	Kristen Chiaro	3,988	100.00

95th District Republican primary details

Republican Primary, 95th District
Party	Candidate	Votes	%
Republican	Michael Coffey (incumbent)	5,902	100.00

2024 Illinois House of Representatives election, 95th District
Party	Candidate	Votes	%
Republican	Michael Coffey (incumbent)	34,370	60.07
Democratic	Kristen Chiaro	22,845	39.93
Total votes		57,215	100.0
Republican hold			

=== District 96 ===
96th District Democratic primary details

Democratic Primary, 96th District
Party	Candidate	Votes	%
Democratic	Sue Scherer (incumbent)	3,944	100.00

96th District Republican primary details

Republican Primary, 96th District
Party	Candidate	Votes	%
Republican	Lisa Smith	3,447	100.00

2024 Illinois House of Representatives election, 96th District
Party	Candidate	Votes	%
Democratic	Sue Scherer (incumbent)	22,970	58.41
Republican	Lisa Smith	16,357	41.59
Total votes		39,327	100.0
Democratic hold			

=== District 97 ===
97th District Democratic primary details

Democratic Primary, 97th District
Party	Candidate	Votes	%
Democratic	Harry Benton (incumbent)	4,124	100.00

97th District Republican primary details

Republican Primary, 97th District
Party	Candidate	Votes	%
Republican	Gabby Shanahan	3,772	100.00

2024 Illinois House of Representatives election, 97th District
Party	Candidate	Votes	%
Democratic	Harry Benton (incumbent)	27,540	52.21
Republican	Gabby Shanahan	25,205	47.79
Total votes		52,745	100.0
Democratic hold			

=== District 98 ===
98th District Democratic primary details

Democratic Primary, 98th District
Party	Candidate	Votes	%
Democratic	Natalie Manley (incumbent)	5,303	100.00

2024 Illinois House of Representatives election, 98th District
Party	Candidate	Votes	%
Democratic	Natalie Manley (incumbent)	36,454	100.00
Democratic hold			

=== District 99 ===
99th District Republican primary details

Republican Primary, 99th District
Party	Candidate	Votes	%
Republican	Kyle A. Moore	6,637	73.45
Republican	Eric R. Snellgrove	2,399	26.55
Total votes		9,036	100.00

2024 Illinois House of Representatives election, 99th District
Party	Candidate	Votes	%
Republican	Kyle A. Moore	46,936	100.00
Republican hold			

=== District 100 ===
100th District Republican primary details

Republican Primary, 100th District
Party	Candidate	Votes	%
Republican	C. D. Davidsmeyer (incumbent)	10,587	100.00

2024 Illinois House of Representatives election, 100th District
Party	Candidate	Votes	%
Republican	C. D. Davidsmeyer (incumbent)	50,793	100.00
Republican hold			

=== District 101 ===
101st District Republican primary details

Republican Primary, 101st District
Party	Candidate	Votes	%
Republican	Chris Miller	7,853	100.00

2024 Illinois House of Representatives election, 101st District
Party	Candidate	Votes	%
Republican	Chris Miller (incumbent)	41,090	100.00
Republican hold			

=== District 102 ===
102nd District Republican primary details

Republican Primary, 102nd District
Party	Candidate	Votes	%
Republican	Adam Niemerg (incumbent)	7,682	85.39
Republican	Jim Acklin	1,301	14.46
Republican	Edward “Ed” Blade	13	<0.01
Total votes		8,996	100.00

2024 Illinois House of Representatives election, 102nd District
Party	Candidate	Votes	%
Republican	Adam Niemerg (incumbent)	47,051	100.00
Republican hold			

=== District 103 ===
103rd District Democratic primary details

Democratic Primary, 103rd District
Party	Candidate	Votes	%
Democratic	Carol Ammons (incumbent)	4,762	100.00

2024 Illinois House of Representatives election, 103rd District
Party	Candidate	Votes	%
Democratic	Carol Ammons (incumbent)	32,738	100.00
Democratic hold			

=== District 104 ===
104th District Democratic primary details

Democratic Primary, 104th District
Party	Candidate	Votes	%
Democratic	Brandon Schweizer (incumbent)	4,761	100.00

104th District Republican primary details

Republican Primary, 104th District
Party	Candidate	Votes	%
Republican	Jarrett Clem	4,420	100.00

2024 Illinois House of Representatives election, 104th District
Party	Candidate	Votes	%
Republican	Brandun Schweizer (incumbent)	23,546	50.29
Democratic	Jarrett Clem	23,277	49.71
Total votes		46,823	100.0
Republican hold			

=== District 105 ===
105th District Republican primary details

Republican Primary, 105th District
Party	Candidate	Votes	%
Republican	Dennis Tipsword (incumbent)	7,971	69.71
Republican	Donald Ray Rients	3,464	30.29
Total votes		11,435	100.00

2024 Illinois House of Representatives election, 105th District
Party	Candidate	Votes	%
Republican	Dennis Tipsword (incumbent)	38,132	68.97
Democratic	Morgan Phillips	17,158	31.03
Total votes		55,290	100.0
Republican hold			

=== District 106 ===
106th District Republican primary details

Republican Primary, 106th District
Party	Candidate	Votes	%
Republican	Jason Bunting	11,504	100.00

2024 Illinois House of Representatives election, 106th District
Party	Candidate	Votes	%
Republican	Jason Bunting (incumbent)	45,078	100.00
Republican hold			

=== District 107 ===
107th District Republican primary details

Republican Primary, 107th District
Party	Candidate	Votes	%
Republican	Brad Halbrook (incumbent)	9,613	68.38
Republican	Marsha Webb	4,446	31.62
Total votes		14,059	100.00

2024 Illinois House of Representatives election, 107th District
Party	Candidate	Votes	%
Republican	Brad Halbrook (incumbent)	45,819	100.00
Republican hold			

=== District 108 ===
108th District Republican primary details

Republican Primary, 108th District
Party	Candidate	Votes	%
Republican	Wayne Rosenthal	8,857	100.00

2024 Illinois House of Representatives election, 108th District
Party	Candidate	Votes	%
Republican	Wayne Rosenthal (incumbent)	48,136	100.00
Republican hold			

=== District 109 ===
109th District Republican primary details

Republican Primary, 109th District
Party	Candidate	Votes	%
Republican	Charles Meier	10,051	100.00

2024 Illinois House of Representatives election, 109th District
Party	Candidate	Votes	%
Republican	Charles Meier (incumbent)	51,851	100.00
Republican hold			

=== District 110 ===
110th District Republican primary details

Republican Primary, 110th District
Party	Candidate	Votes	%
Republican	Blaine Wilhour (incumbent)	10,709	78.85
Republican	Matthew T. Hall	2,872	21.15
Total votes		13,581	100.00

2024 Illinois House of Representatives election, 110th District
Party	Candidate	Votes	%
Republican	Blaine Wilhour (incumbent)	43,619	100.00
Republican hold			

=== District 111 ===
111th District Democratic primary details

Democratic Primary, 111th District
Party	Candidate	Votes	%
Democratic	Amy Elik (incumbent)	6,044	100.00

111th District Republican primary details

Republican Primary, 111th District
Party	Candidate	Votes	%
Republican	Nick Raftopoulos	3,159	100.00

2024 Illinois House of Representatives election, 111th District
Party	Candidate	Votes	%
Republican	Amy Elik (incumbent)	29,927	61.52
Democratic	Nick Raftopoulos	18,716	38.48
Total votes		48,643	100.0
Republican hold			

=== District 112 ===
112th District Democratic primary details

Democratic Primary, 112th District
Party	Candidate	Votes	%
Democratic	Katie Stuart (incumbent)	4,659	100.00

2024 Illinois House of Representatives election, 112th District
Party	Candidate	Votes	%
Democratic	Katie Stuart (incumbent)	28,373	54.64
Republican	Jay Keeven	23,555	45.36
Total votes		51,928	100.0
Democratic hold			

=== District 113 ===
113th District Democratic primary details

Democratic Primary, 113th District
Party	Candidate	Votes	%
Democratic	Jay Hoffman (incumbent)	4,498	100.00

113th District Republican primary details

Republican Primary, 113th District
Party	Candidate	Votes	%
Republican	Jamil Mckinney (write-in)	6	100.00

2024 Illinois House of Representatives election, 113th District
Party	Candidate	Votes	%
Democratic	Jay Hoffman (incumbent)	40,037	100.00
Democratic hold			

=== District 114 ===
114th District Democratic primary details

Democratic Primary, 114th District
Party	Candidate	Votes	%
Democratic	LaToya Greenwood	5,716	100.00

114th District Republican primary details

Republican Primary, 114th District
Party	Candidate	Votes	%
Republican	Kevin Schmidt (incumbent)	4,132	100.00

2024 Illinois House of Representatives election, 114th District
Party	Candidate	Votes	%
Republican	Kevin Schmidt (incumbent)	25,057	52.24
Democratic	LaToya Greenwood	22,911	47.76
Total votes		47,968	100.0
Republican hold			

=== District 115 ===
115th District Republican primary details

Republican Primary, 115th District
Party	Candidate	Votes	%
Republican	David Friess	10,976	100.00

2024 Illinois House of Representatives election, 115th District
Party	Candidate	Votes	%
Republican	David Friess (incumbent)	46,910	100.00
Republican hold			

=== District 116 ===
116th District Republican primary details

Republican Primary, 116th District
Party	Candidate	Votes	%
Republican	Dave Severin (incumbent)	11,163	66.99
Republican	Angela Evans	5,501	33.01
Total votes		16,664	100.00

2024 Illinois House of Representatives election, 116th District
Party	Candidate	Votes	%
Republican	Dave Severin (incumbent)	45,378	100.00
Republican hold			

=== District 117 ===
117th District Republican primary details

Republican Primary, 117th District
Party	Candidate	Votes	%
Republican	Patrick Windhorst	15,123	100.00

2024 Illinois House of Representatives election, 117th District
Party	Candidate	Votes	%
Republican	Patrick Windhorst (incumbent)	45,233	100.00
Republican hold			

=== District 118 ===
118th District Republican primary details

Republican Primary, 118th District
Party	Candidate	Votes	%
Republican	Paul Jacobs	8,079	100.00

2024 Illinois House of Representatives election, 118th District
Party	Candidate	Votes	%
Republican	Paul Jacobs (incumbent)	36,564	100.00
Republican hold			

== See also ==
- List of Illinois state legislatures
