= 104th Illinois General Assembly =

Illinois state legislative session from 2025 to 2027

←	103rd	105th	→

Overview
- Legislative body: Illinois General Assembly
- Term: January 8, 2025 – January 13, 2027
- Election: 2024 Senate election

Illinois Senate
- Members: 59
- President: Don Harmon
- President pro tempore: Bill Cunningham
- Majority Leader: Kimberly Lightford
- Party control: Democratic

House of Representatives
- Members: 118
- Speaker: Emanuel Welch
- Speaker pro tempore: Kambium Buckner
- Majority Leader: Robyn Gabel
- Minority Leader: Tony McCombie
- Party control: Democratic

The 104th Illinois General Assembly convened on January 8, 2025, and will adjourn on January 13, 2027.

== Leadership ==
=== Senate Leadership ===
==== Senate Majority (Democratic) Leadership ====
- President: Don Harmon
- President pro tempore: Bill Cunningham
- Majority Leader: Kimberly Lightford
- Assistant Majority Leaders:
  - Mattie Hunter
  - Dave Koehler
  - Linda Holmes
  - Laura Murphy
  - Napoleon Harris
- Majority Caucus Chair: Omar Aquino
- Majority Caucus Appropriations Leader: Elgie R. Sims, Jr.
- Majority Caucus Whips:
  - Julie Morrison
  - Cristina Castro
  - Ram Villivalam
  - Robert Peters

==== Senate Minority (Republican) Leadership ====
- Minority Leader: John Curran
- Deputy Minority Leader: Sue Rezin
- Assistant Minority Leaders:
  - Steve McClure
  - Terri Bryant
  - Sally Turner
  - Chapin Rose
- Minority Caucus Chair: Jason Plummer
- Minority Caucus Whip: Jil Tracy

=== House Leadership ===
==== House Majority (Democratic) Leadership ====
- Speaker: Chris Welch
- Speaker pro tempore: Kambium Buckner
- Majority Leader: Robyn Gabel
- Deputy Majority Leaders:
  - Robert Rita
  - Elizabeth Hernandez
- Assistant Majority Leaders:
  - Jay Hoffman
  - Jehan Gordon-Booth
  - Camille Lilly
  - Eva-Dina Delgado
  - Dagmara Avelar
  - Ann Williams
  - Marcus C. Evans Jr.
  - Will Guzzardi
  - Curtis J. Tarver II
  - Maurice West
- Assistant Majority Leaders and Floor Whips:
  - Katie Stuart
  - Bob Morgan
  - Edgar Gonzalez Jr.
- Conference Chair: Theresa Mah
- Majority Officer and Sergeant at Arms: Nick Smith
- Clerk of the House: John Hollman
- Chief Doorkeeper: Nicole Hill
- Parliamentarian: Katherine Bray

==== House Minority (Republican) Leadership ====
- Minority Leader: Tony McCombie
- Deputy Majority Leaders:
  - Norine Hammond
  - Ryan Spain
- Assistant Republican Leader:
  - C. D. Davidsmeyer
  - John Cabello
  - Dan Ugaste
  - Bradley Stephens
  - Jackie Haas
  - Amy Elik
- Republican Conference Chair: Jeff Keicher
- Republican Floor Leader: Patrick Windhorst
- Assistant Clerk of the House: Bradley S. Bolin

== Senate ==
=== Party composition ===
Illinois State Senate party composition
Affiliation	Members
	40
	19
Total	59

=== Leadership ===
- President of the Senate: Don Harmon (D)
- Minority Leader: John Curran (R)

== House ==
=== Party composition ===
Illinois House of Representatives party composition
Affiliation	Members
	78
	40
Total	118

=== Leadership ===
- Speaker of the House: Emanuel Welch (D)
- Minority Leader: Tony McCombie (R)

== Session dates ==
The 104th General Assembly convened on January 8, 2025 and, under the Illinois Constitution, will adjourn sine die on January 13, 2027.

== See also ==
- List of Illinois state legislatures
