= Illinois Legislative Black Caucus =

American political organization

Coordinates: 39.817°N 89.686°W

- Formation: 1968
- Type: Political organization
- Purpose: representing and addressing the interests of African Americans in the Illinois General Assembly
- Location: Springfield, Illinois
- Region served: Illinois, United States of America
- Members: 31 members
- Official language: English
- Joint Chair: Sonya Harper
- Parent organization: National Black Caucus of State Legislators
- Affiliations: Illinois Legislative Black Caucus Foundation
- Staff: 2
- Website: Illinois Legislative Black Caucus

The Illinois Legislative Black Caucus is an American political organization composed of African Americans elected to the Illinois Legislature.

== Priorities ==
The primary mission of the Illinois Legislative Black Caucus is "to assure that the interests of African American citizens are given equitable representation in the General Assembly and that legislative action is directed to address those interests." The Caucus's efforts have focused in the areas of housing, health & welfare, education, employment and minority business enterprise.

Specific priorities include:

- Reform the current education funding inequalities in Illinois Schools
- Develop a comprehensive job training program, which will focus on the top ten zip code areas with the highest unemployment statistics.
- Make Illinois a SAC (State Apprenticeship Council) state.
- Restore education classes to all prisons.
- Develop comprehensive expungement legislation.

== Leadership ==
=== Current officers ===
Officers are elected from within the Caucus with equal representation from both the House and Senate members.

The following legislators are officers of the Illinois Legislative Black Caucus for the 104th General Assembly (2025-26). A full list of members is available on the Caucus' website.

Officer	Position	District
Lakesia Collins	Joint Chair	5 (Senate)
Rita Mayfield	Joint Vice Chair	60 (House)
Willie Preston	Senate Chair	16 (Senate)
Justin Slaughter	House Chair	27 (House)
Kimberly du Buclet	Secretary	30 (Senate)
Adriane Johnson	Treasurer	5 (House)
William Davis	Sergeant at Arms	30 (House)

=== Leadership history ===
The following legislators have served in the leadership team of the Caucus.

Assembly	Joint Chair	Joint Vice Chair	Senate Chair	House Chair	Secretary	Treasurer	Sergeant at Arms
104th (2025-26)	Lakesia Collins	Rita Mayfield	Willie Preston	Justin Slaughter	Kimberly du Buclet	Adriane Johnson	William Davis
103rd (2023-24)	Carol Ammons	—	Robert Peters	Carol Ammons	Debbie Meyers-Martin	Adriane Johnson	William Davis
102nd (2021-22)	Sonya Harper	—	Robert Peters	Kam Buckner	Emil Jones	Lakesia Collins	Curtis Tarver

== History ==
African Americans in the Illinois General Assembly have had the longest uninterrupted presence in any state legislature in the United States, dating back to 1882. The first African American in the Illinois House of Representatives, John W. E. Thomas of Chicago, was elected in 1876, and after not being re-nominated in 1878 and 1880, returned to the House in 1882. The number of African-Americans in the House increased to two in 1912. Adelbert H. Roberts became the first African American in the Illinois Senate in 1924. Roberts, in 1927, became the first to chair a legislative committee, the Senate Committee on Criminal Procedure. Until 1934, all of the African-Americans elected to the General Assembly were Republicans, after which the African-American presence in the legislature gradually shifted to the Democratic caucus. Floy Clements (1958) and Earlene Collins (1977) became the first African-American women to be elected to the House and Senate, respectively. Cecil A. Partee rose to become the first Minority Leader (1973) and President of the Senate (1975).

The Caucus originated in a study group formed by Harold Washington, Louis A.H. Caldwell, Otis Collins, and Calvin Smith (Illinois politician) in 1966. The Caucus was formally established in 1967, and purchased a permanent headquarters in Springfield in 2004.

== Works cited ==
- Williams, Erma Brooks (2008). Political Empowerment of Illinois' African-American State Lawmakers from 1877 to 2005. University Press of America. ISBN 9780761840183.
