= Mike Smiddy =

American politician

Member of the Illinois House of Representatives from the 71st district
- In office January 2013 – January 2017
- Preceded by: Richard Morthland
- Succeeded by: Tony McCombie

Personal details
- Party: Democratic
- Spouse: Deb Smiddy
- Children: Two Children
- Education: Western Illinois University
- Profession: Full Time Legislator

Mike Smiddy was the Illinois state representative for the 71st district. The 71st district includes all or parts of Savanna, Morrison, Sterling, Rock Falls, Port Byron, Hillsdale, Silvis, East Moline, Moline and Coal Valley.
