= Illinois Labor Relations Board =

Illinois state agency

Agency overview
- Jurisdiction: State of Illinois
- Headquarters: Springfield, Illinois
- Agency executives: William E. Lowry Jr.; Lynne Sered

The Illinois Labor Relations Board (ILRB) is a State agency that administers the Illinois Public Labor Relations Act, the Act that governs relations between Illinois public-sector departments, agencies and offices on the one hand, and public-sector employees on the other.

== Description ==
The ILRB is internally divided into two panels. The State Panel handles not only employer-employee relations within the State of Illinois, but also employer-employee relations between most Illinois units of local government and their employees. The Local Panel handles employer-employee relations in which the employer is the city of Chicago or any of its agencies, or is the county (Cook County) that includes Chicago. Chicago and Cook County public-sector employer-employee issues are the responsibility of the separate Local Panel.

As the State's public labor relations panel, the ILRB oversees efforts by workers to unionize, and to de-unionize, Illinois public-sector agencies and workplaces.
