= Sharon Chung =

American politician from Illinois

Member of the Illinois House of Representatives from the 91st district
- Incumbent
- Assumed office January 11, 2023
- Preceded by: Mark Luft

Personal details
- Party: Democratic

Sharon Chung is an American professional musician and politician serving as a member of the Illinois House of Representatives for the 91st district. Elected in 2022, she was the first Korean American elected to the Illinois General Assembly.

== Career ==
Chung worked as a professional violinist before being elected to the McLean County Board in 2018, where she was the first Asian American to serve.

She was elected to the Illinois House of Representatives in the 2022 election, becoming the first Korean American elected to the Illinois General Assembly. She ran for re-election in 2024. Chung won re-election in the general election.

She endorsed the Kamala Harris 2024 presidential campaign.

== Personal life ==
Chung is the daughter of Korean immigrants and a mother of two daughters.
