= Robert W. Pritchard =

American politician

Robert Pritchard

Member of the Illinois House of Representatives from the 70th district
- In office December 2003 – July 2018
- Preceded by: David Wirsing
- Succeeded by: Jeff Keicher

Chairman of the DeKalb County Board
- In office December 1998 – December 2003
- Preceded by: George Daugherty
- Succeeded by: Dennis Sands

Personal details
- Born: March 31, 1945 (age 81) Virgil Township, Illinois, U.S.
- Party: Republican
- Spouse: Mary Pritchard
- Children: Two
- Education: University of Illinois
- Occupation: businessman

Robert W. Pritchard (born February 2, 1945) is a Republican politician who serves on the Northern Illinois University Board of Trustees. He was previously a member of the Illinois House of Representatives, representing the 70th district from December 2003 until July 2018. The 70th district included parts of DeKalb County, Kane and Boone counties.

== Early life, education and career ==
Pritchard was born February 2, 1945, in Aurora, Illinois. He grew up on a farm near Hinckley, Illinois. Pritchard majored in communications at the University of Illinois at Urbana-Champaign and earned both a bachelor's and master's degree. His wife, Mary, is an Associate Dean at Northern Illinois University. They have two grown sons.

After graduation, Pritchard returned to work on the family farm, but also began working as a radio and TV broadcaster for local stations. In keeping with his expertise, Pritchard delivered the farming updates and local weather reports. He also worked in various marketing, public relations and community relation roles at DEKALB Genetics Corporation/Monsanto Company and for several universities.

== Political career ==
Pritchard served on the Hinckley-Big Rock Board of Education and was elected to a leadership position for the DeKalb County Farm Bureau. He was elected to the DeKalb County Board and served as its chairman. In December 2003, Pritchard was appointed to the Illinois House of Representatives after the passing of David A. Wirsing. He was active in such issues as early childhood and education, health care, conservation, the environment, job creation, and protecting the manufacturing industry. He serves as Republican spokesman on the State Government Administration Committee and is co-chair of the Legislative Education Caucus, which he helped form. He announced his retirement from the Illinois General Assembly. He resigned from the Illinois House of Representatives on July 1, 2018, to accept an appointment to the Northern Illinois University Board of Trustees.

During the 2008 Republican Party presidential primaries, Pritchard endorsed the presidential campaign of Rudy Giuliani.
