= Gregg Johnson (politician) =

American politician in Illinois

Member of the Illinois House of Representatives from the 72nd district
- Incumbent
- Assumed office January 11, 2023
- Preceded by: Michael Halpin

Personal details
- Born: 1964 (61 years old)
- Party: Democratic
- Spouse: Celia Johnson
- Children: 3
- Education: Rockridge High School

Gregg Johnson is an American politician and former correctional officer serving as a Democratic member of the Illinois House of Representatives, representing the 72nd district since January 2023. The District covers a majority of Rock Island County including the cities of Rock Island, Moline, East Moline, Milan, Silvis, and Hampton.

A life long resident of the area, Johnson has focused his legislative efforts on workers' rights, public safety, education, women's rights, and improving access to mental health care. Prior to his election to the general assembly, he worked for over two decades in the Illinois Department of Corrections and spent 32 years as an active union member and leader, eventually serving as president of his AFSCME local.

== Education ==
Johnson graduated from Rockridge High School in Taylor Ridge, IL in 1982.

== Election ==
=== 2018 Illinois Senate ===
In 2018, Gregg Johnson ran as the Democratic nominee for the Illinois State Senate in the 36th District. He challenged incumbent Republican Senator Neil Anderson. Despite a strong campaign focused on labor rights and public service, Johnson was defeated in the general election. Anderson received 50.8% of the vote, while Johnson garnered 49.3%.

=== 2022 Illinois House of Representatives ===
In 2022, Johnson entered the race for the Illinois House of Representatives in the 72nd District after incumbent Michael Halpin announced a run for the State Senate. Johnson won a highly competitive three-way Democratic primary, receiving 35.6% of the vote defeating Thurgood Brooks (35.3%) and Jeff Deppe (29.0%).

In the general election he defeated Republican Tom martens carrying 60.2% of the vote.

=== 2024 Illinois House of Representatives ===
In 2024, Johnson sought re-election to the Illinois House of Representatives. He was unopposed in the Democratic primary and faced Republican Charlie Helmick in the general election. Johnson won a second term with 61.0% of the vote continuing to campaign on issues such as workers' rights, public safety, education, and access to mental health care.

== Illinois General Assembly ==
Representative Johnson is a member of the following Illinois House of Representatives Committees:

- Education Policy
- Labor & Commerce
- Mental Health & Addiction
- Police & Fire Committee
- Fire Subcommittee
- Police Subcommittee
- Prescription Drug Affordability
- Veterans' Affairs
- Wage Policy Study Subcommittee

=== 103rd General Assembly (2023-2024) ===
During his first term in the 103rd Illinois General Assembly, Representative Gregg Johnson focused on legislation aimed at strengthening labor protections, improving public understanding of worker rights, and supporting regional development.

His first bill signed into law, HB2448, set new training and certification standards for Illinois conservation police officers. He was the House sponsor of SB1897, which created the Rock Island Regional Port District to promote economic development in the Quad Cities region. The bill gave the City of Rock Island initial control over the district while allowing neighboring municipalities to join through annexation.

He was also the House sponsor of SB2368, which updated state building code laws by revising inspection requirements, clarifying when codes apply during construction, and changing how smaller municipalities and counties identify local building codes.

Johnson sponsored SB3354, which created a task force to study ways to expand community-based corrections and rehabilitation in Illinois, with a focus on pretrial services and probation.

Johnson also sponsored HB4417, which established Workplace Readiness Week in Illinois public high schools. The law requires schools to educate students on their rights as workers and the role of labor movements, with targeted instruction for juniors and seniors.

And in the area of worker safety, Johnson introduced HB4954, which modified liability protections for mine rescue personnel under the Coal Mining Act, allowing for accountability in rescue operations unless actions were taken in good faith. Collectively, his early legislative record reflected a commitment to labor advocacy, regional investment, criminal justice reform, and practical governance.

=== 104th General Assembly (2024-2025) ===
During the 104th Illinois General Assembly, Representative Gregg Johnson sponsored and supported legislation across a variety of policy areas including labor law updates, mental health, university financing, human trafficking prevention, and retirement savings.

He sponsored HB2488, which amended the Equal Pay Act of 2003 and the Prevailing Wage Act by removing references to the federal Annual Employer Information Report and updating specified references to the Office of Apprenticeship within the U.S. Department of Labor’s Employment and Training Administration. The bill streamlined state law to better align with current federal standards and was effective immediately.

Johnson carried SB0188, which extended the repeal date of the Out-of-State Person Subject to Involuntary Admission on an Inpatient Basis Mental Health Treatment Act from January 1, 2026 to January 1, 2031. This extension ensured continued coordination for the involuntary admission process across state lines. The bill was effective immediately.

He was the House sponsor of SB1310, which amended the Western Illinois University Law to grant the Board of Trustees the authority to borrow up to $2 million from the WIU Foundation or financial institutions for any lawful purpose, with the requirement that the debt be repaid within five years. The bill also required a promissory note or similar debt instrument to evidence the borrowing.

Johnson supported SB1422, which renamed the Lodging Establishment Human Trafficking Recognition Training Act to the Human Trafficking Recognition Training Act. The bill expanded its scope by changing references from “lodging establishment, restaurant, or truck stop” to “employer,” thereby broadening the training requirement to all employers. It also authorized the Department of Human Services to enforce penalties under the Act and removed the prior effective date, making it immediately enforceable.

Finally, Johnson sponsored SB1441, which amended the Illinois Secure Choice Savings Program Act to establish that accounts under the program would be IRAs, allowing enrollees to contribute to Roth and Traditional IRAs. The bill required accounts to be portable and allowed contributions from multiple employers into a single account. It also directed the Illinois Secure Choice Savings Board to assess the feasibility of agreements with other governmental entities to achieve cost savings and updated penalties for employers failing to comply with enrollment and contribution requirements. This legislation was effective immediately
