= Jason Bunting =

American politician

Jason Bunting is a Republican member of the Illinois House of Representatives. Bunting was appointed by the Republican Representative Committee of the 106th Representative District to represent the 106th district on February 4, 2023. The 106th district, located in Central Illinois, includes all or parts of Ford, Grundy, Iroquois, LaSalle, Livingston, McLean, and Will counties.

Prior to his appointment to the Illinois House of Representatives, Bunting, a farmer, and resident of Emington, served as a member of the Livingston County Board, Highway Commissioner for Broughton Township, a regional director for the Illinois Corn Growers Association, and President of the Livingston County Farm Bureau.

In 2026, Bunting was elected to the Illinois Republican State Central Committee by a weighted vote of elected precinct committeemen in Illinois's 2nd congressional district.
