= Nicole La Ha =

American politician and beauty pageant winner

Member of the Illinois House of Representatives from the 82nd district
- Incumbent
- Assumed office December 20, 2023
- Preceded by: John Egofske

Personal details
- Party: Republican

Nicole La Ha is an American politician serving as a member of the Illinois House of Representatives for the 82nd district. Her district includes Willowbrook, Burr Ridge, Willow Springs, Darien, Western Springs, Homer Glen, Lemont, and portions of Countryside, Downers Grove, Hickory Hills, Hinsdale, Indian Head Park, LaGrange, Justice, Orland Park, Palos Park, and Woodridge.

She is of Mexican descent.

Her legislative priorities include lowering costs for families, advocating for seniors, fighting against human trafficking, enhancing public safety, lowering health-care costs, and lowering property taxes.

In 2022, she won the Mrs. America beauty contest. She began her career as a public servant by serving as a Homer Glen village trustee. As one of the founders of the Ability Awareness Committee in Homer Glen, La Ha has spearheaded initiatives promoting inclusivity and education within the community.

She served as the Illinois Senate Press Secretary for the 102nd General Assembly under Leader Dan McConchie and remained on Senate staff until December 2023. Nicole was also named to the prestigious 2024 Edgar Fellows class and was recognized by the National Foundation for Women Legislators with the “2024 Elected Women of Excellence Award,” reflecting her leadership and impact within her community.

La Ha graduated from The School of the Art Institute of Chicago in 2004 with a Bachelor of Fine Arts in Art History, focusing on Museum Curation and Fine Arts. Later, she pursued a degree in Science and Health with a Dental Hygiene accreditation from the University of Illinois at Chicago (UIC) College of Dentistry and Kennedy-King College, maintaining her active healthcare provider license in Illinois.

La Ha is also a licensed dental hygienist. She resides in Homer Glen with her family. Her daughter has cerebral palsy. La Ha authored a children's book entitled My Sister is Just Like You and Me which is about inclusion.
