= Mary Beth Canty =

American politician

Member of the Illinois House of Representatives from the 54th district
- Incumbent
- Assumed office January 11, 2023
- Preceded by: Tom Morrison

Personal details
- Born: 1980 or 1981 (age 45–46)
- Party: Democratic
- Education: College of William and Mary (BA); University of Arizona (JD)

Mary Beth Canty (born 1980/1981) is an American lawyer and politician serving as a member of the Illinois House of Representatives for the 54th district.
