= Dennis Tipsword =

American politician in Illinois

Member of the Illinois House of Representatives from the 105th district
- Incumbent
- Assumed office January 11, 2023
- Preceded by: Dan Brady

Personal details
- Party: Republican

Dennis Tipsword Jr. is an American politician who is a member of the Illinois House of Representatives for the 105th district. In August 2025, Tipsword announced he would forgo reelection to run for Woodford County sheriff.
