= Rick Ryan =

American politician

Member of the Illinois House of Representatives from the 36th district
- Incumbent
- Assumed office January 8, 2025
- Preceded by: Kelly M. Burke

Personal details
- Born: Oak Lawn, Illinois
- Party: Democratic
- Education: DePaul University; Atlanta's John Marshall Law School
- Website: www.rickryan36district.com

Rick Ryan is an American politician. He serves as a Democratic member of the Illinois House of Representatives for District 36 since 2025.

== Personal life ==
Ryan has lived in Evergreen Park for over 30 years with his wife and their three sons.
