= Michael Kelly (Illinois politician) =

American politician

Member of the Illinois House of Representatives from the 15th district
- Incumbent
- Assumed office November 23, 2021
- Preceded by: John C. D'Amico

Personal details
- Born: June 23, 1975 (age 51)
- Party: Democratic
- Education: Quincy University (BA)

Michael Kelly (born June 23, 1975) is a Democratic member of the Illinois House of Representatives from the 15th district since his appointment on November 23, 2021. The 15th district, located in the Chicago area, includes parts of Morton Grove, Niles, Park Ridge, and includes parts of the Chicago neighborhoods of Albany Park, Forest Glen, North Park.

He was appointed in 2021 to succeed longtime Democratic State Representative John C. D'Amico, who retired earlier in November that year.

== Early life, education, and career ==
Kelly grew up in Mayfair, Chicago. He attended Saint Edward Elementary School and St. Patrick High School. He graduated from Quincy University with a degree in business management. He has served as a firefighter for the Chicago Fire Department since 2003 and works as an athletic director for Saint Edward School.

As of July 3, 2022, Representative Kelly is a member of the following Illinois House committees:

- Cities & Villages Committee (HCIV)
- Police & Fire Committee (SHPF)
- Transportation: Vehicles & Safety Committee (HVES)

== Electoral history ==
Illinois 15th Representative District Democratic Primary, 2022
Party	Candidate	Votes	%
Democratic	Michael J. Kelly (incumbent)	6,282	52.36
Democratic	Michael Patrick Rabbitt	5,715	47.64
Total votes		11,997	100.0

Illinois 15th Representative District General Election, 2022
Party	Candidate	Votes	%
Democratic	Michael J. Kelly (incumbent)	20,984	65.57
Republican	Mark R. Albers	11,018	34.43
Total votes		32,002	100.0
