= Mary Gill (Illinois politician) =

American politician in Illinois

Member of the Illinois House of Representatives from the 35th district
- Incumbent
- Assumed office March 28, 2023
- Preceded by: Frances Ann Hurley

Personal details
- Party: Democratic

Mary Gill is an American politician serving as a member of the Illinois House of Representatives for the 35th district. She is a moderate Democrat.

Gill was executive director of the Mount Greenwood Community and Business Association.
