= Natalie Manley =

American politician

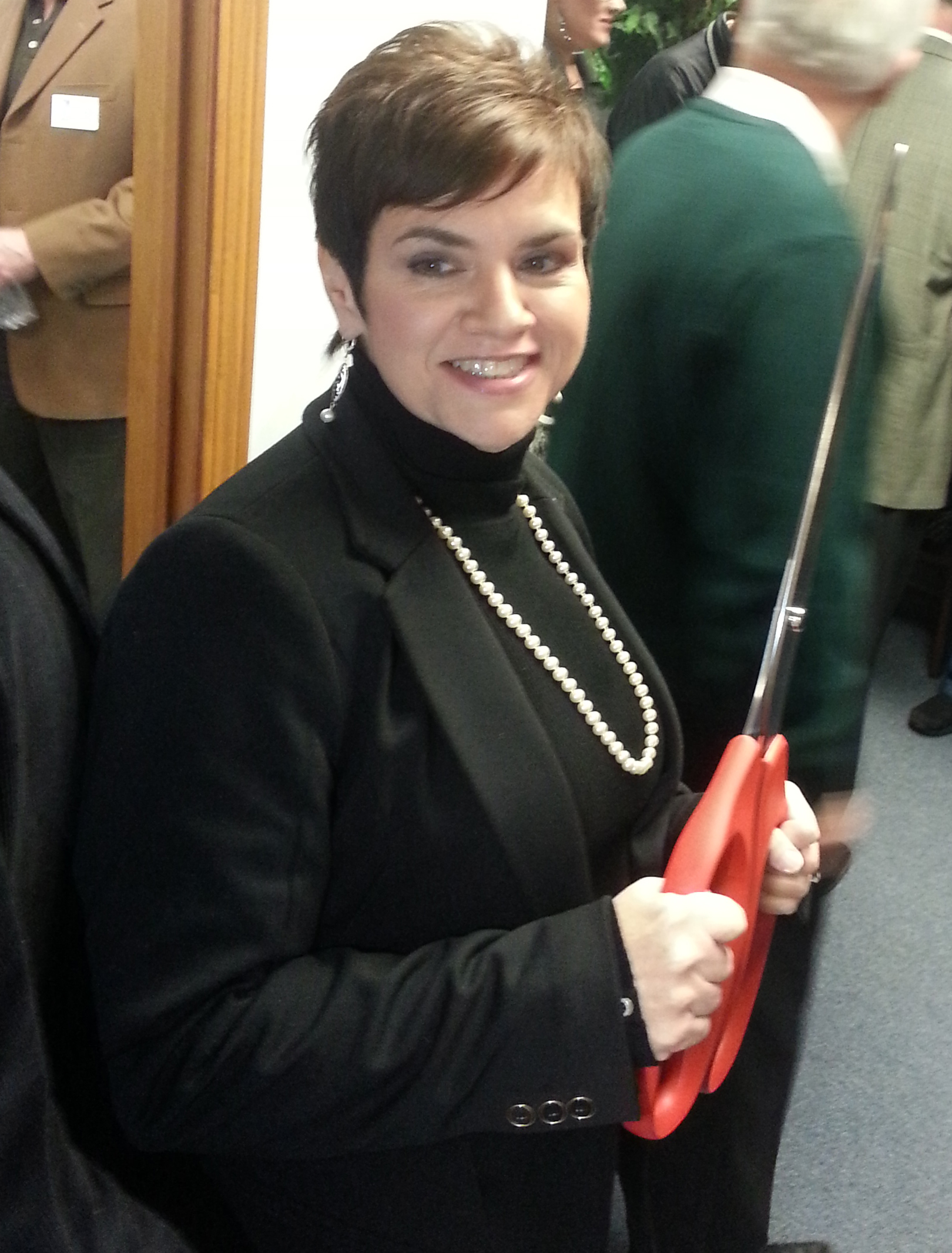
- Rep. Manley at Joliet Ribbon Cutting (2013)

Member of the Illinois House of Representatives from the 98th district
- Incumbent
- Assumed office January 2013
- Preceded by: New District

Personal details
- Born: December 25, 1961 (age 64)
- Party: Democratic
- Children: 1
- Education: University of St. Francis
- Profession: Certified Public Accountant; Radio Show Host

Natalie A. Manley (born December 25, 1961) is a member of the Illinois House of Representatives representing the 98th district since 2013. She is a member of the Democratic party. The 98th district includes all or parts of Bolingbrook, Crest Hill, Crystal Lawns, Romeoville and Joliet.

== Early life, education and career ==
Manley is a certified public accountant with a BA in Business Administration from the University of St. Francis. Prior to her election, she worked as an accountant at a private firm and co-hosted a talk show on local radio station WJOL.

== Illinois General Assembly ==
Manley was first elected to the Illinois House in November 2012, assuming office in January 2013. In January 2019, she was appointed Assistant Majority Leader.

As of July 3, 2022, Representative Manley is a member of the following Illinois House committees:

- Business & Innovation Subcommittee (HLBR-BUIN)
- Elementary & Secondary Education: School Curriculum & Policies Committee (HELM)
- Ethics & Elections Committee (SHEE)
- Labor & Commerce Committee (HLBR)
- Police & Fire Committee (SHPF)
- Workforce Development Subcommittee (HLBR-WORK)
