= Nicolle Grasse =

American politician

Member of the Illinois House of Representatives from the 53rd district
- Incumbent
- Assumed office June 5, 2024
- Preceded by: Mark L. Walker

Personal details
- Party: Democratic

Nicolle Grasse is an American politician serving as a member of the Illinois House of Representatives for the 53rd district.

== Career ==
Grasse was a village trustee in Arlington Heights. In 2024, she was appointed to replace Mark L. Walker.
