= Diane Blair-Sherlock =

American politician in Illinois

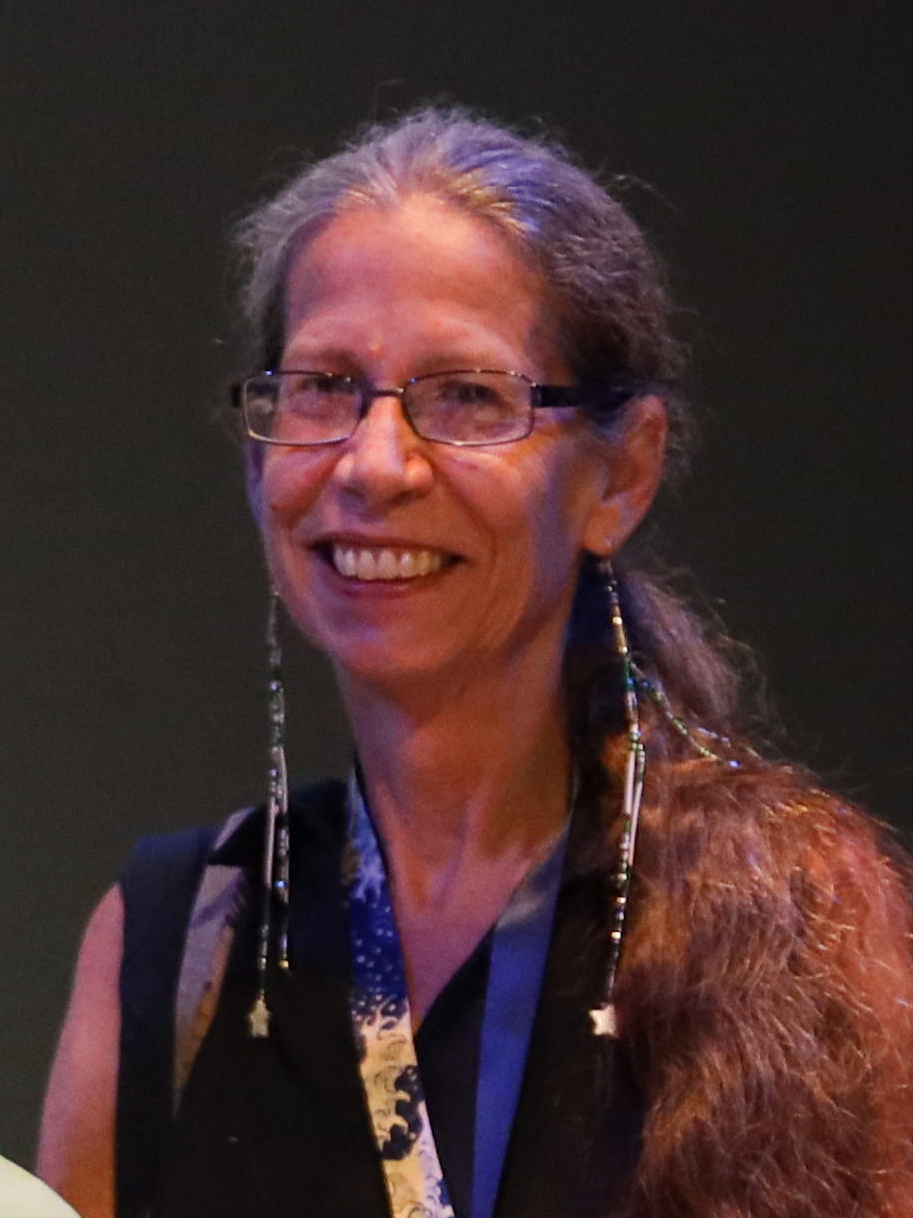
- Blair-Sherlock in 2025

Member of the Illinois House of Representatives from the 46th district
- Incumbent
- Assumed office December 7, 2022
- Preceded by: Deb Conroy

Personal details
- Party: Democratic
- Education: College of DuPage; Northern Illinois University; John Marshall Law School

Diane Blair-Sherlock is an American politician serving as a member of the Illinois House of Representatives for the 46th district. She went to the College of Dupage and Northern Illinois University where she got a B.A in Political Science. She then attended John Marshall Law School where she got her Juris Doctor. She is a wife and a mother of two and currently resides in Villa Park.

In the 103rd General Assembly, Rep. Blair-Sherlock serves on the following committees: Approp-Elementary & Secondary Educ; Elem Sec Ed: School Curric Policies; Energy & Environment; State Government Administration (Vice-Chairperson).
