= Sue Scherer =

American politician

Member of the Illinois House of Representatives from the 96th district
- Incumbent
- Assumed office January 2013
- Preceded by: Darlene Senger (redistricted)

Personal details
- Party: Democratic
- Children: 4
- Education: Illinois State University (BA); Eastern Illinois University (MEd)
- Profession: Retired Teacher
- Committees: Appropriations-Capital, Child Care Access & Early Childhood, Consumer Protection, Elementary & Secondary Education: Administration, Licensing & Charter School (Chair), Transportation: Regulation, Roads & Bridges
- Website: www.facebook.com/staterepsue96

Sue Scherer is the Illinois state representative for the 96th district, serving since 2013. She is a member of the Democratic party. The 96th district includes all or parts of Springfield, Decatur, Taylorville, Blue Mound, Mount Auburn, Niantic, Edinburg and Rochester.

As of July 3, 2022, Representative Scherer is a member of the following Illinois House committees:

- Appropriations - Elementary & Secondary Education Committee (HAPE)
- (Chairwoman of) Citizen Impact Subcommittee (HMAC-CITI)
- (Chairwoman of) Elementary & Secondary Education: Administration, Licenses & Charter Committee (HELO)
- Higher Education Committee (HHED)
- Museums, Arts, & Cultural Enhancement Committee (HMAC)
- Small Business, Tech Innovation & Entrepreneurship Committee (SBTE)
