= Tom Weber =

American politician

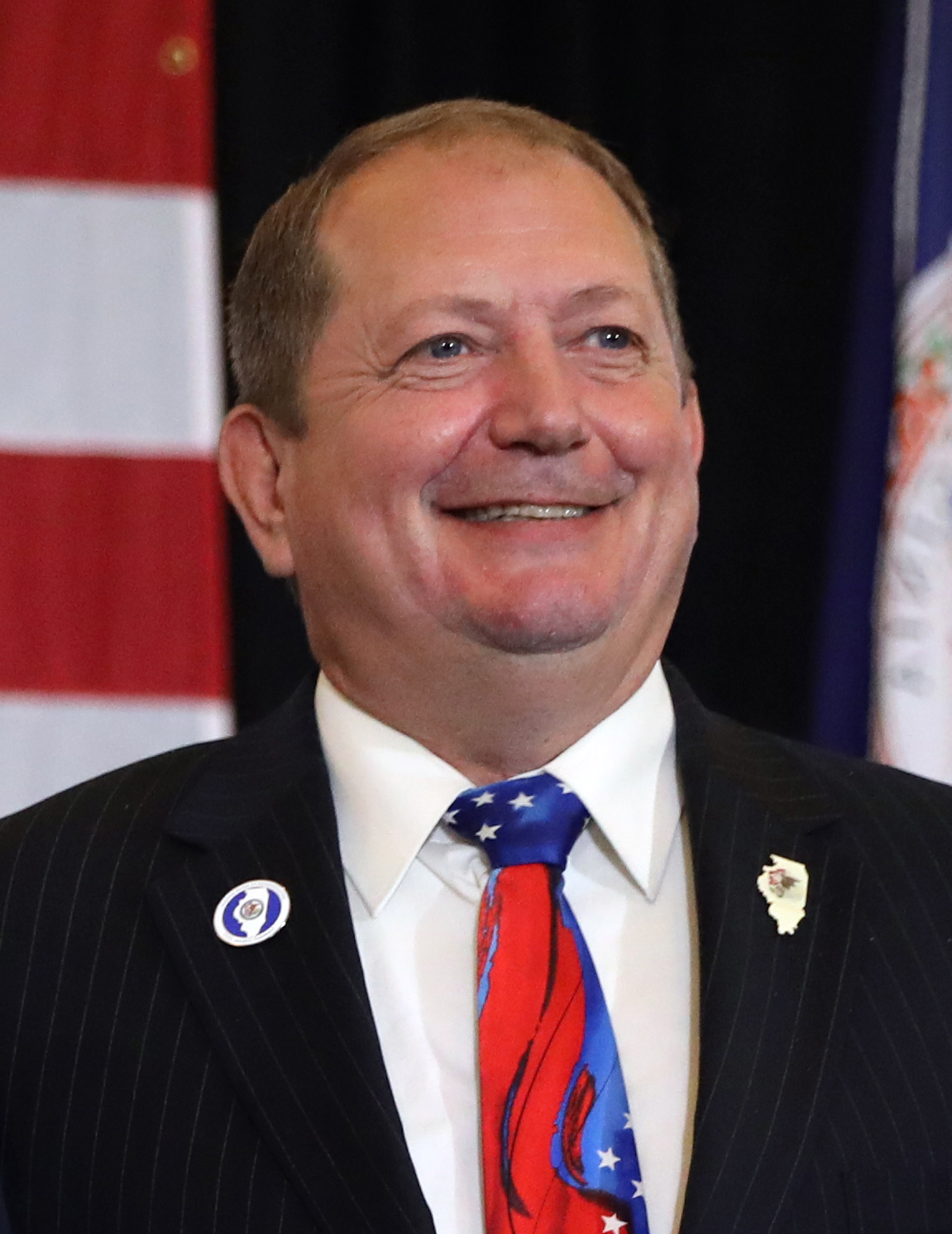

Member of the Illinois House of Representatives from the 64th district
- Incumbent
- Assumed office January 9, 2019
- Preceded by: Barbara Wheeler

Personal details
- Born: 1966 or 1967 (age 58–59) Lake Villa, Illinois, U.S.
- Party: Republican
- Profession: Contractor

Tom Weber is a Republican member of the Illinois House of Representatives for the 64th district. The district includes all or parts of Antioch, Bull Valley, Crystal Lake, Fox Lake, Lake Villa, Lakemoor, Volo, and Woodstock.

Weber, a former Lake County Board member, defeated Democratic candidate Trisha Zubert in the 2018 general election.

As of July 3, 2022, Representative Weber is a member of the following committees:

- Appropriations - General Service Committee (HAPG)
- Counties & Townships Committee (HCOT)
- Ethics & Elections Committee (SHEE)
- Health Care Availability & Access Committee (HHCA)
- Human Services Committee (HHSV)
- Public Benefits Subcommittee (HHSV-PUBX)

== Electoral history ==
Illinois 64th Representative District General Election, 2020
Party	Candidate	Votes	%	±%
Republican	Tom Weber (incumbent)	35,162	59.77	+3.05%
Democratic	Leslie Armstrong-McLeod	23,665	40.23	−3.05%
Total votes		58,827	100.0	

Illinois 64th Representative District General Election, 2018
Party	Candidate	Votes	%
Republican	Tom Weber	23,929	56.72
Democratic	Trisha Zubert	18,262	43.28
Total votes		42,191	100.0
