= Anna Moeller =

American politician

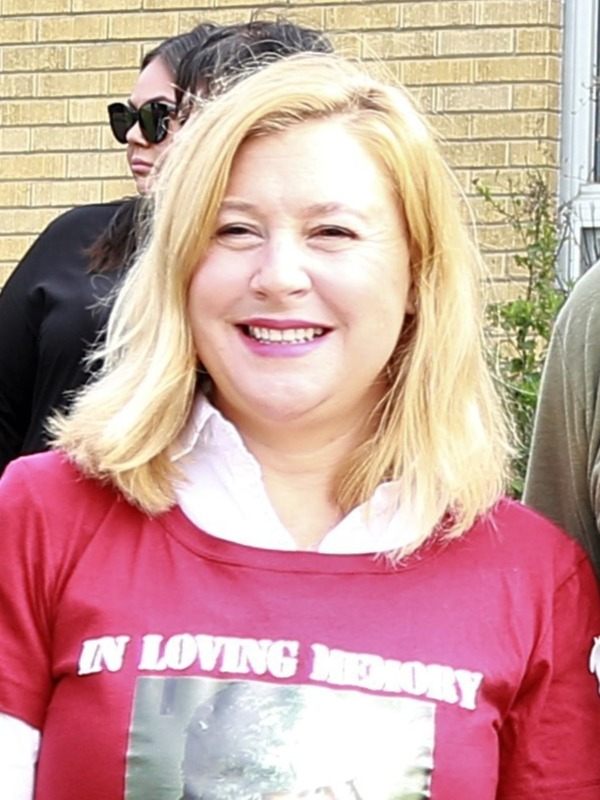
- Moeller in 2019

Member of the Illinois House of Representatives from the 43rd district
- Incumbent
- Assumed office March 30, 2014
- Preceded by: Keith Farnham

Personal details
- Born: December 19, 1971 (age 54) Berkeley, California, U.S.
- Party: Democratic
- Spouse: Marc Moeller
- Children: 2
- Education: Northern Illinois University (BA, MPA)
- Website: Campaign website

Anna C. Moeller (born 1971 in Berkeley, California) is a member of the Illinois House of Representatives who was sworn in March 31, 2014. She previously served on the Elgin City Council and as Executive Director of the McHenry County Council of Governments. She was named an Edgar Fellow in 2012, a Bowhay Legislative Leadership Fellow in 2017 and Toll Fellow in 2024. Anna Moeller graduated from Northern Illinois University with a BA in History and MPA in Public Administration. She represents the 43rd district which includes all or parts of Elgin, Barrington Hills, Carpentersville, East Dundee and South Elgin. Since taking office, Anna Moeller has championed legislation on pay equity for women and people of color, insurance and pension reform, environmental protection, access to healthcare and legislation that advance LGBTQ equality.

As of March 22, 2025, Representative Moeller is a member of the following Illinois House committees:

- Appropriations - Human Services Committee, Chairwoman (HAPH)
- Elementary & Secondary Education: Administration, Licensing & Charter Schools Committee (HELO)
- Energy & Environment Committee (HENG)
- Health Care Licenses Committee (HHCL)
- Human Services Committee (HHSV)
- Special Issues (HS) Subcommittee (HHSV-SPIS)
- Wages & Rates Subcommittee (HAPH-WAGE)

== Electoral history ==
Illinois 43rd State House District General Election, 2014
Party	Candidate	Votes	%
Democratic	Anna Moeller (incumbent)	8,767	60.07
Republican	Jeffrey A. Meyer	5,827	39.93
Total votes		14,594	100.0

Illinois 43rd State House District General Election, 2016
Party	Candidate	Votes	%
Democratic	Anna Moeller (incumbent)	22,274	98.97
Write-in votes	Richard Evans	231	1.03
Total votes		22,505	100.0

Illinois 43rd State House District General Election, 2018
Party	Candidate	Votes	%
Democratic	Anna Moeller (incumbent)	14,631	70.61
Republican	Andrew R. Cuming	6,090	29.39
Total votes		20,721	100.0

Illinois 43rd State House District General Election, 2020
Party	Candidate	Votes	%
Democratic	Anna Moeller (incumbent)	23,849	100.00

Illinois 43rd State House District General Election, 2022
Party	Candidate	Votes	%
Democratic	Anna Moeller (incumbent)	11,274	63.87
Republican	Angela Hallock Nowak	6,377	36.13
Total votes		17,651	100.0

Illinois 43rd State House District General Election, 2024
Party	Candidate	Votes	%
Democratic	Anna Moeller (incumbent)	18,314	63.93
Republican	Donald P. Puckett	10,332	36.07
Total votes		28,646	100.0
