= Curtis Tarver =

American politician

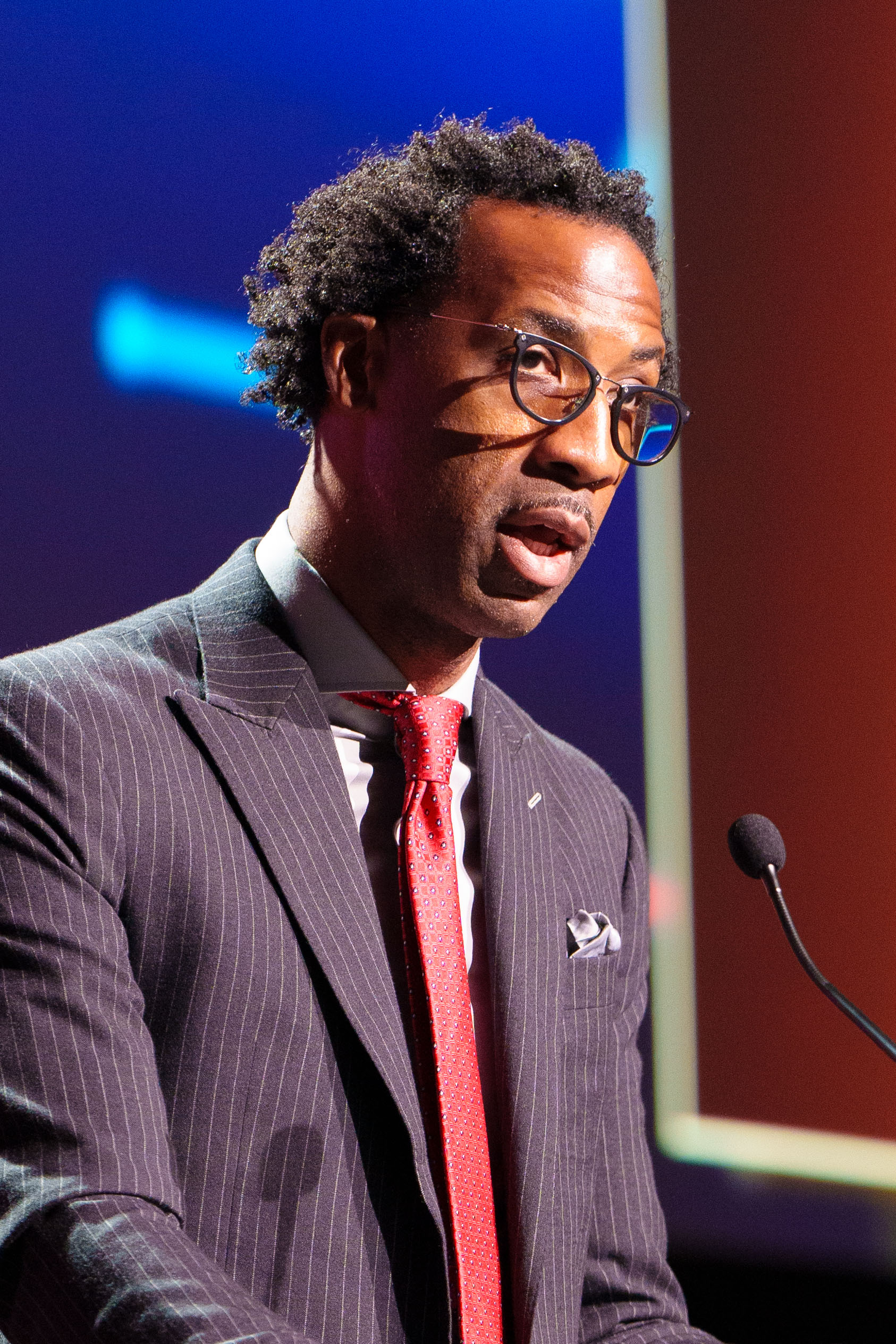

Member of the Illinois House of Representatives from the 25th district
- Incumbent
- Assumed office January 9, 2019
- Preceded by: Barbara Flynn Currie

Personal details
- Party: Democratic
- Education: Iowa State University (BS); University of Iowa (JD)

Curtis J. Tarver II is a Democratic member of the Illinois House of Representatives for the 25th district. The Chicago-based district includes all or parts of East Side, Hyde Park, Kenwood, South Chicago, South Shore, and Woodlawn. He serves as the sergeant-at-arms for the Illinois Legislative Black Caucus.

In the 2018 Democratic primary, Tarver defeated eight other candidates in the heavily Democratic district to succeed longtime Representative Barbara Flynn Currie. Tarver is an attorney who attended Iowa State University and the University of Iowa College of Law.

As of May 7, 2023, Tarver is a member of the following Illinois House committees:

- (Chairman of) Civil Procedure & Tort Liability Subcommittee (HJUA-CIVI)
- (Chairman of) Counties & Townships Committee (HCOT)
- (Chairman of) Tax Credit and Incentives Subcommittee (HREF-HTCI)
- Income Tax Subcommittee (HREF-INTX)
- Judiciary - Civil Committee (HJUA)
- Revenue & Finance Committee (HREF)

== Early life and education ==
Tarver grew up on the South Side and attended Marian Catholic High School in Chicago Heights. He went on to attend Iowa State University, graduating with a B.S. degree in 2003, and University of Iowa College of Law, graduating with a J.D. degree in 2006.

== Electoral history ==
Illinois 25th Representative District Democratic primary, 2018
Party	Candidate	Votes	%
Democratic	Curtis J. Tarver II	4,737	25.21
Democratic	Flynn Rush	3,071	16.34
Democratic	Grace Chan McKibben	2,838	15.10
Democratic	Adrienne Irmer	2,811	14.96
Democratic	Angelique N. Collins	2,260	12.03
Democratic	Anne Marie Miles	1,731	9.21
Democratic	William Calloway	1,343	7.15
Total votes		18,791	100.0

Illinois 25th Representative District general election, 2018
Party	Candidate	Votes	%
Democratic	Curtis J. Tarver II	32,796	99.93
Write-in		23	0.07
Total votes		32,819	100.0

Illinois 25th Representative District general election, 2020
Party	Candidate	Votes	%
Democratic	Curtis J. Tarver II (incumbent)	35,396	100.0
Total votes		35,396	100.0

Illinois 25th Representative District Democratic primary, 2022
Party	Candidate	Votes	%
Democratic	Curtis J. Tarver II (incumbent)	9,890	76.55
Democratic	Josef Michael Carr	3,029	23.45
Total votes		12,919	100.0

Illinois 25th Representative District general election, 2022
Party	Candidate	Votes	%
Democratic	Curtis J. Tarver II (incumbent)	23,792	100.0
Total votes		23,792	100.0
