= Jeff Keicher =

American politician

Member of the Illinois House of Representatives from the 70th district
- Incumbent
- Assumed office July 2, 2018
- Preceded by: Robert W. Pritchard

Personal details
- Party: Republican
- Children: 3
- Education: Northern Illinois University (BS)
- Profession: Insurance Agent
- Website: https://repkeicher.com

Jeff Keicher is a Republican member of the Illinois House of Representatives who represents the 70th district. The 70th district included parts of DeKalb County, Kane and Boone counties. Keicher was appointed to the Illinois House of Representatives in July 2018 to replace outgoing Representative Robert W. Pritchard after the latter's appointment to the Northern Illinois University Board of Trustees. Keicher is an insurance agent by trade and resides in Sycamore, Illinois.

As of 2023, Representative Keicher is a member of the following Illinois House committees:

-Cybersecurity, Data Analytics, & IT -Gaming -Immigration & Human Rights -Insurance
