= Robert Rita =

American politician

Bob Rita

Member of the Illinois House of Representatives from the 28th district
- Incumbent
- Assumed office January 8, 2003
- Preceded by: Tom Dart

Personal details
- Born: October 2, 1969 (age 56) Oak Lawn, Illinois, U.S.
- Party: Democratic
- Education: Moraine Valley Community College; Governors State University

Robert "Bob" Rita (born October 2, 1969) is a Democratic member of the Illinois House of Representatives for the 28th District since January 8, 2003. Rita is also the Calumet Township Democratic committeeman and a trustee on the township board. His state representative district includes parts of Chicago's 9th and 34th wards, as well as several suburbs. Rita lists economic redevelopment, equitable school funding and increased health care availability as his top priorities in the state legislature. Rita is an Operating Engineer and a member of Local #150.

Rita has been re-elected four times, and was unopposed in the 2008 general election. His opponent in the February 5, 2008 Democratic primary, Earick Rayburn, was backed by William Dugan - then-head of Operating Engineers Union Local 150. The union contributed nearly $100,000 to Rayburn's campaign. Rita defeated Rayburn by a margin of more than 3-to-1 in the primary, and received about 60% of the vote in a five candidate race.

As of July 3, 2022, Representative Rita is a member of the following Illinois House committees:

- Cities & Villages Committee (HCIV)
- Cybersecurity, Data Analytics, & IT Committee (HCDA)
- Ethics & Elections Committee (SHEE)
- (Chairman of) Executive Committee (HEXC)
- Prescription Drug Affordability Committee (HPDA)
- Revenue & Finance Committee (HREF)
- (Chairman of) Sales, Amusements, and Other Taxes Subcommittee (HREF-SATX)

== Electoral history ==
Illinois 28th Representative District Democratic Primary, 2002
Party	Candidate	Votes	%
Democratic	Robert "Bob" Rita	6,855	37.55
Democratic	Arvin Boddie	6,427	35.20
Democratic	Derrick C. Davis	4,976	27.25
Total votes		18,258	100.0

Illinois 28th Representative District General Election, 2002
Party	Candidate	Votes	%
Democratic	Robert "Bob" Rita	23,544	79.84
Republican	Wayland Johnson Jr.	4,703	15.95
Libertarian	Jerome F. Kohn	1,241	4.21
Total votes		29,488	100.0

Illinois 28th Representative District Democratic Primary, 2004
Party	Candidate	Votes	%
Democratic	Robert "Bob" Rita (incumbent)	9,739	56.60
Democratic	Arvin Boddie	3,066	17.82
Democratic	Brenda Williams	2,757	16.02
Democratic	Ladonna Thomas	896	5.21
Democratic	Katrina "Ki-ki" Gines	750	4.36
Total votes		17,208	100.0

Illinois 28th Representative District General Election, 2004
Party	Candidate	Votes	%
Democratic	Robert "Bob" Rita (incumbent)	35,592	84.62
Republican	Michael Fredette	6,468	15.38
Total votes		42,060	100.0

Illinois 28th Representative District Democratic Primary, 2006
Party	Candidate	Votes	%
Democratic	Robert "Bob" Rita (incumbent)	10,119	76.18
Democratic	Brenda Williams	2,963	22.31
Democratic	Florida Cresswell	201	1.51
Total votes		13,283	100.0

Illinois 28th Representative District General Election, 2006
Party	Candidate	Votes	%
Democratic	Robert "Bob" Rita (incumbent)	23,809	84.66
Republican	Christopher G. Newhall	4,315	15.34
Total votes		28,124	100.0

Illinois 28th Representative District Democratic Primary, 2008
Party	Candidate	Votes	%
Democratic	Robert "Bob" Rita (incumbent)	14,530	60.67
Democratic	Earick D. Rayburn	4,455	18.60
Democratic	James J. Taylor	2,083	8.70
Democratic	Pamela "Little Pam" Caston	1,510	6.30
Democratic	Michael E. Mayden	1,373	5.73
Total votes		23,951	100.0

Illinois 28th Representative District General Election, 2008
Party	Candidate	Votes	%
Democratic	Robert "Bob" Rita (incumbent)	38,054	100.0
Total votes		38,054	100.0

Illinois 28th Representative District General Election, 2010
Party	Candidate	Votes	%
Democratic	Robert "Bob" Rita (incumbent)	24,428	100.0
Total votes		24,428	100.0

Illinois 28th Representative District General Election, 2012
Party	Candidate	Votes	%
Democratic	Robert "Bob" Rita (incumbent)	37,179	100.0
Total votes		37,179	100.0

Illinois 28th Representative District General Election, 2014
Party	Candidate	Votes	%
Democratic	Robert "Bob" Rita (incumbent)	26,395	100.0
Total votes		26,395	100.0

Illinois 28th Representative District General Election, 2016
Party	Candidate	Votes	%
Democratic	Robert "Bob" Rita (incumbent)	37,190	100.0
Total votes		37,190	100.0

Illinois 28th Representative District Democratic Primary, 2018
Party	Candidate	Votes	%
Democratic	Robert "Bob" Rita (incumbent)	11,123	69.99
Democratic	Mary Carvlin	2,752	17.32
Democratic	Kimberly Nicole Koschnitzky	2,017	12.69
Total votes		15,892	100.0

Illinois 28th Representative District General Election, 2018
Party	Candidate	Votes	%
Democratic	Robert "Bob" Rita (incumbent)	28,841	100.0
Total votes		28,841	100.0

Illinois 28th Representative District General Election, 2020
Party	Candidate	Votes	%
Democratic	Robert "Bob" Rita (incumbent)	37,640	99.36
Write-in		243	0.64
Total votes		37,883	100.0
