= Ryan Spain =

American politician

Member of the Illinois House of Representatives from the 73rd district
- Incumbent
- Assumed office January 11, 2017
- Preceded by: David R. Leitch

Member of the Peoria City Council
- In office May 1, 2007 – October 5, 2016

Personal details
- Born: October 11, 1982 (age 43) Peoria, Illinois, U.S.
- Party: Republican
- Children: 2
- Education: University of Illinois; Bradley University

Ryan Spain (born October 11, 1982) is a Republican member of the Illinois House of Representatives, representing the 73rd district which includes parts of Bureau, Marshall, Peoria, Rock Island, Stark and Whiteside counties in west central Illinois.

== Early life and career ==
At age 24, Spain was elected an at-large member of the Peoria City Council. He was sworn on May 1, 2007. On October 5, 2016, Spain announced his resignation from the City Council with an effective date of November 18, 2016.

Spain has undergraduate degrees in political science and speech communications from the University of Illinois at Urbana-Champaign, and an M.B.A. from Bradley University. Prior to his service in the Illinois House, Spain was Vice President of Government Relations at OSF HealthCare, which included serving as one of OSF Healthcare's lobbyists on Capitol Hill. As of 2020, Spain is Vice President of Economic Development with OSF.

== State legislature ==
On October 8, 2015, Representative David R. Leitch, the most senior Republican in the Illinois House of Representatives, announced that he would not seek re-election to the House from the 73rd district. The 73rd district consisted, at the time, of all or parts of Bureau, Marshall, Peoria, Stark, Woodford, and LaSalle counties in west central Illinois. Spain was elected to the Illinois House of Representatives in the 2016 general election to succeed Leitch.

As part of the 2021 decennial reapportionment, the 73rd district was redrawn to add parts of Bureau, Rock Island and Whiteside counties while removing LaSalle and Woodford counties, and removing various portions of Peoria, Stark, and Marshall counties.

On February 11, 2021, Minority Leader Jim Durkin announced that Spain would be leading the House Republican Organization, the campaign arm of Republican candidates running for the Illinois House of Representatives, for the 2022 general election. He was reappointed to this role chairing the House Republican Organization in 2023. At the start of the 103rd Illinois General Assembly, newly installed Minority Leader Tony McCombie elevated Spain to serve as one of two Deputy Minority Leaders alongside Norine Hammond of Macomb.

As of July 3, 2022, Representative Spain is a member of the following Illinois House committees:

- Appropriations - Human Services Committee (HAPH)
- Business & Innovation Subcommittee (HLBR-BUIN)
- Ethics & Elections Committee (SHEE)
- Executive Committee (HEXC)
- Financial Institutions Committee (HFIN)
- Labor & Commerce Committee (HLBR)
- Prescription Drug Affordability Committee (HPDA)
- Redistricting Committee (HRED)
- Tourism Committee (SHTO)
