= Justin Slaughter =

American politician (born 1980)

Member of the Illinois House of Representatives from the 27th district
- Incumbent
- Assumed office January 5, 2017
- Preceded by: Monique D. Davis

Personal details
- Born: Justin Quincy Slaughter; April 24, 1980 (age 46) Chicago, Illinois, U.S.
- Party: Democratic
- Education: University of Chicago (BA); Northwestern University (MPP)
- Website: Official website

Justin Quincy Slaughter (born April 24, 1980) is an American politician and retired college basketball player. Slaughter has served as a Democratic member of the Illinois House of Representatives from the 27th district, which consists of portions of Chicago and neighboring communities.

As a legislator, Slaughter has advocated for criminal justice reform, and was a chief sponsor of the SAFE-T Act.

== Early life and education ==
Justin Quincy Slaughter was born April 24, 1980 in Chicago. Slaughter was raised in Washington Heights in Chicago's South Side. He attended the University of Chicago Laboratory Schools, a college preparatory school. Slaughter went on to attend the University of Chicago, where he played college basketball as a guard on the Maroons from 1998 to 2002.

Slaughter graduated with a degree in political science in 2002 and would later receive a master's degree in public policy and administration from Northwestern University.

== Career ==
Prior to holding elected office, Slaughter served as director of programs at the Illinois Department of Juvenile Justice. He was also an aide to Kwame Raoul during his time in the state senate.

=== Illinois House of Representatives ===
On January 3, 2017, Monique D. Davis announced she would decline to serve in the 100th General Assembly to which she was elected from the 27th district in the November 2016 general election. On January 5, 2017, the Democratic Representative Committee of the 27th Representative District appointed Justin Slaughter to fill the vacancy created by Davis's resignation. The 27th district, under the 2011-2021 apportionment, covered the Chicago neighborhoods of Washington Heights, Auburn Gresham, Beverly, Chatham, Morgan Park, Roseland, and West Pullman, as well as the cities of Alsip, Blue Island, Crestwood, Midlothian, Orland Park, Palos Heights, Robbins, and Worth.

==== Tenure ====
In office, Slaughter has been a supporter of criminal justice reform reforms. In his first year in office, Slaughter sponsored ultimately successful legislation that provided inmates with "training to develop skills for computers, public speaking and general business."

Slaughter was one of the lead sponsors of the SAFE-T Act (Safety, Accountability, Fairness and Equity-Today Act), which became state law in 2021. The legislation creates new standards for decertifying police officers who engage in misconduct, and eliminated the use of cash bail.

In January 2024, CWBChicago reported that Slaughter had "introduced legislation that would prohibit police officers across Illinois from stopping motorists for a host of violations, including expired plates, tinted windows, improper lane usage, and even speeding up to 25 mph over the posted limit."

==== Committee membership ====
As of July 3, 2022, Representative Slaughter is a member of the following Illinois House committees:

- Appropriations - Higher Education Committee (HAPI)
- (Chairman of) Criminal Administration and Enforcement Subcommittee (HJUC-CAES)
- (Chairman of) Firearms and Firearm Safety Subcommittee (HJUC-FIRE)
- International Trade & Commerce Committee (HITC)
- (Chairman of) Judiciary - Criminal Committee (HJUC)
- (Chairman of) Juvenile Justice and System-Involved Youth Subcommittee (HJUC-JJSI)
- Operations Subcommittee (HSGA-OEPR)
- Procurement Subcommittee (HSGA-PROC)
- Public Utilities Committee (HPUB)
- (Chairman of) Sentencing, Penalties and Criminal Procedure Subcommittee (HJUC-SPCP)
- (Chairman of) Sex Offenses and Sex Offender Registration Subcommittee (HJUC-SOSO)
- State Government Administration (HSGA)
- Water Subcommittee (HPUB-WATR)

==== Electoral history ====
Illinois 27th Representative District Democratic Primary, 2018
Party	Candidate	Votes	%
Democratic	Justin Q. Slaughter (incumbent)	10,917	54.55
Democratic	Tawana J. (T.J.) Robinson	9,095	45.45
Total votes		20,012	100.0

Illinois 27th Representative District General Election, 2018
Party	Candidate	Votes	%
Democratic	Justin Q. Slaughter (incumbent)	33,526	100.0
Total votes		33,526	100.0

Illinois 27th Representative District Democratic Primary, 2020
Party	Candidate	Votes	%
Democratic	Justin Q. Slaughter (incumbent)	20,194	99.99
Democratic	Marlo Barnett (write-in)	3	0.01
Total votes		20,197	100.0

Illinois 27th Representative District General Election, 2020
Party	Candidate	Votes	%
Democratic	Justin Q. Slaughter (incumbent)	41,616	100.0
Total votes		41,616	100.0

== Personal life ==
Slaughter lives with his wife and children in Brainerd Park, Chicago.
