= Bob Morgan (Illinois politician) =

American politician

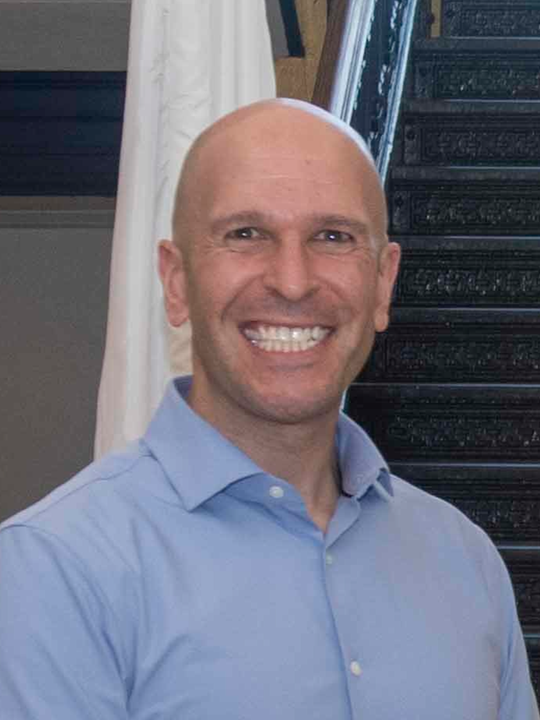
- Morgan at Naval Station Great Lakes in 2022

Member of the Illinois House of Representatives from the 58th district
- Incumbent
- Assumed office January 9, 2019
- Preceded by: Scott Drury

Personal details
- Party: Democratic
- Children: 2
- Education: University of Illinois (BA); Northern Illinois University (JD)
- Profession: Attorney

Bob Morgan is a lawyer and politician who currently serves as Assistant Majority Leader and Floor Whip in the Illinois House of Representatives. A Democrat, he represents House District 58, which covers the Chicago North Shore suburbs, including all or parts of Bannockburn, Deerfield, Glencoe, Highwood, Highland Park, Lake Bluff, Lake Forest, Lincolnshire, Northbrook, and North Chicago.

== Committee assignments ==
During the 104th Illinois General Assembly, Morgan served on the following Illinois House committees:

Committees

- (Chairman of) House Health Care Licenses Committee
- (Vice-Chairman of) House Insurance Committee
- House Appropriations – Health and Human Services Committee
- House Elementary & Secondary Education: Administration, Licensing & Charter Schools
- House Gun Violence Prevention Committee
- House Judiciary – Criminal Committee
- House Mental Health & Addiction Committee

Subcommittees

- (Sub-Co-Chairman of) House Insurance Main Subcommittee
- House Healthcare AI Subcommittee
- House Insurance Policy Subcommittee
- House Teacher Policy & Research Subcommittee
- House Weapons and Weapon Safety Subcommittee

== Early life and education ==
Morgan earned a bachelor's degree in political science from the University of Illinois at Urbana-Champaign, followed by a Juris Doctor from Northern Illinois University College of Law.

== House of Representatives ==
=== Opposition to Michael Madigan ===
In November 2020, Morgan joined 18 other legislators in opposing the reelection of Speaker Michael Madigan, citing allegations of corruption and misconduct involving Madigan and his aides. He publicly condemned the conduct of Madigan's top staff, who faced accusations of sexual harassment.

Following pressure in the House, Madigan ultimately resigned from the House in 2021, and in 2025 was convicted on 10 counts of bribery, conspiracy, wire fraud, and other corruption charges.

=== AI regulation ===
In 2025, Governor Pritzker signed Morgan's Wellness and Oversight for Psychological Resources Act into law, making Illinois the first state in the nation to prohibit AI therapists from providing direct patient care. The law, which received bipartisan support, mandates that all therapy services be conducted by qualified, licensed professionals.

Following the bill's passage, Morgan released a statement warning constituents of a lack of "guardrails" governing AI development: "By passing HB 1806, we are taking action to pause the unchecked expansion of AI in mental healthcare and putting necessary regulation in place before more harm is done."

== Appointments ==
In September 2024, Morgan was appointed to the Illinois Guardianship and Advocacy Commission, where he helps safeguard the rights of persons with disabilities by helping supervise the development of Illinois' public guardianship services.

== Personal life ==
Morgan lives in Deerfield, Illinois, with his wife, two children, and their two dogs.

== Awards ==
- Decalogue Society of Lawyers 2026 Solidarity Awards Honoree.
- Northern Illinois University College of Law 2023 Public Service Award.
- 2020 Chicago Daily Law Bulletin & Chicago Lawyer 40 Under Forty honorees.

== Electoral history ==
Illinois 58th State House District General Election, 2018
Party	Candidate	Votes	%
Democratic	Bob Morgan	29,974	63.81
Republican	Fredric Bryan "Rick" Lesser	16,998	36.19
Total votes		46,972	100.0

Illinois 58th State House District General Election, 2020
Party	Candidate	Votes	%
Democratic	Bob Morgan (incumbent)	43,648	100
Total votes		43,648	100.0

Illinois 58th State House District General Election, 2022
Party	Candidate	Votes	%
Democratic	Bob Morgan	31,269	70.22
Republican	Mike Clark	13,260	29.78
Total votes		44,529	100.0

Illinois 58th State House District General Election, 2024
Party	Candidate	Votes	%
Democratic	Bob Morgan	37,111	67.9
Republican	Carl Lambrecht	17,539	32.1
Total votes		54,650	100.0
