= Tony McCombie =

American politician

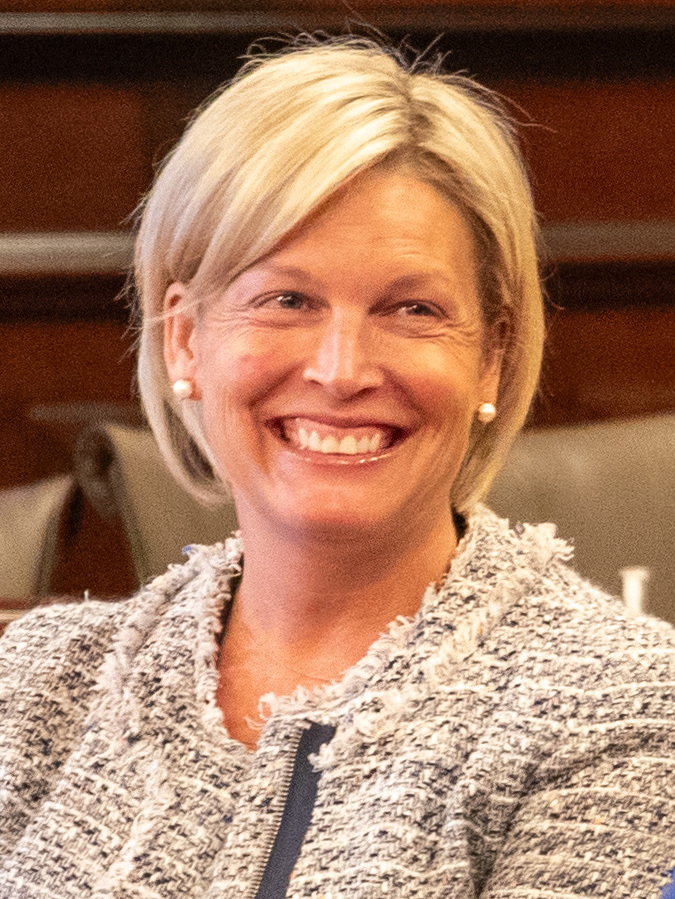
- McCombie in 2025

Minority Leader of the Illinois House of Representatives
- Incumbent
- Assumed office January 11, 2023
- Preceded by: Jim Durkin

Member of the Illinois House of Representatives
- Incumbent
- Assumed office January 11, 2017
- Preceded by: Mike Smiddy
- Constituency: 71st (2017-2023); 89th (2023-)

Personal details
- Born: October 9, 1972 (age 54) Savanna, Illinois, U.S.
- Party: Republican
- Spouse: Curt Hockman
- Education: Western Illinois University (BA); University of Illinois, Chicago (MPA)
- Website: District website State House website

Tony McCombie (born October 9, 1972) is an American realtor, politician, and the Republican Minority Leader of the Illinois House of Representatives. She represents the 89th district. The 89th district consists of all or parts of Carroll, DeKalb, Jo Daviess, Ogle, Stephenson, Winnebago counties in northwestern Illinois. A member of the Illinois House since 2017, she represented the 71st district prior to the 2021 decennial redistricting.

Prior to her election to Illinois House, McCombie served as Mayor of Savanna, Illinois, and as a Savanna Councilwoman.

== Illinois House of Representatives ==
=== Elections ===
McCombie first ran for the 71st District seat in the Illinois House of Representatives in 2016. After an uncontested Republican primary, McCombie faced off against incumbent Democratic nominee Mike Smiddy in the 2016 general election. In the election, McCombie defeated Smiddy with 63% of the vote.

McCombie won re-election to the seat in 2018, 2020, and 2022.

The Illinois House Republican Caucus appointed McCombie to lead its campaign arm for the 2020 general election.

Under McCombie's leadership, the GOP failed to pick up a single seat during the 2024 election cycle despite Donald Trump outperforming his 2020 numbers in Illinois.

=== Minority leader ===
On November 15, 2022, McCombie was elected to succeed Jim Durkin as Illinois House Minority Leader by a vote of 31-8. Durkin had stepped down after leading the Republican Party through the 2022 Illinois House of Representatives election, which saw the party lose a number of seats in the chamber. McCombie became House Minority Leader on January 11, 2023. She is the first woman to lead the House Republican caucus.

McCombie named Norine Hammond and Ryan Spain as Deputy Minority Leaders.

=== Legislation ===
Since first being elected as state representative in 2016, McCombie has been the primary sponsor on several bills that have gone on to become law in Illinois. This includes HB1927, which created the Experimental Aircraft Association Fund as a special fund in the state treasury, and HB1928, which allowed the issuance of Child Abuse Council of the Quad Cities special license plate decals by the Illinois Department of Human Services.

=== Committees ===
As of 2022, McCombie serves on five committees and four subcommittees:

- Restorative Justice committee (Republican Spokesperson)
- Public Utilities committee
- Judiciary - Criminal committee
- Insurance committee
- Elementary & Secondary Education: School Curriculum & Policies committee
- Juvenile Justice and System Involved Youth subcommittee
- Criminal Administration and Enforcement subcommittee
- Sex Offenses and Sex Offender Registry subcommittee
- Utilities subcommittee.

== Personal life ==
McCombie resides in Savanna, Illinois, with her husband, Curt. The couple have been married since 2006. Outside of her role in the Illinois House of Representatives, McCombie owns and operates Blue Appraisals and is self-employed as a realtor with Mel Foster Company.

== Electoral history ==
Illinois 71st State House District Republican Primary, 2016
Party	Candidate	Votes	%
Republican	Tony McCombie	10,624	100.00
Total votes		10,624	100.0

Illinois 71st State House District General Election, 2016
Party	Candidate	Votes	%
Republican	Tony McCombie	30,635	62.88
Democratic	Mike Smiddy (incumbent)	18,082	37.12
Total votes		48,717	100.0

Illinois 71st State House District General Election, 2018
Party	Candidate	Votes	%
Republican	Tony McCombie (incumbent)	23,870	58.68
Democratic	Joan Padilla	16,805	41.32
Total votes		40,675	100.0

Illinois 71st State House District General Election, 2020
Party	Candidate	Votes	%
Republican	Tony McCombie (incumbent)	32,132	61.60
Democratic	Joan Padilla	20,031	38.4
Total votes		52,163	100.0

Illinois House of Representatives
Preceded by Jim Durkin	Minority Leader of the Illinois House of Representatives; 2023–present	Incumbent
