= Dwayne Andreas =

American businessman and farm industrialist

- Born: Dwayne Orville Andreas; March 4, 1918; Worthington, Minnesota, U.S.
- Died: November 16, 2016 (aged 98); Decatur, Illinois, U.S.
- Resting place: Potomac, Maryland, U.S.
- Other name: Soybean king
- Education: Wheaton College
- Occupations: Businessman; Former chairman, president Archer Daniels Midland
- Years active: 1947–1999
- Spouse: D. Inez Snyder (m. 1947; died 2012)
- Children: 3

Dwayne Orville Andreas (March 4, 1918 – November 16, 2016), was one of the leading farm industrialists of the 20th century. He was often called the Soybean King. He was former CEO and chairman of Archer Daniels Midland (ADM). Under his leadership he turned ADM into the largest processor of farm commodities in the United States.

== Early life ==
Andreas was born in Worthington, Minnesota, on March 4, 1918, to Ruben and Lydia (Stoltz) Andreas, who both descended from strict Mennonite families. He grew up mostly in Iowa (with siblings Albert, Lenore, Glen, Osborne and Lowell) and worked at his father's farm and later the family's feed and grain business. He attended Wheaton College in Illinois, but dropped out in his sophomore year after getting married. Andreas then went to work for a modest, family-owned food-processing firm in Cedar Rapids, Iowa. When Cargill bought the Cedar Rapids facility in 1945, Andreas joined the commodity firm, eventually becoming a vice president. Andreas resigned from Cargill in 1952, and continued in the vegetable oil business, eventually as an executive of the Grain Terminal Association.

== Business career ==
In 1965 Andreas purchased 100,000 shares of Archer Daniels for $3.3 million. Over the following years Andreas gradually increased his holding and his influence in the company, eventually becoming chief executive officer of ADM in 1971.

He is credited with transforming the firm into an industrial powerhouse. Under his leadership, ADM grew from 40 processing plants and about 3,000 employees in the Midwest to 274 processing plants with 23,000 workers around the world. Its soybean exports shot up from $1.5 billion to $7 billion. Andreas remained CEO until 1997, the year that Archer Daniels pleaded guilty to price-fixing and paid $100 million in fines. This scandal also sent his only son, Michael Andreas to prison. Michael was the anointed successor as Andreas started to devolve his power. It was his son who hatched the plan to create global cartels in citric acid and lysine. Andreas stepped down as chairman in 1999 and was succeeded by his nephew, G. Allen Andreas.

== Public service ==
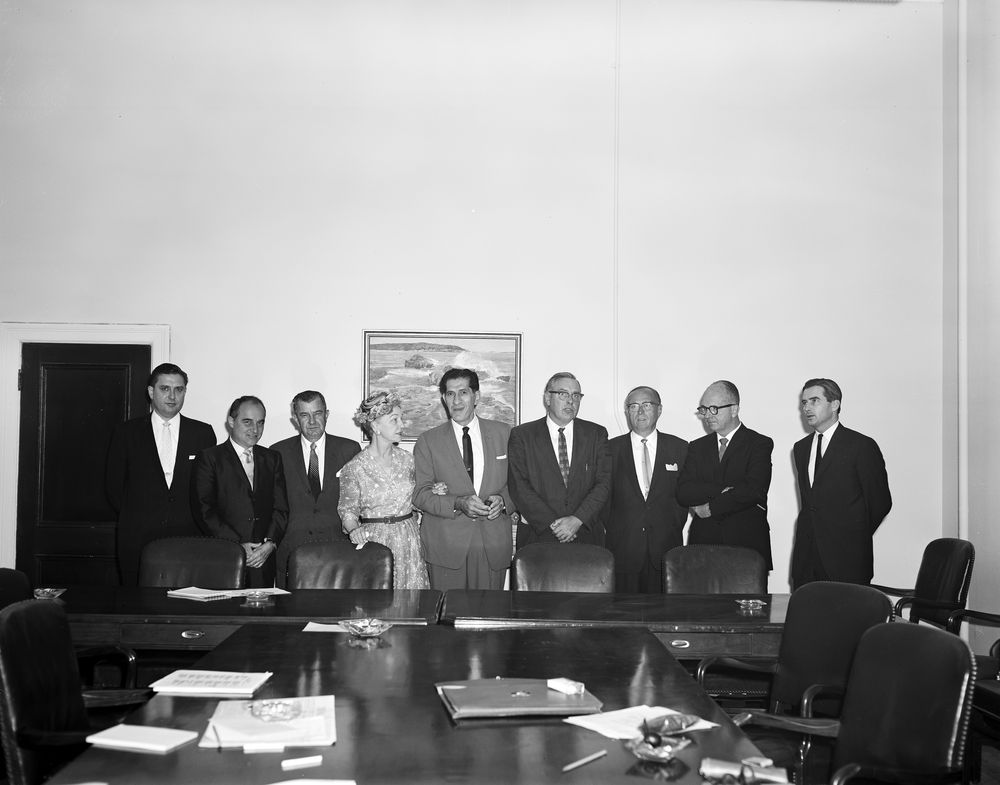
Andreas, second from left, at June 29, 1961, meeting of the Food For Peace Committee

Andreas served as an emissary for the Harry Truman administration and once secured a deal with President Juan Perón and wife Eva "Evita" Perón. In 1961, president John F. Kennedy appointed Andreas to the Food for Peace Committee. An account stated that Hubert Humphrey got him appointed to the committee as advisor to its director, George McGovern.

On March 26, 1965, president Lyndon B. Johnson appointed Andreas to The General Advisory Committee on Foreign Assistance Programs.

On May 2, 1983, President Ronald Reagan appointed Andreas chairman of the President's International Private Enterprise Task Force. This agency was tasked to advise the president, the director of the United States International Development Cooperation Agency, and the administrator of the Agency for International Development with respect to the role private enterprise can play in the implementation of programs and activities under the Foreign Assistance Act of 1961, as amended.

Andreas served as vice chairman of the Board of Trustees of the Woodrow Wilson International Center for Scholars.

In 1986 Andreas agreed, at the request of retired Chief Justice Warren E. Burger, to serve as head of the Foundation for the Commemoration of the United States Constitution which supported the work of the Commission on the Bicentennial of the United States Constitution.

In the 1990s he contributed $2.5 million to Florida public broadcasting network WXEL. He also aided the Community Partnership for the Homeless.

In 1997 Andreas donated $2.2 million to the Miami Homeless Assistance Center, saying "The one thing that is more gratifying than successfully making money is giving it away to a wonderful cause."

Andreas was one of several signatories to a May 20, 2004, open letter exhorting President George W. Bush to lift travel and humanitarian aid restrictions on Cuba. He is the namesake of Barry University's Dwayne O. Andreas School of Law.

== Awards and honors ==
- 1993 International Rescue Committee Freedom Award
- 1994 Horatio Alger Award
- 1994 National Agri-Marketing Association Agribusiness Leader of the Year

== Politics ==
Andreas was one of the most prominent political campaign donors in the United States, having contributed millions of dollars to Democratic and Republican candidates alike.

While not well known to the public, Andreas commanded much respect among Washington politicians for his largesse. As part of the investigations surrounding illegal campaign fundraising linked to the Watergate scandal, Andreas was charged with (but acquitted of) illegally contributing $100,000 to Hubert Humphrey's 1968 presidential campaign. In 1972, Andreas unlawfully contributed $25,000 to President Nixon's re-election campaign through the convicted Watergate burglar Bernard Barker. Other recipients of Andreas's "tithing" — as he puts it — have included George H. W. Bush, Jimmy Carter, Bill Clinton, Bob Dole, Michael Dukakis, Jesse Jackson, and Jack Kemp.

According to Mother Jones magazine:

During the 1992 election, Andreas gave more than $1.4 million in soft money and $345,000 to individual candidates, using multiple donors in his company and family members (including wife Inez) to circumvent contribution limits.

Andreas was implicated in the financial scandal of the Orthodox Church in America for his donations to Russia in 1991.

One of his closest friends was former New York governor and two-time Republican presidential candidate, Thomas E. Dewey. It was Andreas who discovered his friend following Dewey's fatal heart attack in his room at Seaview, a Florida hotel in which Andreas held partial ownership.

Andreas was portrayed by Tom Smothers in the 2009 film The Informant! about the lysine price-fixing conspiracy.

== Personal life ==
In 1935, at age 17, Andreas married Bertha Benedict in Florida. They had a daughter but subsequently divorced. In 1947, Andreas married Inez Snyder in Minneapolis, Minnesota. She was a single mother of a daughter. Andreas and Inez had a son Michael whose godfather was Hubert Humphrey. Humphrey was a friend and political mentor to Andreas. For many years they lived in the Decatur, Illinois, area and after retirement moved to Bal Harbour, Florida. Andreas died on November 16, 2016, in Decatur, Illinois, at the age of 98.

On January 26, 2022, Andreas' granddaughter Regan Deering, announced her candidacy for the newly formed Illinois's 13th congressional district. Deering lost the congressional race but in 2024 she was elected to the 88th Illinois House District.
