= 2022 United States House of Representatives elections in Illinois =

- November 8, 2022

All 17 Illinois seats to the United States House of Representatives
	Majority party	Minority party
Party	Democratic	Republican
Last election	13	5
Seats won	14	3
Seat change	▲1	▼2
Popular vote	2,271,361	1,768,782
Percentage	56.09%	43.68%
Swing	▼1.01%	▲2.55%

Democratic hold Democratic gain
Republican hold
Democratic
50–60%
60–70%
70–80%
90–100%
Republican
50–60%
60–70%
70–80%
80–90%

The 2022 United States House of Representatives elections in Illinois were held on November 8, 2022, to elect the 17 U.S. representatives from Illinois, one from each of the state's 17 congressional districts (reduced from 18 in the redistricting cycle following the 2020 United States census). The elections coincided with the 2022 U.S. Senate race in Illinois, as well as other elections to the House of Representatives, other elections to the United States Senate and various state and local elections. On November 23, 2021, Governor J. B. Pritzker signed the Illinois Congressional Redistricting Act of 2021, which established the new boundaries of the districts, into law. FiveThirtyEight ranked Illinois as the most gerrymandered Congressional map drawn by Democrats following 2022 redistricting.

== Results summary ==
=== Statewide ===
Popular vote
Democratic	56.09%
Republican	43.68%
Other	0.23%

House seats
Democratic	82.35%
Republican	17.65%

== District 1 ==
2022 Illinois's 1st congressional district election
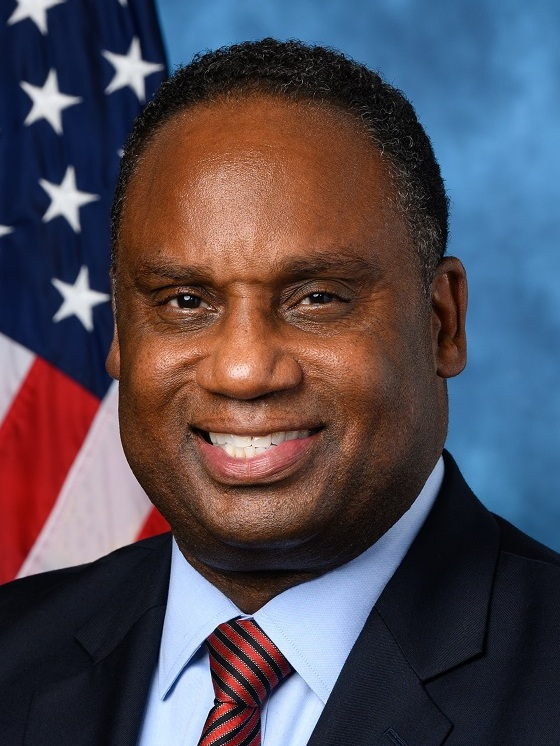

Nominee	Jonathan Jackson	Eric Carlson
Party	Democratic	Republican
Popular vote	159,142	78,258
Percentage	67.0%	33.0%
- Jackson: 50–60% 60–70% 70–80% 80–90% >90% Carlson: 50–60% 60–70% 70–80% No votes
U.S. Representative before election
Bobby Rush
Democratic
Elected U.S. Representative
Jonathan Jackson
Democratic

Before the 2020 redistricting cycle, the 1st district was primarily based in the South Side of Chicago. Under the new congressional map, although the 1st district is still based in Chicago, including portions of Bronzeville, Hyde Park, Grand Crossing, Morgan Park, and Roseland, it now reaches down to the southwest and takes in a collection of exurban and rural areas in Cook County, Will County, and Kankakee County. The former section is heavily black and the latter is heavily white; as a result, the district as a whole is slightly over 50% black. The incumbent was Democrat Bobby Rush, who was re-elected with 73.8% of the vote in 2020. On January 3, 2022, Rush announced that he would retire rather than seek a sixteenth term in office.

=== Democratic primary ===
==== Candidates ====
===== Nominee =====
- Jonathan Jackson, business professor; spokesperson for the Rainbow/PUSH coalition and son of Jesse Jackson

===== Eliminated in primary =====
- Kirby Birgans, educator and advocate
- Chris Butler, pastor
- Jahmal Cole, founder of My Block, My Hood, My City
- Jacqueline Collins, state senator
- Steven DeJoie, consultant and restaurateur
- Pat Dowell, Chicago City Council member
- Cassandra Goodrum, professor of Criminal Justice at Chicago State University
- Marcus Lewis, minister
- Ameena Matthews, anti-violence activist, subject of The Interrupters, and candidate for this district in 2020
- Karin Norington-Reaves, attorney and CEO of the Chicago Cook Workforce Partnership
- Robert Palmer, educator
- Terre Layng Rosner, professor of Communication at the University of St. Francis
- Jonathan Swain, businessman and former chair of the Chicago Zoning Board of Appeals
- Michael Thompson, educator
- Charise Williams, former deputy director of the Illinois Criminal Justice Information Authority

==== Results ====
Results by county: Jackson—30–40% Norington-Reaves—20–30% Collins—10–20%

Democratic primary results
Party	Candidate	Votes	%
Democratic	Jonathan Jackson	21,607	28.2
Democratic	Pat Dowell	14,594	19.0
Democratic	Karin Norington-Reaves	10,825	14.1
Democratic	Jacqueline Collins	9,299	12.1
Democratic	Chris Butler	4,141	5.4
Democratic	Jahmal Cole	4,045	5.3
Democratic	Jonathan Swain	2,554	3.3
Democratic	Michael Thompson	1,680	2.2
Democratic	Charise A. Williams	1,601	2.1
Democratic	Cassandra Goodrum	1,422	1.9
Democratic	Marcus Lewis	901	1.2
Democratic	Robert Palmer	899	1.2
Democratic	Nykea Pippion McGriff	892	1.2
Democratic	Terre Layng Rosner	780	1.0
Democratic	Ameena Matthews	686	0.9
Democratic	Kirby Birgans	511	0.7
Democratic	Steven DeJoie	251	0.3
Total votes		76,688	100.0

=== Republican primary ===
==== Candidates ====
===== Nominee =====
- Eric Carlson, Army veteran

===== Eliminated in primary =====
- Jeff Regnier
- Philanise White
- Geno Young, musician

==== Results ====
Results by county: Carlson—40–50% Regnier—40–50%

Republican primary results
Party	Candidate	Votes	%
Republican	Eric Carlson	10,755	40.5
Republican	Jeff Regnier	10,375	39.0
Republican	Geno Young	3,853	14.5
Republican	Philanise White	1,598	6.0
Total votes		26,581	100.0

==== Results ====
2022 Illinois's 1st congressional district election
Party	Candidate	Votes	%
Democratic	Jonathan Jackson	159,142	67.0
Republican	Eric Carlson	78,258	33.0
Write-in		25	0.0
Total votes		237,425	100.0
Democratic hold			

== District 2 ==
2022 Illinois's 2nd congressional district election
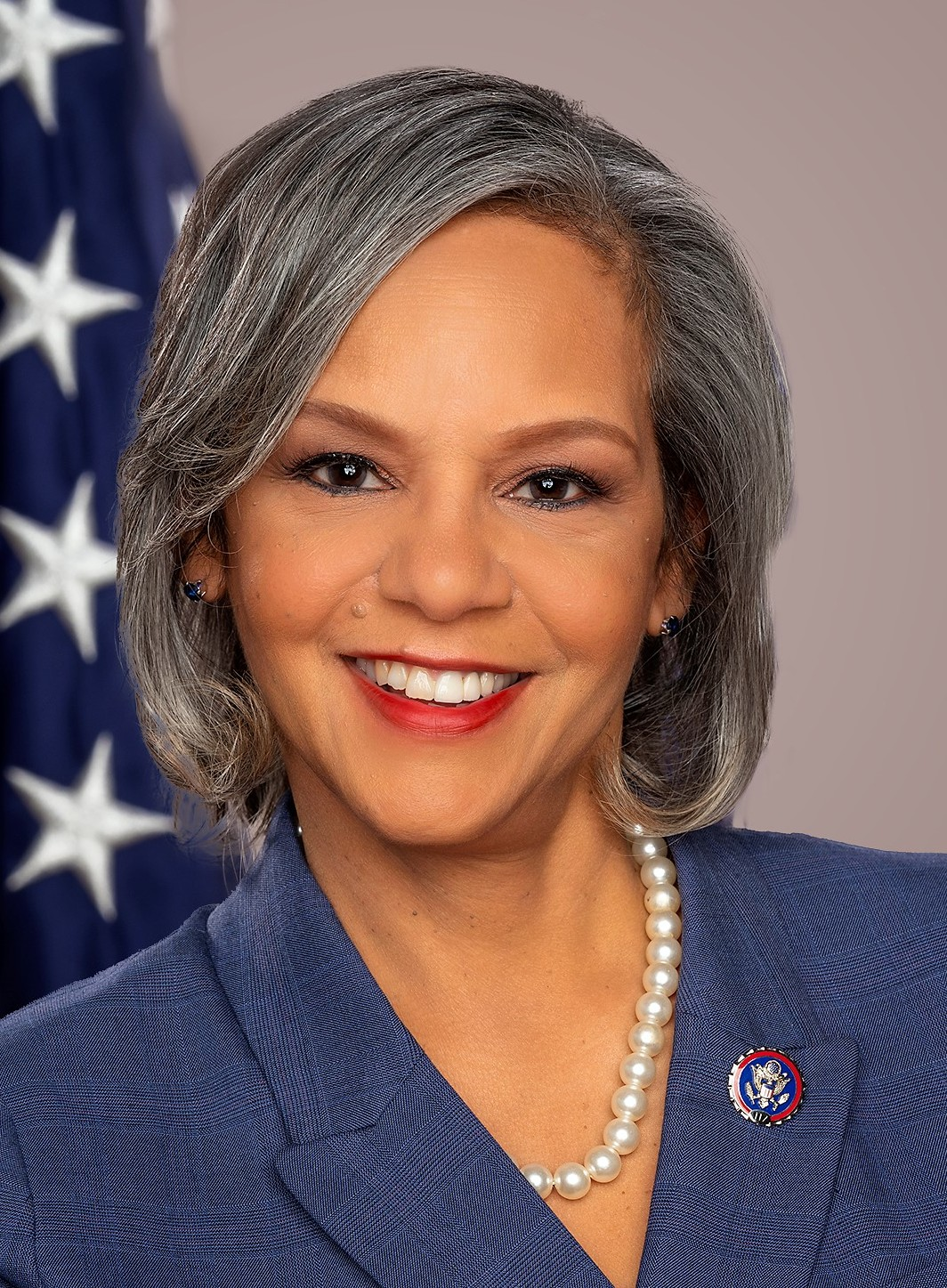

Nominee	Robin Kelly	Thomas Lynch
Party	Democratic	Republican
Popular vote	140,414	68,761
Percentage	67.1%	32.9%
- Kelly: 50–60% 60–70% 70–80% 80–90% >90% Lynch: 50–60% 60–70% 70–80% 80–90% >90%
U.S. Representative before election
Robin Kelly
Democratic
Elected U.S. Representative
Robin Kelly
Democratic

The incumbent was Democrat Robin Kelly, who was re-elected with 78.8% of the vote in 2020.

=== Democratic primary ===
==== Candidates ====
===== Nominee =====
- Robin Kelly, incumbent U.S. representative

==== Endorsements ====
Robin Kelly

Organizations

- Feminist Majority PAC
- Illinois AFL–CIO
- International Union of Operating Engineers Local 150
- Planned Parenthood Action Fund

==== Results ====
Democratic primary results
Party	Candidate	Votes	%
Democratic	Robin Kelly (incumbent)	56,606	100.0
Total votes		56,606	100.0

=== Republican primary ===
==== Nominee ====
- Thomas Lynch, former Iroquois County Board member

===== Eliminated in primary =====
- Shane Cultra, former state senator (2011–2013)
- Ashley Ramos

==== Results ====
Results by county: Lynch—40–50% Lynch—30–40% Cultra—60–70% Cultra—50–60% Cultra—40–50%

Republican primary results
Party	Candidate	Votes	%
Republican	Thomas Lynch	10,289	37.2
Republican	Shane Cultra	9,869	35.7
Republican	Ashley Ramos	7,524	27.2
Total votes		27,682	100.0

=== General election ===
==== Predictions ====
Source	Ranking	As of
The Cook Political Report	Solid D	November 30, 2021
Inside Elections	Solid D	January 28, 2022
Sabato's Crystal Ball	Safe D	December 2, 2021
Politico	Solid D	April 5, 2022
RCP	Safe D	June 9, 2022
Fox News	Solid D	July 11, 2022
DDHQ	Solid D	July 20, 2022
538	Solid D	June 30, 2022
The Economist	Safe D	September 28, 2022

==== Results ====
2022 Illinois's 2nd congressional district election
Party	Candidate	Votes	%
Democratic	Robin Kelly (incumbent)	140,414	67.1
Republican	Thomas Lynch	68,761	32.9
Total votes		209,175	100.0
Democratic hold			

== District 3 ==
2022 Illinois's 3rd congressional district election
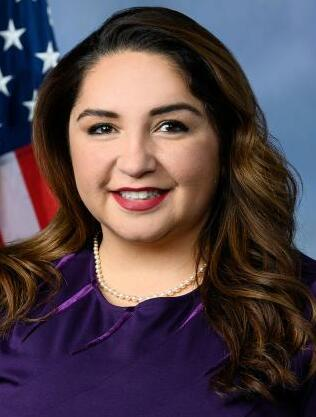

Nominee	Delia Ramirez	Justin Burau
Party	Democratic	Republican
Popular vote	121,764	55,995
Percentage	68.5%	31.5%
- Ramirez: 50–60% 60–70% 70–80% 80–90% >90% Burau: 50–60% 60–70% 70–80% >90%
U.S. Representative before election
None
(new seat)
Elected U.S. Representative
Delia Ramirez
Democratic

During the 2020 redistricting process, the Illinois General Assembly decided to create a second Latino-influenced district. As such, the 3rd congressional district had no incumbent. The district is approximately 47% Latino and unites heavily Latino communities from Chicago to Elgin. Among potential voters, the communities in the district include 63.4% White, 25.2% Latino, 6.2% Black, and 4.7% Asian people. It includes parts of the Chicago neighborhoods of West Town, Logan Square, Humboldt Park, Belmont Cragin, Portage Park, Irving Park, Albany Park, Montclare, Dunning, and all or parts of the suburbs of Elmwood Park, River Grove, Franklin Park, Bensenville, Elk Grove Village, Wood Dale, Addison, Glendale Heights, Wheaton, West Chicago, Wayne, Bartlett, Hanover Park, and Elgin.

=== Democratic primary ===
==== Candidates ====
===== Nominee =====
- Delia Ramirez, state representative

===== Eliminated in primary =====
- Juan Aguirre
- Iymen Chehade, professor of history at the Columbia College of Chicago and School of the Art Institute of Chicago
- Gilbert Villegas, Chicago City Council member

===== Declined =====
- Omar Aquino, state senator (endorsed Ramirez)

==== Endorsements ====
Delia Ramirez

U.S. senators

- Bernie Sanders, U.S. senator from Vermont (2006–)
- Elizabeth Warren, U.S. senator from Massachusetts (2013–)

U.S. representatives

- Chuy Garcia, U.S. representative from IL-04 (2019–present)
- Sylvia Garcia, U.S. representative from Texas's 29th congressional district (2019–)
- Pramila Jayapal, U.S. representative from Washington's 7th congressional district (2017–present)
- Mondaire Jones, U.S. representative from New York's 17th congressional district (2021–)
- Teresa Leger Fernandez, U.S. representative from NM-03 (2021–present)
- Alexandria Ocasio-Cortez, U.S. representative from New York's 14th congressional district (2019–)
- Lucille Roybal-Allard, U.S. representative from CA-40 (1993–present)
- Linda Sánchez, U.S. representative from California's 39th congressional district (2003–2013) and California's 38th congressional district (2013–)
- Jan Schakowsky, U.S. representative from IL-09 (1999–present)
- Lauren Underwood, U.S. representative from IL-14 (2019–present)

State officials

- Carol Ammons, state representative (since 2015)
- Omar Aquino, state senator (since 2016)
- Kam Buckner, state representative (since 2019)
- Kelly Cassidy, state representative (since 2011)
- Lakesia Collins, state representative (since 2020)
- Deb Conroy, state representative (since 2013)
- Barbara Flynn Currie, former state representative (1979–2019)
- Robyn Gabel, state representative (since 2010)
- Will Guzzardi, state representative (since 2015)
- Maura Hirschauer, state representative (since 2021)
- Lindsey LaPointe, state representative (since 2019)
- Theresa Mah, state representative (since 2017)
- Anna Moeller, state representative (since 2014)
- Cristina Pacione-Zayas, state senator (since 2020)
- Robert Peters, state senator (since 2019)
- Lamont Robinson, state representative (since 2019)
- Nick Smith, state representative (since 2018)
- Karina Villa, state senator (since 2021) and former state representative (2019–2021)
- Celina Villanueva, state senator (since 2020) and former state representative (2018–2020)
- Ram Villivalam, state senator (since 2019)
- Mark Walker, state representative (2009–2011; since 2019)

Local officials

- Daniel Biss, mayor of Evanston (since 2021), former state senator (2013–2019), and former state representative (2011–2013)
- Maria Hadden, Chicago City Council member for the 49th ward (since 2019)
- Daniel La Spata, Chicago City Council member for the 1st ward (since 2019)
- Carlos Ramirez-Rosa, Chicago City Council member for the 35th ward (since 2015)
- Rossana Rodriguez-Sanchez, Chicago City Council member for the 33rd ward (since 2019)
- Byron Sigcho-Lopez, Chicago City Council member for the 25th ward (since 2019)
- Jeanette Taylor, Chicago City Council member for the 20th ward (since 2019)
- Andre Vasquez, Chicago City Council member for the 40th ward (since 2019)

Individuals

- Clem Balanoff, national political director of the Amalgamated Transit Union and former state representative (1989–1995)

Labor unions

- Amalgamated Transit Union
- American Federation of Teachers Illinois
- American Nurses Association Illinois
- Chicago Teachers Union
- International Association of Fire Fighters Illinois
- International Association of Machinists and Aerospace Workers District Local 19
- Iron Workers Local 63
- SEIU Healthcare
- SEIU local 73
- Transportation Communications International Union
- UFCW Local 881

Organizations

- Congressional Progressive Caucus
- Democracy for America
- EMILY's List
- End Citizens United
- Giffords
- Indivisible
- J Street
- League of Conservation Voters Action Fund
- Our Revolution
- Peace Action
- People's Action
- Sierra Club
- Sunrise Movement Chicago
- United Working Families
- Working Families Party
Gilbert Villegas

U.S. representatives

- Ruben Gallego, U.S. representative from AZ-07 (2015–present)
- Luis Gutiérrez, former U.S. representative from Illinois's 4th congressional district (1993–2019)
- Brad Schneider, U.S. representative from IL-10 (2013–2015; 2017–present)

State officials

- Eva-Dina Delgado, state representative (since 2019)
- Susana Mendoza, Illinois comptroller (2016–)
- Jesse White, Illinois secretary of state (1999–)
- Kathleen Willis, state representative (since 2013)

Local officials

- Bridget Gainer, Cook County commissioner (since 2009)
- Iris Martinez, clerk of the Circuit Court of Cook County (since 2020) and former state senator (2003–2020)

Newspapers

- Chicago Tribune
- The Jewish Press

Organizations

- Democratic Majority for Israel
- International Association of Heat and Frost Insulators and Allied Workers Local 17
- International Union of Elevator Constructors Local 2
- Latino Leadership Council
- Latino Victory Fund
- New Politics
- Pro-Israel America
- Service Employees International Union Local 1
- United Steelworkers
- VoteVets.org

==== Polling ====
Poll source	Date(s) administered	Sample size (Note: Key: A – all adults RV – registered voters LV – likely voters V – unclear)	Margin of error	Juan Aguirre	Iymen Chehade	Delia Ramirez	Gilbert Villegas	Other	Undecided
Impact Research (D) (Note: Poll sponsored by Ramirez's campaign.)	March 14–17, 2022	400 (LV)	± 4.9%	0%	3%	25%	10%	–	62%
Impact Research (D)	March 14–17, 2022	400 (LV)	± 4.9%	–	–	28%	12%	–	60%
Lake Research Partners (WFP) (Note: Poll sponsored by the Working Families Party.)	February 28 – March 3, 2022	400 (LV)	± 4.9%	–	1%	19%	11%	3%	66%

==== Results ====
Democratic primary results
Party	Candidate	Votes	%
Democratic	Delia Ramirez	37,296	66.4
Democratic	Gilbert Villegas	12,990	23.1
Democratic	Iymen Chehade	3,719	6.6
Democratic	Juan Aguirre	2,175	3.9
Total votes		56,180	100.0

=== Republican primary ===
==== Candidates ====
===== Nominee =====
- Justin Burau, real estate consultant

==== Endorsements ====
Justin Burau

Individuals

- Dan Brady, Illinois state representative
- Evelyn Sanguinetti, former lieutenant governor of Illinois

==== Results ====
Republican primary results
Party	Candidate	Votes	%
Republican	Justin Burau	18,997	100.0
Total votes		18,997	100.0

=== General election ===
==== Predictions ====
Source	Ranking	As of
The Cook Political Report	Solid D	November 30, 2021
Inside Elections	Solid D	January 28, 2022
Sabato's Crystal Ball	Safe D	December 2, 2021
Politico	Solid D	April 5, 2022
RCP	Safe D	June 9, 2022
Fox News	Solid D	July 11, 2022
DDHQ	Solid D	July 20, 2022
538	Solid D	June 30, 2022
The Economist	Safe D	September 28, 2022

==== Results ====
2022 Illinois's 3rd congressional district election
Party	Candidate	Votes	%
Democratic	Delia Ramirez	121,764	68.5
Republican	Justin Burau	55,995	31.5
Total votes		177,759	100.0
Democratic win (new seat)			

== District 4 ==
2022 Illinois's 4th congressional district election
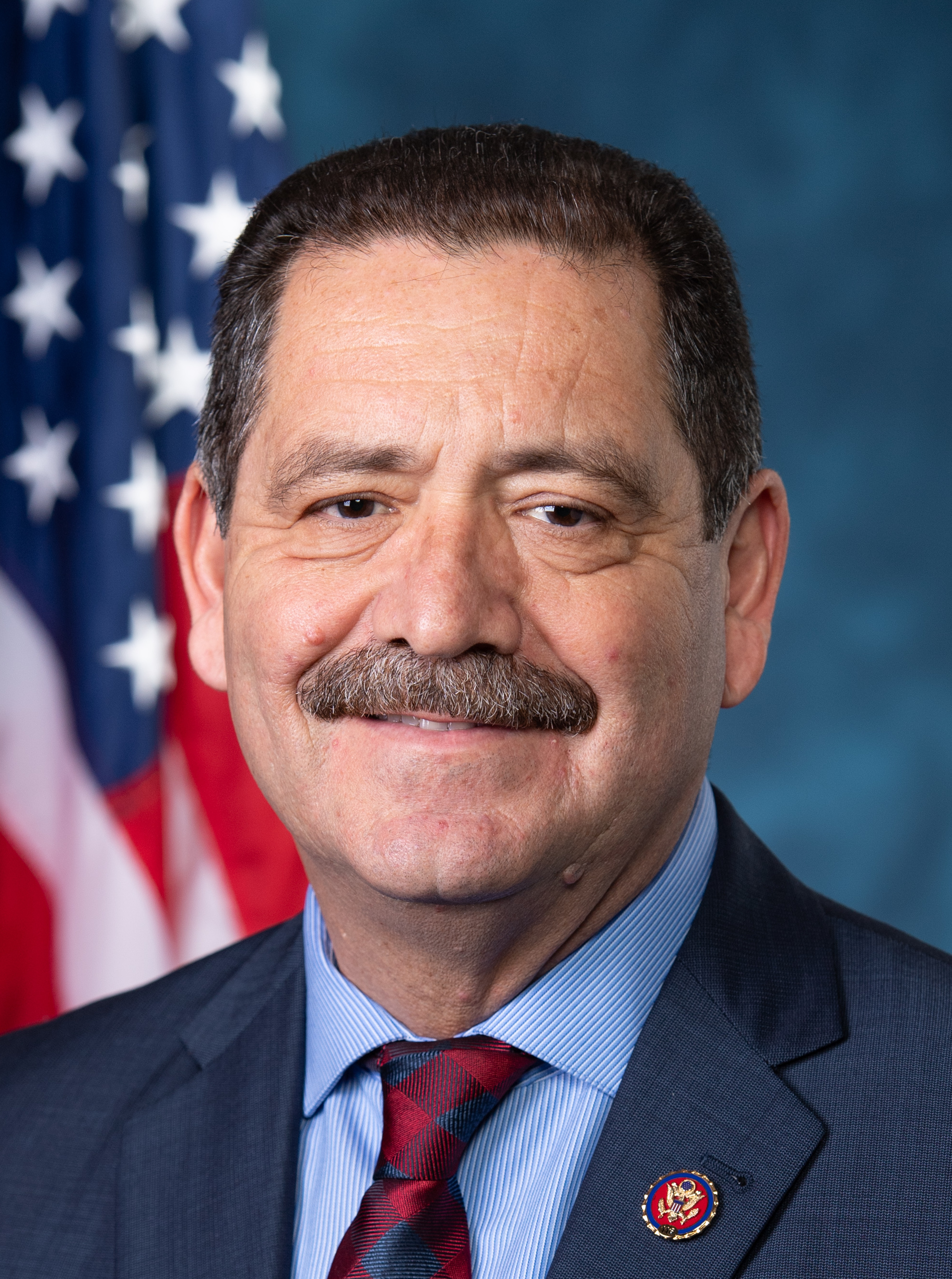

Nominee	Chuy García	James Falakos
Party	Democratic	Republican
Popular vote	91,036	37,352
Percentage	68.4%	28.1%
- García: 40–50% 50–60% 60–70% 70–80% 80–90% >90% Falakos: 40–50% 50–60% 60–70% No votes
U.S. Representative before election
Chuy García
Democratic
Elected U.S. Representative
Chuy García
Democratic

The incumbent was Democrat Jesús "Chuy" García, who was re-elected with 84.1% of the vote in 2020.

=== Democratic primary ===
==== Candidates ====
===== Nominee =====
- Jesús "Chuy" García, incumbent U.S. representative

===== Declined =====
- Marie Newman, incumbent U.S. representative (unsuccessfully ran in the 6th district)

==== Endorsements ====
Jesús "Chuy" García

Organizations

- Illinois AFL–CIO
- International Union of Operating Engineers Local 150
- Planned Parenthood Action Fund
- Progressive Democrats of America
- Sierra Club

==== Results ====
Democratic primary results
Party	Candidate	Votes	%
Democratic	Jesús "Chuy" García (incumbent)	37,499	100.0
Total votes		37,499	100.0

=== Republican primary ===
==== Candidates ====
===== Nominee =====
- James Falakos, businessman

==== Results ====
Republican primary results
Party	Candidate	Votes	%
Republican	James Falakos	12,192	100.0
Total votes		12,192	100.0

=== Working Class Party ===
==== Nominee ====
- Ed Hershey

=== General election ===
==== Predictions ====
Source	Ranking	As of
The Cook Political Report	Solid D	November 30, 2021
Inside Elections	Solid D	January 28, 2022
Sabato's Crystal Ball	Safe D	December 2, 2021
Politico	Solid D	April 5, 2022
RCP	Safe D	June 9, 2022
Fox News	Solid D	July 11, 2022
DDHQ	Solid D	July 20, 2022
538	Solid D	June 30, 2022
The Economist	Safe D	September 28, 2022

==== Results ====
2022 Illinois's 4th congressional district election
Party	Candidate	Votes	%
Democratic	Chuy García (incumbent)	91,036	68.4
Republican	James Falakos	37,352	28.1
Working Class	Edward Hershey	4,605	3.5
Write-in		54	0.0
Total votes		133,047	100.0
Democratic hold			

== District 5 ==
2022 Illinois's 5th congressional district election
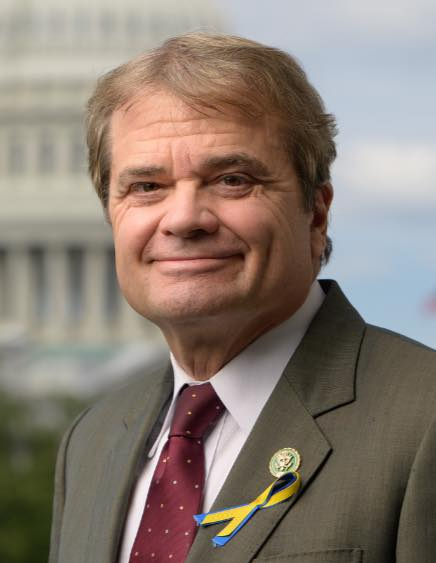

Nominee	Mike Quigley	Tommy Hanson
Party	Democratic	Republican
Popular vote	190,999	79,112
Percentage	69.6%	28.8%
- Quigley: 40–50% 50–60% 60–70% 70–80% 80–90% >90% Hanson: 40–50% 50–60% 60–70% 70–80% >90% Tie: 50% No votes
U.S. Representative before election
Mike Quigley
Democratic
Elected U.S. Representative
Mike Quigley
Democratic

The incumbent was Democrat Mike Quigley, who was re-elected with 70.8% of the vote in 2020.

=== Democratic primary ===
==== Candidates ====
===== Nominee =====
- Mike Quigley, incumbent U.S. representative

===== Removed from ballot =====
- Raleigh Bowman, manager

===== Withdrawn =====
- Hoan Huynh, entrepreneur and investor (running for state house)

==== Endorsements ====
Raleigh Bowman

Individuals

- Marianne Williamson, author and candidate for the Democratic nomination for president of the United States in 2020
Mike Quigley

Organizations

- Illinois AFL–CIO
- International Union of Operating Engineers Local 150
- Planned Parenthood Action Fund
- Sierra Club

==== Results ====
Democratic primary results
Party	Candidate	Votes	%
Democratic	Mike Quigley (incumbent)	82,490	100.0
Total votes		82,490	100.0

=== Republican primary ===
==== Candidates ====
===== Nominee =====
- Tommy Hanson, Republican nominee for IL-05 in 2008, 2018, and 2020

===== Eliminated in primary =====
- Malgorzata McGonigal

==== Results ====
Republican primary results
Party	Candidate	Votes	%
Republican	Tommy Hanson	14,806	55.4
Republican	Malgorzata McGonigal	11,916	44.6
Write-in		2	0.0
Total votes		26,724	100.0

=== Independents ===
- Jerico Matias Cruz, U.S. Army Special Operations combat veteran

=== General election ===
==== Predictions ====
Source	Ranking	As of
The Cook Political Report	Solid D	November 30, 2021
Inside Elections	Solid D	January 28, 2022
Sabato's Crystal Ball	Safe D	December 2, 2021
Politico	Solid D	April 5, 2022
RCP	Safe D	June 9, 2022
Fox News	Solid D	July 11, 2022
DDHQ	Solid D	July 20, 2022
538	Solid D	June 30, 2022
The Economist	Safe D	September 28, 2022

==== Results ====
2022 Illinois's 5th congressional district election
Party	Candidate	Votes	%
Democratic	Mike Quigley (incumbent)	190,999	69.6
Republican	Tommy Hanson	79,112	28.8
Independent	Jerico Matias Cruz	4,439	1.6
Total votes		274,550	100.0
Democratic hold			

== District 6 ==
2022 Illinois's 6th congressional district election
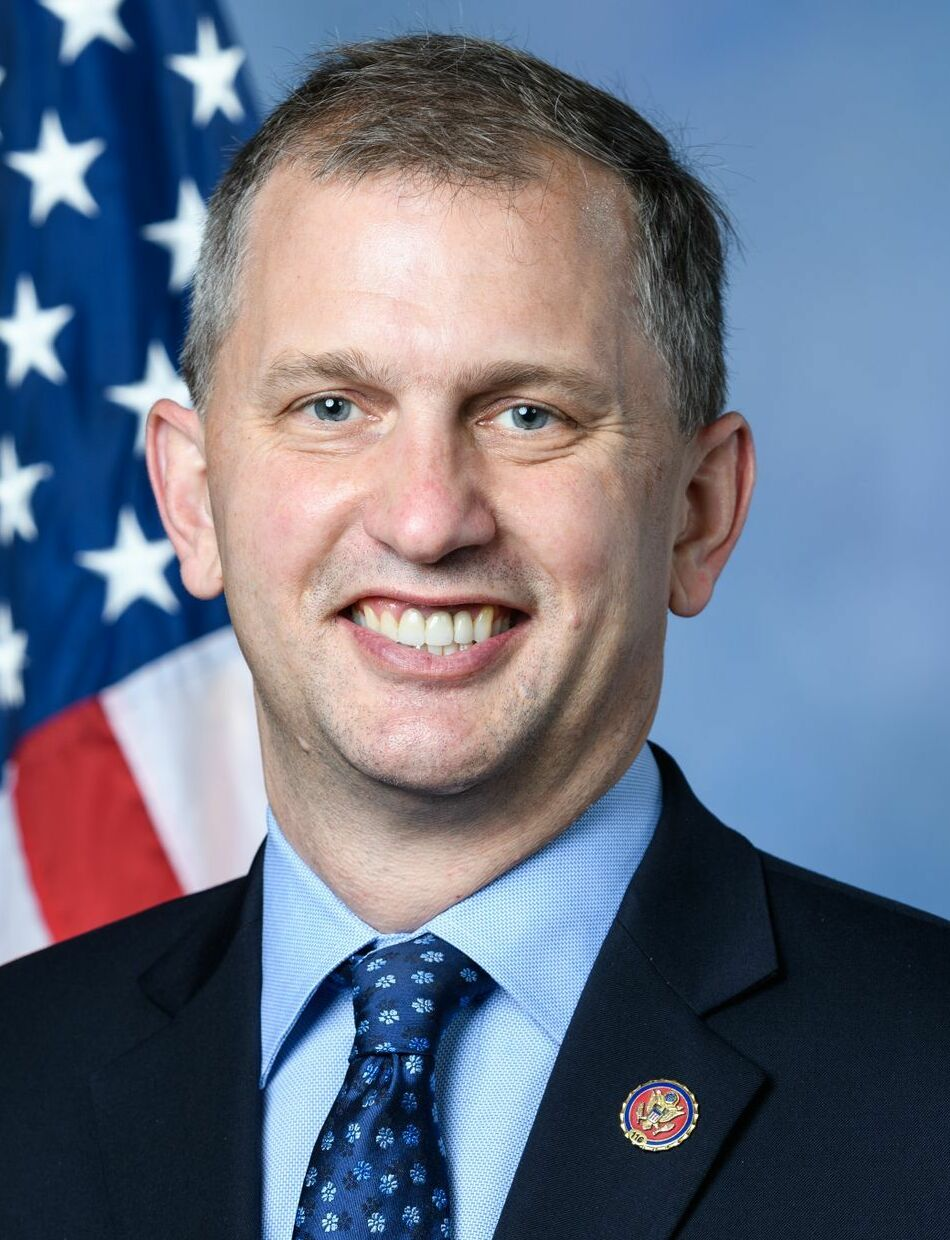

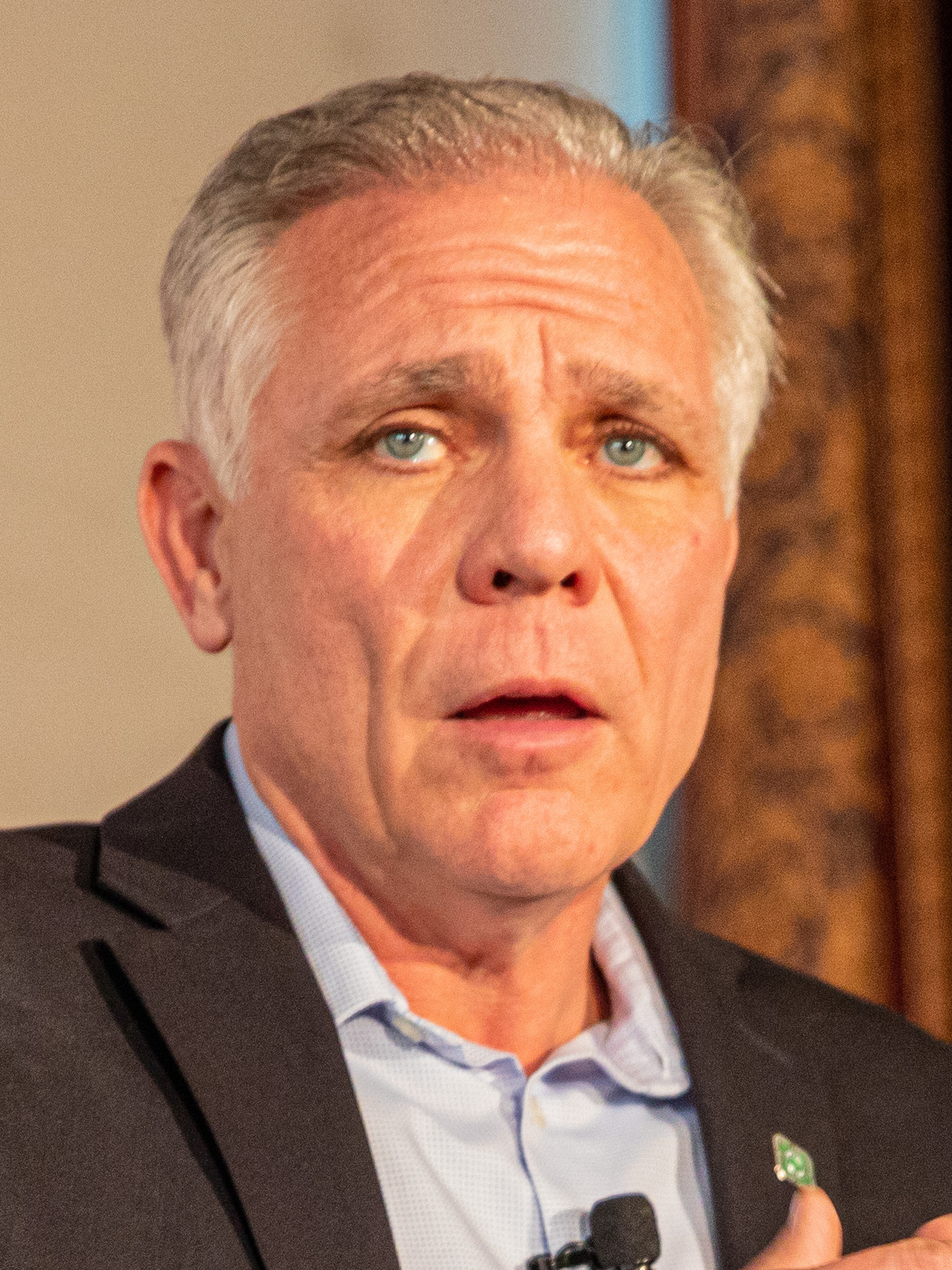
Nominee	Sean Casten	Keith Pekau
Party	Democratic	Republican
Popular vote	150,496	126,351
Percentage	54.4%	45.6%
- Casten: 50–60% 60–70% 70–80% 80–90% >90% Pekau: 50–60% 60–70% 70–80% Tie: 50%
U.S. Representatives before election
Sean Casten (Democratic)
Marie Newman (Democratic)
Elected U.S. Representatives
Sean Casten
Democratic

Due to redistricting, the borders of several districts in the Chicago area changed dramatically. 3rd District Incumbent Marie Newman was drawn into the Latino-majority 4th District. As a result, Newman decided to switch to the redrawn 6th district and announced that she would be running against 6th district incumbent Sean Casten. The new district contains about 40% of Newman's old district and about 25% of Casten's. In the opening stages of the campaign both Casten and Newman declared an intent to run on their legislative records, and declared that they would not campaign negatively against each other.

=== Democratic primary ===
==== Candidates ====
===== Nominee =====
- Sean Casten, incumbent U.S. representative

===== Eliminated in primary =====
- Charles Hughes, candidate for Illinois's 3rd congressional district in 2020
- Marie Newman, incumbent U.S. representative

==== Endorsements ====
Sean Casten

U.S. representatives

- Kathy Castor, U.S. representative from FL-14 (2007–present)
- Suzan DelBene, U.S. representative from WA-01 (2012–present)
- Bill Foster, U.S. representative from IL-11 (2008–present)
- Sylvia Garcia, U.S. representative from TX-29 (2019–present)
- Jahana Hayes, U.S. representative from CT-05 (2019–present)
- Jared Huffman, U.S. representative from CA-02 (2013–present)
- Derek Kilmer, U.S. representative from WA-06 (2013–present)
- Tom Malinowski, U.S. representative from NJ-07 (2019–2023)
- Donald McEachin, U.S. representative from VA-04 (2017–2022)
- Ed Perlmutter, U.S. representative from CO-07 (2007–present)
- Brad Schneider, U.S. representative from IL-10 (2017–present; 2013–2015)
- Maxine Waters, U.S. representative from CA-43 (1991–present)

State officials

- Laura Ellman, state senator
- Suzy Glowiak, state senator
- Terra Costa Howard, state representative
- Laura Murphy, state senator
- Suzanne Ness, state representative
- Janet Yang Rohr, state representative
- Anne Stava-Murray, state representative

Newspapers

- Daily Herald

Labor unions

- Illinois AFL–CIO (post-primary)
- International Brotherhood of Electrical Workers Local 701
- International Union of Painters and Allied Trades Local 30

Organizations

- 314 Action
- Democratic Majority for Israel
- J Street PAC (originally co-endorsement with Newman)
- League of Conservation Voters
- NARAL Pro-Choice America (co-endorsement with Newman)
- Natural Resources Defense Council
- Planned Parenthood Action Fund (co-endorsement with Newman)
- Sierra Club
Marie Newman

U.S. representatives

- André Carson, U.S. representative from IN-07 (2008–present)
- Peter DeFazio, U.S. representative from OR-04 (1987–present)
- Pramila Jayapal, U.S. representative from WA-07 (2017–present)
- Kai Kahele, U.S. representative from HI-02 (2021–present)
- Ro Khanna, U.S. representative from CA-17 (2017–present)
- Jackie Speier, U.S. representative from CA-14 (2013–present)
- Rashida Tlaib, U.S. representative from MI-13 (2019–present)
- Nydia Velázquez, U.S. representative from NY-7 (2013–present)

State officials

- Steven Landek, state senator (2011–present) and mayor of Bridgeview (1999–present)

Local officials

- Kathleen Carrier, DuPage County recorder
- Sheila Rutledge, member of the DuPage County Board
- Eira Corral Sepúlveda, member of the Board of Commissioners of the Metropolitan Water Reclamation District of Greater Chicago

Individuals

- Leah Greenberg, co-founder of Indivisible

Labor unions

- Amalgamated Transit Union Locals 308 and 241
- Brotherhood of Locomotive Engineers and Trainmen
- Brotherhood of Maintenance of Way Employes
- Brotherhood of Railroad Signalmen
- International Association of Machinists and Aerospace Workers (IAM) District Lodge 19, the railroad district
- Iron Workers Local 1
- National Association of Letter Carriers Branch 4016
- SEIU 32BJ
- Service Employees International Union Illinois State Council
- Sprinkler Fitters Local 281 UA
- Transport Workers Union Local 512
- Transportation Communications International Union
- United SteelworkersLocal 17U

Organizations

- Democracy for America
- EMILY's List
- Everytown for Gun Safety
- Feminist Majority
- Indivisible
- ~~J Street PAC (co-endorsement with Casten)~~ (rescinded co-endorsement)
- Justice Democrats
- NARAL Pro-Choice America (co-endorsement with Casten)
- National Organization for Women (NOW) PAC
- National Women's Political Caucus
- Our Revolution Illinois
- Planned Parenthood Action Fund (co-endorsement with Casten)
- Progressive Democrats of America

==== Polling ====
Poll source	Date(s) administered	Sample size	Margin of error	Sean Casten	Charles Hughes	Marie Newman	Undecided
Garin-Hart-Yang Research Group (D) (Note: Poll sponsored by Casten's campaign.)	May 12–16, 2022	402 (LV)	± 4.9%	36%	2%	27%	35%
Victoria Research (D) (Note: Poll sponsored by Newman's campaign.)	February 10–15, 2022	560 (LV)	± 4.4%	37%	–	37%	26%

==== Results ====
Results by county Casten: 50–60%; 80–90%

Democratic primary results
Party	Candidate	Votes	%
Democratic	Sean Casten (incumbent)	45,654	67.7
Democratic	Marie Newman (incumbent)	19,726	29.2
Democratic	Charles M. Hughes	2,085	3.1
Total votes		67,465	100.0

=== Republican primary ===
==== Candidates ====
===== Nominee =====
- Keith Pekau, mayor of Orland Park

===== Eliminated in primary =====
- Niki Conforti, businesswoman
- Rob Cruz, member of the Oak Lawn Community High School District 229 Board of Education
- Gary Grasso, mayor of Burr Ridge, candidate for Attorney General of Illinois in 2018
- Scott Kaspar, Orland Park attorney
- Catherine O'Shea, Oak Lawn real estate agent and candidate for Illinois's 3rd congressional district in 2020

===== Withdrawn =====
- Justin Burau, real estate consultant (running in the 3rd district)

==== Endorsements ====
Scott Kaspar

Organizations

- Illinois Family Institute

==== Results ====
Republican primary results
Party	Candidate	Votes	%
Republican	Keith Pekau	20,178	38.7
Republican	Gary Grasso	14,150	27.2
Republican	Niki Conforti	5,947	11.4
Republican	Catherine A. O'Shea	5,243	10.1
Republican	Scott R. Kaspar	3,573	6.9
Republican	Robert "Rob" Cruz	3,003	5.8
Total votes		52,094	100.0

=== Independents ===
==== Declined ====
- Dan Lipinski, former Democratic U.S. representative from Illinois's 3rd congressional district (2005–2021)

=== General election ===
==== Predictions ====
Source	Ranking	As of
The Cook Political Report	Lean D	November 1, 2022
Inside Elections	Likely D	February 18, 2022
Sabato's Crystal Ball	Lean D	November 2, 2022
Politico	Lean D	April 5, 2022
RCP	Tossup	June 9, 2022
Fox News	Lean D	July 11, 2022
DDHQ	Likely D	July 20, 2022
538	Lean D	October 26, 2022
The Economist	Likely D	September 28, 2022

==== Results ====
2022 Illinois's 6th congressional district election
Party	Candidate	Votes	%
Democratic	Sean Casten (incumbent)	150,496	54.4
Republican	Keith Pekau	126,351	45.6
Write-in		12	0.0
Total votes		276,859	100.0
Democratic hold			

== District 7 ==
2022 Illinois's 7th congressional district election
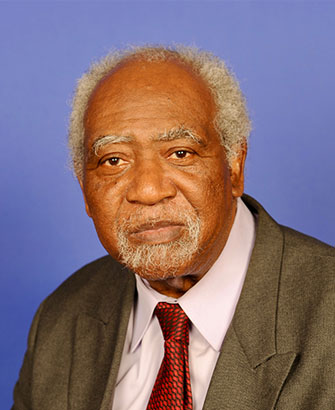
Nominee	Danny Davis
Party	Democratic
Popular vote	167,650
Percentage	99.9%
- County results Davis: 90–100%
U.S. Representative before election
Danny Davis
Democratic
Elected U.S. Representative
Danny Davis
Democratic

The incumbent was Democrat Danny Davis, who was re-elected with 80.4% of the vote in 2020. He was running for re-election.

=== Democratic primary ===
==== Candidates ====
===== Nominee =====
- Danny Davis, incumbent U.S. representative

===== Eliminated in primary =====
- Kina Collins, activist and candidate in 2020
- Denarvis Mendenhall, veteran and FDA investigator

==== Endorsements ====
Kina Collins

Local officials

- Byron Sigcho-Lopez, member of the Chicago City Council for the 25th ward (since 2019)

Organizations

- Democracy for America
- Indivisible
- Justice Democrats
- National Organization for Women
- Peace Action
- People's Action
- Sunrise Movement

Newspapers

- Chicago Tribune
Danny Davis

Federal officials

- Joe Biden, 46th president of the United States (2021–2025)

Statewide officials

- J. B. Pritzker, 43rd governor of Illinois (2019–present)
- Juliana Stratton, 48th lieutenant governor of Illinois (2019–present)

Local officials

- Fritz Kaegi, Cook County assessor
- Lori Lightfoot, Chicago mayor

Organizations

- Illinois AFL–CIO
- International Union of Operating Engineers Local 150
- J Street
- Planned Parenthood Action Fund
- Sierra Club

==== Results ====
Democratic primary results
Party	Candidate	Votes	%
Democratic	Danny Davis (incumbent)	39,230	51.9
Democratic	Kina Collins	34,574	45.7
Democratic	Denarvis Mendenhall	1,808	2.4
Total votes		75,612	100.0

=== General election ===
==== Predictions ====
Source	Ranking	As of
The Cook Political Report	Solid D	November 30, 2021
Inside Elections	Solid D	January 28, 2022
Sabato's Crystal Ball	Safe D	December 2, 2021
Politico	Solid D	April 5, 2022
RCP	Safe D	June 9, 2022
Fox News	Solid D	July 11, 2022
DDHQ	Solid D	July 20, 2022
538	Solid D	June 30, 2022
The Economist	Safe D	September 28, 2022

==== Results ====
2022 Illinois's 7th congressional district election
Party	Candidate	Votes	%
Democratic	Danny Davis (incumbent)	167,650	99.9
Write-in		96	0.1
Total votes		167,746	100.0
Democratic hold			

== District 8 ==
2022 Illinois's 8th congressional district election
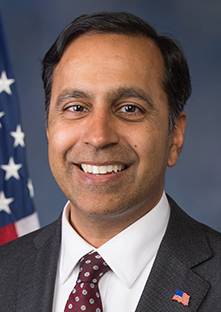

Nominee	Raja Krishnamoorthi	Chris Dargis
Party	Democratic	Republican
Popular vote	117,880	89,355
Percentage	56.9%	43.1%
- Krishnamoorthi: 50–60% 60–70% 70–80% 80–90% Dargis: 50–60% 60–70% Tie: 50% No votes
U.S. Representative before election
Raja Krishnamoorthi
Democratic
Elected U.S. Representative
Raja Krishnamoorthi
Democratic

The incumbent was Democrat Raja Krishnamoorthi, who was re-elected with 73.2% of the vote in 2020.

=== Democratic primary ===
==== Candidates ====
===== Nominee =====
- Raja Krishnamoorthi, incumbent U.S. representative

===== Eliminated in primary =====
- Junaid Ahmed, community activist

==== Endorsements ====
Junaid Ahmed

Organizations

- Progressive Democrats of America
Raja Krishnamoorthi

Organizations

- Illinois AFL–CIO
- International Union of Operating Engineers Local 150
- Planned Parenthood Action Fund
- Pro-Israel America
- Sierra Club

==== Results ====
Democratic primary results
Party	Candidate	Votes	%
Democratic	Raja Krishnamoorthi (incumbent)	29,933	70.3
Democratic	Junaid Ahmed	12,627	29.7
Total votes		42,560	100.0

=== Republican primary ===
==== Candidates ====
===== Nominee =====
- Chris Dargis, Ukrainian-American retired Navy officer and businessman

===== Eliminated in primary =====
- Karen Kolodziej
- Chad Koppie, former trustee of the Kane County Regional Board of Schools and perennial candidate
- Peter Kopsaftis, businessman and Barrington Township Republican committeeman
- Phillip Wood

==== Results ====
Republican primary results
Party	Candidate	Votes	%
Republican	Chris Dargis	11,055	32.0
Republican	Phillip Owen Wood	6,529	18.9
Republican	Peter Kopsaftis	6,101	17.6
Republican	Karen Kolodziej	6,017	17.4
Republican	Chad Koppie	4,886	14.1
Total votes		34,588	100.0

=== General election ===
==== Predictions ====
Source	Ranking	As of
The Cook Political Report	Solid D	November 30, 2021
Inside Elections	Solid D	January 28, 2022
Sabato's Crystal Ball	Safe D	December 2, 2021
Politico	Likely D	April 5, 2022
RCP	Likely D	June 9, 2022
Fox News	Solid D	August 22, 2022
DDHQ	Solid D	July 20, 2022
538	Solid D	June 30, 2022
The Economist	Safe D	September 28, 2022

==== Polling ====
Poll source	Date(s) administered	Sample size	Margin of error	Raja Krishnamoorthi (D)	Chris Dargis (R)	Other	Undecided
RMG Research	July 23–31, 2022	400 (LV)	± 4.9%	45%	39%	5%	12%

==== Results ====
2022 Illinois's 8th congressional district election
Party	Candidate	Votes	%
Democratic	Raja Krishnamoorthi (incumbent)	117,880	56.9
Republican	Chris Dargis	89,335	43.1
Total votes		207,215	100.0
Democratic hold			

== District 9 ==
2022 Illinois's 9th congressional district election
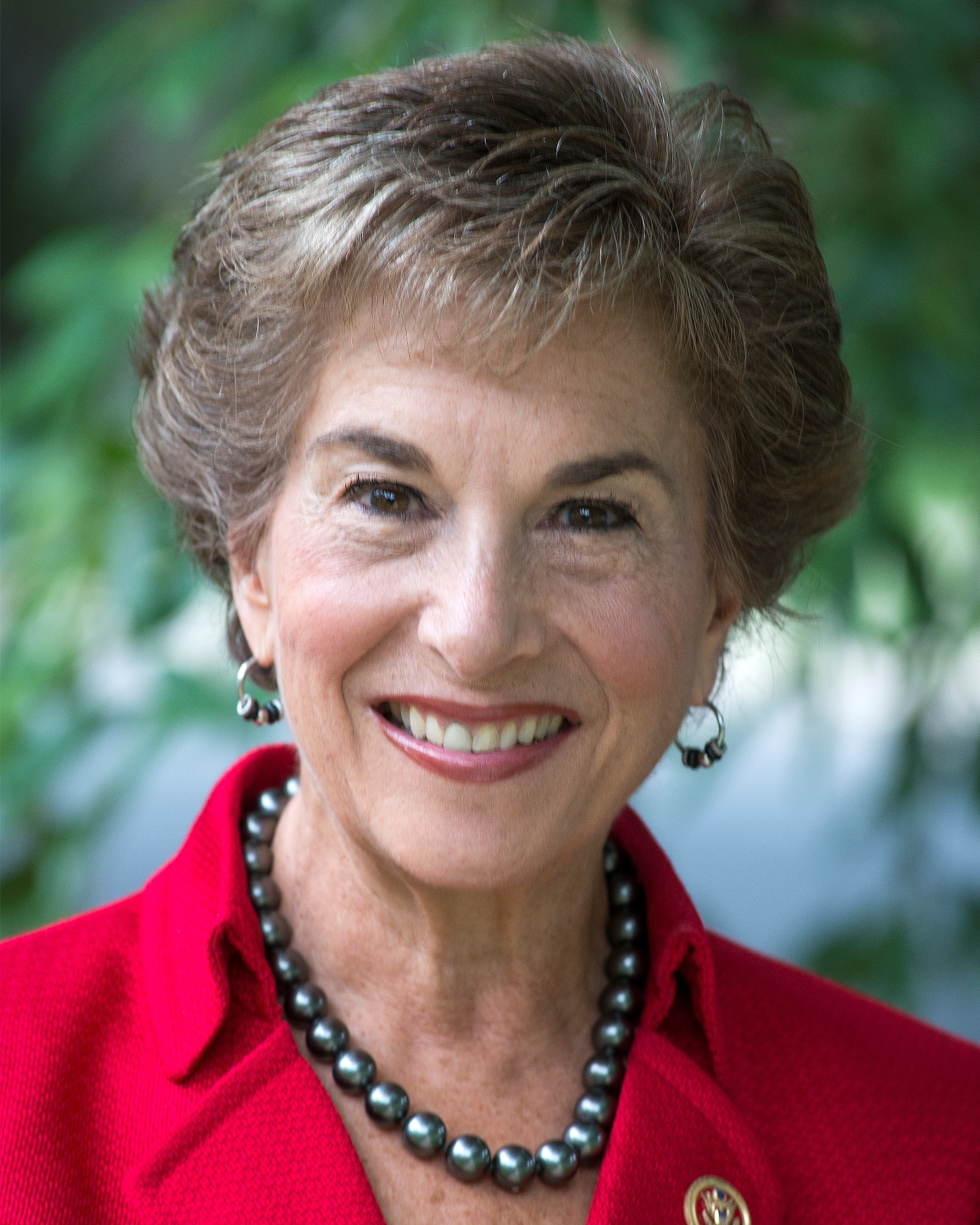

Nominee	Jan Schakowsky	Maxwell Rice
Party	Democratic	Republican
Popular vote	179,615	70,915
Percentage	71.7%	28.3%
- Schakowsky: 50–60% 60–70% 70–80% 80–90% >90% Rice: 50–60% 60–70%
U.S. Representative before election
Jan Schakowsky
Democratic
Elected U.S. Representative
Jan Schakowsky
Democratic

The incumbent was Democrat Jan Schakowsky, who was re-elected with 71.0% of the vote in 2020.

=== Democratic primary ===
==== Candidates ====
===== Nominee =====
- Jan Schakowsky, incumbent U.S. representative

==== Results ====
Democratic primary results
Party	Candidate	Votes	%
Democratic	Jan Schakowsky (incumbent)	76,956	100.0
Total votes		76,956	100.0

==== Endorsements ====
Jan Schakowsky

Organizations

- Feminist Majority PAC
- Illinois AFL–CIO
- International Union of Operating Engineers Local 150
- NARAL Pro-Choice America
- National Nurses United
- Planned Parenthood Action Fund
- Progressive Democrats of America
- Sierra Club

=== Republican primary ===
==== Candidates ====
===== Nominee =====
- Max Rice, candidate for IL-9 in 2018

==== Results ====
Republican primary results
Party	Candidate	Votes	%
Republican	Max Rice	22,751	100.0
Total votes		22,751	100.0

=== General election ===
==== Predictions ====
Source	Ranking	As of
The Cook Political Report	Solid D	November 30, 2021
Inside Elections	Solid D	January 28, 2022
Sabato's Crystal Ball	Safe D	December 2, 2021
Politico	Solid D	April 5, 2022
RCP	Safe D	June 9, 2022
Fox News	Solid D	July 11, 2022
DDHQ	Solid D	July 20, 2022
538	Solid D	June 30, 2022
The Economist	Safe D	September 28, 2022

==== Results ====
2022 Illinois's 9th congressional district election
Party	Candidate	Votes	%
Democratic	Jan Schakowsky (incumbent)	179,615	71.7
Republican	Max Rice	70,915	28.3
Total votes		250,530	100.0
Democratic hold			

== District 10 ==
2022 Illinois's 10th congressional district election
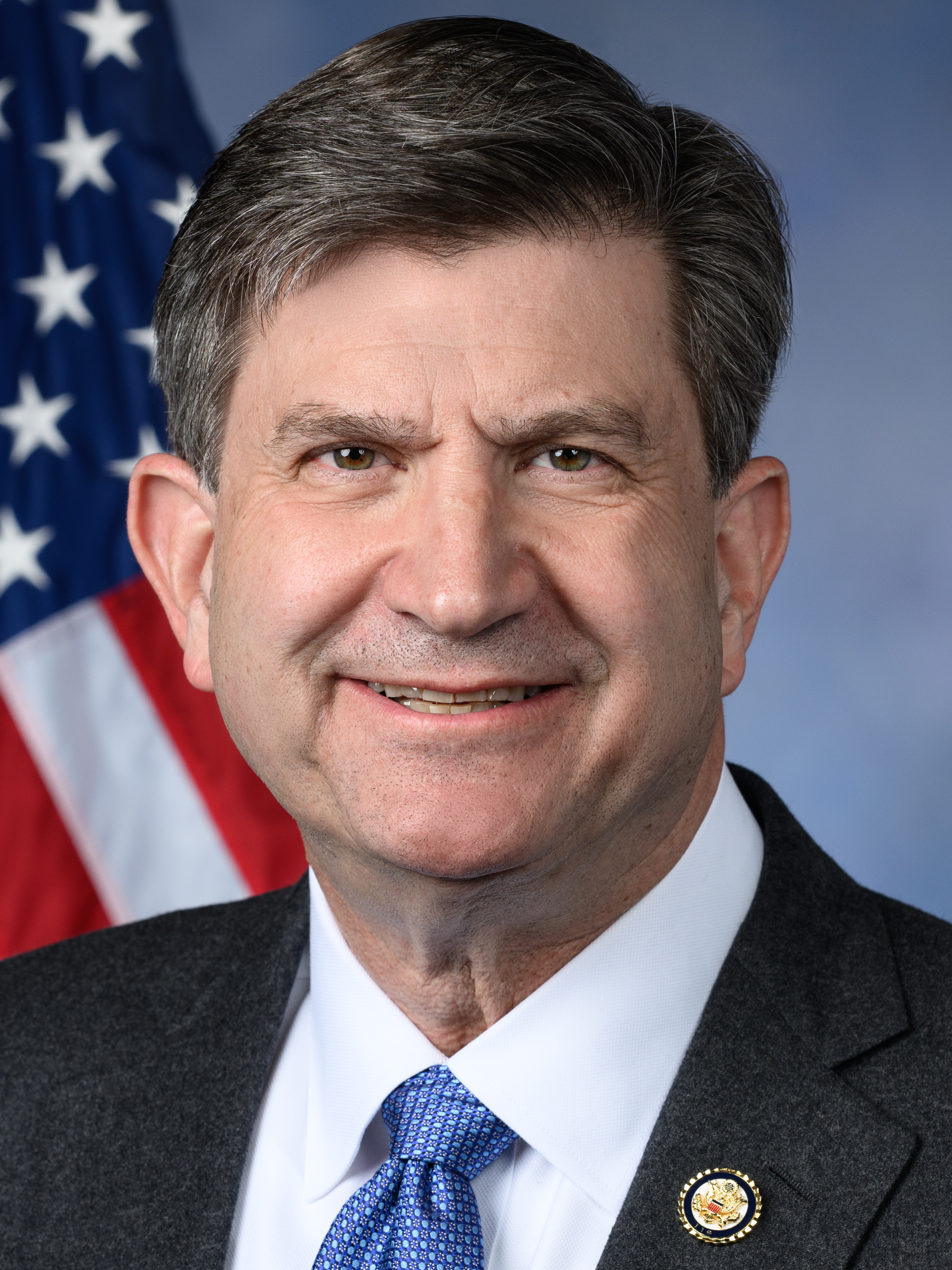

Nominee	Brad Schneider	Joseph Severino
Party	Democratic	Republican
Popular vote	152,566	89,599
Percentage	63.0%	37.0%
- Schneider: 50–60% 60–70% 70–80% 80–90% >90% Severino: 50–60% 60–70% Tie: 50% No votes
U.S. Representative before election
Brad Schneider
Democratic
Elected U.S. Representative
Brad Schneider
Democratic

The incumbent was Democrat Brad Schneider, who was re-elected with 63.9% of the vote in 2020.

=== Democratic primary ===
==== Candidates ====
===== Nominee =====
- Brad Schneider, incumbent U.S. representative

==== Endorsements ====
Brad Schneider

Organizations

- Illinois AFL–CIO
- International Union of Operating Engineers Local 150
- Planned Parenthood Action Fund
- Pro-Israel America
- Sierra Club

==== Results ====
Democratic primary results
Party	Candidate	Votes	%
Democratic	Brad Schneider (incumbent)	52,624	100.0
Total votes		52,624	100.0

=== Republican primary ===
==== Candidates ====
===== Nominee =====
- Joseph Severino, businessman

==== Results ====
Republican primary results
Party	Candidate	Votes	%
Republican	Joseph Severino	33,708	100.0
Total votes		33,708	100.0

=== General election ===
==== Predictions ====
Source	Ranking	As of
The Cook Political Report	Solid D	November 30, 2021
Inside Elections	Solid D	January 28, 2022
Sabato's Crystal Ball	Safe D	December 2, 2021
Politico	Solid D	April 5, 2022
RCP	Safe D	June 9, 2022
Fox News	Solid D	July 11, 2022
DDHQ	Solid D	July 20, 2022
538	Solid D	June 30, 2022
The Economist	Safe D	September 28, 2022

==== Polling ====
Poll source	Date(s) administered	Sample size	Margin of error	Brad Schneider (D)	Joseph Severino (R)	Undecided
Victory Research (R) (Note: Poll sponsored by Severino's campaign.)	October 1–4, 2022	600 (LV)	± 4.0%	48%	41%	11%

==== Results ====
2022 Illinois's 10th congressional district election
Party	Candidate	Votes	%
Democratic	Brad Schneider (incumbent)	152,566	63.0
Republican	Joseph Severino	89,599	37.0
Total votes		242,165	100.0
Democratic hold			

== District 11 ==
2022 Illinois's 11th congressional district election
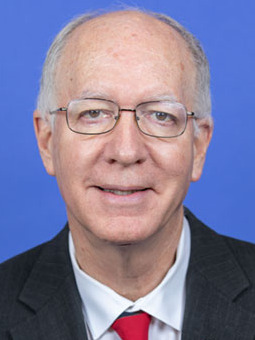

Nominee	Bill Foster	Catalina Lauf
Party	Democratic	Republican
Popular vote	149,172	115,069
Percentage	56.5%	43.5%
- Foster: 50–60% 60–70% 70–80% 80–90% Lauf: 50–60% 60–70% 70–80% Tie: 50% No votes
U.S. Representative before election
Bill Foster
Democratic
Elected U.S. Representative
Bill Foster
Democratic

The incumbent was Democrat Bill Foster, who was re-elected with 63.3% of the vote in 2020.

=== Democratic primary ===
==== Candidates ====
===== Nominee =====
- Bill Foster, incumbent U.S. representative

==== Endorsements ====
Bill Foster

State legislators

- Laura Ellman, state senator (post-primary)
- Suzanne Ness, state representative (post-primary)
- Janet Yang Rohr, state representative (post-primary)

Organizations

- Council for a Livable World
- Illinois AFL–CIO
- International Union of Operating Engineers Local 150
- League of Conservation Voters
- NARAL Pro-Choice America
- National Organization for Women PAC
- Natural Resources Defense Council
- Planned Parenthood Action Fund
- Sierra Club

==== Results ====
Democratic primary results
Party	Candidate	Votes	%
Democratic	Bill Foster (incumbent)	44,096	100.0
Total votes		44,096	100.0

=== Republican primary ===
==== Candidates ====
===== Nominee =====
- Catalina Lauf, former advisor at the U.S. Department of Commerce and candidate for Illinois's 14th congressional district in 2020

===== Eliminated in primary =====
- Mark Carroll
- Jerry Evans, music teacher
- Susan Hathaway-Altman
- Andrea Heeg
- Cassandra Tanner Miller, domestic violence advocate

===== Withdrew =====
- Juan Ramos

==== Endorsements ====
Mark Carroll

State representatives

- Jeff Keicher, state representative from the 70th district

Organizations

- Batavia Township Republican Party
- Illinois Family Institute
- Illinois Federation for Right to Life, state affiliate of the National Right to Life Committee
- Naperville Township Republican Party
Susan Hathaway-Altman

Newspapers

- Chicago Tribune
Catalina Lauf

U.S. senators

- Rand Paul, U.S. senator from Kentucky (2011–present)

U.S. representatives

- Madison Cawthorn, U.S. representative from North Carolina's 11th congressional district (2021–2023)
- Burgess Owens, U.S. representative from Utah's 4th congressional district (2021–present)
- Elise Stefanik, U.S. representative from New York's 21st congressional district (2015–present)

Organizations

- Elevate PAC
- New York Young Republican Club

==== Results ====
Republican primary results
Party	Candidate	Votes	%
Republican	Catalina Lauf	15,360	31.0
Republican	Jerry Evans	11,158	22.5
Republican	Mark Joseph Carroll	9,955	20.1
Republican	Susan L. Hathaway-Altman	6,017	12.1
Republican	Cassandra Tanner Miller	3,730	7.5
Republican	Andrea Heeg	3,334	6.7
Total votes		49,554	100.0

=== General election ===
==== Predictions ====
Source	Ranking	As of
The Cook Political Report	Likely D	April 27, 2022
Inside Elections	Solid D	January 28, 2022
Sabato's Crystal Ball	Likely D	December 2, 2021
Politico	Likely D	April 5, 2022
RCP	Likely D	June 9, 2022
Fox News	Likely D	July 11, 2022
DDHQ	Likely D	July 20, 2022
538	Solid D	September 29, 2022
The Economist	Likely D	September 28, 2022

==== Results ====
2022 Illinois's 11th congressional district election
Party	Candidate	Votes	%
Democratic	Bill Foster (incumbent)	149,172	56.5
Republican	Catalina Lauf	115,069	43.5
Total votes		264,241	100.0
Democratic hold			

== District 12 ==
2022 Illinois's 12th congressional district election
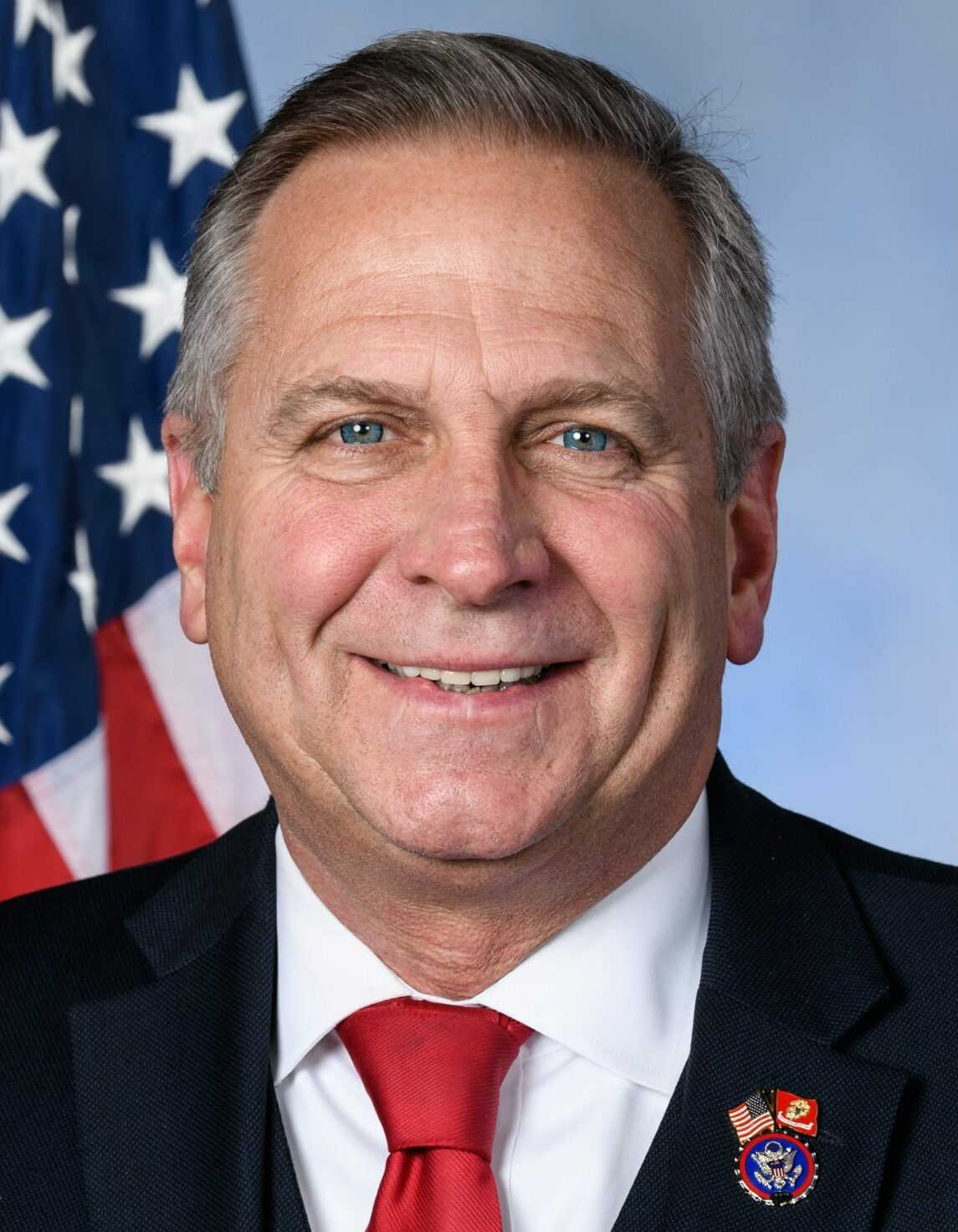

Nominee	Mike Bost	Chip Markel
Party	Republican	Democratic
Popular vote	218,379	72,791
Percentage	75.0%	25.0%
- Bost: 50–60% 60–70% 70–80% 80–90% >90% Markel: 50–60% 60–70% 70–80% 80–90% >90% Tie: 50%
U.S. Representatives before election
Mike Bost
Republican
Elected U.S. Representatives
Mike Bost
Republican

The incumbents were Republican Mike Bost, who was re-elected with 60.4% of the vote in 2020, and Republican Mary Miller, who was redistricted from the 15th Congressional District.

=== Republican primary ===
==== Candidates ====
===== Nominee =====
- Mike Bost, incumbent U.S. representative

===== Declined =====
- Mary Miller, incumbent U.S. representative (running in IL15)

==== Endorsements ====
Mike Bost

Federal officials

- Donald Trump, former president of the United States

Organizations

- Huck PAC

==== Results ====
Republican primary results
Party	Candidate	Votes	%
Republican	Mike Bost (incumbent)	88,681	100.0
Total votes		88,681	100.0

=== Democratic primary ===
==== Candidates ====
===== Nominee =====
- Chip Markel, U.S. Navy veteran

===== Eliminated in primary =====
- Joshua Qualls

==== Results ====
Results by county: Markel—70–80% Markel—60–70% Markel—50–60% Qualls—60–70% Qualls—50–60%

Democratic primary results
Party	Candidate	Votes	%
Democratic	Chip Markel	11,068	56.7
Democratic	Joshua Qualls	8,438	43.3
Total votes		19,506	100.0

=== General election ===
==== Predictions ====
Source	Ranking	As of
The Cook Political Report	Solid R	November 30, 2021
Inside Elections	Solid R	January 28, 2022
Sabato's Crystal Ball	Safe R	December 2, 2021
Politico	Solid R	April 5, 2022
RCP	Safe R	June 9, 2022
Fox News	Solid R	July 11, 2022
DDHQ	Solid R	July 20, 2022
538	Solid R	June 30, 2022
The Economist	Safe R	September 28, 2022

==== Results ====
2022 Illinois's 12th congressional district election
Party	Candidate	Votes	%
Republican	Mike Bost (incumbent)	218,379	75.0
Democratic	Chip Markel	72,791	25.0
Write-in		1	0.0
Total votes		291,171	100.0
Republican hold			

== District 13 ==
2022 Illinois's 13th congressional district election
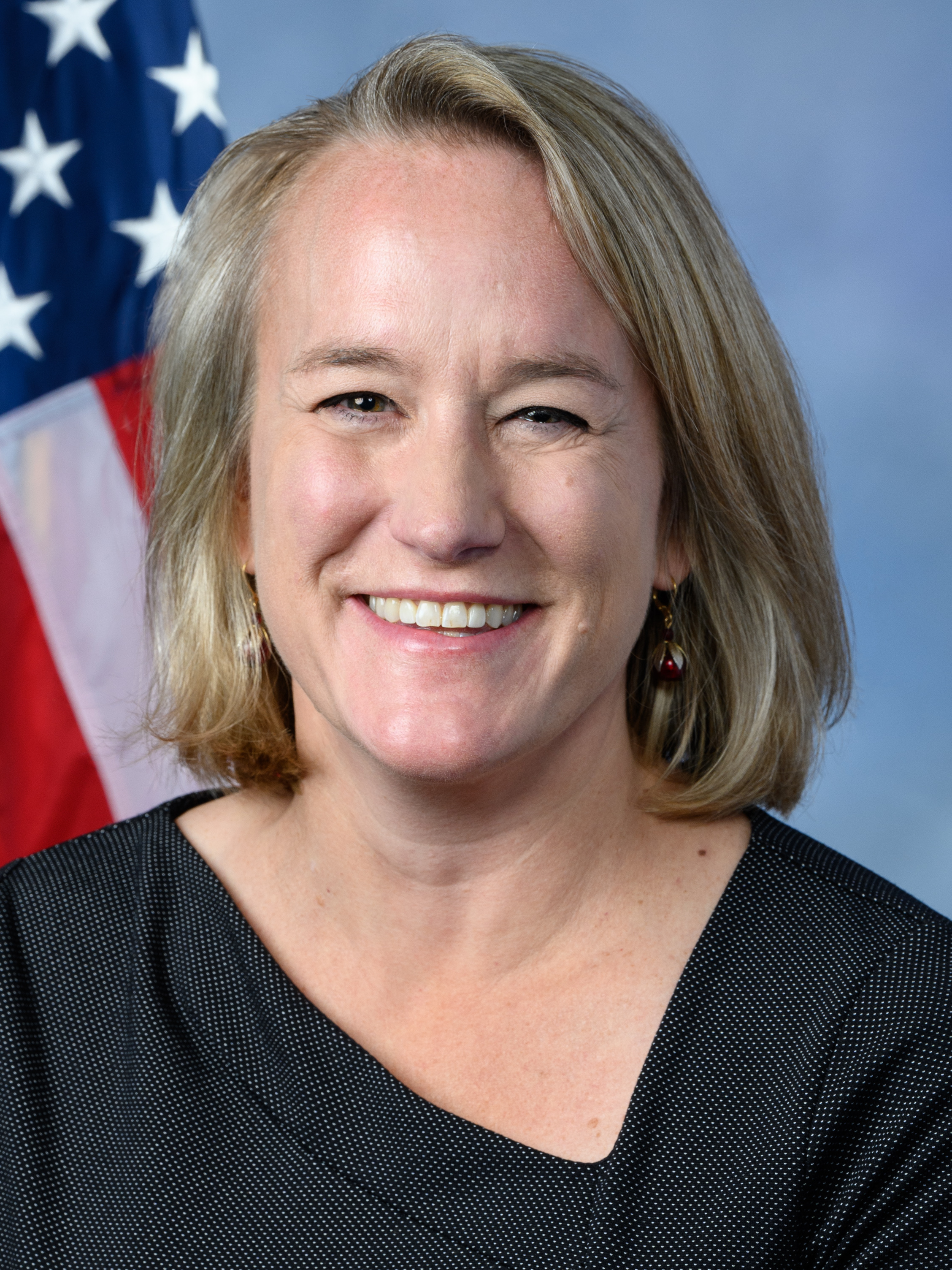

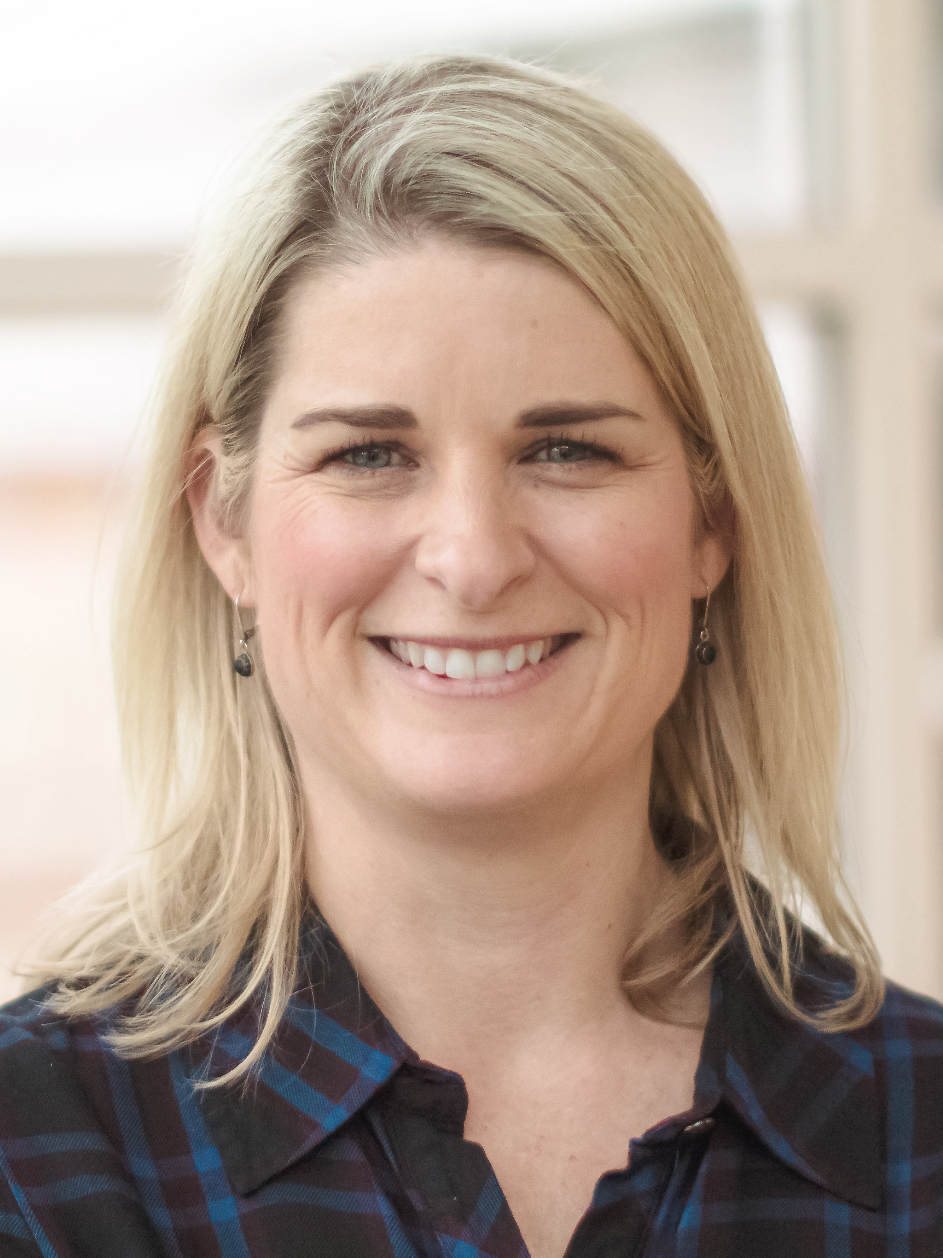
Nominee	Nikki Budzinski	Regan Deering
Party	Democratic	Republican
Popular vote	141,788	108,646
Percentage	56.6%	43.4%
- Budzinski: 50–60% 60–70% 70–80% 80–90% >90% Deering: 50–60% 60–70% 70–80% 80–90% >90% Tie: 50%
U.S. Representative before election
None
(new seat)
Elected U.S. Representative
Nikki Budzinski
Democratic

Due to redistricting, the 13th congressional district was created as a new seat, with no incumbent.

=== Republican primary ===
==== Candidates ====
===== Nominee =====
- Regan Deering, former chair of the Decatur Public Schools Foundation

===== Eliminated in primary =====
- Matt Hausman, aerospace engineer
- Terry Martin, journalist
- Jesse Reising, former federal prosecutor

==== Endorsements ====
Regan Deering

U.S. representatives

- Tim Johnson, former U.S. representative for Illinois's 15th congressional district (2001–2013) (deceased)

Organizations

- Maggie's List
Matt Hausman

U.S. representatives

- Adam Kinzinger, U.S. representative for Illinois's 16th congressional district
Jessie Reising

Federal officials

- Ben Carson, former United States Secretary of Housing and Urban Development (2017–2021)
- Tom Cotton, U.S. senator from Arkansas

U.S. representatives

- John Shimkus, former U.S. representative for Illinois's 20th congressional district (1997–2003), Illinois's 19th congressional district (2003–2013) and Illinois's 15th congressional district (2013–2021)

State legislators

- Larry Bomke, former state senator (1995–2013)

Local officials

- Jack Campbell, Sangamon County sheriff
- Neil Williamson, former Sangamon County sheriff

Organizations

- Sangamon County GOP

==== Debate ====
2022 Illinois's 13th congressional district republican primary debate
No.	Date	Host	Moderator	Link	Republican	Republican	Republican	Republican
Key: P Participant A Absent N Not invited I Invited W Withdrawn								
Key: P Participant A Absent N Not invited I Invited W Withdrawn					Regan Deering	Matt Hausman	Terry Martin	Jesse Reising
1	Jun. 2, 2022	Illinois Public Media; WAND (TV); League of Women Voters of Champaign County	Caryn Eisert; Brian Mackey; Sean Streaty		P	P	P	P

==== Results ====
Results by county: Deering—40–50% Deering—30–40% Reising—40–50% Reising—30–40% Hausman—30–40%

Republican primary results
Party	Candidate	Votes	%
Republican	Regan Deering	14,885	34.6
Republican	Jesse Reising	14,184	32.9
Republican	Matt Hausman	10,289	23.9
Republican	Terry Martin	3,694	8.6
Total votes		43,052	100.0

=== Democratic primary ===
==== Candidates ====
===== Nominee =====
- Nikki Budzinski, former U.S. Office of Management and Budget chief of staff and former senior advisor to governor J. B. Pritzker

===== Eliminated in primary =====
- David Palmer, financial planner

===== Removed from ballot =====
- Ellis Everett Taylor

==== Endorsements ====
Nikki Budzinski

U.S. senators

- Tammy Duckworth, U.S. senator from Illinois (2017–present)
- Dick Durbin, U.S. senator from Illinois (1997–present)
- Elizabeth Warren, U.S. senator from Massachusetts (2013–present)

U.S. representatives

- Cheri Bustos, U.S. representative from IL-17
- Sean Casten, U.S. representative from IL-06 (2019–present)
- Bill Foster, U.S. representative from IL-11 (2008–present)
- Jesús "Chuy" García, U.S. representative from IL-04
- Raja Krishnamoorthi, U.S. representative from IL-08
- Mike Quigley, U.S. representative from IL-05
- Jan Schakowsky, U.S. representative from IL-09 (1999–present)

Statewide officials

- Mike Frerichs, Illinois treasurer

State legislators

- Christopher Belt, Illinois state senator from District 57 (2019–present)
- LaToya Greenwood, Illinois state representative from District 114 (2017–present)
- Jay Hoffman, Illinois state representative from District 113 (2013–present)
- Katie Stuart, Illinois state representative from District 112 (2017–present)

Organizations

- Amalgamated Transit Union
- Communications Workers of America
- Democratic Majority for Israel
- EMILY's List
- End Citizens United
- Humane Society of the United States Legislative Fund
- Illinois AFL–CIO
- Illinois Federation of Teachers
- International Association of Heat and Frost Insulators and Allied Workers
- International Association of Sheet Metal, Air, Rail and Transportation Workers
- International Brotherhood of Electrical Workers Locals 51, 146, 193, 309, 601, and 649
- International Union of Operating Engineers Local 150
- J Street
- League of Conservation Voters
- Madison County Democratic Party
- NARAL Pro-Choice America
- National Association of Letter Carriers
- New Democrat Coalition Action Fund
- Planned Parenthood Action Fund
- Sangamon County Democratic Party
- SEIU State Council
- Sierra Club
- St. Clair County Democratic Party
- United Food and Commercial Workers Local 881
- United Steelworkers
David Palmer

Organizations

- Progressive Democrats of America

==== Forum & debate ====
2022 Illinois's 13th congressional district democratic primary candidate forum & debate
No.	Date	Host	Moderator	Link	Democratic	Democratic	Democratic
Key: P Participant A Absent N Not invited I Invited W Withdrawn							
Key: P Participant A Absent N Not invited I Invited W Withdrawn					Nikki Budzinski	David Palmer	Ellis Taylor
1	Mar. 22, 2022	Bend the Arc: Jewish Action Champaign-Urbana; Indivisible Illinois; Ubuntu Project	Elizabeth Hess		P	P	P
2	May 26, 2022	Illinois Public Media; League of Women Voters of Champaign County; WAND	Tinisha Spain		P	P	N

==== Results ====
Results by county: Budzinski—80–90% Budzinski—70–80% Budzinski—60–70%

Democratic primary results
Party	Candidate	Votes	%
Democratic	Nikki Budzinski	31,593	75.6
Democratic	David Palmer	10,216	24.4
Total votes		41,809	100.0

=== General election ===
==== Debate ====
2022 Illinois's 13th congressional district debate
No.	Date	Host	Moderator	Link	Democratic	Republican
Key: P Participant A Absent N Not invited I Invited W Withdrawn						
Key: P Participant A Absent N Not invited I Invited W Withdrawn					Nikki Budzinski	Regan Deering
1	Oct. 6, 2022	Illinois Public Media; League of Women Voters of Champaign County; WAND	Tinisha Spain		P	P

==== Predictions ====
Source	Ranking	As of
The Cook Political Report	Lean D (flip)	September 29, 2022
Inside Elections	Tilt D (flip)	November 3, 2022
Sabato's Crystal Ball	Lean D (flip)	April 19, 2022
Politico	Lean D (flip)	April 5, 2022
RCP	Tossup	June 9, 2022
Fox News	Lean D (flip)	August 22, 2022
DDHQ	Tossup	July 20, 2022
538	Likely D (flip)	June 30, 2022
The Economist	Likely D (flip)	September 28, 2022

==== Post-primary endorsements ====
Regan Deering (R)

U.S. representatives

- Elise Stefanik, U.S. representative from New York's 21st congressional district

State officials

- Matthew Whitaker, former Acting United States Attorney General (2018–2019)

State legislators

- Sally Turner, state representative

Organizations

- Illinois Farm Bureau
- National Federation of Independent Business
- United States Chamber of Commerce

Labor unions

- Illinois Fraternal Order of Police
Nikki Budzinski (D)

Labor unions

- United Mine Workers

==== Polling ====
Poll source	Date(s) administered	Sample size	Margin of error	Nikki Budzinski (D)	Regan Deering (R)	Undecided
RMG Research	July 21–28, 2022	400 (LV)	± 4.9%	39%	36%	20%

==== Results ====
2022 Illinois's 13th congressional district election
Party	Candidate	Votes	%
Democratic	Nikki Budzinski	141,788	56.6
Republican	Regan Deering	108,646	43.4
Write-in		16	0.0
Total votes		250,450	100.0
Democratic win (new seat)			

== District 14 ==
2022 Illinois's 14th congressional district election
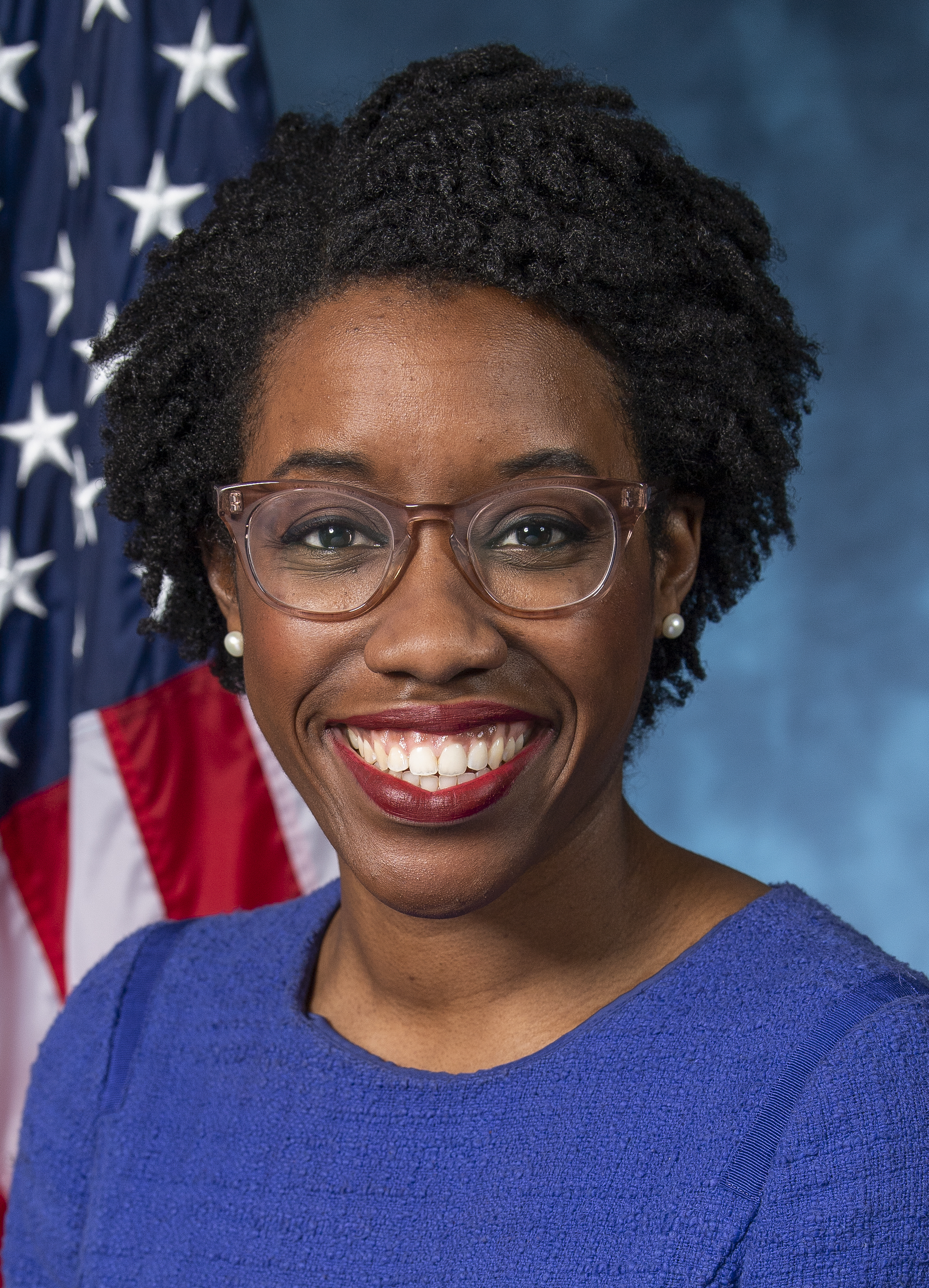

Nominee	Lauren Underwood	Scott Gryder
Party	Democratic	Republican
Popular vote	128,141	108,451
Percentage	54.2%	45.8%
- Underwood: 50–60% 60–70% 70–80% 80–90% >90% Gryder: 50–60% 60–70% 70–80% 80–90% >90% Tie: 50% No votes
U.S. Representative before election
Lauren Underwood
Democratic
Elected U.S. Representative
Lauren Underwood
Democratic

The incumbent was Democrat Lauren Underwood, who was re-elected with 50.7% of the vote in 2020. The 14th district as drawn during the 2020 redistricting cycle includes all or parts of Aurora, DeKalb, Granville, Joliet, Montgomery, Naperville, Oswego, Ottawa, Peru, Plainfield, Shorewood, Spring Valley, Sugar Grove, and Sycamore.

=== Democratic primary ===
==== Candidates ====
===== Nominee =====
- Lauren Underwood, incumbent U.S. representative

==== Endorsements ====
Lauren Underwood

Organizations

- 314 Action
- Democracy for America
- EMILY's List
- End Citizens United
- Feminist Majority PAC
- Giffords
- Illinois AFL–CIO
- Illinois National Organization for Women
- International Union of Operating Engineers Local 150
- League of Conservation Voters
- NARAL Pro-Choice America
- Natural Resources Defense Council
- Peace Action
- Planned Parenthood Action Fund
- Sierra Club

==== Results ====
Democratic primary results
Party	Candidate	Votes	%
Democratic	Lauren Underwood (incumbent)	37,780	100.0
Total votes		37,780	100.0

=== Republican primary ===
==== Candidates ====
===== Nominee =====
- Scott Gryder, chair of the Kendall County Board

===== Eliminated in primary =====
- Michael Koolidge, former radio host
- Jack Lombardi
- James Marter, perennial candidate, software consultant, and chair of the Kendall County Republican Central Committee
- Jaime Milton

==== Endorsements ====
Scott Gryder

State legislators

- Sue Rezin, state senator

Labor unions

- International Union of Operating Engineers Local 150
Mike Koolidge

U.S. representatives

- Darin LaHood, U.S. representative for Illinois's 18th congressional district

State representatives

- Jeanne Ives, former state representative (2013–2019) and nominee for Illinois's 6th congressional district in 2020
James Marter

Individuals

- Michele Bachmann, former U.S. representative from Minnesota's 6th congressional district, dean of Regent University
- Mark Curran, former Lake County sheriff and nominee for U.S. Senate in 2020

Organizations

- Illinois Family Institute

=== Forum ===
2022 Illinois's 13th congressional district republican primary candidate forum
No.	Date	Host	Moderator	Link	Republican	Republican	Republican	Republican	Republican
Key: P Participant A Absent N Not invited I Invited W Withdrawn									
Key: P Participant A Absent N Not invited I Invited W Withdrawn					Scott Gryder	Mike Koolidge	Jack Lombardi II	James Marter	Jaime Milton
1	May 19, 2022	League of Women Voters of DeKalb County; League of Women Voters of Naperville; League of Women Voters of the Aurora area	Jan Dorner		P	P	P	P	P

==== Results ====
Republican primary results
Party	Candidate	Votes	%
Republican	Scott Gryder	13,998	30.9
Republican	James Marter	10,950	24.2
Republican	Mike Koolidge	9,378	20.7
Republican	Jack Lombardi II	6,372	14.1
Republican	Jaime Milton	4,612	10.2
Total votes		45,310	100.0

=== General election ===
==== Forum ====
2022 Illinois's 13th congressional district candidate forum
No.	Date	Host	Moderator	Link	Democratic	Republican
Key: P Participant A Absent N Not invited I Invited W Withdrawn						
Key: P Participant A Absent N Not invited I Invited W Withdrawn					Lauren Underwood	Scott Gryder
1	Oct. 6, 2022	League of Women Voters of DeKalb County; League of Women Voters of Naperville; League of Women Voters of the Aurora area	Carol Tidwell		P	P

==== Predictions ====
Source	Ranking	As of
The Cook Political Report	Lean D	November 1, 2022
Inside Elections	Likely D	May 20, 2022
Sabato's Crystal Ball	Lean D	December 2, 2021
Politico	Likely D	April 5, 2022
RCP	Tossup	October 21, 2022
Fox News	Lean D	July 11, 2022
DDHQ	Likely D	October 17, 2022
538	Likely D	June 30, 2022
The Economist	Likely D	September 28, 2022

==== Results ====
2022 Illinois's 14th congressional district election
Party	Candidate	Votes	%
Democratic	Lauren Underwood (incumbent)	128,141	54.2
Republican	Scott Gryder	108,451	45.8
Write-in		8	0.0
Total votes		236,600	100.0
Democratic hold			

== District 15 ==
2022 Illinois's 15th congressional district election
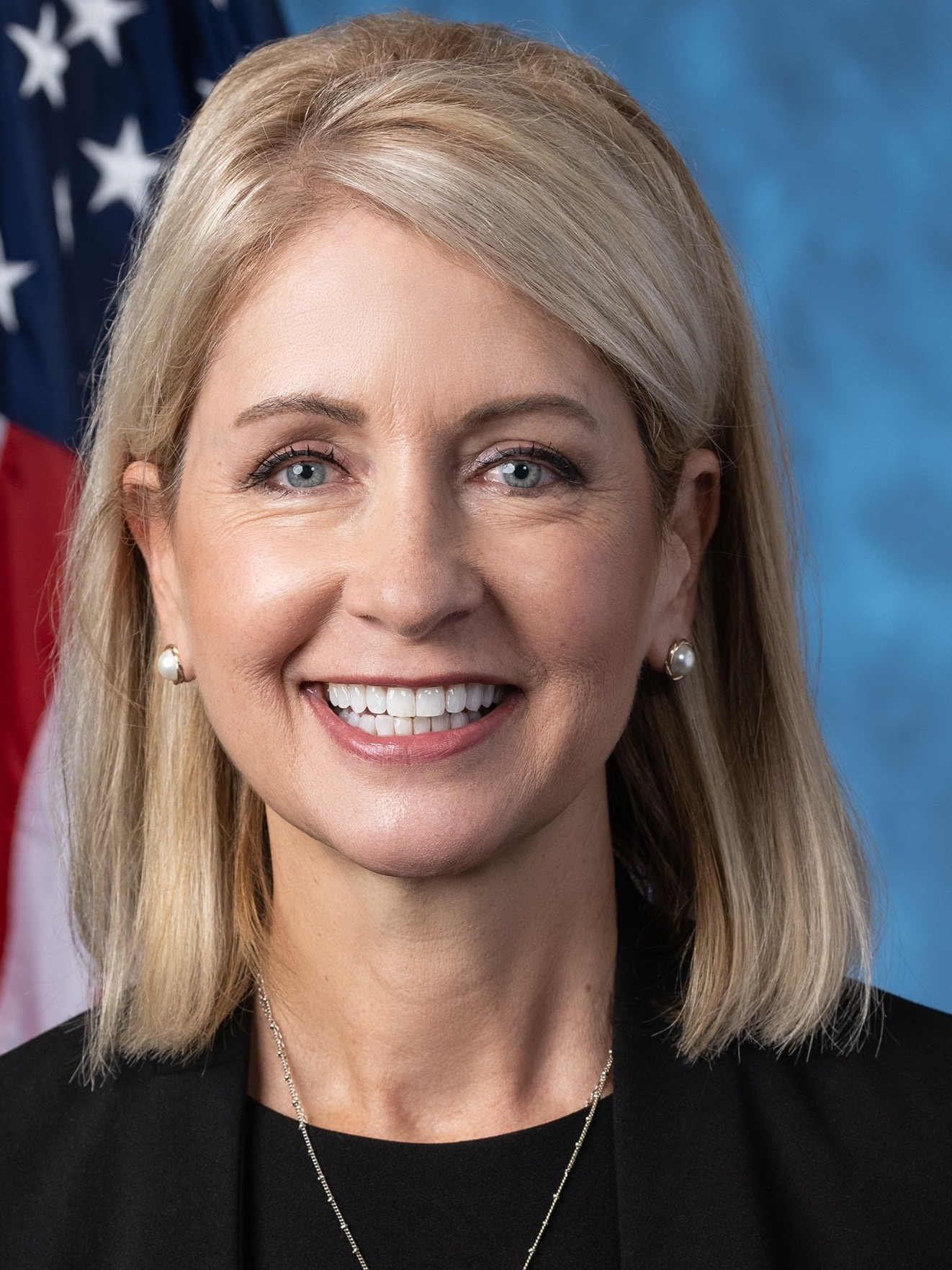

Nominee	Mary Miller	Paul Lange
Party	Republican	Democratic
Popular vote	213,007	86,396
Percentage	71.1%	28.9%
- Miller: 50–60% 60–70% 70–80% 80–90% >90% Lange: 50–60% 60–70% 70–80% 80–90% >90% Tie: 50% No votes
U.S. Representatives before election
Mary Miller (Republican)
Rodney Davis (Republican)
Elected U.S. Representatives
Mary Miller
Republican

Incumbent Republican Mary Miller then represented the 15th congressional district, and was running for re-election in the district. Due to redistricting, Republican Rodney Davis, who represented the 13th congressional district, resided in the 15th district and opted to run in the new 15th district rather than the more Democratic 13th. The new 15th district, located in western and central Illinois, includes all or parts of Adams, Bond, Brown, Calhoun, Cass, Coles, DeWitt, Edgar, Greene, Hancock, Henderson, Jersey, Logan, Macon, Madison, Mercer, Menard, Montgomery, Morgan, Pike, Sangamon, Schuyler, Scott, Shelby, Christian, Vermillion, and Warren counties.

=== Republican primary ===
==== Candidates ====
===== Nominee =====
- Mary Miller, incumbent U.S. representative

===== Eliminated in primary =====
- Rodney Davis, incumbent U.S. representative

==== Endorsements ====
Rodney Davis

U.S. representatives

- Mike Bost, U.S. representative from Illinois's 12th congressional district (2015–present)
- Darin LaHood, U.S. representative from Illinois's 18th congressional district (2015–present)
- Kevin McCarthy, House Minority Leader, U.S. representative from California's 23rd congressional district (2013–present), California's 22nd congressional district (2007–2013)
- John Shimkus, former U.S. representative from Illinois (1997–2021)

State legislators

- Avery Bourne, state representative from the 95th district (2015–present)
- Tim Butler, state representative from the 87th district (2015–present)
- C. D. Davidsmeyer, state representative from the 100th district (2012–present)
- Amy Elik, state representative from the 111th district (2021–present)
- Randy Frese, state representative from the 94th district (2015–present)
- Norine Hammond, state representative from the 93rd district (2013–present; 94th district from 2010–2013)
- Mark Luft, state representative from the 91st district (2021–present)
- Michael Marron, state representative from the 104th district (2018–present)
- Steve McClure, state senator from the 50th district (2019–present)
- Charles Meier, state representative from the 108th district (2013–present)
- Mike Murphy, state representative from the 99th district (2019–2021)
- Jason Plummer, state senator from the 54th district (2019–present)
- Jil Tracy, state senator from the 47th district (2017–present)
- Sally Turner, state senator from the 44th district (2021–present)

Newspapers

- Chicago Tribune

Organizations

- American Federation of Government Employees Local 1304
- Illinois AFL–CIO
- Illinois Chamber of Commerce
- Illinois Farm Bureau
- Illinois Fraternal Order of Police State Lodge
- Pro-Israel America
- US Chamber of Commerce
Mary Miller

U.S. executive branch officials

- Donald Trump, 45th president of the United States (2017–2021)

U.S. senators

- Ted Cruz, U.S. senator from Texas (2013–present)

State legislators

- Darren Bailey, Illinois state senator and 2022 Illinois gubernatorial candidate
- Dan Caulkins, state representative

Organizations

- Club for Growth
- CPAC
- Family Research Council
- FreedomWorks
- Gun Owners of America
- House Freedom Fund
- Huck PAC
- Illinois Family Institute
- Maggie's List
- Susan B. Anthony List
- Turning Point Action

==== Polling ====
Poll source	Date(s) administered	Sample size	Margin of error	Rodney Davis	Mary Miller	Undecided
Cygnal (R) (Note: Poll sponsored by Miller's campaign.)	June 18–19, 2022	420 (LV)	± 4.8%	40%	45%	15%
Victory Geek (D)	June 15–19, 2022	513 (LV)	± 4.3%	38%	35%	27%
Cygnal (R)	~June 7, 2022	–	–	41%	41%	18%

==== Results ====
Results by county Miller: 50–60%; 60–70%; 70–80%; Davis: 50–60%; 60–70%

Republican primary results
Party	Candidate	Votes	%
Republican	Mary Miller (incumbent)	64,549	57.4
Republican	Rodney Davis (incumbent)	47,852	42.6
Total votes		112,401	100.0

=== Democratic primary ===
==== Candidates ====
===== Nominee =====
- Paul Lange, commodity broker

==== Results ====
Democratic primary results
Party	Candidate	Votes	%
Democratic	Paul Lange	21,433	100.0
Total votes		21,433	100.0

=== General election ===
Paul Lange (D)

Labor unions

- United Mine Workers

==== Predictions ====
Source	Ranking	As of
The Cook Political Report	Solid R	November 30, 2021
Inside Elections	Solid R	January 28, 2022
Sabato's Crystal Ball	Safe R	December 2, 2021
Politico	Solid R	April 5, 2022
RCP	Safe R	June 9, 2022
Fox News	Solid R	July 11, 2022
DDHQ	Solid R	July 20, 2022
538	Solid R	June 30, 2022
The Economist	Safe R	September 28, 2022

==== Results ====
2022 Illinois's 15th congressional district election
Party	Candidate	Votes	%
Republican	Mary Miller (incumbent)	213,007	71.1
Democratic	Paul Lange	86,396	28.9
Total votes		299,403	100.0
Republican hold			

== District 16 ==
2022 Illinois's 16th congressional district election
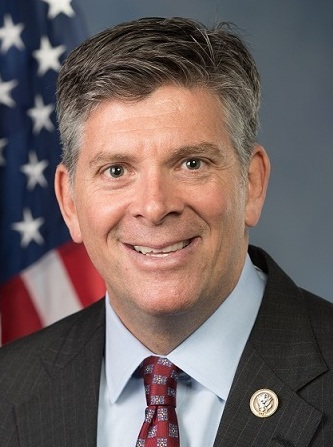

Nominee	Darin LaHood	Elizabeth Haderlein
Party	Republican	Democratic
Popular vote	197,621	100,325
Percentage	66.3%	33.7%
- LaHood: 50–60% 60–70% 70–80% 80–90% >90% Haderlein: 50–60% 60–70% Tie: 50%
U.S. Representatives before election
Adam Kinzinger (Republican)
Darin LaHood (Republican)
Republican
Elected U.S. Representatives
Darin LaHood
Republican

The incumbents were Republican Adam Kinzinger, who was re-elected with 64.7% of the vote in 2020, and Republican Darin LaHood, who was redistricted from the 18th Congressional District. Kinzinger chose to retire, while LaHood chose to run in his new district.

=== Republican primary ===
==== Candidates ====
===== Nominee =====
- Darin LaHood, incumbent U.S. representative.

===== Eliminated in primary =====
- JoAnne Guillemette, Democratic candidate for Illinois's 1st congressional district in 2010
- Walt Peters
- Michael Rebresh, truck driver

===== Withdrew =====
- Gene Koprowski, former official at the Heartland Institute
- Catalina Lauf, former advisor at the U.S. Department of Commerce and candidate for Illinois's 14th congressional district in 2020 (ran in the 11th district)
- Jack Lombardi (ran in the 14th district)
- James Marter, software consultant (ran in the 14th district)
- Teresa Pfaff, home improvement worker (ran in the 17th district)
- Geno Young, musician (ran in the 1st district )

===== Declined =====
- Adam Kinzinger, incumbent U.S. representative

==== Endorsements ====
Darin LaHood

Federal officials

- Donald Trump, former president of the United States

==== Results ====
Republican primary results
Party	Candidate	Votes	%
Republican	Darin LaHood (incumbent)	56,582	66.4
Republican	Walt Peters	11,278	13.2
Republican	JoAnne Guillemette	10,476	12.3
Republican	Michael Rebresh	6,911	8.1
Total votes		85,247	100.0

=== Democratic nominee ===
- Elizabeth Haderlein, Harvard city councillor

==== Endorsements ====
Elizabeth Haderlein

Organizations

- National Organization for Women

=== General election ===
==== Predictions ====
Source	Ranking	As of
The Cook Political Report	Solid R	November 30, 2021
Inside Elections	Solid R	January 28, 2022
Sabato's Crystal Ball	Safe R	December 2, 2021
Politico	Solid R	April 5, 2022
RCP	Safe R	June 9, 2022
Fox News	Solid R	July 11, 2022
DDHQ	Solid R	July 20, 2022
538	Solid R	June 30, 2022
The Economist	Safe R	September 28, 2022

==== Results ====
2022 Illinois's 16th congressional district election
Party	Candidate	Votes	%
Republican	Darin LaHood (incumbent)	197,621	66.3
Democratic	Elizabeth Haderlein	100,325	33.7
Total votes		297,946	100.0
Republican hold			

== District 17 ==
2022 Illinois's 17th congressional district election
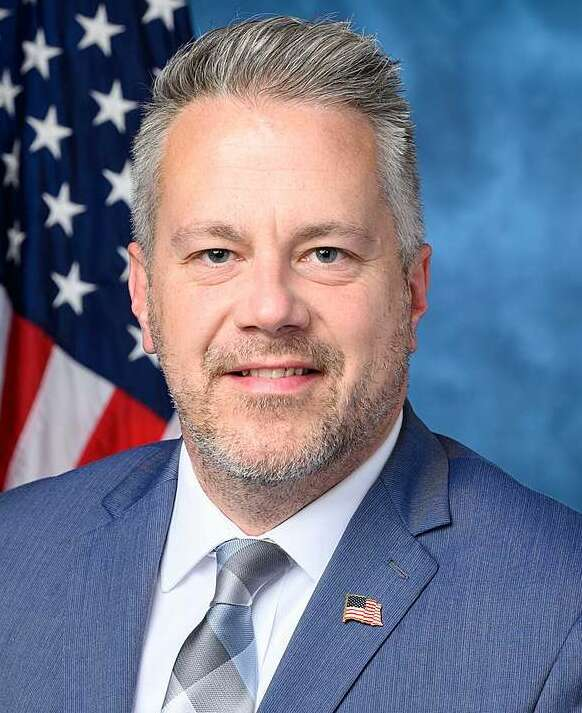

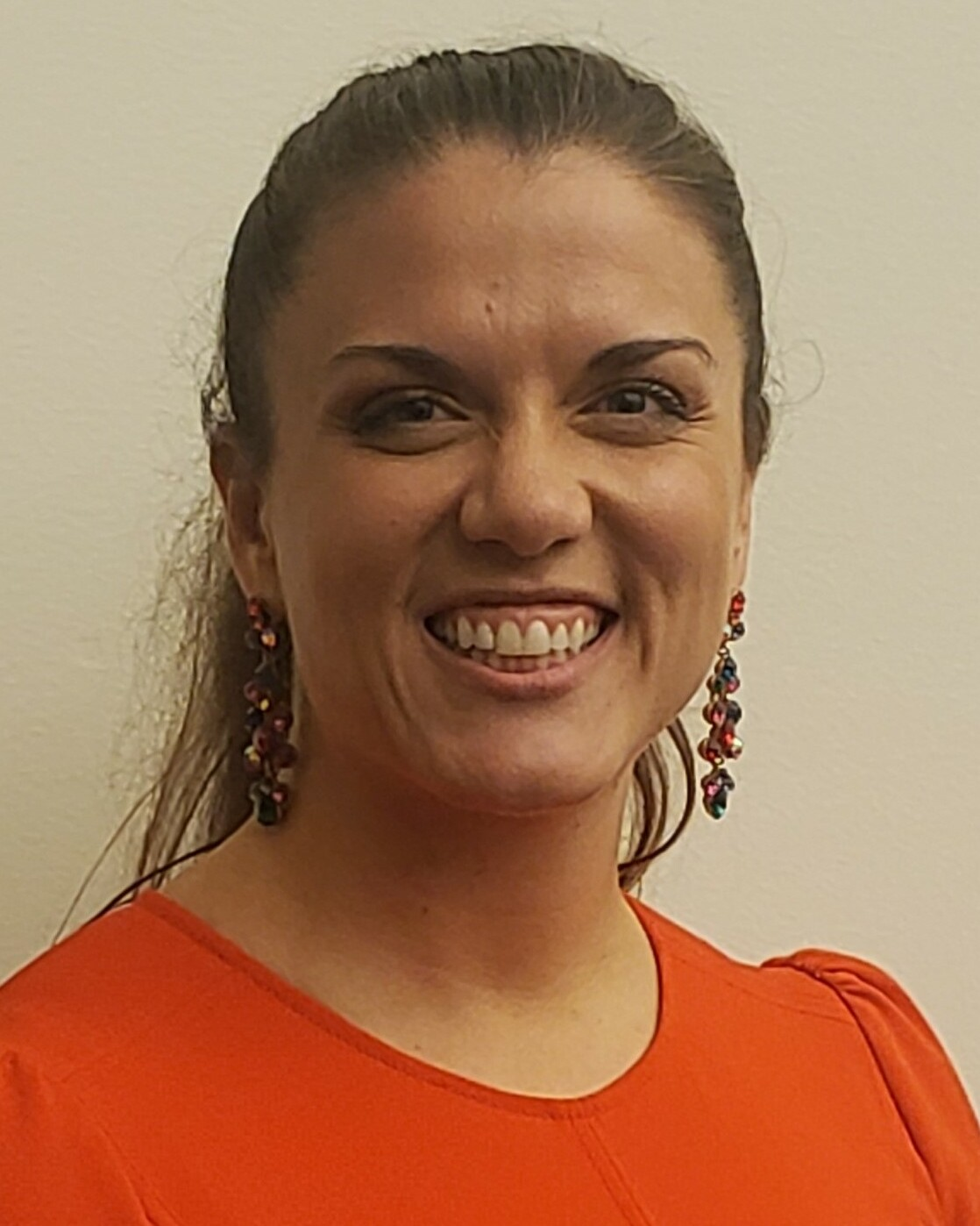
Nominee	Eric Sorensen	Esther Joy King
Party	Democratic	Republican
Popular vote	121,186	111,931
Percentage	52.0%	48.0%
- Sorensen: 40–50% 50–60% 60–70% 70–80% 80–90% >90% King: 50–60% 60–70% 70–80% 80–90% >90% Tie: 50%
U.S. Representative before election
Cheri Bustos
Democratic
Elected U.S. Representative
Eric Sorensen
Democratic

The incumbent was Democrat Cheri Bustos, who was re-elected with 52.0% of the vote in 2020. She did not seek re-election in 2022.

The new 17th was drawn to be more Democratic-leaning than its predecessor. The new district contains nearly all of its Democratic-leaning urban portions of its former territory, while most of the Republican-leaning areas of the old 17th were drawn into the neighboring 15th and 16th districts. Had the new 17th existed in the 2020 election, Joe Biden would have carried it by eight points, whereas Donald Trump carried the old 17th by two points in 2020.

=== Democratic primary ===
==== Candidates ====
===== Nominee =====
- Eric Sorensen, former meteorologist

===== Eliminated in primary =====
- Jonathan Logemann, Afghanistan veteran and Rockford alderman from the 2nd ward
- Jacqueline McGowan, cannabis lobbyist, 2021 California gubernatorial recall election candidate
- Angie Normoyle, Rock Island County Board member
- Litesa Wallace, former state representative and candidate for lieutenant governor in 2018
- Marsha Williams, chair of the Minooka Alumni Association

===== Declined =====
- Cheri Bustos, incumbent U.S. representative

===== Disqualified =====
- Linda McNeely, Rockford alderman from the 13th ward

==== Endorsements ====
Jonathan Logemann

Newspapers

- Chicago Tribune

Organizations

- Illinois AFL–CIO
- VoteVets.org
Angie Normoyle

Local officials

- Porter McNeil, Rock Island County board member
Eric Sorensen

U.S. representatives

- David Cicilline, U.S. representative from Rhode Island's 1st congressional district (2011–2023)
- Mark Takano, U.S. representative from California's 41st congressional district (2013–)

Organizations

- 314 Action
- End Citizens United (post-primary)
- League of Conservation Voters Action Fund
- Let America Vote (post-primary)
- LGBTQ Victory Fund
- New Democrat Coalition Action Fund (post-primary)
- Sierra Club
Litesa Wallace

State representatives

- Kam Buckner, state representative from the 26th district (2019–present)
- Ann Williams, state representative from the 11th district (2011–present)
- Kathleen Willis, state representative from the 77th district (2013–present)

Mayors

- Peter Schwartzman, mayor of Galesburg

Organizations

- Indivisible
- National Organization for Women PAC
- Our Revolution Illinois

Labor unions

- Amalgamated Transit Union
- American Federation of Teachers Illinois
- Service Employees International Union Illinois
Marsha Williams

Organizations

- Brand New Congress

==== Polling ====
Poll source	Date(s) administered	Sample size	Margin of error	Jonathan Logemann	Jackie McGowan	Spence Morris	Angie Normoyle	Eric Sorensen	Litesa Wallace	Marsha Williams	Undecided
Triton Polling & Research (D) (Note: Poll sponsored by Wallace's campaign.)	May 2–5, 2022	522 (LV)	± 4.3%	5%	2%	–	8%	19%	22%	3%	42%
Impact Research (D) (Note: Poll sponsored by Sorensen's campaign.)	April 11–14, 2022	600 (LV)	± 4.0%	5%	1%	0%	3%	20%	16%	2%	51%
RMG Research	March 10–15, 2022	311 (LV)	± 5.6%	4%	3%	4%	1%	8%	4%	2%	75%
Public Policy Polling (D) (Note: Poll sponsored by 314 Action, which supports Sorensen.)	January 26–27, 2022	582 (LV)	± 4.1%	3%	3%	1%	3%	13%	11%	1%	65%

==== Results ====
Democratic primary results
Party	Candidate	Votes	%
Democratic	Eric Sorensen	14,702	37.7
Democratic	Litesa Wallace	9,103	23.3
Democratic	Jonathan Logemann	5,628	14.4
Democratic	Angie Normoyle	4,818	12.4
Democratic	Marsha Williams	2,701	6.9
Democratic	Jacqueline McGowan	2,040	5.2
Write-in		14	0.0
Total votes		39,006	100.0

=== Republican primary ===
==== Candidates ====
===== Nominee =====
- Esther Joy King, nominee for Illinois's 17th congressional district in 2020

===== Eliminated in primary =====
- Charlie Hemlick

==== Endorsements ====
Esther Joy King

U.S. representatives

- Kevin McCarthy, U.S. representative for California's 23rd congressional district (2007–present) and House Minority Leader (2019–present)
- Elise Stefanik, U.S. representative for New York's 21st congressional district (2015–present)

Newspapers

- Chicago Tribune

Organizations

- Congressional Leadership Fund
- Huck PAC
- Maggie's List
- Republican Jewish Coalition PAC
- SEAL PAC
- Tea Party Express
- United States Chamber of Commerce

==== Results ====
Republican primary results
Party	Candidate	Votes	%
Republican	Esther Joy King	31,065	68.5
Republican	Charlie Helmick	14,274	31.5
Total votes		45,339	100.0

=== General election ===
==== Debate ====
2022 Illinois's 17th congressional district debate
No.	Date	Host	Moderator	Link	Republican	Democratic
Key: P Participant A Absent N Not invited I Invited W Withdrawn						
Key: P Participant A Absent N Not invited I Invited W Withdrawn					Esther Joy King	Eric Sorenson
1	Oct. 4, 2022	WCBU, WGLT, WNIJ; WVIK and the League of Women Voters of Greater Peoria	Yvonne Boose; Tim Shelley		P	P

==== Predictions ====
Source	Ranking	As of
The Cook Political Report	Tossup	November 30, 2021
Inside Elections	Tossup	November 3, 2022
Sabato's Crystal Ball	Lean R (flip)	November 7, 2022
Politico	Tossup	April 5, 2022
RCP	Lean R (flip)	June 9, 2022
Fox News	Tossup	September 20, 2022
DDHQ	Lean R (flip)	October 6, 2022
538	Lean D	September 29, 2022
The Economist	Tossup	November 8, 2022

==== Polling ====
Poll source	Date(s) administered	Sample size	Margin of error	Eric Sorensen (D)	Esther Joy King (R)	Undecided
Public Policy Polling (D)	September 21–22, 2022	642 (LV)	–	47%	38%	15%

Hypothetical polling

Generic Democrat vs. generic Republican

Poll source	Date(s) administered	Sample size	Margin of error	Generic Democrat	Generic Republican	Undecided
GBAO (D) (Note: Poll sponsored by the House Majority PAC.)	October 9, 2022	–	–	49%	44%	7%

==== Results ====
2022 Illinois's 17th congressional district election
Party	Candidate	Votes	%
Democratic	Eric Sorensen	121,186	52.0
Republican	Esther Joy King	111,931	48.0
Write-in		6	0.0
Total votes		233,123	100.0
Democratic hold			

== Notes ==
Partisan clients
