= Iymen Chehade =

American history professor

- Born: Iymen Hamman Chehade; Chicago, Illinois, U.S.
- Education: University of Illinois, Chicago (BA, MA)
- Occupations: History professor, human rights activist
- Political party: Democratic

Iymen H Chehade is an American professor, activist, and former head of Foreign Policy and Research for the Marie Newman IL 06 congressional campaign. He ran as a Democratic candidate in 2022 United States House of Representatives elections in Illinois' 3rd congressional district, which had no incumbent.

== Early life and education ==
Iymen Chehade was born in Chicago and grew up in the Avondale and Logan Square neighborhoods. He is the son of immigrant parents from Palestine. Chehade holds a Bachelor's degree in History and a Master’s degree in Education from the University of Illinois Chicago.

== Academic career ==
Iymen Chehade is an adjunct professor of history teaching at The School of the Art Institute of Chicago (SAIC) and the Columbia College Chicago. His courses focus on contemporary middle eastern history and events, including courses he created on the Palestine-Israeli crisis and the war in Syria.

== Activism ==
Iymen Chehade is a political and human rights activist. Professor Chehade often serves as faculty adviser to the Students for Justice in Palestine (SJP) chapters at SAIC and Columbia College Chicago.

=== Academic freedom ===
After screening Five Broken Cameras during his Palestine-Israeli crisis course at Columbia College Chicago a single-student complained about purported "bias" in one of the two sections during fall semester of 2013. Columbia College Chicago removed one of Chehade's scheduled sections for the 2014 spring semester. The American Association of University Professors in accordance with the Columbia College collective bargaining agreement definition of academic freedom found that Columbia College was guilty of academic freedom violations. The class was reinstated.

After the case, Professor Chehade served as one of five committee members on the American Association of University Professors Committee A on Academic Freedom.

=== Uprising Theater ===
Iymen Chehade is the founder of Uprising Theater, a nonprofit in Chicago, dedicated to working to give voice to the people of Palestine and others who are marginalized. In 2009, Chehade wrote and directed a play about a Palestinian family living under occupation called Garden of the Three. Uprising Theater functions as a community outreach organization providing artist stipends and income opportunities to artists during the COVID19 pandemic. In addition with producing readings and workshops, Uprising distributed PPE and holiday meals in Chicago to communities in need, hosting blood drives, collecting textiles to recycle and more.

== Political career ==
In December 2021, Iymen Chehade announced that he would run in the 2022 United States House of Representatives elections in Illinois' 3rd congressional district. The district was an open seat due to redistricting after the 2020 U.S. census, there was no incumbent. He ran against Gilbert Villegas, a member of Chicago City Council 36th Ward, and Delia Ramirez, the sitting representative for the Illinois House of Representatives 4th district. Chehade lost the race to Villegas on second place and Ramirez on first.

Iymen Chehade identified Medicare for All, Education for All, Immigration reform, and a Marshall Plan for the US as his primary issues of concern.

On January 19, 2021 Chehade filed a lawsuit against U.S. Representative Marie Newman to enforce a contract the two had signed. The lawsuit was settled. In response to criticism of the arrangement between Chehade and Newman, Chehade expressed his disappointment that critics are "using a labor agreement as a cheap tool for political gain at a time when so many working people in Illinois are facing hardships.”
