= National Agri-Marketing Association =

The National Agri-Marketing Association (NAMA) is a non-profit organization of more than 3,500 professional and student members, serving the food and fiber industry. NAMA provides access to solutions and opportunities in agribusiness.
