= Regan Deering =

American politician

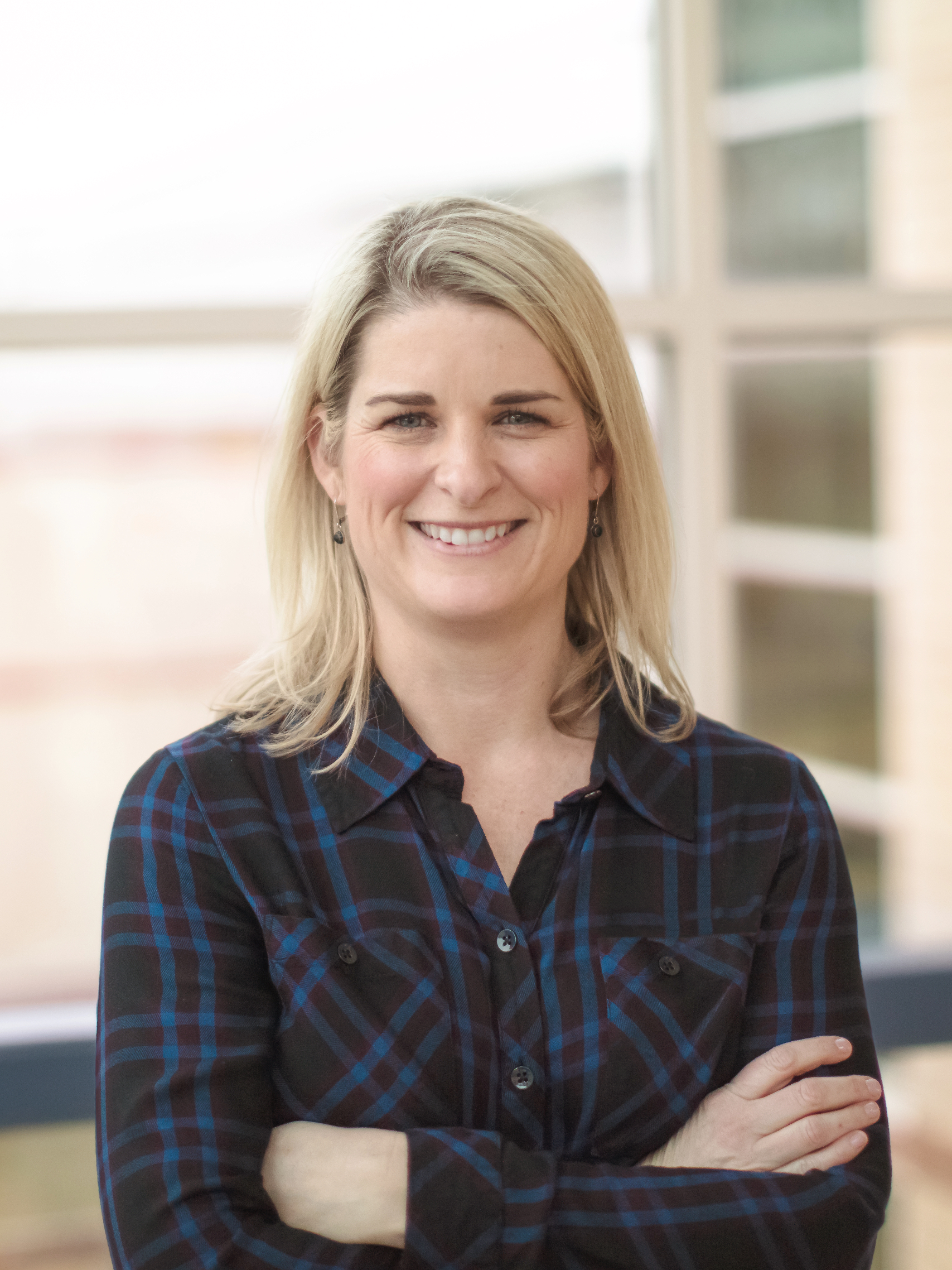
- Deering in 2022

Member of the Illinois House of Representatives from the 88th district
- Incumbent
- Assumed office January 9, 2025
- Preceded by: Dan Caulkins

Personal details
- Born: 1974 or 1975 (age 50–51) Decatur, Illinois
- Party: Republican
- Children: 3
- Education: Duke University (B.S.); DePaul University (M.A.)

Regan Deering is an American politician. A member of the Republican Party, she was elected to the Illinois House of Representatives representing the 88th district in 2024.

== Early life ==
Deering grew up in Decatur, Illinois. She graduated with a bachelor of science in biology from Duke University and a master of arts in education from DePaul University. After graduating from college, Deering worked at the Shedd Aquarium and as a biology teacher at a private school in the Lincoln Park neighborhood of Chicago. She then ran a Huntington Learning Center franchise in Decatur. Deering became politically active during the COVID-19 pandemic, joining a lawsuit against the state's mask mandate in public schools.

== Political career ==
Deering filed to run for Illinois's 13th congressional district in January 2022. She won the Republican Party primary, but lost to Democratic Party candidate Nikki Budzinski in the general election with 43.4% of the vote. She was elected to the Mount Zion School Board in April 2023.

She ran for the 88th district of the Illinois House of Representatives in 2024. She won the Republican Party primary in March 2024 with 68.6% of the vote. She ran unopposed in the general election. Shortly after taking office, she proposed a bill banning transgender girls from participating in girls sports, which failed to pass. She filed for re-election in June 2025.

== Personal life ==
Deering's grandfather was Dwayne Andreas, former CEO and chairman of Archer Daniels Midland. She has three children. As of 2022, she lived in Decatur.
