= Kina Collins =

American activist (born 1991)

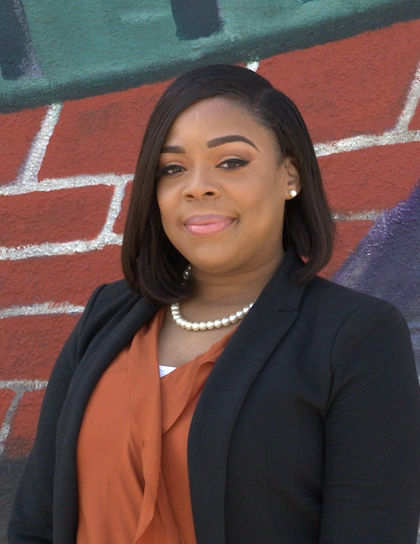

Personal details
- Born: March 8, 1991 (age 35) Chicago, Illinois, U.S.
- Party: Democratic
- Education: Carthage College (attended); Louisiana State University (BA)
- Website: Official website

Kina Isis Collins is an American community organizer and activist, whose work has focused on issues of gun control, criminal justice reform, and universal healthcare. Collins was a candidate in the Democratic primary for the United States House of Representatives elections in Illinois for Illinois's 7th congressional district, and was previously a primary candidate for the same seat in the 2020 and 2022 elections, winning 13.8% and 45.6% of the vote respectively.

== Early life and education ==
Collins was born and raised in the Austin neighborhood on the West Side of Chicago. She was a student in the Chicago Public Schools system, during which time she served as a Summer of Service Learning Ambassador. She attended Carthage College and Louisiana State University, where she studied international political economy and sociology respectively.

== Activism and career ==
=== Community organizing and non-profit work ===
From 2015 to 2017, Collins worked as a regional organizer from Louisiana for Generation Progress, a youth-centered research and advocacy group formed under the Center for American Progress. During 2016–17, she was selected as a member of Generation Progress' #Fight4AFuture National Leadership Council, which developed campaigns on gun violence prevention and criminal justice reform.

In 2017, she founded an organization called the Chicago Neighborhood Alliance, with the goal of empowering activists to end gun violence in Chicago through civic engagement. From 2018 to 2019, she worked as a national organizer for Physicians for a National Health Program. As of 2020, she serves as the Executive Director of the Gun Violence Prevention Education Center and Illinois Council Against Handgun Violence, a statewide organization focused on gun violence prevention.

=== Electoral politics and government ===
Collins was a staff member in J. B. Pritzker's campaign for governor of Illinois in 2018, but resigned after recordings of conversations between Pritzker and Rod Blagojevich in 2009 where Pritzker made racially insensitive remarks were publicly released. Later in that election cycle, she served as the political director for Sameena Mustafa's unsuccessful campaign for Illinois's 5th congressional district.

In 2018, Collins co-authored the Illinois Council on Women and Girls Act, which created a council to advise the governor and state lawmakers on issues concerning women and girls. She served as the Council's inaugural chairwoman. During her tenure as the Council's chair, Collins was also selected by Chicago City Clerk Anna Valencia to serve on the Status of Women and Girls in Chicago working group.

During the 2019 Chicago aldermanic election, Collins helped form a coalition of organizations called Brand New Council, which aimed to elect progressive candidates of color to Chicago City Council. The coalition endorsed 16 candidates and worked to register new voters.

=== Recognition ===
She received the Vernita Grey Community Activist Award from the Chicago chapter of the National Organization for Women in 2018.

== Congressional elections ==
=== 2020 ===
Collins announced her candidacy for U.S. Representative from Illinois's 7th congressional district on May 13, 2019. She challenged incumbent congressman Danny K. Davis in the Democratic Party primary election for the seat in March 2020, in addition to two other challengers, Anthony Clark and Kristine Schanbacher. Collins highlighted single-payer healthcare, research and resources for gun violence prevention, and criminal justice reform as her three top priorities if elected. She received endorsements from several local officials, including Chicago alderman Jeanette Taylor, Illinois House Representative Anna Moeller, two Oak Park village trustees, two River Forest village trustees, and two local school board members. She was also endorsed by several organizations including the Center for Popular Democracy, Women's March Illinois, and Northside Democracy for America. In the March 17, 2020, Democratic primary election, she placed second with 13.8% of the vote.

=== 2022 ===
Collins announced her candidacy for Illinois's 7th congressional district in 2022 on June 1, 2021. Along with the launch of her campaign, she announced an endorsement from Justice Democrats. Collins outraised incumbent Representative Danny Davis in both of the first two quarters of her campaign. In the June 28, 2022, Democratic primary election, she placed second with 45% of the vote.

== Electoral history ==
=== 2020 ===
2020 Democratic primary for Illinois's 7th congressional district
Party	Candidate	Votes	%
Democratic	Danny K. Davis (incumbent)	79,813	60.2
Democratic	Kina Collins	18,399	13.8
Democratic	Anthony Clark	17,206	13.0
Democratic	Kristine Schanbacher	17,187	13.0
Total votes		132,605	100.0

=== 2022 ===
2022 Democratic primary for Illinois's 7th congressional district
Party	Candidate	Votes	%
Democratic	Danny K. Davis (incumbent)	35,366	52.0
Democratic	Kina Collins	31,054	45.6
Democratic	Denarvis Mendenhall	1,626	2.4
Total votes		68,046	100.0
