= Dan Caulkins =

American politician

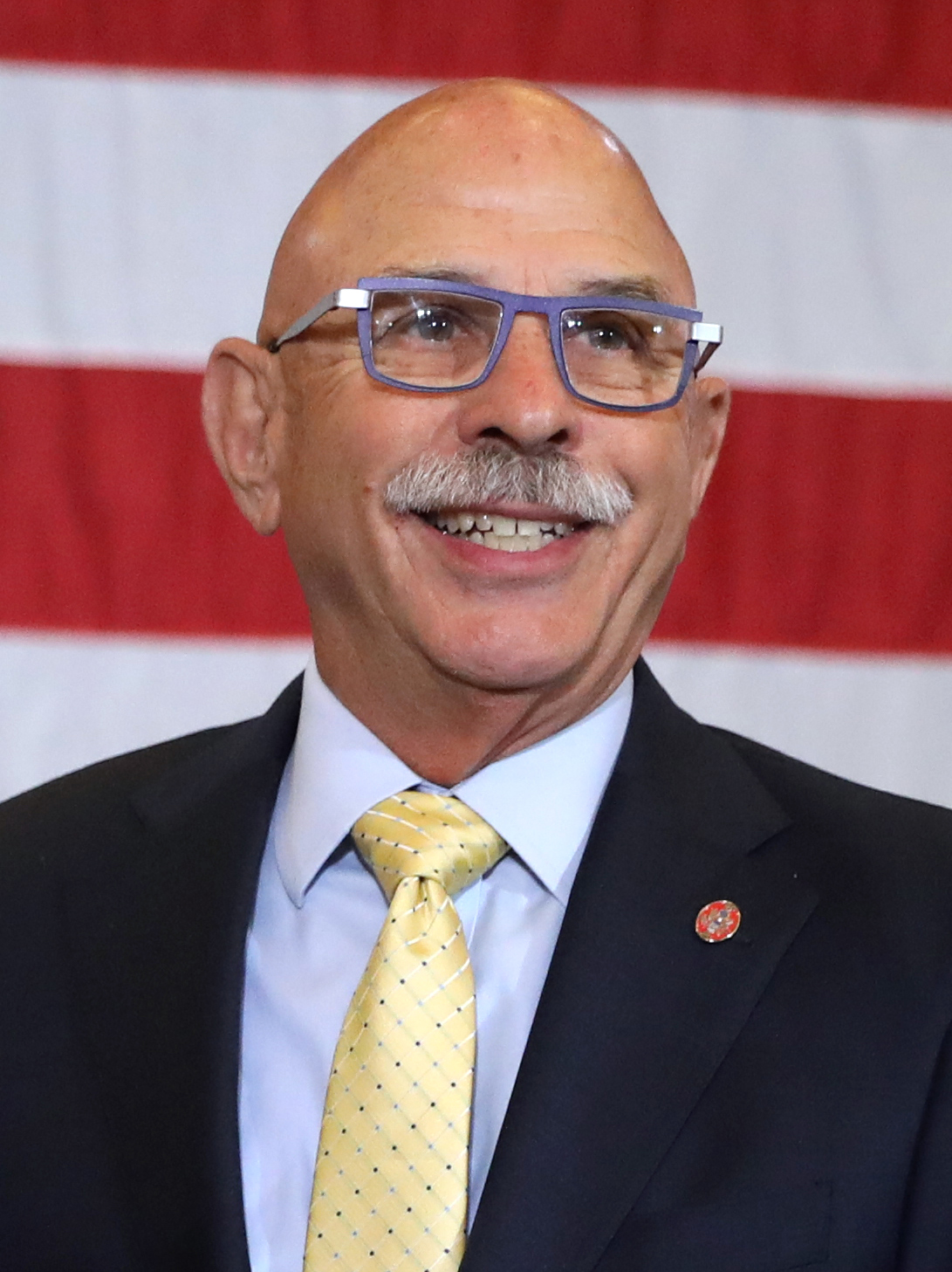

Member of the Illinois House of Representatives from the 88th district
- In office January 11, 2023 – January 8, 2025
- Preceded by: Keith P. Sommer
- Succeeded by: Regan Deering

Personal details
- Born: Lincoln, Nebraska, U.S.
- Party: Republican
- Education: Eastern Illinois University
- Profession: Business owner (retired)

Dan Caulkins is a former Republican member of the Illinois House of Representatives for the 88th district of Illinois, USA. The district, located in east central Illinois, includes all or parts of Livingston, DeWitt, Macon, McLean and Piatt counties. In the 2018 Republican primary, Caulkins defeated Todd Henricks, the Cerro Gordo C.U.S.D. #100 Board of Education president, and Randy Keith, the Piatt County Board chairman. He defeated Democratic candidate Jen McMillan in the 2018 general election. Caulkins was on the city council in Decatur, Illinois, from 2005 until 2009 and as a member of the Eastern Illinois University Board of Trustees from 2015 until 2018. He owned a number of assisted living facilities until retiring in 2015.

On July 30, 2024, Caulkins was a member of the following Illinois House committees:

- Cybersecurity, Data Analytics, & IT Committee (HCDA)
- Energy & Environment Committee (HENG)
- Labor & Commerce Committee (HLBR)
- Occupational Licenses Subcommittee (HLBR-HLOL)
- Prescription Drug Affordability & Accessibility Committee (HPDA)
- Public Utilities Committee (HPUB)

== Electoral history ==
Illinois 101st State House District Republican Primary, 2018
Party	Candidate	Votes	%
Republican	Dan Caulkins	6,112	43.94
Republican	Randy J. Keith	5,282	37.98
Republican	Todd C. Henricks	2,515	18.08
Total votes		13,909	100.0

Illinois 101st State House District General Election, 2018
Party	Candidate	Votes	%
Republican	Dan Caulkins	33,043	69.68
Democratic	Jennifer McMillin	14,379	30.32
Total votes		47,422	100.0
