= Food and fiber system =

Agricultural sector of the U.S. economy

The food and fiber system is the sector of the U.S. economy that includes agricultural production and all economic activities supporting or utilizing that production, including farm machinery and chemical production, and processing, manufacturing, transportation, and retailing. In 2000, the food and fiber system employed 24.1 million workers, or 17.1% of the U.S. employment, and accounted for $1,264 billion, or 12.8% of the gross domestic product. Farming is one of the smaller components of the system, accounting for 1.2% of U.S. employment and $82 billion in value added to GDP.

== Food and fiber protectionism ==
The term "food and fiber" is also used to describe a form of economic protectionism consisting of protectionist policies and government subsidies for the nation's own agricultural industry. This form of protectionism has been criticized because developed nations often claim to want free trade and reduced trade barriers, while they heavily protect their own agricultural sector.
