= Illinois's 2nd House of Representatives district =

American legislative district

Illinois's 2nd State House of Representatives district
Representative
Elizabeth Hernandez; D–Cicero
since 2023
- Demographics: 17.2% White; 3.2% Black; 50.7% Hispanic; 26.8% Asian; 0.1% Native American; 0.0% Hawaiian/Pacific Islander; 0.3% Other; 1.58% Multiracial
- Population (2020): 107,486
- Created: 1983–present 1849–1873, 1957–1973

Illinois's 2nd House of Representatives district is a Representative district within the Illinois House of Representatives located in Cook County, Illinois. It has been represented by Democrat Elizabeth Hernandez since January 11, 2023. The district was previously represented by Democrat Theresa Mah from 2017 to 2023.

The district covers parts of Berwyn, Brookfield, Chicago, Cicero, Lyons, McCook, Riverside, Stickney, and Summit, and of Chicago's neighborhoods, it covers part of Garfield Ridge.

== Representative district history ==
Prior to the ratification of the 1848 Illinois Constitution, counties (or two or more counties) were designated a certain number of Senators and Representatives. With the ratification of the 1848 Illinois Constitution, Legislative and Representative districts were numbered and called by name. Each district was still assigned a certain number of Senators and Representatives. After the passage of the 1872 Apportionment, only Legislative districts were drawn with Representatives elected cumulatively. The 1954 amendment to the 1870 Illinois Constitution established Representative districts as separate from Legislative districts (with representatives still elected cumulatively). The boundaries of Representative and Legislative districts would differ. After the United States Supreme Court ruled in Reynolds v. Sims (1964) that "both houses of state legislatures must be apportioned according to districts of equal population," new districts were redrawn for the Illinois Senate and Illinois House of Representatives. While the Legislative districts were redrawn, the Governor and General Assembly failed to agree on Representative district boundaries. Under the 1954 amendment, "a 10-man bipartisan commission appointed by the governor from recommendations made by both parties" were directed to redraw boundaries but failed to do so in 1963. Because of this failure, and with no district boundaries redrawn, all Representative districts were temporarily merged into one at-large district with 177 representatives (the total number of representatives at the time). The 1964 Illinois House election had several candidates running for all 177 seats throughout the state. In 1965, the Representative districts were redrawn by the Illinois Legislative Reapportionment Commission and elections held in 1966 were done with separate districts. With the 1971 Apportionment (and adoption of the 1970 Illinois Constitution), Representative districts were abolished and representatives were once again elected cumulatively per Legislative district. After the passage of the Cutback Amendment in 1980, the number of Representatives was reduced from 177 to 118 with Representative districts re-established and now electing a single representative.

== List of representatives ==
=== 1849 – 1873 ===
Representative	Party	Years (Note: From 1870 to 1970, the GA met for a new session on the Wednesday after the first Monday of January.)	General Assembly (GA)	Electoral history	Counties represented
District established with 1848 Illinois Constitution
Wesley Sloan	Independent	January 1, 1849 – January 3, 1853	16th 17th 18th	Elected in 1848; Re-elected in 1850; Re-elected in 1852; Was not re-elected in 1854	Hardin; Massac; Pope
Wesley Sloan	Democratic	January 3, 1853 – January 1, 1855	16th 17th 18th	Elected in 1848; Re-elected in 1850; Re-elected in 1852; Was not re-elected in 1854	Hardin; Massac; Pope
G. M. Gray	Whig	January 1, 1855 – January 5, 1857	19th	Elected in 1854; Was not re-elected in 1856	Hardin; Massac; Pope
Wesley Sloan	Democratic	January 5, 1857 – January 3, 1859	20th	Elected back in 1856; Was not re-elected in 1858	Hardin; Massac; Pope
William H. Green	Democratic	January 3, 1859 – January 5, 1863	21st 22nd	Elected in 1858; Re-elected in 1860; Was not re-elected in 1862	Hardin; Massac; Pope
Thomas B. Hicks	Unknown	January 5, 1863 – January 2, 1865	23rd	Elected in 1862; Was not re-elected in 1864	Johnson; Massac; Pope
William A. Looney	National Union	January 2, 1865 – January 7, 1867	24th	Elected in 1864; Was not re-elected in 1866	Johnson; Massac; Pope
Phil. G. Clemens	Unknown	January 7, 1867 – January 4, 1869	25th	Elected in 1866; Was not re-elected in 1868	Johnson; Massac; Pope
Jonathan C. Willis	Republican	January 4, 1869 – January 4, 1871	26th	Elected in 1868; Was not re-elected in 1870	Johnson; Massac; Pope
William R. Brown	Republican	January 4, 1871 – January 8, 1873	27th	Elected in 1870; Was not re-elected in 1872	Massac; Pulaski
District abolished with 1872 Reapportionment as 3 Representatives were now elected cumulatively from Legislative districts.

=== 1957 – 1973 ===
Representative	Party	Party Control	Years (Note: Since 1970, the GA meets on the second Wednesday of January for a new session.)	General Assembly (GA)	Electoral history	Counties represented
2nd Representative district established in 1957.
Terrel E. Clarke	Republican	2 Republicans; 1 Democrat	January 9, 1957 – January 6, 1965	70th 71st 72nd 73rd	Elected in 1956; Re-elected in 1958; Re-elected in 1960; Re-elected in 1962; Re-elected to At-large district	Cook County
Harold A. Hoover	Republican	2 Republicans; 1 Democrat	January 9, 1957 – March 8, 1962	70th 71st 72nd	Elected in 1956; Re-elected in 1958; Re-elected in 1960; Passed away on March 8, 1962	Cook County
Frank X. Downey	Democratic	2 Republicans; 1 Democrat	January 9, 1957 – January 6, 1965	70th 71st 72nd 73rd	Elected in 1956; Re-elected in 1958; Re-elected in 1960; Re-elected in 1962; Re-elected to At-large district	Cook County
1 Vacancy		1 Republican; 1 Democrat	March 8, 1962 – ???	72nd		Cook County
Don A. Moore	Republican	2 Republicans; 1 Democrat	January 9, 1963 – January 6, 1965	73rd	Elected in 1962; Re-elected to At-large district	Cook County
The district was temporarily abolished from 1965 to 1967 due to the Redistricting Commission in 1963 failing to reach an agreement. An at-large election was held electing 177 Representatives from across the state.
Richard A. Walsh	Republican	2 Republicans; 1 Democrat	January 4, 1967 – January 10, 1973	75th 76th 77th	Elected in 1966; Re-elected in 1968; Re-elected in 1970; Re-districted to the 5th district	Cook County
Edward Bluthardt	Republican	2 Republicans; 1 Democrat	January 4, 1967 – January 10, 1973	75th 76th 77th	Elected in 1966; Re-elected in 1968; Re-elected in 1970; Re-districted to the 5th Legislative district and won re-election in 1972	Cook County
James Kirie	Democratic	2 Republicans; 1 Democrat	January 4, 1967 – January 13, 1971	75th 76th	Re-districted from At-large district and re-elected in 1966; Re-elected in 1968; Retired and served as commissioner for the Metropolitan Water Reclamation District of Greater Chicago	Cook County
Raymond J. Welsh, Jr.	Democratic	2 Republicans; 1 Democrat	January 13, 1971 – January 10, 1973	77th	Elected in 1970; Ran for Illinois Senate 21st district in 1972 and won	Cook County
District abolished with 1971 Reapportionment as Representatives were once again elected from Legislative districts.

=== 1983 – present ===
Representative	Party	Years	General Assembly (GA)	Electoral history	Counties represented
Representatives were now elected one per district with the passage of the Cutback Amendment
William Laurino	Democratic	January 12, 1983 – January 13, 1993	83rd 84th 85th 86th 87th	Redistricted from 15th district and won re-election in 1982; Re-elected in 1984; Re-elected in 1986; Re-elected in 1988; Re-elected in 1990; Redistricted to 15th district and won re-election in 1992.	Cook
Benjamin A. "Ben" Martinez	Democratic	January 13, 1993 – ???	88th 89th	Redistricted from 20th district and won re-election in 1992; Re-elected in 1994; Out of office before 1996 election	Cook
Edward Acevedo	Democratic	January 8, 1997 – January 10, 2017	90th 91st 92nd 93rd 94th 95th 96th 97th 98th 99th	Elected in 1996; Re-elected in 1998; Re-elected in 2000; Re-elected in 2002; Re-elected in 2004; Re-elected in 2006; Re-elected in 2008; Re-elected in 2010; Re-elected in 2012; Re-elected in 2014; Retired	Cook
Theresa Mah	Democratic	January 10, 2017 – January 11, 2023	100th 101st 102nd	Elected in 2016; Re-elected in 2018; Re-elected in 2020; Re-districted to the 24th district and won re-election in 2022.	Cook
Elizabeth Hernandez	Democratic	January 11, 2023 – present	103rd	Redistricted from the 24th district and elected in 2022	Cook

== Historic district boundaries ==
Years	County	Municipalities/Townships	Notes
2023 – present	Cook	Berwyn, Brookfield, Chicago (Garfield Ridge), Cicero, Lyons, McCook, Riverside, Stickney, Summit	
2013 – 2023	Cook	Chicago (Armour Square, Bridgeport, Brighton Park, Lower West Side, McKinley Park, Near South Side, Near West Side, and New City)	
2003 – 2013	Cook	Chicago	
1993 – 2003	Cook	Chicago	
1983 – 1993	Cook	Chicago	
1967 – 1973	Cook	Leyden Township, Norwood Park Township, parts of Oak Park Township, River Forest Township	
1957 – 1965	Cook	Bremen Township, Lemont Township, Lyons Township, Orland Township, Palos Township, parts of Stickney Township, Worth Township	
1871 – 1873	Massac; Pulaski	Ash Ridge, Brooklyn, Burkeville, Fort Massac, Grand Chain (New Grand Chain), Hickory Grove, Hillerman, Junction, Metropolis, New Columbia, Mound City, North Caledonia, Pellonia, Pulaski, Ullin, Unionville, Villa Ridge, Wetaug	
1863 – 1871	Johnson; Massac; Pope	Bay City, Big Bay, Brooklin, Georges Creek, Golconda, Hamletsburg, Hillerman, Metropolis, Morgantown, New Liberty, Oakstown, Reynoldsburg, Rock Quarry, Stonefort, Vienna, Webster	
1849 – 1863	Hardin; Massac; Pope	Belgrade, Bay City, Bay (Big Bay), Cave-In-Rock, Elizabethtown, Georges Creek, Golconda, Hillerman, Marthas, Massac, McCormick Settlement (McCormick), Metropolis, New Liberty, Oakton, Pond Slough, Rock Quarry, Rosiclare, Twitchell's Mill,	

== Electoral history ==
=== 2030 — 2022 ===
2022 Illinois House of Representatives election
Party	Candidate	Votes	%
Democratic	Elizabeth "Lisa" Hernandez	16,412	100.0
Total votes		16,412	100.0

=== 2020 – 2012 ===
2020 Illinois House of Representatives election
Party	Candidate	Votes	%	±%
Democratic	Theresa Mah (incumbent)	25,771	100.0	N/A
Total votes		25,771	100.0	

2018 Illinois House of Representatives election
Party	Candidate	Votes	%	±%
Democratic	Theresa Mah (incumbent)	20,455	100.0	N/A
Total votes		20,455	100.0	

2016 Illinois House of Representatives election
Party	Candidate	Votes	%	±%
Democratic	Theresa Mah	23,813	100.0	N/A
Total votes		23,813	100.0	

2014 Illinois House of Representatives election
Party	Candidate	Votes	%	±%
Democratic	Edward J. Acevedo (incumbent)	12,081	100.0	+0.05%
Total votes		12,081	100.0	

2012 Illinois House of Representatives election
Party	Candidate	Votes	%	±%
Democratic	Edward J. Acevedo (incumbent)	18,559	99.95	−0.05%
Write-in		10	0.05	N/A
Total votes		18,569	100.0	

=== 2010 – 2002 ===
2010 Illinois House of Representatives election
Party	Candidate	Votes	%	±%
Democratic	Edward J. Acevedo (incumbent)	10,711	100.0	+17.12%
Total votes		10,711	100.0	

2008 Illinois House of Representatives election
Party	Candidate	Votes	%	±%
Democratic	Edward J. Acevedo (incumbent)	16,327	82.88	−17.12%
Green	Ante "Tony" Marijan	3372	17.12	N/A
Total votes		19,699	100.0	

2006 Illinois House of Representatives election
Party	Candidate	Votes	%	±%
Democratic	Edward J. Acevedo (incumbent)	12,001	100.0	N/A
Total votes		12,001	100.0	

2004 Illinois House of Representatives election
Party	Candidate	Votes	%	±%
Democratic	Edward J. Acevedo (incumbent)	14,462	100.0	+16.81%
Total votes		14,462	100.0	

2002 Illinois House of Representatives election
Party	Candidate	Votes	%	±%
Democratic	Edward J. Acevedo (incumbent)	11,052	83.19	−16.81%
Republican	George J. Preski	2234	16.81	N/A
Total votes		13,286	100.0	

=== 2000 – 1992 ===
2000 Illinois House of Representatives election
Party	Candidate	Votes	%	±%
Democratic	Edward J. Acevedo (incumbent)	11,489	100.0	N/A
Total votes		11,489	100.0	

1998 Illinois House of Representatives election
Party	Candidate	Votes	%	±%
Democratic	Edward J. Acevedo (incumbent)	7,019	100.0	+16.42%
Total votes		7,019	100.0	

1996 Illinois House of Representatives election
Party	Candidate	Votes	%	±%
Democratic	Edward Acevedo	10,274	83.58	+8.61%
Republican	Nancy Mercado	2017	16.41	−8.61%
Total votes		12,291	100.0	

1994 Illinois House of Representatives election
Party	Candidate	Votes	%	±%
Democratic	Benjamin A. "Ben" Martinez (incumbent)	5,950	74.97	−1.70%
Republican	George J. Preski	1986	25.02	+1.70%
Total votes		7,936	100.0	

1992 Illinois House of Representatives election
Party	Candidate	Votes	%	±%
Democratic	Benjamin A. "Ben" Martinez (incumbent)	10,262	76.67	−23.33%
Republican	George J. Preski	3122	23.32	N/A
Total votes		13,384	100.0	

=== 1990 – 1982 ===
1990 Illinois House of Representatives election
Party	Candidate	Votes	%	±%
Democratic	William J. Laurino (incumbent)	17,620	100.0	+32.85%
Total votes		17,620	100.0	

1988 Illinois House of Representatives election
Party	Candidate	Votes	%	±%
Democratic	William J. Laurino (incumbent)	22,661	67.15	−5.17%
Republican	Anthony J. Barango, Jr.	11,083	32.84	+5.17%
Total votes		33,744	100.0	

1986 Illinois House of Representatives election
Party	Candidate	Votes	%	±%
Democratic	William J. Laurino (incumbent)	19,249	72.32	+9.69%
Republican	Fawn V. Hurst	7,365	27.67	−9.70%
Total votes		26,614	100.0	

1984 Illinois House of Representatives election
Party	Candidate	Votes	%	±%
Democratic	William J. Laurino (incumbent)	22,824	62.63	−37.36%
Republican	Kenneth R. Hurst	13,618	37.37	N/A
Total votes		36,442	100.0	

1982 Illinois House of Representatives election
Party	Candidate	Votes	%
Democratic	William J. Laurino (incumbent)	26,095	99.99
Write-in		2	0.01
Total votes		26,097	100.0

=== 1970 – 1962 ===
1970 Illinois House of Representatives election
Party	Candidate	Votes	%
Republican	Edward E. Bluthardt (incumbent)	57,715	35.80
Democratic	Raymond J. Welsh, Jr.	55,289	34.29
Republican	Richard A. Walsh (incumbent)	48,211.5	29.90
Democratic	Ray Willas	34,937	21.67
Write-in		7	0.00
Total votes		161,222.5	100.0

1968 Illinois House of Representatives election
Party	Candidate	Votes	%
Republican	Richard A. Walsh (incumbent)	79,507.5	32.12
Republican	Edward E. Bluthardt (incumbent)	63,746.5	25.75
Democratic	James C. Kirie (incumbent)	59,619.5	24.09
Democratic	Robert F. Martwick [Sr.]	44,642.5	18.04
Total votes		247,516	100.0

1966 Illinois House of Representatives election
Party	Candidate	Votes	%
Republican	Richard A. Walsh	70,792	33.44
Republican	Edward E. Bluthardt	60,378.5	28.52
Democratic	James C. Kirie (incumbent)	46,350	21.89
Democratic	Raymond J. Welsh, Jr.	34,200	16.15
Total votes		211,720.5	100.0

1962 Illinois House of Representatives election
Party	Candidate	Votes	%
Republican	Terrel E. Clarke (incumbent)	94,400.5	31.05
Republican	Don A. Moore	86,773.5	28.54
Democratic	Frank X. Downey (incumbent)	63,643.5	20.93
Democratic	Harold W. Mance	59,188.5	19.47
Total votes		304,006	100.0

=== 1960 – 1956 ===
1960 Illinois House of Representatives election
Party	Candidate	Votes	%
Republican	Terrell E. Clarke [sic] (incumbent)	112,854	29.28
Republican	Harold A. Hoover (incumbent)	98,703	25.61
Democratic	Frank X. Downey (incumbent)	94,169.5	24.43
Democratic	John P. Dohm	79,714	20.68
Total votes		385,440.5	100.0

1958 Illinois House of Representatives election
Party	Candidate	Votes	%
Republican	Terrel E. Clarke (incumbent)	65,860	28.94
Democratic	Frank X. Downey (incumbent)	57,888	25.44
Republican	Harold A. Hoover (incumbent)	57,185.5	25.13
Democratic	Clara C. Smollen	55,650	24.45
Total votes		227,583.5	100.0

1956 Illinois House of Representatives election
Party	Candidate	Votes	%
Republican	Terrel E. Clarke	93,427.5	32.15
Republican	Harold A. Hoover	88,282.5	30.38
Democratic	Frank X. Downey	58,337	20.07
Democratic	Galvin Kennedy	50,590.5	17.41
Total votes		290,637.5	100.0
