= 2026 Illinois House of Representatives election =

- November 3, 2026

All 118 seats in the Illinois House of Representatives 60 seats needed for a majority
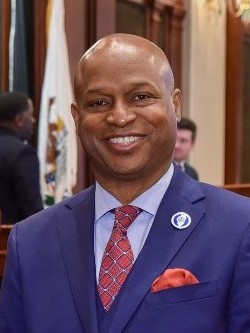

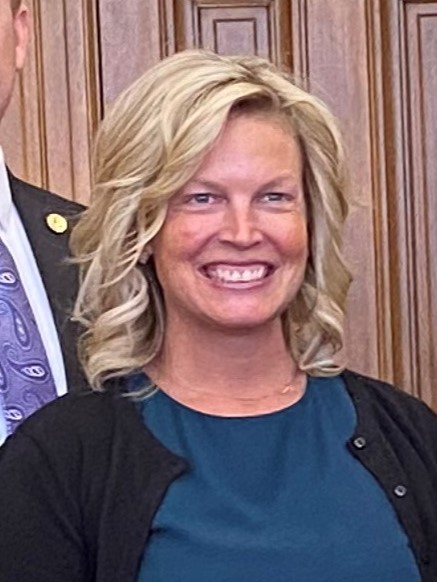
	Majority party	Minority party
Leader	Emanuel "Chris" Welch	Tony McCombie
Party	Democratic	Republican
Leader's seat	7th	89th
Last election	78	40
Seats won	84	34
Seat change	▲6	▼6
- Democratic incumbent Democratic incumbent retiring Republican incumbent Republican incumbent retiring
Speaker before election
Emanuel "Chris" Welch
Democratic
Elected Speaker
TBD

The 2026 Illinois House of Representatives election was held on November 3, 2026, to elect all 118 members of the Illinois House of Representatives.

== Retirements ==
=== Democratic ===
1. District 8: La Shawn Ford is retiring to run for U.S. Representative in Illinois's 7th congressional district.
2. District 12: Margaret Croke is retiring to run for comptroller of Illinois.
3. District 13: Hoan Huynh is retiring to run for U.S. Representative in Illinois's 9th congressional district.
4. District 42: Terra Costa Howard is retiring to serve as a circuit judge in Illinois's Eighteenth Judicial Circuit Court.
5. District 51: Nabeela Syed is retiring to run for state senator in District 26.
6. District 55: Marty Moylan is retiring.
7. District 84: Stephanie Kifowit is retiring to run for comptroller of Illinois.

=== Republican ===
1. District 47: Amy Grant is retiring.
2. District 105: Dennis Tipsword is retiring to run for Woodford County sheriff.
3. District 118: Paul Jacobs is retiring to run for state senator in District 59.

== Predictions ==
Source	Ranking	As of
Sabato's Crystal Ball	Safe D	January 22, 2026
State Navigate	Safe D	October 20, 2026

== District 1 ==
The incumbent is Democrat Aaron Ortiz, who has not yet stated if he will run for re-election in 2026.

Democratic primary results
Party	Candidate	Votes	%
Democratic	Aaron M. Ortiz (incumbent)	4,746	64.52
Democratic	Guadalupe Rivera	2,610	35.48
Total votes		7,356	100.0

== District 2 ==
The incumbent is Democrat Elizabeth Hernandez, who has not yet stated if she will run for re-election in 2026.

Democratic primary results
Party	Candidate	Votes	%
Democratic	Elizabeth Hernandez (incumbent)	9,480	100.0
Total votes		9,480	100.0

Republican primary results
Party	Candidate	Votes	%
Republican	Laura Hruska	1,371	100.0
Total votes		1,371	100.0

== District 3 ==
The incumbent is Democrat Eva-Dina Delgado, who has not yet stated if she will run for re-election in 2026.

Democratic primary results
Party	Candidate	Votes	%
Democratic	Eva-Dina Delgado (incumbent)	10,244	100.0
Total votes		10,244	100.0

== District 4 ==
The incumbent is Democrat Lilian Jiménez, who has not yet stated if she will run for re-election in 2026.

Democratic primary results
Party	Candidate	Votes	%
Democratic	Lilian Jiménez (incumbent)	9,726	88.99
Democratic	Kirk Ortiz	1,203	11.01
Total votes		10,929	100.0

== District 5 ==
The incumbent is Democrat Kimberly du Buclet, who has not yet stated if she will run for re-election in 2026.

Democratic primary results
Party	Candidate	Votes	%
Democratic	Kimberly du Buclet (incumbent)	12,943	100
Total votes		12,943	100.0

== District 6 ==
The incumbent is Democrat Sonya Harper, who has not yet stated if she will run for re-election in 2026.

Democratic primary results
Party	Candidate	Votes	%
Democratic	Sonya Harper (incumbent)	8,628	100
Total votes		8,628	100.0

== District 7 ==
The incumbent is Democrat Chris Welch, who has not yet stated if he will run for re-election in 2026.

Democratic primary results
Party	Candidate	Votes	%
Democratic	Chris Welch (incumbent)	15,142	100
Total votes		15,142	100.0

== District 8 ==
The incumbent is Democrat La Shawn Ford, who is retiring to run for the U.S. House of Representatives in Illinois's 7th congressional district.

Democratic primary results
Party	Candidate	Votes	%
Democratic	Shantel Franklin	6,406	46.25
Democratic	Latonya Mitts	3,561	25.71
Democratic	Jill Bush	2,241	16.18
Democratic	John Harrell	1,644	11.87
Total votes		13,852	100.0

== District 9 ==
The incumbent is Democrat Yolonda Morris, who has not yet stated if she will run for re-election in 2026.

== District 10 ==
The incumbent is Democrat Jawaharial Williams, who is running for re-election.

== District 11 ==
The incumbent is Democrat Ann Williams, who has not yet stated if she will run for re-election in 2026.

== District 12 ==
The incumbent is Democrat Margaret Croke, who is retiring to run for comptroller of Illinois.

=== Democratic primary ===
==== Candidates ====
===== Declared =====
- Litcy Ludvic Kurisinkal, Local School Council Chair
- Karim Lakhani, Chief Development Officer of Lakhani Hospitality
- Paul Kendrick, Lincoln Park High School Local Council
- Mac Lebuhn, Senior Policy Advisor

Democratic primary results
Party	Candidate	Votes	%
Democratic	Paul Kendrick	8,719	47.54
Democratic	Litcy Ludvic Kurisinkal	4,360	23.77
Democratic	Karim Lakhani	3,004	16.38
Democratic	Mac Lebuhn	2,259	12.32
Total votes		18,342	100.0

=== Republican primary ===
==== Candidates ====
===== Declared =====
- Justin J. Kumar, Board Member of the Lupus Society of Illinois

Republican primary results
Party	Candidate	Votes	%
Republican	Justin J. Kumar	971	100
Total votes		971	100.0

== District 13 ==
The incumbent is Democrat Hoan Huynh, who is retiring to run for the U.S. House of Representatives in Illinois's 9th congressional district.

Democratic primary results
Party	Candidate	Votes	%
Democratic	Demerike Palecek	11,367	42.68
Democratic	James O'Brien	7,229	27.14
Democratic	Sunjay Kumar	3,565	13.39
Democratic	Adam Braun	2,915	10.95
Democratic	Ridge Knapp	1,557	5.85
Total votes		26,633	100.0

Republican primary results
Party	Candidate	Votes	%
Republican	Terry Nguyen Le	639	100.0
Total votes		639	100.0

== District 14 ==
The incumbent is Democrat Kelly Cassidy, who has not yet stated if she will run for re-election in 2026.

== District 15 ==
The incumbent is Democrat Michael Kelly, who has not yet stated if he will run for re-election in 2026.

== District 16 ==
The incumbent is Democrat Kevin Olickal, who has not yet stated if he will run for re-election in 2026.

== District 17 ==
The incumbent is Democrat Jennifer Gong-Gershowitz, who has not yet stated if she will run for re-election in 2026.

== District 18 ==
The incumbent is Democrat Robyn Gabel, who has not yet stated if she will run for re-election in 2026.

== District 19 ==
The incumbent is Democrat Lindsey LaPointe, who has not yet stated if she will run for re-election in 2026.

== District 20 ==
The incumbent is Republican Bradley Stephens, who has not yet stated if he will run for re-election in 2026.

== District 21 ==
The incumbent is Democrat Abdelnasser Rashid, who has not yet stated if he will run for re-election in 2026.

== District 22 ==
The incumbent is Democrat Angelica Guerrero-Cuellar, who has not yet stated if she will run for re-election in 2026.

== District 23 ==
The incumbent is Democrat Edgar Gonzalez Jr., who has not yet stated if he will run for re-election in 2026.

== District 24 ==
The incumbent is Democrat Theresa Mah, who has not yet stated if she will run for re-election in 2026.

== District 25 ==
The incumbent is Democrat Curtis Tarver, who has not yet stated if he will run for re-election in 2026.

=== Republican primary ===
==== Candidates ====
===== Declared =====
- Antoinette Jewel Simmons

== District 26 ==
The incumbent is Democrat Kam Buckner, who is running for re-election.

== District 27 ==
The incumbent is Democrat Justin Slaughter, who has not yet stated if he will run for re-election in 2026.

== District 28 ==
The incumbent is Democrat Robert Rita, who is running for re-election.

=== Democratic primary ===
==== Candidates ====
===== Declared =====
- Robert Rita, incumbent state representative
- Dyvonna A. Moss
- Nadeja A. Henry
- Paris Walker Thomas, sales marketing manager

== District 29 ==
The incumbent is Democrat Thaddeus Jones, who has not yet stated if he will run for re-election in 2026.

== District 30 ==
The incumbent is Democrat Will Davis, who has not yet stated if he will run for re-election in 2026.

== District 31 ==
The incumbent is Democrat Michael Crawford, who has not yet stated if he will run for re-election in 2026.

== District 32 ==
The incumbent is Democrat Lisa Davis, who has not yet stated if she will run for re-election in 2026.

== District 33 ==
The incumbent is Democrat Marcus C. Evans Jr., who has not yet stated if he will run for re-election in 2026.

== District 34 ==
The incumbent is Democrat Nicholas Smith, who has not yet stated if he will run for re-election in 2026.

== District 35 ==
The incumbent is Democrat Mary Gill, who has not yet stated if she will run for re-election in 2026.

== District 36 ==
The incumbent is Democrat Rick Ryan, who has not yet stated if he will run for re-election in 2026.

== District 37 ==
The incumbent is Republican Patrick Sheehan, who was appointed to the Illinois House of Representatives in April 2024, succeeding Tim Ozinga. Sheehan is running for re-election.

== District 38 ==
The incumbent is Democrat Debbie Meyers-Martin, who has not yet stated if she will run for re-election in 2026.

== District 39 ==
The incumbent is Democrat Will Guzzardi, who has not yet stated if he will run for re-election in 2026.

== District 40 ==
The incumbent is Democrat Jaime Andrade Jr., who has not yet stated if he will run for re-election in 2026.

== District 41 ==
The incumbent is Democrat Janet Yang Rohr, who has not yet stated if she will run for re-election in 2026.

== District 42 ==
The incumbent is Democrat Margaret DeLaRosa who was appointed to replace Terra Costa Howard, who resigned to serve as a circuit judge in Illinois's Eighteenth Judicial Circuit Court." She defeated DuPage County Board Member Lynn LaPlante in the primary.

Democratic primary results
Party	Candidate	Votes	%
Democratic	Margaret A. Delarosa	9,396	58.86
Democratic	Lynn LaPlante	6,568	41.14
Total votes		15,964	100.0

Republican primary results
Party	Candidate	Votes	%
Republican	Stephanie W. Trussell	5,259	100.0
Total votes		5,259	100.0

== District 43 ==
The incumbent is Democrat Anna Moeller, who is running for re-election.

== District 44 ==
The incumbent is Democrat Fred Crespo, who has not yet stated if he will run for re-election in 2026.

== District 45 ==
The incumbent is Democrat Martha Deuter, who has not yet stated if she will run for re-election in 2026.

== District 46 ==
The incumbent is Democrat Diane Blair-Sherlock, who has not yet stated if she will run for re-election in 2026.

== District 47 ==
The incumbent is Republican Amy Grant, who is retiring.

Democratic primary results
Party	Candidate	Votes	%
Democratic	Erica Bray-Parker	12,266	100.0
Total votes		12,266	100.0

Republican primary results
Party	Candidate	Votes	%
Republican	Robert A. Vrankovich	6,866	100.0
Total votes		6,866	100.0

== District 48 ==
The incumbent is Republican Jennifer Sanalitro, who has not yet stated if she will run for re-election in 2026.

== District 49 ==
The incumbent is Democrat Maura Hirschauer, who has not yet stated if she will run for re-election in 2026.

== District 50 ==
The incumbent is Democrat Barbara Hernandez, who has not yet stated if she will run for re-election in 2026.

== District 51 ==
The incumbent is Democratic Nabeela Syed, who is retiring to run for state senator in District 26.

Democratic primary results
Party	Candidate	Votes	%
Democratic	Jenny Levin	10,796	100.0
Total votes		10,796	100.0

Republican primary results
Party	Candidate	Votes	%
Republican	Lori Smith	3,403	100.0
Total votes		3,403	100.0

== District 52 ==
The incumbent is Republican Martin McLaughlin, who is running for re-election. He will be challenged by Democrat Maria Peterson.

== District 53 ==
The incumbent is Democrat Nicolle Grasse, who has not yet stated if she will run for re-election in 2026.

== District 54 ==
The incumbent is Democrat Mary Beth Canty, who is running for re-election.

== District 55 ==
The incumbent is Democrat Marty Moylan, who is retiring.

Democratic primary results
Party	Candidate	Votes	%
Democratic	Justin Cochran	8,811	100.0
Total votes		8,811	100.0

Republican primary results
Party	Candidate	Votes	%
Republican	Joseph Johnson	2,507	100.0
Total votes		2,507	100.0

== District 56 ==
The incumbent is Democrat Michelle Mussman, who has not yet stated if she will run for re-election in 2026.

== District 57 ==
The incumbent is Democrat Tracy Katz Muhl, who has not yet stated if she will run for re-election in 2026.

== District 58 ==
The incumbent is Democrat Bob Morgan, who has not yet stated if he will run for re-election in 2026.

== District 59 ==
The incumbent is Democrat Daniel Didech, who has not yet stated if he will run for re-election in 2026.

== District 60 ==
The incumbent is Democrat Rita Mayfield, who has not yet stated if she will run for re-election in 2026.

== District 61 ==
The incumbent is Democrat Joyce Mason, who has not yet stated if she will run for re-election in 2026.

== District 62 ==
The incumbent is Democrat Laura Faver Dias, who has not yet stated if she will run for re-election in 2026.

== District 63 ==
The incumbent is Republican Steve Reick, who is running for re-election.

== District 64 ==
The incumbent is Republican Tom Weber, who has not yet stated if he will run for re-election in 2026.

== District 65 ==
The incumbent is Republican Dan Ugaste, who is running for re-election.

== District 66 ==
The incumbent is Democrat Suzanne Ness, who has not yet stated if she will run for re-election in 2026.

== District 67 ==
The incumbent is Democrat Maurice West, who is running for re-election.

== District 68 ==
The incumbent is Democrat Dave Vella, who is running for re-election.

== District 69 ==
The incumbent is Republican Joe Sosnowski, who has not yet stated if he will run for re-election in 2026.

== District 70 ==
The incumbent is Republican Jeff Keicher, who is running for re-election.

== District 71 ==
The incumbent is Republican Daniel Swanson, who is running for re-election. Kermit Thomas is the presumptive Democratic nominee

== District 72 ==
The incumbent is Democrat Gregg Johnson, He will run for re-election in 2026.

== District 73 ==
The incumbent is Republican Ryan Spain, who is running for re-election.

== District 74 ==
The incumbent is Republican Bradley Fritts, who is running for re-election.

== District 75 ==
The incumbent is Republican Jed Davis, who is running for re-election.

== District 76 ==
The incumbent is Democrat Murri Briel, who is running for re-election.

=== Democratic primary ===
==== Candidates ====
===== Declared =====
- Murri Briel, incumbent State Representative

=== Republican primary ===
==== Candidates ====
===== Declared =====
- Liz Bishop, resident of LaSalle, Illinois
- Crystal Loughran, resident of Peru, Illinois

== District 77 ==
The incumbent is Democrat Norma Hernandez, who has not yet stated if she will run for re-election in 2026.

== District 78 ==
The incumbent is Democrat Camille Lilly, who has not yet stated if she will run for re-election in 2026.

== District 79 ==
The incumbent is Republican Jackie Haas, who has not yet stated if she will run for re-election in 2026.

== District 80 ==
The incumbent is Democrat Anthony DeLuca, who is running for re-election.

== District 81 ==
The incumbent is Democrat Anne Stava-Murray, who has not yet stated if she will run for re-election in 2026.

== District 82 ==
The incumbent is Republican Nicole La Ha, who has not yet stated if she will run for re-election in 2026.

== District 83 ==
The incumbent is Democrat Matt Hanson, who has not yet stated if he will run for re-election in 2026.

== District 84 ==
The incumbent is Democrat Stephanie Kifowit, who is retiring to run for comptroller of Illinois.

Democratic primary results
Party	Candidate	Votes	%
Democratic	Saba Haider	6,601	63.5
Democratic	Jared Ploger	3,794	36.5
Total votes		10,395	100.0

Republican primary results
Party	Candidate	Votes	%
Republican	Brian Scopa	2,794	100
Total votes		2,794	100.0

== District 85 ==
The incumbent is Democrat Dagmara Avelar, who has not yet stated if she will run for re-election in 2026.

== District 86 ==
The incumbent is Democrat Lawrence M. Walsh Jr., who has not yet stated if he will run for re-election in 2026.

== District 87 ==
The incumbent is Republican Bill Hauter, who has not yet stated if he will run for re-election in 2026.

== District 88 ==
The incumbent is Republican Regan Deering, who is running for re-election.

== District 89 ==
The incumbent is Republican Tony McCombie, who is running for re-election.

== District 90 ==
The incumbent is Republican John Cabello, who is running for re-election.

== District 91 ==
The incumbent is Democrat Sharon Chung, who has not yet stated if she will run for re-election in 2026.

== District 92 ==
The incumbent is Democrat Jehan Gordon-Booth, who has not yet stated if she will run for re-election in 2026.

== District 93 ==
The incumbent is Republican Travis Weaver, who has not yet stated if he will run for re-election in 2026.

== District 94 ==
The incumbent is Republican Norine Hammond, who is running for re-election.

=== Republican primary ===
==== Candidates ====
===== Declared =====
- Norine Hammond, incumbent state representative
- Joshua S. Higgins, member of the West Central School Board
- Bailey Templeton, state organizer for You Are The Power

== District 95 ==
The incumbent is Republican Michael Coffey, who has not yet stated if he will run for re-election in 2026.

== District 96 ==
The incumbent is Democrat Sue Scherer, who has not yet stated if she will run for re-election in 2026.

== District 97 ==
The incumbent is Democrat Harry Benton, who has not yet stated if he will run for re-election in 2026.

== District 98 ==
The incumbent is Democrat Natalie Manley, who has not yet stated if she will run for re-election in 2026.

== District 99 ==
The incumbent is Republican Kyle Moore, who is running for re-election.

== District 100 ==
The incumbent is Republican C. D. Davidsmeyer, who is running for re-election.

== District 101 ==
The incumbent is Republican Chris Miller, who is running for re-election.

=== Democratic primary ===
==== Candidates ====
===== Declared =====
- Douglas Fagan

== District 102 ==
The incumbent is Republican Adam Niemerg, who has not yet stated if he will run for re-election in 2026.

== District 103 ==
The incumbent is Democrat Carol Ammons, who has not yet stated if she will run for re-election in 2026.

== District 104 ==
The incumbent is Republican Brandun Schweizer, who is running for re-election

=== Democratic primary ===
==== Candidates ====
===== Declared =====
- Mary Catherine Roberson

== District 105 ==
The incumbent is Republican Dennis Tipsword, who is retiring to run for Woodford County sheriff.

=== Republican primary ===
==== Candidates ====
===== Nominee =====
- Tim Ruestman, Woodford County Coroner

Republican primary results
Party	Candidate	Votes	%
Republican	Tim Ruestman	8,617	100.0
Total votes		8,617	100.0

=== Democratic primary ===
==== Candidates ====
===== Declared =====
- Lisa Diana Tejeda

== District 106 ==
The incumbent is Republican Jason Bunting, who is running for re-election.

== District 107 ==
The incumbent is Republican Brad Halbrook, who is running for re-election.

=== Republican primary ===
==== Candidates ====
===== Declared =====
- Brad Halbrook, incumbent state representative
- John Hauge, engineer

== District 108 ==
The incumbent is Republican Wayne Rosenthal, who is running for re-election.

== District 109 ==
The incumbent is Republican Charles Meier, who is running for re-election.

=== Republican primary ===
==== Candidates ====
===== Declared =====
- Charles Meier, incumbent state representative
- Zachary Meyer, attorney

== District 110 ==
The incumbent is Republican Blaine Wilhour, who is running for re-election.

== District 111 ==
The incumbent is Republican Amy Elik, who is running for re-election.

=== Democratic primary ===
==== Candidates ====
===== Declared =====
- Rosetta Brown, Alton Alderwoman of the Fourth Ward

== District 112 ==
The incumbent is Democrat Katie Stuart, who has not yet stated if she will run for re-election in 2026.

== District 113 ==
The incumbent is Democrat Jay Hoffman, who has not yet stated if he will run for re-election in 2026.

== District 114 ==
The incumbent is Republican Kevin Schmidt, who has not yet stated if he will run for re-election in 2026.

=== Democratic primary ===
==== Candidates ====
===== Declared =====
- George McClellan, Jr.

== District 115 ==
The incumbent is Republican David Friess, who has not yet stated if he will run for re-election in 2026.

== District 116 ==
The incumbent is Republican Dave Severin, who has not yet stated if he will run for re-election in 2026.

== District 117 ==
The incumbent is Republican Patrick Windhorst, who has not yet stated if he will run for re-election in 2026.

== District 118 ==
The incumbent is Republican Paul Jacobs, who is retiring to run for state senator in District 59. Jacobs resigned to be appointed to the Illinois State Senate and was replaced by Scott Doody, who had won the Republican primary for the general election.

=== Republican primary ===
==== Candidates ====
===== Declared =====
- Scott Doody, Former Radio Host
- Dayton Loyd, Former Military Veteran
- Harold J. Visser

==== Withdrawn ====
- Joe DeBose, Former Illinois Army National Guard

=== Democratic primary ===
==== Candidates ====
===== Declared =====
- Chip Markel, Former Military Veteran
