= United Working Families =

American political organization

- Formation: 2014
- Headquarters: Chicago, Illinois
- Chair: Stacy Davis Gates
- Vice-Chair: Abbie Illenberger
- Executive Director: Kennedy Bartley

United Working Families (UWF) is an independent political organization based in Chicago, Illinois. It was formed in 2014 as a coalition between the Chicago Teachers Union, SEIU Healthcare Illinois Indiana, Grassroots Illinois Action, and Action Now. Although it is not a formal political party, the organization recruits and trains political candidates and organizers, endorses and provides support to political candidates, and engages in community organizing. Its stated goal is to "create space for independent politics" in Chicago and Illinois and to enact a "vision for a city and a state that provides for the many, not just the wealthy few." The organization has been characterized as part of the progressive movement and the labor movement.

== Electoral politics ==
=== Municipal elections ===
==== 2015 Chicago municipal elections ====
In 2015, UWF backed the candidacy of Jesus "Chuy" Garcia against incumbent mayor Rahm Emanuel. Garcia placed second in the first round and proceeded to the run-off election, where he lost to Emanuel.

The below table shows the candidates endorsed by UWF in the 2015 Chicago aldermanic election.

Candidates endorsed by UWF in 2015 Chicago aldermanic election
Candidate	Ward	Status	Result	Percentage of votes won
Leslie Hairston	5	Incumbent	Won in first round	52.55%
Roderick Sawyer	6	Incumbent	Won in first round	56.2%
Tara Baldridge	8	Challenger	Lost in first round	15.67%
Susan Sadlowski-Garza	10	Challenger	Won in run-off	50.09% (run-off); 24.09% (first round)
Toni Foulkes	16	Incumbent (Note: Foulkes was previously the alderman of the 15th ward, but ran in the 16th ward due to redistricting.)	Won in run-off	50.94% (run-off); 47.65% (first round)
David Moore	17	Open seat	Won in first round	52.93%
Ricardo Muñoz	22	Incumbent	Won in first round	57.65%
Juanita Izirray	26	Challenger	Lost in first round	33.89%
Zerlina Smith	29	Challenger	Lost in first round	4.66%
Scott Waugespack	32	Incumbent	Won in first round	78.95%
Tim Meegan	33	Challenger	Lost in first round	34.01%
Carlos Ramirez-Rosa	35	Challenger	Won in first round	67.26%
Tara Stamps	37	Challenger	Lost in run-off	46.99% (run-off); 32.13% (first round)
Nicholas Sposato	38	Incumbent (Note: Sposato was previously the alderman of the 36th ward, but ran in the 38th ward due to redistricting.)	Won in first round	53.58%
John Arena	45	Incumbent	Won in run-off	53.89% (run-off); 45.46% (first round)

==== 2019 Chicago municipal elections ====
UWF did not make an endorsement in the 2019 mayoral election, but did create a digital advertisement featuring activists who critiqued candidate Lori Lightfoot for actions during her tenure as president of the Chicago Police Board. Lightfoot proceeded to win the election.

The below table shows the candidates endorsed by UWF in the 2019 Chicago aldermanic election. All endorsed candidates who won would later join the City Council's Progressive Reform Caucus.

Candidates endorsed by UWF in 2019 Chicago aldermanic election
Candidate	Ward	Status	Early endorsement	Result	Percentage of votes won
Cleopatra Watson	9	Challenger	No	Lost in first round	25.80%
Susan Sadlowski Garza	10	Incumbent	Yes	Won in first round	68.82%
Tanya Patiño	14	Challenger	No	Lost in first round	29.40%
Rafael Yañez	15	Challenger	No	Lost in run-off	40.30% (run-off); 21.83% (first round)
Jeanette Taylor	20	Open seat	Yes	Won in run-off	59.71% (run-off); 28.78% (first round)
Michael Rodríguez	22	Open seat	Yes	Won in first round	63.80%
Byron Sigcho-Lopez	25	Open seat	No (Note: Endorsed after the first round.)	Won in run-off	54.20% (run-off); 29.23% (first round)
Rossana Rodríguez Sanchez	33	Challenger	Yes	Won in run-off	50.06% (run-off); 42.05% (first round)
Carlos Ramirez-Rosa	35	Incumbent	Yes	Won in first round	59.43%
Tara Stamps	37	Challenger	No	Lost in first round	40.17%
Andre Vasquez	40	Challenger	No (Note: Endorsed after the first round.)	Won in run-off	53.87% (run-off); 20.09% (first round)
John Arena	45	Incumbent	No	Lost in first round	36.21%
Erika Wozniak Francis	46	Challenger	Yes	Lost in first round	16.84%
Matt Martin	47	Open seat	No	Won in run-off	62.50% (run-off); 39.31% (first round)
Maria Hadden	49	Challenger	Yes	Won in first round	63.37%

==== 2023 Chicago municipal elections ====
In the 2023 Chicago mayoral election, UWF endorsed challenger Brandon Johnson, who previously served on the Cook County Board of Commissioners. Chuy García, who had received UWF's endorsement for Mayor in 2015, requested a delay in the endorsement process while he made his decision about whether to enter the race, but UWF proceeded with endorsing Johnson in September 2022, citing Garcia's unwillingness to provide a timeline for his decision. Johnson was ultimately elected.

The below table shows candidates endorsed by UWF in the 2023 Chicago aldermanic election.

Candidate	Ward	Status	Result
Daniel La Spata	1	Incumbent	Won in general election
Khari Humphries	4	Open seat	Lost in general election
Desmon Yancy	5	Open seat	Won in run-off election
William Hall	6	Open seat	Won in run-off election
Cleopatra Draper	9	Challenger	Lost in general election
Oscar Sanchez	10	Open seat	Lost in general election
Julia Ramirez	12	Open seat	Won in general election
Vicko Alvarez	15	Challenger	Lost in general election
Jeanette Taylor	20	Incumbent	Won in general election
Jessie Fuentes	26	Challenger	Won in general election
Rossana Rodriguez-Sanchez	33	Incumbent	Won in general election
Carlos Ramirez-Rosa	35	Incumbent	Won in general election
Lori Torres Whitt	36	Challenger	Lost in run-off election
Denali Dasgupta	39	Challenger	Lost in general election
Angela Clay	46	Open seat	Won in run-off election
Matt Martin	47	Incumbent	Won in general election
Maria Hadden	49	Incumbent	Won in general election
Mueze Bawany	50	Challenger	Lost in general election

=== State and county elections ===
==== 2018 Illinois and Cook County elections ====
UWF endorsed the following candidates in the 2018 Illinois elections:

Candidates endorsed by UWF in 2018 Illinois and Cook County elections
Candidate	Office	Status	Result
Delia Ramirez	Illinois House of Representatives, 4th district	Open seat	Won in Democratic primary and general election
Aaron Ortiz	Illinois House of Representatives, 1st district	Challenger	Won in Democratic primary; unopposed in general election
Brandon Johnson	Cook County Board of Commissioners, 1st district	Challenger	Won in Democratic primary; unopposed in general election
Alma Anaya	Cook County Board of Commissioners, 7th district	Open seat	Won in Democratic primary; unopposed in general election

==== 2020 Illinois and Cook County elections ====
The below table shows candidates endorsed by UWF in the 2020 Illinois elections. The organization also endorsed Bernie Sanders in the Democratic Party presidential primary election.

Candidates endorsed by UWF in 2020 Illinois and Cook County elections
Candidate	Office	Status	Result
Kim Foxx	Cook County State's Attorney	Incumbent	Won in Democratic primary and general election
Celina Villanueva	Illinois Senate, 11th district (Note: Villanueva was initially endorsed when she was the incumbent State Representative for the 13th district and running for re-election in that seat. On January 7, 2020, she was appointed to fill a vacancy in the State Senate seat for 11th district.)	Incumbent	Ran unopposed in Democratic primary and general election
Robert Peters	Illinois Senate, 13th district	Incumbent	Won in Democratic primary; unopposed in general election
Aaron Ortiz	Illinois House of Representatives, 1st district	Incumbent	Won in Democratic primary; unopposed in general election
Theresa Mah	Illinois House of Representatives, 2nd district	Incumbent	Won in Democratic primary; unopposed in general election
Nidia Carranza	Illinois House of Representatives, 3rd district	Challenger	Lost in Democratic primary
Delia Ramirez	Illinois House of Representatives, 4th district	Incumbent	Ran unopposed in Democratic primary and general election
Lakesia Collins	Illinois House of Representatives, 9th district	Open seat	Won in Democratic primary; unopposed in general election
Will Guzzardi	Illinois House of Representatives, 39th district	Incumbent	Ran unopposed in Democratic primary and general election

==== 2022 Illinois and Cook County elections ====
The below table shows candidates endorsed by UWF in the 2022 Illinois elections and 2022 Cook County elections.

Candidate	Office	Status	Result
Delia Ramirez	U.S. House of Representatives, 3rd district	Open seat	Won in Democratic primary; unopposed in general election
Robert Peters	Illinois Senate, 13th district	Incumbent	Won unopposed
Celina Villanueva	Illinois Senate, 11th district	Incumbent	Won in general election
Cristina Pacione-Zayas	Illinois Senate, 20th district	Incumbent	Won in general election
Theresa Mah	Illinois House, 24th district	Incumbent	Won unopposed
Lakesia Collins	Illinois House, 9th district	Incumbent	Won unopposed
Lilian Jimenez	Illinois House, 4th district	Open seat	Won in Democratic primary and general election
Michael Rabbitt	Illinois House, 15th district	Challenger	Lost in Democratic primary
Will Guzzardi	Illinois House, 39th district	Incumbent	Won unopposed
Norma Hernandez	Illinois House, 77th district	Challenger	Won in Democratic primary and general election
Fritz Kaegi	Cook County Assessor	Incumbent	Won in Democratic primary and general election
Brandon Johnson	Cook County Board of Commissioners, 1st district	Incumbent	Won unopposed
Alma Anaya	Cook County Board of Commissioners, 7th district	Incumbent	Won unopposed
Anthony Joel Quezada	Cook County Board of Commissioners, 8th district	Challenger	Won in Democratic primary; unopposed in general election

== Policy agenda ==
In May 2019, all UWF-endorsed candidates who won in the 2019 Chicago aldermanic election (along with alderman Daniel La Spata) signed onto a legislative policy agenda entitled "Our 100 Day Plan to Reimagine Chicago." The agenda includes ordinances supporting public housing and affordable housing, a new real estate transfer tax, an increased minimum wage, a Community Benefits Agreement for the Obama Presidential Center, eliminating exemptions in Chicago's welcoming city ordinance, and reform of tax increment financing.

In November 2019, aldermen affiliated with UWF hosted a series of town halls on the city budget, in support of their proposed alternatives to Mayor Lightfoot's budget. The organization itself released a statement opposing the mayor's budget on the grounds that it lacked funding for affordable housing, failed to re-open closed mental health clinics, and did not contain sufficient progressive revenue measures. On November 26, eight of the nine UWF-endorsed aldermen voted against Lightfoot's budget proposal, which passed by a vote of 39–11.

During the COVID-19 pandemic, UWF worked with other community organizations and some local elected officials to create and endorse a "Right to Recovery" package at the city, county, and state levels. The package would include paid emergency leave, emergency housing for those unable to self-quarantine, a moratorium on Immigration and Customs Enforcement check-ins, and weekly payments of $750 to families with children and workers facing layoffs and furloughs.

On September 11, 2024, three City Council committee chairs and the president of the Fraternal Order of Police called for the firing of mayoral aide Kennedy Bartley, the former executive director of United Working Families, for using the term "f---ing pigs" to describe police and talking openly about defunding or abolishing the police.

== See also ==
- Chicago City Council Progressive Reform Caucus
