= Larry Stuffle =

American politician and lobbyist

Member of the Illinois House of Representatives from the 105th district
- In office 1983–1985
- Preceded by: District created
- Succeeded by: Babe Woodyard

Member of the Illinois House of Representatives from the 53rd district
- In office 1977–1983
- Preceded by: James S. Emery, Jr.
- Succeeded by: District abolished

Personal details
- Born: January 8, 1949 Charleston, Illinois
- Died: January 14, 2016 (aged 67) Springfield, Illinois
- Party: Democratic
- Children: One son
- Education: Eastern Illinois University
- Profession: Lobbyist

Larry Ray Stuffle was an American politician and lobbyist who served as a Democratic member of the Illinois House of Representatives from the east-central area of the state from 1977 to 1985.

== Biography ==
Stuffle was born January 8, 1949 Charleston, Illinois. Stuffle attended Eastern Illinois University where he was student body president. He earned his Bachelor of Science and Master of Arts degrees from Eastern Illinois University. After college, he worked for the Illinois Senate Democratic Caucus.

Stuffle was elected to the Illinois House of Representatives in the 1976 general election. He succeeded James S. Emery Jr. who was appointed to replace Robert Craig after the latter was sentenced in the cement bribery case on October 29, 1976. After the Cutback Amendment ended cumulative voting and multi-member districts, Stuffle was elected from the 105th district. He defeated another incumbent legislator; Republican Steven Miller of Catlin. The district included portions of Coles and Vermillion. Notable legislation supported by Stuffle during his tenure included an effort to limit assessment increases on farmland. Stuffle supported the passage of the Equal Rights Amendment. In 1983, Mike Madigan appointed Stuffle to serve as the Chairman of the Select Committee on Economic Recovery. Stuffle was defeated by Babe Woodyard in the 1984 general election. Stuffle ran for the Illinois House of Representatives in the 1986 general election against William Black who was appointed to the Illinois House to succeed Babe Woodyard after the latter's appointment to the Illinois Senate.

Stuffle later became a lobbyist and Springfield, Illinois resident. He died January 14, 2016.
