= Illinois House of Representatives Progressive Caucus =

Progressive Caucus of the Illinois House of Representatives
- Co-Chairs: Will Guzzardi; Theresa Mah; Carol Ammons
- Secretary: Delia Ramirez
- Founded: 2019; 7 years ago
- Ideology: Progressivism
- Seats in Illinois House of Representatives: 21 / 118

The Progressive Caucus of the Illinois House of Representatives is a bloc of state legislators in the lower house of the Illinois General Assembly that was formed in 2019.

== History ==
Discussion about creating a progressive caucus first began in the Illinois House in early 2018, between representatives Will Guzzardi, Carol Ammons, and Theresa Mah. After the 2018 Illinois House of Representatives election, the three representatives pushed forward with their proposal. The caucus was formed and formally announced in February 2019, with 16 members. Their initially stated legislative priorities were a minimum wage increase, marijuana legalization, and campaign finance reform.

== Membership ==
=== Current members ===
Representative	Party	District	Joined
Aaron Ortiz	Democratic	1st	2019
Kimberly du Buclet	Democratic	5th	2019
Yolonda Morris	Democratic	9th	2025
Ann Williams	Democratic	11th	2021
Hoan Huynh	Democratic	13th	2023
Kelly Cassidy	Democratic	14th	2019
Kevin Olickal	Democratic	16th	2023
Jennifer Gong-Gershowitz	Democratic	17th	2019
Robyn Gabel	Democratic	18th	2019
Lindsey LaPointe	Democratic	19th	2021
Abdelnasser Rashid	Democratic	21st	2023
Edgar Gonzalez	Democratic	23rd	2021
Theresa Mah	Democratic	24th	2019
Will Guzzardi	Democratic	39th	2019
Anna Moeller	Democratic	43rd	2021
Mary Beth Canty	Democratic	54th	2023
Joyce Mason	Democratic	61st	2019
Laura Faver Dias	Democratic	62nd	2019
Maurice West	Democratic	67th	2019
Anne Stava-Murray	Democratic	81st	2019
Dagmara Avelar	Democratic	85th	2021
Carol Ammons	Democratic	103rd	2019

=== Former members ===
Representative	Party	District	Joined	Departed
Sara Feigenholtz	Democratic	12th	2019	2020; appointed to Illinois Senate
Greg Harris	Democratic	13th	2019	2023; retired
Robert Martwick	Democratic	19th	2019	2019; appointed to Illinois Senate
Lakesia Collins	Democratic	9th	2021	2025; elected to the Illinois Senate
Delia Ramirez	Democratic	4th	2019	2023; elected to the U.S. House of Representatives.
Lamont Robinson	Democratic	5th	2019	2023; elected to the Chicago City Council
Celina Villanueva	Democratic	21st	2019	2020; appointed to Illinois Senate

== See also ==
- Illinois Legislative Black Caucus
- Chicago City Council Progressive Reform Caucus
