= William B. Black (Illinois politician) =

American politician (1941–2023)

Member of the Illinois House of Representatives from the 104th district
- In office 1986 – December 22, 2010
- Preceded by: Babe Woodyard
- Succeeded by: Chad Hays

Personal details
- Born: November 11, 1941 Danville, Illinois, U.S.
- Died: September 9, 2023 (aged 81)
- Party: Republican
- Spouse: Sharon
- Education: William Jewell College (B.A.); University of Illinois (M.A.)
- Profession: College Administrator

William B. Black (November 11, 1941 – September 9, 2023) was an American politician who was a Republican member of the Illinois House of Representatives, representing the 104th district from 1986 until 2011. He was the Deputy Republican Leader.

== Early life and career ==
Black earned a Bachelor of Arts from William Jewell College and a Master of Arts in education from UIUC College of Education. He went on to become an administrator at Danville Community College. Black was a member of the Vermilion County Board and served as its chair prior to being appointed to the Illinois House of Representatives.

== Illinois House of Representatives ==
Black was appointed to the Illinois House of Representatives in 1986 after Representative Babe Woodyard was appointed to the Illinois Senate. He then defeated former State Representative Larry Stuffle in the 1986 general election.

During the 2008 Republican Party presidential primaries, Black served on the Illinois leadership team of the presidential campaign of former New York City Mayor Rudy Giuliani.

In 2007, Black had announced his plans to retire at the end of that term, but he entered the race for re-election after the Republican nominee, Scott Eisenhouer, withdrew his candidacy. In November 2008, Black was re-elected to office, defeating Democrat Lori DeYoung of Fithian, Illinois. Black resigned from the Illinois House effective December 22, 2010. The Republican county party chairs of the district appointed Chad Hays to succeed him. Hays was sworn into office on December 22, 2010.

== Post-legislative career ==
In 2013, Senate Minority Leader Christine Radogno appointed Black to the Procurement Policy Board for a four-year term. Black was appointed to the Board of Trustees of Danville Area Community College board in August 2014. Black was then elected in April 2015. He chose not to run for reelection in 2021.

== Death ==
William B. Black died on September 9, 2023, at the age of 81.
