= Saba Haider =

American politician

Member-elect of the Illinois House of Representatives from the 84th district
- Assuming office January 2027
- Succeeding: Stephanie Kifowit

Personal details
- Party: Democratic

Saba Haider is an American politician. She is the Democratic member-elect of the Illinois House of Representatives from the 84th district. Prior to her victory, she was a yoga instructor and member of the DuPage County Board.

== Biography ==
Haider was born to a family from Aurangabad, Bulandshahr; her father was a Uttar Pradesh Jal Nigam engineer and her mother a schoolteacher. and raised in Ghaziabad (where her father moved the family for work). She attended Holy Child School, Ghaziabad.

Haider did her bachelor studies at Ram Chameli Chadha Vishvas Girls' College and her master studies at Aligarh Muslim University, where she obtained an academic gold medal, before emigrating to the United States in the mid-2000s. She is a yoga instructor, and owns small business Ashoga Yoga LLC. She is also a member of the DuPage County Public Health Board.

Haider ran for a seat on the DuPage County Board in 2022, losing to Patty Gustin. She later ran a second time in 2024, this time being successful.

Haider ran in Illinois's 84th House of Representatives district in the 2026 election, after Democratic incumbent Stephanie Kifowit retired to unsuccessfully run in that year's Illinois Comptroller election. Her campaign priorities included affordability and better funding for public services. She won the Democratic primary in March 2026, defeating Jared Ploger 64% to 36%. She won the general election in November 2026, defeating Republican candidate Brian Scopa 71% to 29%. She is the first Indian-American woman elected to the Illinois General Assembly.

Haider lives in Aurora with her husband, computer science engineer Ali Kazmi, and two children.
