= Harry "Babe" Woodyard State Natural Area =

State park in Illinois, USA

- IUCN category V (protected landscape/seascape)
- Location within Illinois Location within the United States
- Location: Vermilion County, Illinois, USA
- Nearest city: Georgetown, Illinois
- Coordinates: 39°57′50″N 87°34′25″W
- Area: 1,104 acres (447 ha)
- Governing body: Illinois Department of Natural Resources

Harry "Babe" Woodyard State Natural Area is an Illinois state park on 1,104 acres (447 ha) in Vermilion County, Illinois, United States.

Part of this area used to be owned by Piankeshaw Council, Boy Scouts of America (BSA) a former part of Prairielands Council BSA, after those councils merged in 1992. It was known as Camp Cherokee Hills (the former summer camp of the Piankashaw Council BSA), located east of Georgetown, Illinois. This land was sold in 1996 to the State of Illinois to be an addition to the Harry "Babe" Woodyard State Natural Area.

The Natural Area is named in honor of a local farmer Harry Woodyard from Ridge Farm, Illinois who was elected to represent his constituents in the Illinois House and Illinois Senate in 1979–1996.
