= Randy Frese =

American politician

Member of the Illinois House of Representatives from the 94th district
- In office January 14, 2015 – January 8, 2025
- Preceded by: Jil Tracy
- Succeeded by: Kyle Moore

Adams County Circuit Clerk
- In office December 2004 – December 2012
- Preceded by: Glen F. Hultz
- Succeeded by: Lori Geschwandner

Personal details
- Party: Republican
- Spouse: Ronda
- Children: 3
- Education: Western Illinois University (BS)

Randy Frese is a former Republican member of the Illinois House of Representatives who represented the 94th district. The 94th district, located in Western Illinois along the Mississippi River, includes all or parts of Adams, Henderson, Hancock and Warren counties. He succeeded Jil Tracy, who chose not to run for re-election to be Kirk Dillard's running mate in the 2014 gubernatorial election. Prior to being elected to the Illinois House of Representatives, he served as the Adams County Circuit Clerk from 2004 until 2012 when he opted to run against John M. Sullivan for State Senate instead of running for re-election.

Frese served as an Illinois co-chair for the John Kasich's 2016 presidential campaign.

As of July 3, 2022, Representative Frese is a member of the following Illinois House committees:

- Appropriations - Human Services Committee (HAPH)
- Financial Impact Subcommittee (HMAC-IMPA)
- Health Care Licenses Committee (HHCL)
- Museums, Arts, & Cultural Enhancement Committee (HMAC)
- Veterans' Affairs Committee (HVET)
