= Harry Woodyard =

Harry Woodyard may refer to:

- Harry C. Woodyard (1867–1929), U.S. Representative from West Virginia
- Harry Woodyard (Illinois politician) (1930–1997), American politician, businessman, and farmer
