= Laurino (surname) =

Laurino is a surname. Notable people with the surname include:

- Margaret Laurino (born 1952), American politician
- Maria Laurino (born 1959), American journalist, essayist, memoirist, and former political speechwriter
- William Laurino (born 1941), American politician
