= Chad Hays =

American politician

Member of the Illinois House of Representatives from the 104th district
- In office December 2010 – September 2017
- Preceded by: William Black
- Succeeded by: Michael Marron

Mayor of Catlin
- In office May 1991 – May 1999
- Preceded by: Terry Dolan
- Succeeded by: Fred Rinehart

Personal details
- Born: January 5, 1963 (age 63) Vermilion County, Illinois
- Party: Republican
- Spouse: Ruth
- Children: Three Children
- Education: Southern Illinois University
- Profession: Hospital Administrator

Chad D. Hays is a Republican member of the Illinois House of Representatives, representing the 104th district from December 2010 to September 7, 2018.

William B. Black resigned from the Illinois House effective December 22, 2010. The Republican county party chairs of the district appointed Hays to succeed Black. Hays was sworn into office on December 22, 2010. For the 96th General Assembly, House Minority Leader Tom Cross appointed Hays to the following committees: Appropriations-Higher Education; Financial Institutions; Railroad Industry; and Transportation, Regulation, Roads.

On July 7, 2017, Hays announced his retirement from the Illinois House citing the budget impasse and on June 22, 2018, gave an effective date of resignation of September 7, 2018.

On February 12, 2016, Hays was named as an Illinois state co-chair of John Kasich's presidential campaign.
