= Brandun =

Brandun is a given name, a variant of Brandon.

Notable people with the name include:

- Brandun DeShay (born 1990), American rapper
- Brandun Lee (born 1999), American professional boxer
- Brandun Schweizer, American politician

== See also ==
- Brand Union
