= Mary Catherine Roberson =

American politician

Member-elect of the Illinois House of Representatives from the 104th district
- Assuming office January 2027
- Succeeding: Brandun Schweizer

Personal details
- Party: Democratic

Mary Catherine Roberson is an American politician. A member of the Democratic Party, she is the member-elect for the 104th district of the Illinois House of Representatives.
