= James Kirie =

American politician and businessman

Member of the Illinois House of Representatives

Personal details
- Party: Democratic

James C. Kirie (March 15, 1911 – June 19, 2000) was an American politician and businessman.

Kirie was born in River Grove, Illinois. He went to the local public schools. He served in the United States Army during World War II. Kirie went to the Central YMCA College and the John Marshall Law School. He owned Kirie's Restaurant. Kirie served as village clerk for River Grove, Illinois and as clerk for Leyden Township. Kirie was a Democrat. Kirie served in the Illinois House of Representatives from 1965 to 1970. He then lived in Elmwood Park, Illinois and served as commissioner for the Metropolitan Water Reclamation District of Greater Chicago from 1970 to 1988. Kirie died at Evanston Hospital in Evanston, Illinois.
