= Paul Jacobs (politician) =

American politician

Member of the Illinois Senate from the 59th district
- Incumbent
- Assumed office June 17, 2026
- Preceded by: Dale Fowler

Member of the Illinois House of Representatives from the 118th district
- In office January 11, 2023 – June 17, 2026
- Preceded by: Patrick Windhorst
- Succeeded by: Scott Doody

Personal details
- Born: Pomona, Illinois, U.S.
- Spouse: Rhoda
- Children: 4
- Website: https://reppauljacobs.com/

Military service
- Allegiance: United States
- Branch/service: United States Navy
- Years of service: 1965–1971

Paul Jacobs is a Republican member of the Illinois Senate from the 59th district. Jacobs took office June 17, 2026. He was appointed to fill the vacancy created by the resignation of Dale Fowler. Prior to his appointment to the Illinois Senate, he served in the Illinois House of Representatives from January 11, 2021 to June 17, 2026.

== Early life, education, and career ==
Jacobs was born in Pomona, Illinois. He served in the United States Navy from 1965 to 1971. He has been an optometrist for the Southern Illinois region since 1970. He and his wife Rhoda built and owned the Von Jakob Winery in Alto Pass, Illinois in 1997 and would later retire from the winery at an unknown date.

== Illinois House of Representatives career ==
Jacobs was originally elected, defeating two general election opponents with 77.7% of the total vote, to succeed then-state Representative Terri Bryant for the 115th district after she successfully ran for the Illinois Senate. He represented the 115th district during the 102nd General Assembly session, from January 11, 2021 until its adjournment on January 10, 2023. During the middle of his first term, new legislative district maps were approved by the General Assembly and signed into law on September 24, 2021, moving Jacobs' residence to the 118th district. The 118th district covers the southwest corner of the state, bordering the Mississippi River from Cairo, Illinois up to Grand Tower, Illinois, and spanning eastward to Marion, Illinois. Southern Illinois University's campus in Carbondale, Illinois, the largest city in the district, is a major educational institution in the region. Jacobs was elected to the 118th district in the 2022 general election with 61.3% of the vote and was re-elected, going unopposed, in November 2024. As of the 104th General Assembly, beginning in January 2025, Representative Jacobs was a member of the following Illinois House committees:

- Appropriations - Higher Education Committee (HAPI)
- Cybersecurity, Data Analytics, & IT (HCDA)
- Health Care Licenses Committee (HHCL)
- Prescription Drug Affordability (HPDA)
- Ethics & Elections (SHEE)
- Veterans' Affairs Committee (HVET)
- Museum, Arts, Culture, & Entertainment (HMAC) - Current Republican Spokesperson

Rep. Jacobs has sponsored several bills during his tenure in office, including, but not limited to:

- HB1333 of the 104th General Assembly, with a short title called the Repeal Reproductive Health Act. The bill was filed with the House Clerk on January 14, 2025 and as of February 6, 2025, it has been referred to the Rules Committee. The bill would create the Illinois Abortion Law of 2025 containing the provisions of the Illinois Abortion Law of 1975, create the Partial-birth Abortion Ban Act of 2025 and the Abortion Performance Refusal act of 2025, among other things.
- HB1336 of the 104th General Assembly, with a short title called the Parental Notice of Abortion Act of 2025. Co-sponsored with Rep. Tony McCombie, the bill has similar provisions to the 1995 Parental Notice of Abortion law. As of February 6, 2025, the bill has been referred to the Rules Committee. Included in the bill, under Section 40, titled "Penalties," under subsection A it reads, "Any physician who willfully fails to provide notice as required under this Act before performing an abortion on a minor or an incompetent person shall be referred to the Illinois State Medical Disciplinary Board for action in accordance with Section 22 of the Medical Practice Act of 1987."
- HB1340 of the 104th General Assembly, with a short title called the Ultrasound Opportunity Act. As of February 6, 2025, it has been referred to the Rules Committee. The bill, co-sponsored with Rep. Tony McCombie, would provide that "at any facility where abortions are performed, the physician who is to perform the abortion, the referring physician, or another qualified person...shall offer any woman seeking an abortion after 8 weeks of gestation an opportunity to receive and view an active ultrasound of her unborn child...prior to the woman having any part of an abortion performed..."

== Electoral history ==
Illinois 118th State House District General Election, 2024
Party	Candidate	Votes	%
Republican	Paul Jacobs	36,564	100.00

Illinois 115th State House District Republican Primary, 2020
Party	Candidate	Votes	%
Republican	Paul Jacobs	3,289	33.47
Republican	John R. Howard	2,826	28.76
Republican	Clifford Lindemann	1,573	16.01
Republican	Zachary A. Meyer	1,147	11.67
Republican	Johnnie Ray Smith II	992	10.09
Total votes		9,827	100.0

Illinois 115th State House District General Election, 2020
Party	Candidate	Votes	%
Republican	Paul Jacobs	34,331	77.67
Green	Randy Auxier	6,216	14.06
Libertarian	Ian Peak	3,655	8.27
Total votes		44,202	100.0

== Personal life ==
Jacobs currently resides in Pomona, Illinois and is married to his wife Rhoda. He has "four grown children and ten grandchildren." He is a lifelong Christian.
