= Terrel E. Clarke =

American politician (1920–1997)

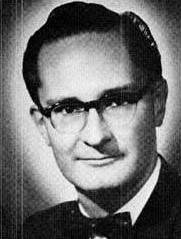

Member of the Illinois Senate
- In office 1967–1977

Personal details
- Born: Terrel Edward Clarke; March 20, 1920 Chicago, Illinois, U.S.
- Died: July 29, 1997 (aged 77)
- Party: Republican
- Education: University of Colorado; Harvard Business School

Military service
- Allegiance: United States
- Branch/service: United States Army
- Rank: Staff Sergeant

Terrel Edward "Tec" Clarke (March 20, 1920 – July 29, 1997) was an American politician, businessman, and politician.

== Background ==
Clarke was born in Chicago, Illinois. He went to the Lyons Township High School in the Lyons Township Cook County, Illinois. Clarke served in the United States Army during World War II and became a staff sergeant. He received his bachelor's degree from University of Colorado and his master's degree from Harvard Business School. He taught business briefly at the University of Kansas. Clarke lived in Western Springs, Illinois with his wife and family. He was an insurance broker. Clarke served in the Illinois House of Representatives from 1957 to 1967 and was a Republican. He then served in the Illinois Senate from 1967 to 1977. Clarke died from heart failure at his family's summer home in Castle Park, Michigan.
