= Edward Bluthardt =

American politician

- Born: December 16, 1916; Chicago, Illinois, U.S.
- Died: August 3, 1993 (aged 76); Chicago, Illinois, U.S.

Edward E. Bluthardt (December 16, 1916 – August 3, 1993) was an American politician and lawyer.

Born in Chicago, Illinois, Bluthardt went to the Chicago Public Schools. He served in the United States Army during World War II and was commissioned a lieutenant. Bluthardt received his bachelor's degree from Illinois College and his law degree from John Marshall Law School. Bluthardt practiced law and lived in Schiller Park, Illinois. He served as mayor of Schiller Park and was a Republican. Bluthardt served in the Illinois House of Representatives from 1967 to 1983. Bluthardt died at Resurrection Medical Center in Chicago, Illinois.
