= Erica Bray-Parker =

Illinois state representative

Member of the Illinois House of Representatives from the 47th district
- Member-elect
- Assumed office January 13, 2027
- Preceded by: Amy Grant

Personal details
- Party: Democratic
- Education: Illinois State University (BA in Social Science Education) Northern Illinois University (MS in Political Science)

Erica Bray-Parker is an American politician and educator who is the member-elect of the Illinois House of Representatives for the 47th district. The district, located in DuPage County, includes all or parts of Bartlett, Carol Stream, Glen Ellyn, Lisle, Naperville, Warrenville, Wayne, West Chicago, Wheaton, and Winfield. A member of the Democratic Party, she has served since 2019 as a Wheaton city councilwoman at-large.

Bray-Parker, of Wheaton, taught civics and social studies at Glenbard North High School in Carol Stream, Illinois, for 33 years before retiring in 2026. She earned a bachelor's degree in social science education from Illinois State University, and a master's degree in political science from Northern Illinois University. In the 2026 general election, she defeated Republican candidate Robert Vrankovich, flipping the seat from Republican to Democratic control. She is scheduled to take office on January 13, 2027.

== Electoral history ==
The following table details the results of the 2026 Democratic primary for the Illinois House of Representatives 47th district.

Illinois 47th State House District Democratic Primary, 2026
Party	Candidate	Votes	%
Democratic	Erica Bray-Parker	12,266	100.0
Total votes		12,266	100.0

The following table details the results of the 2026 general election for the Illinois House of Representatives 47th district.

Illinois 47th State House District General Election, 2026
Party	Candidate	Votes	%
Democratic	Erica Bray-Parker	27,014	59.39
Republican	Robert A. Vrankovich	18,474	40.61
Total votes		45,488	100.0
