= Edward Acevedo (politician) =

American politician (born 1963)

Member of the Illinois House of Representatives from the 2nd district
- In office 1997–2017
- Preceded by: Benjamin A. "Ben" Martinez
- Succeeded by: Theresa Mah

Personal details
- Born: July 23, 1963 (age 62) Chicago, Illinois, U.S.
- Party: Democratic

Edward "Eddie" Acevedo (born July 23, 1963) is an American politician. He was a Democratic member of the Illinois House of Representatives, representing the 2nd district from 1997 to 2017. In 2021 he was convicted of tax evasion.

== Early life ==
Acevedo was born and raised in Chicago. He earned his associate degree in general studies from City-Wide College.

=== Chicago Police Department ===
Acevedo long served as a police officer for the Chicago Police Department. He was decorated for heroism and valor by the Cook County Sheriff's Office for rescuing victims trapped in a fire. To which we learn was a lie and he never rescued anyone.

In June 1995, he would hired by the Chicago Police Department to serve as a correctional officer for the Cook County Sheriff’s Office.

In 2013, Acevedo stopped an unarmed 16-year-old boy after dark on Chicago's northwest side. Acevedo was enraged to learn that the boy was not carrying any identification, at one point yelling “How am I supposed to identify your dead body if I find you on the streets?”. The boy was frightened and fled down a nearby alley, to which Acevedo responded by firing at him 3 times with his service pistol. Acevedo hit the boy in the arm and leg, while missing his third shot. Though critically injured, the boy survived and recovered from the encounter. Two years after the shooting, the Independent Police Review Authority (IPRA) cleared Acevedo of any wrongdoing.

By December 2024, he was no longer a police officer.

== State representative ==
Acevedo was first elected State Representative in 1997. During his tenure, he was re-elected co-chair of the Illinois Legislative Latino Caucus for state legislators and co-chair of the Illinois Legislative Latino Caucus Foundation. He was the first Latino appointed to his position of assistant majority leader.

Acevedo served on nine committees: Appropriations for Elementary and Secondary Education; Broadband Infrastructure; Executive; Financial Institutions; International Trade and Commerce; Pay Day Loans; Pension Fund Management Procurement; Registration and Regulation; and Telecommunications.

== Election results ==
Office for Illinois House of Representatives for the 2nd District
Year	Winner	Votes	Pct	Opponent	Votes	Pct
1998 Democratic Primary	Edward Acevedo	3490	50.93%	Gilmo Gomez; Linda Johnson	2332; 1130	32.57% 16.49%
1998 General	Edward Acevedo	7019	100%	No Challenger		
2000 Democratic Primary	Edward Acevedo	4270	100%	No Challenger		
2000 General	Edward Acevedo	11444	100%	No Challenger		
2002 Democratic Primary	Edward Acevedo	8543	100%	No Challenger		
2002 General	Edward Acevedo (Democrat)	11037	83.18%	George Preski (Republican)	2232	16.82%
2004 Democratic Primary	Edward Acevedo	7901	100%	No Challenger		
2004 General	Edward Acevedo	14384	100%	No Challenger		
2006 Democratic Primary	Edward Acevedo	6062	73.19%	Francisco "Frankie" Rodriguez	2220	26.81%
2006 General	Edward Acevedo	12001	100%	No Challenger		
2008 Democratic Primary	Edward Acevedo	8172	71.01%	Francisco "Frankie" Rodriguez	3337	28.99%
2008 General	Edward Acevedo (Democrat)	16327	82.88%	Ante "Tony" Marijan (Green)	3372	17.12%
2010 Democratic Primary	Edward Acevedo	4278	57.80%	Robert Martinez; Josip "Joe" Trutin; Richard G. Schultz	1206; 1065; 853	16.29% 14.39% 11.52%
2012 Democratic Primary	Edward Acevedo	3458	54.72%	Cuahutémoc 'Temoc' Morfin; Josip "Joe" Trutin	1872; 979	29.62% 15.65%

== Voting history ==
=== Abortion ===
Acevedo voted for a bill that allows for minors to obtain abortions without family or judicial notification by seeking counseling with a licensed medical counseling professional.

He voted against a bill that allows stem cell research but prohibits human cloning.

=== Business and consumers ===
He voted for a bill that prohibits smoking in public places.

Acevedo sponsored and voted for House Bill HB429 which as of June 1, 2008, removed the right of Illinois wine buyers to buy wine from out-of-state wine stores.

=== Electronic eavesdropping ===
Acevedo voted against HB 3944 which would have amended the electronic eavesdropping act to permit citizens to make recordings of a police officer "who is performing a public duty in a public place and any other person who is having a conversation with that law enforcement officer if the conversation is at a volume audible to the unassisted ear of the person who is making the recording."

=== Eminent domain ===
He voted against a bill that prohibits the use of eminent domain to acquire property for private ownership or control unless the acquisition is primarily for the benefit, use, or enjoyment of the public and is necessary for a public purpose. The bill states that unless proven otherwise, the use of eminent domain for private ownership or control of blighted areas, as defined, or by private utilities and railroads for any purpose meets these tests. The bill also requires the payment of reasonable relocation costs to individuals displaced by an eminent domain action. The bill also makes numerous other adjustments to eminent domain laws.

=== Energy ===
He sponsored House Bill 2971, which would remove language in Illinois law which says that new nuclear plants can not be built until a solution for storing tons of radioactive waste is found. Lifting the 20-year-old moratorium on the construction of new nuclear facilities in Illinois.

He voted for a bill that requires Illinois electric suppliers to grant consumers an electricity relief package. Grants ComEd and Ameren customers $976 in relief from 2007 to 2010 (Sec. 16-111.5A).

=== Firearms ===
He voted no on several firearm bills that would let law-abiding citizens protect themselves with a firearm. e.g. HB-148-The Family and Personal Protection Act (Which has been endorsed by the Chicago Police Lieutenants Association)& HR0550-Firearm Public Awareness, but Mr. Acevedo carries a firearm to protect himself and his family. Voted 'yes' to several safety bills to crack down on individuals who sell firearms without a license.

=== Healthcare ===
He did not vote on HB 5285 a bill that would allow for the extending parental health insurance to unmarried dependents.

=== Immigration ===
He voted for a bill that allows the Secretary of State to issue driver's certificates to an applicant who is an immigrant residing in this State, is ineligible to obtain a social security number, and is ineligible to receive a driver's license.

=== Property taxes ===
He did not vote on HB 4201 which would create a property tax exemption for disabled veterans.

=== Transportation ===
Acevedo voted to concur with the Governor's amendment which proposed that any fixed route public transportation services provided by the Chicago Transit Authority, the Commuter Rail Board, the Suburban Bus Board, all Local Mass Districts, and certain participants in the Downstate Public Transportation Fund shall be provided without charge to senior citizens aged 65 and older, subject to certain residency requirements and under conditions determined by the transit board.

He voted yes to fund the Regional Transportation Authority through the motor fuel tax. This bill redirects 80 percent of the revenue collected from the 6.25 percent tax on motor fuel in the six Regional Transportation Authority (RTA) counties (Cook, DuPage, Kane, Lake, McHenry, and Will) to the Public Transportation Fund [sec. 4.09 (a)(2)].

He also voted yes to pass a bill that amends the Regional Transportation Authority Act by increasing the rate of taxes the Authority is allowed to impose and requiring the Authority to provide oversight of the Service Boards. This bill also designates funds for the support and improvement of public transportation. - Allows the City of Chicago to impose a real estate transfer tax of up to $1.50 per $500 of value [Sec. 3–2.3(E)]. - Allows for a 0.25% increase in the sales tax in the Chicago metropolitan area [Sec. 4.03(e-g)]. - Outlines the distribution of tax revenues to various Service Boards (Sec. 4.03.3).

=== Veteran Affairs ===
He did not vote on HB 4201 which would create a property tax exemption for disabled veterans.

== Tax evasion case ==
On December 14, 2021, Acevedo pled guilty to dodging $37,000 in taxes over a period of three years. On March 23, 2022, Acevedo received a six month prison sentence. At the time of his sentencing, it also acknowledged that this tax evasion case against Acevodo was also tied to the same investigation which led to the then-recent indictment of renowned former Illinois Speaker of the House Michael Madigan.

== Health problems ==
In December 2024, Acevedo was confirmed to now suffer from seizures due to epilepsy, high blood pressure and congestive heart failure. A photo of him walking into the Dirksen Federal Courthouse while testifying as a defense witness in trial of Michael Madigan also showed that Acevedo used a walker during this time.
