= Kyle Moore (politician) =

American politician

Member of the Illinois House of Representatives from the 99th district
- Incumbent
- Assumed office January 8, 2025
- Preceded by: Randy Frese

Personal details
- Party: Republican
- Education: Quincy University
- Website: www.moore4illinois.com

Kyle Moore is an American politician. He serves as a Republican member of the Illinois House of Representatives for District 99 since 2025. He was previously mayor of Quincy, Illinois. He is seeking a second term in the 2026 Illinois House of Representatives election.
