= Richard A. Walsh =

American lawyer and politician

Member of the Illinois House of Representatives

Personal details
- Party: Republican

Richard A. Walsh (November 25, 1930 – January 25, 2005) was an American lawyer and politician.

Born in Chicago, Illinois, Walsh served in the United States Navy from 1954 to 1957. He received his bachelor's degree from Loyola University Chicago and his law degree from Loyola University Chicago School of Law. He practiced law in Illinois and Wisconsin. He served in the Illinois House of Representatives from 1963 until 1977 and then in the Illinois State Senate from 1977 until 1983 and was a Republican. His uncle Arthur J. Bidwill and his brother William D. Walsh also served in the Illinois General Assembly. Walsh died in River Forest, Illinois.
