= Catlin, Illinois =

Catlin
- Village
- Nickname: the V-O-C
- Location of Catlin in Vermilion County, Illinois.

- Catlin's location in Vermilion County
- Coordinates: 40°04′03″N 87°42′28″W
- Country: United States
- State: Illinois
- County: Vermilion County
- Township: Catlin Township
- Founded: 1866

Area
  - Total: 0.85 sq mi (2.21 km^{2})
  - Land: 0.85 sq mi (2.20 km^{2})
  - Water: 0.0039 sq mi (0.01 km^{2})
- Elevation: 656 ft (200 m)

Population (2020)
  - Total: 1,983
  - Density: 2,335/sq mi (901.4/km^{2})
- Time zone: UTC-6 (CST)
  - Summer (DST): UTC-5 (CDT)
- ZIP code: 61817
- Area code: 217
- FIPS code: 17-11774
- GNIS ID: 2397576
- Website: catlinil.com

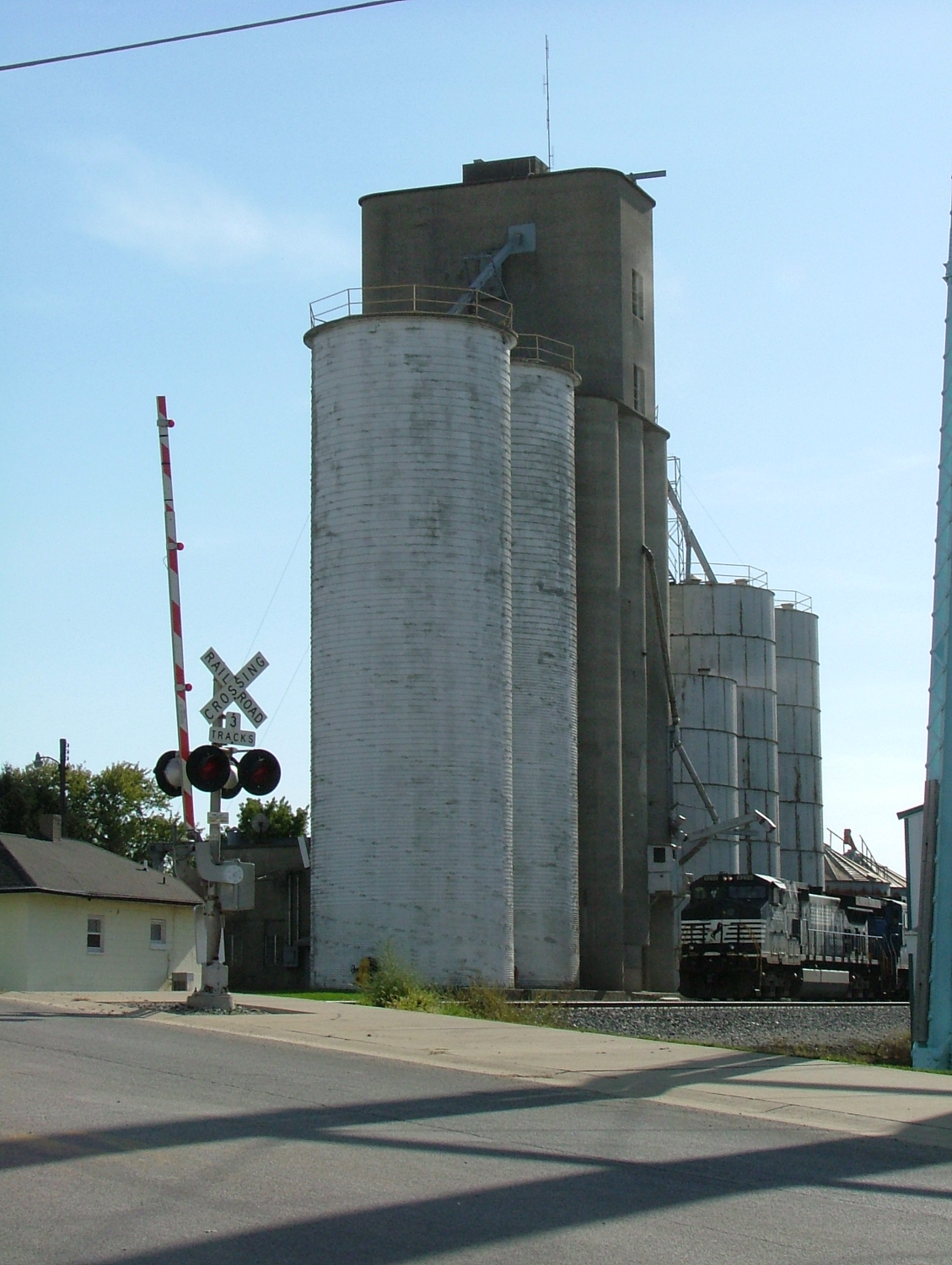
Grain elevator in Catlin

Catlin is a village in Vermilion County, Illinois, United States. It is part of the Danville, Illinois Metropolitan Statistical Area. As of the 2020 census, Catlin had a population of 1,983. Catlin is the hometown of Illinois State Representative Chad Hays, who represented the 104th Representative District of Illinois.

== History ==
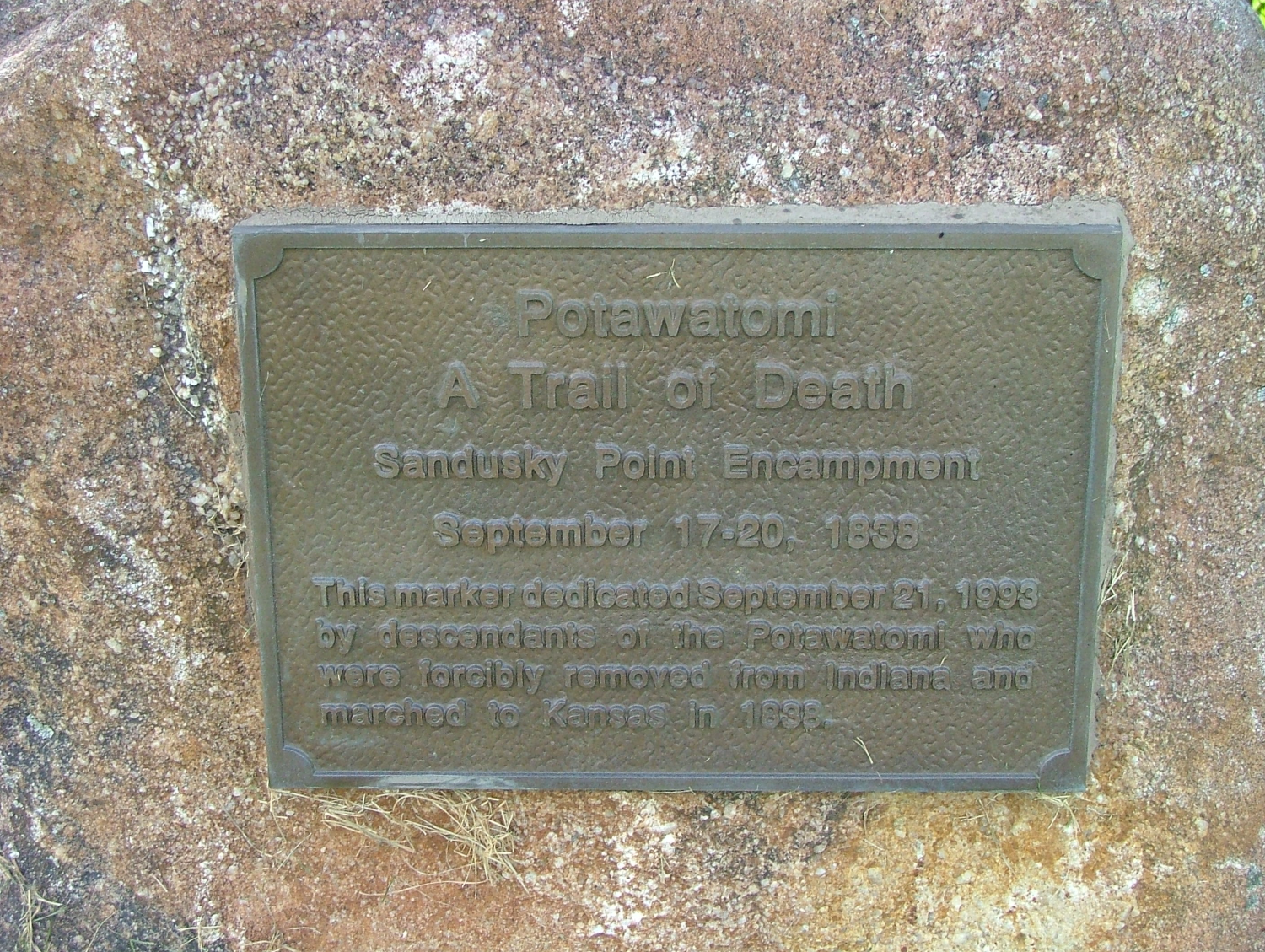
Potawatomi Trail of Death marker

Early significant events in our village history.

1820—First permanent settlement of Vermilion County. James Butler first settler. His place was called Butler's Point.

1822—God's Acre Cemetery, the first cemetery in Vermilion County was established. First meeting of county commissioners held at Butler's home. First Circuit Court held at home of Asa Elliott, friend of James Butler.

1823—First mill built and used in Vermilion and Champaign Counties, called a "corncracker" by James Butler. Made of a large log and stones, all constructed on a hand-made forge. Its capacity, with a muscular man as motive power, was one bushel of cracked corn in an hour.

1824—The "salt works" drew in the first settlers of the area. Twenty-four large salt kettles were brought in and each held 100 gallons. It took 100 gallons of water to make a bushel of salt.

1825—First marriage in the county was a double marriage. Couples were from Butler's Point. Cyrus Douglas wed Ruby Bloss and Annis Butler wed Marquis Snow.

1827—Amos Woodin, a cooper by trade, built the house now known as the Catlin Heritage Museum. First school was built and doubled as a church.

1830—Grandma Guyman arrived in the area and became the Doctor and Midwife to Catlin Township, delivering over 1,000 babies. G. W. Pate and his father Adam Pate come to Butler's Point. Identified with progress of Methodism in this part of the country.

1834—Asa Elliott, friend of James Butler and one of the original settlers of Butler's Point, begins serving in the State Legislature with Abe Lincoln.

1838—The Potawatomi Trail of Death came through the village. 860 members of this Indian tribe were forcibly removed by militia from north central Indiana to reservation land in what is now eastern Kansas.

1849—Henry Jones of England came to the area and bought the Whitcomb farm and 3,000 acres adjacent. He had 14 head of oxen and considerable cattle and was considered wealthy.

1850—Second Fair of Vermilion County Agricultural and Mechanical Association were held at the Fairgrounds in Catlin until 1878 when it was transferred to Danville.

1850 - The first school was constructed in Catlin.

1856—Guy Merrill and Josiah Hunt made first plat of Catlin. The village is officially named Catlin, after the president of the Great Western Railroad.

1880 - A two year high school was created in 1880. The school mascot for the high school was the "Wolverines".

1895 - Catlin High School became a four year course of study in 1907.

1906 - Catlin's first newspaper was started and lasted until 1908 called the Catlin Herald.

1920 - A new and separate building for the high school students was constructed. Where the current high school stands today.

1936 - Catlin started another newspaper called the Catlin Courier. It lasted until 1969.

== Geography ==
According to the 2010 census, Catlin has a total area of 0.843 square miles (2.18 km^{2}), of which 0.84 square miles (2.18 km^{2}) (or 99.64%) is land and 0.003 square miles (0.01 km^{2}) (or 0.36%) is water.

== Education ==
It is in the Salt Fork Community Unit School District 512.

The former Catlin Community Unit School District #5 consisted of Catlin Grade School with about 375-400 students and Catlin High School with about 145–175.3 students.

The former Catlin Community Unit School District #5 and the former Jamaica Unit #12 have consolidated athletics for their high schools since 1995.

In November 2014, Catlin residents approved a referendum to consolidate with the Jamaica Unit #12 school district. The first day of school in the newly formed Salt Fork Unit #512 school district was August 24, 2015.

Currently, Salt Fork North is an elementary school in Catlin, serving students in grades PK through 5th. It is one of two elementary schools in the Salt Fork School District #512. The school serves approximately 260 students residing in Catlin and the surrounding area.

Additionally, Salt Fork High School is also located in Catlin, serving students in grades 9-12 from IL School District 512.

== Government and politics ==
Catlin's government consists of a mayor and a village board. The village utilizes a commissioner form of government. The mayor is elected separately from the other members of the board and serves a four-year term. Each candidate for the board runs in an at-large election for a four-year term. After a candidate is elected generally to the board, the mayor appoints each board member a specific commissioner position (e.g. Finance, Streets and Sanitation). There are no term limits on any of the elected officials.

== Religion ==
There are two churches in the village: the Catlin Church of Christ and the Catlin United Methodist Church. Each of the churches is Christian and Protestant. Despite the large number of Protestants in the village, many of Catlin's residents are Roman Catholic and attend services in nearby Danville, Illinois and Westville, Illinois. In addition, a Presbyterian church once existed on what is currently the property of the United Methodist Church. In 1942 this church disbanded, and exchanged properties with the Church of Christ, which later sold its building to the Methodist Church when the Church of Christ built its current structure in 1956.

== Demographics ==
Historical population
Census	Pop.	Note	%±
1880	317		—
1890	275		−13.2%
1900	697		153.5%
1910	952		36.6%
1920	931		−2.2%
1930	813		−12.7%
1940	845		3.9%
1950	953		12.8%
1960	1,263		32.5%
1970	2,093		65.7%
1980	2,226		6.4%
1990	2,173		−2.4%
2000	2,087		−4.0%
2010	2,040		−2.3%
2020	1,983		−2.8%
U.S. Decennial Census

=== 2020 census ===
As of the 2020 census, Catlin had a population of 1,983. The median age was 38.6 years. 26.1% of residents were under the age of 18 and 19.7% of residents were 65 years of age or older. For every 100 females there were 94.8 males, and for every 100 females age 18 and over there were 83.1 males age 18 and over.

0.0% of residents lived in urban areas, while 100.0% lived in rural areas.

There were 848 households in Catlin, of which 31.1% had children under the age of 18 living in them. Of all households, 47.8% were married-couple households, 13.9% were households with a male householder and no spouse or partner present, and 32.1% were households with a female householder and no spouse or partner present. About 31.1% of all households were made up of individuals and 16.1% had someone living alone who was 65 years of age or older.

There were 897 housing units, of which 5.5% were vacant. The homeowner vacancy rate was 1.4% and the rental vacancy rate was 3.1%.

Racial composition as of the 2020 census
Race	Number	Percent
White	1,887	95.2%
Black or African American	8	0.4%
American Indian and Alaska Native	4	0.2%
Asian	3	0.2%
Native Hawaiian and Other Pacific Islander	0	0.0%
Some other race	9	0.5%
Two or more races	72	3.6%
Hispanic or Latino (of any race)	36	1.8%

=== 2000 census ===
As of the census of 2000, there were 2,087 people, 824 households, and 618 families residing in the village. The population density was 2,657.1 inhabitants per square mile (1,025.9/km^{2}). There were 854 housing units at an average density of 1,087.3 units per square mile (419.8 units/km^{2}). The racial makeup of the village was 99.09% White, 0.05% African American, 0.19% Native American, 0.05% Asian, 0.24% from other races, and 0.38% from two or more races. Hispanic or Latino of any race were 0.48% of the population.

There were 824 households, out of which 35.0% had children under the age of 18 living with them, 62.7% were married couples living together, 9.2% had a female householder with no husband present, and 24.9% were non-families. 22.1% of all households were made up of individuals, and 10.2% had someone living alone who was 65 years of age or older. The average household size was 2.53 and the average family size was 2.93.

In the village, the population was spread out, with 26.4% under the age of 18, 7.5% from 18 to 24, 28.4% from 25 to 44, 24.0% from 45 to 64, and 13.8% who were 65 years of age or older. The median age was 38 years. For every 100 females, there were 89.2 males. For every 100 females age 18 and over, there were 84.8 males.

The median income for a household in the village was $46,210, and the median income for a family was $51,136. Males had a median income of $40,755 versus $25,823 for females. The per capita income for the village was $19,164. About 2.4% of families and 4.0% of the population were below the poverty line, including 2.7% of those under age 18 and 3.4% of those age 65 or over.

== Notable residents ==
- Ralph E. Church, member of the Illinois and of the United States House of Representatives
- Chad Hays, member of the Illinois House of Representatives and a former Mayor of Catlin.
- Tyler Jacob Moore, actor
