= Michael Marron =

American politician

Mike Marron

Member of the Illinois House of Representatives from the 104th district
- In office September 7, 2018 – December 18, 2023
- Preceded by: Chad Hays
- Succeeded by: Brandun Schweizer

Personal details
- Party: Republican
- Children: 2
- Profession: Farmer

Michael T. Marron was a Republican member of the Illinois House of Representatives from the 104th district. The 104th district includes parts of Champaign and Vermilion counties in east-central Illinois. Marron was sworn into office September 7, 2018 after his July 22, 2018 appointment to succeed Chad Hays. Marron, who was the Republican candidate to succeed Hays at the time of his appointment, won the 2018 general election against Democratic candidate Cynthia Cunningham.

Marron's committee assignments are the Committee on Community College Access & Affordability; the Committee on the Environment; and the Committee on Insurance Subcommittee on Property & Casualty.

On September 3, 2019, Marron announced he would explore a run for Illinois's 15th congressional district to succeed retiring Congressman John Shimkus, but shortly after opted to run for reelection to the Illinois House of Representatives.

As of July 3, 2022, Representative Marron is a member of the following Illinois House committees:

- Energy & Environment Committee (HENG)
- Firefighters and First Responders Subcommittee (SHPF-FIRE)
- Higher Education Committee (HHED)
- Housing Committee (SHOU)
- Law Enforcement Subcommittee (SHPF-LAWE)
- Police & Fire Committee (SHPF)
- Roadways, Rail & Aviation Subcommittee (HTRR-ROAD)
- Transportation: Regulation, Roads & Bridges Committee (HTRR)

Marron resigned from the Illinois House in December 2023 to begin work at an economic development organization in Vermilion County.

== Electoral history ==
Illinois 104th State House District Republican Primary, 2018
Party	Candidate	Votes	%
Republican	Mike Marron	7,097	100.0
Total votes		7,097	100.0

Illinois 104th State House District General Election, 2018
Party	Candidate	Votes	%
Republican	Mike Marron (incumbent)	20,348	55.92
Democratic	Cynthia E. Cunningham	16,041	44.08
Total votes		36,389	100.0
