= Big Bay, Illinois =

- Unincorporated community
- Location within Illinois Location within the United States
- Coordinates: 37°19′00″N 88°43′18″W
- Country: United States
- State: Illinois
- County: Massac
- Elevation: 348 ft (106 m)
- Time zone: UTC-6 (Central (CST))
  - Summer (DST): UTC-5 (CDT)
- Area code: 618
- GNIS feature ID: 404375

Big Bay is an unincorporated community in Massac County, Illinois, United States. Big Bay is 11.5 miles (18.5 km) north of Metropolis.

Big Bay is located in a farming community, and its residents were said to raise nearly all their own food well into the 20th century. Big Bay was a significant timber shipping point on the Illinois Central Railroad, but damage from the 1937 flood caused the town to decline. By 1979 it consisted of "barely a dozen houses." Residents successfully pushed for the town to have an exit on Interstate 24 when that highway was built in the 1970s. Big Bay reportedly had a post office briefly in 1835.
