= Scott Doody =

American politician

Member of the Illinois House of Representatives from the 118th district
- Incumbent
- Assumed office June 25, 2026
- Preceded by: Paul Jacobs

Personal details
- Party: Republican Party

Scott Doody is an American politician serving as a member of the Illinois House of Representatives for the 118th district since being appointed on June 25, 2026, to succeed Paul Jacobs. He had won the Republican primary for the district in the March 17 primary.

Doody resides in Anna, Illinois, and is a life-long resident of Union County, Illinois. He runs a business restoring classic cars and previously had a career in local media production and private security.
