= Bay City, Pope County, Illinois =

Bay City, Illinois
- Unincorporated community
- Location within Illinois Location within the United States
- Coordinates: 37°14′56″N 88°29′48″W
- Country: United States
- State: Illinois
- County: Pope
- Elevation: 341 ft (104 m)
- Time zone: UTC-6 (Central (CST))
  - Summer (DST): UTC-5 (CDT)
- Area code: 618
- GNIS feature ID: 424606

Bay City is an unincorporated community in Pope County, Illinois, United States. Bay City is located on the Ohio River 8 miles (13 km) south of Golconda.

A general store, built in 1915, overlooks the river. The store is restored, and open weekends. Bed and breakfast rooms are upstairs. Riverboats of past decades were dependable local transportation, and would stop for passengers or freight if hailed from the shore.

Bay City is 9 miles (14 km) north of the Smithland Lock and Dam.
