= William Laurino =

American politician

William J. Laurino (April 27, 1941 – August 12, 2023) was an American politician.

Born in Chicago, Illinois, Laurino served in the United States Army. He went to Wilbur Wright College and Loyola University Chicago. Laurino served in the Illinois Sixth Constitutional Convention of 1970 and was a Democrat. Laurino served in the Illinois House of Representatives from 1971 to 1997.
