= Brandun Schweizer =

American politician in Illinois

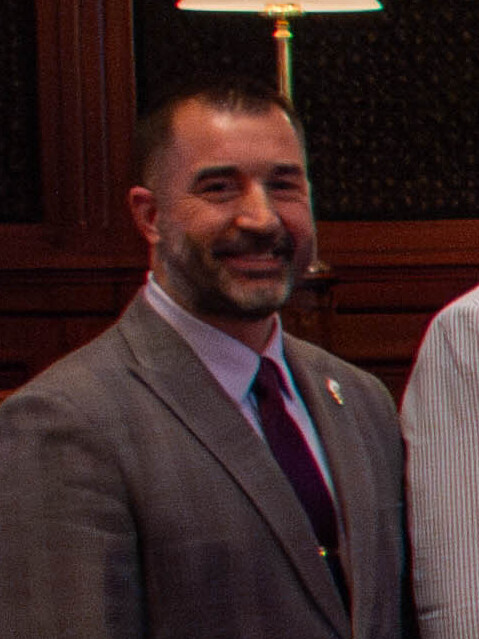
- Schweizer in 2025

Member of the Illinois House of Representatives from the 104th district
- Incumbent
- Assumed office December 21, 2023
- Preceded by: Michael Marron
- Succeeded by: Mary Catherine Roberson (elect)

Personal details
- Party: Republican

Brandun Schweizer is an American politician who serves as a member of the Illinois House of Representatives for the 104th district. He represents parts of Vermilion and Champaign counties in east-central Illinois. Schweizer was appointed to the 104th District to fill the vacancy of retiring Mike Marron. Before serving as the 104th district Representative, Schweizer served in the United States Marine Corps for 21 years. During his time in the USMC, he served as a Recruiter, Intelligence Analyst, and Equal Opportunity Advisor, retiring in January 2023. Following his retirement from the USMC, Schweizer began working for the City of Danville as a Code Enforcement Officer until his appointment in December 2023. Schweizer is the brother-in-law of current Danville mayor Rickey Williams, Jr.

Under Schweizer, Danville made national headlines with a Wall Street Journal article criticizing Danville and other municipalities nationwide for misappropriating COVID-19 funds. Out of the $26 million received from the federal government, Danville spent approximately half on a new water park.
