= Will Guzzardi =

American politician

- Guzzardi at 2026 nurses' strike at St. Mary of the Nazarene Hospital

Member of the Illinois House of Representatives from the 39th district
- Incumbent
- Assumed office January 14, 2015
- Preceded by: Maria Antonia Berrios

Personal details
- Born: New York City, U.S.
- Party: Democratic
- Education: Brown University (BA)

Will Guzzardi is a Democratic member of the Illinois House of Representatives who represents the 39th District. The 39th District includes parts of the Avondale, Belmont Cragin, Hermosa, Old Irving Park, Portage Park and Logan Square. Guzzardi is a co-chair of the Illinois House's Progressive Caucus.

== Early life, education, and career ==
Guzzardi was born in New York City. He grew up in Chapel Hill, North Carolina, before attending Brown University for college, where he graduated with a comparative literature degree.

He moved to Chicago in 2009 and worked as an associate editor for the Chicago branch of the Huffington Post. He later worked as the head writer for the University of Chicago Office of College Admissions.

== Campaigns ==
In 2012, Guzzardi ran for the Illinois House of Representatives, but lost by 125 votes to the incumbent Maria Antonia Berrios, daughter of then Cook Country Democratic Party Chairman, Joseph Berrios. Berrios had the support of the Chicago Democratic establishment behind her, including endorsements from Cook County Board President Toni Preckwinkle as well as Illinois House Speaker Mike Madigan.

In 2014, Guzzardi again ran for the seat in one of the most-followed races in the city that year with the support of progressive groups like the Chicago Teachers Union and other progressive elected officials. Ultimately, Guzzardi defeated Berrios by a 20% margin.

Guzzardi's campaigns have focused on issues of social and economic inequality, and opposition to Chicago's machine politics.

== Illinois General Assembly ==
As of July 3, 2022, Representative Guzzardi was a member of the following Illinois House committees:

- Criminal Administration and Enforcement Subcommittee (HJUC-CAES)
- Cybersecurity, Data Analytics, & IT Committee (HCDA)
- Firearms and Firearm Safety Subcommittee (HJUC-FIRE)
- (Chairman of) Housing Committee (SHOU)
- Judiciary - Criminal Committee (HJUC)
- Juvenile Justice and System-Involved Youth Subcommittee (HJUC-JJSI)
- (Chairman of) Prescription Drug Affordability (HPDA)
- Sentencing, Penalties and Criminal Procedure Subcommittee (HJUC-SPCP)
- Sex Offenses and Sex Offender Registration Subcommittee

=== Tenure ===
As State Representative, Guzzardi has focused on issues pertaining to labor rights, progressive causes, and assistance for working families. Some of his enacted bills include:

- SB1 - Raises the minimum wage to $15 an hour in Illinois
- SB667 - A measure that caps the cost of insulin co-payments for insurance plans for 260,000 Illinoisans at $100 per month
- SB1351 - A student loan bill of rights to protect individuals with student loan debt from predatory lending practices
- HB303 - A law that reforms civic asset forfeitures practices by Illinois law enforcement to ensure Illinoisan's property is not taken unjustly
- SB2746 - A law that eliminates the “tampon tax” on feminine hygiene products. Previously, these products were subjected to being taxed as luxuries instead of medical essentials.
- SB3762 - A law that eliminates the Death Penalty for Sentencing Treason in Illinois. Effective 1/1/2024.

In 2018, J. B. Pritzker appointed Guzzardi a member of the gubernatorial transition's Job Creation and Economic Opportunity Committee.

== Electoral history ==
Illinois 39th State House District Democratic Primary, 2012
Party	Candidate	Votes	%
Democratic	Maria Antonia "Toni" Berrios	4,021	50.79
Democratic	Will Guzzardi	3,896	49.21
Total votes		7,917	100.0

Illinois 39th State House District Democratic Primary, 2014
Party	Candidate	Votes	%
Democratic	Will Guzzardi	5,316	60.41
Democratic	Maria Antonia "Toni" Berrios (incumbent)	3,484	39.59
Total votes		8,800	100.0

Illinois 39th State House District General Election, 2014
Party	Candidate	Votes	%
Democratic	Will Guzzardi	14,644	100.0
Total votes		14,644	100.0

Illinois 39th State House District General Election, 2016
Party	Candidate	Votes	%
Democratic	Will Guzzardi (incumbent)	29,170	100.0
Total votes		29,170	100.0

Illinois 39th State House District General Election, 2018
Party	Candidate	Votes	%
Democratic	Will Guzzardi (incumbent)	26,106	100.0
Total votes		26,106	100.0

Illinois 39th State House District General Election, 2020
Party	Candidate	Votes	%
Democratic	Will Guzzardi (incumbent)	33,816	100.0
Total votes		33,816	100.0

Illinois 39th Representative District General Election, 2022
Party	Candidate	Votes	%
Democratic	Will Guzzardi (incumbent)	21,918	85.75
Republican	Anthony Curran	3642	14.25
Total votes		25,560	100.0
