= Harry Woodyard (Illinois politician) =

American politician, businessman, and farmer

Harry "Babe" Woodyard (December 3, 1930 – January 31, 1997) was an American politician, businessman, and farmer.

== Biography ==
Born in Danville, Illinois, Woodyard graduated from Ridge Farm High School, in Ridge Farm, Illinois, and then served in the United States Army from 1954 to 1956. He then went to Illinois Wesleyan University. He was a farmer and businessman. After Jim Edgar resigned his seat in the Illinois House of Representatives, Republican county chairmen of the 53rd District appointed Woodyard to the vacancy. From 1979 until 1986, he served as a Republican in the Illinois House of Representatives, from Chrisman, Illinois. He then served in the Illinois State Senate, from 1986 until his death in 1997. He died at the University of Chicago Hospitals in Chicago, Illinois. Judith A. Myers was appointed to Woodyard's state senate seat.

== Legacy ==
The Harry "Babe" Woodyard State Natural Area was named in honor of Woodyard.
