= Anne Stava =

American politician

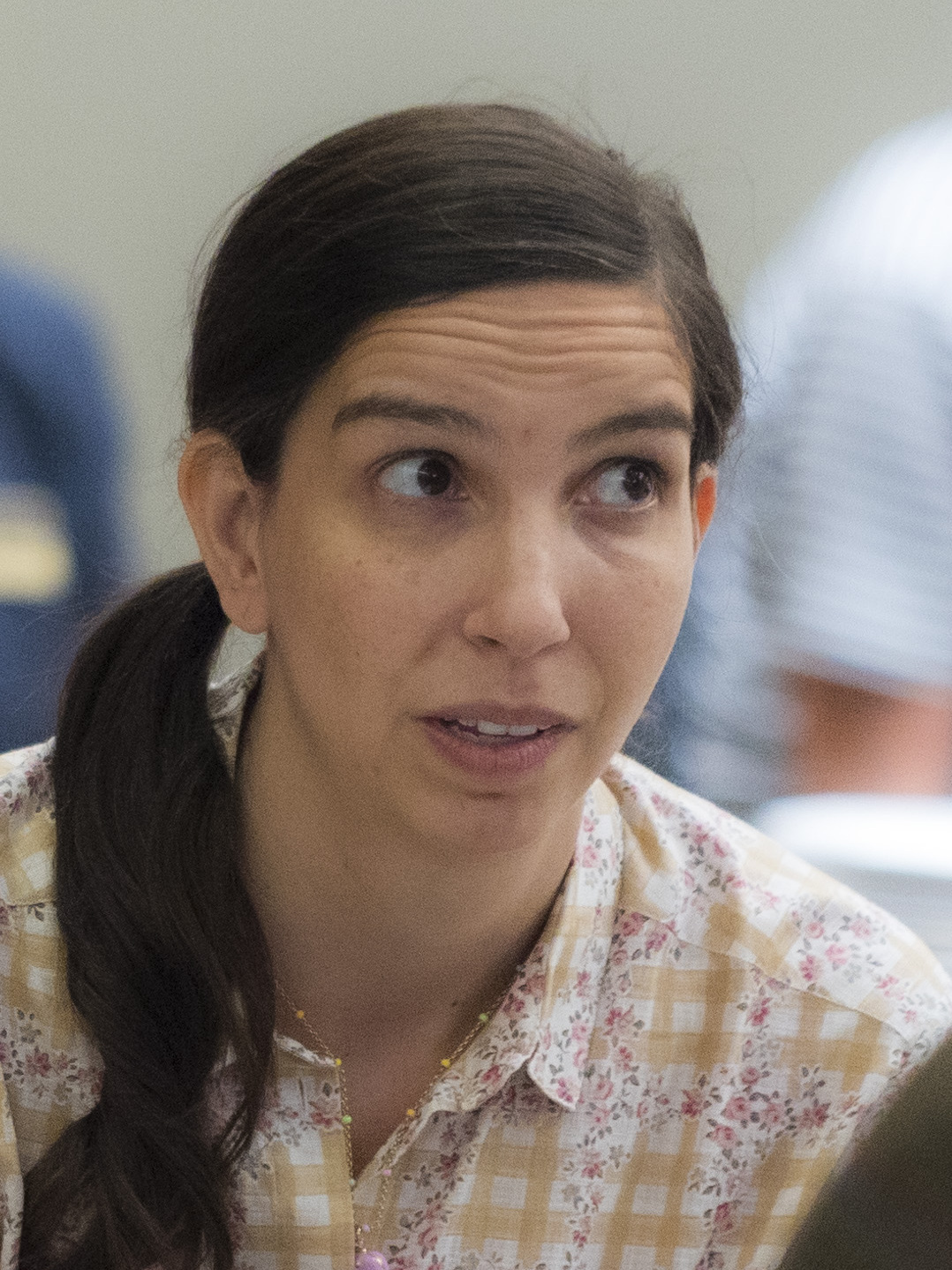
- Stava in 2025

Member of the Illinois House of Representatives from the 81st district
- Incumbent
- Assumed office January 9, 2019
- Preceded by: David S. Olsen

Personal details
- Born: Naperville, Illinois, US
- Party: Democratic
- Spouse: Sean Murray (div.)
- Children: 3
- Education: Dartmouth College

Anne Stava (formerly Stava-Murray) is a Democratic member of the Illinois House of Representatives for the 81st district. She took office on January 9, 2019. The 81st district, located in DuPage and Will counties, includes all or portions of Downers Grove, Lisle, Naperville, Woodridge, Darien, Westmont, and Bolingbrook. Stava is engaged to Marcus King, a candidate for DuPage County Board.

Stava narrowly defeated Republican incumbent David Olsen despite spending only $30,000 during the entire 2018 election cycle.

Stava, a Naperville resident, served on the community’s Board of Fire and Police. She is a graduate of Benet Academy and Dartmouth College.

Stava originally announced a run for the United States Senate in 2020 on January 1, 2019, but she would later call off the bid in March according to the Daily Herald, "largely because she found out she had been mistaken in her belief that [Dick] Durbin was not going to seek re-election," and chose to seek a second term as state representative.

As of July 3, 2022, Representative Stava is a member of the following Illinois House committees:

- Appropriations - Elementary & Secondary Education Committee (HAPE)
- Appropriations - Human Services Committee (HAPH)
- Citizen Impact Subcommittee (HMAC-CITI)
- Housing Committee (SHOU)
- Immigration & Human Rights Committee (SIHR)
- Judiciary - Criminal Committee (HJUC)
- Museums, Arts, & Cultural Enhancement Committee (HMAC)

== Electoral history ==
Illinois 81st State House District General Election, 2020
Party	Candidate	Votes	%
Democratic	Anne M. Stava-Murray (incumbent)	33,340	52.6%
Republican	Laura Hois	30,035	47.4%
Total votes		63,375	100.0

Illinois 81st State House District General Election, 2018
Party	Candidate	Votes	%
Democratic	Anne M. Stava-Murray	25,124	50.94
Republican	David S. Olsen (incumbent)	24,194	49.06
Total votes		49,318	100.0
