= Theresa Mah =

American politician

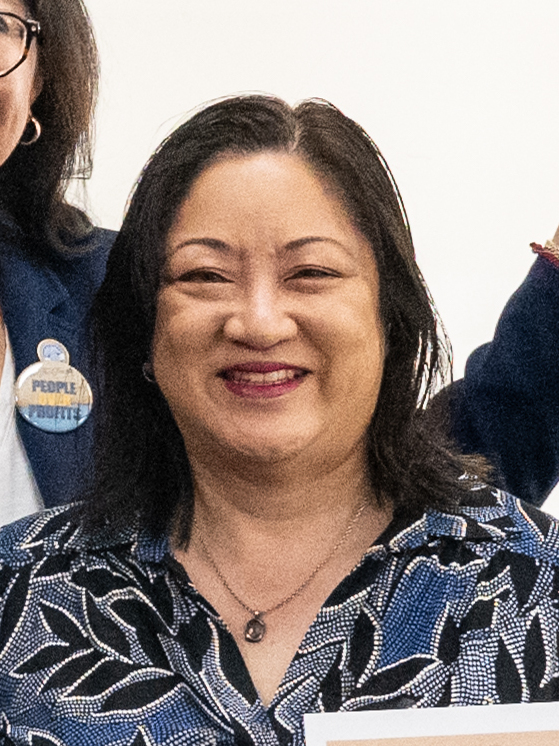
- Mah in 2025

Member of the Illinois House of Representatives
- Incumbent
- Assumed office January 10, 2017
- Preceded by: Edward Acevedo
- Constituency: 2nd (2017-2023); 24th (2023-present)

Personal details
- Born: San Francisco, California, U.S.
- Party: Democratic
- Education: University of California, Berkeley (BA); University of Chicago (MA, PhD)

Theresa Mah is a Democratic member of the Illinois House of Representatives who has represented the 24th district since 2023. She previously represented the 2nd district since January 2017 until being redistricted into the 24th district.

Mah was the first Asian American elected to the Illinois General Assembly. Mah is a co-chair of the Illinois House's Progressive Caucus.

== Early life, education, and career ==
Mah was born in Chinatown in San Francisco, California. She earned a B.A. in history from the University of California, Berkeley in 1991 and a Ph.D. in history from the University of Chicago in 1999. She has stated that her father's experience of being a "paper son" motivated her interest in studying Asian American history. Her dissertation was entitled "Buying into the Middle Class: Residential Segregation and Racial Formation in the United States, 1920–1964." She worked as an assistant professor at Bowling Green State University for six years.

She returned to Chicago in 2006 to work for the Illinois Coalition for Immigrant and Refugee Rights, and later worked for the Coalition for a Better Chinese American Community. During her time in the latter organization, she worked to ensure that the Chinese American population on Chicago's South Side was covered by one electoral district during the redistricting process. She also served as an advisor to Governor Pat Quinn.

== Illinois State Representative (2017-present) ==
=== Elections ===
In 2016, Mah ran as a Democrat for the Illinois House of Representatives' 2nd district seat, which was open due to incumbent Edward Acevedo's retirement. In the Democratic primary election, she defeated Alex Acevedo, the incumbent's son, with 51.25% of the vote. She ran unopposed in the general election, and won re-election in both 2018 and 2020. In 2022, following redistricting, she was re-elected as the representative for the 24th district.

=== Tenure ===
As Illinois State Representative, Mah has been a vocal advocate for immigrant rights, sponsoring a number of bills on the subject and appearing frequently at pro-immigrant rallies. Bills on which she has been a lead sponsor include legislation to prohibit LGBTQ discrimination in assisted or shared living facilities and to protect immigrants from discrimination by landlords.

In 2019, she was one of the co-founders of a new progressive caucus within the Illinois House of Representatives.

=== Committees ===
As of July 2, 2022, Representative Mah is a member in the following Illinois House committees:

- Appropriations – Elementary & Secondary Education Committee (HAPE)
- Financial Impact Subcommittee (HMAC-IMPA)
- Health Car Licenses Committee (HHCL)
- Housing Committee (SHOU)
- Immigration & Human Right Committee (SIHR)
- International Trade & Commerce Committee (HITC)
- Museums, Arts, & Cultural Enhancement Committee (HMAC)
- Redistricting Committee (HRED)
- Tourism Committee (SHTO)

== Other roles in politics ==
After winning the 2018 general election, J. B. Pritzker appointed Mah to his Transition Committee for Equality, Equity and Opportunity.

She supported the mayoral bids of Miguel del Valle in 2011 and Jesús "Chuy" García in 2015. In 2019, Mah supported Toni Preckwinkle's campaign for mayor. In the 2023 mayoral election, Mah criticized candidate Paul Vallas, describing him as “unfit” for office following a controversy surrounding "remarks on critical race theory". Mah endorsed García's 2023 candidacy for mayor.

In the 2024 Democratic primary, Mah defeated incumbent Committeeman George Cárdenas by an eight point margin in a three-way race to become Committeewoman of Chicago's 12th ward.

== Electoral history ==
=== 2016 ===
Illinois 2nd Representative District Democratic Primary, 2016
Party	Candidate	Votes	%
Democratic	Theresa Mah	10,732	51.23
Democratic	Alexander "Alex" Acevedo	10,217	48.77
Total votes		20,949	100.0

Illinois 2nd Representative District General Election, 2016
Party	Candidate	Votes	%
Democratic	Theresa Mah	23,813	100.0
Total votes		23,813	100.0

=== 2018 ===
Illinois 2nd Representative District General Election, 2018
Party	Candidate	Votes	%
Democratic	Theresa Mah (incumbent)	20,455	100.0
Total votes		20,455	100.0

=== 2020 ===
Illinois 2nd Representative District Democratic Primary, 2020
Party	Candidate	Votes	%
Democratic	Theresa Mah (incumbent)	10,580	67.29
Democratic	Bobby Martinez Olson	4,428	28.16
Democratic	Kenneth M. Kozlar	715	4.55
Total votes		15,723	100.0

Illinois 2nd Representative District General Election, 2020
Party	Candidate	Votes	%
Democratic	Theresa Mah (incumbent)	25,771	100.0
Total votes		25,771	100.0

=== 2022 ===
Illinois 24th Representative District Democratic Primary, 2022
Party	Candidate	Votes	%
Democratic	Theresa Mah	6,145	100.0
Total votes		6,145	100.0

Illinois 24th Representative District General Election, 2022
Party	Candidate	Votes	%
Democratic	Theresa Mah	14,532	100.0
Total votes		14,532	100.0
