= Illinois House of Representatives =

Lower house of the Illinois General Assembly

Coordinates: 39°47′53″N 89°39′18″W

- Illinois General Assembly

Type
- Type: Lower house
- Term limits: None

History
- New session started: January 8, 2025

Leadership
- Speaker: Chris Welch (D) since January 13, 2021
- Speaker pro tempore: Kam Buckner (D) since January 10, 2025
- Majority Leader: Robyn Gabel (D) since January 12, 2023
- Minority Leader: Tony McCombie (R) since January 11, 2023

Structure
- Seats: 118
- Political groups: Majority: Democratic (78); Minority: Republican (40)
- Length of term: 2 years
- Authority: Article IV, Illinois Constitution
- Salary: $93,712/year + per diem

Elections
- Last election: November 3, 2026
- Next election: November 7, 2028
- Redistricting: Legislative Control

Meeting place
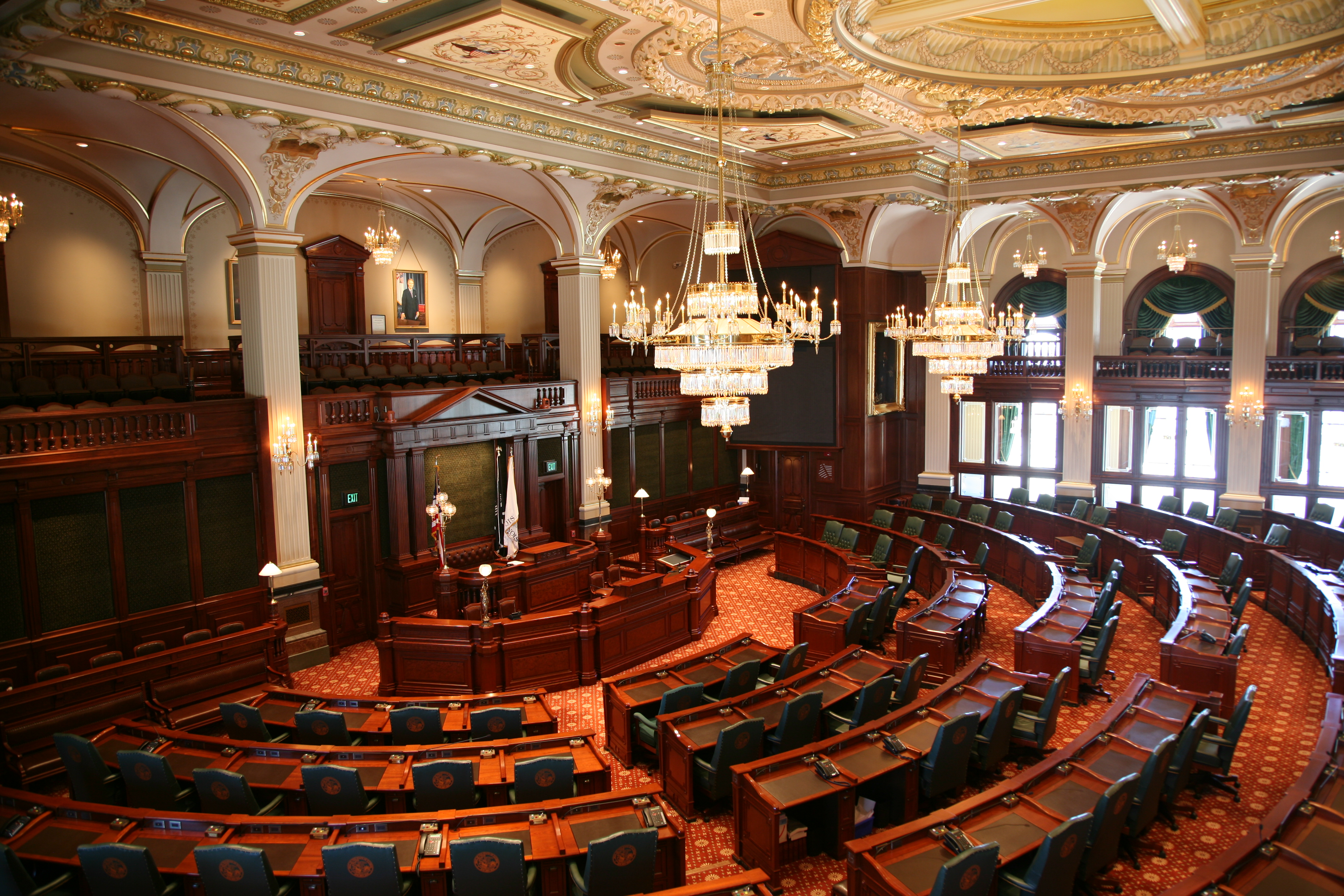
- House of Representatives Chamber; Illinois State Capitol; Springfield, Illinois

Website
- ilga.gov/house

Rules
- Rules of the House of Representatives of the 103rd General Assembly

The Illinois House of Representatives is the lower house of the Illinois General Assembly. The body was created by the first Illinois Constitution adopted in 1818. The House under the constitution as amended in 1980 consists of 118 representatives elected from individual legislative districts for two-year terms with no limits; redistricted every 10 years, based on the 2010 U.S. census each representative represents approximately 108,734 people.

The house has the power to pass bills and impeach Illinois officeholders. Lawmakers must be at least 21 years of age and a resident of the district in which they serve for at least two years.

== History ==
The Illinois General Assembly was created by the first Illinois Constitution adopted in 1818. The candidates for office split into political parties in the 1830s, initially as the Democratic and Whig parties, until the Whig candidates reorganized as Republicans in the 1850s.

Abraham Lincoln began his political career in the Illinois House of Representatives as a member of the Whig party in 1834. He served there until 1842. Although Republicans held the majority of seats in the Illinois House after 1860, in the next election it returned to the Democrats. The Democratic Party-led legislature worked to frame a new state constitution that was ultimately rejected by voters After the 1862 election, the Democratic-led Illinois House of Representatives passed resolutions denouncing the federal government's conduct of the war and urging an immediate armistice and peace convention, leading the Republican governor to suspend the legislature for the first time in the state's history. In 1864, Republicans swept the state legislature and at the time of Lincoln's assassination at Ford's Theater, Illinois stood as a solidly Republican state.

State House of Representatives were elected in multi-member districts through the cumulative voting election system from 1870 to 1980, except for 1964. The use of the cumulative voting election system secured a degree of representation for minority blacks and the non-dominant party through use of multi-member districts and special type of multiple voting. In 1980 Illinois was divided into 118 single-member districts. Since then each has used the first-past-the-post voting election system.

From 1870 to 1980, Illinois's lower house had several unique features:

- The House had 153, later 177 members. The state was divided into 51, then later 59 legislative districts, each of which elected one senator and three representatives.
- Elections for the state house were conducted using cumulative voting; each individual voter was given three votes to cast for House seats, and they could distribute them to three candidates (one vote each), one candidate (receiving three votes—this was called a bullet vote) or two candidates (each receiving 1½ votes). (The only historic exception to the universal use of cumulative voting 1870-1980 was the 1964 state-wide at-large election.)
- Though not constitutionally mandated, the two parties had an informal agreement that they would only run two candidates per district. Thus, in most districts, only four candidates were running for three seats. This not only all but guaranteed that the district's minority party would win a seat (particularly outside Chicago), but usually assured that each party would have significant representation—a minimum of one-third of the seats (59 out of 177)—in the House. (The only historic exception to the minimum 59 seat rule was in 1875 and during WWI.)

=== Cutback Amendment of 1980 ===
The Cutback Amendment was proposed to abolish Illinois's use of Cumulative Voting and multi-member districts.

Since its passage in 1980, representatives have been elected from 118 single-member districts formed by dividing the 59 Senate districts in half, a method known as nesting. Each senator is "associated" with two representatives.

Since the adoption of the Cutback Amendment, there have been proposals by some major political figures in Illinois to bring back multi-member districts. A task force led by former governor Jim Edgar and former federal judge Abner Mikva issued a report in 2001 calling for the revival of cumulative voting, in part because it appears that such a system increases the representation of racial minorities in elected office. The Chicago Tribune editorialized in 1995 that the multi-member districts elected with cumulative voting produced better legislators. Others said the now-abandoned system produced greater stability in the lower house.

The Democratic Party won a majority of House seats in 1982. Except for a brief two-year period of Republican control from 1995 to 1997, the Democrats have held the majority since then.

=== Firsts ===
The first two African-American legislators in Illinois were John W. E. Thomas, first elected in 1876, and George French Ecton, elected in 1886. In 1922, Lottie Holman O'Neill became the first woman elected to the Illinois House of Representatives (she was elected in the first election in which women could vote or run for election). In 1958, Floy Clements became the first African American woman to serve as state Representative. In 1982, Joseph Berrios became the first Hispanic American state representative. Theresa Mah became the first Asian American to serve in the Illinois House when she was sworn into office January 10, 2017. On January 11, 2023, Abdelnasser Rashid and Nabeela Syed became the first representatives in the Illinois General Assembly of Muslim faith, with Rashid becoming the first Palestinian-American representative to serve in the Illinois legislative body.

== Powers ==
The Illinois House of Representatives meets at the Illinois State Capitol in Springfield, Illinois. It is required to convene on the second Wednesday of January each year. Along with the Illinois Senate and governor, it is vested with the power to make laws, come up with a state budget, act on federal constitutional amendments, and propose constitutional amendments to the state constitution. The Illinois House of Representatives also holds the power to impeach executive and judicial officials.

== Qualifications ==
A person must be a U.S. citizen and two-year resident of an electoral district of at least 21 years of age to serve in the Illinois House of Representatives. Members of the House cannot hold other public offices or receive appointments by the governor while in office.

== Composition of the House ==
Affiliation	Party (Shading indicates majority caucus)		Total	Vacant
Affiliation	Democratic	Republican	Total	Vacant
2017–2019	67	51	118	0
2019–2021	74	44	118	0
2021–2023	73	45	118	0
2023–2025	78	40	118	0
Begin 2025	78	40	118	0
Latest voting share	66.1%	33.9%		

== Leadership ==
The current Speaker of the Illinois House of Representatives is Emanuel Chris Welch, a Democrat from Hillside, who represents the 7th district. The Democratic Party of Illinois currently holds a super-majority of seats in the House. Under the Constitution of Illinois, the office of minority leader is recognized for the purpose of making certain appointments. Tony McCombie, of Savanna, who represents the 89th district, currently holds that post. Both leaders appointed their leadership teams shortly after the start of the 103rd General Assembly.

=== Majority ===
- Speaker of the House: Emanuel Chris Welch
- Majority Leader: Robyn Gabel
- Speaker pro tempore: Kam Buckner
- Deputy Majority Leaders:
  - Mary E. Flowers (until May 31, 2023)
  - Elizabeth Hernandez
- Assistant Majority Leaders:
  - Marcus C. Evans Jr.
  - Jay Hoffman
  - Natalie Manley
  - Aaron Ortiz
  - Kam Buckner
  - Barbara Hernandez
  - Kelly Burke
  - Robert Rita
- Majority Conference Chairperson: Theresa Mah
- Majority Officer & Sergeant at Arms: Nick Smith

=== Minority ===
- Minority Leader: Tony McCombie
- Deputy Minority Leaders:
  - Norine Hammond
  - Ryan Spain
- Assistant Minority Leaders:
  - John Cabello
  - Charles Meier
  - Mike Marron
  - C. D. Davidsmeyer
  - Jackie Haas
- Minority Conference Chairperson: Jeff Keicher
- Minority Floor Leader: Patrick Windhorst

== Officers ==
- Clerk of the House: John W. Hollman
- Chief Doorkeeper: Nicole Hill
- Parliamentarian: Kat Bray
- Assistant Clerk of the House: Bradley S. Bolin

== Members ==
As of September 9, 2026, the 104th General Assembly of the Illinois House of Representatives consists of the following members:

District	Representative	Party	Start	Residence
1	Aaron Ortiz	Democratic	January 9, 2019	Chicago
2	Elizabeth Hernandez	Democratic	January 10, 2007	Cicero
3	Eva-Dina Delgado	Democratic	November 15, 2019 (Note: Originally appointed.)	Chicago
4	Lilian Jiménez	Democratic	December 15, 2022 (Note: Appointed after being elected, but prior to inauguration day of the General Assembly to which they were elected.)	Chicago
5	Kimberly du Buclet	Democratic	May 15, 2023	Chicago
6	Sonya Harper	Democratic	October 20, 2015	Chicago
7	Emanuel Chris Welch	Democratic	January 9, 2013	Hillside
8	La Shawn Ford	Democratic	January 10, 2007	Chicago
9	Yolonda Morris	Democratic	September 12, 2023	Chicago
10	Jawaharial Williams	Democratic	May 1, 2019	Chicago
11	Ann Williams	Democratic	January 12, 2011	Chicago
12	Margaret Croke	Democratic	January 2, 2021	Chicago
13	Hoan Huynh	Democratic	January 11, 2023	Chicago
14	Kelly Cassidy	Democratic	April 12, 2011	Chicago
15	Michael Kelly	Democratic	November 23, 2021	Chicago
16	Kevin Olickal	Democratic	January 11, 2023	Skokie
17	Jennifer Gong-Gershowitz	Democratic	December 21, 2018	Glenview
18	Robyn Gabel	Democratic	April 19, 2010	Evanston
19	Lindsey LaPointe	Democratic	July 24, 2019	Chicago
20	Bradley Stephens	Republican	June 29, 2019	Rosemont
21	Abdelnasser Rashid	Democratic	January 11, 2023	Justice
22	Angelica Guerrero-Cuellar	Democratic	February 25, 2021	Chicago
23	Edgar González Jr.	Democratic	January 10, 2020	Chicago
24	Theresa Mah	Democratic	January 11, 2017	Chicago
25	Curtis Tarver	Democratic	January 9, 2019	Chicago
26	Kam Buckner	Democratic	January 18, 2019	Chicago
27	Justin Slaughter	Democratic	January 5, 2017	Chicago
28	Robert Rita	Democratic	January 8, 2003	Blue Island
29	Thaddeus Jones	Democratic	January 12, 2011	Calumet City
30	Will Davis	Democratic	January 8, 2003	Homewood
31	Michael Crawford	Democratic	January 8, 2025	Chicago
32	Lisa Davis	Democratic	January 8, 2025	Chicago
33	Marcus C. Evans Jr.	Democratic	April 13, 2012	Chicago
34	Nicholas Smith	Democratic	February 4, 2018	Chicago
35	Mary Gill	Democratic	March 28, 2023	Chicago
36	Rick Ryan	Democratic	January 8, 2025	Evergreen Park
37	Patrick Sheehan	Republican	April 13, 2024	Lockport
38	Debbie Meyers-Martin	Democratic	January 9, 2019	Olympia Fields
39	Will Guzzardi	Democratic	January 14, 2015	Chicago
40	Jaime Andrade Jr.	Democratic	August 12, 2013	Chicago
41	Janet Yang Rohr	Democratic	January 13, 2021	Naperville
42	Margaret DeLaRosa	Democratic	October 12, 2025	Glen Ellyn
43	Anna Moeller	Democratic	March 30, 2014	Elgin
44	Fred Crespo	Democratic	January 10, 2007	Hoffman Estates
45	Martha Deuter	Democratic	January 8, 2025	Elmhurst
46	Diane Blair-Sherlock	Democratic	December 7, 2022	Villa Park
47	Amy Grant	Republican	January 9, 2019	Wheaton
48	Jennifer Sanalitro	Republican	January 11, 2023	Hanover Park
49	Maura Hirschauer	Democratic	January 13, 2021	Batavia
50	Barbara Hernandez	Democratic	March 7, 2019	Aurora
51	Nabeela Syed	Democratic	January 11, 2023	Inverness
52	Martin McLaughlin	Republican	January 13, 2021	Barrington Hills
53	Nicolle Grasse	Democratic	June 5, 2024	Arlington Heights
54	Mary Beth Canty	Democratic	January 11, 2023	Arlington Heights
55	Justin Cochran	Democratic	December 30, 2025	Des Plaines
56	Michelle Mussman	Democratic	January 12, 2011	Schaumburg
57	Tracy Katz Muhl	Democratic	January 11, 2024	Northbrook
58	Bob Morgan	Democratic	January 9, 2019	Deerfield
59	Daniel Didech	Democratic	January 9, 2019	Buffalo Grove
60	Rita Mayfield	Democratic	July 6, 2010	Waukegan
61	Joyce Mason	Democratic	January 9, 2019	Gurnee
62	Laura Faver Dias	Democratic	January 11, 2023	Grayslake
63	Steve Reick	Republican	January 11, 2017	Woodstock
64	Tom Weber	Republican	January 9, 2019	Lake Villa
65	Dan Ugaste	Republican	January 9, 2019	Geneva
66	Suzanne Ness	Democratic	January 13, 2021	Crystal Lake
67	Maurice West	Democratic	January 9, 2019	Rockford
68	Dave Vella	Democratic	January 13, 2021	Rockford
69	Joe Sosnowski	Republican	January 12, 2011	Rockford
70	Jeff Keicher	Republican	July 5, 2018	DeKalb
71	Daniel Swanson	Republican	January 11, 2017	Woodhull
72	Gregg Johnson	Democratic	January 11, 2023	East Moline
73	Ryan Spain	Republican	January 11, 2017	Peoria
74	Bradley Fritts	Republican	January 11, 2023	Dixon
75	Jed Davis	Republican	January 11, 2023	Newark
76	Murri Briel	Democratic	January 8, 2025	Ottawa
77	Norma Hernandez	Democratic	January 11, 2023	Melrose Park
78	Camille Lilly	Democratic	April 27, 2010	Chicago
79	Jackie Haas	Republican	December 8, 2020	Bourbonnais
80	Anthony DeLuca	Democratic	March 6, 2009	Chicago Heights
81	Anne Stava-Murray	Democratic	January 9, 2019	Downers Grove
82	Nicole La Ha	Republican	December 20, 2023	Homer Glen
83	Matt Hanson	Democratic	January 11, 2023	Aurora
84	Stephanie Kifowit	Democratic	January 9, 2013	Oswego
85	Dagmara Avelar	Democratic	January 13, 2021	Bolingbrook
86	Lawrence M. Walsh Jr.	Democratic	April 30, 2012	Elwood
87	Bill Hauter	Republican	January 1, 2023	Morton
88	Regan Deering	Republican	January 8, 2025	Decatur
89	Tony McCombie	Republican	January 11, 2017	Savanna
90	John Cabello	Republican	January 11, 2023	Rockford
91	Sharon Chung	Democratic	January 11, 2023	Bloomington
92	Jehan Gordon-Booth	Democratic	January 14, 2009	Peoria
93	Travis Weaver	Republican	January 11, 2023	Edwards
94	Norine Hammond	Republican	December 14, 2010	Macomb
95	Michael Coffey	Republican	January 11, 2023	Springfield
96	Sue Scherer	Democratic	January 9, 2013	Decatur
97	Jessica Dixon Heitman	Democratic	July 20, 2026	Plainfield
98	Natalie Manley	Democratic	January 9, 2013	Joliet
99	Kyle Moore	Republican	January 8, 2025	Quincy
100	C. D. Davidsmeyer	Republican	December 12, 2012	Jacksonville
101	Chris Miller	Republican	January 9, 2019	Charleston
102	Adam Niemerg	Republican	January 13, 2021	Dieterich
103	Carol Ammons	Democratic	January 14, 2015	Urbana
104	Brandun Schweizer	Republican	December 21, 2023	Danville
105	Dennis Tipsword	Republican	January 11, 2023	Eureka
106	Jason Bunting	Republican	February 4, 2023	Emington
107	Brad Halbrook	Republican	January 11, 2017	Shelbyville
108	Wayne Rosenthal	Republican	January 11, 2023	Morrisonville
109	Charles Meier	Republican	January 9, 2013	Okawville
110	Blaine Wilhour	Republican	January 9, 2019	Beecher City
111	Amy Elik	Republican	January 13, 2021	Fosterburg
112	Katie Stuart	Democratic	January 11, 2017	Edwardsville
113	Jay Hoffman	Democratic	January 9, 2013	Swansea
114	Kevin Schmidt	Republican	January 11, 2023	Millstadt
115	David Friess	Republican	January 13, 2021	Red Bud
116	Dave Severin	Republican	January 11, 2017	Benton
117	Patrick Windhorst	Republican	January 9, 2019	Metropolis
118	Scott Doody	Republican	June 25, 2026	Anna
