= Illinois's 10th House of Representatives district =

American legislative district

Illinois's 10th State House of Representatives district
Representative
Jawaharial Williams; D–Chicago
since 2019
- Demographics: 31.0% White; 43.7% Black; 18.9% Hispanic; 3.1% Asian; 0.1% Native American; 0.0% Hawaiian/Pacific Islander; 0.3% Other; 2.8% Multiracial
- Population (2020): 114,021
- Created: 1983–present 1849–1873, 1957–1973

Illinois's 10th House of Representatives district is a Representative district within the Illinois House of Representatives located in Cook County, Illinois. It has been represented by Democrat Jawaharial Williams since May 17, 2019. The district was previously represented by Democrat Melissa Conyears-Ervin from 2017 to 2019.

The district includes parts of the Chicago neighborhoods of Austin, East Garfield Park, Humboldt Park, Lincoln Park, Logan Square, Near North Side, Near West Side, West Garfield Park, and West Town.

== Representative district history ==
Prior to the ratification of the 1848 Illinois Constitution, counties (or two or more counties) were designated a certain number of Senators and Representatives. With the ratification of the 1848 Illinois Constitution, Legislative and Representative districts were numbered and called by name. Each district was still assigned a certain number of Senators and Representatives. After the passage of the 1872 Apportionment, only Legislative districts were drawn with Representatives elected cumulatively. The 1954 amendment to the 1870 Illinois Constitution established Representative districts as separate from Legislative districts (with representatives still elected cumulatively). The boundaries of Representative and Legislative districts would differ. After the United States Supreme Court ruled in Reynolds v. Sims (1964) that "both houses of state legislatures must be apportioned according to districts of equal population," new districts were redrawn for the Illinois Senate and Illinois House of Representatives. While the Legislative districts were redrawn, the Governor and General Assembly failed to agree on Representative district boundaries. Under the 1954 amendment, "a 10-man bipartisan commission appointed by the governor from recommendations made by both parties" were directed to redraw boundaries but failed to do so in 1963. Because of this failure, and with no district boundaries redrawn, all Representative districts were temporarily merged into one at-large district with 177 representatives (the total number of representatives at the time). The 1964 Illinois House election had several candidates running for all 177 seats throughout the state. In 1965, the Representative districts were redrawn by the Illinois Legislative Reapportionment Commission and elections held in 1966 were done with separate districts. With the 1971 Apportionment (and adoption of the 1970 Illinois Constitution), Representative districts were abolished and representatives were once again elected cumulatively per Legislative district. After the passage of the Cutback Amendment in 1980, the number of Representatives was reduced from 177 to 118 with Representative districts re-established and now electing a single representative.

== Prominent representatives ==
Representative	Notes
James C. Allen	Elected to the U.S. House of Representatives from Illinois's 7th congressional district (1853 – 1856); Elected back to the U.S. House of Representatives from Illinois's 7th congressional district (1856 – 1857); Elected Clerk of the United States House of Representatives (1857 – 1860); Elected back to the U.S. House of Representatives from Illinois's at-large congressional district (1863 – 1865)

== List of representatives ==
=== 1849 – 1873 ===
Representative	Party	Years (Note: From 1870 to 1970, the GA met for a new session on the Wednesday after the first Monday of January.)	General Assembly (GA)	Electoral history	Counties represented
10th Representative district established with 1848 Illinois Constitution.
Richard G. Morris	Democratic	January 1, 1849 – January 6, 1851	16th	Elected in 1848; Was not re-elected in 1850.	Crawford; Jasper
James C. Allen	Democratic	January 6, 1851 – January 3, 1853	17th	Elected in 1850; Elected to the U.S. House of Representatives from Illinois's 7th congressional district in 1852.	Crawford; Jasper
William H. Sterrett	Democratic	January 3, 1853 – January 1, 1855	18th	Elected in 1852; Was not re-elected in 1854.	Crawford; Jasper
C. C. Hopkins	Democratic	January 1, 1855 – January 5, 1857	19th	Elected in 1854; Was not re-elected in 1856.	Edwards; Wayne
Charles P. Burns	Unknown	January 5, 1857 – January 3, 1859	20th	Elected in 1856; Was not re-elected in 1858.	Edwards; Wayne
Robert T. Forth	Democratic	January 3, 1859 – January 7, 1861	21st	Elected in 1858; Was not re-elected in 1860.	Edwards; Wayne
Nathan Crews	Unknown	January 7, 1861 – January 5, 1863	22nd	Elected in 1860; Was not re-elected in 1862.	Edwards; Wayne
James W. Heard	Unknown	January 5, 1863 – January 2, 1865	23rd	Elected in 1862; Was not re-elected in 1864.	Hamilton; Wayne
Valentine S. Benson	Democratic	January 2, 1865 – January 7, 1867	24th	Elected in 1864; Was not re-elected in 1866.	Hamilton; Wayne
Robert P. Harna	Unknown	January 7, 1867 – January 4, 1869	25th	Elected in 1866; Was not re-elected in 1868.	Hamilton; Wayne
John Halley	Democratic	January 4, 1869 – January 4, 1871	26th	Elected in 1868; Was not re-elected in 1870.	Hamilton; Wayne
Frank E. Hay	Democratic	January 4, 1871 – January 8, 1873	27th	Elected in 1870; Was not re-elected in 1872.	White
District abolished with 1872 Reapportionment as 3 Representatives were now elected cumulatively from Legislative districts.

=== 1957 – 1973 ===
Representative	Party	Party Control	Years (Note: Since 1970, the GA meets on the second Wednesday of January for a new session.)	General Assembly (GA)	Electoral history	Counties represented
District re-established in 1957.
Kenneth R. Wendt	Democratic	2 Democrats; 1 Republican	January 9, 1957 – January 9, 1963	70th 71st 72nd	Redistricted from the 31st Legislative district and re-elected in 1956; Re-elected in 1958; Re-elected in 1960; Retired.	Cook
Albert W. Hachmeister	Republican	2 Democrats; 1 Republican	January 9, 1957 – January 6, 1965	70th 71st 72nd 73rd	Redistricted from the 31st Legislative district and re-elected in 1956; Re-elected in 1958; Re-elected in 1960; Re-elected in 1962; Ran in the At-large district election and won re-election in 1964.	Cook
Carl W. Stolteben	Democratic	2 Democrats; 1 Republican	January 9, 1957 – January 7, 1959	70th	Elected in 1956; Retired.	Cook
Frank Lyman	Democratic	2 Democrats; 1 Republican	January 7, 1959 – January 6, 1965	71st 72nd 73rd	Elected in 1958; Re-elected in 1960; Re-elected in 1962; Ran in the At-large district election and won re-election in 1964.	Cook
John Merlo	Democratic	2 Democrats; 1 Republican	January 9, 1963 – January 6, 1965	73rd	Elected in 1962; Ran in the At-large district election and won re-election in 1964.	Cook
The district was temporarily abolished from 1965 to 1967 due to the Redistricting Commission in 1963 failing to reach an agreement. An at-large election was held electing 177 Representatives from across the state.
Michael F. Zlatnik	Republican	2 Republicans; 1 Democrat	January 4, 1967 – January 8, 1969	75th	Elected in 1966; Lost election for judgeship on the Circuit Court of Cook County in 1968.	Cook
Paul Elward	Democratic	2 Republicans; 1 Democrat	January 4, 1967 – January 13, 1971	75th 76th	Redistricted from the at-large district and re-elected in 1966; Re-elected in 1968; Elected to the Circuit Court of Cook County in 1970.	Cook
Edward J. Copeland	Republican	2 Republicans; 1 Democrat	January 4, 1967 – January 13, 1971	75th 76th	Elected in 1966; Re-elected in 1968; Retired.	Cook
Arthur Berman	Democratic	2 Democrats; 1 Republican	January 8, 1969 – January 10, 1973	76th 77th	Elected in 1968; Re-elected in 1970; Redistricted to the 11th Legislative district and re-elected in 1972.	Cook
Daniel J. O'Brien	Democratic	2 Democrats; 1 Republican	January 13, 1971 – January 10, 1973	77th	Elected in 1970; Retired.	Cook
Michael F. Zlatnik	Republican	2 Democrats; 1 Republican	January 13, 1971 – January 10, 1973	77th	Elected back in 1970; Retired.	Cook
District abolished with 1971 Reapportionment as Representatives were once again elected from Legislative districts.

=== 1983 – Present ===
Representative	Party	Years	General Assembly (GA)	Electoral history	Counties represented
District re-established with representatives now elected one per district with the passage of the Cutback Amendment
Myron Kulas	Democratic	January 12, 1983 – 1992/1993	83rd 84th 85th 86th 87th	Redistricted from the 19th Legislative district and re-elected in 1982; Re-elected in 1984; Re-elected in 1986; Re-elected in 1988; Re-elected in 1990; Redistricted to the 33rd Representative district, lost renomination in 1992, and resigned his 10th district seat during the 87th GA.	Cook
Vacant		1992/1993 – 1992/1993	87th		Cook
Coy Pugh	Democratic	1992/1993 – 2000/2001	87th 88th 89th 90th 91st	Elected in 1992 and appointed during the 87th GA; Re-elected in 1994; Re-elected in 1996; Re-elected in 1998; Lost renomination and resigned during the 91st GA	Cook
Vacant		2000/2001 – 2000/2001	91st		Cook
Annazette Collins	Democratic	2000/2001 – March 16, 2011	91st 92nd 93rd 94th 95th 96th 97th	Elected in 2000 and appointed during the 91st GA; Re-elected in 2002; Re-elected in 2004; Re-elected in 2006; Re-elected in 2008; Re-elected in 2010; Appointed as state Senator for the 5th Legislative district in 2011.	Cook
Vacant		March 16, 2011 – March 24, 2011	97th		Cook
Derrick Smith	Democratic	March 24, 2011 – August 17, 2012	97th	Appointed in 2011; Expelled from the state House in 2012.	Cook
Vacant		August 17, 2012 – September 9, 2012	97th		Cook
Eddie Winters	Democratic	September 9, 2012 – January 9, 2013	97th	Appointed to fill the remainder of Derrick Smith's term.	Cook
Derrick Smith	Democratic	January 9, 2013 – June 11, 2014	98th	Elected back in 2012; Lost renomination and expelled again from the state House in 2014.	Cook
Vacant		June 11, 2014 – January 14, 2015	98th		Cook
Pamela Reaves-Harris	Democratic	January 14, 2015 – January 11, 2017	99th	Elected in 2014; Retired.	Cook
Melissa Conyears	Democratic	January 11, 2017 – April/May 2019	100th 101st	Elected in 2016; Re-elected in 2018; Elected City Treasurer of Chicago and resigned her state House seat in 2019.	Cook
Vacant		April/May 2019 – May 17, 2019	101st		Cook
Jawaharial Williams	Democratic	May 17, 2019 – present	101st 102nd 103rd	Appointed in 2019; Elected in 2020; Re-elected in 2022	Cook

== Historic District Boundaries ==
Years	County	Municipalities/Townships	Notes
2013 – present	Cook	Chicago (Austin, East Garfield Park, Humboldt Park, Lincoln Park, Logan Square, Near North Side, Near West Side, West Garfield Park, West Town)	
2003 – 2013	Cook	Chicago	
1993 – 2003	Cook		
1983 – 1993	Cook	Chicago	
1967 – 1973	Cook	Chicago	
1957 – 1965	Cook	Chicago	
1871 – 1873	White	Burnt Prairie, Carmi, Elm Grove, Emma, Enfield, Grayville, Hawthorne, Liberty, Mill Shoals, New Haven, Phillipstown, Roland, Sacramento, Shadsville, Springerville, Trumbull	
1863 – 1871	Hamilton; Wayne	Baltimore, Bear Creek, Bennington, Blue Point, Burnt Prairie, Enterprise, Fairfield, Griswold, Jefferson City, Johnsonville, Kendall, Lanes Roads, Leiches Mill, Logansport, Macedonia, Marge Grove, Massillon, Maulding's Mill, McLeansboro, Middleton, Mount Erie, New Franklin, Palo Alto, Wabash	
1855 – 1863	Edwards; Wayne	Albion, Baltimore, Blue Point, Enterprise, Fairfield, Grayville, Johnsonville, Kendall, Leiches Mill, Maple Grove, Massilon, Maulding's Mill, Middleton, Mount Erie, New Franklin, West Salem	
1849 – 1855	Crawford; Jasper	Bellair, Elkton, Hutsonville, Newton, Palestine, Robinson, Rose Hill, Ste. Marie, Vernon, York (West York)	

== Electoral history ==
=== 2030 – 2022 ===
2022 Illinois House of Representatives election
Party	Candidate	Votes	%
Democratic	Jawaharial "Omar" Williams (incumbent)	24,344	100.0
Total votes		24,344	100.0

=== 2020 – 2012 ===
2020 Illinois House of Representatives election
Party	Candidate	Votes	%
Democratic	Jawaharial "Omar" Williams (incumbent)	38,256	100.0
Total votes		38,256	100.0

2018 Illinois House of Representatives election
Party	Candidate	Votes	%
Democratic	Melissa Conyears-Ervin (incumbent)	31,649	100.0
Total votes		31,649	100.0

2016 Illinois House of Representatives election
Party	Candidate	Votes	%	±%
Democratic	Melissa Conyears	35,858	83.84	−1.46%
Republican	Mark Spognardi	6,911	16.16	+1.46%
Total votes		42,769	100.0	

2014 Illinois House of Representatives election
Party	Candidate	Votes	%	±%
Democratic	Pamela Reaves-Harris	21,102	85.30	+22.42%
Republican	Mark Calonder	3,638	14.70	N/A
Total votes		24,740	100.0	

2014 Illinois House of Representatives Democratic primary
Party	Candidate	Votes	%
Democratic	Pamela Reaves-Harris	2,688	42.59
Democratic	Derrick Smith (incumbent)	2,375	37.63
Democratic	Eddie Winters	757	11.99
Democratic	Beverly Perteet	310	4.91
Democratic	Antwan D. Hampton	181	2.87
Total votes		6,898	100.0

2012 Illinois House of Representatives election
Party	Candidate	Votes	%	±%
Democratic	Derrick Smith (incumbent)	25,417	62.88	−37.12%
10th District Unity	Lance Tyson	15,007	37.12	N/A
Total votes		40,424	100.0	

=== 2010 – 2002 ===
2010 Illinois House of Representatives election
Party	Candidate	Votes	%
Democratic	Annazette R. Collins (incumbent)	19,427	100.0
Total votes		19,427	100.0

2008 Illinois House of Representatives election
Party	Candidate	Votes	%
Democratic	Annazette R. Collins (incumbent)	33,577	100.0
Total votes		33,577	100.0

2006 Illinois House of Representatives election
Party	Candidate	Votes	%
Democratic	Annazette R. Collins (incumbent)	19,662	100.0
Total votes		19,662	100.0

2004 Illinois House of Representatives election
Party	Candidate	Votes	%	±%
Democratic	Annazette R. Collins (incumbent)	30,688	86.61	−13.39%
Republican	Thomas M. Swiss	4,746	13.39	N/A
Total votes		35,434	100.0	

2002 Illinois House of Representatives election
Party	Candidate	Votes	%
Democratic	Annazette R. Collins (incumbent)	19,179	100.0
Total votes		19,179	100.0

=== 2000 – 1992 ===
2000 Illinois House of Representatives election
Party	Candidate	Votes	%
Democratic	Annazette R. Collins	25,330	100.0
Total votes		25,330	100.0

2000 Illinois House of Representatives Democratic primary
Party	Candidate	Votes	%
Democratic	Annazette R. Collins	4,827	43.51
Democratic	Coy Pugh (incumbent)	4,575	41.24
Democratic	Dorothy Pugh	1,692	15.25
Total votes		11,094	100.0

1998 Illinois House of Representatives election
Party	Candidate	Votes	%
Democratic	Coy Pugh (incumbent)	19,565	100.0
Total votes		19,565	100.0

1996 Illinois House of Representatives election
Party	Candidate	Votes	%	±%
Democratic	Coy Pugh (incumbent)	23,699	95.10	−4.90%
Republican	Earnest L. Thomas	1,222	4.90	N/A
Total votes		24,921	100.0	

1994 Illinois House of Representatives election
Party	Candidate	Votes	%
Democratic	Coy Pugh (incumbent)	13,065	100.0
Total votes		13,065	100.0

1992 Illinois House of Representatives election
Party	Candidate	Votes	%	±%
Democratic	Coy Pugh	27,493	92.24	+10.56%
Republican	Glenn E. God Bold	2,313	7.76	−10.56%
Total votes		29,806	100.0	

=== 1990 – 1982 ===
1990 Illinois House of Representatives election
Party	Candidate	Votes	%	±%
Democratic	Myron J. Kulas (incumbent)	10,536	81.68	+0.97%
Republican	Henry Santiago	2,363	18.32	−0.97%
Total votes		12,899	100.0	

1988 Illinois House of Representatives election
Party	Candidate	Votes	%	±%
Democratic	Myron J. Kulas (incumbent)	16,222	80.71	−3.51%
Republican	Frank S. Sliva, Jr.	3,877	19.29	+3.51%
Total votes		20,099	100.0	

1986 Illinois House of Representatives election
Party	Candidate	Votes	%	±%
Democratic	Myron J. Kulas (incumbent)	12,708	84.22	−15.78%
Republican	Dennis F. Villare	2,381	15.78	N/A
Total votes		15,089	100.0	

1984 Illinois House of Representatives election
Party	Candidate	Votes	%
Democratic	Myron J. Kulas (incumbent)	16,275	100.0
Write-in		1	0.00
Total votes		16,726	100.0

1982 Illinois House of Representatives election
Party	Candidate	Votes	%
Democratic	Myron J. Kulas	21,904	100.0
Total votes		21,904	100.0

=== 1970 – 1962 ===
1970 Illinois House of Representatives election
Party	Candidate	Votes	%
Democratic	Arthur L. Berman (incumbent)	66,858	32.29
Democratic	Daniel J. O'Brien	61,062	29.49
Republican	Michael F. Zlatnik	39,851.5	19.25
Republican	Ray Jeffrey Cohen	39,272.5	18.97
Total votes		207,044	100.0

1968 Illinois House of Representatives election
Party	Candidate	Votes	%
Democratic	Paul F. Elward (incumbent)	73,506.5	28.48
Democratic	Arthur L. Berman	72,327.5	28.03
Republican	Edward J. Copeland (incumbent)	55,915.5	21.67
Republican	Donald J. Stefans	52,582.5	20.38
Citizens for Political Action	Anthony J. Murray, Jr.	1,531	0.59
Citizens for Political Action	Betsy J. Vazquez	1,326.5	0.51
Citizens for Political Action	Martin J. Noone	864	0.33
Total votes		258,053.5	100.0

1966 Illinois House of Representatives election
Party	Candidate	Votes	%
Republican	Michael F. Zlatnik	62,181	22.48
Democratic	Paul F. Elward	55,430.5	20.04
Republican	Edward J. Copeland	54,674	19.77
Democratic	Nicholas Zagone	48,855.5	17.66
Total votes		276,571.5	100.0

1962 Illinois House of Representatives election
Party	Candidate	Votes	%
Democratic	John Merlo	41,762.5	27.33
Democratic	Frank Lyman (incumbent)	38,818.5	25.41
Republican	Albert W. Hachmeister (incumbent)	36,424	23.84
Republican	Marshall Ravich	35,778	23.42
Total votes		152,784	100.0

=== 1960 – 1956 ===
1960 Illinois House of Representatives election
Party	Candidate	Votes	%
Democratic	Kenneth R. Wendt (incumbent)	59,665	29.55
Democratic	Frank Lyman (incumbent)	54,940.5	27.21
Republican	Albert W. Hachmeister (incumbent)	45,953	22.76
Republican	Melvin A. Brandt	41,384	20.49
Total votes		201,942.5	100.0

1958 Illinois House of Representatives election
Party	Candidate	Votes	%
Democratic	Kenneth R. Wendt (incumbent)	48,059	31.29
Democratic	Frank Lyman	47,082.5	30.66
Republican	Albert W. Hachmeister (incumbent)	31,570	20.56
Republican	Johann S. Ackerman	26,872	17.50
Total votes		153,583.5	100.0

1956 Illinois House of Representatives election
Party	Candidate	Votes	%
Democratic	Kenneth R. Wendt	58,697	27.35
Republican	Albert W. Hachmeister	53,714.5	25.02
Democratic	Carl W. Stolteben	51,265	23.88
Republican	Harry D. Lavery	50,700	23.62
Total votes		214,646.5	100.0
