= Illinois's 9th House of Representatives district =

American legislative district

Illinois's 9th State House of Representatives district
Representative
Yolonda Morris; D–Chicago
since 2020
- Demographics: 29.7% White; 45.1% Black; 10.7% Hispanic; 11.0% Asian; 0.1% Native American; 0.0% Hawaiian/Pacific Islander; 0.5% Other; 2.8% Multiracial
- Population (2020): 120,173
- Created: 1983–present 1849–1873, 1957–1973

Illinois's 9th House of Representatives district is a Representative district within the Illinois House of Representatives located in Cook County, Illinois. It has been represented by Democrat Yolonda Morris since 2023. Before then it was Lakesia Collins since July 24, 2020. The district was previously represented by Democrat Art Turner from 2010 to 2020.

The district includes parts of the Chicago neighborhoods of East Garfield Park, Lincoln Park, Loop, Lower West Side, Near North Side, Near West Side, North Lawndale, South Lawndale, West Garfield Park, and West Town.

== Representative district history ==
Prior to the ratification of the 1848 Illinois Constitution, counties (or two or more counties) were designated a certain number of Senators and Representatives. With the ratification of the 1848 Illinois Constitution, Legislative and Representative districts were numbered and called by name. Each district was still assigned a certain number of Senators and Representatives. After the passage of the 1872 Apportionment, only Legislative districts were drawn with Representatives elected cumulatively. The 1954 amendment to the 1870 Illinois Constitution established Representative districts as separate from Legislative districts (with representatives still elected cumulatively). The boundaries of Representative and Legislative districts would differ. After the United States Supreme Court ruled in Reynolds v. Sims (1964) that "both houses of state legislatures must be apportioned according to districts of equal population," new districts were redrawn for the Illinois Senate and Illinois House of Representatives. While the Legislative districts were redrawn, the Governor and General Assembly failed to agree on Representative district boundaries. Under the 1954 amendment, "a 10-man bipartisan commission appointed by the governor from recommendations made by both parties" were directed to redraw boundaries but failed to do so in 1963. Because of this failure, and with no district boundaries redrawn, all Representative districts were temporarily merged into one at-large district with 177 representatives (the total number of representatives at the time). The 1964 Illinois House election had several candidates running for all 177 seats throughout the state. In 1965, the Representative districts were redrawn by the Illinois Legislative Reapportionment Commission and elections held in 1966 were done with separate districts. With the 1971 Apportionment (and adoption of the 1970 Illinois Constitution), Representative districts were abolished and representatives were once again elected cumulatively per Legislative district. After the passage of the Cutback Amendment in 1980, the number of Representatives was reduced from 177 to 118 with Representative districts re-established and now electing a single representative.

== Prominent representatives ==
Representative	Notes
Aaron Shaw	Elected to the U.S. House of Representatives from Illinois's 7th congressional district (1857 –1859); Elected back to the U.S. House of Representatives from Illinois's 16th congressional district (1883 – 1885)
Erastus Newton Bates	Elected the 15th Illinois Treasurer (1869 – 1873)
George Burditt	Republican nominee for the 1974 United States Senate election in Illinois

== List of representatives ==
=== 1849 – 1873 ===
Representative	Party	Years (Note: From 1870 to 1970, the GA met for a new session on the Wednesday after the first Monday of January.)	General Assembly (GA)	Electoral history	Counties represented
9th Representative district established with 1848 Illinois Constitution.
Ebenezer Z. Ryan	Whig	January 1, 1849 – January 6, 1851	16th	Elected in 1848; Was not re-elected in 1850.	Lawrence; Richland
Aaron Shaw	Democratic	January 6, 1851 – January 3, 1853	17th	Elected in 1850; Was not re-elected in 1852.	Lawrence; Richland
William Y. Christy	Whig	January 3, 1853 – January 1, 1855	18th	Elected in 1852; Was not re-elected in 1854.	Lawrence; Richland
Samuel H. Martin	O L Dem	January 1, 1855 – January 5, 1857	19th	Elected in 1854; Was not re-elected in 1856.	Wabash; White
John E. Whiting	Unknown	January 5, 1857 – January 3, 1859	20th	Elected in 1856; Was not re-elected in 1858.	Wabash; White
John G. Powell	Democratic	January 3, 1859 – January 7, 1861	21st	Elected in 1858; Was not re-elected in 1860.	Wabash; White
James M. Sharp	Unknown	January 7, 1861 – January 5, 1863	22nd	Elected in 1860; Was not re-elected in 1862.	Marion
John W. Merritt	Unknown	January 5, 1863 – January 2, 1865	23rd	Elected in 1862; Was not re-elected in 1864.	Marion
Samuel E. Stephenson	Democratic	January 2, 1865 – January 7, 1867	24th	Elected in 1864; Was not re-elected in 1866.	Marion
Erastus Newton Bates	Republican	January 7, 1867 – January 4, 1869	25th	Elected in 1866; Was not re-elected in 1868.	Marion
Thomas E. Merritt	Democratic	January 4, 1869 – January 4, 1871	26th	Elected in 1868; Redistricted to the 24th Representative district and re-elected in 1870.	Marion
William N. Ayres	Democratic	January 4, 1871 – January 8, 1873	27th	Elected in 1870; Was not re-elected in 1872.	Gallatin; Hardin
District abolished with 1872 Reapportionment as 3 Representatives were now elected cumulatively from Legislative districts.

=== 1957 – 1973 ===
Representative	Party	Party Control	Years (Note: Since 1970, the GA meets on the second Wednesday of January for a new session.)	General Assembly (GA)	Electoral history	Counties represented
District re-established in 1957.
William E. Pollack	Republican	2 Republicans; 1 Democrat	January 9, 1957 – January 6, 1965	70th 71st 72nd 73rd	Redistricted from the 6th Legislative district and re-elected in 1956; Re-elected in 1958; Re-elected in 1960; Re-elected in 1962; Ran in the At-large district election and won re-election in 1964.	Cook
Kenneth E. Moberley	Republican	2 Republicans; 1 Democrat	January 9, 1957 – January 7, 1959	70th	Elected in 1956; Lost re-election in 1958.	Cook
Joseph F. Fanta	Democratic	2 Republicans; 1 Democrat	January 9, 1957 – January 9, 1963	70th 71st 72nd	Elected in 1956; Re-elected in 1958; Re-elected in 1960; Lost re-election in 1962.	Cook
Nicholas Zagone	Democratic	2 Democrats; 1 Republican	January 7, 1959 – January 4, 1961	71st	Elected in 1958; Lost re-election in 1960.	Cook
Kenneth E. Moberley	Republican	2 Republicans; 1 Democrat	January 4, 1961 – January 6, 1965	72nd 73rd	Elected back in 1960; Re-elected in 1962; Retired.	Cook
Nicholas Zagone	Democratic	2 Republicans; 1 Democrat	January 9, 1963 – January 6, 1965	73rd	Elected back in 1962; Ran in the At-large district election and won re-election in 1964.	Cook
The district was temporarily abolished from 1965 to 1967 due to the Redistricting Commission in 1963 failing to reach an agreement. An at-large election was held electing 177 Representatives from across the state.
Don A. Moore	Republican	2 Republicans; 1 Democrat	January 4, 1967 – January 10, 1973	75th 76th 77th	Redistricted from At-large district and re-elected in 1966; Re-elected in 1968; Re-elected in 1970; Elected state Senator in the 9th Legislative District in 1972.	Cook
George M. Burditt	Republican	2 Republicans; 1 Democrat	January 4, 1967 – January 10, 1973	75th 76th 77th	Redistricted from At-large district and re-elected in 1966; Re-elected in 1968; Re-elected in 1970; Retired.	Cook
Leland Rayson	Democratic	2 Republicans; 1 Democrat	January 4, 1967 – January 10, 1973	75th 76th 77th	Redistricted from At-large district and re-elected in 1966; Re-elected in 1968; Re-elected in 1970; Redistricted to the 9th Legislative district and re-elected in 1972.	Cook
District abolished with 1971 Reapportionment as Representatives were once again elected from Legislative districts.

=== 1983 – Present ===
Representative	Party	Years	General Assembly (GA)	Electoral history	Counties represented
District re-established with representatives now elected one per district with the passage of the Cutback Amendment
Joseph Berrios	Democratic	January 12, 1983 – January 10, 1989	83rd 84th 85th	Elected in 1982; Re-elected in 1984; Re-elected in 1986; Elected Commissioner of the Cook County Board of Appeals in 1988.	Cook
Miguel A. Santiago	Democratic	January 10, 1989 – January 13, 1993	86th 87th	Elected in 1988; Re-elected in 1990; Redistricted to the 3rd Representative district and re-elected in 1992.	Cook
Arthur Turner	Democratic	January 13, 1993 – 2010	88th 89th 90th 91st 92nd 93rd 94th 95th	Redistricted from the 18th Representative district and re-elected in 1992; Re-elected in 1994; Re-elected in 1996; Re-elected in 1998; Re-elected in 2000; Re-elected in 2002; Re-elected in 2004; Re-elected in 2006; Re-elected in 2008; Lost the Democratic nomination for Lieutenant Governor in 2010 and later resigned his representative seat.	Cook
Arthur Turner	Democratic	January 13, 1993 – 2010	96th	Redistricted from the 18th Representative district and re-elected in 1992; Re-elected in 1994; Re-elected in 1996; Re-elected in 1998; Re-elected in 2000; Re-elected in 2002; Re-elected in 2004; Re-elected in 2006; Re-elected in 2008; Lost the Democratic nomination for Lieutenant Governor in 2010 and later resigned his representative seat.	Cook
Vacant		2010 – December 2010	96th		Cook
Art Turner	Democratic	December 2010 – July 3, 2020	96th 97th 98th 99th 100th	Elected in 2010 and appointed the same year Re-elected in 2012; Re-elected in 2014; Re-elected in 2016; Re-elected in 2018; Retired in 2020.	Cook
Art Turner	Democratic	December 2010 – July 3, 2020	101st	Elected in 2010 and appointed the same year Re-elected in 2012; Re-elected in 2014; Re-elected in 2016; Re-elected in 2018; Retired in 2020.	Cook
Vacant		July 3, 2020 – July 24, 2020	101st		Cook
Yolonda Morris		September 12, 2023 – present	103rd		Cook
Lakesia Collins	Democratic	July 24, 2020 – present	101st 102nd 103rd	Appointed and subsequently elected in 2020; Re-elected in 2022	Cook

== Historic District Boundaries ==
Years	County	Municipalities/Townships	Notes
2013 – present	Cook	Chicago (East Garfield Park, Lincoln Park, Loop, Lower West Side, Near North Side, Near West Side, North Lawndale, South Lawndale, West Garfield Park, West Town)	
2003 – 2013	Cook	Chicago	
1993 – 2003	Cook	Chicago	
1983 – 1993	Cook	Chicago	
1967 – 1973	Cook	Bremen Township, Lemont Township, parts of Lyons Township, Orland Township, Palos Township, parts of Thornton Township	
1957 – 1965	Cook	Chicago	
1871 – 1873	Gallatin; Hardin	Bowlesville, Buffalo, Cave-In-Rock, Christmasville, Cottonwood, Cypress, Elizabethtown, Equality, New Market, Rock Ferry, Rosiclare, Salineville, Shawneetown (Old Shawneetown), South Hampton, Sparks Hill	
1863 – 1871	Marion	Alma, Centralia, Fosterburg, Fosters, Fredericktown, Hickory Hill, Junction City (Junction), Kinmundy, Middleton, Mt. Xian, Odin, Patoka, Raccoon, Salem, Sandoval, Tonti, Walnut Hill	
1855 – 1863	Wabash; White	Armstrong, Burnt Prairie, Carmi, Concord, Duncanton, Emma, Enfield, Friendsville, Grayville, Junto, Liberty (Burnt Prairie), Mier, Mount Carmel, Phillipstown, Poland, Rochester Mill (Rochester), Sacramento, Shealsville, Tecumseh	
1849 – 1855	Lawrence; Richland	C.H., Eden, Lawrenceville, Matthew's Mills, Noble, Olney, Parkersburg, Ruark, Russellville, St. Francisville, Smallsburg, Stringtown	

== Electoral history ==
=== 2030 – 2022 ===
2022 Illinois House of Representatives election
Party	Candidate	Votes	%
Democratic	Lakesia Collins (incumbent)	20,413	100.0
Total votes		20,413	100.0

=== 2020 – 2012 ===
2020 Illinois House of Representatives election
Party	Candidate	Votes	%
Democratic	Lakesia Collins (incumbent)	38,252	100.0
Total votes		38,252	100.0

2018 Illinois House of Representatives election
Party	Candidate	Votes	%
Democratic	Arthur Turner (incumbent)	30,951	100.0
Total votes		30,951	100.0

2016 Illinois House of Representatives election
Party	Candidate	Votes	%
Democratic	Arthur Turner (incumbent)	36,765	100.0
Total votes		36,765	100.0

2014 Illinois House of Representatives election
Party	Candidate	Votes	%
Democratic	Arthur Turner (incumbent)	20,890	100.0
Total votes		20,890	100.0

2012 Illinois House of Representatives election
Party	Candidate	Votes	%
Democratic	Arthur Turner (incumbent)	33,967	100.0
Total votes		33,967	100.0

=== 2010 – 2002 ===
2010 Illinois House of Representatives election
Party	Candidate	Votes	%
Democratic	Arthur Turner	21,900	100.0
Total votes		21,900	100.0

2008 Illinois House of Representatives election
Party	Candidate	Votes	%	±%
Democratic	Arthur L. Turner (incumbent)	36,203	100.0	+10.69%
Total votes		36,203	100.0	

2006 Illinois House of Representatives election
Party	Candidate	Votes	%	±%
Democratic	Arthur L. Turner (incumbent)	20,122	89.31	−10.69%
Republican	Myra Bland	2,408	10.69	N/A
Total votes		22,530	100.0	

2004 Illinois House of Representatives election
Party	Candidate	Votes	%	±%
Democratic	Arthur L. Turner (incumbent)	32,405	100.0	+7.19%
Total votes		32,405	100.0	

2002 Illinois House of Representatives election
Party	Candidate	Votes	%	±%
Democratic	Arthur L. Turner (incumbent)	18,823	92.81	−7.19%
Libertarian	John Kasner	1,458	7.19	N/A
Total votes		20,281	100.0	

=== 2000 – 1992 ===
2000 Illinois House of Representatives election
Party	Candidate	Votes	%
Democratic	Arthur L. Turner (incumbent)	24,044	100.0
Total votes		24,044	100.0

1998 Illinois House of Representatives election
Party	Candidate	Votes	%	±%
Democratic	Arthur L. Turner (incumbent)	18,256	100.0	+5.73%
Total votes		18,256	100.0	

1996 Illinois House of Representatives election
Party	Candidate	Votes	%	±%
Democratic	Arthur L. Turner (incumbent)	22,444	94.27	+3.40%
Republican	Marie Ciffone	1,365	5.73	−3.40%
Total votes		23,809	100.0	

1994 Illinois House of Representatives election
Party	Candidate	Votes	%	±%
Democratic	Arthur L. Turner (incumbent)	13,021	90.87	−9.13%
Republican	Eileen M. Zelazny	1,309	9.13	N/A
Total votes		14,330	100.0	

1992 Illinois House of Representatives election
Party	Candidate	Votes	%
Democratic	Arthur L. Turner	27,969	100.0
Total votes		27,969	100.0

=== 1990 – 1982 ===
1990 Illinois House of Representatives election
Party	Candidate	Votes	%
Democratic	Miguel A. Santiago (incumbent)	9,658	100.0
Total votes		9,658	100.0

1988 Illinois House of Representatives election
Party	Candidate	Votes	%
Democratic	Miguel A. Santiago	16,953	100.0
Total votes		16,953	100.0

1986 Illinois House of Representatives election
Party	Candidate	Votes	%
Democratic	Joseph Berrios (incumbent)	12,146	100.0
Total votes		12,146	100.0

1984 Illinois House of Representatives election
Party	Candidate	Votes	%
Democratic	Joseph Berrios (incumbent)	16,441	100.0
Total votes		16,441	100.0

1982 Illinois House of Representatives election
Party	Candidate	Votes	%
Democratic	Joseph Berrios	20,560	100.0
Total votes		20,560	100.0

=== 1970 – 1962 ===
1970 Illinois House of Representatives election
Party	Candidate	Votes	%
Republican	Don A. Moore (incumbent)	64,805	39.47
Democratic	Leland H. Rayson (incumbent)	56,482.5	34.40
Republican	George M. Burditt (incumbent)	49,992	30.45
Democratic	Gerald A. Brier	37,924	23.10
Total votes		164,203.5	100.0

1968 Illinois House of Representatives election
Party	Candidate	Votes	%
Republican	Don A. Moore (incumbent)	90,889	33.19
Republican	George M. Burditt (incumbent)	71,237.5	26.01
Democratic	Leland H. Rayson (incumbent)	61,417	22.43
Democratic	Richard F. Kelly, Jr.	50,310	18.37
Total votes		273,853.5	100.0

1966 Illinois House of Representatives election
Party	Candidate	Votes	%
Republican	Don A. Moore	70,057	33.24
Republican	George M. Burditt	60,885.5	28.89
Democratic	Leland H. Rayson	44,032	20.89
Democratic	Richey V. Graham, Jr.	35,769.5	16.97
Total votes		210,744	100.0

1962 Illinois House of Representatives election
Party	Candidate	Votes	%
Republican	William E. Pollack (incumbent)	43,063	28.21
Republican	Kenneth E. Moberley (incumbent)	38,898.5	25.48
Democratic	Nicholas Zagone	36,108.5	23.65
Democratic	Joseph F. Fanta (incumbent)	34,600.5	22.66
Total votes		152,670.5	100.0

=== 1960 – 1956 ===
1960 Illinois House of Representatives election
Party	Candidate	Votes	%
Republican	William E. Pollack (incumbent)	53,126	26.88
Republican	Kenneth E. Moberley	49,295.5	24.94
Democratic	Joseph F. Fanta (incumbent)	48,158.5	24.37
Democratic	Nicholas Zagone (incumbent)	47,053.5	23.81
Total votes		197,633.5	100.0

1958 Illinois House of Representatives election
Party	Candidate	Votes	%
Democratic	Joseph F. Fanta (incumbent)	45,638.5	29.80
Democratic	Nicholas Zagone	40,120	26.20
Republican	William E. Pollack (incumbent)	35,321	23.07
Republican	Kenneth E. Moberley (incumbent)	32,050.5	20.93
Total votes		153,130	100.0

1956 Illinois House of Representatives election
Party	Candidate	Votes	%
Republican	William E. Pollack	60,410	28.99
Republican	Kenneth E. Moberley	57,453.5	27.57
Democratic	Joseph F. Fanta	48,543	23.30
Democratic	Archie F. McKnight	41,692.5	20.01
Total votes		208,369	100.0
