= Pamela Harris =

Pamela Harris may refer to:

- Pamela Harris (artist) (1946–1992), Australian artist in the Progressive Art Movement
- Pamela Harris (judge) (born 1962), American federal judge
- Pamela Harris (photographer) (born 1940), American photographer
- Pamela Harris (politician), assemblywoman from New York
- Pamela E. Harris (born 1983), Mexican-American mathematician and educator
- Pamela Reaves-Harris, American lawyer and politician
- Agent Pamela Harris, fictional CIA agent in the 2016 film Central Intelligence
