= 2010 Illinois gubernatorial election =

- November 2, 2010
- Turnout: 49.69% ▲2.40 pp
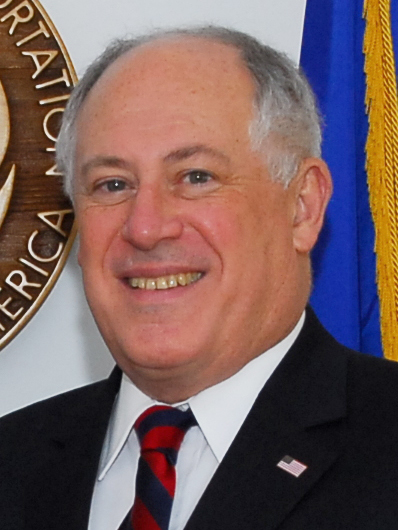

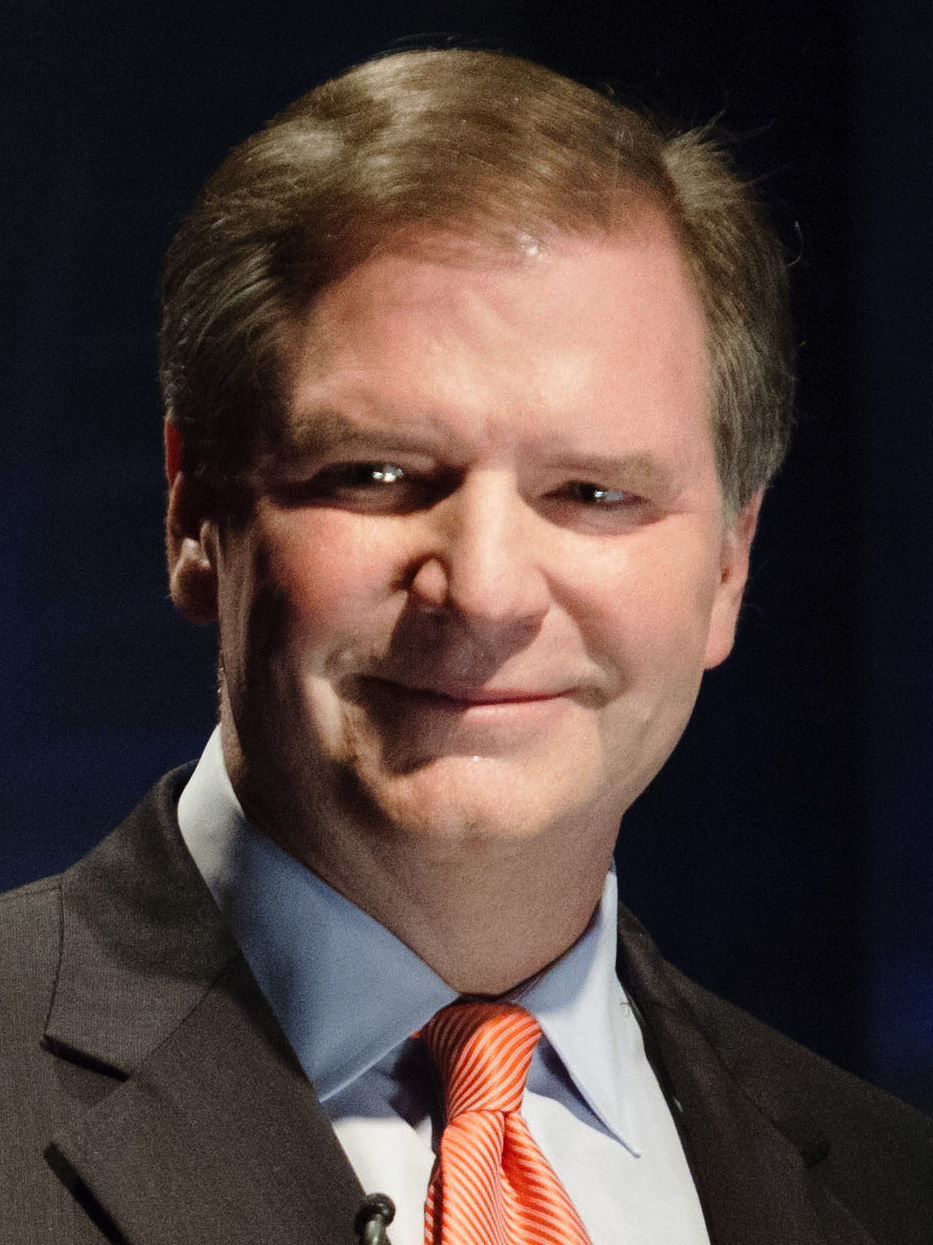
| Nominee | Pat Quinn | Bill Brady |
| Party | Democratic | Republican |
| Running mate | Sheila Simon | Jason Plummer |
| Popular vote | 1,745,219 | 1,713,385 |
| Percentage | 46.79% | 45.94% |
- County results Quinn: 40–50% 60–70% Brady: 40–50% 50–60% 60–70% 70–80%
Governor before election
Pat Quinn
Democratic
Elected Governor
Pat Quinn
Democratic

The 2010 Illinois gubernatorial election took place on November 2, 2010. Incumbent Democratic Governor Pat Quinn was elected to a full term in office, having become governor in 2009 following the impeachment and removal of Governor Rod Blagojevich. Quinn was elected as the Democratic nominee, the Illinois Green Party nominee was attorney and 2006 nominee Rich Whitney, the Republican nominee was State Senator Bill Brady, the Libertarian Party nominee was Lex Green, and Scott Lee Cohen ran as an independent.

Quinn was elected to a full term in a very close race, defeating Brady by only about 32,000 votes with Brady carrying 98 of the state's 102 counties. Prior to the general election, the primary election in February 2010 featured extremely close races between candidates for the two largest parties' nominations. Quinn warded off a challenge by Comptroller Dan Hynes by a margin of about 8,300 votes, while Brady won the Republican nomination on the strength of fewer than 200 votes in a fractured seven-way race. This was the first time Gallatin County went Republican at the gubernatorial level since 1920. The election marked the first time since 1852 that the Democrats won three consecutive gubernatorial elections in Illinois. This is also the first gubernatorial election since 1990 in which the winner was of the same party as the incumbent president.

== Background ==
The primaries and general elections coincided with those for federal elections (Senate and House), as well as those for other state offices. The election was part of the 2010 Illinois elections.

For the primaries, turnout for the gubernatorial primaries was 22.21%, with 1,688,297 votes cast and turnout for the lieutenant gubernatorial primaries was 20.10% with 1,527,782 votes cast. For the general election, turnout was 49.69%, with 3,729,989 votes cast.

== Democratic primary ==
Quinn defeated Hynes by just under 9,000 votes, while Cohen won an upset over establishment candidates by just over 3% campaigning as a political outsider.

=== Governor ===
==== Candidates ====
- Daniel Hynes, Illinois state comptroller and candidate for the U.S. Senate in 2004
- Pat Quinn, incumbent governor

==== Debates ====
Democratic candidates Quinn and Hynes debated on January 19. WSIU Public Broadcasting (WSIU (FM)/WSIU-TV) at Southern Illinois University and Illinois Public Media (WILL AM/FM/TV) at the University of Illinois at Urbana-Champaign also co-sponsored two gubernatorial primary election debates. Pat Quinn and Dan Hynes debated on January 21, 2010.

==== Polling ====
| Poll source | Dates administered | Pat Quinn | Lisa Madigan | Dan Hynes | Undecided |
|---|---|---|---|---|---|
| Public Policy Polling | January 26, 2010 | 40% | – | 41% | 19% |
| Chicago Tribune | January 16–20, 2010 | 44% | – | 40% | 15% |
| Chicago Tribune | December 2–8, 2009 | 49% | – | 23% | 23% |
| Simon Public Policy | October 16, 2009 | 33.9% | – | 16.5% | 35.4% |
| Public Policy Polling | April 24–26, 2009 | 29% | 45% | – | 26% |

==== Results ====
County results

Democratic gubernatorial primary results
| Party | Candidate | Votes | % |
|---|---|---|---|
| Democratic | Pat Quinn (incumbent) | 462,049 | 50.46 |
| Democratic | Daniel Hynes | 453,677 | 49.54 |
| Total votes | | 915,726 | 100.00 |

=== Lieutenant governor ===
==== Candidates ====
- Mike Boland, member of the Illinois House of Representatives
- Thomas Michael Castillo
- Scott Lee Cohen, pawnbroker
- Rickey R. Hendon, Illinois state senator
- Terry Link, Illinois state senator
- Arthur Turner, member of the Illinois House of Representatives

==== Results ====
Primary results by county: Cohen: Cohen—41-50%; Cohen—31-40%; Cohen—21-30%; Turner: Turner—21-30%; Boland: Boland—61-70%; Boland—51-60%; Boland—41-50%; Boland—31-40%; Boland—21-30%; Castillo: Castillo—31-40%; Castillo—21-30%; Link: Link-41-50%; Link-31-40%; Link-21-30%; Tie: Tie between Cohen and Boland-27%

Democratic lieutenant gubernatorial primary results
| Party | Candidate | Votes | % |
|---|---|---|---|
| Democratic | Scott Lee Cohen | 213,475 | 25.97 |
| Democratic | Arthur Turner | 183,208 | 22.29 |
| Democratic | Rickey R. Hendon | 113,690 | 13.83 |
| Democratic | Mike Boland | 105,867 | 12.88 |
| Democratic | Thomas Michael Castillo | 105,383 | 12.82 |
| Democratic | Terry Link | 100,335 | 12.21 |
| Total votes | | 821,958 | 100.00 |

==== Aftermath ====
Scott Lee Cohen was replaced as the Democratic lieutenant gubernatorial nominee by former Carbondale City Councilwoman Sheila Simon after he withdrew due to allegations of abuse toward his wife and other charges.

== Republican primary ==
As on the Democratic side, both the gubernatorial and lieutenant gubernatorial primaries were extremely close, though more so. Brady defeated Dillard by 0.02%, while Plummer defeated Murphy by just 0.65%.

=== Governor ===
==== Candidates ====
===== Declared =====
- Adam Andrzejewski, businessman
- Bill Brady, state senator and candidate for governor in 2006
- Kirk Dillard, state senator
- Andy McKenna, businessman, former chairman of the Republican Party of Illinois and candidate for the U.S. Senate in 2004
- Dan Proft, political commentator
- Jim Ryan, former attorney general of Illinois and nominee for governor in 2002

===== Withdrew =====
- Bob Schillerstrom, chairman of the DuPage County Board

==== Results ====
County results

Republican gubernatorial primary results
| Party | Candidate | Votes | % |
|---|---|---|---|
| Republican | Bill Brady | 155,527 | 20.26 |
| Republican | Kirk Dillard | 155,334 | 20.24 |
| Republican | Andy McKenna | 148,054 | 19.29 |
| Republican | Jim Ryan | 130,785 | 17.04 |
| Republican | Adam Andrzejewski | 111,030 | 14.47 |
| Republican | Dan Proft | 59,335 | 7.73 |
| Republican | Bob Schillerstrom | 7,420 | 0.97 |
| Total votes | | 767,485 | 100.00 |

=== Lieutenant governor ===
==== Candidates ====
- Brad Cole, mayor of Carbondale
- Dennis W. Cook, president of Consolidated District 230 Board of Education
- Matt Murphy, Illinois Ssate senator
- Jason Plummer, chairman of the Madison County Republican Party
- Don Tracy, corporate attorney
- Randy A. White Sr., Hancock County commissioner

==== Withdrawn ====
- Dave Winters, Illinois state representative

==== Results ====
Plummer: 20–30%; 30–40%; 40–50%; 50–60%; 60–70%; Murphy: 30–40%; 40–50%; 50–60%; Tracy: 20–30%; 30–40%; 40–50%; 50–60%; 60–70%; 80–90%; Cole: 30–40%; 40–50%; 50–60%; White: 30–40%

Republican lieutenant gubernatorial primary results
| Party | Candidate | Votes | % |
|---|---|---|---|
| Republican | Jason Plummer | 238,169 | 33.98 |
| Republican | Matt Murphy | 233,572 | 33.33 |
| Republican | Don Tracy | 80,116 | 11.43 |
| Republican | Brad Cole | 61,317 | 8.75 |
| Republican | Dennis W. Cook | 55,339 | 7.90 |
| Republican | Randy A. White Sr. | 32,343 | 4.61 |
| Total votes | | 700,856 | 100.00 |

== Green primary ==
=== Governor ===
==== Candidates ====
- Rich Whitney, nominee for governor in 2006

==== Results ====
Green Party primary results
| Party | Candidate | Votes | % |
|---|---|---|---|
| Green | Rich Whitney | 5,086 | 100.00 |
| Total votes | | 5,086 | 100.00 |

=== Lieutenant governor ===
==== Candidates ====
- Don Crawford

==== Results ====
Green lieutenant gubernatorial primary results
| Party | Candidate | Votes | % |
|---|---|---|---|
| Green | Don W. Crawford | 4,968 | 33.98 |
| Total votes | | 4,968 | 100.00 |

== General election ==
=== Candidates ===
- Pat Quinn (Democratic) (campaign website): Incumbent governor who assumed office after the impeachment of Rod Blagojevich; sought a full term in 2010. Quinn was previously revenue director for the City of Chicago, state treasurer (1990–1994), and an unsuccessful candidate for the Democratic nomination for U.S. Ssnator (1996), Illinois secretary of state (1994), and lieutenant governor (1998).
- Bill Brady (Republican) (campaign website): state senator, real estate and construction businessman, unsuccessful candidate for the Republican nomination for governor in 2006
- Rich Whitney (Green): Illinois Green Party's 2006 nominee for governor
- Lex Green (Libertarian) (archived campaign website): secretary of the McLean County Libertarian Party
- Scott Lee Cohen (Independent): former Democratic nominee for lieutenant governor in 2010 who was replaced by Sheila Simon after withdrawing due to allegations of abuse toward his wife and other charges. Cohen was reported to have been in a private meeting with Speaker Michael Madigan discussing his plan for running against Quinn.

=== Campaign ===
After the February 2 Democratic primary in which incumbent Governor Pat Quinn was nominated, attention was drawn to Scott Lee Cohen, the Democratic nominee for lieutenant governor. Illinois law required that candidates for governor and lieutenant governor run in separate primary elections, but run as a ticket in the November general election. Cohen was criticized for his having been charged with domestic battery, in which he was accused of holding a knife to the throat of an ex-girlfriend who was also a convicted prostitute. Cohen was also accused by his ex-wife of physical abuse and using illegally obtained anabolic steroids. Quinn and Dick Durbin, Illinois's senior U.S. Senator, both said that Cohen should withdraw his candidacy, which he did on February 7. Cohen ran as an independent candidate for the office of governor against Quinn.

On March 27, 2010, the Democratic State Central Committee chose a replacement candidate, Sheila Simon. Dan Hynes, who placed second in the gubernatorial primary, denied interest in replacing Cohen on the ticket. Other names suggested included State Representative Art Turner, who placed second to Cohen in the Democratic primary and then finished second to Simon in committee balloting on March 27, 2010; State Senators Rickey Hendon and Terry Link, State Representative Mike Boland, and electrician Thomas Castillo, all of whom also ran in the primary; U.S. Department of Veterans Affairs official Tammy Duckworth; and State Representative Julie Hamos were suggested as possible replacements. Jeff Melvin, a 21-year retired Army veteran, also applied to the open nominating call for the Democratic lieutenant governor position.

At one point during the campaign, Quinn, struggling to make up ground amidst poor polling numbers against Brady, accused his Republican opponent of supporting a bill to kill puppies. In fact, the bill regulated shelters' practices when they euthanize animals. Quinn struggled to shake off Blagojevich's scandals, leading to poor approval ratings throughout the campaign, despite Quinn denouncing Blagojevich. Quinn trailed Brady by more than 10 points at times, despite Illinois being a deeply Democratic state.

A central issue in the campaign was the state income tax. Quinn advocated for a one percentage point – or 33 percent – increase in the state's income tax to primarily fund education, while Brady called for a 10 percent across the board cut in state government and placing the State Board of Education under the governor's control.

=== Predictions ===
| Source | Ranking | As of |
|---|---|---|
| Cook Political Report | Tossup | October 14, 2010 |
| Rothenberg | Tilt R (flip) | October 28, 2010 |
| RealClearPolitics | Tossup | November 1, 2010 |
| Sabato's Crystal Ball | Lean R (flip) | October 28, 2010 |
| CQ Politics | Lean D | October 28, 2010 |

=== Polling ===
| Poll source | Dates administered | Sample size | Margin of error | Pat Quinn (D) | Bill Brady (R) | Rich Whitney (G) | Other | Unde- cided |
|---|---|---|---|---|---|---|---|---|
| Fox News () | October 23, 2010 | 1,000 | ± 3.0% | 39% | 44% | 4% | 7% | 6% |
| Chicago Tribune () | October 18–22, 2010 | 700 | ± 3.7% | 39% | 43% | 4% | 7% | 6% |
| Rasmussen Reports () | October 20, 2010 | 750 | ± 4.0% | 37% | 45% | 2% | 7% | 8% |
| Rasmussen Reports (report) | October 12, 2010 | 750 | ± 4.5% | 40% | 46% | 2% | 9% | 3% |
| Southern Illinois University () | September 30 – October 10, 2010 | — | ± 3.5% | 29.8% | 38.4% | 2.2% | 5.9% | - |
| Rasmussen Reports (report) | October 4, 2010 | 500 | ± 4.5% | 38% | 46% | 4% | 5% | 8% |
| Suffolk University (report) | September 30 – October 3, 2010 | 500 | ±4.4% | 43% | 37% | 3% | 8% | 8% |
| (Public Policy Polling) | September 30, 2010 | 470 | ±4.5% | 35% | 42% | 4% | 8% | 11% |
| Chicago Tribune (report) | September 24–28, 2010 | 600 | ±4% | 39% | 38% | 3% | 8% | 12% |
| CNN/TIME (report) | September 24–28, 2010 | 1,504 | ±2.5% | 38% | 40% | 4% | 16% | 2% |
| We Ask America | September 13, 2010 | 1,050 | ±2.70% | 32% | 42% | 4% | – | 16% |
| Rasmussen Reports (report) | September 12, 2010 | 750 | ±4.0% | 37% | 50% | 4% | 7% | 3% |
| Chicago Tribune (report) | Aug. 28 – Sept. 1, 2010 | 600 | ±4.0% | 32% | 37% | 2% | – | 19% |
| Rasmussen Reports (report) | August 23, 2010 | 750 | ±4.0% | 37% | 46% | – | 6% | 11% |
| Public Policy Polling (report) | August 14–15, 2010 | 576 | ±4.1% | 30% | 39% | 11% | – | 6% |
| Rasmussen Reports (report) | August 9, 2010 | 750 | ±4.0% | 35% | 48% | – | 6% | 12% |
| Rasmussen Reports (report) | July 27, 2010 | 750 | ±4.0% | 37% | 44% | – | 11% | 9% |
| Rasmussen Reports (report) | July 7, 2010 | 500 | ±4.5% | 40% | 43% | – | 9% | 8% |
| Public Policy Polling (report) | June 12–13, 2010 | 552 | ±4.2% | 30% | 34% | 9% | – | 27% |
| Rasmussen Reports (report) | June 7, 2010 | 500 | ±4.5% | 36% | 47% | – | 8% | 10% |
| Research 2000 (report) | May 3–5, 2010 | 600 | ±4.0% | 36% | 39% | – | – | 25% |
| We Ask America () | May 2, 2010 | 1,050 | ±3.02% | 31.15% | 46.25% | 4.81% | – | 17.79% |
| Rasmussen Reports (report) | April 28, 2010 | 500 | ± 4.5% | 38% | 45% | – | 5% | 11% |
| Rasmussen Reports () | April 8, 2010 | 500 | ± 4.5% | 38% | 45% | – | 7% | 10% |
| Public Policy Polling (report) | April 5, 2010 | 591 | ± 4.0% | 33% | 43% | – | – | 24% |
| We Ask America | March 10, 2010 | 798 | 3.5% | 31.58% | 44.61% | 3.51% | – | 20.30% |
| Rasmussen Reports (report) | March 8, 2010 | 500 | ± 4.5% | 37% | 47% | – | 6% | 9% |
| Research 2000 (report) | February 22 –24, 2010 | 600 | ± 4.0% | 47% | 32% | – | 1% | 20% |
| The Illinois Poll () | February 7, 2010 | 1,200 | ± 2.8% | 42% | 31% | – | 4% | 23% |
| Rasmussen Reports (report) | December 14, 2009 | 500 | ± 4.5% | 45% | 30% | – | 13% | 13% |

=== Results ===
Even though Brady won 98 out of the 102 counties, Quinn narrowly prevailed. Brady won almost everywhere in the state, including all of the collar counties of the Chicago suburbs. Quinn initially had a large lead when results first began to come in, as heavily populated areas tend to report their votes faster. However, once the more suburban and rural areas came in Brady narrowed the gap significantly. Quinn's huge win in Cook County proved too much for Brady to overcome, however. Brady conceded defeat later the following day on November 3, when it became clear he would lose. Quinn's win was ranked by Politico as the 7th biggest upset of the 2010 elections.

2010 Illinois gubernatorial election
| Party | Candidate | Votes | % | ±% |
|---|---|---|---|---|
| Democratic | Pat Quinn (incumbent)/Sheila Simon | 1,745,219 | 46.79% | −3.00% |
| Republican | Bill Brady/Jason Plummer | 1,713,385 | 45.94% | +6.68% |
| Independent | Scott Lee Cohen | 135,705 | 3.64% | n/a |
| Green | Rich Whitney/Donald Crawford | 100,756 | 2.70% | −7.66% |
| Libertarian | Lex Green | 34,681 | 0.93% | n/a |
| Total votes | | 3,729,746 | 100.00% | n/a |
| Democratic hold | | | | |

==== Counties that flipped from Democratic to Republican ====
- Hamilton (largest city: McLeansboro)
- Pope (largest city: Golconda)
- Randolph (largest city: Chester)
- Saline (largest city: Harrisburg)
- Will (largest city: Joliet)
- Williamson (largest city: Marion)
- Winnebago (largest city: Rockford)
- Franklin (largest city: West Frankfort)
- LaSalle (largest city: Ottawa)
- Boone (largest city: Belvidere)
- Madison (largest city: Granite City)
- Mercer (largest city: Aledo)
- Monroe (largest city: Waterloo)
- Calhoun (largest village: Hardin)
- Fulton (largest city: Canton)
- Henderson (largest village: Oquawka)
- Knox (largest city: Galesburg)
- Pulaski (largest city: Mounds)
- Rock Island (largest city: Moline)
- Lake (largest city: Waukegan)
- Whiteside (largest city: Sterling)
- Perry (largest city: Du Quoin)
- Union (largest city: Anna)
- Jersey (largest city: Jerseyville)
- Hardin (largest city: Rosiclare)
- Massac (largest city: Metropolis)
- Gallatin (largest city: Shawneetown)
- Putnam (largest city: Hennpin)

==== Counties that flipped from Republican to Democratic ====
- Jackson (largest city: Carbondale)

== See also ==
- Rod Blagojevich corruption charges
- 2010 United States Senate elections in Illinois
- 2010 United States House of Representatives elections in Illinois
