= Patricia Van Pelt =

American politician

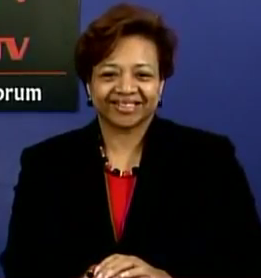
- Van Pelt in 2013

Member of the Illinois Senate from the 5th district
- In office January 9, 2013 – August 1, 2023
- Preceded by: Annazette Collins
- Succeeded by: Lakesia Collins

Personal details
- Born: November 12, 1957 (age 68) Chicago, Illinois, U.S.
- Party: Democratic
- Education: Truman College; Roosevelt University (BS); Spertus Institute (MS); Capella University (PhD)

Patricia Van Pelt Watkins (born November 20, 1957) is an American politician who served in the Illinois Senate, representing the 5th district, from 2013 to 2023. The 5th district is located on the West Side of Chicago. Prior to her service as a member of the Illinois Senate she was a community activist and ran for Mayor of Chicago.

== Early life and career ==
Van Pelt was born on the Near North Side and raised in the Cabrini–Green public housing. Inspired by her mother's ability to work, raise her children and go to school, she took a job as a steelworker while taking classes at Truman College. She earned a bachelor's in public administration and became a CPA after taking accounting classes at DePaul University.

Using her life experience and education, she founded Target Development Corp, which worked to improve communities. This including teaching residents how to peacefully evict drug dealers from their neighborhoods. In 2009, she earned a doctorate in nonprofit management from Capella University.

== Chicago mayoral election, 2011 ==
In 2010, Van Pelt announced that she was going to run for mayor in order to bring ideas to the forefront that had been forgotten about. During the campaign, she was accused of "being strung out on crack for twenty years," by candidate and former US Senator Carol Moseley Braun, which Watkins credits to her future political success. She finished fifth on election day.

After the election, Van Pelt was appointed by the Illinois State Board of Education to the State Charter School Commission for a term ending November 1, 2013. The State Charter School Commission authorizes charter schools throughout the State, particularly schools designed to expand opportunities for at-risk students.

== Illinois State Senator ==
=== 2012 Senate election ===
In 2011, Van Pelt announced that she would challenge Annazette Collins for the Illinois Senate's 5th district. During the primary election she was endorsed by several aldermen from the fifth district, and the Chicago Journal.

Aldermanic endorsements included Walter Burnett and Bob Fioretti. Fioretti stated that "Her integrity is beyond reproach. She will roll her sleeves up and research the issues and make the right decisions for all the people. She won't be beholden to the special interests that control Springfield right now." She was also endorsed by Illinois Secretary of State Jesse White, who previously supported Collins, after Collins's corruption came to the forefront. Van Pelt beat Collins by a 54%-46% margin.

=== Tenure ===
Van Pelt was sworn in on January 9, 2013.

=== Retirement ===
Despite winning election to a four-year term in the 2022 election, Van Pelt announced her retirement on July 26, 2023. Illinois State Representative Lakesia Collins was appointed to succeed her.
