= Yolonda Morris =

American politician from Illinois

Member of the Illinois House of Representatives from the 9th district
- Incumbent
- Assumed office September 12, 2023
- Preceded by: Lakesia Collins

Personal details
- Party: Democratic

Yolonda Morris is an American healthcare professional and politician serving as a member of the Illinois House of Representatives for the 9th district, having first been appointed to the seat in 2023. Before entering the House, she worked as a nursing assistant and an organizer with the Service Employees International Union. Morris introduced a bill in 2026 to improve healthcare access and workplace protections for people experiencing menopause.

== Career ==
Morris has worked as a nursing assistant and an organiser with the Service Employees International Union. She worked in the healthcare industry for over two decades before becoming a state legislator.

Morris was first appointed to the Illinois House of Representatives in 2023 to replace fellow Democrat Lakesia Collins. She was reelected unopposed in 2024.

In 2026, Morris introduced a bill called the Illinois Menopause Equity and Care Act to improve workplace protections and healthcare access for people experiencing menopause, as well as requiring the Illinois Department of Public Health to create educational materials about menopause symptoms and treatment options. Morris experienced a hot flash while introducing the bill in committee. The bill passed the House with bipartisan support in April 2026. Also in 2026, she sponsored a bill to allow rideshare drivers within the state to unionize.

Morris has referred to herself as a "strong advocate for equitable housing access" and condemned discrimination by landlords against low-income tenants. She supports banning hidden move-in fees to "rein in" the cost of housing and make it more affordable.
