= Jawaharial Williams =

Politician in Illinois

Omar Williams

Member of the Illinois House of Representatives from the 10th district
- Incumbent
- Assumed office May 1, 2019
- Preceded by: Melissa Conyears

Personal details
- Born: March 13, 1975 (age 51)
- Party: Democratic
- Relatives: Walter Burnett Jr. (stepfather)
- Education: Northeastern Illinois University (BA)

Jawaharial "Omar" Williams (born March 13, 1975) is a Democratic member of the Illinois House of Representatives for the 10th district. The district includes parts of the Chicago neighborhoods of Austin, East Garfield Park, Humboldt Park, Lincoln Park, Logan Square, Near North Side, Near West Side, West Garfield Park, and West Town.

Williams was appointed in May 2019 to replace outgoing representative Melissa Conyears-Ervin after her election to the post of City Treasurer of Chicago.

Before his appointment as state representative, Williams was a laborer in the Chicago Department of Water Management, a member of the Laborers' International Union of North America and Plumbers Local 130 UA, former president of the Young Democrats of Illinois, and a community volunteer. He is a member of Kappa Alpha Psi fraternity.

Williams is the step-son of Chicago Alderman Walter Burnett Jr.

As of July 3, 2022, Representative Williams is a member of the following Illinois House committees:

- Financial Institutions Committee (HFIN)
- Labor & Commerce Committee (HLBR)
- Public Utilities Committee (HPUB)
- Transportation: Regulation, Roads & Bridges Committee (HTRR)
- Transportation: Vehicles & Safety Committee (HVES)
- Utilities Subcommittee (HPUB-UTIL)

== Electoral history ==
Illinois 10th Representative District Democratic Primary, 2020
Party	Candidate	Votes	%
Democratic	Jawaharial "Omar" Williams (incumbent)	8,334	45.19
Democratic	Gerard C. Moorer	5,872	31.84
Democratic	Gina Zuccaro	4,237	22.97
Total votes		18,443	100.0

Illinois 10th Representative District General Election, 2020
Party	Candidate	Votes	%
Democratic	Jawaharial "Omar" Williams (incumbent)	38,256	100.0
Total votes		38,256	100.0

Illinois 10th Representative District General Election, 2022
Party	Candidate	Votes	%
Democratic	Jawaharial "Omar" Williams (incumbent)	24,344	100.0
Total votes		24,344	100.0
