= Lakesia Collins =

American union organizer and politician (born 1985)

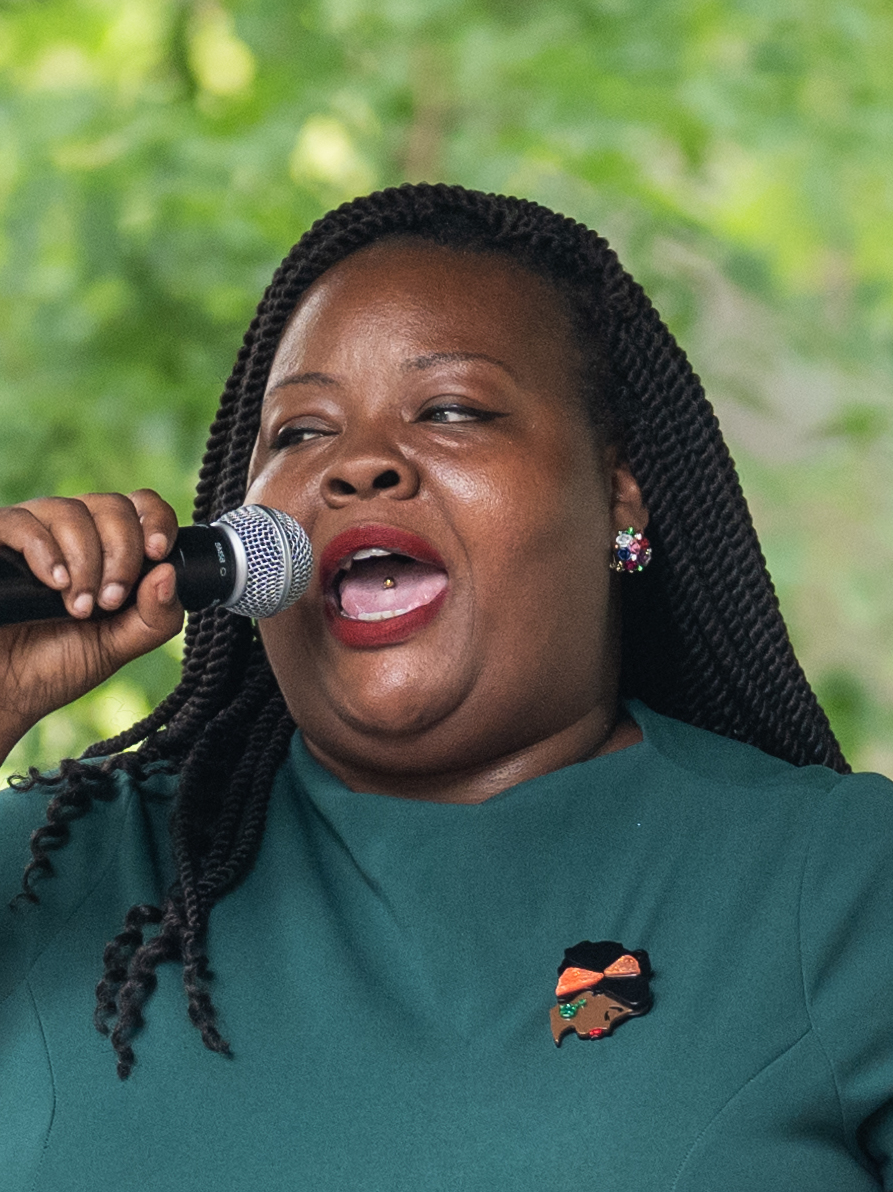
- Collins in 2025

Member of the Illinois Senate from the 5th district
- Incumbent
- Assumed office August 16, 2023
- Preceded by: Patricia Van Pelt

Member of the Illinois House of Representatives from the 9th district
- In office July 24, 2020 – August 16, 2023
- Preceded by: Art Turner
- Succeeded by: Yolonda Morris

Personal details
- Born: 1985 (age 40–41) Chicago, Illinois, U.S.
- Party: Democratic

Lakesia Collins (born 1985) is an American union organizer and politician serving as a Democratic member of the Illinois Senate for the 5th district, located on the West Side of Chicago. She previously served as a member of the Illinois House of Representatives for the 9th district from 2020 to 2023. Collins won the Democratic primary election for the 5th district in the House in 2020, and was appointed to the seat shortly afterwards to replace retiring incumbent Art Turner. She won election to full terms in 2020 and 2022, and served as the Treasurer for the Illinois Legislative Black Caucus. On August 16, 2023, she was appointed to the 5th district seat in the Senate to replace retiring incumbent Patricia Van Pelt.

== Early life and career ==
Collins was born in 1985, and attended Proviso East High School in Maywood, Illinois. She received her Certified Nursing Assistant certificate from the Samland Institute in Chicago. She worked as a nurse in nursing homes, and later became an organizer in her union, SEIU Healthcare Illinois. During her tenure as a union organizer, she advocated for legislation on nursing home reform, the proposed Illinois Fair Tax, and a higher minimum wage.

== Illinois House of Representatives (2019–23) ==
In October 2019, she began her campaign for the Illinois House of Representatives' 9th district in the 2020 election. Incumbent State Rep. Art Turner had decided not to run for re-election after holding the seat since 2011 (Turner's father, Arthur Turner, had previously held the seat for more than 30 years). Collins faced six other candidates in the Democratic primary election, including Aaron Turner, brother of the incumbent representative. She was supported by several labor unions including SEIU Healthcare Illinois and the Chicago Teachers Union and progressive organizations such as United Working Families, and received endorsements from the Chicago Sun-Times local elected officials such as Byron Sigcho-Lopez, Jeanette Taylor, and Brandon Johnson. On March 17, 2020, she won the primary election with 45.9% of the vote. On July 24, 2020, after the resignation of Turner, she was appointed to serve out the remainder of his term. She ran unopposed in the general election on November 3, 2020, and won a full term that began in January 2021. She is the first woman to represent the 9th district.

As of July 3, 2022, Representative Collins is a member of the following Illinois House committees:

- Appropriations - Public Safety Committee (HAPP)
- Child Care Accessibility & Early Childhood Education Committee (HCEC)
- Housing Committee (SHOU)
- Human Services Committee (HHSV)
- Labor & Commerce Committee (HLBR)
- Public Benefits Subcommittee (HHSV-PUBX)
- Workforce Development Subcommittee (HLBR-WORK)

== Personal life ==
Collins is a single mother of three children.

== Electoral history ==
Illinois 9th Representative District Democratic Primary, 2020
Party	Candidate	Votes	%
Democratic	Lakesia Collins	8,040	46.18
Democratic	Aaron Turner	2,603	14.95
Democratic	Trina Mangrum	1,850	10.63
Democratic	Tyjuan "Ty" Cratic	1,557	8.94
Democratic	Nicole L. 'Nikki' Harvey	1,494	8.58
Democratic	Sandra Schneller	1,161	6.67
Democratic	Maurice Edwards	704	4.04
Total votes		17,409	100.0

Illinois 9th Representative District General Election, 2020
Party	Candidate	Votes	%
Democratic	Lakesia Collins (incumbent)	38,252	100.0
Total votes		38,252	100.0

Illinois 9th Representative District General Election, 2022
Party	Candidate	Votes	%
Democratic	Lakesia Collins (incumbent)	20,413	100.0
Total votes		20,413	100.0
