= Jason Plummer (politician) =

American businessman and politician

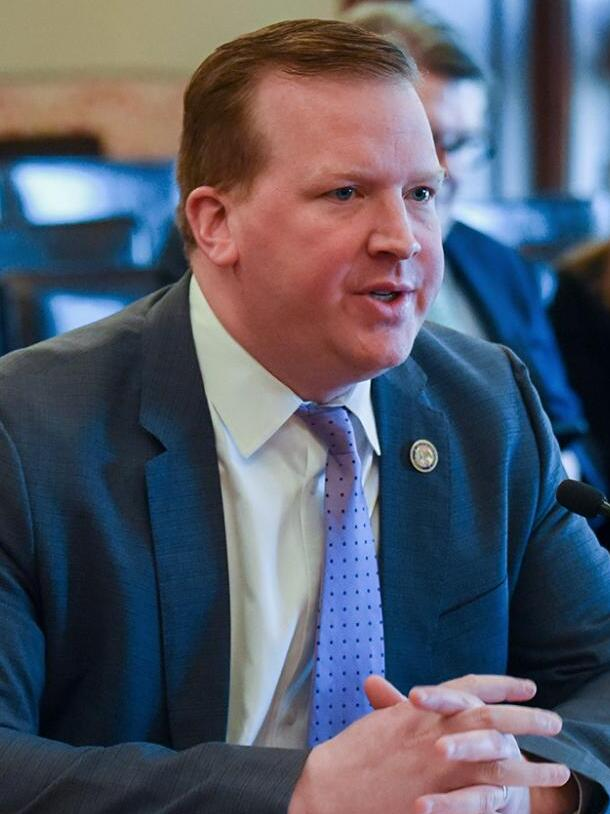
- Plummer testifying at an Illinois Senate committee hearing during the 103rd General Assembly (2024).

Member of the Illinois Senate from the 55th district
- Incumbent
- Assumed office January 9, 2019

Personal details
- Born: Robert Jason Plummer; June 4, 1982 (age 44) Chesterfield, Missouri, U.S.
- Party: Republican
- Spouse: Shannon Plummer
- Education: University of Illinois (BS)
- Website: State website

Robert Jason Plummer (born June 4, 1982) is an American businessman, former naval officer, and elected official serving as a Republican member of the Illinois Senate and in Senate Leadership as Minority Caucus Chair of the Illinois Republican Senate Caucus. Plummer represents the 55th District, located on the Illinois side of the Greater St. Louis region and includes all or portions of Bond, Clay, Clinton, Effingham, Fayette, Madison, Marion, Montgomery, Richland, Washington, and St. Clair counties.

== Early life, education, and military service ==
Plummer was born in Chesterfield, Missouri and grew up in Edwardsville, Illinois. He graduated from Edwardsville High School and then the University of Illinois Urbana-Champaign with a B.S. in finance, where he was a member of the Army ROTC Fighting Illini Battalion. Plummer interned for U.S. Senator Peter Fitzgerald and The Heritage Foundation. He commissioned as an intelligence officer in the United States Navy Reserve after college and spent time at Scott Air Force Base among other locations. He received an honorable discharge from the service in December, 2017.

== Political career ==
In 2006, Plummer was elected Chairman of the Madison County Republican Party, the minority party in a historic stronghold for the Democratic Party of Illinois. At 23, he was the youngest chairman in Illinois. Since Plummer's election, the Madison County GOP has won majority control of the county board, all county-wide offices, and a majority of the judicial and legislative seats in the region.

Plummer was the Republican nominee for Lieutenant Governor of Illinois in 2010. Plummer won the primary and was paired with the winner of the Republican gubernatorial primary for the general election. The GOP ticket narrowly lost to incumbent Illinois Governor Pat Quinn in the 2010 gubernatorial election. Plummer was the campaign's voice on economic issues in an election heavily centered on the economy and government corruption issues.

=== Election to the Illinois State Senate ===
Plummer was first elected to the Illinois Senate in 2018. He garnered over 57% of the total vote in a four-way race to win the primary election. In the general election he carried every county in the district, defeating his opponent with over 70% of the vote and becoming the first Republican State Senator from Madison County in five decades.

Plummer and has the highest lifetime conservative voting score from the American Conservative Union's CPAC Foundation among Illinois Senators. His lifetime voting record is rated by The Freedom Index as the highest of any member of the Illinois General Assembly. Plummer was named 2022 Legislator of the Year by the Associated Builders and Contractors, 2025 Senator of the year by A.B.A.T.E. (A Brotherhood Aimed Toward Education), 2026 Senator of the year by the National Federation of Independent Businesses (NFIB) - receiving their "Guardian of Small Business" award, chaired the Technology & Manufacturing Association's Small and Midsized Manufacturing Caucus, and received the St. Louis Regional Chamber's Catalyst Award. He also has been named Friend of Agriculture by the IL Farm Bureau and Champion of Free Enterprise by the IL Chamber of Commerce multiple times, and has consistently been endorsed by organizations such as the NFIB (National Federation of Independent Business), IL Chamber, NRA (National Rifle Association), Illinois Family Action, ABATE of Illinois, Illinois Federation for Right to Life, Tax Accountability, Illinois Sheriffs Association, Illinois REALTORS Association, Illinois F.O.P (Fraternal Order of Police), Chicago F.O.P., Associated Fire Fighters of Illinois, Chicago Fire Fighters, Illinois Conservatives Organization, among others.

=== 101st Illinois General Assembly ===
During the 101st Illinois General Assembly (2019-2021), Plummer served on the following committees: Executive Appointments (Minority Spokesman), Financial Institutions, Appropriations I, Appropriations II, Environment and Conservation, and Public Health.

Bills sponsored/cosponsored by Plummer during the 101st General Assembly covered a wide-range of topics, with several focused on enhancing penalties for child pornography and sexual assault, as well as enhancing protections for victims of such crimes, re-writing the Uniform Code of Military Justice in Illinois to better conform with the federal UCMJ and other Veterans issues, lessening regulations and fees on business, helping the developmentally disabled, preserving the Kaskaskia Watershed, human trafficking, enhancing penalties for criminal conduct, easing tax and regulatory burdens on business and individuals, and instituting more stringent ethics laws for legislators and government employees.

Opposition to Federal Bailouts for Illinois

During the COVID-19 pandemic in 2020, Illinois requested over $40 billion in federal bailout funds to address its significant budget deficits and unfunded pension liabilities. Senator Plummer received significant media attention for opposing this request, arguing that federal funds should not be used to rescue the state from its longstanding fiscal mismanagement and corruption issues. Plummer advocated for systemic reforms within Illinois, emphasizing the need for responsible budgeting and accountability rather than reliance on federal assistance. Plummer had opposed a similar bailout strategy from Illinois Democrats and the Obama administration during his 2010 campaign for Lieutenant Governor.

Illinois Legislature Ethics Committee

In the fall of 2019, the Illinois House and Senate established a new ethics committee to study and recommend tougher ethical laws that might prevent abuses of power, corruption, or inside dealing within the legislature. Plummer sought and received an appointment to the committee but then declined the appointment. Communications between then GOP Leader Bill Brady and Plummer came to light that revealed Plummer refused the appointment because he claimed Brady offered him the appointment on the condition that Plummer would not file ethics legislation he had drafted, a bill supported by other senators but that would have impacted Brady personally. According to media reports, Plummer had openly pressured Brady to pursue more stringent ethical reforms in private Senate Republican meetings, but the Minority Leader opted to embrace "low-hanging fruit" offered by Democrats. Plummer, a first term senator at the time, received favorable commentary from other legislators and the media for his actions and subsequently filed a package of bills focused on ethics and corruption.

=== 102nd Illinois General Assembly ===
In January 2021, Plummer was named Assistant Republican Leader on the Illinois Senate Republican Leadership Team for the 102nd Illinois General Assembly. Plummer was one of the youngest senators ever appointed to leadership and was the only senator from Southern Illinois serving in Senate leadership during the 102nd Illinois General Assembly.

During the 102nd Illinois General Assembly (2021-2023), Plummer served on the following committees: Executive Appointments (Minority Spokesperson); Financial Institutions (Minority Spokesperson); Behavioral and Mental Health; Commerce; Environment and Conservation; Health; Labor; Subcommittee on Children & Family; Sub. on Managed Care Organizations; Redistricting; Redistricting- South Cook County; Redistricting- Southern Illinois (Minority Spokesperson); Redistricting- Southwestern IL (Minority Spokesperson). He was also named to the Illinois Human Trafficking Task Force.

During the 102nd General Assembly, Plummer sponsored and co-sponsored numerous bills addressing a range of topics, including Veterans-related issues, combating the opioid epidemic, imposing stricter measures against countries with non-market-based economies, increasing criminal penalties, human trafficking prevention, child pornography, and sexual assault, enhancing protections for victims, reducing regulations and fees for businesses, supporting individuals with developmental disabilities, supporting law enforcement and correctional officers, and implementing stricter ethics laws for legislators and government employees.

Corwin Amendment

Plummer sponsored legislation (SJR 0026) to rescind Illinois' 1862 ratification of the Corwin Amendment to the United States Constitution, which aimed to end the American Civil War by preventing federal interference in the institution of slavery, during the 101st General Assembly. The legislation passed 55-0 in the Senate but was not heard at the House. He brought the legislation back during the 102nd General Assembly, and it passed both chambers unanimously, making Illinois the 3rd state in 150 years to rescind their ratification of the Corwin Amendment. Plummer worked with several historians to address this complicated topic and sought and received support from members of the Illinois Legislative Black Caucus.

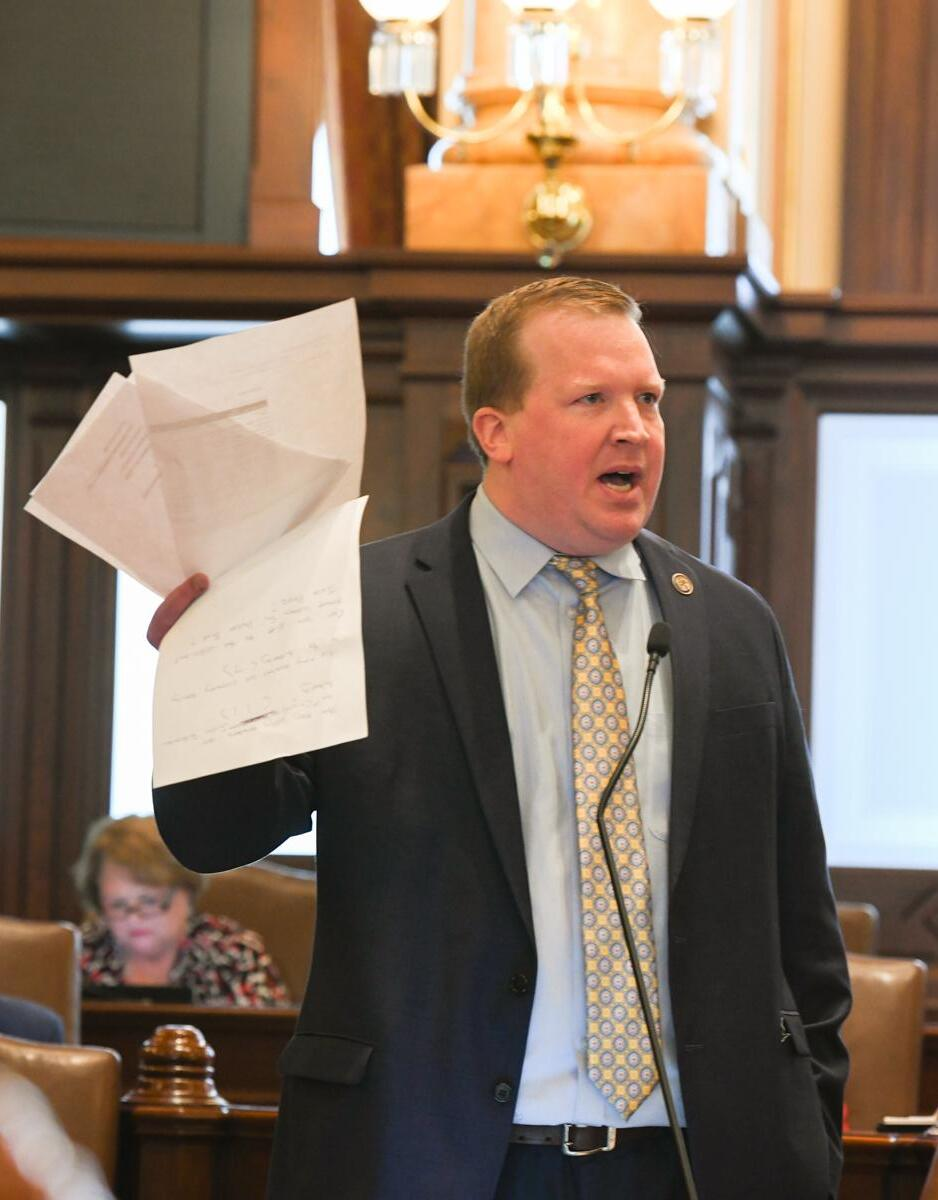
Plummer speaking on the floor of the Illinois Senate during the 101st General Assembly (2020).

=== 103rd Illinois General Assembly ===
Plummer was reelected to the state senate in 2022 and reelected as the Assistant Republican Leader for the Illinois Senate Republican Caucus in 2023. He served on the following committees: Executive Appointments (Minority Spokesman), Financial Institutions (Minority Spokesman), Veterans Affairs, Health and Human Services, Human Rights, and Labor.

During the 103rd GA, Plummer pushed for reforms at the Illinois Department of Corrections, calling for more accountability and raising concerns relating to transparency, operational challenges, staff assaults, early release of prisoners, and contraband in prisons. After multiple staff members were hospitalized due to an event at Graham Correctional Facility, Plummer called for transparency regarding the incident. As the Minority Spokesman on the Executive Appointments Committee, he opposed the confirmation of the Acting Director of IDOC, an appointment that remains in limbo.

Plummer actively proposed legislation during the 103rd General Assembly to protect law-abiding gun owners during the litigation relating to Illinois wide-reaching assault weapons ban, school choice, pushing back on the state's multi-billion plan to provide free health care to noncitizens, as well as being a point-person for the Senate GOP on the issue of preserving tax-credit scholarships.

Prisoner Review Board Controversy

The Illinois Prisoner Review Board, a 15-person body appointed by the Governor and confirmed by the State Senate faced controversy and came under scrutiny for voting to release early inmates convicted murder(s), rape(s), and other violent offenses. 9 of 15 the appointees serving on the Prisoner Review Board had not been confirmed by the Illinois Senate, as required by the Constitution of Illinois. The Illinois Constitution requires these appointments to be confirmed by the Senate within 60 session days of their appointment by the governor. However, Governor J. B. Pritzker was allowing them to serve for up to 59 days, withdrawing their appointments, and then reappointing them days later, circumventing the Senate.

Senator Plummer, as Republican spokesman on the Executive Appointments Committee, highlighted the issues and led questioning and investigations of the Prisoner Review Board's practices. Plummer called for accountability, writing op-eds, holding press conferences, and pushing for Senate votes on unconfirmed appointees. Following the murder of an 11 year old by a prisoner released early by the board, Plummer appeared in national media continuing to call for reforms. These efforts culminated in legislative hearings and the eventual rejection of several board members by the Senate and resignation of other members of the board. The controversy also prompted a shift in the board's approach to parole decisions. After this increased scrutiny on appointments, the board reduced its rate of granting parole for serious cases from over 40% in 2021 under the administration of Governor J.B. Pritzker to under 15% in 2024, a number more consistent to results under previous administrations.

=== 104th Illinois General Assembly ===
Plummer was reelected in November 2024 for a term starting in January 2025. He received the most votes of any Illinois Senator running for election during the election cycle. Plummer was reelected as the Assistant Republican Leader for the Illinois Senate Republican Caucus in 2025 and was named to the following senate committees: Executive Appointments (Minority Spokesman), Financial Institutions (Minority Spokesman), Veterans Affairs, Labor, Health and Human Services, Human Rights, and Public Safety and Infrastructure Appropriations for the 104th General Assembly.

During the 104th General Assembly, Plummer was involved as sponsor or cosponsor of numerous bills covering a wide range of topics, including ethics reform, fiscal responsibility, human trafficking, criminal justice and public safety, Veterans issues, regulatory reform, school choice, tax reform, and bills relating to infrastructure, data, and supply chain security.

In his capacity as Republican Spokesman of the Executive Appointments Committee, Plummer focused on reform at the Illinois Department of Correction, including calling for the removal of the Acting Director of the Department of Corrections. Plummer was published in the Chicago Tribune countering Governor J.B. Pritzker's testimony in the U.S. House of Representatives relating to Illinois' sanctuary state policies. Plummer led Senate GOP opposition to a $6 billion tax increase proposal, the 'gut-and-replace' Illinois legislative maneuver often used to shield legislation from public transparency and legislative committees, additional regulations on the economy, and various tax and fee increases, including a delivery tax on residential deliveries often referred to as a "Amazon tax" or "pizza tax".

Election as Senate Republican Caucus Chair

Plummer was elected Caucus Chair by his colleagues in 2026 after serving for several years as Assistant Leader in the Illinois Senate Republican Caucus. Senate Minority Leader John Curran supported the appointment, citing Plummer's previous service as Assistant Republican Leader and his work coordinating members and communicating the caucus message.

== Business career ==
Plummer is president of R.P. Lumber, one of the largest family-owned hardware, home center, and building material companies in the United States. The company was founded by Plummer's parents, Robert and Donna, in 1977 and has grown from one retail location to over 100 retail, design, manufacturing, and distribution locations across Illinois, Indiana, Iowa, Missouri, South Dakota, Wisconsin, and Wyoming. In 2017, the North American Retail Hardware Association selected Plummer from an international pool of candidates to be named the Young Retailer of the Year. Plummer was awarded the Lumberman of the Year award in 2020 by the Illinois Lumber and Material Dealers Association.

In 2021, Plummer led the effort to acquire the bankrupt farm and ranch retailer Stock+Field. Over 20 locations were re-opened and rebranded as R.P. Home & Harvest, saving the jobs of approximately 1,000 people across Illinois, Indiana, Ohio, and Wisconsin. Plummer served as president of the company while also serving as vice-president of R.P. Lumber, and, after operating the stores and expanding the company, the newly rejuvenated chain was sold to Runnings in 2023.

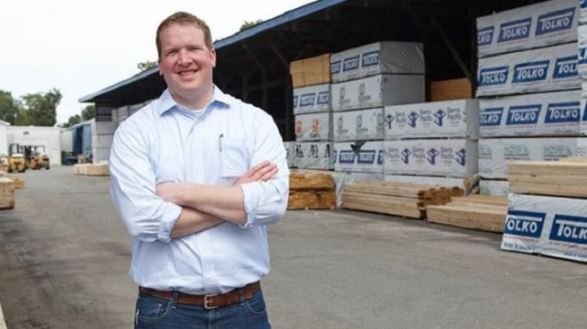
Senator Jason Plummer, at a R.P. Lumber location in Illinois (2017)

Plummer is actively involved in managing businesses and investments spanning multiple industries. He is involved in the development, management, and ownership of a large portfolio of commercial, agricultural, and hospitality properties.

Plummer is President and Chairman of Country Bancorp, a holding company with investments in community banks. He serves on several corporate boards, including LBM Advantage, a large buying cooperative in the building materials industry; APX10, a Danish data analytics firm operating in the U.S. and Europe; AMI Global, an IIoT firm operating in the U.S., Israel, and Europe; Zing America, a U.S.-based fintech; and as Chairman of Constitution Bank. Plummer is an investor in the Los Angeles Dodgers.

== Personal life ==
Plummer and his wife have three children. Plummer is Baptist and previously served on the board of the Baptist Children's Home and Family Services as well as other non-profits such as the Illinois Lumber and Material Dealers Association, Leadership Council of Southwestern Illinois, the Edwardsville C.E.O. program, and Boys Scouts of America, Lewis and Clark Council. He has coached several youth sports teams.

The Plummer Family Park in Edwardsville, IL, a $17.2 million 83 acre sports park, was named after the family due to financial and land donations to the city's parks department. The R.P. Lumber Center, an $11.2 million recreational complex containing a regulation ice hockey rink, indoor track, and other amenities, opened in June 2022 following a donation from the Plummer family. Plummer claims his hobbies are "working, reading, and spending time with my family."

== Electoral history ==
2010 Governor and Lt. Governor of Illinois General Election
Party	Candidate	Votes	%
Democratic	Pat Quinn &Sheila Simon	1,745,219	46.8
Republican	Bill Brady & Jason Plummer	1,713,385	45.9
Independent	Scott Lee Cohen & Baxter Swilley	135,705	3.6
Green	Rich Whitney & Don Crawford	100,756	2.7
Libertarian	Lex Green	34,681	0.9
Independent	Write-in	243	0.0
Total votes		3,729,989	100.0

2018 Illinois State Senate District 54 General Election
Party	Candidate	Votes	%
Republican	Jason Plummer	59,476	70.0
Democratic	Brian Stout	25,510	30.0
Total votes		84,986	100.0

2022 Illinois State Senate District 55 General Election
Party	Candidate	Votes	%
Republican	Jason Plummer	75,849	100.0
Total votes		75,849	100.0

2024 Illinois State Senate District 55 General Election
Party	Candidate	Votes	%
Republican	Jason Plummer	95,805	100.0
Total votes		95,805	100.0

Party political offices
Preceded by Joe Birkett	Republican nominee for Lieutenant Governor of Illinois; 2010	Succeeded by Evelyn Sanguinetti
