= Bob Schillerstrom =

Illinois politician

Chairman of the Illinois State Toll Highway Authority Board
- In office June 2015 – January 2019

Chairman of the DuPage County Board
- In office December 1998 – December 2010
- Preceded by: Gayle Franzen
- Succeeded by: Dan Cronin

Personal details
- Born: March 2, 1952 (age 74)
- Party: Republican
- Education: Chicago-Kent College of Law; Illinois College
- Profession: Attorney

Robert Schillerstrom (born March 2, 1952) is an American politician and the former DuPage County, Illinois board chairman. He currently resides in Naperville, Illinois, and has been a resident of DuPage County for over 40 years. Schillerstrom is a suburban leader and lifelong Illinois resident. Schillerstrom was elected as county board chairman in 1998 with two-thirds of the vote.

== Early life ==
Schillerstrom graduated from Naperville Community High School and soon went on to Jacksonville, Illinois, where he attended Illinois College and obtained a bachelor's degree in religion and history, graduating with honors. Schillerstrom was also a member of Phi Beta Kappa. Upon graduating from Illinois College, Schillerstrom obtained his Juris Doctor degree from the Illinois Institute of Technology Chicago-Kent College of Law.

== Career ==
From 1980 to 1983, Schillerstrom prosecuted cases as an assistant state's attorney for DuPage County. He later served as chairman of the DuPage County Board from December 1998 through December 2010. On June 28, 2009, Schillerstrom announced to a group of about 200 supporters in Naperville that he would seek the office of Governor of Illinois. On January 22, 2010, Schillerstrom withdrew from the race for governor and endorsed fellow Republican Jim Ryan.

=== Illinois Tollway Chair ===
In June 2015, Schillerstrom became chairman of the Illinois State Toll Highway Authority, having been appointed by Governor Bruce Rauner. He resigned in January 2019, after an investigation by the Daily Herald discovered that he had been awarding high paying jobs within the tollway authority to firms with political connections and relatives.

After leaving the Illinois State Toll Highway Authority, he became a partner at Ice Miller LLP law firm. His department is in Ice Miller's Public Affairs and Public & Municipal Finance Groups. He also became a trustee of Morton Arboretum. In the 2022 elections, he ran for president of the Forest Preserve District of DuPage County.

== See also ==
- Illinois gubernatorial election, 2010
