= Arthur L. Turner =

American politician

Arthur Turner

Member of the Illinois House of Representatives from the 9th district
- In office 1981–2010
- Succeeded by: Art Turner

Personal details
- Born: December 2, 1950 (age 75) Chicago, Illinois
- Party: Democratic
- Spouse: Rosalyn

Arthur L. Turner (born December 2, 1950) is a former Democratic member of the Illinois House of Representatives, representing the 9th District from 1981 to 2010, and serving as the Deputy Majority Leader. He was a candidate for the Democratic Party nomination for Lieutenant Governor of Illinois in 2010, but placed second to Scott Lee Cohen. Mr. Cohen relinquished the nomination after controversies involving his personal life became public. On March 27, 2010, the 38-member Democratic State Central Committee, chose Sheila Simon to be the candidate for Lieutenant Governor of Illinois over Turner.

== Education ==
Turner attended St. Mel High School, graduating with honors, and went on to Illinois State University, earned a B.S. in Business Administration, and Lewis University, earning a Master of Science in Social Justice.

== Career ==
After earning his master's degree, Turner worked as an investigator for the Cook County States' Attorney from 1973 to 1981.

== State representative ==
In 1985, a federal judge ordered William Carothers, his two sons including Isaac Carothers, and a fourth man to pay $152,000 in damages as a result of a campaign of violence and intimidation against Turner. William Carothers' former assistant, Ozzie Hitchins, challenged incumbent Illinois State Representative Turner in 1982. Hitchins was supported by the then imprisoned William Carothers. Turner aides were threatened with guns and one Turner aide suffering severe injuries to the side of the head, including broken bones. Turner and aides filed a civil lawsuit following their defeat by Hitchins.

As a member of the Illinois House of Representatives, Turner is a member of two committees, the Committee of the Whole and Rules. He has also served as the Deputy Majority Leader for eighteen years. As a State Representative, Turner has promoted fair housing legislation. He spearheaded a trust fund to buy and renovate housing to make affordable units available to low-income families. The Fund averages about $18 million per year and helps families statewide. Turner also supported tougher restrictions when deciding whether a repeat domestic violence abuser should be let out on bail.

== Personal life ==
Representative Turner and his wife have two sons and reside in the neighborhood of North Lawndale, Chicago. He was born and raised there, and lives a half a block away from his childhood home.
