= Rickey Hendon =

American politician

Member of the Illinois Senate from the 5th district
- In office January 13, 1993 – February 24, 2011
- Preceded by: Miguel del Valle
- Succeeded by: Annazette Collins

Personal details
- Born: December 8, 1953 (age 72) Cleveland, Ohio, U.S.
- Party: Democratic
- Spouse: Dawn Hendon

Rickey R. Hendon (born December 8, 1953) is an American politician. He is former Illinois Senator for the 5th district, serving from 1993 to 2011.

== Public service ==
Before running for the state senate, Hendon was alderman of the 27th ward in Chicago, Illinois. Prior to that, he was Secretary and Treasurer for the Cook County Forest Preserve.

== Senate career ==
Hendon became an Illinois State Senator in 1992. He served as an Assistant Majority Leader, Co-Chairman of the Senate Executive Appointments Committee, Vice-Chairman of the Environment and Energy Committee and a member of the Labor and Commerce Committee and the Illinois Legislative Black Caucus.

Hendon sponsored legislation that would create a pilot program in the Chicago Public School that allows the Chicago Board of Education to establish a program to discourage criminal behavior by providing prison tours.

Because of his interest in health care, Hendon sponsored a bill designed to assist low-income families on Medicaid, by restricting the co-payment for brand name drugs to $3 and eliminating co-pay for generic drugs.

Another recent bill Hendon sponsored was aimed at expanding opportunities for minority owned businesses to compete and ultimately bring additional film projects and television studios to Illinois.

There was substantial tension between Hendon and then colleague Barack Obama, culminating after five years in a 2002 shoving match. Nonetheless, Hendon supported Obama in the 2008 presidential election.

In 2009, Senator Hendon was a principal proponent of a bill for $31 billion in capital-spending for education passed in May by the state Legislature. Part of the bill would have ensured that 40 million in funds would go to Chicago State University for a West Side campus. The interim president said he had no knowledge of plans for West Side branch. However, a 2007 feasibility study indicated strong community and prospective student support for a satellite campus. He resigned his elected office in the Illinois State on 2/24/11.

== Controversies ==
In October 2010, a federal grand jury issued subpoenas for state grants sponsored by Hendon, and there is currently an investigation going on regarding those grants. In that same month, Hendon made "nasty" remarks about State Senator Bill Brady, who was the Republican nominee for Governor. While introducing Illinois Governor Pat Quinn, Hendon told the crowd that he had "never served with such an idiotic, racist, sexist, homophobic person in my life... If you think that women have no rights whatsoever, except to have his children, vote for Bill Brady. If you think gay and lesbian people need to be locked up and shot in the head, vote for Bill Brady." Hendon's remarks were immediately disavowed by Governor Quinn, among others, and Hendon was sharply criticized by members of the Illinois media. Hendon later tried to apologize to Brady on the Senate floor, but Brady would not accept his apology.

== Personal life ==
Hendon was born in Cleveland, Ohio. He and his wife, Dawn, have five children. They attend Mt. Sinai Baptist Church. Hendon was leader of the Senate softball team. In 1992 he wrote and starred in the film "Butterscotch and Chocolate."
