= Derrick Smith (politician) =

Illinois politician

Member of the Illinois House of Representatives from the 10th district
- In office January 9, 2013 – June 11, 2014
- Preceded by: Eddie Winters
- Succeeded by: Pamela Reaves-Harris
- In office March 24, 2011 – August 17, 2012
- Preceded by: Annazette Collins
- Succeeded by: Eddie Winters

Personal details
- Born: Chicago, Illinois
- Party: Democratic
- Spouse: Valerie
- Profession: State Representative

Derrick Smith is a former member of the Illinois House of Representatives. As a Democrat, he represented the 10th District from March 2011 – August 2012 and again January 2013 – June 2014. Darrius "Koach" Smith is the youngest of Smith's children.

== Education and career ==
Smith received an associate's degree in liberal arts from Malcolm X College in 2003. In 2005, he received a B.S. in business administration from DePaul University.

Smith then served as deputy director of Accounting Revenue for Jesse White, the Secretary of State of Illinois. He then served on the Human Services, Cities & Villages, State Government Administration, Appropriations-Public Safety, and Housing committees in the Illinois General Assembly.

Smith was appointed to the Illinois House in March 2011 when his predecessor, Annazette Collins, was appointed to the Illinois State Senate. During the 2012 Democratic primary, Smith defeated challenger Tom Swiss receiving 76.7% of the votes cast.

== Legal troubles ==
=== Indictment for corruption and 1st term ===
On March 13, 2012, Representative Smith was indicted on bribery charges after allegedly receiving a $7,000 cash payment in exchange for writing a letter in support of a day care center to receive a $50,000 state grant. The indictment was the result of a campaign worker for Smith who was also working as an informant for the Federal Bureau of Investigation. According to the indictment Smith wrote the letter to help a fictitious day care owner in a bid for an Early Childhood Construction Grant from the Illinois State Capital Development Board. Following his victory in the 2012 Primary, Republicans in the State General Assembly have called for a special House panel to investigate the corruption charges against Smith. House Speaker Michael Madigan announced shortly afterwards that three representatives had been appointed and would begin investigating in March 2012.

Smith was expelled from the Illinois House of Representatives by a vote of 100 to 6 on August 17, 2012. However, Smith was still on the ballot for the November 2012 General Election. Smith won reelection and was sworn on January 9, 2013, reclaiming his seat. Per state law, he could not be expelled a second time for the same offense.

=== Bribery conviction and 2nd term ===
In March 2014, Smith lost his district's primary election to Pamela Reaves-Harris, rendering Smith a lame duck official.

Jurors deliberated for about four hours over two days before returning a guilty verdict on 10 June 2014, which automatically resulted in Smith being removed from his House seat for a second time. Federal prosecutors sought a sentence of five years in federal prison.

== Personal life ==
Smith and his wife, Valerie, have three sons and six grandchildren.
