= Pamela Harris (photographer) =

Canadian/American photographer

- Born: 1940 (age 85–86); Erie, Pennsylvania, United States
- Education: Pomona College (BA)

Pamela Harris (born 1940) is a Canadian photographer. She founded her practice on her social and political beliefs.

== Early life ==
Born in Erie, Pennsylvania, Harris grew up in Pennsylvania, New Jersey, Montana, and California. She studied English literature at Pomona College, receiving a BA degree in 1962. She moved to Cambridge, Massachusetts to teach, where she became interested in photography. Harris emigrated to Canada in 1967 and lives in Toronto.

== Work ==
A self-taught photographer working primarily in black-and-white, Harris has focused on people in their environments, documenting a variety of communities—Newfoundland fishing villages, a community in Nunavut, her own extended family, the United Farmworkers Union, nannies, breast-cancer survivors and activist women across Canada. In 1972 and 1973 she photographed in Spence Bay, N.W.T. (now Taloyoak, Nunavut), work published as Another Way of Being. She also built a community darkroom in Taloyoak and taught darkroom skills to Inuit craftswomen who used it to document and promote their work. From 1985 to 1989 Harris photographed the grass-roots women's movement across Canada, pairing her portraits with text by the women portrayed. Faces of Feminism was widely exhibited across Canada and was published by 2nd Story Press in 1992. Her work is included in the collections of the Art Gallery of Ontario and the National Gallery of Canada.
