= Pamela Reaves-Harris =

American politician and lawyer

Member of the Illinois House of Representatives from the 10th district
- In office January 2015 – January 2017
- Preceded by: Derrick Smith
- Succeeded by: Melissa Conyears

Personal details
- Born: Chicago, Illinois, U.S.
- Party: Democratic
- Children: Two Daughters
- Education: University of Illinois (B.A.); Chicago-Kent College of Law (J.D.)
- Profession: Attorney

Pamela Reaves-Harris is an Illinois lawyer and Democratic politician. A former administrative law judge, she defeated Derrick Smith in the Democratic primary in 2014, and then won election to the Illinois House of Representatives to represent the 10th district. She won a five way Democratic primary that included former State Representative Eddie Winters. However, Reaves-Harris chose not to seek re-election in 2016. She was succeeded by Melissa Conyears.
