= Joseph F. Fanta =

American politician

Member of the Illinois House of Representatives
- In office 1957–1963
- In office 1965–1967
- Preceded by: At-large district created
- Succeeded by: At-large district abolished

Personal details
- Party: Democratic

Joseph F. Fanta (February 21, 1914 – May 2, 1988) was an American politician.

Fanta was born in Chicago, Illinois. He went to the public schools. Fanta studied engineering at Northwestern University and Siebel Institute. Fanta was involved with the Democratic Party. He served as bailiff and deputy clerk for the Chicago Municipal Court. Fanta served in the Illinois House of Representatives from 1957 to 1962 and 1965 and 1966. Fanta died at Martha Washington Hospital in Chicago, Illinois.
