= 1974 United States Senate election in Illinois =

- November 5, 1974
- Turnout: 49.35%
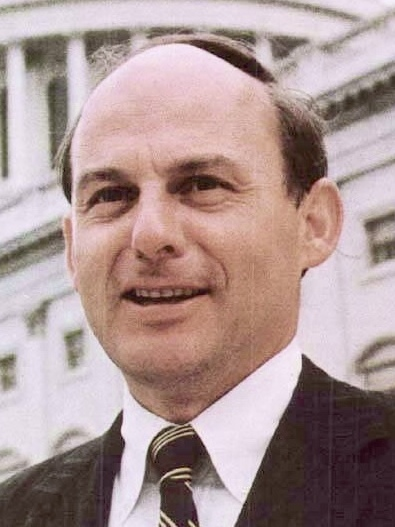

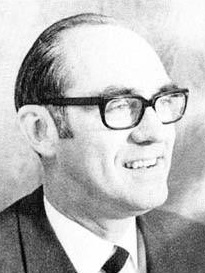
Nominee	Adlai Stevenson III	George Burditt
Party	Democratic	Republican
Popular vote	1,811,496	1,084,884
Percentage	62.15%	37.22%
- County results Stevenson: 50–60% 60–70% 70–80% Burditt: 50–60% 60–70%
U.S. senator before election
Adlai Stevenson III
Democratic
Elected U.S. Senator
Adlai Stevenson III
Democratic

The 1974 United States Senate election in Illinois took place on November 5, 1974. Incumbent Democratic U.S. Senator Adlai Stevenson III, who was first elected in a special election in 1970, was re-elected to a full term in office, defeating Republican George Burditt by a landslide margin of 62% to 37%.

== Background ==
The primaries (held March 19) and general elections coincided with those for House and those for state offices.

Turnout in the primary elections was 24.88%, with a total of 1,502,852 votes cast. Turnout during the general election was 49.35%, with 2,914,666 votes cast.

== Democratic primary ==
=== Candidates ===
- Adlai Stevenson III, incumbent U.S. senator since 1970
- Walter Dakin Williams, candidate for Senate in 1972 and brother of playwright Tennessee Williams

=== Results ===
Democratic primary results
Party	Candidate	Votes	%
Democratic	Adlai Stevenson III (incumbent)	822,248	82.90%
Democratic	W. Dakin Williams	169,662	17.11%
Total votes		991,910	100.00%

== Republican primary ==
=== Candidates ===
- George Burditt, attorney and former state representative from Western Springs
- Lawrence Daly, perennial candidate

==== Declined ====
- John B. Anderson, U.S. representative from Rockford
- Donald Rumsfeld, U.S. ambassador to NATO and former U.S. representative from Wilmette

=== Results ===
Republican primary results
Party	Candidate	Votes	%
Republican	George Burditt	432,796	84.71%
Republican	Lawrence Daly	78,146	15.29%
Total votes		510,942	100.00%

== General election ==
=== Candidates ===
- George Burditt, attorney and former state representative from Western Springs (Republican)
- Ishmael Flory, civil rights activist and trade union organizer (Communist)
- Edward Heisler (Socialist Workers)
- Adlai Stevenson III, incumbent U.S. senator since 1970 (Democratic)

=== Results ===
1974 United States Senate election in Illinois
Party	Candidate	Votes	%	±%
Democratic	Adlai Stevenson III (incumbent)	1,811,496	62.15%	▲4.77
Republican	George Burditt	1,084,884	37.22%	▼5.00
Socialist Workers	Edward Heisler	12,413	0.43%	▲0.18
Communist	Ishmael Flory	5,873	0.20%	N/A
Total votes		2,914,666	100.00%	
Democratic hold		Swing		

== See also ==
- 1974 United States Senate elections
