= Annazette Collins =

American politician

Member of the Illinois Senate from the 5th district
- In office March 16, 2011 – January 8, 2013
- Preceded by: Rickey Hendon
- Succeeded by: Patricia Van Pelt Watkins

Member of the Illinois House of Representatives from the 10th district
- In office January 10, 2001 – March 16, 2011
- Preceded by: Coy Pugh
- Succeeded by: Derrick Smith

Personal details
- Born: April 28, 1962 (age 64) Chicago, Illinois, U.S.
- Party: Democratic
- Spouse: Keith Langston
- Education: Chicago State University

Annazette Collins is an American politician. She was a member of the Illinois State Senate from 2011 to 2013, representing the 5th district. She previously was a member of the Illinois House of Representatives, representing the 10th district from 2001 to 2011. During the 2012 Democratic Party primary election, Collins lost to Patricia Van Pelt, receiving 46.4 percent of the vote.

== Early life ==
Collins earned her undergraduate degree in sociology and her master's in Criminal Justice from Chicago State University.

== Career ==
Prior to her election as state representative, Collins held various positions in social services and criminal justice agencies. Collins worked as an Administrator of the Chicago Board of Education, a Public Service Administrator for the Illinois Department of Children and Family Services (DCFS), Cook County Social Services, Probation Department, and a Correctional Officer with the Bureau of Prisons.

== State representative ==
Collins listed her legislative priorities as improving education, expanding access to quality health care, raising the age of majority for juveniles and reforming juvenile justice system.

In 2008, she sponsored tax legislation that would raise the Illinois income tax rate.

Ms. Collins co-sponsored FamilyCare, which allows working parents of KidCare-eligible children, to have access to state subsidized health care. Collins worked on legislation to allow patients to sue health maintenance organizations for harmful and delayed medical procedures.

Collins worked to move children out of state custody into family environments whenever possible. She was the chief sponsor of adoption reform legislation allowing godparents and second cousins to adopt children in the custody of DCFS.

== Controversy ==
In July 2008, the Illinois State Board of Elections fined Collins' campaign committee $20,000 and ordered her to issue an apology for filing political finance reports from 2005 to 2007 that reflected the raising, but not spending, of campaign money. The board's orders stemmed from a complaint filed by the Illinois Campaign for Political Reform indicating a lack of contributions or expenditures on her state-mandated campaign disclosure. Collins' campaign committee has corrected 18 of its previously filed reports after the complaint was filed.

=== 2024 conviction ===
On February 13, 2024, Collins was convicted of four of six tax-related charges she was indicted on, including willful false statements on her tax returns for 2014 and 2015, failure to file an individual income tax return for 2016, and failure to file a corporate income tax return in 2016 for her consulting and lobbying business, Kourtnie Nicole Corp. On June 21, 2024, Collins was sentenced to one year in a federal prison and ordered to pay $110,852 in restitution.

In 2025 the United States Court of Appeals for the Seventh Circuit upheld all convictions.

== Personal life ==
Collins is married to Keith Langston and they have two daughters, Angelique Nicole and Taylor Kourtnie.
