= George Burditt (lawyer) =

American lawyer and politician

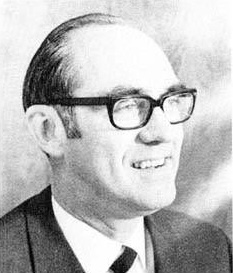

Member of the Illinois House of Representatives
- In office 1965–1973
- Preceded by: At-large district created
- Succeeded by: William Mahar

Personal details
- Born: George Miller Burditt Jr. September 21, 1922 Chicago, Illinois, US
- Died: March 12, 2013 (aged 90) LaGrange, Illinois, US
- Party: Republican
- Education: Harvard University (BA, LLB)
- Occupation: Lawyer and Politician

Military service
- Allegiance: United States
- Branch/service: U.S. Army Air Force
- Years of service: 1943–1945
- Battles/wars: World War II

George Miller Burditt Jr. (September 21, 1922 – March 12, 2013) was an American lawyer and politician, best known for his work on food safety law.

== Early life and education ==
Burditt was born at St. Anthony's Hospital on the West Side of Chicago, but grew up in La Grange, Illinois. He attended Lyons Township High School in LaGrange, starring on the basketball team (and later being inducted into the Illinois Basketball Hall of Fame), and serving as valedictorian upon his graduation in 1940.

Burditt went on to attend Harvard, completing his degree in 1944 while also serving as a pilot in the Air Force from 1943 to 1945. He followed this with a degree from Harvard Law School after the war, graduating in 1948.

== Legal career ==
After his graduation from Harvard Law, Burditt entered legal practice in Chicago, first at the firm of Chadwell, Keck, Kayser, Ruggles & McLaren, and later at Swift & Co. In 1969, Burditt started his own law firm, Burditt & Calkins. This firm later became part of Bell, Boyd & Lloyd, which was later acquired by K&L Gates.

Burditt continued practicing law, later at his daughter's firm, until the final months of his life at age 90. He was recognized as "the dean of attorneys in the United States practicing food and drug law."

In addition to his legal practice and political and charity work, Burditt taught as an adjunct member of the faculty at Northwestern University Law School for thirty years, from 1967 to 1997.

== Political career ==
Burditt took to political life quickly in the 1950s, chairing the Young Republicans of Cook County from 1952 to 1953. He served as state vice-chair of the Eisenhower re-election campaign in 1956, and in numerous other capacities.

In 1964, Burditt was elected as a Republican member of the Illinois House of Representatives, in an unprecedented statewide at-large election. In subsequent elections, he ran in the 9th state legislative district; he held this seat until 1972. In the 77th General Assembly of Illinois, 1971–1972, Burditt served as Assistant Majority Leader. During his career, he sponsored numerous reforms of food and drug safety and environmental law; he was the chief sponsor of the 1970 Illinois Environmental Protection Act and the Illinois Endangered Species Act.

In 1974, Burditt ran against incumbent U.S. Sen. Adlai Stevenson III but lost amid a nationwide wave of anti-Republican sentiment following President Gerald Ford's pardon of Richard Nixon. He did not run for office again after this, although he remained active behind the scenes.

== Charitable work ==
Burditt was highly active in the nonprofit sphere, serving as trustee and donor to numerous Chicago-area institutions, including the Newberry Library. Organizations he chaired at one point or another included the Chicago Bar Association, Harvard Law School Association, Citizens of Greater Chicago, Chicago Civic Association, and the Junior Association of Commerce and Industry.

In addition, from 1964 to January 1967, Burditt served as chairman of the Board of Trustees of Shimer College, then located in Mount Carroll, Illinois; he had joined the board in 1956. His tenure as chairman overlapped with the period in this tiny school's history known as the "Grotesque Internecine Struggle", a bitter political fight between younger faculty and students on the one hand and older faculty and the administration on the other. Although he was not directly involved, a letter sent by Burditt played a galvanizing role in the struggle:

A week long campaign by the Apathy Committee climaxed on December with a panel discussion featuring students, faculty, and administrators. Three days later Dr. David Weiser received a letter from George Burditt, chairman of the Board of Trustees, suggesting that he resign. Apathy hasn't been mentioned since.

== Death and legacy ==
Burditt died on March 12, 2013, at Adventist La Grange Memorial Hospital, following a heart attack earlier in the month.

== Works cited ==
- George Burditt; Horace Waggoner (1983). George Burditt Memoir (PDF). Vol. 1. University of Illinois at Springfield. Archived from the original (PDF) on December 30, 2006.
- George Burditt; Horace Waggoner (1983). George Burditt Memoir (PDF). Vol. 2. University of Illinois at Springfield. Archived from the original (PDF) on December 30, 2006.
- State of Illinois (1965). Illinois Blue Book 1964–1965.
- State of Illinois (1972). Illinois Blue Book 1971–1972.

Party political offices
| Preceded by Ralph Tyler Smith | Republican nominee for U.S. Senator from Illinois (Class 3); 1974 | Succeeded by Dave O'Neal |
