= Arthur Berman =

American lawyer and politician (1935–2020)

Arthur L. "Art" Berman (May 4, 1935 – June 6, 2020) was an American lawyer and politician.

Born in Chicago, Illinois, Berman attended the Chicago public schools and Senn High School. In 1955, Berman graduated from University of Illinois Urbana-Champaign and then received his law degree in 1958 from the Northwestern University Pritzker School of Law. He practiced law in Chicago and was involved with the Democratic Party. Berman served in the Illinois House of Representatives from 1967 to 1976 and then served in the Illinois Senate from 1977 until 2000. He was Jewish.
