= Johnsonville, Illinois =

Johnsonville
- Village
- Location of Johnsonville in Wayne County, Illinois.
- Coordinates: 38°31′15″N 88°32′18″W
- Country: United States
- State: Illinois
- County: Wayne

Area
  - Total: 0.21 sq mi (0.55 km^{2})
  - Land: 0.21 sq mi (0.55 km^{2})
  - Water: 0 sq mi (0.00 km^{2})
- Elevation: 545 ft (166 m)

Population (2020)
  - Total: 72
  - Density: 337.4/sq mi (130.27/km^{2})
- Time zone: UTC-6 (CST)
  - Summer (DST): UTC-5 (CDT)
- Area code: 618
- FIPS code: 17-38531
- GNIS feature ID: 2398306

Johnsonville is a village in Wayne County, Illinois, United States. The population was 72 at the 2020 census.

== Geography ==
According to the 2010 census, Johnsonville has a total area of 0.21 square miles (0.54 km^{2}), all land.

== Demographics ==
Historical population
Census	Pop.	Note	%±
1900	268		—
1910	225		−16.0%
1920	133		−40.9%
1930	96		−27.8%
1940	98		2.1%
1950	105		7.1%
1960	96		−8.6%
1970	72		−25.0%
1980	71		−1.4%
1990	68		−4.2%
2000	69		1.5%
2010	77		11.6%
2020	72		−6.5%
U.S. Decennial Census

As of the census of 2000, there were 69 people, 25 households, and 20 families residing in the village. The population density was 325.9 inhabitants per square mile (125.8/km^{2}). There were 33 housing units at an average density of 155.9 per square mile (60.2/km^{2}). The racial makeup of the village was 100.00% White.

There were 25 households, out of which 40.0% had children under the age of 18 living with them, 64.0% were married couples living together, 12.0% had a female householder with no husband present, and 20.0% were non-families. 20.0% of all households were made up of individuals, and 12.0% had someone living alone who was 65 years of age or older. The average household size was 2.76 and the average family size was 3.10.

In the village, the population was spread out, with 27.5% under the age of 18, 8.7% from 18 to 24, 31.9% from 25 to 44, 20.3% from 45 to 64, and 11.6% who were 65 years of age or older. The median age was 36 years. For every 100 females, there were 68.3 males. For every 100 females age 18 and over, there were 92.3 males.

The median income for a household in the village was $45,000, and the median income for a family was $41,250. Males had a median income of $22,500 versus $25,000 for females. The per capita income for the village was $15,411. None of the population and none of the families were below the poverty line.
