= Don A. Moore (politician) =

American politician

Member of the Illinois House of Representatives

Personal details
- Party: Republican

Don A. Moore (January 1, 1928 – March 28, 2012) was an American lawyer, judge, and politician.

Moore was born in Chicago, Illinois. He went to the Forest Ridge School and to the Morgan Park Academy. He received his law degree from John Marshall Law School and was admitted to the Illinois bar in 1950. Moore, his wife, and their family lived in Midlothian, Illinois and he practiced law in Midlothian. He served as an Illinois assistant states attorney and as the master in chancery for the Illinois Circuit Court in Cook County, Illinois. Moore served in the Illinois House of Representatives from 1965 to 1973 and in the Illinois Senate from 1973 to 1981. Moore then served as an Illinois Circuit Court judge.
