= Coy Pugh =

American politician (born 1952)

Member of the Illinois House of Representatives from the 10th district
- In office 1993–2001
- Succeeded by: Annazette Collins

Personal details
- Party: Democratic
- Education: Northeastern Illinois University; University of Chicago

Coy Pugh (born February 27, 1952) is an American Methodist minister, businessman, and politician.

Born in Chicago, Illinois, Pugh received his bachelor's degree in inner cities studies from Northeastern Illinois University and his master's degree in theology from University of Chicago. He served as a Methodist minister and was a business owner. From 1993 to 2001, Pugh served in the Illinois House of Representatives and was a Democrat.
