= Myron Kulas =

American politician

Member of the Illinois House of Representatives
- In office 1979–1993
- Preceded by: Michael L. Narduli
- Succeeded by: Rod Blagojevich
- Constituency: 10th district (1979-1983); 19th district (1983-1993)

Personal details
- Born: October 9, 1942 (age 83) Jarosław, Ukraine
- Party: Democratic
- Spouse: Lilia
- Education: Loyola University
- Occupation: Businessman

Myron J. Kulas (born October 9, 1942) is an American politician from the state of Illinois. Kulas was a Democratic member of the Illinois House of Representatives from 1979 to 1993.

== Biography ==
Myron J. Kulas was born October 9, 1942, in Jaroslaw, Ukraine. His family emigrated to the United States in 1949 and settled in Chicago in 1950. Kulas earned a Bachelor of Science in business administration from Loyola University.

Kulas served as chairman of the House Energy and Environment for eight years. Future Governor Rod Blagojevich defeated Kulas in the 1992 Democratic primary by approximately 4,000 votes.

By 1995, Kulas had moved to La Grange, Illinois.

He was heavily involved as a member of the Ukrainian American community including memberships in the Ukrainian Congress Committee of America, American Ukrainian Youth Association, Ukrainian-American Democratic Organization; Ukrainian National Association, and the Chicago Ukrainian Businessmen and Professionals Association. Kulas was in the United States Army Reserve and had received an honorable discharge by 1983.
