= Nicholas Zagone =

American lawyer and politician (1931–2020)

Member of the Illinois House of Representatives

Personal details
- Party: Democratic

Nicholas S. Zagone (February 8, 1931 – September 11, 2020) was an American lawyer and politician.

Zagone was born in Chicago, Illinois. He went to St. Alphonsus Elementary School, DePaul Academy, and Wilbur Wright College. He graduated from UIC John Marshall Law School and was admitted to the Illinois bar in 1954. Zagone practiced law in Chicago. He served in the United States Army in the operations and intelligence section. Zagone served in the Illinois House of Representatives from 1959 to 1961 and from 1963 to 1967 and was a Democrat. Zagone served as a director of the Illinois Tollway Authority. He also served as an Illinois Associate and an Illinois Circuit Court Judge.
