= Art Turner =

American politician

Member of the Illinois House of Representatives from the 9th district
- In office December 2010 – July 3, 2020
- Preceded by: Arthur Turner
- Succeeded by: Lakesia Collins

Personal details
- Born: July 17, 1982 (age 43) Chicago, Illinois, U.S.
- Party: Democratic
- Education: Morehouse College (BA); Southern Illinois University (JD)
- Profession: Full Time Legislator

Art Turner (born July 17, 1982) is a Democratic member of the Illinois House of Representatives who serves as a representative for the 9th district. The district he represents includes part of the community areas of the Near West Side, the Near North Side and North Lawndale.

In 2019, Turner would not seek re-election as state representative and would later resign on July 3, 2020.

== Electoral history ==
Illinois 9th State House District Democratic Primary, 2010
Party	Candidate	Votes	%
Democratic	Arthur Turner	4,580	43.69
Democratic	John Burros	2,110	20.13
Democratic	Dorothy L. Watson	1,588	15.15
Democratic	Keith L. Jackson	1,399	13.35
Democratic	Bruce L. Jackson	460	4.39
Democratic	Jerry L. Patton	346	3.30
Total votes		10,483	100.0

Illinois 9th State House District General Election, 2010
Party	Candidate	Votes	%
Democratic	Arthur Turner	19,427	100.0
Total votes		19,427	100.0

Illinois 9th State House District General Election, 2012
Party	Candidate	Votes	%
Democratic	Arthur Turner (incumbent)	33,967	100.0
Total votes		33,967	100.0

Illinois 9th State House District General Election, 2014
Party	Candidate	Votes	%
Democratic	Arthur Turner (incumbent)	20,890	100.0
Total votes		20,890	100.0

Illinois 9th State House District General Election, 2016
Party	Candidate	Votes	%
Democratic	Arthur Turner (incumbent)	36,765	100.0
Total votes		36,765	100.0

Illinois 9th State House District General Election, 2018
Party	Candidate	Votes	%
Democratic	Arthur Turner (incumbent)	30,951	100.0
Total votes		30,951	100.0
