= Eddie Winters =

American politician

Eddie Winters is an American police officer and politician.

Winters received his bachelor's degree in professional studies/business administration from Roosevelt University. He served in the Chicago Police Department for eighteen years. From September 2012 to January 2013, Winters served in the Illinois House of Representatives and was a Democrat. He was appointed to the Illinois General Assembly after the incumbent Derrick Smith was expelled from the Illinois General Assembly after being convicted of bribery.

In 2017, while on duty, Winters was shot at, but suffered no injuries. As of 2018, Winters was a student at the University of Chicago working towards a Master of Science in Threat and Response Management.
