= Same-sex marriage in Illinois =

Same-sex marriage has been legally recognized in Illinois since a law signed by Governor Pat Quinn on November 20, 2013 took effect on June 1, 2014. Same-sex marriage legislation was introduced in successive sessions of the Illinois General Assembly from 2007 to 2013. It passed the Senate in February 2013, but legislators delayed a vote in the House of Representatives while lobbying for votes until November 5, when the House passed an amended version of the bill by a narrow margin. The Senate quickly approved the amended bill, and Governor Quinn signed it into law on November 20. The law went into effect on June 1, 2014, with same-sex couples able to apply for marriage licenses and then marry after the mandatory one-day waiting period. Illinois was the nineteenth U.S. state to legalize same-sex marriage. Illinois also established civil unions on June 1, 2011, after Governor Quinn signed legislation on January 31, 2011. The law allows both same-sex and opposite-sex couples to form civil unions and provides state recognition of substantially similar legal relationships, including same-sex marriages and civil unions, entered into in other jurisdictions.

On February 21, 2014, a U.S. District Court judge ruled in Lee v. Orr that same-sex couples in Cook County could marry immediately and need not wait for the law to take effect on June 1. On February 26, 2014, Champaign County clerk officials, citing the Lee ruling, began issuing marriage licenses to same-sex couples. An opinion by the Illinois Attorney General on March 4 announced that the ruling could apply to any county clerk who chose to issue marriage licenses to same-sex couples. Eight counties were issuing licenses by March 12: Cass, Champaign, Cook, Grundy, Jackson, Macon, McLean, and St. Clair. By April 15, that number had grown to 16 counties.

== Background ==
On October 20, 1975, Nancy Davis and Toby Schneiter requested a marriage license in Cook County. The marriage bureau refused, and the couple subsequently staged a sit-in and a hunger strike. After attempts by deputies to remove them, the couple were arrested and put in the county lock-up overnight. The next morning, instead of showing up for their court appearance, they went back to the marriage bureau for another sit-in. This time, they were jailed for a week, during which they continued their hunger strike. By summer 1976, the couple had spent more than 120 days in jail. They were sentenced to a year in prison, but only served 6 months in the Cook County Jail. In 1989, a couple from Chicago, Rex Wockner and Paul Varnell, filed a complaint with the Illinois Department of Human Rights, alleging that the state discriminated on the basis of sex because it refused to allow same-sex marriages. On February 14, 1990, Buddy Bell and Dale Fecker applied for and were denied a marriage license in Cook County. The couple, along with others, protested and were arrested. The Cook County State's Attorney indicated it was not going to prosecute, and the judge had the arrests stricken.

In 1996, because Hawaii seemed poised to legalize same-sex marriage in Baehr v. Miike, the Illinois Marriage and Dissolution of Marriage Act was amended to prohibit marriage between two individuals of the same sex, and state that "marriage between 2 individuals of the same sex is contrary to the public policy of this State". This was repealed in 2014. Attempts to add language banning same-sex marriage to the Illinois Constitution have not been successful.

== Civil unions ==
=== Introduction and passage ===
Representative Greg Harris introduced the Illinois Religious Freedom Protection and Civil Unions Bill to the Illinois General Assembly on February 23, 2007. It aimed to make the creation, benefits, and dissolution of civil unions essentially identical to marriage. The bill was not brought to a vote before the House of Representatives. On February 18, 2009, Harris re-introduced the civil union bill, which was reported out of committee following a 4–3 vote along party lines, with Democrats in support and Republicans opposed, but died on the floor. Instead of proceeding with that bill, the Youth and Family Committee substituted its language in a bill already before the committee on May 26, 2009. On November 30, 2010, the House of Representatives passed the bill by a vote of 61–52. The Senate approved it on December 1 by a vote of 32–24. Governor Pat Quinn signed the legislation on January 31, 2011, and it went into effect on June 1, 2011.

Following Governor Quinn's signature of the 2013 law that legalized same-sex marriage in Illinois, civil unions remain in effect and available for both opposite-sex and same-sex couples. Couples who wanted to convert their civil unions to marriages could do so, with or without performing a new ceremony, for up to one year from the date that the marriage law took effect (i.e. until June 1, 2015). Those couples were exempt from paying a fee, and the date of the marriage was recorded as the date of the original civil union. Couples who waited longer than one year have to perform a new ceremony and pay a fee.

=== Statistics ===
About 3,700 civil union licenses were issued in Illinois from June to December 2011. Of these, 1,856 (about 50.2%) were performed in Cook County, of which 138 were between heterosexual couples.

== Same-sex marriage ==
Same-sex marriage in the United States

=== Introduction and passage ===
On February 22, 2007, Representative Greg Harris introduced the Religious Freedom and Marriage Fairness Bill to the House of Representatives, which would have provided for same-sex marriage in the state. The bill died in committee. On January 14, 2009, Harris reintroduced the bill in the new session, but it once again died in committee. In October that year, Senator Heather Steans introduced the Equal Marriage Bill, the first same-sex marriage bill filed in the Senate, but it too died in committee. In February 2012, Harris introduced his bill again. On December 13, Harris and Steans announced plans for the General Assembly to consider the legislation before it dissolved early in January 2013. On January 2, 2013, at the end of the 97th General Assembly, Steans re-introduced her bill as an amendment to an unrelated Senate bill. After a legislative misstep, she again introduced the legislation as an amendment, this time to a House bill. The Senate Executive Committee approved the amendment on January 3, sending it to the Senate for a floor vote, but the bill fell with the beginning of the 98th General Assembly on January 9.

Steans and Harris filed new bills on January 9, (Note: Steans introduced a shell bill, Senate Bill 10, on January 9 with the intention of filing a substitute amendment replacing it with the text of the marriage bill, which she did on February 5. She filed another marriage bill, Senate Bill 110, on January 23.) and 10, respectively. Steans' bill (Senate Bill 10) was approved by the Senate Executive Committee on February 5. On February 14, the Senate approved the bill in a 34–21 vote. Governor Pat Quinn said he would sign the bill into law if the House of Representatives also passed it. On February 26, the Illinois House Executive Committee approved the bill by a 6–5 vote. Harris, anticipating its defeat, did not call for a vote before the General Assembly adjourned on May 31, but instead extended the deadline for its approval until August 31, allowing for it to be considered by a special session if Governor Quinn identified it for consideration should he call the Assembly into special session as expected. A special session was held on pension reform; the same-sex marriage bill, however, was not included. Instead, LGBT organizations and the bill's sponsors focused instead on increasing support for the legislation, with the goal of holding a vote in the October and November veto session of the Assembly. The House of Representatives passed the bill legalizing same-sex marriage by a 61–54 vote on November 5, 2013, narrowly achieving the 60-vote threshold. The Senate quickly approved the amended bill by a 32–21 vote margin, and Governor Quinn signed it into law on November 20. The law went into effect on June 1, 2014, enabling same-sex couples to request marriage licenses on that date and perform ceremonies after the mandatory one-day waiting period, although a court allowed a same-sex couple to be married on November 27, 2013.

November 5, 2013 vote in the House of Representatives
| Political affiliation | Voted for | Voted against | Abstained | Absent (Did not vote) |
|---|---|---|---|---|
| Democratic Party | 58: Edward Acevedo; Jaime Andrade Jr.; Luis Arroyo; Maria Antonia Berrios; Daniel Burke; Kelly Burke; Kelly Cassidy; Deb Conroy; Fred Crespo; Barbara Flynn Currie; John D'Amico; Will Davis; Anthony DeLuca; Scott Drury; Kenneth Dunkin; Paul Evans; Keith Farnham; Sara Feigenholtz; Laura Fine; La Shawn Ford; Jack Franks; Robyn Gabel; Esther Golar; Jehan Gordon-Booth; Greg Harris; Elizabeth Hernandez; Jay Hoffman; Frances Ann Hurley; Naomi Jakobsson; Thaddeus Jones; Stephanie Kifowit; Lou Lang; Linda Chapa LaVia; Camille Lilly; Mike Madigan; Natalie Manley; Robert Martwick; Emily McAsey; Christian Mitchell; Marty Moylan; Michelle Mussman; Elaine Nekritz; Al Riley; Robert Rita; Carol Sente; Elgie Sims; Mike Smiddy; Cynthia Soto; Silvana Tabares; Andre Thapedi; Art Turner; Patrick Verschoore; Lawrence Walsh Jr.; Chris Welch; Ann Williams; Kathleen Willis; Sam Yingling; Michael Zalewski | 11: Daniel Beiser; John Bradley; Kate Cloonen; Jerry Costello II; Monique Davis; Mary Flowers; Eddie Lee Jackson; Charles Jefferson; Frank Mautino; Brandon Phelps; Sue Scherer | 2: Rita Mayfield; Michael Smith | – |
| Republican Party | 3: Tom Cross; Ron Sandack; Ed Sullivan Jr. | 43: John Anthony; Patricia Bellock; Mike Bost; Dan Brady; Rich Brauer; Adam Brown; John Cabello; John Cavaletto; Christopher Davidsmeyer; Tom Demmer; Jim Durkin; Brad Halbrook; Norine Hammond; Josh Harms; David Harris; Kay Hatcher; Chad Hays; Jeanne Ives; Dwight Kay; Renée Kosel; David Leitch; Michael McAuliffe; David McSweeney; Charles Meier; Bill Mitchell; Donald Moffitt; Tom Morrison; JoAnn Osmond; Sandra Pihos; Raymond Poe; Robert Pritchard; Dennis Reboletti; David Reis; Wayne Rosenthal; Timothy Schmitz; Darlene Senger; Keith Sommer; Joe Sosnowski; Brian Stewart; Jil Tracy; Michael Tryon; Michael Unes; Barbara Wheeler | – | 1: Mike Fortner |
| Total | 61 | 54 | 2 | 1 |
| Total | 51.7% | 45.8% | 1.7% | 0.8% |

November 5, 2013 vote in the Senate
| Political affiliation | Voted for | Voted against | Abstained | Absent (Did not vote) |
|---|---|---|---|---|
| Democratic Party | 31: Jennifer Bertino-Tarrant; Daniel Biss; Melinda Bush; Jacqueline Collins; Tom Cullerton; William Cunningham; Mike Frerichs; Don Harmon; Michael Hastings; Linda Holmes; Mattie Hunter; Toi Hutchinson; Mike Jacobs; Emil Jones III; Dave Koehler; Dan Kotowski; Steven Landek; Kimberly Lightford; Terry Link; Andy Manar; Iris Martinez; Pat McGuire; Julie Morrison; John Mulroe; Antonio Munoz; Michael Noland; Kwame Raoul; Martin Sandoval; Steve Stadelman; Heather Steans; Donne Trotter | 4: James Clayborne Jr.; Gary Forby; William Haine; John Sullivan | 5: John Cullerton; William Delgado; Napoleon Harris; Ira Silverstein; Patricia Van Pelt | – |
| Republican Party | 1: Jason Barickman | 17: Tim Bivins; Bill Brady; Michael Connelly; Kirk Dillard; Dan Duffy; Darin LaHood; David Luechtefeld; Sam McCann; Kyle McCarter; Karen McConnaughay; Matt Murphy; Jim Oberweis; Christine Radogno; Sue Rezin; Dale Righter; Chapin Rose; Dave Syverson | 1: Pamela Althoff | – |
| Total | 32 | 21 | 6 | 0 |
| Total | 54.2% | 35.6% | 10.2% | 0.0% |

Illinois marriage statutes now read:

A marriage between 2 persons licensed, solemnized and registered as provided in this Act is valid in this State. [750 ILCS 5/201]

In May 2023, the Illinois Legislature passed a bill repealing a section of the marriage statutes that made it illegal for residents of jurisdictions where same-sex marriage is not recognized from marrying in Illinois. Governor J. B. Pritzker signed the bill into law on June 9, 2023. Senator Mike Simmons, a sponsor of the legislation, said, "What we're trying to do is get ahead of any actions that might be taken to invalidate Obergefell or any of those other cases that would have a direct and disastrous impact on LGBTQ households in the country", referencing Obergefell v. Hodges, the U.S. Supreme Court case that legalized same-sex marriage nationwide.

=== Reactions and commentary ===
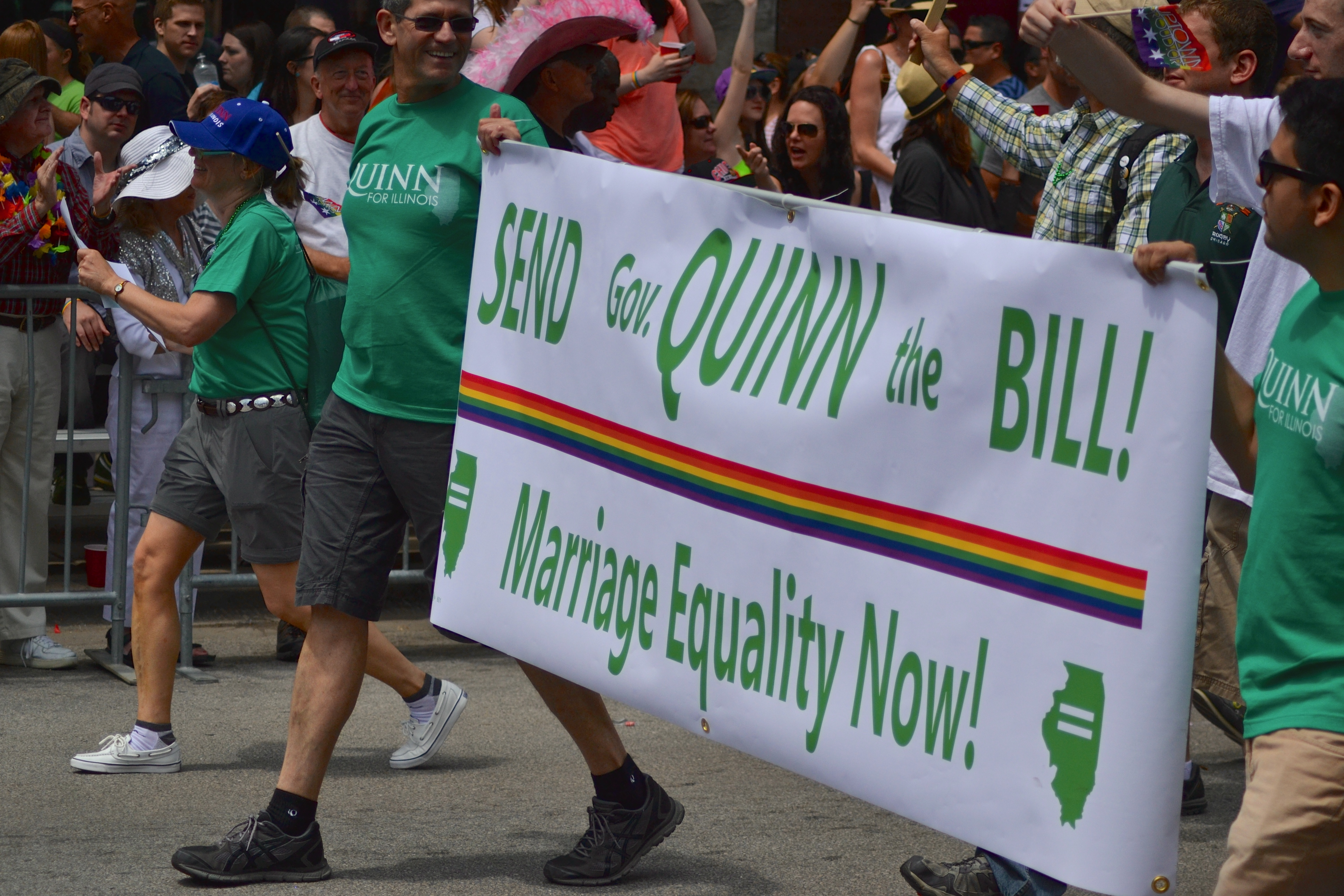
Activists urging the General Assembly to pass same-sex marriage legislation, June 2013

In February 2012, the Mayor of Chicago, Rahm Emanuel, announced that he would work for the passage of a same-sex marriage bill. Governor Quinn said he was looking forward to building a majority for the legislation, and reiterated his support for same-sex marriage on May 11, 2012. A spokesman for the Catholic Conference of Illinois reiterated its opposition and said he was unaware of any legislators whose positions had changed. Another opponent, Senator Tim Bivins, noted that in comparable lame-duck legislative sessions, Governor Quinn had rewarded legislators who changed their votes with positions in his administration. On December 29, a spokesman for President Barack Obama reported his endorsement of the legislation: "While the president does not weigh in on every measure being considered by state legislatures, he believes in treating everyone fairly and equally, with dignity and respect. As he has said, his personal view is that it's wrong to prevent couples who are in loving, committed relationships, and want to marry, from doing so. Were the President still in the Illinois State Legislature, he would support this measure that would treat all Illinois couples equally."

On January 1, 2013, the Archbishop of Chicago, Francis George, in a letter to Roman Catholic parishioners, wrote that enacting same-sex marriage was "acting against the common good of society", adding, "The state has no power to create something that nature itself tells us is impossible." For several weeks, the Chairman of the Illinois Republican Party, Pat Brady, lobbied legislators to support the legislation, calling it "an issue of equality and we're the party of Lincoln", but other party leaders called for his resignation. On January 10, United Methodist Bishop Sally Dyck endorsed the legislation, saying that "[m]arriage equality is a civil rights issue", even though her church forbids her from celebrating such marriages. A group of business leaders, including representatives of Google, Orbitz, and Morningstar, Inc., on January 13 asked legislators to consider the economic advantages of enacting same-sex marriage, noting that "human capital drives innovation and growth" and "[m]arriage equality would strengthen the workforces of Illinois employers".

On November 5, President Obama tweeted, "This is huge...the Illinois House just passed marriage equality." The White House also released a statement by the President stating: "As President, I have always believed that gay and lesbian Americans should be treated fairly and equally under the law. Over time, I also came to believe that same-sex couples should be able to get married like anyone else. So tonight, Michelle and I are overjoyed for all the committed couples in Illinois whose love will now be as legal as ours – and for their friends and family who have long wanted nothing more than to see their loved ones treated fairly and equally under the law." Mayor Emanuel tweeted his reaction: "With one vote, countless couples will be acknowledged for what they are under the law – families just like everyone else. Great day!" Bishop Larry Trotter of the Sweet Holy Spirit Church in Chicago, who helped lead opposition to the bill, applauded legislators "who stood up for God. Regardless of the passage of SB10, we will always believe that marriage is between one man and one woman", Trotter said. "Yet we will still love the members of the LGBT community. We pray God's Grace, Mercy and Blessings over the state of Illinois and the United States of America."

=== Lawsuits ===
==== Early cases ====
On May 30, 2012, both Lambda Legal and the American Civil Liberties Union announced lawsuits in state court, Darby v. Orr and Lazaro v. Orr, challenging the refusal of the Cook County Clerk, David Orr, to issue marriage licenses to same-sex couples. Both contended that the Illinois Marriage and Dissolution of Marriage Act violated the Illinois Constitution's guarantees of equal protection and due process. The Illinois Attorney General, Lisa Madigan, announced the next day that her office would support the lawsuits, and Orr supported same-sex marriage. The Cook County State's Attorney, Anita Alvarez, had also conceded that the state's ban on same-sex marriages was probably unconstitutional. On July 3, the Chancery Division of the Circuit Court of Cook County approved the request of two county clerks from other parts of the state, represented by the Thomas More Society, a conservative legal group, to intervene to defend the act. On November 30, it denied requests by the Church of Christian Liberty, the Grace Gospel Fellowship and the Illinois Family Institute, opponents of same-sex marriage, to be allowed to intervene to defend the law. In July 2013, following the U.S. Supreme Court's decision in United States v. Windsor, the plaintiffs in both cases filed motions for summary judgment, asking for a swift ruling in favor of same-sex marriage. Circuit Judge Sophia Hall heard arguments on August 6, and rejected a motion to dismiss on September 27. Both cases were dismissed on December 17.

In November 2013, Judge Thomas M. Durkin ordered that a lesbian couple, long-time activist and civil servant Vernita Gray and her partner Patricia Ewert, be allowed to marry because Gray was terminally ill.

==== Lee v. Orr ====
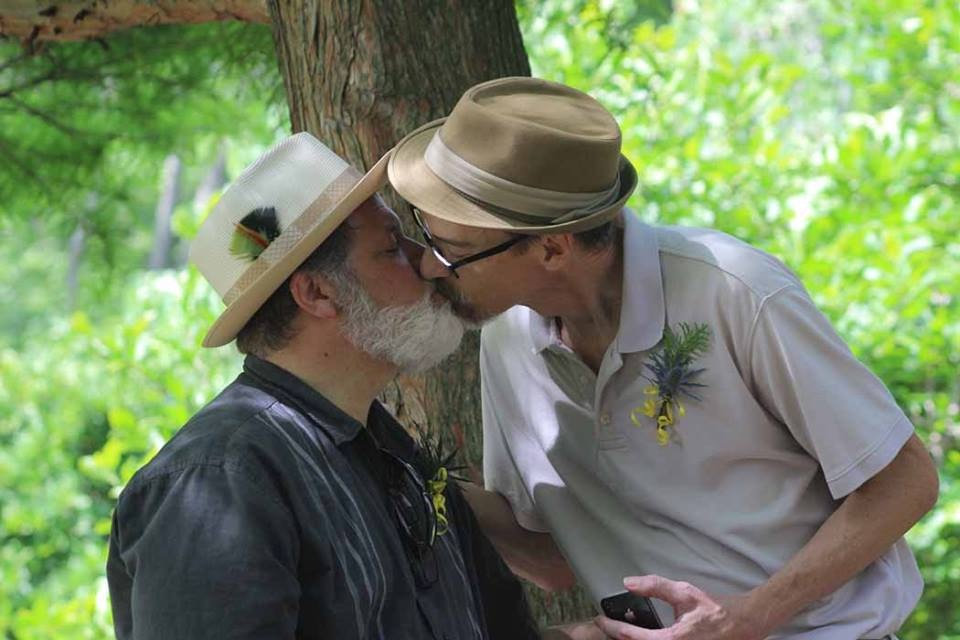
A married same-sex couple in Illinois, 2014

On December 6, 2013, four same-sex couples filed a lawsuit, Lee v. Orr, in the U.S. District Court for the Northern District of Illinois seeking the right to marry without waiting for the same-sex marriage law to take effect on June 1, 2014. Two of the couples included a partner suffering from a serious illness. On December 10, Judge Sharon Johnson Coleman ruled that any same-sex couple could marry if one of the partners was terminally ill. On February 21, 2014, she ruled that same-sex couples could immediately begin marrying in Cook County without waiting for the state statute legalizing same-sex marriage to take effect on June 1. Orr announced that his office would accept applications for marriage licenses immediately. His office fulfilled 46 requests for marriage licenses from same-sex couples that day. On February 26, Champaign County officials, citing the ruling in Lee, also began issuing licenses to same-sex couples, and Grundy County followed suit on February 27.

The Macon County clerk asked the Attorney General if he could issue licenses to same-sex couples. In response, on March 4, Attorney General Madigan issued an opinion that the Lee decision did not require county clerks to do so, but that lawsuits similar to Lee would produce the same result. She left the decision to the individual county clerks but made her own interpretation clear: "the Lee decision, along with the federal court decisions noted above, should be persuasive as you evaluate whether to issue marriage licenses to same-sex couples". Governor Quinn said the Illinois Department of Public Health would record marriages issued by any county clerk. LGBT advocates said that Madigan's statement "green light[ed]" county clerks to issue the licenses. St. Clair County began issuing licenses to same-sex couples the next day, and officials in Cass and Jackson counties said they would do so too. This made Jackson County the first county south of the St. Louis metro area to issue marriage licenses to same-sex couples. Macon County announced it would issue licenses beginning on March 10, and officials in McLean County said their start date was March 24. Officials in Lake, DeKalb, Kane, DuPage, and McHenry counties said they would wait until June 1, the effective date of the state statute. How clerks in most counties would respond was not immediately clear, but Illinois couples were able to apply for marriage licenses from any county, and some couples who lived in other counties had obtained licenses in Cook County.

On April 15, Equality Illinois confirmed that same-sex couples could marry in 16 counties: Cass, Champaign, Clinton, Cook, DeKalb, Greene, Grundy, Hardin, Jackson, Macon, McLean, Ogle, Perry, St. Clair, Wabash, and Woodford.

== Demographics and marriage statistics ==
By April 18, 2016, more than 9,200 same-sex couples had received marriage licenses in Cook County (from February 2014), with projections that the number of marriage licenses issued to same-sex couples would reach over 10,000 by summer 2016. The 10,000th same-sex marriage license in Cook County was issued on August 31, 2016. In 2014, same-sex marriages accounted for approximately 17% of the total number of marriages performed in Cook County, though this dropped to 7% in 2015. From June 2014 to April 2016, Lake County issued a total of 382 marriage licenses to same-sex couples, while Kane County issued 360 licenses. Not all counties in Illinois record the number of marriage licenses issued to same-sex couples.

The 2020 U.S. census showed that there were 22,791 married same-sex couple households (11,471 male couples and 11,320 female couples) and 17,893 unmarried same-sex couple households in Illinois.

== Public opinion ==
Public opinion for same-sex marriage in Illinois
| Poll source | Dates administered | Sample size | Margin of error | Support | Opposition | Do not know / refused |
|---|---|---|---|---|---|---|
| Public Religion Research Institute | February 28 – December 8, 2025 | 704 adults | ? | 72% | 24% | 4% |
| Public Religion Research Institute | March 13 – December 2, 2024 | 711 adults | ? | 75% | 21% | 4% |
| Public Religion Research Institute | March 9 – December 7, 2023 | 757 adults | ? | 74% | 21% | 5% |
| Public Religion Research Institute | March 11 – December 14, 2022 | ? | ? | 77% | 20% | 3% |
| Public Religion Research Institute | March 8 – November 9, 2021 | ? | ? | 74% | 25% | 1% |
| Public Religion Research Institute | January 7 – December 20, 2020 | 1,577 adults | ? | 72% | 26% | 2% |
| Public Religion Research Institute | April 5 – December 23, 2017 | 2,452 adults | ? | 65% | 25% | 10% |
| Public Religion Research Institute | May 18, 2016 – January 10, 2017 | 3,587 adults | ? | 62% | 29% | 9% |
| Public Religion Research Institute | April 29, 2015 – January 7, 2016 | 2,936 adults | ? | 60% | 33% | 7% |
| Public Religion Research Institute | April 2, 2014 – January 4, 2015 | 1,822 adults | ? | 59% | 34% | 7% |
| New York Times/CBS News/YouGov | September 20 – October 1, 2014 | 3,955 likely voters | ± 1.9% | 55% | 33% | 14% |
| Public Religion Research Institute | November 12 – December 18, 2013 | 157 adults | ± 9.1% | 52% | 39% | 9% |
| Fako & Associates, Inc. | October 8–10, 2013 | 600 likely voters | ± 3.9% | 52% | 40% | 8% |
| Public Policy Crain/Ipsos Illinois | February 12–15, 2013 | 600 adults | ± 4.7% | 50% | 29% | 20% |
| Public Policy Polling | November 26–28, 2012 | 625 registered voters | ± 4.4% | 47% | 42% | 11% |
| Copley News Service | 2004 | 625 registered voters | ± 4.0% | 27% | 60% | 13% |

== See also ==
- LGBT rights in Illinois
- Same-sex marriage law in the United States by state
