= 98th Illinois General Assembly =

2013 to 2014 legislative session

←	97th	99th	→
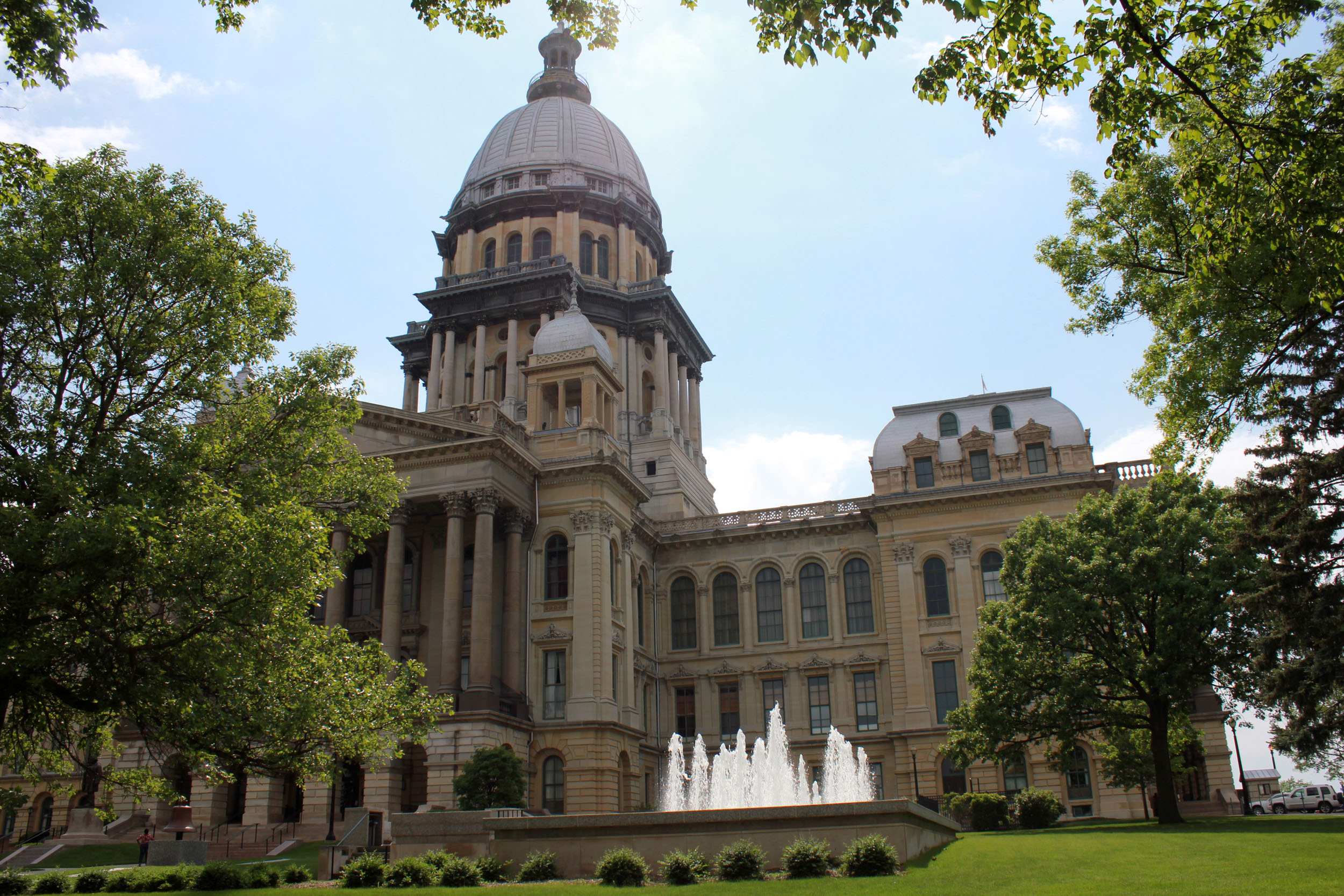
- The Illinois State Capitol in 2013

Overview
- Meeting place: Springfield, Illinois
- Term: 2013 – 2014
- Election: 2012
- Website: Official site

Illinois Senate
- President: John J. Cullerton, Democrat

Illinois House of Representatives
- Speaker: Michael J. Madigan, Democrat

The 98th Illinois General Assembly convened on January 9, 2013, and adjourned sine die on January 13, 2015. Elected in 2012, it was the first General Assembly to reflect the new legislative districts enacted by the previous 97th Illinois General Assembly in 2011, which shifted the map in the Democratic Party's favor.

== Legislation ==
The 98th General Assembly enacted a total of 1,175 bills into law. Notable among these was the Illinois Religious Freedom and Marriage Fairness Act, which removed legal barriers to same-sex marriage in Illinois. The House of Representatives passed the bill by a 61–54 vote on November 5, 2013, and the Senate passed it by a 32–21 vote. The governor signed the bill into law on November 20, and the law took effect on June 1, 2014.

The General Assembly also passed the Illinois Bill of Rights for the Homeless, which made Illinois the second state to ban discrimination against the homeless.

The General Assembly also passed the Firearm Concealed Carry Act (FCCA), a change to Illinois gun law that made Illinois the last state in the country to enact concealed carry. Passed over the governor's veto, the FCCA took effect "mere hours before the seventh circuit's deadline" in Moore v. Madigan.

Late in the legislative session, the General Assembly passed a bill that changes the original Illinois wiretapping law adding that in order to commit a criminal offense, a person must be recording "in a surreptitious manner". On December 30, 2014, Governor Quinn signed the bill into law as Public Act 098-1142. The bill's sponsors, Elaine Nekritz and Kwame Raoul, claimed the law upholds the rights of citizens to record in public.

The General Assembly approved five ballot measures for the 2014 Illinois general election, an unusually large number for the state, including three advisory referendums and two constitutional amendments. The constitutional amendments, Marsy's Law and the Illinois Right to Vote Amendment, both passed with the required 60% majority of the popular vote.

== Senate ==
Results of the 2012 Illinois Senate election

The members of the Senate were elected in the 2012 Illinois Senate election. Because this was the first election following the decennial redistricting, senators were elected from all 59 districts, with one-third of the Senate being elected to two-year terms while the others were elected to four-year terms.

=== Senate leadership ===
Position	Name	Party	District
President of the Senate	John J. Cullerton	Democratic	6
Majority Leader	James Clayborne	Democratic	57
Minority Leader	Christine Radogno	Republican	41

=== Party composition ===
The Senate of the 98th General Assembly consisted of 19 Republicans and 40 Democrats.

Affiliation	Members
Democratic Party	40
Republican Party	19
Total	59

=== State senators ===
District	Counties represented	Senator	Party	First year	Committees
1	Cook	Antonio Muñoz	Democratic	1999	Member: Energy, Executive, Executive Appointments (chair), Insurance
2	Cook	William Delgado	Democratic	1999	Member: Advisory Committee on Healthcare, Appropriations I, Education (chair), Executive Appointments, Human Services
3	Cook	Mattie Hunter	Democratic	2003	Member: Appropriations I, Executive, Human Services (chair), Legislative Petitions, Public Health
4	Cook	Kimberly A. Lightford	Democratic	1998	Member: Advisory Committee On Education Funding, Assignments, Education, Executive, Executive Appointments, Financial Institutions, Higher Education
5	Cook	Patricia Van Pelt	Democratic	2013	Member: Appropriations I, Criminal Law, Energy, Joint Criminal Justice Reform, Labor & Commerce, Public Health
6	Cook	John J. Cullerton	Democratic	1979	Member: Executive
7	Cook	Heather A. Steans	Democratic	2008	Member: Advisory Committee on Healthcare, Appropriations I (chair), Appropriations II, Environment, Executive, Public Health
8	Cook	Ira I. Silverstein	Democratic	1999	Member: Executive, Executive Appointments, Financial Institutions, Insurance, Judiciary
9	Cook	Daniel Biss	Democratic	2011	Member: Conference Committee on SB1, Education, Environment, Higher Education, Licensed Activities & Pensions, Local Government
10	Cook	John G. Mulroe	Democratic	2010	Member: Criminal Law, Insurance, Judiciary, Public Health (chair)
11	Cook	Martin A. Sandoval	Democratic	2003	Member: Energy, Licensed Activities & Pensions, Local Government, Transportation (chair)
12	Cook	Steven M. Landek	Democratic	2011	Member: Appropriations II, Labor & Commerce, Local Government, Revenue, State Government & Veterans Affairs (chair)
13	Cook	Kwame Raoul	Democratic	2004	Member: Conference Committee on SB1 (chair), Criminal Law, Insurance, Joint Criminal Justice Reform, Judiciary (chair), Labor & Commerce, Public Health, Public Pensions & State Investments (chair)
14	Cook	Emil Jones III	Democratic	2009	Member: Licensed Activities & Pensions, Local Government (chair), Revenue, Transportation
15	Cook, Will	Napoleon Harris III	Democratic	2013	Member: Appropriations II, Human Services, Labor & Commerce, Public Health, Transportation
16	Cook	Jacqueline Y. Collins	Democratic	2003	Member: Energy, Financial Institutions (chair), Insurance, Transportation
17	Cook, Kankakee, Will	Donne E. Trotter	Democratic	1988	Member: Advisory Committee on Healthcare, Appropriations I, Appropriations II, Energy, Executive
18	Cook	Bill Cunningham	Democratic	2011	Member: Criminal Law, Education, Human Services, Labor & Commerce
19	Cook, Will	Michael E. Hastings	Democratic	2013	Member: Appropriations II, Financial Institutions, Insurance, Judiciary, Legislative Petitions, State Government & Veterans Affairs
20	Cook	Iris Y. Martinez	Democratic	2003	Member: Education, Energy, Labor & Commerce, Licensed Activities & Pensions (chair), Public Pensions & State Investments
21	DuPage, Will	Michael Connelly	Republican	2009	Member: Advisory Committee on Healthcare, Appropriations I, Criminal Law, Human Services, Labor & Commerce, Licensed Activities & Pensions
22	Cook, Kane	Michael Noland	Democratic	2007	Member: Advisory Committee On Education Funding, Criminal Law (chair), Education, Energy, Joint Criminal Justice Reform Comm. (chair), Judiciary, Revenue
23	Cook, DuPage, Dupage	Thomas Cullerton	Democratic	2013	Member: Appropriations II, Labor & Commerce, Local Government, State Government & Veterans Affairs, Transportation
24	Cook, DuPage	Kirk W. Dillard	Republican	1993	
24	Cook, DuPage	Chris Nybo	Republican		Member: Energy, Executive Appointments, Judiciary, State Government & Veterans Affairs, Transportation
25	Cook, Dupage, Kane, Kendall	Jim Oberweis	Republican	2013	Member: Appropriations I, Environment, Labor & Commerce, Local Government, Public Health
26	Cook, Kane, Lake, McHenry	Dan Duffy	Republican	2009	Member: Environment, Human Services, Labor & Commerce, Public Pensions & State Investments, Revenue, Special Comm. on Watercraft Safety, State Government & Veterans Affairs
27	Cook	Matt Murphy	Republican	2007	Member: Appropriations I, Appropriations II, Conference Committee on SB1, Energy, Executive, Joint Criminal Justice Reform, Revenue
28	Cook, Dupage	Dan Kotowski	Democratic	2007	Member: Appropriations I, Appropriations II (chair), Criminal Law, Higher Education, Revenue
29	Cook, Lake	Julie A. Morrison	Democratic	2013	Member: Appropriations I, Education, Environment, Human Services, Special Comm. on Watercraft Safety (chair), State Government & Veterans Affairs
30	Cook, Lake	Terry Link	Democratic	1997	Member: Executive, Financial Institutions, Local Government, Special Comm. on Watercraft Safety, Transportation
31	Lake	Melinda Bush	Democratic	2013	Member: Advisory Committee On Education Funding, Appropriations II, Environment, Higher Education, Revenue, Special Comm. on Watercraft Safety, State Government & Veterans Affairs
32	Lake, McHenry	Pamela J. Althoff	Republican	2003	Member: Appropriations II, Assignments, Labor & Commerce, Licensed Activities & Pensions, Revenue, Special Comm. on Watercraft Safety, Transportation
33	Kane, McHenry	Karen McConnaughay	Republican	2013	Member: Advisory Committee On Education Funding, Appropriations II, Education, Energy, Financial Institutions, Legislative Petitions, Public Pensions & State Investments, Transportation
34	Winnebago	Steve Stadelman	Democratic	2013	Member: Appropriations II, Education, Human Services, State Government & Veterans Affairs, Transportation
35	Boone, DeKalb, Kane, Winnebago	Dave Syverson	Republican	1993	Member: Advisory Committee on Healthcare (chair), Environment, Executive, Human Services, Insurance, Public Health
36	Carroll, Henry, Rock Island, Whiteside	Mike Jacobs	Democratic	2005	Member: Agriculture & Conservation, Appropriations II, Energy (chair), Executive Appointments, Insurance
37	Bureau, Henry, Knox, LaSalle, Lee, Marshall, Mercer, Peoria, Stark, Woodford	Darin M. LaHood	Republican	2011	Member: Advisory Committee on Healthcare, Appropriations II, Insurance, Judiciary, Legislative Petitions, Licensed Activities & Pensions, Public Health
38	Bureau, Grundy, Kendall, LaSalle, Livingston, Putnam, Will	Sue Rezin	Republican	2010	Member: Advisory Committee On Education Funding, Education, Energy, Financial Institutions, Local Government, Public Pensions & State Investments (chair), Transportation
39	Cook, Dupage	Don Harmon	Democratic	2003	Member: Assignments, Executive (chair), Judiciary
40	Cook, Grundy, Kankakee, Will	Toi W. Hutchinson	Democratic	2009	Member: Judiciary, Labor & Commerce, Revenue (chair), Transportation
41	Cook, DuPage, Dupage, Will	Christine Radogno	Republican	1997	Member: Executive
42	DuPage, Kane, Kendall, Will	Linda Holmes	Democratic	2007	Member: Agriculture & Conservation, Conference Committee on SB1, Environment (chair), Labor & Commerce, Local Government
43	DuPage, Will	Pat McGuire	Democratic	2012	Member: Appropriations II, Environment, Higher Education, Revenue, Transportation
44	Logan, McLean, Menard, Sangamon, Tazewell	William E. Brady	Republican	1993	Member: Agriculture & Conservation, Conference Committee on SB1, Environment, Insurance, State Government & Veterans Affairs, Transportation
45	Carroll, Jo Daviess, DeKalb, LaSalle, Lee, Ogle, Stephenson, Whiteside, Winnebago	Tim Bivins	Republican	2008	Member: Criminal Law, Executive Appointments, Financial Institutions, Insurance, Licensed Activities & Pensions, Public Pensions & State Investments
46	Fulton, Peoria, Tazewell	David Koehler	Democratic	2006	Member: Advisory Committee on Healthcare (chair), Agriculture & Conservation (chair), Energy, Executive Appointments, Local Government, Transportation
47	Adams, Brown, Cass, Fulton, Hancock, Henderson, Knox, Mason, McDonough, Schuyler, Warren	John M. Sullivan	Democratic	2003	Member: Agriculture & Conservation, Financial Institutions, Higher Education, Revenue, Transportation
48	Christian, Macon, Macoupin, Madison, Montgomery, Sangamon	Andy Manar	Democratic	2013	Member: Advisory Committee On Education Funding (chair), Agriculture & Conservation, Appropriations I, Appropriations II, Executive Appointments, Higher Education, State Government & Veterans Affairs
49	Kendall, Will	Jennifer Bertino-Tarrant	Democratic	2013	Member: Education, Labor & Commerce, Local Government, State Government & Veterans Affairs, Transportation
50	Calhoun, Greene, Jersey, Macoupin, Madison, Morgan, Pike, Sangamon, Scott	Wm. Sam McCann	Republican	2011	Member: Agriculture & Conservation, Executive Appointments, Higher Education, Local Government, Transportation
51	Champaign, DeWitt, Douglas, Edgar, Macon, McLean, Moultrie, Piatt, Shelby, Vermilion	Chapin Rose	Republican	2003	Member: Appropriations II, Education, Energy, Higher Education, Insurance
52	Champaign, Vermilion	Scott M Bennett	Democratic		
52	Champaign, Vermilion	Michael W. Frerichs	Democratic	2007	Member: Agriculture & Conservation, Energy, Financial Institutions, Higher Education (chair), Licensed Activities & Pensions, Public Pensions & State Investments
53	Ford, Iroquois, Livingston, McLean, Vermilion, Woodford	Jason A. Barickman	Republican	2011	Member: Advisory Committee On Education Funding, Appropriations II, Education, Financial Institutions, Judiciary, State Government & Veterans Affairs
54	Bond, Clinton, Effingham, Fayette, Madison, Marion, St. Clair, Washington	Kyle McCarter	Republican	2009	Member: Agriculture & Conservation, Higher Education, Labor & Commerce, Local Government, Revenue
55	Clark, Clay, Coles, Crawford, Cumberland, Edgar, Edwards, Effingham, Jasper, Lawrence, Richland, Wabash, Wayne, White	Dale A. Righter	Republican	1998	Member: Advisory Committee on Healthcare, Appropriations I, Assignments, Criminal Law, Energy, Executive, Joint Criminal Justice Reform, Judiciary
56	Jersey, Madison, St. Clair	William R. Haine	Democratic	2002	Member: Criminal Law, Insurance (chair), Judiciary, Legislative Petitions (chair), Licensed Activities & Pensions
57	Madison, St. Clair	James F. Clayborne Jr.	Democratic	1995	Member: Assignments (chair), Energy, Executive, Executive Appointments, Insurance, Public Pensions & State Investments
58	Jackson, Jefferson, Monroe, Perry, Randolph, St. Clair, Union, Washington	David S. Luechtefeld	Republican	1995	Member: Advisory Committee On Education Funding (chair), Education, Executive, Executive Appointments, Higher Education, Local Government
59	Alexander, Franklin, Gallatin, Hamilton, Hardin, Jackson, Johnson, Massac, Pope, Pulaski, Saline, Union, Williamson	Gary Forby	Democratic	2001	Member: Energy, Labor & Commerce (chair), Licensed Activities & Pensions

== House ==
=== Party composition ===
The House of the 98th General Assembly consisted of 47 Republicans and 71 Democrats.

Affiliation	Members
Democratic Party	71
Republican Party	47
Total	118

=== House leadership ===
Position	Name	Party	District
Speaker of the House	Michael J. Madigan	Democratic	22
Majority Leader	Barbara Flynn Currie	Democratic	25
Minority Leader	Jim Durkin	Republican	82

=== State representatives ===
District	Counties represented	Representative	Party	First year	Committees
1	Cook	Daniel J. Burke	Democratic	1991	Member: Business Occupational Licenses, Executive (chair), Financial Institutions, International Trade & Commerce, Mass Transit, Personnel & Pensions
2	Cook	Edward J. Acevedo	Democratic	1997	Member: Appropriations-Elementary & Secondary Education, Biotechnology (chair), Energy, Executive, Financial Institutions
3	Cook	Luis Arroyo	Democratic	2006	Member: Appropriations-Public Safety (chair), Executive, Housing, Labor & Commerce, Public Utilities, Tollway Oversight
4	Cook	Cynthia Soto	Democratic	2001	Member: Appropriations-Elementary & Secondary Education, Appropriations-Higher Education, Energy (chair), Health Care Availability Access, Human Services
5	Cook	Kenneth Dunkin	Democratic	2002	Member: Appropriations-Higher Education (chair), Elementary & Secondary Education, Financial Institutions, Insurance, International Trade & Commerce, Joint Criminal Justice Reform Committee, Tourism & Conventions (chair)
6	Cook	Esther Golar	Democratic	2005	Member: Appropriations-Human Services, Elementary & Secondary Education, Housing (chair), Personnel & Pensions, Public Utilities
7	Cook	Emanuel Chris Welch	Democratic	2013	Member: Appropriations-Higher Education, Health Care Availability Access, Higher Education, Judiciary, Small Business Empowerment & Workforce, Transportation, Regulation, Roads
8	Cook	La Shawn K. Ford	Democratic	2007	Member: Appropriations-Human Services, Health Care Availability Access, Health Care Licenses, Restorative Justice (chair), Small Business Empowerment & Workforce (chair), Tollway Oversight, Veterans' Affairs
9	Cook	Arthur Turner	Democratic	2010	Member: Executive, Joint Criminal Justice Reform Committee, Judiciary, Revenue & Finance
10	Cook	Derrick Smith	Democratic	2011	Member: Appropriations-Public Safety, Consumer Protection, Housing, Human Services, Public Safety: Police & Fire, Tourism & Conventions
11	Cook	Ann Williams	Democratic	2011	Member: Adoption Reform, Biotechnology, Insurance, Judiciary, Labor & Commerce, Mass Transit
12	Cook	Sara Feigenholtz	Democratic	1995	Member: Adoption Reform (chair), Appropriations-Human Services, Public Utilities, Tourism & Conventions
13	Cook	Greg Harris	Democratic	2006	Member: Appropriations-Human Services (chair), Environment, Insurance, Restorative Justice, Tourism & Conventions
14	Cook	Kelly M. Cassidy	Democratic	2011	Member: Appropriations-Public Safety, Human Services, Labor & Commerce, Restorative Justice
15	Cook	John D'Amico	Democratic	2004	Member: Consumer Protection, Labor & Commerce, Transportation, Regulation, Roads, Transportation: Vehicles & Safety (chair), Veterans' Affairs
16	Cook	Lou Lang	Democratic	1987	Member: Insurance, Rules
17	Cook	Laura Fine	Democratic	2013	Member: Appropriations-Higher Education, Business Growth & Incentives, Consumer Protection, Health & Healthcare Disparities, Human Services, Insurance
18	Cook	Robyn Gabel	Democratic	2010	Member: Appropriations-Human Services, Business Growth & Incentives, Environment, Human Services (chair), Insurance, Mass Transit, Museums Arts & Cultural Enhancement
19	Cook	Robert F. Martwick	Democratic	2013	Member: Business Occupational Licenses, Economic Development, Human Services, Insurance, International Trade & Commerce, Public Safety: Police & Fire, Transportation: Vehicles & Safety
20	Cook	Michael P. McAuliffe	Republican	1996	Member: Appropriations-Public Safety, Health Care Availability Access, Health Care Licenses, Museums Arts & Cultural Enhancement, Public Utilities, Tourism & Conventions, Veterans' Affairs
21	Cook	Silvana Tabares	Democratic	2013	Member: Appropriations-Higher Education, Higher Education, Housing, Insurance, Small Business Empowerment & Workforce
22	Cook	Michael J. Madigan	Democratic	1971	
23	Cook	Michael J. Zalewski	Democratic	2008	Member: Appropriations-Public Safety, Environment, Health Care Licenses (chair), Joint Criminal Justice Reform Committee (chair), Judiciary, Personnel & Pensions, Revenue & Finance
24	Cook	Elizabeth Hernandez	Democratic	2007	Member: Appropriations-Elementary & Secondary Education, Appropriations-Human Services, Biotechnology, Business Growth & Incentives, Consumer Protection (chair), Higher Education, Labor & Commerce
25	Cook	Barbara Flynn Currie	Democratic	1979	Member: Revenue & Finance, Rules (chair)
26	Cook	Christian L. Mitchell	Democratic	2013	Member: Agriculture & Conservation, Energy, Health Care Availability Access, State Government Administration
27	Cook	Monique D. Davis	Democratic	1987	Member: Appropriations-General Service, Appropriations-Higher Education, Elementary & Secondary Education, Financial Institutions, Insurance (chair), State Government Administration
28	Cook	Robert Rita	Democratic	2003	Member: Appropriations-Public Safety, Business Occupational Licenses (chair), Consumer Protection, Executive, Insurance, Mass Transit, Tollway Oversight (chair)
29	Cook, Will	Thaddeus Jones	Democratic	2011	Member: Appropriations-Higher Education, Appropriations-Public Safety, Cities & Villages, Insurance, Labor & Commerce, Public Safety: Police & Fire
30	Cook	William Davis	Democratic	2003	Member: Appropriations-Elementary & Secondary Education (chair), Appropriations-Higher Education, Health & Healthcare Disparities (chair), International Trade & Commerce, Labor & Commerce, Mass Transit
31	Cook	Mary E. Flowers	Democratic	1985	Member: Accountability & Administrative Review, Health & Healthcare Disparities, Health Care Availability Access (chair), Higher Education, Human Services, Museums Arts & Cultural Enhancement, Restorative Justice
32	Cook	André M. Thapedi	Democratic	2009	Member: Financial Institutions, International Trade & Commerce (chair), Judiciary, Mass Transit, Public Utilities
33	Cook	Marcus C. Evans Jr.	Democratic	2012	Member: Agriculture & Conservation, Appropriations-General Service, Business Occupational Licenses, Consumer Protection, Elementary & Secondary Education, Revenue & Finance
34	Cook, Kankakee, Will	Elgie R. Sims Jr.	Democratic	2012	Member: Appropriations-Human Services, Business Growth & Incentives, Business Occupational Licenses, Insurance, Judiciary, Mass Transit
35	Cook	Frances Ann Hurley	Democratic	2013	Member: Appropriations-General Service, Cities & Villages, Health Care Licenses, Public Safety: Police & Fire, Transportation, Regulation, Roads
36	Cook	Kelly Burke	Democratic	2011	Member: Agriculture & Conservation, Appropriations-General Service, Appropriations-Higher Education, Health Care Licenses, Labor & Commerce, Museums Arts & Cultural Enhancement, Tollway Oversight
37	Cook, Will	Renée Kosel	Republican	1997	
37	Cook, Will	Margo McDermed	Republican	2015	
38	Cook, Will	Al Riley	Democratic	2007	Member: Appropriations-General Service, Cities & Villages, Counties & Townships, Mass Transit (chair)
39	Cook	Maria Antonia Berrios	Democratic	2003	Member: Biotechnology, Executive, Financial Institutions (chair), Insurance, International Trade & Commerce, Mass Transit, Tollway Oversight, Tourism & Conventions
40	Cook	Jaime M. Andrade Jr.	Democratic	2013	Member: Economic Development, Health Care Availability Access, Housing, International Trade & Commerce, Mass Transit, Public Safety: Police & Fire, State Government Administration, Transportation: Vehicles & Safety
40	Cook	Deborah Mell	Democratic	2009	
41	DuPage, Will	Darlene J. Senger	Republican	2009	Member: Appropriations-Elementary & Secondary Education, Appropriations-General Service, Business Growth & Incentives, Financial Institutions, Insurance, Personnel & Pensions
42	DuPage	Jeanne M Ives	Republican	2013	Member: Appropriations-Elementary & Secondary Education, Biotechnology, Cities & Villages, International Trade & Commerce, Labor & Commerce, Mass Transit
43	Cook, Kane	Keith Farnham	Democratic	2009	
43	Cook, Kane	Anna Moeller	Democratic	2014	Member: Economic Development, Public Safety: Police & Fire, State Government Administration, Transportation: Vehicles & Safety
44	Cook	Fred Crespo	Democratic	2007	Member: Accountability & Administrative Review, Appropriations-General Service (chair), Business Growth & Incentives, Elementary & Secondary Education, Mass Transit, Public Utilities, State Government Administration
45	Cook, Dupage	Dennis M. Reboletti	Republican	2007	Member: Health Care Availability Access, Joint Criminal Justice Reform Committee, Judiciary, Mass Transit, Public Utilities, Restorative Justice, Transportation, Regulation, Roads
46	DuPage	Deborah Conroy	Democratic	2013	Member: Cities & Villages, Economic Development, Higher Education, Museums Arts & Cultural Enhancement, Tourism & Conventions
47	Cook, DuPage	Patricia R. Bellock	Republican	1999	Member: Appropriations-Human Services, Labor & Commerce, Mass Transit
48	DuPage	Sandra M. Pihos	Republican	2003	Member: Accountability & Administrative Review, Appropriations-Elementary & Secondary Education, Consumer Protection, Elementary & Secondary Education, Housing, Small Business Empowerment & Workforce, Tollway Oversight
49	Cook, Dupage, Kane	Mike Fortner	Republican	2007	Member: Biotechnology, Cities & Villages, Energy, Mass Transit, Tollway Oversight, Transportation, Regulation, Roads
50	Kane, Kendall	Kay Hatcher	Republican	2009	Member: Accountability & Administrative Review, Appropriations-General Service, Health Care Availability Access, Human Services, Public Utilities, Tourism & Conventions, Transportation: Vehicles & Safety, Veterans' Affairs
51	Cook, Lake	Ed Sullivan Jr.	Republican	2003	Member: Appropriations-General Service, Consumer Protection, Executive, Mass Transit, Public Utilities, Revenue & Finance, Rules
52	Cook, Kane, Lake, McHenry	David McSweeney	Republican	2013	Member: Appropriations-Elementary & Secondary Education, Environment, Personnel & Pensions, Revenue & Finance, State Government Administration, Tollway Oversight
53	Cook	David Harris	Republican	1983	Member: Appropriations-General Service, Financial Institutions, Mass Transit, Revenue & Finance, State Government Administration, Transportation: Vehicles & Safety
54	Cook	Thomas Morrison	Republican	2011	Member: Appropriations-General Service, Business Occupational Licenses, Environment, Insurance, Personnel & Pensions
55	Cook	Martin J. Moylan	Democratic	2013	Member: Cities & Villages, Economic Development, Transportation, Regulation, Roads, Transportation: Vehicles & Safety
56	Cook, Dupage	Michelle Mussman	Democratic	2011	Member: Accountability & Administrative Review, Appropriations-Elementary & Secondary Education, Appropriations-Human Services, Biotechnology, Energy, Human Services, State Government Administration
57	Cook, Lake	Elaine Nekritz	Democratic	2003	Member: Environment, Judiciary (chair), Personnel & Pensions (chair)
58	Cook, Lake	Scott Drury	Democratic	2013	Member: Appropriations-Human Services, Higher Education, Insurance, Judiciary, Personnel & Pensions, Tollway Oversight
59	Cook, Lake	Carol A. Sente	Democratic	2009	Member: Appropriations-Elementary & Secondary Education, Business Growth & Incentives (chair), Environment, Personnel & Pensions, State Government Administration, Veterans' Affairs
60	Lake	Rita Mayfield	Democratic	2010	Member: Accountability & Administrative Review, Appropriations-Human Services, Biotechnology, Consumer Protection, Elementary & Secondary Education, Energy, Public Safety: Police & Fire (chair), Public Utilities, Transportation: Vehicles & Safety
61	Lake	Sheri L Jesiel	Republican	2014	Member: Appropriations-Public Safety, Human Services, Insurance, Public Safety: Police & Fire, Tourism & Conventions, Veterans' Affairs
61	Lake	JoAnn D. Osmond	Republican	2002	
62	Lake	Sam Yingling	Democratic	2013	Member: Appropriations-General Service, Economic Development, State Government Administration, Tollway Oversight, Transportation, Regulation, Roads
63	McHenry	Jack D. Franks	Democratic	1999	Member: Accountability & Administrative Review, Biotechnology, Business Growth & Incentives, International Trade & Commerce, Public Utilities, State Government Administration (chair), Veterans' Affairs
64	Lake, McHenry	Barbara Wheeler	Republican	2013	Member: Adoption Reform, Appropriations-Human Services, Elementary & Secondary Education, International Trade & Commerce, Mass Transit, Museums Arts & Cultural Enhancement, State Government Administration, Transportation, Regulation, Roads
65	Kane, McHenry	Steven A. Andersson	Republican	2015	
65	Kane, McHenry	Timothy L. Schmitz	Republican	1999	
66	Kane, McHenry	Michael W. Tryon	Republican	2005	Member: Appropriations-Public Safety, Business Growth & Incentives, Energy, Environment, Executive, Mass Transit
67	Winnebago	Charles E. Jefferson	Democratic	2001	
67	Winnebago	Litesa E. Wallace	Democratic	2014	
68	Winnebago	John M. Cabello	Republican	2012	Member: Appropriations-Public Safety, Consumer Protection, Human Services, Public Safety: Police & Fire, Public Utilities, Restorative Justice, State Government Administration
69	Boone, Winnebago	Joe Sosnowski	Republican	2011	Member: Appropriations-Elementary & Secondary Education, Appropriations-Higher Education, Business Growth & Incentives, Cities & Villages, Executive, Labor & Commerce, Revenue & Finance
70	Boone, DeKalb, Kane	Robert W. Pritchard	Republican	2003	Member: Appropriations-Elementary & Secondary Education, Appropriations-Higher Education, Business Growth & Incentives, Elementary & Secondary Education, Higher Education, Public Safety: Police & Fire, State Government Administration, Veterans' Affairs
71	Carroll, Henry, Rock Island, Whiteside	Mike Smiddy	Democratic	2013	Member: Appropriations-Higher Education, Energy, Public Safety: Police & Fire, Small Business Empowerment & Workforce, Transportation, Regulation, Roads
72	Rock Island	Patrick J. Verschoore	Democratic	2003	Member: Agriculture & Conservation (chair), Appropriations-Public Safety, Counties & Townships, Environment, Health Care Licenses, Public Safety: Police & Fire, Veterans' Affairs
73	Bureau, LaSalle, Marshall, Peoria, Stark, Woodford	David R. Leitch	Republican	1986	Member: Accountability & Administrative Review, Appropriations-Human Services, Financial Institutions, Housing, Labor & Commerce, Rules
74	Bureau, Henry, Knox, Lee, Mercer	Donald L. Moffitt	Republican	1993	Member: Agriculture & Conservation, Appropriations-Public Safety, Counties & Townships, Elementary & Secondary Education, Museums Arts & Cultural Enhancement, Public Safety: Police & Fire, Veterans' Affairs
75	Grundy, Kendall, Lasalle, Will	John D. Anthony	Republican	2013	Member: Appropriations-Human Services, Business Growth & Incentives, Energy, Insurance, Joint Criminal Justice Reform Committee, Judiciary, Restorative Justice
75	Grundy, Kendall, Lasalle, Will	Pam Roth	Republican	2011	
76	Bureau, Lasalle, Livingston, Putnam	Frank J. Mautino	Democratic	1991	Member: Agriculture & Conservation, Insurance, Revenue & Finance, Rules
77	Cook, Dupage	Kathleen Willis	Democratic	2013	Member: Appropriations-Human Services, Energy, Public Safety: Police & Fire, State Government Administration, Transportation, Regulation, Roads
78	Cook	Camille Y. Lilly	Democratic	2010	Member: Appropriations-Human Services, Appropriations-Public Safety, Elementary & Secondary Education, Health & Healthcare Disparities, Housing, Museums Arts & Cultural Enhancement (chair), Transportation, Regulation, Roads
79	Grundy, Kankakee, Will	Katherine Cloonen	Democratic	2013	Member: Agriculture & Conservation, Cities & Villages, Economic Development, State Government Administration
80	Cook, Will	Anthony DeLuca	Democratic	2009	Member: Appropriations-Public Safety, Business Growth & Incentives, Business Occupational Licenses, Cities & Villages (chair), Insurance, Mass Transit, Public Safety: Police & Fire, Tollway Oversight
81	Dupage, Will	Ron Sandack	Republican	2010	Member: Economic Development, Health Care Licenses, International Trade & Commerce, Judiciary, Labor & Commerce, Mass Transit, Tollway Oversight, Transportation, Regulation, Roads
82	Cook, DuPage, Will	Jim Durkin	Republican	1995	
83	Kane	Linda Chapa LaVia	Democratic	2003	Member: Accountability & Administrative Review, Appropriations-Elementary & Secondary Education, Appropriations-Higher Education, Biotechnology, Business Occupational Licenses, Consumer Protection, Elementary & Secondary Education (chair), Veterans' Affairs (chair)
84	DuPage, Kane, Kendall, Will	Stephanie A. Kifowit	Democratic	2013	Member: Agriculture & Conservation, Appropriations-General Service, Cities & Villages, Economic Development, Small Business Empowerment & Workforce
85	Dupage, Will	Emily McAsey	Democratic	2009	Member: Appropriations-Elementary & Secondary Education, Economic Development (chair), Environment (chair), State Government Administration, Veterans' Affairs
86	Will	Lawrence M. Walsh Jr.	Democratic	2012	Member: Appropriations-General Service, Business Growth & Incentives, Cities & Villages, Economic Development, Small Business Empowerment & Workforce, Transportation, Regulation, Roads
87	Logan, Menard, Sangamon, Tazewell	Rich Brauer	Republican	2003	Member: Financial Institutions, International Trade & Commerce, Public Utilities, Tourism & Conventions, Transportation: Vehicles & Safety
88	McLean, Tazewell	Keith P. Sommer	Republican	1999	Member: Adoption Reform, Business Occupational Licenses, Consumer Protection, Economic Development, Insurance, International Trade & Commerce
89	Carroll, Jo Daviess, Ogle, Stephenson, Whiteside, Winnebago	Jim Sacia	Republican	2003	
89	Carroll, Jo Daviess, Ogle, Stephenson, Whiteside, Winnebago	Brian W. Stewart	Republican	2013	Member: Accountability & Administrative Review, Agriculture & Conservation, Judiciary, Tourism & Conventions
90	DeKalb, Lasalle, Lee, Ogle, Winnebago	Tom Demmer	Republican	2013	Member: Appropriations-Human Services, Economic Development, Executive, Health & Healthcare Disparities, Health Care Availability Access, Higher Education, Human Services, Transportation, Regulation, Roads
91	Fulton, Peoria, Tazewell	Michael Unes	Republican	2011	Member: Appropriations-Human Services, Cities & Villages, Economic Development, Elementary & Secondary Education, Insurance, International Trade & Commerce, Small Business Empowerment & Workforce, Transportation: Vehicles & Safety
92	Peoria	Jehan A. Gordon-Booth	Democratic	2009	Member: Accountability & Administrative Review (chair), Appropriations-Higher Education, Financial Institutions, International Trade & Commerce, Public Utilities, Veterans' Affairs
93	Brown, Cass, Fulton, Knox, Mason, McDonough, Schuyler, Warren	Norine Hammond	Republican	2010	Member: Accountability & Administrative Review, Appropriations-Higher Education, Consumer Protection, Higher Education, Human Services, Insurance
94	Adams, Hancock, Henderson, Warren	Jil Tracy	Republican	2006	Member: Business Growth & Incentives, Economic Development, Judiciary, Labor & Commerce, Public Utilities
95	Christian, Macoupin, Madison, Montgomery	Wayne Rosenthal	Republican	2011	Member: Agriculture & Conservation, Appropriations-Elementary & Secondary Education, Energy, Financial Institutions, State Government Administration, Veterans' Affairs
96	Christian, Macon, Sangamon	Sue Scherer	Democratic	2013	Member: Agriculture & Conservation, Economic Development, Higher Education, Public Safety: Police & Fire, Small Business Empowerment & Workforce
97	Kendall, Will	Tom Cross	Republican	1993	Member: Economic Development
98	Will	Natalie A. Manley	Democratic	2013	Member: Appropriations-Human Services, Cities & Villages, Housing, International Trade & Commerce, Small Business Empowerment & Workforce, Transportation, Regulation, Roads
99	Sangamon	Raymond Poe	Republican	1995	Member: Agriculture & Conservation, Appropriations-Higher Education, Business Occupational Licenses, Consumer Protection, Personnel & Pensions
100	Calhoun, Greene, Jersey, Macoupin, Madison, Morgan, Pike, Sangamon, Scott	C.D. Davidsmeyer	Republican	2012	Member: Appropriations-General Service, Appropriations-Human Services, Biotechnology, Business Occupational Licenses, Cities & Villages, Public Safety: Police & Fire, Veterans' Affairs
101	Champaign, DeWitt, Macon, McLean, Piatt	Bill Mitchell	Republican	1999	Member: Elementary & Secondary Education, Environment, Health & Healthcare Disparities, Housing, Small Business Empowerment & Workforce, Transportation, Regulation, Roads, Transportation: Vehicles & Safety
102	Champaign, Douglas, Edgar, Macon, Moultrie, Shelby, Vermilion	Adam Brown	Republican	2011	Member: Energy, Financial Institutions, Health Care Licenses, Public Utilities, State Government Administration
103	Champaign	Naomi D. Jakobsson	Democratic	2003	Member: Adoption Reform, Appropriations-Higher Education, Environment, Higher Education (chair), Human Services
104	Champaign, Vermilion	Chad Hays	Republican	2010	Member: Appropriations-Human Services, Health Care Availability Access, Higher Education, Housing, Public Safety: Police & Fire, Small Business Empowerment & Workforce, Transportation, Regulation, Roads
105	Livingston, McLean	Dan Brady	Republican	2001	Member: Appropriations-Higher Education, Health & Healthcare Disparities, Higher Education, Insurance, Public Safety: Police & Fire, State Government Administration
106	Ford, Iroquois, Livingston, Vermilion, Woodford	Josh Harms	Republican	2013	Member: Agriculture & Conservation, Appropriations-Higher Education, Business Occupational Licenses, Cities & Villages, Economic Development, Public Safety: Police & Fire, Veterans' Affairs
107	Bond, Clinton, Effingham, Fayette, Marion	John D. Cavaletto	Republican	2009	Member: Agriculture & Conservation, Appropriations-Higher Education, Appropriations-Public Safety, Cities & Villages, Public Safety: Police & Fire, Small Business Empowerment & Workforce
108	Clinton, Madison, St. Clair, Washington	Charles E. Meier	Republican	2013	Member: Agriculture & Conservation, Economic Development, Environment, International Trade & Commerce, Small Business Empowerment & Workforce
109	Clay, Edwards, Effingham, Jasper, Lawrence, Richland, Wabash, Wayne, White	David Reis	Republican	2005	Member: Appropriations-Public Safety, Energy, Financial Institutions, Insurance
110	Clark, Coles, Crawford, Cumberland, Edgar, Lawrence	Brad E. Halbrook	Republican	2012	Member: Agriculture & Conservation, Appropriations-Higher Education, Biotechnology, Counties & Townships, Environment
111	Jersey, Madison	Daniel V. Beiser	Democratic	2004	Member: Appropriations-Public Safety, Financial Institutions, Transportation, Regulation, Roads (chair), Transportation: Vehicles & Safety
112	Madison, St. Clair	Dwight Kay	Republican	2011	Member: Appropriations-Human Services, Appropriations-Public Safety, Environment, Insurance, Judiciary, Labor & Commerce
113	Madison, St. Clair	Jay Hoffman	Democratic	1991	Member: Appropriations-Public Safety, Judiciary, Labor & Commerce (chair), Mass Transit, Public Utilities
114	St. Clair	Eddie Lee Jackson Sr.	Democratic	2009	Member: Appropriations-Elementary & Secondary Education, Consumer Protection, Counties & Townships (chair), Energy, Executive
115	Jackson, Jefferson, Perry, Union, Washington	Mike Bost	Republican	1995	
115	Jackson, Jefferson, Perry, Union, Washington	Terri Bryant	Republican	2015	
116	Monroe, Perry, Randolph, St. Clair	Jerry F. Costello II	Democratic	2011	Member: Agriculture & Conservation, International Trade & Commerce, Public Safety: Police & Fire, Tourism & Conventions, Veterans' Affairs
117	Franklin, Hamilton, Williamson	John E. Bradley	Democratic	2003	Member: Judiciary, Labor & Commerce, Revenue & Finance (chair)
118	Alexander, Gallatin, Hamilton, Hardin, Jackson, Johnson, Massac, Pope, Pulaski, Saline, Union	Brandon W. Phelps	Democratic	2003	Member: Appropriations-Higher Education, Energy, Environment, Health Care Licenses, Labor & Commerce, Public Safety: Police & Fire, Public Utilities (chair), Veterans' Affairs

== See also ==
- List of Illinois state legislatures
