= 97th Illinois General Assembly =

Illinois state legislative session from 2011 to 2012

←	96th	98th	→
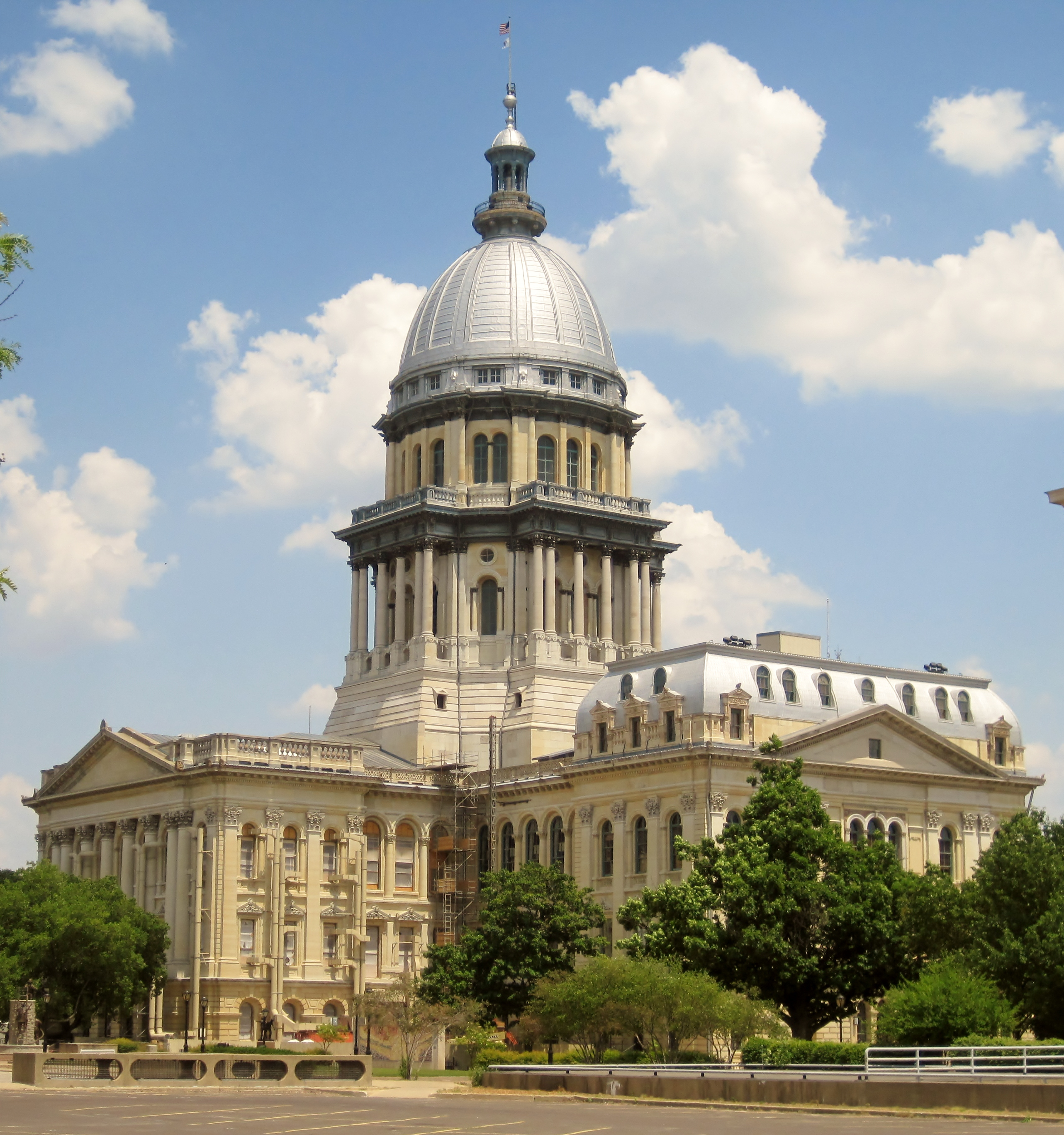
- The Illinois State Capitol in 2012

Overview
- Meeting place: Springfield, Illinois
- Term: 2011 – 2013
- Election: 2010
- Website: Official site

Illinois Senate
- President: John J. Cullerton, Democrat

Illinois House of Representatives
- Speaker: Michael J. Madigan, Democrat

The 97th Illinois General Assembly convened on January 12, 2011 and adjourned sine die on January 8, 2013. Over that period, the Illinois Senate was in session for 137 legislative days, and the Illinois House was in session for 166 legislative days.

All members of the House, and one-third of the members of the Senate, were elected in the 2010 election. The House and Senate both had Democratic Party majorities during this session.

== Legislation ==
The 97th General Assembly enacted a total of 1,173 bills into law.

On August 17, 2012, Governor Pat Quinn called the General Assembly into special session to address the Illinois pension crisis. No changes to the state pension system were passed. The House and Senate voted to place the Illinois Public Pension Amendment on the November 2012 ballot, which would have amended the Illinois Constitution to require a 60% majority of both houses for any increase to pension benefits. However, the ballot measure did not achieve the required majority of the popular vote.

As part of the redistricting process following the 2010 US Census, the General Assembly approved new congressional and state legislative maps for the following decade. The new maps for the Illinois House and Senate districts were signed into law by the governor on June 3, 2011. As a result, several Republican members of the General Assembly were drawn into the same district. Republican leaders of the House and Senate sued to block the map, but a three-judge panel dismissed their suit in December 2011.

== Senate ==
Under the 1970 Illinois Constitution, the Illinois Senate has 59 members, who are elected to overlapping two- and four-year terms. All 59 Senate seats are up for election following decennial redistricting. Because 2010 was the last election year before redistricting based on the 2010 census, the 21 senators elected in 2010 were all elected to two-year terms.

=== Senate leadership ===
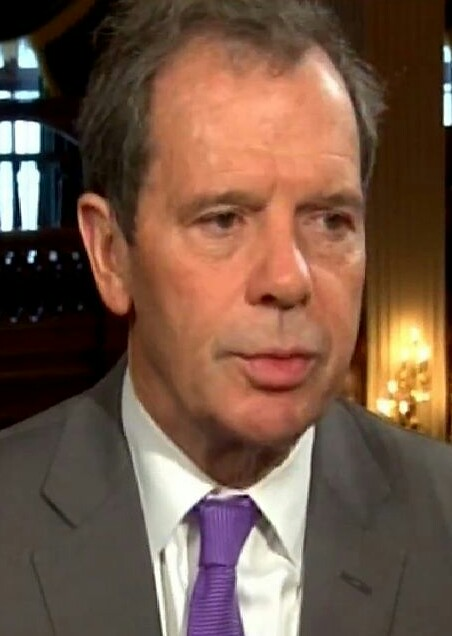
Senate president John Cullerton

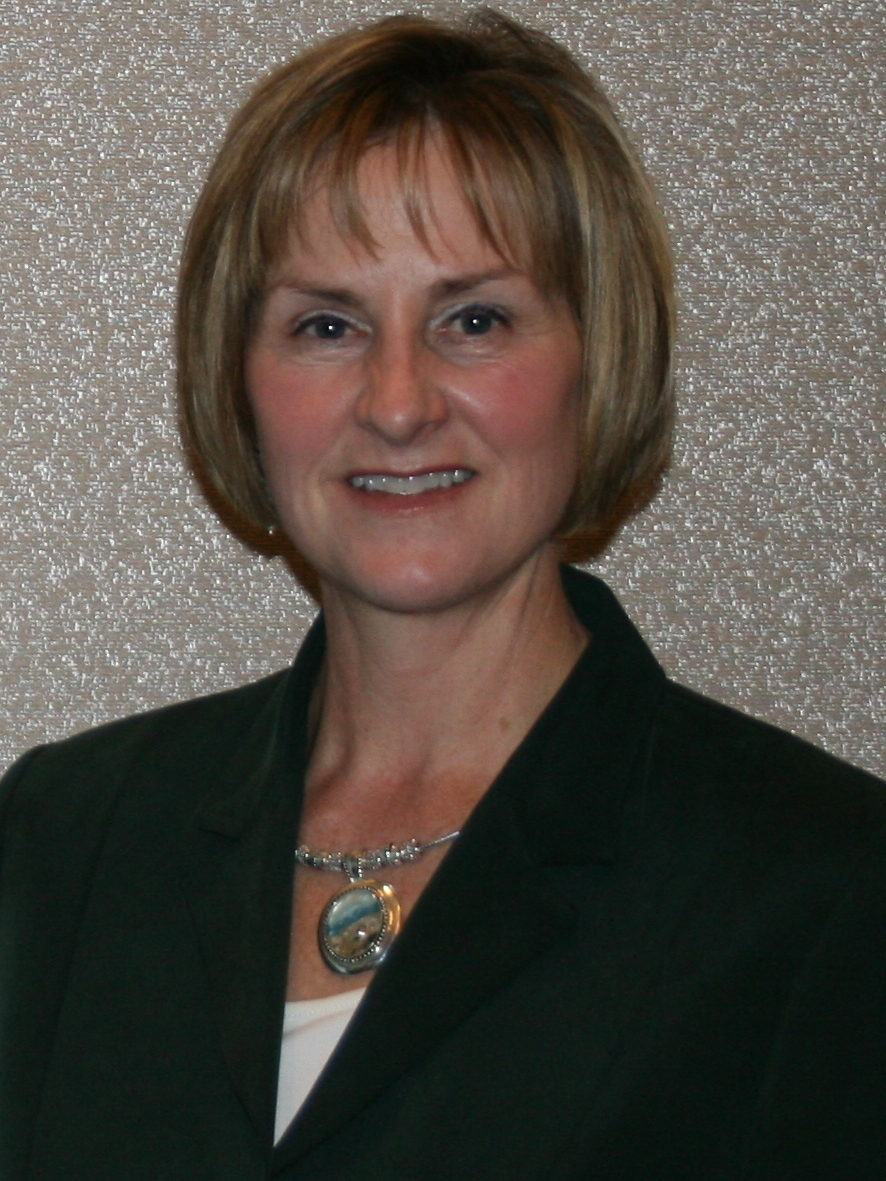
Minority Leader Christine Radogno

Position	Name	Party	District
President	John J. Cullerton	Democratic	39
Majority Leader	James Clayborne Jr.	Democratic	57
Minority Leader	Christine Radogno	Republican	41

=== Party composition ===
The Senate of the 97th General Assembly consisted of 24 Republicans and 35 Democrats.

Affiliation	Members
Democratic Party	35
Republican Party	24
Total	59

=== State senators ===
District	Counties represented	Senator	Party	First year	Committees
1	Cook	Antonio Muñoz	Democratic	1999	Chair: Executive Appointments; Member: Energy; Executive; Gaming; Insurance; Procurement
2	Cook	William Delgado	Democratic	1999	Chair: Public Health; Member: Appropriations I; Executive Appointments; Human Services
3	Cook	Mattie Hunter	Democratic	2003	Chair: Human Services; Member: Appropriations I; Gaming; Public Health; Redistricting
4	Cook	Kimberly A. Lightford	Democratic	1998	Member: Assignments; Education; Executive; Executive Appointments; Financial Institutions; Redistricting
5	Cook	Rickey R. Hendon; Resigned February 24, 2011.	Democratic	1993	
5	Cook	Annazette R. Collins; Appointed March 14, 2011.	Democratic	2011	Member: Education; Environment; Human Services; Licensed Activities; State Government & Veterans Affairs
6	Cook	John J. Cullerton	Democratic	1979	Member: Executive
7	Cook	Heather A. Steans	Democratic	2008	Chair: Appropriations I Member: Appropriations II; Environment; Human Services; Public Health
8	Cook	Ira I. Silverstein	Democratic	1999	Chair: Judiciary; Member: Executive; Financial Institutions; Gaming; Insurance
9	Cook	Jeffrey M. Schoenberg	Democratic	1990	Member: Appropriations I; Appropriations II; Executive; Financial Institutions; Procurement; Public Health
9	Cook	Daniel Biss; Sworn in January 7, 2013.	Democratic	2013	
10	Cook	John G. Mulroe	Democratic	2010	Member: Appropriations II; Criminal Law; Education; Judiciary; Labor
11	Cook	Louis S. Viverito	Democratic	1995	
11	Cook	Steven M. Landek	Democratic	2011	Member: Appropriations II; Commerce; Human Services; Local Government; Revenue
12	Cook	Martin A. Sandoval	Democratic	2003	Chair: Transportation; Member: Agriculture and Conservation; Energy; Gaming; Licensed Activities
13	Cook	Kwame Raoul	Democratic	2004	Chair: Pensions and Investments; Redistricting; Member: Criminal Law; Financial Institutions; Judiciary
14	Cook	Emil Jones III	Democratic	2009	Chair: Commerce; Member: Energy; Licensed Activities; Local Government; Redistricting; Transportation
15	Cook	James T. Meeks	Democratic	2003	Chair: Education; Member: Higher Education; Revenue
16	Cook	Jacqueline Y. Collins	Democratic	2003	Chair: Financial Institutions; Member: Insurance; Pensions and Investments; Redistricting
17	Cook	Donne E. Trotter	Democratic	1988	Member: Appropriations I; Appropriations II; Energy; Executive; Pensions and Investments
18	Cook	Edward D. Maloney	Democratic	1992	Chair: Higher Education; Member: Appropriations II; Labor; Redistricting; Transportation
19	Cook, Will	M. Maggie Crotty	Democratic	1997	Member: Environment; Executive; Executive Appointments; Higher Education; State Government & Veterans Affairs
20	Cook	Iris Y. Martinez	Democratic	2003	Chair: Licensed Activities; Member: Education; Energy; Pensions and Investments; Redistricting
21	Cook, DuPage	Ron Sandack	Republican	2010	Member: Appropriations I; Financial Institutions; Judiciary; Labor; Licensed Activities
22	Cook, Kane	Michael Noland	Democratic	2007	Chair: Criminal Law; Member: Commerce; Energy; Judiciary; Public Health; Redistricting
23	DuPage	Carole Pankau	Republican	1993	Member: Commerce; Energy; Environment; Public Health; State Government & Veterans Affairs
24	DuPage, Will	Kirk W. Dillard	Republican	1993	Member: Assignments; Criminal Law; Energy; Judiciary; Licensed Activities; Redistricting
25	Kane, Kendall, La Salle	Chris Lauzen	Republican	1993	Member: Appropriations I; Appropriations II; Pensions and Investments; Revenue
26	Cook, Lake, McHenry	Dan Duffy	Republican	2009	Member: Appropriations I; Insurance; Pensions and Investments; Procurement; Redistricting; Revenue
27	Cook, Lake	Matt Murphy	Republican	2007	Member: Appropriations I; Appropriations II; Executive; Judiciary; Procurement; Redistricting
28	Cook, DuPage, Kane	John J. Millner	Republican	2003	Member: Criminal Law; Energy; Executive Appointments; Higher Education; Transportation
29	Cook, Lake	Susan Garrett	Democratic	1999	Chair: Environment; Member: Commerce; Education; Public Health; Revenue; State Government & Veterans Affairs
30	Cook, Lake	Terry Link	Democratic	1997	Chair: Gaming; Member: Financial Institutions; Local Government; State Government & Veterans Affairs
31	Lake	Suzi Schmidt	Republican	2011	Member: Appropriations II; Commerce; Education; Financial Institutions; Local Government
32	McHenry	Pamela J. Althoff	Republican	2003	Chair: Enterprise Zone Extensions; Procurement; Member: Appropriations II; Human Services; Labor; Licensed Activities; Local Government
33	Cook	Dan Kotowski	Democratic	2007	Chair: Appropriations II; Member: Appropriations I; Criminal Law; Higher Education; Revenue
34	Winnebago	Dave Syverson	Republican	1993	Member: Appropriations I; Gaming; Human Services; Insurance; Public Health
35	Boone, De Kalb, Ogle, Winnebago	J. Bradley Burzynski; Resigned January 24, 2011.	Republican	1990	
35	Boone, De Kalb, Ogle, Winnebago	Christine J. Johnson; Appointed January 25, 2011.	Republican	2011	Member: Education; Higher Education; Licensed Activities; Public Health
36	Carroll, Henry, Mercer, Rock Island, Whiteside	Mike Jacobs	Democratic	2005	Chair: Energy; Member: Appropriations I; Commerce; Insurance
37	Bureau, Henry, Knox, Marshall, Peoria, Stark, Woodford	Dale E. Risinger	Republican	2003	
37	Bureau, Henry, Knox, Marshall, Peoria, Stark, Woodford	Darin M. LaHood	Republican	2011	Member: Energy; Enterprise Zone Extensions; Environment; Gaming; Human Services; Transportation
38	Bureau, Grundy, Iroquois, Kankakee, La Salle, Putnam, Will	Sue Rezin	Republican	2010	Member: Agriculture and Conservation; Appropriations II; Commerce; Energy; Environment
39	Cook, DuPage	Don Harmon	Democratic	2003	Chair: Executive; Procurement; Member: Assignments; Judiciary; Redistricting
40	Cook, Iroquois, Kankakee, Will	Toi W. Hutchinson	Democratic	2009	Chair: Revenue; Member: Agriculture and Conservation; Enterprise Zone Extensions; Judiciary; Labor; Procurement; Transportation
41	Cook, DuPage, Will	Christine Radogno	Republican	1997	Member: Executive
42	Kane, Kendall, Will	Linda Holmes	Democratic	2007	Chair: State Government & Veterans Affairs; Member: Agriculture and Conservation; Gaming; Labor; Local Government
43	Will	A. J. Wilhelmi; Resigned February 25, 2012.	Democratic	2005	Chair: Judiciary; Member: Agriculture and Conservation; Environment; Gaming; Transportation
43	Will	Pat McGuire	Democratic	2012	Member: Environment; Gaming; Higher Education; Transportation
44	Christian, De Witt, Logan, Macon, McLean, Sangamon, Tazewell	William E. Brady	Republican	1993	Member: Energy; Environment; Executive; Insurance; Pensions and Investments
45	Carroll, Henry, Jo Daviess, Lee, Ogle, Stephenson, Whiteside, Winnebago	Tim Bivins	Republican	2008	Member: Criminal Law; Executive Appointments; Human Services; Insurance; Procurement; Revenue
46	Fulton, Peoria, Tazewell	David Koehler	Democratic	2006	Chair: Local Government; Member: Agriculture and Conservation; Energy; Enterprise Zone Extensions; Labor; Redistricting; Transportation
47	Adams, Brown, Cass, Fulton, Hancock, Henderson, Mason, McDonough, Mercer, Pike, Schuyler, Scott, Warren	John M. Sullivan	Democratic	2003	Member: Agriculture and Conservation; Energy; Higher Education; Insurance; Revenue; Transportation
48	DuPage, Kane, Kendall	Thomas Johnson	Republican	2011	Member: Criminal Law; Gaming; Judiciary; Labor; State Government & Veterans Affairs
49	Calhoun, Christian, Fayette, Greene, Jersey, Macoupin, Madison, Montgomery, Morgan, Pike, Shelby	Wm. Sam McCann	Republican	2011	Member: Agriculture and Conservation; Commerce; Financial Institutions; Higher Education; Transportation
50	Logan, Menard, Sangamon	Larry K. Bomke	Republican	1995	Member: Financial Institutions; Local Government; Pensions and Investments; Procurement; Transportation
51	Bond, Champaign, Clinton, De Witt, Effingham, Fayette, Macon, Madison, McLean, Piatt, Shelby, St. Clair	Kyle McCarter	Republican	2009	Member: Agriculture and Conservation; Education; Enterprise Zone Extensions; Financial Institutions; Licensed Activities; State Government & Veterans Affairs
52	Champaign, Vermilion	Michael W. Frerichs	Democratic	2007	Chair: Agriculture and Conservation; Enterprise Zone Extensions; Member: Financial Institutions; Higher Education; Licensed Activities; Pensions and Investments; Procurement
53	Champaign, Ford, Iroquois, Livingston, Marshall, McLean, Tazewell, Woodford	Shane Cultra	Republican	2011	Member: Labor; Local Government; Public Health; Redistricting; Revenue
54	Bond, Clay, Clinton, Edwards, Effingham, Hamilton, Jasper, Jefferson, Marion, Richland, Wayne, White	John O. Jones	Republican	1995	Member: Agriculture and Conservation; Energy; Executive; Gaming; Insurance
55	Champaign, Clark, Coles, Crawford, Cumberland, Douglas, Edgar, Effingham, Lawrence, Piatt, Shelby, Wabash	Dale A. Righter	Republican	1998	Member: Assignments; Energy; Executive; Executive Appointments; Redistricting; State Government & Veterans Affairs
56	Jersey, Madison, St. Clair	William R. Haine	Democratic	2002	Chair: Insurance; Member: Criminal Law; Judiciary; Licensed Activities; Redistricting
57	St. Clair	James F. Clayborne Jr.	Democratic	1995	Chair: Assignments; Member: Energy; Executive; Executive Appointments; Pensions and Investments
58	Clinton, Jackson, Monroe, Perry, Randolph, St. Clair, Washington	David S. Luechtefeld	Republican	1995	Member: Education; Executive; Executive Appointments; Higher Education; Redistricting
59	Alexander, Franklin, Gallatin, Hamilton, Hardin, Johnson, Massac, Pope, Pulaski, Saline, Union, White, Williamson	Gary Forby	Democratic	2001	Chair: Labor; Member: Energy; Insurance; Licensed Activities

== House ==
The Illinois House has 118 members, who all serve two-year terms.

On August 17, 2012, the House expelled Derrick Smith based on bribery allegations. This was the first time either chamber of the General Assembly had expelled a member since 1905. However, Smith was reelected to the House in November.

=== Party composition ===
The House of the 97th General Assembly consisted of 54 Republicans and 64 Democrats.

Affiliation	Members
Democratic Party	64
Republican Party	54
Total	118

=== House leadership ===
Position	Name	Party	District
Speaker of the House	Michael J. Madigan	Democratic	22
Majority Leader	Barbara Flynn Currie	Democratic	25
Minority Leader	Tom Cross	Republican	84

=== State representatives ===
District	Counties represented	Representative	Party	First year	Committees
1	Cook	Susana A. Mendoza	Democratic	2001	
1	Cook	Dena M. Carli	Democratic	2011	Member: Adoption Reform; Consumer Protection; International Trade & Commerce; Judiciary II - Criminal Law; Tourism & Conventions
2	Cook	Edward J. Acevedo	Democratic	1997	Chair: Bio-Technology; Member: Aging; Appropriations-Elementary & Secondary Educ; Consumer Protection; Executive; Health & Healthcare Disparities; Redistricting; Select Committee on Discipline; State Government Administration; Telecommunications
3	Cook	Luis Arroyo	Democratic	2006	Chair: Appropriations-Public Safety; Member: Executive; Health Care Availability Access; Labor; Public Utilities
4	Cook	Cynthia Soto	Democratic	2001	Chair: Mass Transit; Member: Appropriations-Elementary & Secondary Educ; Appropriations-Higher Education; Environment & Energy; Financial Institutions
5	Cook	Kenneth Dunkin	Democratic	2002	Chair: Appropriations-Higher Education; Tourism & Conventions; Member: Appropriations-General Service; Elementary & Secondary Education; Financial Institutions; Insurance; State Government Administration
6	Cook	Esther Golar	Democratic	2005	Chair: Disability Services; Member: Elementary & Secondary Education; Health Care Availability Access; Housing; Judiciary II - Criminal Law; Public Utilities
7	Cook	Karen A. Yarbrough	Democratic	2001	Chair: Housing; Member: Environmental Health; Insurance; Mass Transit; Redistricting
7	Cook	Cory Foster	Democratic	2012	
8	Cook	La Shawn K. Ford	Democratic	2007	Chair: Small Business Empowerment & Workforce; Member: Health & Healthcare Disparities; Higher Education; Housing; Insurance; Tollway Oversight; Tourism & Conventions; Veterans' Affairs
9	Cook	Arthur Turner	Democratic	2010	Member: Appropriations-General Service; Consumer Protection; Housing; Judiciary I - Civil Law; Revenue & Finance; Small Business Empowerment & Workforce
10	Cook	Annazette Collins; Resigned March 2011.	Democratic	2000	
10	Cook	Derrick Smith; Appointed March 2011. Expelled August 17, 2012.	Democratic	2011	Member: Appropriations-Public Safety; Cities and Villages; Housing; Human Services; State Government Administration
10	Cook	Eddie Winters; Sworn in September 9, 2011.	Democratic	2012	
11	Cook	Ann Williams	Democratic	2011	Member: Adoption Reform; Business Occupational Licenses; Consumer Protection; Environmental Health; Judiciary I - Civil Law; Mass Transit
12	Cook	Sara Feigenholtz	Democratic	1995	Chair: Adoption Reform; Appropriations-Human Services; Member: Environment & Energy; Insurance; Mass Transit; Tourism & Conventions
13	Cook	Greg Harris	Democratic	2006	Chair: Human Services; Member: Aging; Appropriations-Public Safety; Health Care Availability Access; Insurance; Select Committee on Discipline; Tourism & Conventions
14	Cook	Harry Osterman	Democratic	2000	
14	Cook	Kelly M. Cassidy	Democratic	2011	Member: Appropriations-Higher Education; Appropriations-Public Safety; Consumer Protection; Environmental Health; Labor
15	Cook	John D'Amico	Democratic	2004	Chair: Transportation: Vehicles & Safety; Member: Aging; Elections & Campaign Reform; Labor; Transportation: Regulation, Roads & Bridges
16	Cook	Lou Lang	Democratic	1987	Chair: Judiciary II - Criminal Law; Member: Appropriations-General Service; Insurance; Judiciary I - Civil Law; Personnel & Pensions; Redistricting; Rules
17	Cook	Laura Fine	Democratic	2013	
17	Cook	Daniel Biss	Democratic	2011	Member: Appropriations-Elementary and Secondary Education; Appropriations-Higher Education; Bio-technology; Consumer Protection; International Trade and Commerce; Personnel and Pensions; Small Business Empowerment and Workforce Development
18	Cook	Robyn Gabel	Democratic	2010	Member: Appropriations-Human Services; Environment & Energy; Environmental Health; Health & Healthcare Disparities; Insurance; International Trade & Commerce; Mass Transit; Small Business Empowerment & Workforce
19	Cook	Joseph M. Lyons	Democratic	1996	Member: Aging; Executive; Financial Institutions; Telecommunications; Tollway Oversight; Transportation: Regulation, Roads & Bridges; Veterans' Affairs
20	Cook	Michael P. McAuliffe	Republican	1996	Chair: Veterans' Affairs; Member: Business Occupational Licenses; Health Care Licenses; Transportation: Regulation, Roads & Bridges
21	Cook	Michael J. Zalewski	Democratic	2008	Chair: Elections & Campaign Reform; Health Care Licenses; Member: Appropriations-Elementary & Secondary Educ; Appropriations-Public Safety; Business Occupational Licenses; Judiciary I - Civil Law; Revenue & Finance
22	Cook	Michael J. Madigan	Democratic	1971	
23	Cook	Daniel J. Burke	Democratic	1991	Chair: Executive; Member: Business Occupational Licenses; Financial Institutions; International Trade & Commerce; Mass Transit; Pension Investments; Personnel & Pensions
24	Cook	Elizabeth Hernandez	Democratic	2007	Chair: Aging; Member: Appropriations-Elementary & Secondary Educ; Appropriations-Human Services; Consumer Protection; Disability Services; Health & Healthcare Disparities; Labor
25	Cook	Barbara Flynn Currie	Democratic	1979	Chair: Redistricting; Rules; Select Committee on Discipline; Member: Pension Investments; Personnel & Pensions; Revenue & Finance
26	Cook	William D. Burns	Democratic	2009	
26	Cook	Kimberly du Buclet	Democratic	2011	Member: Appropriations-Human Services; Health & Healthcare Disparities; Health Care Availability Access; Higher Education; Select Committee on Discipline; Small Business Empowerment & Workforce; Tourism & Conventions
27	Cook	Monique D. Davis	Democratic	1987	Chair: Insurance; Member: Appropriations-General Service; Appropriations-Higher Education; Elementary & Secondary Education; Financial Institutions; State Government Administration
28	Cook	Robert Rita	Democratic	2003	Chair: Business Occupational Licenses; Tollway Oversight; Member: Appropriations-Public Safety; Consumer Protection; Executive; Mass Transit; Transportation: Vehicles & Safety
29	Cook	Thaddeus Jones	Democratic	2011	Member: Appropriations-Higher Education; Appropriations-Public Safety; Cities & Villages; Financial Institutions; Labor; Transportation: Regulation, Roads & Bridges
30	Cook	William Davis	Democratic	2003	Chair: Appropriations-Elementary & Secondary Educ; Health & Healthcare Disparities; Member: Appropriations-Higher Education; International Trade & Commerce; Labor; Mass Transit; Special Investigating Committee
31	Cook	Mary E. Flowers	Democratic	1985	Chair: Health Care Availability Access; Member: Agriculture & Conservation; Appropriations-Higher Education; Environmental Health; Health & Healthcare Disparities; Higher Education; Human Services; Small Business Empowerment & Workforce
32	Cook	André M. Thapedi	Democratic	2009	Member: Financial Institutions; International Trade & Commerce; Judiciary I - Civil Law; Public Utilities; Special Investigating Committee
33	Cook	Marlow H. Colvin	Democratic	2001	Member: Elementary and Secondary Education; Environment and Energy; Insurance; Labor; Redistricting
33	Cook	Marcus C. Evans Jr.	Democratic	2012	Member: Appropriations-Elementary & Secondary Educ; Environmental Health; Health Care Licenses; Labor; Telecommunications
34	Cook	Constance A. Howard	Democratic	1995	
34	Cook	Elgie R. Sims Jr.	Democratic	2012	Chair: Judiciary II-Criminal Law; Member: Human Services; Aging; Appropriations-Public Safety; Health and Healthcare Disparities; Housing; Public Utilities; Small Business Empowerment and Workforce Development; Veterans’ Affairs
35	Cook	William Cunningham	Democratic	2011	Member: Appropriations-Public Safety; Cities & Villages; Judiciary II - Criminal Law; Labor; Transportation: Vehicles & Safety
36	Cook	Kelly Burke	Democratic	2011	Member: Agriculture & Conservation; Appropriations-General Service; Cities & Villages; Financial Institutions; Health Care Licenses; Telecommunications; Tollway Oversight
37	Cook, Will	Kevin A. McCarthy	Democratic	1997	
37	Cook, Will	Charles W. Krezwick	Democratic	2012	Member: Armed Forces & Military Affairs; Cities & Villages; Pension Investments; Telecommunications; Transportation: Vehicles & Safety
38	Cook	Al Riley	Democratic	2007	Chair: Cities & Villages; Member: Appropriations-Elementary & Secondary Educ; Appropriations-General Service; Appropriations-Higher Education; Counties & Townships; Mass Transit; Select Committee on Discipline; Tollway Oversight
39	Cook	Maria Antonia Berrios	Democratic	2003	Chair: Consumer Protection; Member: Executive; Insurance; International Trade & Commerce; Mass Transit; Tourism & Conventions
40	Cook	Deborah Mell	Democratic	2009	Member: Aging; Appropriations-Elementary & Secondary Educ; Elections & Campaign Reform; Housing; Human Services; Mass Transit; Small Business Empowerment & Workforce
41	DuPage	Chris Nybo	Republican	2011	Member: Consumer Protection; Environment & Energy; Mass Transit; Select Committee on Discipline; Tollway Oversight; Transportation: Regulation, Roads & Bridges
42	Cook, DuPage	Sandra M. Pihos	Republican	2003	Member: Aging; Appropriations-Elementary & Secondary Educ; Consumer Protection; Disability Services; Elementary & Secondary Education; Housing
43	Cook, Kane	Keith Farnham	Democratic	2009	Member: Aging; Appropriations-Human Services; Disability Services; Elementary & Secondary Education; Environment & Energy; State Government Administration; Veterans' Affairs
44	Cook	Fred Crespo	Democratic	2007	Chair: Appropriations-General Service; Member: Elementary & Secondary Education; Mass Transit; Public Utilities; Small Business Empowerment & Workforce; Tourism & Conventions
45	DuPage	Franco Coladipietro	Republican	2007	Member: Bio-Technology; Business Occupational Licenses; Financial Institutions; International Trade & Commerce; Public Utilities
46	DuPage	Dennis M. Reboletti	Republican	2007	Member: Environment & Energy; Health Care Availability Access; Judiciary II - Criminal Law; Special Investigating Committee; Tollway Oversight; Transportation: Vehicles & Safety
47	DuPage	Patricia R. Bellock	Republican	1999	Member: Appropriations-Human Services; Disability Services; Financial Institutions; Human Services; Labor; Mass Transit
48	DuPage, Will	Michael G. Connelly	Republican	2009	Member: Business Occupational Licenses; Financial Institutions; Judiciary I - Civil Law; Public Utilities; Select Committee on Discipline; Small Business Empowerment & Workforce; Veterans' Affairs
49	Kane	Timothy L. Schmitz	Republican	1999	Member: Health & Healthcare Disparities; Housing; Human Services; Labor; Pension Investments; Personnel & Pensions; Redistricting; Rules; Telecommunications
50	Kane, Kendall, La Salle	Kay Hatcher	Republican	2009	Member: Appropriations-General Service; Counties & Townships; Financial Institutions; Public Utilities; Small Business Empowerment & Workforce; Tourism & Conventions
51	Lake	Ed Sullivan Jr.	Republican	2003	Member: Consumer Protection; Executive; Labor; Mass Transit; Pension Investments; Public Utilities; Revenue & Finance; Telecommunications
52	Cook, Lake, McHenry	Mark H. Beaubien Jr.	Republican	1996	
52	Cook, Lake, McHenry	Kent Gaffney	Republican	2011	Member: Appropriations-General Service; Insurance; Revenue and Finance
52	Cook, Lake, McHenry	David McSweeney	Republican	2013	Member: Appropriations-General Service; Armed Forces & Military Affairs; Insurance; Revenue & Finance; Small Business Empowerment & Workforce
53	Cook, Lake	Sidney H. Mathias	Republican	1999	Member: Cities & Villages; Judiciary I - Civil Law; Mass Transit; Select Committee on Discipline; State Government Administration; Tollway Oversight
54	Cook	Thomas Morrison	Republican	2011	Member: Appropriations-General Service; Elementary & Secondary Education; Insurance; Mass Transit; Personnel & Pensions; Tollway Oversight
55	Cook, DuPage, Kane	Randy Ramey Jr.	Republican	2005	Member: Appropriations-General Service; Consumer Protection; Counties & Townships; State Government Administration; Telecommunications; Tourism & Conventions
56	Cook, DuPage	Michelle Mussman	Democratic	2011	Member: Appropriations-Elementary & Secondary Educ; Appropriations-Human Services; Environmental Health; State Government Administration; Tourism & Conventions
57	Cook	Elaine Nekritz	Democratic	2003	Chair: Judiciary I - Civil Law; Personnel & Pensions; Special Investigating Committee; Member: Environmental Health; Pension Investments; Transportation: Regulation, Roads & Bridges
58	Lake	Karen May	Democratic	2001	Chair: Environment & Energy; Environmental Health; Telecommunications; Member: Health Care Availability Access; Pension Investments; Personnel & Pensions; Public Utilities
59	Cook, Lake	Carol A. Sente	Democratic	2009	Member: Aging; Environmental Health; Higher Education; Public Utilities; State Government Administration; Veterans' Affairs
60	Lake	Rita Mayfield	Democratic	2010	Member: Adoption Reform; Appropriations-Human Services; Bio-Technology; Cities & Villages; Counties & Townships; Elementary & Secondary Education; Small Business Empowerment & Workforce
61	Lake	JoAnn D. Osmond	Republican	2002	Member: Appropriations-Public Safety; Health & Healthcare Disparities; Housing; Human Services; Insurance; Labor; Special Investigating Committee
62	Lake	Sandy Cole	Republican	2007	Member: Adoption Reform; Appropriations-Elementary & Secondary Educ; Appropriations-General Service; Business Occupational Licenses; Human Services; Pension Investments; Revenue & Finance; Tourism & Conventions
63	McHenry	Jack D. Franks	Democratic	1999	Chair: International Trade & Commerce; State Government Administration; Member: Aging; Bio-Technology; Public Utilities; Veterans' Affairs
64	McHenry	Michael W. Tryon	Republican	2005	Member: Environment & Energy; Environmental Health; Executive; Health & Healthcare Disparities; Health Care Availability Access; Mass Transit; Pension Investments; Small Business Empowerment & Workforce; Telecommunications
65	Cook	Rosemary Mulligan	Republican	1993	Member: Appropriations-Elementary & Secondary Educ; Appropriations-Human Services; Health & Healthcare Disparities; Health Care Availability Access; Health Care Licenses
66	Cook	David Harris	Republican	1983	Member: Aging; Appropriations-General Service; Health Care Availability Access; Mass Transit; Revenue & Finance; State Government Administration
67	Winnebago	Charles E. Jefferson	Democratic	2001	Member: Aging; Higher Education; Labor; Public Utilities; Tollway Oversight; Tourism & Conventions; Veterans' Affairs
68	Winnebago	Dave Winters	Republican	1995	Member: Environmental Health; Telecommunications; Environment and Energy; International Trade and Commerce; Personnel and Pensions; Public Utilities
68	Winnebago	John M. Cabello	Republican	2012	Member: Environment & Energy; Environmental Health; Public Utilities; Telecommunications
69	Boone, De Kalb, Winnebago	Joe Sosnowski	Republican	2011	Member: Aging; Appropriations-Elementary & Secondary Educ; Cities & Villages; Elementary & Secondary Education; Labor; Select Committee on Discipline; Transportation: Regulation, Roads & Bridges
70	De Kalb, Ogle	Robert W. Pritchard	Republican	2003	Member: Appropriations-Elementary & Secondary Educ; Appropriations-Higher Education; Elementary & Secondary Education; Environmental Health; Higher Education; State Government Administration; Veterans' Affairs
71	Carroll, Henry, Rock Island, Whiteside	Richard Morthland	Republican	2011	Member: Adoption Reform; Appropriations-Higher Education; Cities & Villages; Counties & Townships; Higher Education; Public Utilities; Veterans' Affairs
72	Mercer, Rock Island	Patrick J. Verschoore	Democratic	2003	Chair: Counties & Townships; Member: Agriculture & Conservation; Environment & Energy; Financial Institutions; Health Care Licenses; Public Utilities; Veterans' Affairs
73	Bureau, Marshall, Peoria, Woodford	David R. Leitch	Republican	1986	Member: Appropriations-Human Services; Housing; Labor; Rules
74	Bureau, Henry, Knox, Stark	Donald L. Moffitt	Republican	1993	Member: Agriculture & Conservation; Armed Forces & Military Affairs; Elementary & Secondary Education; State Government Administration; Transportation: Vehicles & Safety; Veterans' Affairs
75	Grundy, Iroquois, Kankakee, La Salle, Will	Pam Roth	Republican	2011	Member: Aging; Appropriations-Elementary & Secondary Educ; Appropriations-Human Services; Consumer Protection; Elementary & Secondary Education; Environmental Health
76	Bureau, La Salle, Putnam	Frank J. Mautino	Democratic	1991	Member: Agriculture & Conservation; Appropriations-General Service; Insurance; Public Utilities; Redistricting; Revenue & Finance; Rules
77	Cook, DuPage	Angelo Saviano	Republican	1993	Member: Aging; Appropriations-Public Safety; Business Occupational Licenses; Health Care Licenses; Public Utilities
78	Cook	Camille Y. Lilly	Democratic	2010	Member: Appropriations-Human Services; Appropriations-Public Safety; Business Occupational Licenses; Elementary & Secondary Education; Health & Healthcare Disparities; Housing; Select Committee on Discipline; Transportation: Regulation, Roads & Bridges
79	Iroquois, Kankakee, Will	Lisa M. Dugan	Democratic	2003	Chair: Agriculture & Conservation; Member: Appropriations-Human Services; Elementary & Secondary Education; Health Care Availability Access; State Government Administration; Tourism & Conventions; Veterans' Affairs
80	Cook, Will	Anthony DeLuca	Democratic	2009	Member: Appropriations-Public Safety; Business Occupational Licenses; Cities & Villages; Mass Transit; Tollway Oversight
81	Cook, DuPage, Will	Renée Kosel	Republican	1997	Member: Appropriations-Elementary & Secondary Educ; Health & Healthcare Disparities; Health Care Licenses; Housing; International Trade & Commerce; Mass Transit; Select Committee on Discipline; Small Business Empowerment & Workforce
82	Will	Jim Durkin	Republican	1995	Member: Environment & Energy; Mass Transit; Public Utilities; Redistricting; Tollway Oversight
83	Kane	Linda Chapa LaVia	Democratic	2003	Chair: Elementary & Secondary Education; Member: Bio-Technology; Environment & Energy; Financial Institutions; Public Utilities; Telecommunications; Veterans' Affairs
84	Kendall, Will	Tom Cross	Republican	1993	Chair: Pension Investments
85	Will	Emily McAsey	Democratic	2009	Member: Aging; Appropriations-Elementary & Secondary Educ; Armed Forces & Military Affairs; Judiciary II - Criminal Law; Small Business Empowerment & Workforce; State Government Administration
86	Will	Jack McGuire	Democratic	1991	Member: Aging; Agriculture and Conservation; Tourism and Conventions
86	Will	Lawrence M. Walsh Jr.	Democratic	2012	
87	Christian, De Witt, Logan, Macon, McLean, Sangamon, Tazewell	Bill Mitchell	Republican	1999	Member: Appropriations-Public Safety; Elementary & Secondary Education; Financial Institutions; Insurance; Telecommunications
88	McLean	Dan Brady	Republican	2001	Member: Appropriations-Higher Education; Elections & Campaign Reform; Executive; Insurance
89	Carroll, Jo Daviess, Ogle, Winnebago, Stephenson	Jim Sacia	Republican	2003	Member: Agriculture & Conservation; Appropriations-Public Safety; Elections & Campaign Reform; International Trade & Commerce; Judiciary II - Criminal Law; Tourism & Conventions; Veterans' Affairs
90	Henry, Lee, Ogle, Whiteside	Jerry L. Mitchell	Republican	1995	Member: Aging; Appropriations-Elementary & Secondary Educ; Elementary & Secondary Education; Small Business Empowerment & Workforce; Tourism & Conventions; Veterans' Affairs
91	Fulton, Peoria, Tazewell	Michael Unes	Republican	2011	Member: Aging; Cities & Villages; Insurance; International Trade & Commerce; Small Business Empowerment & Workforce; Tourism & Conventions; Transportation: Vehicles & Safety
92	Peoria	Jehan A. Gordon	Democratic	2009	Member: Consumer Protection; Elementary & Secondary Education; Small Business Empowerment & Workforce; Transportation: Regulation, Roads & Bridges; Veterans' Affairs
93	Adams, Brown, Cass, Hancock, Pike, Schuyler, Scott	Jil Tracy	Republican	2006	Member: Environmental Health; Financial Institutions; Judiciary I - Civil Law; Judiciary II - Criminal Law; Labor; Public Utilities; Redistricting; Special Investigating Committee; Tourism & Conventions
94	Fulton, Hancock, Henderson, Mason, McDonough, Mercer, Warren	Norine Hammond	Republican	2010	Member: Aging; Agriculture & Conservation; Appropriations-Higher Education; Consumer Protection; Higher Education; Human Services
95	DuPage, Kane	Mike Fortner	Republican	2007	Member: Bio-Technology; Cities & Villages; Environmental Health; Labor; Mass Transit; Public Utilities; Redistricting; Tollway Oversight
96	DuPage, Kendall	Darlene J. Senger	Republican	2009	Member: Appropriations-Elementary & Secondary Educ; Appropriations-Human Services; Elementary & Secondary Education; Financial Institutions; Insurance; Mass Transit; Pension Investments; Personnel & Pensions
97	Calhoun, Greene, Jersey, Macoupin, Morgan, Pike	Jim Watson	Republican	2001	Member: Health & Healthcare Disparities; Housing; Veterans' Affairs
97	Calhoun, Greene, Jersey, Macoupin, Morgan, Pike	C.D. Davidsmeyer	Republican	2012	
98	Christian, Fayette, Macoupin, Madison, Montgomery, Shelby	Wayne Rosenthal	Republican	2011	Member: Aging; Agriculture & Conservation; Appropriations-Elementary & Secondary Educ; Armed Forces & Military Affairs; Environment & Energy; Financial Institutions; Veterans' Affairs
99	Sangamon	Raymond Poe	Republican	1995	Member: Appropriations-Higher Education; Environment & Energy; Personnel & Pensions; Transportation: Regulation, Roads & Bridges
100	Logan, Menard, Sangamon	Rich Brauer	Republican	2003	Member: Appropriations-Higher Education; Financial Institutions; Tourism & Conventions; Transportation: Regulation, Roads & Bridges
101	Champaign, De Witt, Macon, McLean, Piatt	Adam Brown	Republican	2011	Member: Environment & Energy; State Government Administration; Telecommunications; Veterans' Affairs
102	Bond, Clinton, Effingham, Fayette, Madison, Shelby, St. Clair	Ron Stephens	Republican	1985	
102	Bond, Clinton, Effingham, Fayette, Madison, Shelby, St. Clair	Paul Evans	Republican	2011	Member: Appropriations-Human Services; Appropriations-Public Safety; Consumer Protection; Environmental Health; Labor; Small Business Empowerment & Workforce; Tourism & Conventions
103	Champaign	Naomi D. Jakobsson	Democratic	2003	Chair: Higher Education; Member: Adoption Reform; Appropriations-Higher Education; Elections & Campaign Reform; Environmental Health; Human Services
104	Champaign, Vermilion	Chad Hays	Republican	2010	Member: Aging; Agriculture & Conservation; Appropriations-Human Services; Health Care Availability Access; Higher Education; State Government Administration
105	Champaign, Ford, Iroquois, Livingston, McLean	Jason Barickman	Republican	2011	Member: Agriculture & Conservation; Appropriations-Public Safety; Bio-Technology; Consumer Protection; Higher Education; State Government Administration; Telecommunications
106	Livingston, Marshall, McLean, Tazewell, Woodford	Keith P. Sommer	Republican	1999	Member: Adoption Reform; Health Care Availability Access; International Trade & Commerce; Tourism & Conventions; Transportation: Regulation, Roads & Bridges
107	Bond, Clinton, Jefferson, Marion	John D. Cavaletto	Republican	2009	Member: Aging; Agriculture & Conservation; Appropriations-Higher Education; Appropriations-Public Safety; Elementary & Secondary Education
108	Clay, Edwards, Effingham, Hamilton, Jasper, Richland, Wayne, White	David Reis	Republican	2005	Member: Appropriations-Public Safety; Elections & Campaign Reform; Elementary & Secondary Education; Insurance; Judiciary II - Criminal Law
109	Clark, Crawford, Cumberland, Edgar, Effingham, Lawrence, Shelby, Wabash	Roger L. Eddy	Republican	2003	Member: Appropriations-Elementary and Secondary Education; Bio-technology; Elementary and Secondary Education; Health and Healthcare Disparities
109	Clark, Crawford, Cumberland, Edgar, Effingham, Lawrence, Shelby, Wabash	Brad E. Halbrook	Republican	2012	Member: Appropriations-General Service; Bio-Technology; Consumer Protection; Health & Healthcare Disparities; International Trade & Commerce; Small Business Empowerment & Workforce
110	Champaign, Coles, Douglas, Piatt	Chapin Rose	Republican	2003	Member: Appropriations-Higher Education; Environment & Energy; Environmental Health; Financial Institutions; Insurance; Redistricting; Select Committee on Discipline
111	Jersey, Madison	Daniel V. Beiser	Democratic	2004	Chair: Transportation: Regulation, Roads & Bridges; Member: Aging; Appropriations-Higher Education; Environment & Energy; Financial Institutions; Transportation: Vehicles & Safety
112	Madison, St. Clair	Dwight Kay	Republican	2011	Member: Appropriations-Public Safety; Financial Institutions; Judiciary I - Civil Law; Small Business Empowerment & Workforce; Transportation: Regulation, Roads & Bridges
113	St. Clair	Thomas Holbrook	Democratic	1995	
113	St. Clair	Scott E. Penny	Democratic	2011	Member: Appropriations-Public Safety; Cities & Villages; Transportation: Vehicles & Safety
114	St. Clair	Eddie Lee Jackson Sr.	Democratic	2009	Chair: Armed Forces & Military Affairs; Member: Appropriations-Elementary & Secondary Educ; Consumer Protection; Environment & Energy; Executive
115	Clinton, Jackson, Perry, Washington	Mike Bost	Republican	1995	Member: Appropriations-Higher Education; Executive; Health & Healthcare Disparities; Higher Education; Public Utilities; Veterans' Affairs
116	Monroe, Perry, Randolph, St. Clair	Dan Reitz	Democratic	1997	
116	Monroe, Perry, Randolph, St. Clair	Jerry F. Costello II	Democratic	2011	Member: Agriculture & Conservation; Armed Forces & Military Affairs; Consumer Protection; Tourism & Conventions; Veterans' Affairs
117	Franklin, Hamilton, Williamson	John E. Bradley	Democratic	2003	Chair: Labor; Revenue & Finance; Member: Judiciary I - Civil Law; Transportation: Regulation, Roads & Bridges
118	Alexander, Gallatin, Hamilton, Hardin, Johnson, Massac, Pope, Pulaski, Saline, Union, White	Brandon W. Phelps	Democratic	2003	Chair: Financial Institutions; Public Utilities; Member: Agriculture & Conservation; Armed Forces & Military Affairs; Counties & Townships; Environment & Energy; Health Care Licenses; Labor; Telecommunications; Veterans' Affairs

== See also ==
- 112th United States Congress
- List of Illinois state legislatures

== Works cited ==
- Illinois Secretary of State (2011). Illinois Blue Book 2011–2012. Archived from the original on July 28, 2012.
  - Legislative District Maps
  - Legislators' Portraits and Biographies
