= Jim Watson (Illinois politician) =

American politician

Member of the Illinois House of Representatives from the 97th district
- In office December 5, 2002 – December 3, 2012
- Preceded by: Tom Ryder
- Succeeded by: C. D. Davidsmeyer

Personal details
- Born: July 30, 1965 (age 60) Jerseyville, Illinois
- Party: Republican

Jim Watson (born 1965) is a former Republican member of the Illinois House of Representatives, representing the 97th district from 2001 through 2012. Watson's background includes teaching at both the high school and college level and 10 years of business experience.

== Biography ==
Watson was a member of the United States Marine Corps and United States Marine Corps Reserves from 1985 until 1991 including service in Iraq during Operation Desert Storm. Watson earned his B.A. and M.A. in history from Eastern Illinois University and his M.B.A. from University of Illinois Urbana-Champaign.

He was appointed to the Illinois House of Representatives to succeed Deputy Minority Leader Tom Ryder and was sworn into office on December 5, 2001 as the representative from the 97th district. The 97th district, located in southwestern Illinois, included all or parts of Calhoun County, Greene, Jersey, Macoupin, Madison, and Morgan counties. He was made the minority spokesman on the House Computer Technology Committee and also assigned to serve on the Agriculture, Appropriations—General Services, Revenue, and Transportation & Motor Vehicles Committees in the 92nd General Assembly.

In the 2002 general election, Watson won election to a full term in the reapportioned 97th district which added Pike County to the district.

In 2007, Watson re-enlisted in the Marine Corps as a staff sergeant. He was subsequently attached to the 1st Civil Affairs Group at Marine Corps Base Camp Pendleton. In February 2008, he deployed to Fallujah with the 1st Marine Expeditionary Force as part of the United States involvement in Iraq. His role in the Unit's Governance Cell, was to work with the local population, including tribal engagement, to build provincial and municipal governments and form functioning democratic governments. Over the protests of House Republican leadership, Watson chose to retain his seat while overseas making him the first Illinois state legislator to serve overseas since World War II.

Watson resigned from the Illinois House of Representatives to take a position as the Executive Director of the Illinois Petroleum Council, the state affiliate of the American Petroleum Institute. Local Republican leaders appointed C. D. Davidsmeyer, a member of the Jacksonville City Council, to succeed him in the 97th district for the remainder of the 97th General Assembly and as the representative from the 100th district for the 98th General Assembly. Watson's resignation was effective December 3, 2012. As of June 6, 2022, Watson continues to serve as the Executive Director of the Illinois Petroleum Council.

== Professional experience ==
- Vice-President, Marketing, Wareco Convenience Stores, 1991–2001
- Adjunct Professor, Strategic Management, MacMurray & Blackburn Colleges, Fall 1999
- Social Studies Teacher, Highland High School, 1990
- Graduate Assistant, Eastern Illinois University, 1989–1990
- Social Studies Teacher, Auburn High School, 1988–1989

== Political positions ==
In the General Assembly, Representative Watson has been a strong advocate for veterans’ rights, serving as the Republican Spokesman for the Veterans Affairs Committee. His other committee assignments include Financial Institutions, Elementary & Secondary Education, Telecommunications, Public Utilities (Republican Spokesperson), Gaming, and State Government Administration. In addition to veterans’ issues, Watson continues to focus on education issues, fiscal responsibility, and growing Illinois’ job market during his time in the General Assembly. Watson is a father of three and resides in Jacksonville. During his tenure, he served on the following committees: Public Utilities, Spokesman; Veteran's Affairs, Spokesman; Elementary & Secondary Education; Gaming; Financial Institutions; and Telecommunications.
