= Careen M. Gordon =

American politician

Member of the Illinois House of Representatives from the 75th district
- In office December 2003 – January 2011
- Preceded by: Mary K. O'Brien
- Succeeded by: Pam Roth

Personal details
- Born: September 6, 1972 (age 54) Morris, Illinois
- Party: Democratic
- Spouse: Jon (divorced)
- Education: John Marshall Law School; University of Illinois
- Profession: Prosecutor

Careen M. Gordon is a former Democratic member of the Illinois House of Representatives who served as a representative from the 75th district from her appointment in December 2003 until leaving office in January 2011.

== Early life ==
Gordon was born and raised in Morris, Illinois and graduated from Morris Community High School. She attended Purdue University and later graduated with a Bachelor of Arts from University of Illinois in political science and English. After receiving her law degree from John Marshall Law School she worked as an Assistant State's Attorney in Grundy County, Kankakee County and Will County. In 2001, she became an Assistant Attorney General in the Illinois Department of Justice's Criminal Division, where she worked until she was appointed to fill the vacancy caused by Mary O'Brien's resignation.

== Illinois House of Representatives ==
Gordon was appointed to represent the 75th district, which at that time stretched from Iroquois County in the southeast to LaSalle County in the northwest and included Bourbonnais, Braceville, Braidwood, Channahon, Chebanse, Coal City, Essex, Herscher, Coal City, Minooka, Morris, Seneca and Wilmington. She began her tenure as a member of the House Agriculture and Conservation, Appropriations—Elementary and Secondary Education, Commerce and Business Development, and Judiciary II—Criminal Law Committees.

She was voted out of office on November 2, 2010, when voters of the 75th district elected Republican Sue Rezin. (However, before she could take Gordon's seat in the House, Rezin was appointed to the State Senate; Gordon was ultimately succeeded by Pam Roth, appointed to take Rezin's place in the House.)
