= Pam Roth =

American politician

Pam J. Roth

Member of the Illinois House of Representatives from the 75th district
- In office January 12, 2011 – August 19, 2013
- Preceded by: Careen M. Gordon
- Succeeded by: John D. Anthony

Personal details
- Born: Washington, Iowa
- Party: Republican
- Spouse: Steve Roth
- Children: Two

Pam Roth is a former Republican member of the Illinois House of Representatives, representing the 75th district from 2011 until her resignation in August 2013.

== Early life and career ==
She has a degree in business administration and accounting from the University of Nevada, and was a certified public accountant for 12 years prior to joining the Illinois House. She served on the Saratoga District 60C school board, including being its president from 2009 to 2011.

== Political career ==
In the 2010 general election, Republican Sue Rezin defeated incumbent Democratic legislator Careen Gordon to serve from the 75th district in the 97th Illinois General Assembly. On December 10, 2010, Gary G. Dahl resigned from the Illinois Senate. The Legislative Committee of the Republican Party of the 38th District chose Rezin to fill the vacancy created by Dahl's resignation. To replace Rezin, the Republican Representative Committee of the 75th Representative District appointed Roth to serve in the 97th General Assembly.

During the 97th General Assembly, her House assignments were to the Committees on Aging; Appropriations—Elementary & Second- ary Education; Appropriations—Human Services; Consumer Protection; Elementary & Secondary Education; and Environmental Health. She was elected to the House in the 2012 general election. She resigned from the Illinois House in 2013 when she moved out of state. Her resignation was effective August 19, 2013. The Republican Party from the 75th Representative District appointed John D. Anthony to the vacancy.
