= Patricia Reid Lindner =

American politician (born 1939)

Member of the Illinois House of Representatives from the 50th district
- In office 1993–2009
- Preceded by: DeLoris Doederlein (65th)
- Succeeded by: Kay Hatcher (50th)

Personal details
- Born: November 29, 1939 (age 86) Aurora, Illinois, U.S.
- Party: Republican
- Spouse: George Philip
- Profession: Attorney

Patricia Reid Lindner (born November 29, 1939) was a Republican member of the Illinois House of Representatives, representing the 50th district from 1993 until her retirement at the end of her term in 2009. Lindner served on seven committees: Child Support Enforcement, Judiciary II- Criminal Law, Appropriations-Elementary and Secondary Education, Government Accountability and Streamlining, Adoption Reform, and the subcommittee on Methamphetamine.

She is the daughter of Charlotte Thompson Reid, who served as a U.S. representative for Illinois from 1962 to 1971.
