= Patrick Welch =

American politician (1948–2020)

Member of the Illinois Senate from the 38th district
- In office January 12, 1983 – January 12, 2005
- Preceded by: John E. Grotberg
- Succeeded by: Gary G. Dahl

Personal details
- Born: Patrick Daniel Welch; December 12, 1948 Chicago, Illinois
- Died: January 7, 2020 (aged 71)
- Party: Democratic
- Education: Chicago-Kent College of Law; Southern Illinois University
- Profession: Attorney

Patrick Daniel Welch (December 12, 1948 – January 7, 2020) was an American politician who served as a Democratic member of the Illinois Senate, representing the 38th district from 1983 to 2005. He served as an Assistant Majority Leader during his final term.

== Early life ==
Patrick Welch was born on December 12, 1948, in Chicago, Illinois. He attended college earning a Bachelor of Arts in Government from Southern Illinois University and a J.D. degree from the Illinois Institute of Technology’s Chicago-Kent College of Law.

== Illinois Senate ==
Welch first entered the Illinois Senate after winning what was thought to be a strongly Republican district against Betty J. Hoxsey in the closest Illinois Senate election of 1982. During his time in the Illinois Senate he was appointed to the Illinois Task Force on Global Climate Change, and proposed saving taxpayers money by eliminating the office of Lieutenant Governor of Illinois During his tenure Welch was a perennial target of the Illinois Republican Party, but managed to defeat major efforts to unseat him including a $500,000 spending effort in 1990 and a 700 vote margin of victory in 1994. He lost election in 2004 to Gary G. Dahl.

== Death ==
He died of complications of a stroke on January 7, 2020, at age 71. He was also suffering from dementia prior to his death.
