= Gary G. Dahl =

American politician (1940–2023)

Member of the Illinois Senate from the 38th district
- In office January 2005 – December 10, 2010
- Preceded by: Patrick Welch
- Succeeded by: Sue Rezin

Personal details
- Born: December 5, 1940 Lake Mills, Iowa
- Died: October 1, 2023 (aged 82) Peru, Illinois
- Party: Republican
- Spouse: Debbie
- Profession: business owner

Gary Glenn Dahl (December 5, 1940 – October 1, 2023) was an American politician. He was a Republican member of the Illinois Senate, representing the 38th district, from January 2005 until December 2010.

== Early life and career ==
Gary Glenn Dahl was born on December 5, 1940, in Lake Mills, Iowa. He served in the United States Army from 1958 to 1962. He was the owner of Double D Express Inc. and Double D Warehouse. As a small business owner, Dahl belonged to several groups connected to his work, including the National Federation of Independent Business, the Mid-West Truckers Association, Illinois Chamber of Commerce, the Illinois Trucking Association and the American Trucking Association. He also served as treasurer of the Distribution & LTL Carriers Association. Dahl won a number of awards including Red Cross’s Prairie State Good Neighbor Award (2004), Peru Rotary Community Service Award (1993), Rotarian of the Year (2003), Junior Achievement Award (2003), Innovative Solutions Workforce Development program (2000), Jimmy Carter Humanitarian Award (2000), Horizon House Appreciation Award (2003). Dahl is married to Debbie, father of five children, two stepchildren and 14 grandchildren. He lived in rural Granville.

== Illinois Senate ==
In 2004, Dahl won a surprise victory over longtime Democratic incumbent Patrick Welch in the 38th district. The 38th district, located in north-central Illinois, included all of Putnam County and parts of Iroquois, Kankakee, LaSalle, and Bureau counties. He was reelected in 2008. In 2009, Senator Dahl was the chief sponsor behind a resolution in the Illinois Senate to officially recognize Pluto as a planet and to declare March 13, 2009, as "Pluto Day" in the State. Dahl resigned from the Illinois Senate effective December 10, 2010. The Legislative Committee of the Republican Party of the 38th District appointed Representative-elect Sue Rezin to fill the vacancy for the remainder of the 96th General Assembly.
