= C. D. Davidsmeyer =

American politician

C.D. Davidsmeyer
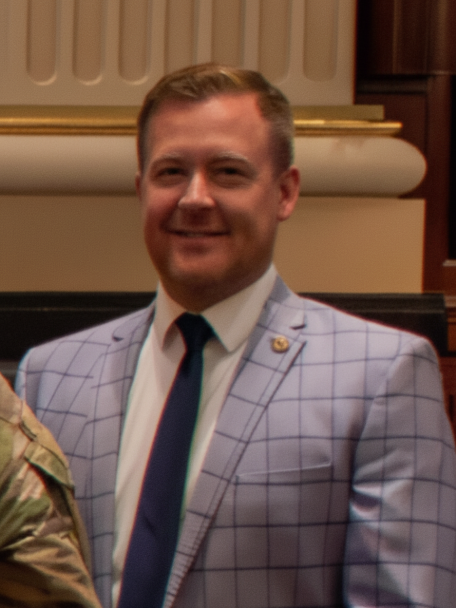
- Davidsmeyer in 2025

Member of the Illinois House of Representatives from the 100th district
- Incumbent
- Assumed office December 12, 2012
- Preceded by: Jim Watson

Personal details
- Born: July 12, 1979 (age 47) Jacksonville, Illinois, U.S.
- Party: Republican
- Spouse: Kristen Davidsmeyer
- Children: 2
- Education: Miami University
- Occupation: Politician

Christopher "C.D." Davidsmeyer (born 1979), is a member of the Illinois House of Representatives who has served in the Illinois House of Representatives since his appointment in December 2012. He represents the 100th district which includes all or parts of Adams County, Brown County, Calhoun County, Greene County, Jersey County, Macoupin County, Madison County, Morgan County, Pike County, and Scott County.

== Early life ==
Davidsmeyer was born in Jacksonville, Illinois on July 12, 1979 and graduated from Jacksonville High School. He received a Bachelor of Arts in political science from Miami University and worked as a legislative aide for Congressman John Shimkus. He served on the Jacksonville City Council from 2008 to 2012.

== Political career ==
In the 2012 general election, Republican incumbent Jim Watson of the 97th district was reelected to the Illinois House from the new 100th district. On December 3, 2012, Jim Watson resigned to take a position with the Illinois Petroleum Council. The Republican Representative Committee of the 97th Representative District appointed Davidsmeyer to fill the subsequent vacancy for the remainder of the 97th General Assembly and later as the representative from the 100th district for the 98th General Assembly. Davidsmeyer was sworn into office on December 12, 2012.

As of January 11, 2023, Representative Davidsmeyer is a member of the following Illinois House committees:

- Appropriations - Health & Human Services Committee (HAPH)
- Executive Committee (HEXC)
- Financial Institutions Committee (HFIN)
- Public Utilities Committee (HPUB) - Republican Spokesperson
- Commission on Government Forecasting and Accountability - (Co-Chairman)

As of 2024, Davidsmeyer is the chairman of the Morgan County Republican Party.
