= Tom Ryder (politician) =

American politician

Tom Ryder (born May 17, 1949) is an American lawyer and politician.

Ryder was born near Medora, Illinois in Macoupin County, Illinois. He received his bachelor's degree from Northern Illinois University and his Juris Doctor degree from Washington and Lee University School of Law. Ryder served in the Judge Advocate General's Corps with the Illinois National Guard. Ryder lived in Jerseyville, Illinois with his wife and family. He served in the Illinois House of Representatives from 1983 to 2001 and is a Republican. Ryder then resigned from the Illinois General Assembly in 2001 to be the vice-president of external affairs with the Illinois Community College Board.
