= Sue Rezin =

American politician

Member of the Illinois Senate from the 38th district
- Incumbent
- Assumed office December 14, 2010
- Preceded by: Gary G. Dahl

Personal details
- Born: Susan Marie Schipper; August 9, 1963 (age 62) Geneseo, Illinois, U.S.
- Party: Republican
- Spouse: Keith Rezin
- Children: 4
- Education: Augustana College (BA)
- Website: https://senatorrezin.com

Sue Rezin is a Republican member of the Illinois Senate, representing the 38th district since her appointment in December 2010. The 38th district includes Bureau, Putnam, LaSalle, Grundy, and Kendall counties in north central Illinois.

== Early and personal life ==
Susan M. Rezin was born October 27, 1962. She was raised on a farm near Geneseo, Illinois. She is a graduate of Augustana College, and managed her family’s real estate business. Rezin and her husband, Keith, have four children. They reside in Morris, Illinois.

== Illinois Senate ==
In the 2010 general election, Rezin defeated incumbent Democratic legislator Careen Gordon to serve from the 75th district in the 97th Illinois General Assembly. On December 10, 2010, Gary G. Dahl resigned from the Illinois Senate. The Legislative Committee of the Republican Party of the 38th District chose Rezin to fill the vacancy created by Dahl's resignation. Rezin was sworn into office on December 14, 2010. As no one can serve in both houses of the Illinois General Assembly, the Republican Representative Committee of the 75th Representative District appointed Pam Roth, the president of the Saratoga School Board, to serve in the 97th General Assembly in lieu of Rezin.

In 2015, she was appointed assistant leader in the Senate GOP Caucus. In 2021, Rezin was appointed Deputy Leader of the Senate GOP caucus. Rezin currently serves on the following committees: Early Childhood Education (Minority Spokesperson); Education; Energy and Public Utilities; Executive; Health and Human Services; Procurement; EX Consolidation; Tobacco; EX Special Issues.

== Other work ==
On a national level, Senator Rezin is an active member of the National Conference of State Legislatures (NCSL), which is a bipartisan organization that brings legislators and staff from across the county together to collaborate and share information to help craft the best solutions to problems states face. Senator Rezin currently serves on NCSL’s 63-member Executive Committee and Task Force on Energy Supply. Rezin also serves on the board of directors for the National Foundation for Women Legislators.

== 2020 Congressional campaign ==
On July 9, 2019, Rezin announced that she would be a candidate for the United States House of Representatives in the 14th congressional district in 2020 — even though a resident of the 16th — and planned on unseating first-term incumbent Democrat Lauren Underwood. She was narrowly defeated in the March 2020 Republican primary by fellow state Senator Jim Oberweis.

== Electoral history ==
2010 Illinois House of Representatives District 75 General Election
Party	Candidate	Votes	%
Republican	Sue Rezin	23,454	56.75
Democratic	Careen M. Gordon	17,876	43.25
Total votes		41,330	100.0

2012 Illinois State Senate District 38 General Election
Party	Candidate	Votes	%
Republican	Sue Rezin	23,454	56.75
Democratic	Careen M. Gordon	17,876	43.25
Total votes		41,330	100.0

2016 Illinois State Senate District 38 General Election
Party	Candidate	Votes	%
Republican	Sue Rezin	55,848	57.91
Democratic	Christine Benson	40,586	42.09
Total votes		96,434	100.0

2018 Illinois State Senate District 38 General Election
Party	Candidate	Votes	%
Republican	Sue Rezin	47,977	59.4
Democratic	Christine Benson	32,799	40.6
Total votes		80,776	100.0

2022 Illinois State Senate District 38 General Election
Party	Candidate	Votes	%
Republican	Sue Rezin	59,006	100.0
Total votes		59,006	100.0
