= Keith Farnham =

American politician

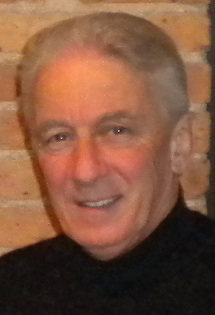

Member of the Illinois House of Representatives from the 43rd district
- In office January 6, 2009 – March 18, 2014
- Preceded by: Ruth Munson
- Succeeded by: Anna Moeller

Personal details
- Born: September 22, 1947 Piscataquis County, Maine, U.S.
- Died: June 18, 2017 (aged 69) FCC Butner, Granville County, North Carolina, U.S.
- Party: Democratic
- Spouse: Susan (married 1976)
- Children: 1 son
- Parent(s): Gertrude and Clyde Farnham
- Occupation: Business owner, lobbyist, real estate developer, labor union official

Military service
- Allegiance: United States
- Branch/service: United States Naval Reserve
- Years of service: 1964–1968

Keith Farnham (September 22, 1947 – June 18, 2017) was a Democratic former member of the Illinois House of Representatives who resigned from office and pleaded guilty of distributing child pornography in 2014.

== Early life ==
Farnham was born in Piscataquis County, Maine and grew up in Bangor. According to an article in the Bangor Daily News, he graduated from Bangor High School in 1967, but his 2008 campaign website stated that Farnham was on active duty in the United States Naval Reserve from 1964 to 1968, travelling to the Mediterranean and receiving an honorable discharge.

== Labor career ==
He became a commercial/industrial painting contractor for over 25 years, first working with other companies, then founding K&R Christopher in 1986. He was on the board of the Chicago Painting and Decorating Contractors of America (PDCA), was board president for the Finishing Contractors Association of Chicago and was involved in lobbying for the association. He also renovated the Elgin Dairy Company building into luxury condominiums.

== Illinois House of Representatives ==
In November 2008, he defeated two-term Republican Ruth Munson in the heavily Republican 43rd representative district of the Illinois House of Representatives, winning by 322 votes.

Farnham was in the Illinois House from January 2009 to March 2014. The district included portions of Elgin, Carpentersville, East Dundee and South Elgin. His House committee assignments included Aging, Appropriations (Human Services), Consumer Protection, Education Reform, State Government Administration, and Veterans' Affairs starting with the 96th General Assembly; Disability Services, Elementary & Secondary Education (and its Mandate Subcommittee), and Environment & Energy starting with the 97th General Assembly. He co-sponsored two bills to increase penalties for child pornography.

On March 13, 2014, U.S. Immigration and Customs Enforcement's Homeland Security Investigations raided Farnham's home and his district office in Elgin to execute federal search warrants.

Farnham ran unopposed in the 2014 Democratic primary, winning on Tuesday, March 18, but resigned the following day, saying that he had been "battling serious health issues for a number of years".

== Criminal case ==
On March 19, federal agents also took Farnham's State House chamber laptop. On March 20, the search warrant was made public.

On April 28, 2014, Farnham was charged. After receiving a tip that a Yahoo! e-mail address was being used to trade child pornography, investigators found chat logs from June 2013 to January 2014, in which the user bragged in detail about a sexual encounter with a 6-year-old girl and said that "12 is about as old as i can handle." The account's use was traced back to Farnham's home Comcast Internet service. At least two videos of child pornography were found on Farnham's Elgin legislative office computer. In addition to two videos showing victims as young as 2 or 3, investigators found over 2,750 images of child pornography.

Farnham pleaded guilty on December 5, 2014. Farnham's attorney said that Farnham's details of a 6-year-old girl were fictional and that Farnham "has never, never abused any child, never had any physical contact with a child." The attorney also said that Farnham has a "complex set of medical problems" including bladder cancer and hepatitis C, as well as pulmonary fibrosis for which Farnham was seeking to begin an experimental drug treatment, but "without a lung transplant, it's likely he's going to die in the penitentiary". The court continued Farnham's home confinement, which he had been on since his arrest, with stipulations that he not go on his condominium's patio or use the Internet, until his March 2015 sentencing hearing.

On March 19, 2015, Farnham was sentenced to eight years in prison. U.S. District Judge Edmond E. Chang also ordered Farnham to pay a $30,000 fine. He surrendered to the Federal Bureau of Prisons on May 19, 2015, to begin serving his sentence.

In February 2016, Farnham was sued by two minors who claim they appear in child pornography found on his computer.

== Death ==
Keith Farnham died on June 18, 2017, at Butner Federal Correctional Complex in North Carolina. He was 69. Farnham was suffering from bladder cancer, lung disease, and pulmonary fibrosis.
