= John D. Anthony =

American politician (born 1976)

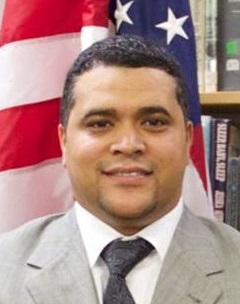

Member of the Illinois House of Representatives from the 75th district
- In office August 21, 2013 – June 17, 2016
- Preceded by: Pam Roth
- Succeeded by: David Welter

Personal details
- Born: April 13, 1976 (age 50) Chicago, Illinois
- Party: Republican
- Spouse: Deborah Anthony
- Education: Benedictine University
- Profession: Law Enforcement Officer

John D. Anthony (born April 13, 1976) is an American law enforcement official and politician. He served as the sheriff of Kendall County, Illinois prior to becoming a member of the Illinois House of Representatives. He represented the 75th district from August 2013 to June 2016. The district he represents includes all or parts of Minooka, Channahon, Joliet, Morris, Seneca, Marseilles, Sheridan and Plano. He was the first African American Republican member of the Illinois General Assembly since the Cutback Amendment came into effect in 1983.

Anthony resigned from the Illinois House of Representatives on June 17, 2016, to take a position with the Illinois Department of Corrections.
