= Naomi Jakobsson =

American politician (born 1941)

Member of the Illinois House of Representatives from the 103rd district
- In office January 2003 – January 2015
- Preceded by: Rick Winkel
- Succeeded by: Carol Ammons

Champaign County Recorder of Deeds
- In office December 1984 – December 1996
- Preceded by: Wilma Maloch
- Succeeded by: Barbara Frasca

Personal details
- Born: September 28, 1941 (age 85) Somerville, New Jersey
- Party: Democratic
- Spouse: Eric
- Children: Eight Children
- Education: University of Illinois
- Profession: Full Time Legislator

Naomi D. Jakobsson (born September 28, 1941) is a former Democratic member of the Illinois House of Representatives, who represented the 103rd District from 2003 to 2015. The 103rd District encompasses Urbana, and Champaign.

== Early life, education and career ==
Jakobsson earned her bachelor's degree from the University of Illinois at Urbana-Champaign in 1977 and went on to earn her master's degree in Teaching English as a Second Language in December 1979 from the same institution. From 1979 to 1984 she worked as an English as a Second Language teacher for the Urbana School District.

Jakobsson began her public career in 1984, when she was elected Champaign County Recorder of Deeds. She would serve as Champaign County Recorder of Deeds from 1984 to 1996. From 1996 to 1998 she served as the executive director of A Woman's Fund, a domestic violence shelter, and from 1999 to 2002 she worked for the university YMCA and the university YWCA first as development officer and then as executive director. As of 2002 Jakobsson served on the board of the Illinois Children's Home and Aid Society, as the Urbana Human Relations Commissioner, and on the board of the Champaign County Habitat for Humanity.

== Illinois General Assembly ==
Naomi was elected to represent the 103rd District in 2002. Jakobsson chaired the House Human Services Committee. Additionally, she served on the House Committees for Higher Education, Adoption Reform, Appropriations - Elementary and Secondary Education, and Appropriations - Higher Education. As a legislator Naomi has been active in sponsoring and supporting legislation that concerns the University of Illinois, the environment, and women's health. She voted against HB 148.

== Personal life ==
Naomi is married and is the mother of eight children, two by birth and six by adoption. Her son, Garret, died due to frontotemporal dementia, a neurodegenerative disease, in 2013 aged 46. Jakobsson had been at vigil by his bedside when she received word that a poll of members of the Illinois House showed that she was needed to cast the decisive vote in Springfield on the marriage equality bill she had co-sponsored. Her husband drove her to Springfield to cast that vote. During her drive to Springfield one member shifted his position, so the measure actually passed by two votes. Garret died approximately fifteen minutes before her return to him.
