= Joe Sosnowski =

American politician (born 1977)

Member of the Illinois House of Representatives from the 69th district
- Incumbent
- Assumed office January 2011
- Preceded by: Ronald A. Wait

Personal details
- Born: April 13, 1977 (age 49) Hanover Park, Illinois, U.S.
- Party: Republican
- Spouse: Roxanne Sosnowski
- Children: 3
- Education: Northern Illinois University
- Profession: Independent Fundraising Consultant

Joe Sosnowski (born April 13, 1977) is a member of the Illinois House of Representatives, first elected to represent the 69th district in 2010. The district includes all or portions of the municipalities of Rockford, Belvidere, Capron, Cherry Valley, Lakewood, Loves Park, Garden Prairie, Marengo, Union, Harvard, Hebron, Huntley, Poplar Grove, Richmond, Wonder Lake, and Woodstock.

== Biography ==
=== Early life ===
Joe Sosnowski was born April 13, 1977, in Hanover Park, IL. He grew up in Carol Stream, IL and graduated from West Chicago High School in 1995. In 1999, Sosnowski graduated from Northern Illinois University in DeKalb, Illinois with a Bachelor of Arts in English and a minor in Political Science.

=== Personal ===
Sosnowski formerly served as the Director of Institutional Advancement at Rockford Christian Schools in Rockford, a position he held until January 2020. He presently holds an Illinois Real Estate License, has previously worked in real estate management and leasing and is the former Vice President of Commercial Real Estate for Buckley Real Estate in Rockford. Sosnowski is a past regional board member of Children's Home and Aid, and was a 2008 recipient of the Rockford Chamber of Commerce's "40 Under 40" Award, which recognizes young leaders from the Rockford, IL region. Sosnowski married Roxanne Swedlund in 2001 and they have three children.

== Political career ==
Sosnowski served a four-year term as Seventh Ward Alderman on the DeKalb City Council from 1999 - 2003. In 2005, he was elected to the office of First Ward Alderman on the Rockford City Council, and in 2009, he was re-elected to that same office. While on the Rockford City Council, he served as the Chairman of the Planning and Development Committee and was also a member of the Codes and Regulations Committee. In his 2010 race for the 69th State Representative seat, Sosnowski was endorsed by the Chicago Tribune and the Rockford Register Star. He won the general election held on November 2, 2010 and was sworn into the Illinois House of Representatives on January 12, 2011.

As of January 2025, Representative Joe Sosnowski is a member of the following Illinois House committees:

- Cities & Villages Committee (HCIV)
- Elementary & Secondary Education: Administration, Licenses & Charter Committee (HELO)
- International Relations, Tourism, and Trade (HIRT)
- Mental Health & Addiction Committee (HMEH)
- Revenue & Finance Committee (HREF)
- Transportation: Regulation, Roads & Bridges (HTRR)
- Income Tax Subcommittee (HREF-INTX)
- Property Tax Subcommittee (HREF-HRPT)
- Sales Tax Subcommittee (HREF-HRST)
- Tax Credit and Incentives Subcommittee (HREF-HTCI)
