= John E. Bradley =

American politician (born 1971)

John Bradley
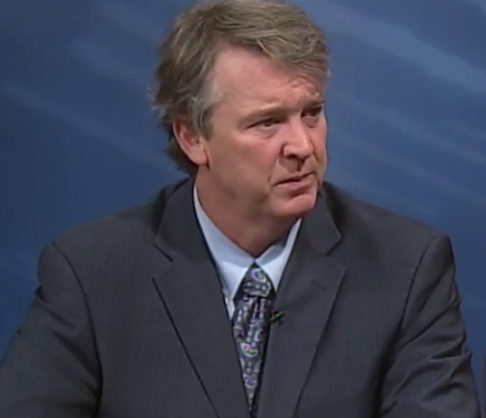

Member of the Illinois House of Representatives from the 117th district
- In office June 2003 – January 2017
- Preceded by: Gary Forby
- Succeeded by: Jim Kirkpatrick

Personal details
- Born: May 10, 1971 (age 55) Harrisburg, Illinois, U.S.
- Party: Democratic
- Spouse: Michelle Bradley
- Children: Three
- Education: University of Texas (B.A.); University of Illinois (J.D.)
- Profession: Attorney

John Bradley (born May 10, 1971) is a former Democratic member of the Illinois House of Representatives, representing the 117th District from his appointment in June 2003 to his resignation in January 2017. He served as an Assistant Majority Leader from 2013 to 2017. The 117th district, located in Southern Illinois and parts of the Metro Lakeland area, includes all or parts of Benton, Buckner, Bush, Cambria, Carbondale, Carterville, Christopher, Colp, Crab Orchard, Creal Springs, Energy, Ewing, Freeman Spur, Granville, Hanaford, Herrin, Hurst, Johnston City, Macedonia, Marion, McLeansboro, Mulkeytown, North City, Orient, Pittsburg, Royalton, Sesser, Spillertown, Stonefort, Thompsonville, Valier, West City, West Frankfort, Whiteash, and Zeigler.

He resigned in January 2017. His district manager Jim Kirkpatrick was appointed to succeed him and sworn in on January 4, 2017.
