= Renée Kosel =

American politician (born 1943)

Renee Kosel

Member of the Illinois House of Representatives
- In office 1997–January 7, 2015
- Preceded by: Larry Wennlund
- Succeeded by: Margo McDermed

Personal details
- Born: April 3, 1943 (age 83) Chicago, Illinois
- Party: Republican
- Spouse: Alfred

Renée Kosel (born April 3, 1943) is an American politician who served as a Republican member of the Illinois House of Representatives, from January 1997 until her resignation on January 7, 2015. While in the Illinois House of Representatives, Kosel previously served as an Assistant Republican Leader. The district includes all or parts of Frankfort, Homer Glen, Homer Township, Joliet, Mokena, New Lenox, Orland Park and Tinley Park. As of October 2012, Kosel is a member of the American Legislative Exchange Council (ALEC) previously serving as Illinois state co-chairman.

After winning the Republican nomination, incumbent Larry Wennlund opted to retire from the legislature rather than run in the 1996 general election. Republicans slated Kosel to be the Republican candidate. Kosel defeated Democratic candidate Lois Mayer.

She opted not to run in the 2014 general election. After the 2014 general election, but prior to the start of the 99th General Assembly, Kosel resigned effective January 7, 2015.
