= Kay Hatcher =

American politician

Member of the Illinois House of Representatives from the 50th district
- In office January 14, 2009 – January 14, 2015
- Preceded by: Patricia Reid Lindner
- Succeeded by: Keith R. Wheeler

Personal details
- Party: Republican
- Spouse: Steve
- Occupation: Marketing

Kay Hatcher is an American politician who was a Republican member of the Illinois House of Representatives, representing the 50th District since her election in 2008. She announced she will not seek reelection in 2014.

From Yorkville, Illinois, Hatcher served on the Kendall County, Illinois Board. She also served on the Oswego School Board.
