= 93rd Illinois General Assembly =

Illinois State legislative session from 2003 to 2005

| ← | 92nd | 94th | → |
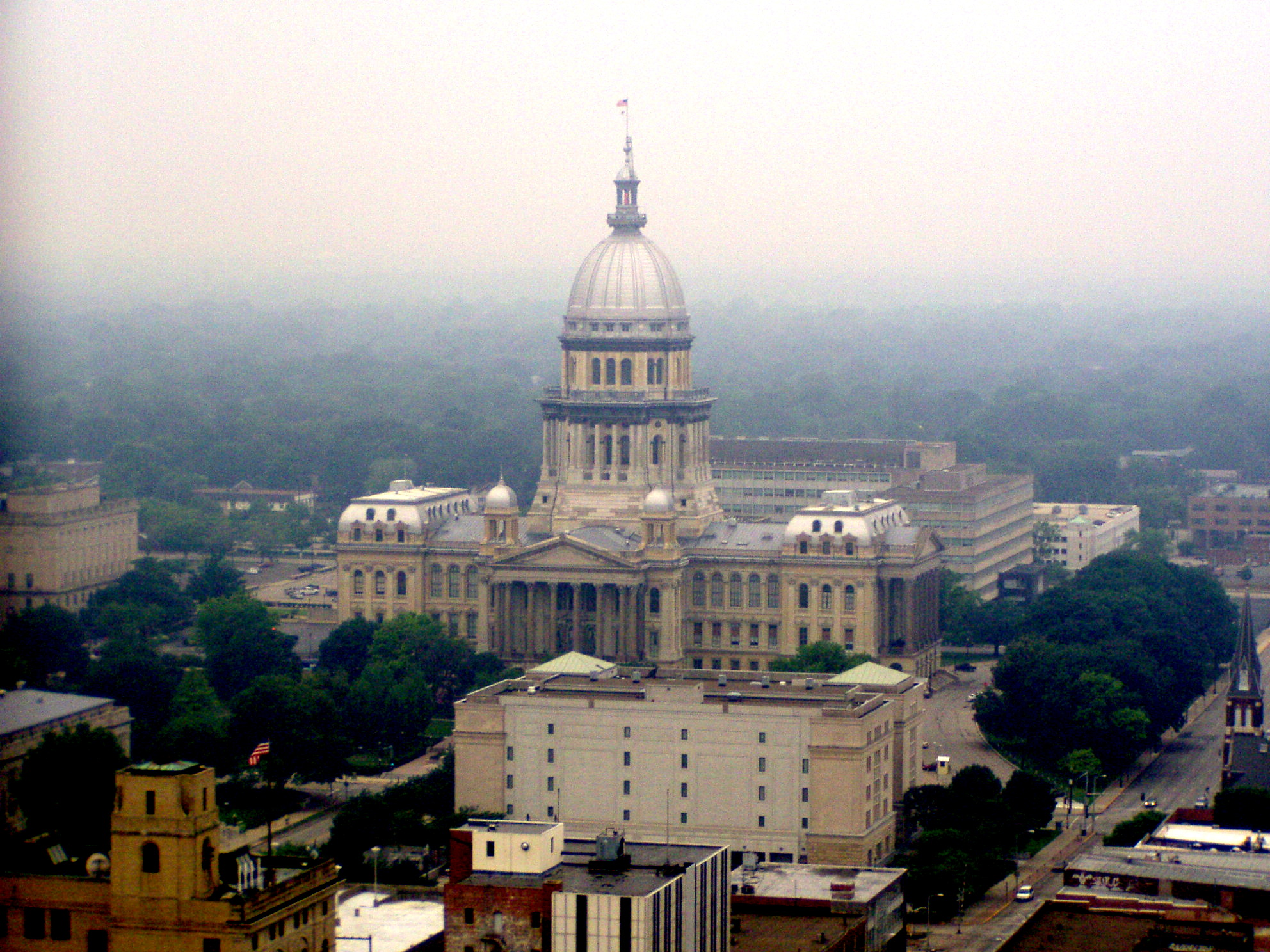
- The Illinois State Capitol in 2004

Overview
- Meeting place: Illinois State Capitol, Springfield
- Term: 2003 – 2005
- Election: 2002
- Website: Official site

Illinois State Senate
- President: Emil Jones, Democrat

Illinois House of Representatives
- Speaker: Michael J. Madigan, Democrat

The 93rd Illinois General Assembly, consisting of the Illinois Senate and the Illinois House of Representatives, existed from January 8, 2003 to January 11, 2005 during the first and second years of Rod Blagojevich's first term as governor of Illinois. The General Assembly met at the State Capitol.

In the regular session of the 93rd General Assembly, the Senate was in session for 160 legislative days, and the House was in session for 179 legislative days. The governor also called the General Assembly into special session 17 times. These special sessions included six days that were not part of any regular session.

All 118 members of the House, and all 59 members of the Senate, were elected in the 2002 election. While 2002 saw a nationwide swing toward the Republican Party, in Illinois the Democratic Party gained a government trifecta for the first time in decades. The Democrats gained control of the Senate for the first time since the election of 1992. Blagojevich was the first Democratic governor elected since 1972.

The apportionment of seats was based on the 2000 census. Both chambers had a Democratic majority.

The 93rd General Assembly was followed by the 94th General Assembly in January 2005.

== Legislation ==
The 93rd General Assembly enacted 1,102 bills into law.

Among these was the Health Care Justice Act, which sought "to insure that all residents have access to quality health care at costs that are affordable." The HCJA was spearheaded by the chair of the Senate Health and Human Services Committee, Barack Obama. Supporters and opponents regarded the struggle over the HCJA as foreshadowing the struggle over the federal Affordable Care Act during the Obama presidency. While originally intended to establish single-payer healthcare in the state, the act's ultimate form was more modest. The act created a task force and "strongly encouraged" the Illinois General Assembly to implement a health care access plan by July 1, 2007, that would meet eight objectives including providing access to a full range of healthcare services, maintaining and improving healthcare quality, and providing "portability of coverage, regardless of employment status". Much like its federal successor, the HCJA passed with no Republican support in the state Senate. The governor signed the HCJA into law on August 20, 2004.

== Illinois State Senate ==
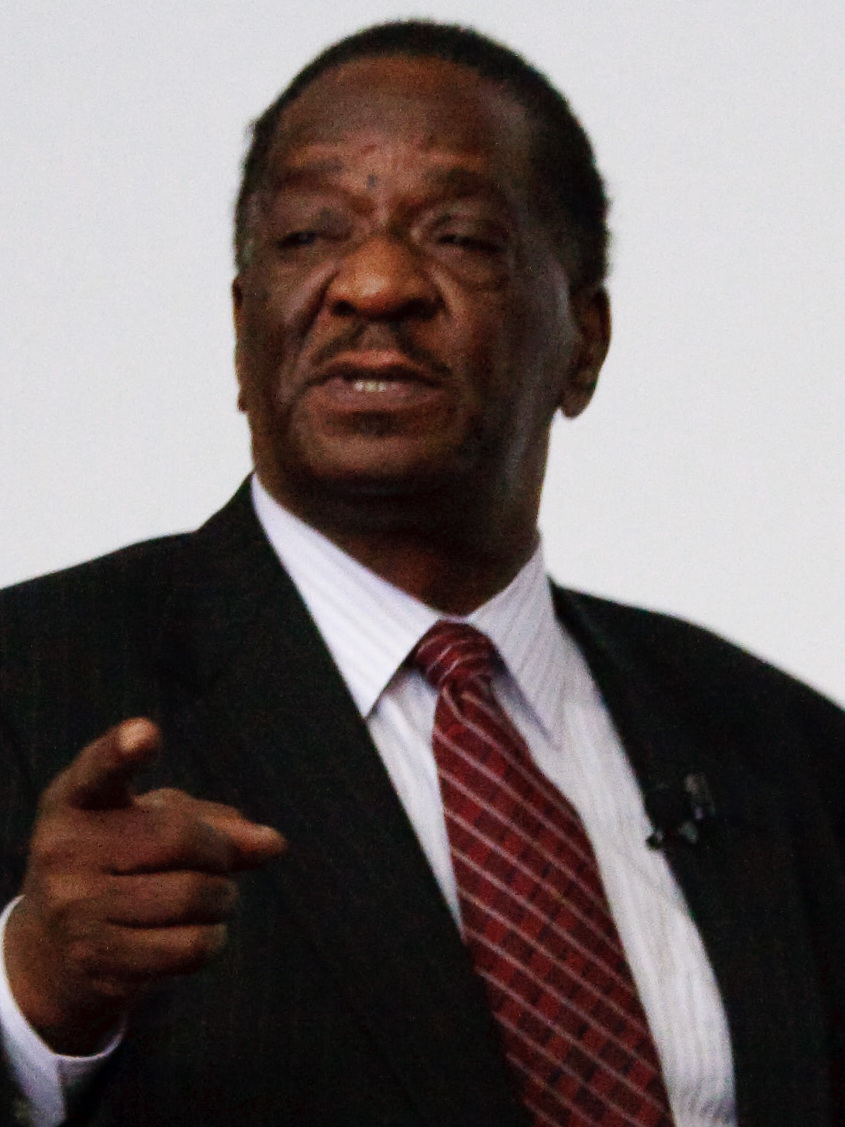
Emil Jones, President of the 93rd Senate

Under the 1970 Illinois Constitution, the Illinois Senate has 59 members. The members are elected to overlapping two- and four-year terms. Thirty votes are required for a majority, and 36 votes (or 60%) are required to override a veto or propose a constitutional amendment.

In the first year following redistricting, all 59 Senate seats are up for election. The Illinois legislative districts were redistricted in 2001. In the 2002 election, 39 Senators were elected to four-year terms, and 20 were elected to two-year terms.

=== Senate leadership ===
| Position | Name | Party | District |
|---|---|---|---|
| President of the Senate | Emil Jones | Democratic | 14 |
| Majority Leader | Vince Demuzio | Democratic | 49 |
| Minority Leader | Frank Watson | Republican | 51 |

=== Party composition ===
The Senate of the 93rd General Assembly consisted of 32 Democrats, 26 Republicans, and one Independent. The independent Senator, James T. Meeks of Chicago, caucused with the Democrats. He was elected on the Honesty and Integrity Party ticket.

| Affiliation | Members |
|---|---|
| Democratic Party | 32 |
| Republican Party | 26 |
| Independent | 1 |
| Total | 59 |

=== State senators ===
| District | Counties represented | Senator | Party | First year | Committees |
|---|---|---|---|---|---|
| 1 | Cook | Antonio Munoz | Democratic | 1999 | Chair: Licensed Activities; Public Pension Investments; Member: Financial Institutions; Transportation |
| 2 | Cook | Miguel del Valle | Democratic | 1987 | Chair: Education; Member: Appropriations I; Executive; Joint Task Force on Immigrants and Refugees |
| 3 | Cook | Mattie Hunter | Democratic | 2003 | Member: Alzheimer's Disease Task Force; Health & Human Services; Local Government; State Government |
| 4 | Cook | Kimberly A. Lightford | Democratic | 1998 | Chair: Financial Institutions; Member: Education; State Government |
| 5 | Cook | Rickey R. Hendon | Democratic | 1993 | Chair: Executive Appointments; Member: Environment & Energy; Executive; Labor & Commerce; Rules |
| 6 | Cook | John J. Cullerton | Democratic | 1991 | Chair: Judiciary; Member: Financial Institutions; Insurance & Pensions; Rules |
| 7 | Cook | Carol Ronen | Democratic | 2000 | Chair: Labor & Commerce; Member: Health & Human Services; State Government |
| 8 | Cook | Ira I. Silverstein | Democratic | 1999 | Chair: Executive; Member: Judiciary; Licensed Activities |
| 9 | Cook | Jeffrey M. Schoenberg | Democratic | 2003 | Chair: State Government; Member: Appropriations I; Appropriations II; Health & Human Services |
| 10 | Cook | James A. DeLeo | Democratic | 1993 | Member: Executive; Executive Appointments; Licensed Activities |
| 11 | Cook | Louis S. Viverito | Democratic | 1995 | Chair: Rules; Member: Executive; Financial Institutions; Mobile Home Task Force |
| 12 | Cook | Martin A. Sandoval | Democratic | 2003 | Chair: Joint Task Force on Immigrants and Refugees; Member: Appropriations I; Environment & Energy; Labor & Commerce; Local Government |
| 13 | Cook | Barack Obama | Democratic | 1997 | Chair: Health & Human Services; Member: Welfare |
| 13 | Cook | Kwame Raoul | Democratic | 2004 | Member: Judiciary; Local Government |
| 14 | Cook | Emil Jones Jr. | Democratic | 1983 | Member: Executive |
| 15 | Cook | James T. Meeks | Independent | 2003 | Member: Agriculture & Conservation; Appropriations II; Education; State Government |
| 16 | Cook | Jacqueline Y. Collins | Democratic | 2003 | Member: Appropriations I; Environment & Energy; Joint Task Force on Immigrants and Refugees; Revenue |
| 17 | Cook | Donne E. Trotter | Democratic | 1993 | Chair: Appropriations I Member: Appropriations II; Medicaid Managed Care Task Force; Revenue |
| 18 | Cook | Edward D. Maloney | Democratic | 2003 | Member: Appropriations I; Labor & Commerce; Revenue |
| 19 | Cook, Will | M. Maggie Crotty | Democratic | 2003 | Chair: Mobile Home Task Force; Revenue; Member: Executive Appointments; Health & Human Services; Licensed Activities |
| 20 | Cook | Iris Y. Martinez | Democratic | 2003 | Member: Appropriations II; Health & Human Services; Insurance & Pensions; Public Pension Investments |
| 21 | Cook, DuPage | Dan Cronin | Republican | 1993 | Member: Education; Labor & Commerce; State Government |
| 22 | Cook, Kane | Steven J. Rauschenberger | Republican | 1992 | Member: Appropriations I; Appropriations II; Environment & Energy; Executive Appointments; Joint Task Force on Immigrants and Refugees |
| 23 | DuPage | James Pate Philip | Republican | 1975 | |
| 23 | DuPage | Ray Soden | Republican | 2003 | |
| 23 | DuPage | Carole Pankau; Sworn in January 5, 2005. | Republican | 2005 | Member: Revenue |
| 24 | DuPage, Will | Kirk W. Dillard | Republican | 1993 | Chair: Judiciary; Member: Environment & Energy; State Government |
| 25 | Kane, Kendall, La Salle | Chris Lauzen | Republican | 1993 | Member: Appropriations I; Appropriations II; Revenue |
| 26 | Cook, Lake, McHenry | William E. Peterson | Republican | 1993 | Member: Insurance & Pensions; Joint Task Force on Immigrants and Refugees; Licensed Activities; Public Pension Investments; Revenue |
| 27 | Cook, Lake | Wendell E. Jones | Republican | 1998 | Member: Gaming-Revenue; Licensed Activities; Local Government; Revenue |
| 28 | Cook, DuPage, Kane | Doris Karpiel | Republican | 1984 | |
| 28 | Cook, DuPage, Kane | Kathleen L. Wojcik | Republican | 2003 | Member: Health & Human Services; Labor & Commerce |
| 29 | Cook, Lake | Susan Garrett | Democratic | 2003 | Member: Education; Health & Human Services; Transportation |
| 30 | Cook, Lake | Terry Link | Democratic | 1997 | Member: Financial Institutions; Joint Task Force on Immigrants and Refugees; Local Government; Transportation |
| 31 | Lake | Adeline Jay Geo-Karis | Republican | 1979 | Chair: Executive Appointments; Member: Dog & Cat Pop. Control Adv. Comm.; Financial Institutions |
| 32 | McHenry | Dick Klemm | Republican | 1993 | |
| 32 | McHenry | Pamela J. Althoff | Republican | 2003 | Member: Local Government; State Government |
| 33 | Cook | Dave Sullivan | Republican | 1998 | Member: Environment & Energy; Joint Task Force on Immigrants and Refugees; Licensed Activities; Mobile Home Task Force |
| 34 | Winnebago | Dave Syverson | Republican | 1993 | Member: Appropriations I; Appropriations II; Health & Human Services |
| 35 | Boone, De Kalb, Ogle, Winnebago | J. Bradley Burzynski | Republican | 1993 | Member: Appropriations I; Appropriations II; Education; Executive |
| 36 | Carroll, Henry, Mercer, Rock Island, Whiteside | Denny Jacobs | Democratic | 1986 | Chair: Gaming-Revenue; Insurance & Pensions; Member: Environment & Energy; Public Pension Investments; Revenue |
| 37 | Bureau, Henry, Knox, Marshall, Peoria, Stark, Woodford | Dale E. Risinger | Republican | 2003 | Member: Financial Institutions; State Government; Transportation |
| 38 | Bureau, Grundy, Iroquois, Kankakee, La Salle, Putnam, Will | Patrick Welch | Democratic | 1983 | Chair: Appropriations II; Member: Appropriations I; Environment & Energy; Gaming-Revenue; Medicaid Managed Care Task Force; Revenue |
| 39 | Cook, DuPage | Don Harmon | Democratic | 2003 | Chair: Dog & Cat Pop. Control Adv. Comm. Member: Appropriations II; Insurance & Pensions; Judiciary |
| 40 | Cook, Iroquois, Kankakee, Will | Debbie DeFrancesco Halvorson | Democratic | 1997 | Member: Agriculture & Conservation; Appropriations II; Executive; Transportation |
| 41 | Cook, DuPage, Will | Christine Radogno | Republican | 1997 | Member: Appropriations I; Appropriations II; Health & Human Services; Joint Task Force on Immigrants and Refugees; Medicaid Managed Care Task Force; Mobile Home Task Force; Public Pension Investments |
| 42 | Kane, Kendall, Will | Edward Petka | Republican | 1993 | Member: Executive; Executive Appointments; Gaming-Revenue; Judiciary; Rules |
| 43 | Will | Lawrence M. Walsh | Democratic | 1997 | Chair: Agriculture & Conservation; Alzheimer's Disease Task Force; Member: Joint Task Force on Immigrants and Refugees; Labor & Commerce; Local Government |
| 44 | Christian, De Witt, Logan, Macon, McLean, Sangamon, Tazewell | Bill Brady | Republican | 2002 | Member: Agriculture & Conservation; Alzheimer's Disease Task Force; Insurance & Pensions; Labor & Commerce; Public Pension Investments |
| 45 | Carroll, Henry, Jo Daviess, Lee, Ogle, Stephenson, Whiteside, Winnebago | Todd Sieben | Republican | 1993 | Member: Executive; Insurance & Pensions |
| 46 | Fulton, Peoria, Tazewell | George P. Shadid | Democratic | 1993 | Chair: Transportation; Member: Executive; Executive Appointments; Insurance & Pensions |
| 47 | Adams, Brown, Cass, Fulton, Hancock, Henderson, Mason, McDonough, Mercer, Pike, Schuyler, Scott, Warren | John M. Sullivan | Democratic | 2003 | Member: Agriculture & Conservation; Education; Transportation |
| 48 | DuPage, Kane, Kendall | Peter J. Roskam | Republican | 2000 | Member: Executive; Insurance & Pensions; Joint Task Force on Immigrants and Refugees; Judiciary; Rules |
| 49 | Calhoun, Christian, Fayette, Greene, Jersey, Macoupin, Madison, Montgomery, Morgan, Pike, Shelby | Vince Demuzio; Died April 27, 2004. | Democratic | 1975 | |
| 49 | Calhoun, Christian, Fayette, Greene, Jersey, Macoupin, Madison, Montgomery, Morgan, Pike, Shelby | Deanna Demuzio | Democratic | 2004 | Member: Appropriations I; Education; Executive Appointments |
| 50 | Logan, Menard, Sangamon | Larry K. Bomke | Republican | 1995 | Member: Agriculture & Conservation; Alzheimer's Disease Task Force; Local Government; Transportation |
| 51 | Bond, Champaign, Clinton, De Witt, Effingham, Fayette, Macon, Madison, McLean, Piatt, Shelby, St. Clair | Frank C. Watson | Republican | 1983 | Member: Executive |
| 52 | Champaign, Vermilion | Richard J. Winkel Jr. | Republican | 2003 | Member: Education; Judiciary; Licensed Activities |
| 53 | Champaign, Ford, Iroquois, Livingston, Marshall, McLean, Tazewell, Woodford | Dan Rutherford | Republican | 2003 | Member: Environment & Energy; Financial Institutions; Labor & Commerce |
| 54 | Bond, Clay, Clinton, Edwards, Effingham, Hamilton, Jasper, Jefferson, Marion, Richland, Wayne, White | John O. Jones | Republican | 2003 | Member: Agriculture & Conservation; Local Government; Transportation |
| 55 | Champaign, Clark, Coles, Crawford, Cumberland, Douglas, Edgar, Effingham, Lawrence, Piatt, Shelby, Wabash | Dale A. Righter | Republican | 2003 | Chair: Medicaid Managed Care Task Force; Member: Financial Institutions; Health & Human Services; Transportation |
| 56 | Jersey, Madison, St. Clair | William R. Haine | Democratic | 2002 | Chair: Local Government; Member: Environment & Energy; Judiciary; Licensed Activities |
| 57 | St. Clair | James F. Clayborne Jr. | Democratic | 1995 | Chair: Environment & Energy; Member: Appropriations II; Gaming-Revenue; Insurance & Pensions; Judiciary; Mobile Home Task Force; Public Pension Investments |
| 58 | Clinton, Jackson, Monroe, Perry, Randolph, St. Clair, Washington | David Luechtefeld | Republican | 1995 | Member: Agriculture & Conservation; Education; Executive Appointments |
| 59 | Alexander, Franklin, Gallatin, Hamilton, Hardin, Johnson, Massac, Pope, Pulaski, Saline, Union, White, Williamson | Larry D. Woolard | Democratic | 2001 | |
| 59 | Alexander, Franklin, Gallatin, Hamilton, Hardin, Johnson, Massac, Pope, Pulaski, Saline, Union, White, Williamson | Gary Forby | Democratic | 2003 | Member: Agriculture & Conservation; Education; Labor & Commerce |

== House of Representatives ==
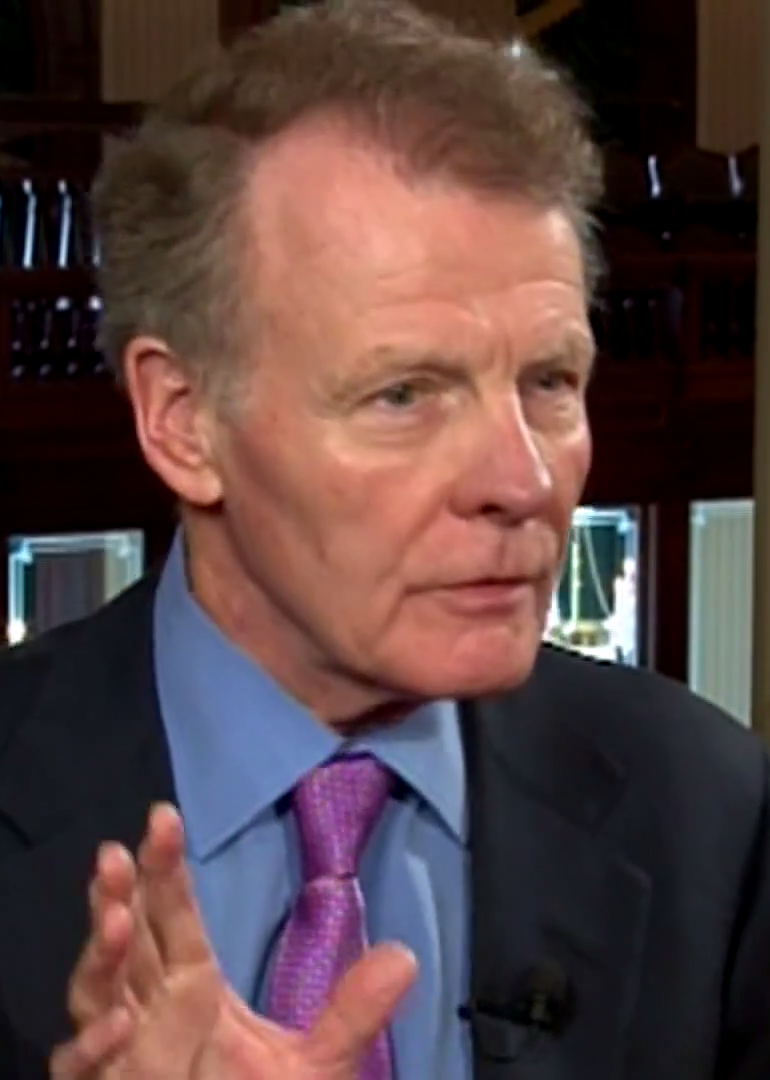
Michael Madigan, Speaker of the 93rd House

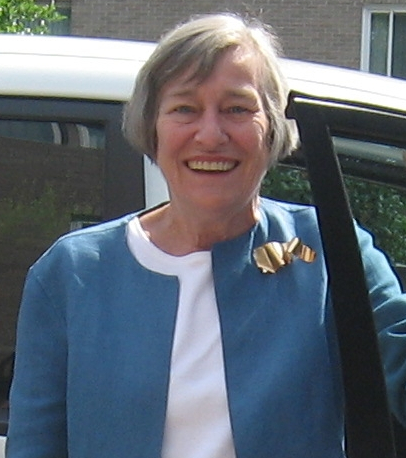
Majority Leader Barbara Flynn Currie

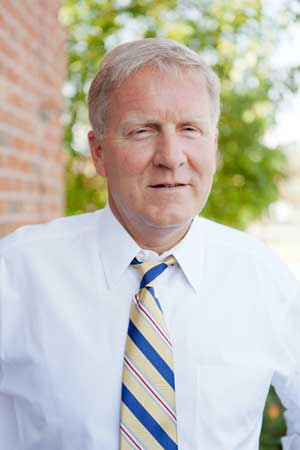
Minority Leader Tom Cross

The Illinois House has 118 members who are elected every two years. A simple majority of 60 votes is required to pass a bill; a 60% supermajority is required to override a veto or propose a constitutional amendment.

The composition of the 93rd House reflects the results of the 2002 election, in which the Democrats maintained their majority. 24 new members joined the chamber, and three Representatives who had previously been appointed to fill vacancies were elected for the first time. 89 House incumbents were re-elected.

=== House leadership ===
| Position | Name | Party | District |
|---|---|---|---|
| Speaker of the House | Michael J. Madigan | Democratic | 22 |
| Majority Leader | Barbara Flynn Currie | Democratic | 25 |
| Minority Leader | Tom Cross | Republican | 84 |

=== Party composition ===
The 93rd House consisted of 66 Democrats and 52 Republicans.

| Affiliation | Members |
|---|---|
| Democratic Party | 66 |
| Republican Party | 52 |
| Total | 118 |

=== State representatives ===
| District | Counties represented | Representative | Party | First year | Committees |
|---|---|---|---|---|---|
| 1 | Cook | Susana Mendoza | Democratic | 2001 | Member: Computer Technology; Consumer Protection; Higher Education |
| 2 | Cook | Edward J. Acevedo | Democratic | 1997 | Chair: Pension Fund Management Procurement; Member: Appropriations-Elementary & Secondary Education; Executive; Labor; Veterans Affairs |
| 3 | Cook | William Delgado | Democratic | 1999 | Chair: Fee For Service Initiatives; Human Services; Judiciary II - Criminal Law; Member: Appropriations-Elementary & Secondary Education; Appropriations-Public Safety; Labor; Pension Fund Management Procurement |
| 4 | Cook | Cynthia Soto | Democratic | 2001 | Member: Appropriations-Higher Education; Commerce & Business Development; Labor; Mass Transit for Northeastern Illinois; Pension Fund Management Procurement; Transportation & Motor Vehicles |
| 5 | Cook | Kenneth Dunkin | Democratic | 2002 | Member: Appropriations-Higher Education; Commerce & Business Development; Gaming; Insurance |
| 6 | Cook | Patricia Bailey | Democratic | 2002 | Member: Health Care Availability Access; Housing & Urban Development; Judiciary I - Civil Law; Judiciary II - Criminal Law; Tourism |
| 7 | Cook | Karen A. Yarbrough | Democratic | 2001 | Member: Appropriations-Public Safety; Elementary & Secondary Education; Insurance; Juvenile Justice Reform; Pension Fund Management Procurement |
| 8 | Cook | Calvin L. Giles | Democratic | 1993 | Chair: Elementary & Secondary Education; Member: Financial Institutions; Higher Education; Public Utilities |
| 9 | Cook | Arthur L. Turner | Democratic | 1981 | Member: Conflicts of Interest; Mass Transit for Northeastern Illinois; Qualifications Challenge Committee; Revenue; Rules |
| 10 | Cook | Annazette Collins | Democratic | 2001 | Chair: Juvenile Justice Reform; Member: Appropriations-Elementary & Secondary Education; Elementary & Secondary Education; Environment and Energy; Judiciary II - Criminal Law |
| 11 | Cook | John A. Fritchey | Democratic | 1996 | Chair: Judiciary I - Civil Law; Member: Health Care Availability Access; Mass Transit for Northeastern Illinois; Registration & Regulation; Transportation & Motor Vehicles; Veterans Affairs |
| 12 | Cook | Sara Feigenholtz | Democratic | 1995 | Chair: Appropriations-Human Services; Fee For Service Initiatives; Member: Housing & Urban Development; Human Services; Tourism |
| 13 | Cook | Larry McKeon | Democratic | 1997 | Chair: Labor; Member: Aging; Executive; Housing & Urban Development |
| 14 | Cook | Harry Osterman | Democratic | 2000 | Chair: Local Government; Member: Appropriations-Human Services; Elections and Campaign Reform; Elementary & Secondary Education; Fee For Service Initiatives; Housing & Urban Development |
| 15 | Cook | Ralph C. Capparelli | Democratic | 1971 | Member: Executive; Financial Institutions; Gaming |
| 15 | Cook | John D'Amico | Democratic | 2004 | |
| 16 | Cook | Lou Lang | Democratic | 1987 | Chair: Conflicts of Interest; Gaming; Qualifications Challenge Committee; Member: Judiciary I - Civil Law; Revenue |
| 17 | Cook | Elizabeth Coulson | Republican | 1997 | Member: Aging; Appropriations-Elementary & Secondary Education; Appropriations-Human Services; Fee For Service Initiatives; Health Care Availability Access; Registration & Regulation |
| 18 | Cook | Julie Hamos | Democratic | 1999 | Chair: Housing & Urban Development; Mass Transit for Northeastern Illinois; Member: Appropriations-Human Services; Environment and Energy; Fee For Service Initiatives; Judiciary I - Civil Law; Juvenile Justice Reform |
| 19 | Cook | Joseph M. Lyons | Democratic | 1996 | Chair: Financial Institutions; Member: Aging; Appropriations-Public Safety; Mass Transit for Northeastern Illinois; Tourism; Transportation & Motor Vehicles |
| 20 | Cook | Michael P. McAuliffe | Republican | 1997 | Chair: Veterans Affairs; Member: Appropriations-Public Safety; Financial Institutions; Registration & Regulation; Transportation & Motor Vehicles |
| 21 | Cook | Robert S. Molaro | Democratic | 2003 | Chair: Revenue; Member: Appropriations-Public Safety; Executive; Financial Institutions; Gaming; Transportation & Motor Vehicles |
| 22 | Cook | Michael J. Madigan | Democratic | 1971 | Member: Illinois State Toll Highway Authority |
| 23 | Cook | Daniel J. Burke | Democratic | 1991 | Chair: Executive; Member: Appropriations-General Service; Financial Institutions; Registration & Regulation |
| 24 | Cook | Frank Aguilar | Republican | 2003 | Member: Appropriations-Elementary & Secondary Education; Commerce & Business Development; Health Care Availability Access; Juvenile Justice Reform |
| 25 | Cook | Barbara Flynn Currie | Democratic | 1979 | Chair: Fee For Service Initiatives; Rules; Member: Elementary & Secondary Education; Qualifications Challenge Committee; Revenue |
| 26 | Cook | Lovana Jones | Democratic | 1987 | Member: Appropriations-Public Safety; Executive; Financial Institutions; Judiciary II - Criminal Law; Juvenile Justice Reform; Public Utilities |
| 27 | Cook | Monique D. Davis | Democratic | 1987 | Chair: Appropriations-General Service; Member: Appropriations-Higher Education; Elementary & Secondary Education; Financial Institutions; Public Utilities; Registration & Regulation |
| 28 | Cook | Robert Rita | Democratic | 2003 | Member: Appropriations-Public Safety; Computer Technology; Consumer Protection; Gaming; Insurance |
| 29 | Cook | David E. Miller | Democratic | 2001 | Chair: Pension Fund Management Procurement; Member: Appropriations-Human Services; Commerce & Business Development; Elementary & Secondary Education; Fee For Service Initiatives; Health Care Availability Access; Mass Transit for Northeastern Illinois; Transportation & Motor Vehicles |
| 30 | Cook | William Davis | Democratic | 2003 | Member: Appropriations-Elementary & Secondary Education; Appropriations-Higher Education; Higher Education; Local Government |
| 31 | Cook | Mary E. Flowers | Democratic | 1985 | Chair: Health Care Availability Access; Member: Appropriations-Elementary & Secondary Education; Commerce & Business Development; Fee For Service Initiatives; Human Services |
| 32 | Cook | Charles G. Morrow III | Democratic | 1987 | Chair: Appropriations-Public Safety; Member: Financial Institutions; Public Utilities |
| 33 | Cook | Marlow H. Colvin | Democratic | 2001 | Member: Appropriations-Public Safety; Elementary & Secondary Education; Insurance; Local Government; Pension Fund Management Procurement; Personnel & Pensions |
| 34 | Cook | Constance A. Howard | Democratic | 1995 | Chair: Computer Technology; Member: Appropriations-Elementary & Secondary Education; Fee For Service Initiatives; Health Care Availability Access; Higher Education; Human Services; Judiciary II - Criminal Law; Labor |
| 35 | Cook | Kevin Joyce | Democratic | 2003 | Member: Aging; Appropriations-Higher Education; Elementary & Secondary Education; Environment and Energy; Labor; Transportation & Motor Vehicles |
| 36 | Cook | James D. Brosnahan | Democratic | 1997 | Chair: Consumer Protection; Member: Develop Disabilities Mental Illness; Fee For Service Initiatives; Higher Education; Judiciary I - Civil Law; Transportation & Motor Vehicles |
| 37 | Cook, Will | Kevin A. McCarthy | Democratic | 1997 | Chair: Higher Education; Illinois State Toll Highway Authority; Member: Appropriations-Elementary & Secondary Education; Consumer Protection; Personnel & Pensions |
| 38 | Cook | Robin Kelly | Democratic | 2002 | Member: Appropriations-Human Services; Commerce & Business Development; Housing & Urban Development; Local Government |
| 39 | Cook | Maria Antonia Berrios | Democratic | 2003 | Member: Gaming; Health Care Availability Access; Insurance; Judiciary I - Civil Law |
| 40 | Cook | Richard T. Bradley | Democratic | 1997 | Chair: Personnel & Pensions; Member: Environment and Energy; Executive; Insurance; Judiciary II - Criminal Law; Pension Fund Management Procurement; Registration & Regulation |
| 41 | DuPage | Bob Biggins | Republican | 1993 | Member: Appropriations-General Service; Executive; Housing & Urban Development; Local Government; Qualifications Challenge Committee; Revenue |
| 42 | Cook, DuPage | Sandra M. Pihos | Republican | 2003 | Member: Appropriations-Elementary & Secondary Education; Appropriations-Human Services; Commerce & Business Development; Consumer Protection; Local Government |
| 43 | Cook, Kane | Ruth Munson | Republican | 2002 | Member: Appropriations-Human Services; Computer Technology; Health Care Availability Access; Housing & Urban Development; Pension Fund Management Procurement; Tourism |
| 44 | Cook | Terry R. Parke | Republican | 1985 | Member: Computer Technology; Consumer Protection; Environment and Energy; Insurance; Labor |
| 45 | DuPage | Carole Pankau | Republican | 1993 | Member: Gaming; Insurance; Revenue |
| 46 | DuPage | Lee A. Daniels | Republican | 1975 | Chair: Develop Disabilities Mental Illness; Fee For Service Initiatives |
| 47 | DuPage | Patricia R. Bellock | Republican | 1999 | Member: Develop Disabilities Mental Illness; Fee For Service Initiatives; Financial Institutions; Human Services; Juvenile Justice Reform; Labor |
| 48 | DuPage, Will | James H. Meyer | Republican | 1993 | Member: Environment and Energy; Financial Institutions; Illinois State Toll Highway Authority; Local Government; Public Utilities; Veterans Affairs |
| 49 | Kane | Timothy L. Schmitz | Republican | 1999 | Member: Appropriations-Elementary & Secondary Education; Appropriations-Public Safety; Conflicts of Interest; Gaming; Personnel & Pensions |
| 50 | Kane, Kendall, La Salle | Patricia Reid Lindner | Republican | 1993 | Member: Human Services; Judiciary II - Criminal Law; Juvenile Justice Reform; State Government Administration |
| 51 | Lake | Ed Sullivan Jr. | Republican | 2003 | Member: Computer Technology; Elections and Campaign Reform; Human Services; Mass Transit for Northeastern Illinois; Public Utilities; Registration & Regulation; Revenue |
| 52 | Cook, Lake, McHenry | Mark H. Beaubien Jr. | Republican | 1996 | Member: Gaming; Pension Fund Management Procurement; Revenue |
| 53 | Cook, Lake | Sidney H. Mathias | Republican | 1999 | Member: Aging; Appropriations-Public Safety; Financial Institutions; Illinois State Toll Highway Authority; Judiciary I - Civil Law; Local Government; Mass Transit for Northeastern Illinois; Transportation & Motor Vehicles |
| 54 | Cook | Suzanne Bassi | Republican | 1999 | Member: Aging; Appropriations-Human Services; Elementary & Secondary Education; Fee For Service Initiatives; Illinois State Toll Highway Authority; Mass Transit for Northeastern Illinois; Tourism; Transportation & Motor Vehicles |
| 55 | Cook, DuPage, Kane | John J. Millner | Republican | 2005 | Member: Appropriations-Public Safety; Consumer Protection; Judiciary II - Criminal Law; Registration & Regulation; Transportation & Motor Vehicles |
| 56 | Cook, DuPage | Kathleen L. Wojcik | Republican | 1983 | |
| 56 | Cook, DuPage | Paul D. Froehlich | Republican | 2003 | Member: Appropriations-Public Safety; Develop Disabilities Mental Illness; Housing & Urban Development; Judiciary I - Civil Law; Local Government |
| 57 | Cook | Elaine Nekritz | Democratic | 2003 | Member: Appropriations-Public Safety; Elections and Campaign Reform; Housing & Urban Development; Judiciary I - Civil Law; Local Government |
| 58 | Lake | Karen May | Democratic | 2001 | Member: Appropriations-Higher Education; Health Care Availability Access; Illinois State Toll Highway Authority; Judiciary I - Civil Law; Local Government; Public Utilities |
| 59 | Cook, Lake | Kathleen A. Ryg | Democratic | 2003 | Member: Appropriations-Public Safety; Develop Disabilities Mental Illness; Health Care Availability Access; Housing & Urban Development; Human Services; Illinois State Toll Highway Authority; Local Government; Mass Transit for Northeastern Illinois |
| 60 | Lake | Eddie Washington | Democratic | 2003 | Member: Appropriations-Human Services; Appropriations-Public Safety; Consumer Protection; Develop Disabilities Mental Illness; State Government Administration |
| 61 | Lake | JoAnn D. Osmond | Republican | 2003 | Member: Appropriations-Public Safety; Elections and Campaign Reform; Illinois State Toll Highway Authority; Insurance; Judiciary I - Civil Law; Mass Transit for Northeastern Illinois; Tourism |
| 62 | Lake | Robert W. Churchill | Republican | 1983 | Member: Consumer Protection; Develop Disabilities Mental Illness; Environment and Energy; Fee For Service Initiatives |
| 63 | McHenry | Jack D. Franks | Democratic | 1999 | Chair: State Government Administration; Member: Aging; Appropriations-Public Safety |
| 64 | McHenry | Rosemary Kurtz | Republican | 2001 | Member: Appropriations-Elementary & Secondary Education; Develop Disabilities Mental Illness; Health Care Availability Access; Human Services; Local Government |
| 65 | Cook | Rosemary Mulligan | Republican | 1993 | Member: Appropriations-Elementary & Secondary Education; Appropriations-Human Services; Elementary & Secondary Education; Fee For Service Initiatives; Health Care Availability Access; Registration & Regulation |
| 66 | Cook | Carolyn H. Krause | Republican | 1993 | Member: Elementary & Secondary Education; Fee For Service Initiatives; Health Care Availability Access; Public Utilities; Registration & Regulation |
| 67 | Winnebago | Charles E. Jefferson | Democratic | 2001 | Member: Aging; Elections and Campaign Reform; Housing & Urban Development; Illinois State Toll Highway Authority; Labor |
| 68 | Winnebago | Dave Winters | Republican | 1995 | Member: Agriculture and Conservation; Commerce & Business Development; Executive; Labor; Pension Fund Management Procurement |
| 69 | Boone, De Kalb, Winnebago | Ronald A. Wait | Republican | 1983 | Member: Aging; Appropriations-Public Safety; Elections and Campaign Reform; Judiciary I - Civil Law; Judiciary II - Criminal Law; Transportation & Motor Vehicles |
| 70 | De Kalb, Ogle | David A. Wirsing | Republican | 1993 | |
| 70 | De Kalb, Ogle | Robert W. Pritchard | Republican | 2003 | Member: Agriculture and Conservation; Appropriations-Higher Education; Higher Education; Housing & Urban Development; Local Government |
| 71 | Carroll, Henry, Rock Island, Whiteside | Mike Boland | Democratic | 1995 | Chair: Elections and Campaign Reform; Member: Appropriations-General Service; Appropriations-Higher Education; Gaming |
| 72 | Mercer, Rock Island | Joel Brunsvold | Democratic | 1983 | |
| 72 | Mercer, Rock Island | Patrick Verschoore | Democratic | 2003 | Member: Agriculture and Conservation; Appropriations-General Service; Computer Technology; State Government Administration |
| 73 | Bureau, Marshall, Peoria, Woodford | David R. Leitch | Republican | 1986 | Member: Appropriations-Human Services; Environment and Energy; Fee For Service Initiatives; Housing & Urban Development; Personnel & Pensions |
| 74 | Bureau, Henry, Knox, Stark | Donald L. Moffitt | Republican | 1993 | Member: Agriculture and Conservation; Commerce & Business Development; Elementary & Secondary Education; Local Government; Transportation & Motor Vehicles; Veterans Affairs |
| 75 | Grundy, Iroquois, Kankakee, La Salle, Will | Careen Gordon | Democratic | 2003 | Member: Agriculture and Conservation; Appropriations-Elementary & Secondary Education; Judiciary II - Criminal Law |
| 75 | Grundy, Iroquois, Kankakee, La Salle, Will | Mary K. O'Brien | Democratic | 1997 | |
| 76 | Bureau, La Salle, Putnam | Frank J. Mautino | Democratic | 1991 | Chair: Insurance; Member: Agriculture and Conservation; Appropriations-Public Safety; Local Government; Veterans Affairs |
| 77 | Cook, DuPage | Angelo Saviano | Republican | 1993 | Chair: Registration & Regulation; Member: Aging; Appropriations-Public Safety; Executive; Public Utilities |
| 78 | Cook | Deborah L. Graham | Democratic | 2003 | Member: Appropriations-Human Services; Health Care Availability Access; Housing & Urban Development; Juvenile Justice Reform |
| 79 | Iroquois, Kankakee, Will | John Philip Novak | Democratic | 1987 | |
| 79 | Iroquois, Kankakee, Will | Lisa M. Dugan | Democratic | 2003 | Member: Agriculture and Conservation; Appropriations-Elementary & Secondary Education; Commerce & Business Development; Veterans Affairs |
| 80 | Cook, Will | George Scully Jr. | Democratic | 1997 | Chair: Commerce & Business Development; Member: Gaming; Judiciary I - Civil Law; Public Utilities |
| 81 | Cook, DuPage, Will | Renee Kosel | Republican | 1997 | Member: Appropriations-Elementary & Secondary Education; Elementary & Secondary Education; Environment and Energy; Financial Institutions; Illinois State Toll Highway Authority; Registration & Regulation |
| 82 | Will | Eileen Lyons | Republican | 1995 | Member: Fee For Service Initiatives; Judiciary II - Criminal Law; Juvenile Justice Reform; Public Utilities; Registration & Regulation |
| 83 | Kane | Linda Chapa LaVia | Democratic | 2003 | Member: Appropriations-Elementary & Secondary Education; Commerce & Business Development; Health Care Availability Access; Illinois State Toll Highway Authority; State Government Administration; Veterans Affairs |
| 84 | Kendall, Will | Tom Cross | Republican | 1993 | |
| 85 | Will | Brent Hassert | Republican | 1993 | Member: Conflicts of Interest; Executive; Gaming; Health Care Availability Access; Illinois State Toll Highway Authority; Mass Transit for Northeastern Illinois; Qualifications Challenge Committee; Rules |
| 86 | Will | Jack McGuire | Democratic | 1991 | Chair: Aging; Member: Appropriations-Public Safety; Consumer Protection; Illinois State Toll Highway Authority; Tourism |
| 87 | Christian, De Witt, Logan, Macon, McLean, Sangamon, Tazewell | Bill Mitchell | Republican | 1999 | Member: Appropriations-Public Safety; Financial Institutions; Insurance |
| 88 | McLean | Dan Brady | Republican | 2001 | Member: Appropriations-Higher Education; Elections and Campaign Reform; Higher Education; Insurance; State Government Administration |
| 89 | Carroll, Jo Daviess, Ogle, Winnebago, Stephenson | Jim Sacia | Republican | 2003 | Member: Agriculture and Conservation; Appropriations-Elementary & Secondary Education; Commerce & Business Development; Judiciary I - Civil Law; Judiciary II - Criminal Law; Pension Fund Management Procurement; Veterans Affairs |
| 90 | Henry, Lee, Ogle, Whiteside | Jerry L. Mitchell | Republican | 1995 | Member: Aging; Appropriations-Elementary & Secondary Education; Commerce & Business Development; Elementary & Secondary Education; Tourism |
| 91 | Fulton, Peoria, Tazewell | Michael K. Smith | Democratic | 1995 | Chair: Appropriations-Elementary & Secondary Education; Member: Agriculture and Conservation; Elementary & Secondary Education; Personnel & Pensions; State Government Administration |
| 92 | Peoria | Ricca Slone | Democratic | 1997 | Chair: Appropriations-Higher Education; Member: Environment and Energy; Health Care Availability Access; Housing & Urban Development; Local Government |
| 93 | Adams, Brown, Cass, Hancock, Pike, Schuyler, Scott | Art Tenhouse | Republican | 1989 | Member: Consumer Protection; Environment and Energy; Fee For Service Initiatives; Labor; Transportation & Motor Vehicles |
| 94 | Fulton, Hancock, Henderson, Mason, McDonough, Mercer, Warren | Richard P. Myers | Republican | 1995 | Member: Agriculture and Conservation; Appropriations-Higher Education; Higher Education; Public Utilities; State Government Administration |
| 95 | DuPage, Kane | Randall M. Hultgren | Republican | 1999 | Member: Appropriations-Public Safety; Financial Institutions; Judiciary I - Civil Law; Labor; Public Utilities |
| 96 | DuPage, Kendall | Joe Dunn | Republican | 2003 | Member: Appropriations-General Service; Financial Institutions; Gaming; Insurance; Mass Transit for Northeastern Illinois; Pension Fund Management Procurement |
| 97 | Calhoun, Greene, Jersey, Macoupin, Morgan, Pike | Jim Watson | Republican | 2001 | Member: Commerce & Business Development; Elementary & Secondary Education; Fee For Service Initiatives; Local Government; Transportation & Motor Vehicles; Veterans Affairs |
| 98 | Christian, Fayette, Macoupin, Madison, Montgomery, Shelby | Gary Hannig | Democratic | 1979 | Member: Computer Technology; Environment and Energy; Revenue; Rules |
| 99 | Sangamon | Raymond Poe | Republican | 1995 | Member: Appropriations-Higher Education; Commerce & Business Development; Housing & Urban Development; Pension Fund Management Procurement; Personnel & Pensions |
| 100 | Logan, Menard, Sangamon | Rich Brauer | Republican | 2003 | Member: Agriculture and Conservation; Appropriations-Elementary & Secondary Education; Appropriations-Higher Education; Personnel & Pensions; State Government Administration |
| 101 | Champaign, De Witt, Macon, McLean, Piatt | Julie A. Curry | Democratic | 1995 | |
| 101 | Champaign, De Witt, Macon, McLean, Piatt | Robert F. Flider | Democratic | 2003 | Member: Agriculture and Conservation; Appropriations-Elementary & Secondary Education; Commerce & Business Development; Local Government; Veterans Affairs |
| 102 | Bond, Clinton, Effingham, Fayette, Madison, Shelby, St. Clair | Ron Stephens | Republican | 1985 | Member: Appropriations-Public Safety; Gaming; Health Care Availability Access; Housing & Urban Development; Veterans Affairs |
| 103 | Champaign | Naomi D. Jakobsson | Democratic | 2003 | Member: Appropriations-Elementary & Secondary Education; Appropriations-Higher Education; Develop Disabilities Mental Illness; Elections and Campaign Reform; Higher Education; State Government Administration |
| 104 | Champaign, Vermilion | William B. Black | Republican | 1986 | Member: Conflicts of Interest; Executive; Higher Education; Rules; Transportation & Motor Vehicles |
| 105 | Champaign, Ford, Iroquois, Livingston, McLean | Shane Cultra | Republican | 2003 | Member: Agriculture and Conservation; Appropriations-Elementary & Secondary Education; Appropriations-Higher Education; Judiciary I - Civil Law; Labor |
| 106 | Livingston, Marshall, McLean, Tazewell, Woodford | Keith P. Sommer | Republican | 1999 | Member: Appropriations-General Service; Health Care Availability Access; Housing & Urban Development; Local Government; Veterans Affairs |
| 107 | Bond, Clinton, Jefferson, Marion | Kurt M. Granberg | Democratic | 1987 | Member: Public Utilities; Registration & Regulation |
| 108 | Clay, Edwards, Effingham, Hamilton, Jasper, Richland, Wayne, White | Charles A. Hartke | Democratic | 1985 | |
| 108 | Clay, Edwards, Effingham, Hamilton, Jasper, Richland, Wayne, White | William J. Grunloh | Democratic | 2003 | Member: Agriculture and Conservation; Appropriations-Elementary & Secondary Education; Commerce & Business Development; Local Government; Veterans Affairs |
| 109 | Clark, Crawford, Cumberland, Edgar, Effingham, Lawrence, Shelby, Wabash | Roger L. Eddy | Republican | 2003 | Member: Agriculture and Conservation; Appropriations-Elementary & Secondary Education; Appropriations-Higher Education; Computer Technology; Elementary & Secondary Education |
| 110 | Champaign, Coles, Douglas, Piatt | Chapin Rose | Republican | 2003 | Member: Higher Education; Housing & Urban Development; Judiciary I - Civil Law; Judiciary II - Criminal Law; State Government Administration |
| 111 | Jersey, Madison | Steve Davis | Democratic | 1995 | |
| 111 | Jersey, Madison | Daniel V. Beiser | Democratic | 2004 | |
| 112 | Madison, St. Clair | Jay C. Hoffman | Democratic | 1991 | Chair: Transportation & Motor Vehicles; Member: Judiciary I - Civil Law; Labor |
| 113 | St. Clair | Thomas Holbrook | Democratic | 1995 | Chair: Environment and Energy; Tourism; Member: Aging; Financial Institutions; Public Utilities |
| 114 | St. Clair | Wyvetter H. Younge | Democratic | 1975 | Member: Appropriations-Elementary & Secondary Education; Appropriations-Higher Education; Commerce & Business Development |
| 115 | Clinton, Jackson, Perry, Washington | Mike Bost | Republican | 1995 | Member: Appropriations-Higher Education; Higher Education; Public Utilities; Veterans Affairs |
| 116 | Monroe, Perry, Randolph, St. Clair | Dan Reitz | Democratic | 1997 | Chair: Agriculture and Conservation; Member: Environment and Energy; Personnel & Pensions; Registration & Regulation; Transportation & Motor Vehicles |
| 117 | Franklin, Hamilton, Williamson | Gary Forby | Democratic | 2001 | |
| 117 | Franklin, Hamilton, Williamson | John E. Bradley | Democratic | 2003 | Member: Agriculture and Conservation; Appropriations-Elementary & Secondary Education; Commerce & Business Development; Judiciary I - Civil Law; Tourism |
| 118 | Alexander, Gallatin, Hamilton, Hardin, Johnson, Massac, Pope, Pulaski, Saline, Union, White | Brandon W. Phelps | Democratic | 2003 | Member: Agriculture and Conservation; Appropriations-Public Safety; Insurance; Local Government; Veterans Affairs |

== See also ==
- 108th United States Congress
- List of Illinois state legislatures

== Works cited ==
- Illinois Blue Book, 2003-2004. Illinois Secretary of State. 2003.
  - Legislative Districts of Illinois
  - Legislators' Portraits and Biographies
