= 94th Illinois General Assembly =

Illinois state legislative session from 2005 to 2006

←	93rd	95th	→
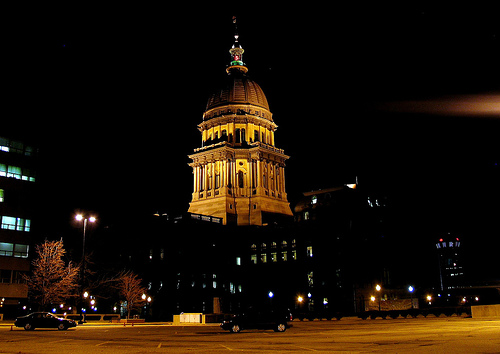
- The Illinois State Capitol in 2006

Overview
- Meeting place: Illinois State Capitol, Springfield
- Term: 2005 – 2007
- Election: 2004
- Website: Official site

Illinois Senate
- President: Emil Jones, Democrat

Illinois House of Representatives
- Speaker: Michael J. Madigan, Democrat

The 94th Illinois General Assembly, consisting of the Illinois Senate and the Illinois House of Representatives, existed from January 12, 2005 to January 9, 2007 during the first two years of Rod Blagojevich's second term as governor. The General Assembly met at the Illinois State Capitol.

During the 94th General Assembly, the Senate was in session for 119 legislative days, and the House was in session for 143 legislative days. There were no special sessions.

All 118 members of the House, and 23 of the 59 members of the Senate, were elected in the 2004 election. The apportionment of seats was based on the 2000 census. Both chambers had a Democratic majority.

The 94th General Assembly was followed by the 95th General Assembly in January 2007.

== Legislation ==
The 94th General Assembly enacted a total of 1,113 bills into law.

Early in the session, the General Assembly passed an amendment to the Illinois Human Rights Act to prohibit discrimination on the basis of sexual orientation. The governor signed the amendment into law on January 21, 2005.

Prompted by a series of high-profile dog bite incidents, in 2006 the legislature passed three measures imposing penalties on the owners of dangerous dogs or those involved in dog fighting. Among these was the first law in the country to prohibit certain felons, including those convicted of forcible felonies, from owning dogs that have not been spayed or neutered. The governor signed all three measures into law on May 31, 2006.

The Methamphetamine Precursor Control Act (720 ILCS 648) was signed into law on November 16, 2005, and took effect on January 15, 2006. The MPCA required that people present identification in order to purchase cold medication that contains pseudoephedrine (Sudafed, Tylenol Cold and Claritin D), which could be used to produce methamphetamine.

In 2006, the legislature passed an amendment to the Illinois Minimum Wage Law that allowed employees to receive punitive damages when they sue an employer for unpaid wages. This change was brought on by a 2005 Illinois Court of Appeals ruling that punitive damages were only available in cases brought by the state Department of Labor. The same bill also amended the Illinois Wage Payment and Collection Act to restore a penalty of 1% per day for employers who fail to pay wages due after receiving a demand from the Department of Labor. The bill was signed into law on July 14, 2006.

== Senate ==
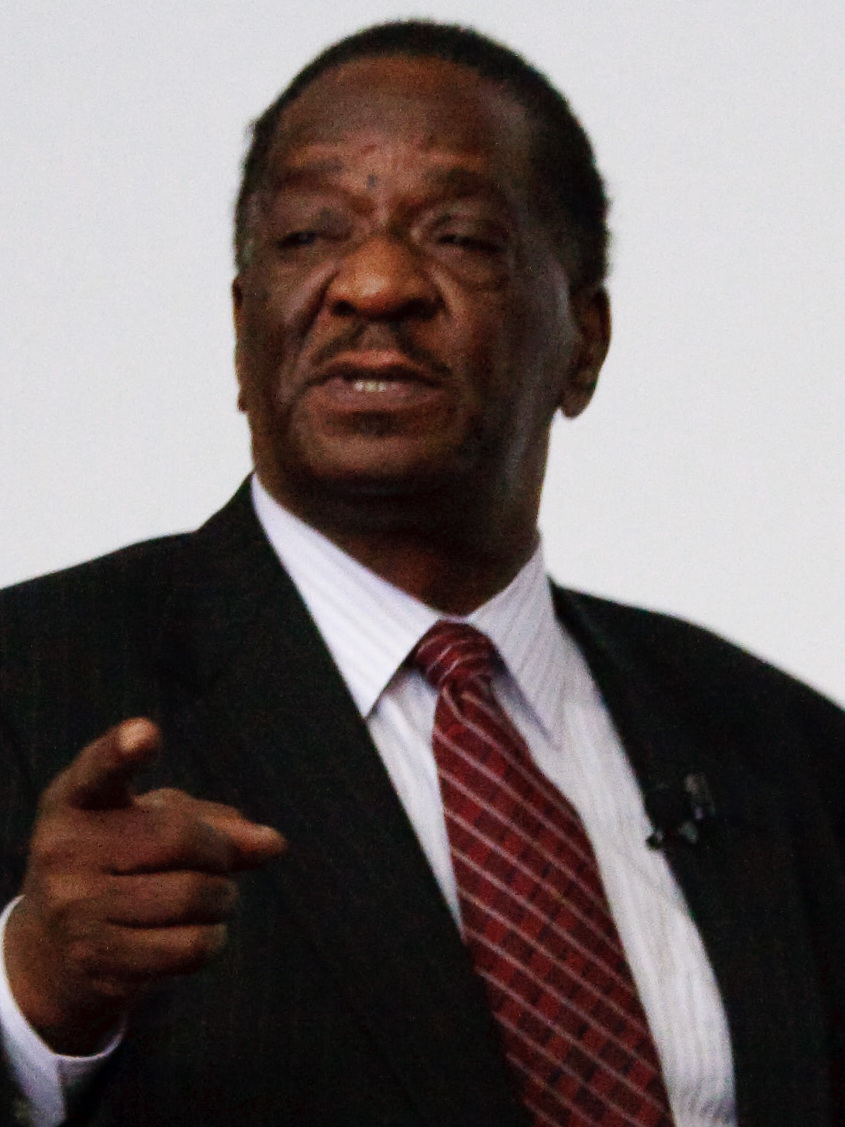
Emil Jones, president of the 94th Senate

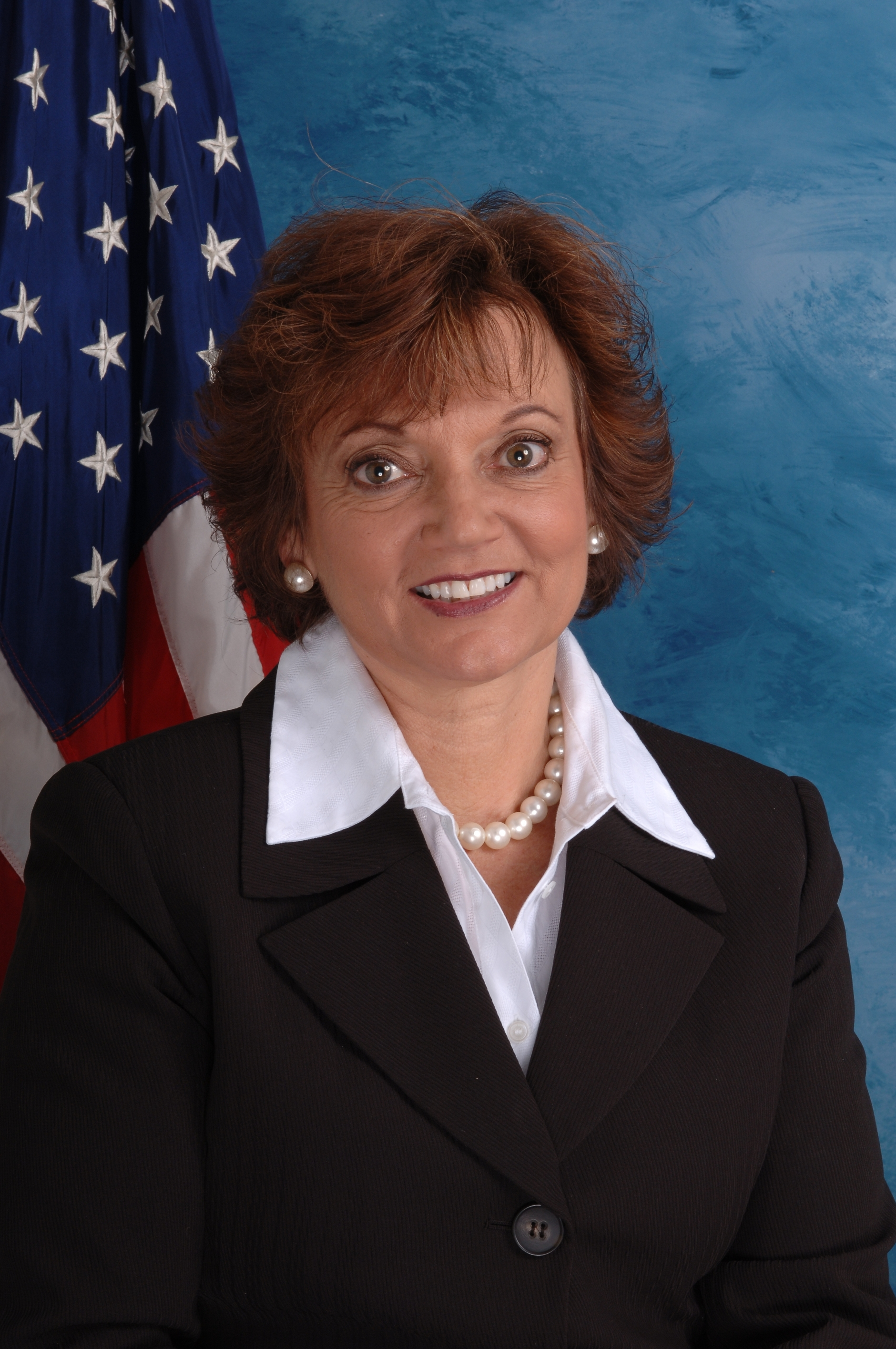
Majority Leader Debbie Halvorson

Minority Leader Frank Watson

Under the 1970 Illinois Constitution, the Illinois Senate has 59 members, who serve overlapping two- and four-year terms. Thirty votes are required for a majority, and 36 votes (or 60%) are required to override a veto or propose a constitutional amendment.

Of the 23 members elected in the 2004 election, 20 were elected to four-year terms, and three were elected to two-year terms.

Three new members joined the chamber at the outset: two by election and one (Kwame Raoul) by appointment to fill the seat of Barack Obama, who had been elected to the US Senate. Five members who had previously been appointed were elected in 2006 for the first time. The remaining 51 members were returning incumbents, either re-elected or continuing the second half of a four-year term.

=== Senate leadership ===
Position	Name	Party	District
President of the Senate	Emil Jones	Democratic	14
Majority Leader	Debbie Halvorson	Democratic	57
Minority Leader	Frank Watson	Republican	51

=== Party composition ===
The Senate of the 94th General Assembly consisted of 31 Democrats, 27 Republicans, and one Independent. One seat changed from Democratic to Republican hands in the 2004 Illinois Senate election, reducing the Democratic majority in the preceding 93rd Senate by one.

The independent Senator, James T. Meeks of Chicago, caucused with the Democrats. He had been elected in 2002 on the Honesty and Integrity Party ticket.

Affiliation	Members
Democratic Party	31
Republican Party	27
Independent	1
Total	59

=== State senators ===
District	Counties represented	Senator	Party	First year	Committees
1	Cook	Antonio Munoz	Democratic	1999	Chair: Transportation; Member: Appropriations III; Environment & Energy; Licensed Activities; Revenue; Senate Task Force on Illinois Alcoholic Beverage Laws
2	Cook	Miguel del Valle	Democratic	1987	Chair: Senate Education Funding Reform; Member: Education; Executive; Higher Education; Labor
2	Cook	William Delgado	Democratic	2006	
3	Cook	Mattie Hunter	Democratic	2003	Chair: Appropriations III; Member: Health & Human Services; Housing & Community Affairs; Pensions & Investments; State Government
4	Cook	Kimberly A. Lightford	Democratic	1998	Chair: Education; Member: Appropriations I; Financial Institutions; Higher Education; Labor
5	Cook	Rickey R. Hendon	Democratic	1993	Chair: Executive Appointments; Member: Environment & Energy; Executive; Housing & Community Affairs; Labor; Rules
6	Cook	John J. Cullerton	Democratic	1991	Chair: Judiciary; Member: Executive; Financial Institutions; Insurance; Rules
7	Cook	Carol Ronen	Democratic	1993	Chair: Health & Human Services; Member: Education; Higher Education; Labor
8	Cook	Ira I. Silverstein	Democratic	1999	Chair: Executive; Senate Task Force on Illinois Alcoholic Beverage Laws; Member: Commerce & Economic Development; Judiciary; Licensed Activities
9	Cook	Jeffrey M. Schoenberg	Democratic	2003	Chair: Appropriations II; Member: Appropriations I; Appropriations III; Financial Institutions; Health & Human Services
10	Cook	James A. DeLeo	Democratic	1993	Member: Executive; Executive Appointments; Local Government
11	Cook	Louis S. Viverito	Democratic	1995	Chair: Rules; Member: Appropriations II; Executive; Executive Appointments; Mobile Home Task Force
12	Cook	Martin A. Sandoval	Democratic	2003	Chair: Commerce & Economic Development; Member: Appropriations I; Environment & Energy; Local Government
13	Cook	Kwame Raoul	Democratic	2004	Member: Commerce & Economic Development; Health & Human Services; Higher Education; Judiciary; Pensions & Investments
14	Cook	Emil Jones Jr.	Democratic	1973	Member: Executive
15	Cook	James T. Meeks	Independent	2003	Chair: Housing & Community Affairs; Member: Appropriations I; Commerce & Economic Development; Education; Higher Education; Senate Education Funding Reform
16	Cook	Jacqueline Y. Collins	Democratic	2003	Chair: Financial Institutions; Member: Appropriations I; Housing & Community Affairs; Revenue
17	Cook	Donne E. Trotter	Democratic	1993	Chair: Appropriations I Member: Appropriations II; Appropriations III; Commerce & Economic Development; Environment & Energy; Revenue
18	Cook	Edward D. Maloney	Democratic	2003	Chair: Higher Education; Member: Appropriations I; Labor; Local Government
19	Cook, Will	M. Maggie Crotty	Democratic	2003	Chair: Local Government; Mobile Home Task Force; Member: Health & Human Services; Licensed Activities; State Government
20	Cook	Iris Y. Martinez	Democratic	2003	Chair: Pensions & Investments; Member: Health & Human Services; Housing & Community Affairs; Insurance
21	Cook, DuPage	Dan Cronin	Republican	1993	Chair: Senate Education Funding Reform; Member: Commerce & Economic Development; Education; Labor
22	Cook, Kane	Steven J. Rauschenberger	Republican	1992	Member: Appropriations I; Appropriations II; Appropriations III; Environment & Energy; Housing & Community Affairs
23	DuPage	Carole Pankau	Republican	2005	Member: Appropriations III; Health & Human Services; Labor; Revenue
24	DuPage, Will	Kirk W. Dillard	Republican	1993	Chair: Judiciary; Member: Environment & Energy; Executive Appointments; Licensed Activities
25	Kane, Kendall, La Salle	Chris Lauzen	Republican	1993	Member: Appropriations I; Appropriations II; Appropriations III; Revenue
26	Cook, Lake, McHenry	William E. Peterson	Republican	1983	Member: Insurance; Licensed Activities; State Government
27	Cook, Lake	Wendell E. Jones	Republican	1998	Member: Appropriations I; Housing & Community Affairs; Labor; Revenue
28	Cook, DuPage, Kane	Kathleen L. Wojcik	Republican	1983	
28	Cook, DuPage, Kane	John J. Millner	Republican	2005	Member: Licensed Activities; Pensions & Investments; State Government
29	Cook, Lake	Susan Garrett	Democratic	2003	Chair: State Government; Member: Appropriations III; Education; Health & Human Services; Transportation
30	Cook, Lake	Terry Link	Democratic	1997	Member: Appropriations II; Financial Institutions; Local Government; Revenue
31	Lake	Adeline Jay Geo-Karis	Republican	1973	Chair: Executive Appointments; Member: Pensions & Investments
32	McHenry	Pamela J. Althoff	Republican	2003	Member: Appropriations III; Commerce & Economic Development; Housing & Community Affairs; Local Government; State Government
33	Cook	Dave Sullivan	Republican	1998	
33	Cook	Cheryl Axley; Appointed September 17, 2005.	Republican	2005	Member: Financial Institutions; Local Government; Transportation
34	Winnebago	Dave Syverson	Republican	1993	Member: Appropriations I; Appropriations II; Commerce & Economic Development; Health & Human Services
35	Boone, De Kalb, Ogle, Winnebago	J. Bradley Burzynski	Republican	1993	Member: Appropriations II; Education; Executive; Higher Education; Senate Education Funding Reform
36	Carroll, Henry, Mercer, Rock Island, Whiteside	Denny Jacobs	Democratic	1986	
36	Carroll, Henry, Mercer, Rock Island, Whiteside	Mike Jacobs	Democratic	2005	Member: Environment & Energy; Executive Appointments; Insurance; Pensions & Investments; Revenue
37	Bureau, Henry, Knox, Marshall, Peoria, Stark, Woodford	Dale E. Risinger	Republican	2003	Member: Environment & Energy; Local Government; Transportation
38	Bureau, Grundy, Iroquois, Kankakee, La Salle, Putnam, Will	Gary G. Dahl	Republican	2005	Member: Agriculture & Conservation; Commerce & Economic Development; Local Government
39	Cook, DuPage	Don Harmon	Democratic	2003	Chair: Revenue; Member: Appropriations II; Environment & Energy; Judiciary; Pensions & Investments
40	Cook, Iroquois, Kankakee, Will	Debbie DeFrancesco Halvorson	Democratic	1997	Member: Agriculture & Conservation; Senate Task Force on Illinois Alcoholic Beverage Laws; Transportation
41	Cook, DuPage, Will	Christine Radogno	Republican	1997	Member: Appropriations I; Appropriations II; Appropriations III; Health & Human Services; Mobile Home Task Force; Transportation
42	Kane, Kendall, Will	Edward Petka; Resigned December 4, 2006.	Republican	1987	Member: Executive; Executive Appointments; Judiciary; Rules
42	Kane, Kendall, Will	Phyllis Petka; Sworn in December 4, 2006.	Republican	2006	Member: Executive Appointments; Insurance; Pensions & Investments
43	Will	Lawrence M. Walsh	Democratic	1997	
43	Will	Arthur J. Wilhelmi; Appointed January 17, 2005.	Democratic	2005	Member: Agriculture & Conservation; Appropriations II; Appropriations III; Housing & Community Affairs; Local Government
44	Christian, De Witt, Logan, Macon, McLean, Sangamon, Tazewell	Bill Brady	Republican	2002	Member: Insurance; Pensions & Investments; Revenue
45	Carroll, Henry, Jo Daviess, Lee, Ogle, Stephenson, Whiteside, Winnebago	Todd Sieben	Republican	1987	Member: Executive; Financial Institutions; Insurance; Senate Education Funding Reform
46	Fulton, Peoria, Tazewell	David Koehler	Democratic	2006	
46	Fulton, Peoria, Tazewell	George P. Shadid	Democratic	1993	Member: Executive; Executive Appointments; Insurance; Transportation
47	Adams, Brown, Cass, Fulton, Hancock, Henderson, Mason, McDonough, Mercer, Pike, Schuyler, Scott, Warren	John M. Sullivan	Democratic	2003	Chair: Agriculture & Conservation; Member: Appropriations II; Higher Education; Transportation
48	DuPage, Kane, Kendall	Peter J. Roskam	Republican	2000	Member: Environment & Energy; Executive; Insurance; Judiciary; Rules; Senate Task Force on Illinois Alcoholic Beverage Laws
48	DuPage, Kane, Kendall	Randy Hultgren	Republican	2007	
49	Calhoun, Christian, Fayette, Greene, Jersey, Macoupin, Madison, Montgomery, Morgan, Pike, Shelby	Deanna Demuzio	Democratic	2004	Chair: Joint Task Force -- Rural Healthcare; Licensed Activities; Member: Agriculture & Conservation; Commerce & Economic Development; Education; State Government
50	Logan, Menard, Sangamon	Larry K. Bomke	Republican	1995	Member: Financial Institutions; State Government; Transportation
51	Bond, Champaign, Clinton, De Witt, Effingham, Fayette, Macon, Madison, McLean, Piatt, Shelby, St. Clair	Frank C. Watson	Republican	1983	Member: Executive
52	Champaign, Vermilion	Richard J. Winkel Jr.	Republican	2003	Member: Agriculture & Conservation; Education; Higher Education; Judiciary
53	Champaign, Ford, Iroquois, Livingston, Marshall, McLean, Tazewell, Woodford	Dan Rutherford	Republican	2003	Member: Environment & Energy; Financial Institutions; Joint Task Force -- Rural Healthcare
54	Bond, Clay, Clinton, Edwards, Effingham, Hamilton, Jasper, Jefferson, Marion, Richland, Wayne, White	John O. Jones	Republican	2003	Member: Agriculture & Conservation; Housing & Community Affairs; Licensed Activities
55	Champaign, Clark, Coles, Crawford, Cumberland, Douglas, Edgar, Effingham, Lawrence, Piatt, Shelby, Wabash	Dale A. Righter	Republican	2003	Member: Health & Human Services; Higher Education; Joint Task Force -- Rural Healthcare; Labor; Pensions & Investments
56	Jersey, Madison, St. Clair	William R. Haine	Democratic	2002	Chair: Insurance; Member: Appropriations I; Environment & Energy; Judiciary; Licensed Activities; Senate Education Funding Reform
57	St. Clair	James F. Clayborne Jr.	Democratic	1995	Chair: Environment & Energy; Member: Appropriations II; Appropriations III; Insurance; Joint Task Force -- Rural Healthcare; Judiciary; Mobile Home Task Force; Pensions & Investments
58	Clinton, Jackson, Monroe, Perry, Randolph, St. Clair, Washington	David Luechtefeld	Republican	1995	Member: Agriculture & Conservation; Education; Executive Appointments; Higher Education; Senate Task Force on Illinois Alcoholic Beverage Laws
59	Alexander, Franklin, Gallatin, Hamilton, Hardin, Johnson, Massac, Pope, Pulaski, Saline, Union, White, Williamson	Gary Forby	Democratic	2003	Chair: Labor; Member: Agriculture & Conservation; Appropriations III; Education; State Government; Transportation

== House ==
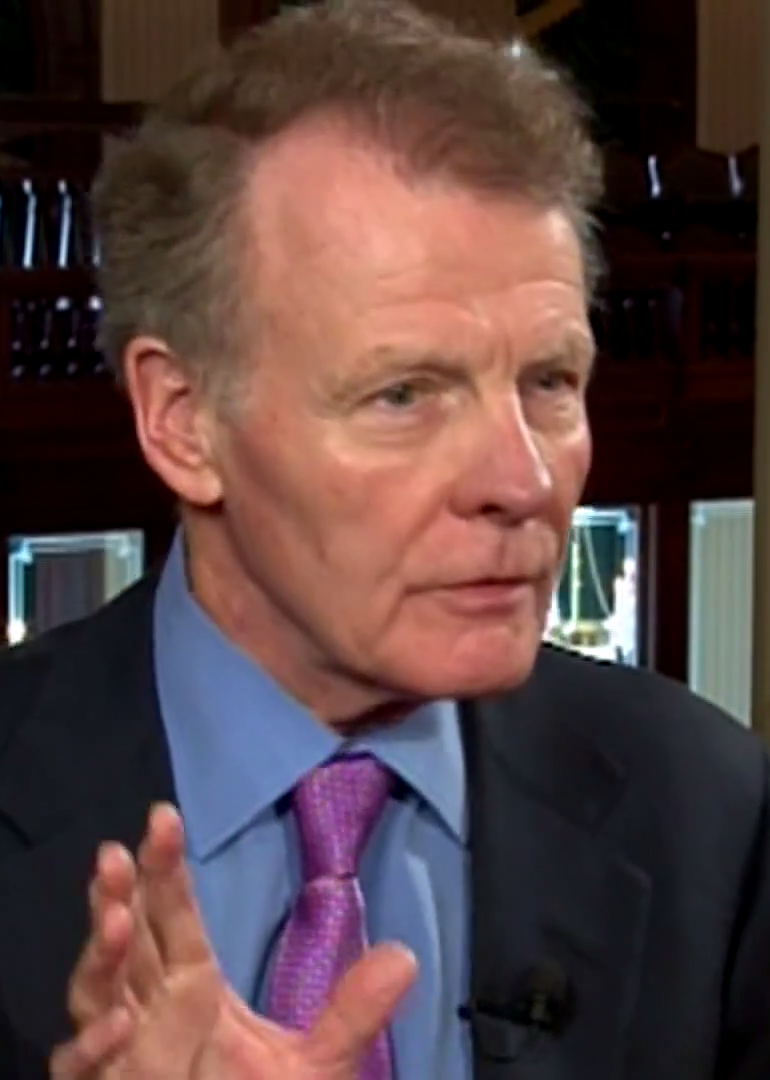
Michael Madigan, Speaker of the 94th House

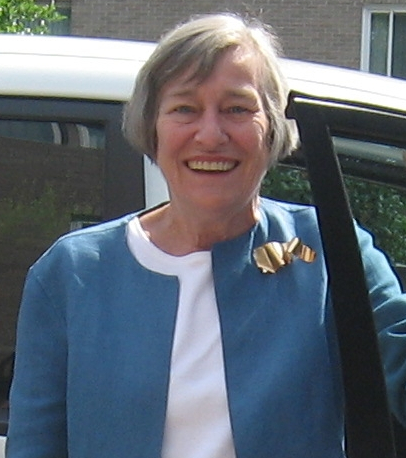
Majority Leader Barbara Flynn Currie

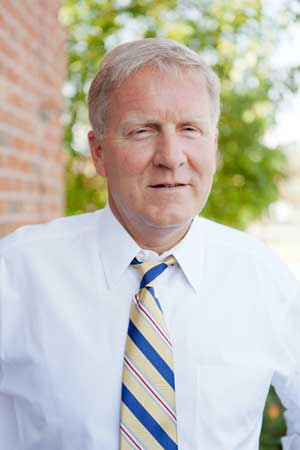
Minority Leader Tom Cross

The Illinois House has 118 members who are elected every two years. The composition of the 94th House reflects the results of the 2004 election, in which three seats changed from Democratic to Republican, and two seats changed from Republican to Democratic, resulting in a reduced 65–53 Democratic majority. Seven new members joined the chamber, and nine who had previously been appointed to fill vacancies were elected for the first time. 102 House incumbents were re-elected.

=== House leadership ===
Position	Name	Party	District
Speaker of the House	Michael J. Madigan	Democratic	22
Majority Leader	Barbara Flynn Currie	Democratic	25
Minority Leader	Tom Cross	Republican	84

=== Party composition ===
The 94th House consisted of 65 Democrats and 53 Republicans.

Affiliation	Members
Democratic Party	65
Republican Party	53
Total	118

=== State representatives ===
District	Counties represented	Representative	Party	First year	Committees
1	Cook	Susana A Mendoza	Democratic	2001	Chair: International Trade & Commerce; Member: Consumer Protection; Registration & Regulation; Transportation & Motor Vehicles
2	Cook	Edward J. Acevedo	Democratic	1997	Chair: Pension Fund Management Procurement; Member: Appropriations-Elementary & Secondary Education; Executive; Financial Institutions; International Trade & Commerce; Registration & Regulation; Telecommunications
3	Cook	William Delgado	Democratic	1999	Chair: Fee-For-Service Initiatives; Human Services; Member: Appropriations-Elementary & Secondary Education; Registration & Regulation
3	Cook	Luis Arroyo	Democratic	2007	Member: Judiciary II - Criminal Law
4	Cook	Cynthia Soto	Democratic	2001	Chair: Child Support Enforcement; Member: Appropriations-General Service; Appropriations-Higher Education; Labor; Mass Transit; Pension Fund Management Procurement; Transportation & Motor Vehicles
5	Cook	Kenneth Dunkin	Democratic	2002	Chair: Tourism & Conventions; Member: Appropriations-Public Safety; Child Support Enforcement; Financial Institutions; Insurance; Mass Transit; Telecommunications
6	Cook	Patricia Bailey	Democratic	2002	
6	Cook	Esther Golar	Democratic	2006	Member: Appropriations-General Service; Child Support Enforcement; Developmental Disabilities & Mental Illness; Health Care Availability Access; Judiciary II - Criminal Law; Tourism & Conventions; Veterans Affairs
7	Cook	Karen A. Yarbrough	Democratic	2001	Chair: Housing & Urban Development; Member: Appropriations-Public Safety; Computer Technology; Environmental Health; Insurance; Pension Fund Management Procurement
8	Cook	Calvin L. Giles	Democratic	1993	Chair: Elementary & Secondary Education; Member: Financial Institutions; Telecommunications; Tourism & Conventions
9	Cook	Arthur L. Turner	Democratic	1981	Member: Rules
10	Cook	Annazette Collins	Democratic	2001	Chair: Public Utilities; Member: Appropriations-Public Safety; Human Services; Judiciary II - Criminal Law; State Government Administration
11	Cook	John A. Fritchey	Democratic	1996	Chair: Judiciary I - Civil Law; Member: Financial Institutions; Registration & Regulation; Telecommunications; Transportation & Motor Vehicles
12	Cook	Sara Feigenholtz	Democratic	1995	Chair: Special Committee; Appropriations-Human Services; Fee-For-Service Initiatives; Member: Adoption Reform; Environmental Health; Insurance; Tourism & Conventions
13	Cook	Larry McKeon	Democratic	1997	Chair: Labor; Member: Aging; Executive; Housing & Urban Development
13	Cook	Greg Harris	Democratic	2006	
14	Cook	Harry Osterman	Democratic	2000	Chair: Local Government; Member: Appropriations-Human Services; Elementary & Secondary Education; Financial Institutions; Mass Transit
15	Cook	John D'Amico	Democratic	2004	Member: Aging; Appropriations-Public Safety; Elections & Campaign Reform; Electric Utility Oversight; Labor; Transportation & Motor Vehicles
16	Cook	Lou Lang	Democratic	1987	Chair: Gaming; Member: Special Committee on Adoption Reform; Insurance; Judiciary I - Civil Law
17	Cook	Elizabeth Coulson	Republican	1997	Member: Aging; Appropriations-Elementary & Secondary Education; Appropriations-Human Services; Fee-For-Service Initiatives; Financial Institutions; Human Services; Registration & Regulation
18	Cook	Julie Hamos	Democratic	1999	Chair: Mass Transit; Member: Environment & Energy; Fee-For-Service Initiatives; Housing & Urban Development; Judiciary I - Civil Law; Telecommunications
19	Cook	Joseph M. Lyons	Democratic	1996	Member: Aging; Executive; Financial Institutions; Telecommunications; Transportation & Motor Vehicles
20	Cook	Michael P. McAuliffe	Republican	1997	Chair: Veterans Affairs; Member: Appropriations-Public Safety; Fee-For-Service Initiatives; Financial Institutions; Registration & Regulation; Telecommunications; Transportation & Motor Vehicles
21	Cook	Robert S. Molaro	Democratic	2003	Chair: Judiciary II - Criminal Law; Member: Appropriations-Public Safety; Executive; Gaming; Mass Transit; Transportation & Motor Vehicles
22	Cook	Michael J. Madigan	Democratic	1971	Member: Electric Utility Oversight; Executive
23	Cook	Daniel J. Burke	Democratic	1991	Chair: Executive; Member: Financial Institutions; Pension Fund Management Procurement; Personnel & Pensions; Registration & Regulation
24	Cook	Michelle Chavez	Democratic		Member: Appropriations-Elementary & Secondary Education; Health Care Availability Access; Higher Education; Human Services; Mass Transit; State Government Administration
25	Cook	Barbara Flynn Currie	Democratic	1979	Chair: Fee-For-Service Initiatives; Rules; Member: Revenue
26	Cook	Lovana Jones	Democratic	1987	Chair: Appropriations-Public Safety; Member: Executive; Financial Institutions; Judiciary II-Criminal Law; Public Utilities
26	Cook	Elga L. Jefferies	Democratic	2006	Member: Appropriations-Public Safety; Judiciary II - Criminal Law; Public Utilities
27	Cook	Monique D. Davis	Democratic	1987	Chair: Appropriations-General Service; Member: Appropriations-Higher Education; Elementary & Secondary Education; Financial Institutions; Public Utilities; Registration & Regulation
28	Cook	Robert Rita	Democratic	2003	Member: Consumer Protection; Environment & Energy; Gaming; Human Services; Insurance
29	Cook	David E. Miller	Democratic	2001	Chair: Appropriations-Higher Education; Pension Fund Management Procurement; Member: Elementary & Secondary Education; Higher Education; Mass Transit; Registration & Regulation; Transportation & Motor Vehicles
30	Cook	William Davis	Democratic	2003	Member: Appropriations-Elementary & Secondary Education; Appropriations-Higher Education; Child Support Enforcement; International Trade & Commerce; Labor
31	Cook	Mary E. Flowers	Democratic	1985	Chair: Health Care Availability Access; Member: Appropriations-Elementary & Secondary Education; Fee-For-Service Initiatives; Human Services; International Trade & Commerce
32	Cook	Milton Patterson	Democratic	2005	Member: Appropriations-Public Safety; Computer Technology; Electric Utility Oversight; Housing & Urban Development
33	Cook	Marlow H. Colvin	Democratic	2001	Chair: Consumer Protection; Member: Appropriations-Public Safety; Elementary & Secondary Education; Insurance; Labor; Pension Fund Management Procurement; Personnel & Pensions; Telecommunications
34	Cook	Constance A. Howard	Democratic	1995	Chair: Computer Technology; Member: Appropriations-Elementary & Secondary Education; Health Care Availability Access; Higher Education; Human Services; Judiciary II - Criminal Law; Labor
35	Cook	Kevin Joyce	Democratic	2003	Chair: Aging; Member: Appropriations-Higher Education; Elementary & Secondary Education; Environment & Energy; Registration & Regulation; Transportation & Motor Vehicles
36	Cook	James D. Brosnahan	Democratic	1997	Chair: Telecommunications; Member: Fee-For-Service Initiatives; Higher Education; Judiciary I - Civil Law; Transportation & Motor Vehicles
37	Cook, Will	Kevin A. McCarthy	Democratic	1997	Chair: Higher Education; Member: Environmental Health; Financial Institutions; Telecommunications; Transportation & Motor Vehicles
38	Cook	Robin Kelly	Democratic	2002	Member: Appropriations-Human Services; Housing & Urban Development; International Trade & Commerce; Local Government; Mass Transit
39	Cook	Maria Antonia Berrios	Democratic	2003	Member: Executive; Gaming; Insurance; International Trade & Commerce
40	Cook	Richard T. Bradley	Democratic	1997	Chair: Personnel & Pensions; Member: Environment & Energy; Executive; Financial Institutions; Insurance; Registration & Regulation; Telecommunications
41	DuPage	Bob Biggins	Republican	1993	Member: Appropriations-General Service; Executive; Fee-For-Service Initiatives; Housing & Urban Development; Labor; Public Utilities; Revenue
42	Cook, DuPage	Sandra M. Pihos	Republican	2003	Member: Appropriations-Elementary & Secondary Education; Elementary & Secondary Education; Housing & Urban Development; Mass Transit; Telecommunications; Tourism & Conventions
43	Cook, Kane	Ruth Munson	Republican	2002	Member: Appropriations-Human Services; Computer Technology; Elementary & Secondary Education; Financial Institutions; Insurance; Pension Fund Management Procurement; Registration & Regulation
44	Cook	Terry R. Parke	Republican	1985	Member: Consumer Protection; Environment & Energy; Environmental Health; Insurance; Labor; Pension Fund Management Procurement; Telecommunications
45	DuPage	Roger Jenisch	Republican	2005	Member: Financial Institutions; Human Services; Insurance; Mass Transit; Revenue; Tourism & Conventions
46	DuPage	Lee A. Daniels	Republican	1975	Chair: Developmental Disabilities & Mental Illness; Fee-For-Service Initiatives
46	DuPage	Dennis M. Reboletti	Republican	2007	
47	DuPage	Patricia R. Bellock	Republican	1999	Member: Aging; Developmental Disabilities & Mental Illness; Financial Institutions; Human Services; International Trade & Commerce; Registration & Regulation
48	DuPage, Will	James H. Meyer	Republican	1993	Member: Environment & Energy; Environmental Health; Executive; Fee-For-Service Initiatives; Telecommunications; Veterans Affairs
49	Kane	Timothy L. Schmitz	Republican	1999	Member: Appropriations-Public Safety; Child Support Enforcement; Housing & Urban Development; Labor; Telecommunications
50	Kane, Kendall, La Salle	Patricia Reid Lindner	Republican	1993	Member: Special Committee on Adoption Reform; Appropriations-Elementary & Secondary Education; Child Support Enforcement; Judiciary II - Criminal Law
51	Lake	Ed Sullivan Jr.	Republican	2003	Member: Appropriations-Elementary & Secondary Education; Electric Utility Oversight; Gaming; Mass Transit; Registration & Regulation; Revenue
52	Cook, Lake, McHenry	Mark H. Beaubien Jr.	Republican	1996	Member: Electric Utility Oversight; Gaming; Labor; Pension Fund Management Procurement; Revenue
53	Cook, Lake	Sidney H. Mathias	Republican	1999	Member: Special Committee on Adoption Reform; Health Care Availability Access; Judiciary I - Civil Law; Local Government; Mass Transit; Transportation & Motor Vehicles
54	Cook	Suzanne Bassi	Republican	1999	Member: Appropriations-Elementary & Secondary Education; Elementary & Secondary Education; Housing & Urban Development; Mass Transit; Tourism & Conventions
55	Cook, DuPage, Kane	John J. Millner	Republican	2005	Member: State Government; Licensed Activities; Pensions and Investments; Legislative Printing Unit
55	Cook, DuPage, Kane	Harry R. Ramey Jr.	Republican	2005	Member: Appropriations-Public Safety; Computer Technology; Consumer Protection; State Government Administration; Transportation & Motor Vehicles
56	Cook, DuPage	Paul D. Froehlich	Republican	2003	Member: Aging; Electric Utility Oversight; Housing & Urban Development; Judiciary II - Criminal Law; Registration & Regulation; Transportation & Motor Vehicles
57	Cook	Elaine Nekritz	Democratic	2003	Member: Appropriations-Higher Education; Environment & Energy; Housing & Urban Development; Judiciary I - Civil Law; Transportation & Motor Vehicles
58	Lake	Karen May	Democratic	2001	Chair: Environmental Health; Member: Environment & Energy; Health Care Availability Access; Mass Transit; Telecommunications
59	Cook, Lake	Kathleen A. Ryg	Democratic	2003	Member: Appropriations-Elementary & Secondary Education; Developmental Disabilities & Mental Illness; Environmental Health; Fee-For-Service Initiatives; Housing & Urban Development; Local Government; Mass Transit
60	Lake	Eddie Washington	Democratic	2003	Member: Appropriations-Human Services; Appropriations-Public Safety; Consumer Protection; Labor; Mass Transit; Transportation & Motor Vehicles
61	Lake	JoAnn D. Osmond	Republican	2003	Member: Appropriations-Public Safety; Health Care Availability Access; Insurance; Judiciary I - Civil Law; Telecommunications
62	Lake	Robert W. Churchill	Republican	1983	Member: Developmental Disabilities & Mental Illness; Environmental Health; Mass Transit
63	McHenry	Jack D. Franks	Democratic	1999	Chair: State Government Administration; Member: Aging; Electric Utility Oversight; International Trade & Commerce
64	McHenry	Michael Tryon	Republican	2005	Member: Consumer Protection; Environment & Energy; Environmental Health; Local Government; Mass Transit; Transportation & Motor Vehicles
65	Cook	Rosemary Mulligan	Republican	1993	Member: Appropriations-Human Services; Elementary & Secondary Education; Fee-For-Service Initiatives; Health Care Availability Access; Registration & Regulation
66	Cook	Carolyn H. Krause	Republican	1993	Member: Electric Utility Oversight; Fee-For-Service Initiatives; Health Care Availability Access; International Trade & Commerce; Revenue
67	Winnebago	Charles E. Jefferson	Democratic	2001	Chair: Elections & Campaign Reform; Member: Aging; Labor; Public Utilities
68	Winnebago	Dave Winters	Republican	1995	Member: Child Support Enforcement; Environment & Energy; Labor; Pension Fund Management Procurement; Telecommunications
69	Boone, De Kalb, Winnebago	Ronald A. Wait	Republican	1983	Member: Aging; Appropriations-Public Safety; Elections & Campaign Reform; Judiciary I - Civil Law; Judiciary II - Criminal Law; Transportation & Motor Vehicles
70	De Kalb, Ogle	Robert W. Pritchard	Republican	2003	Member: Agriculture & Conservation; Appropriations-Higher Education; Computer Technology; Elementary & Secondary Education; Higher Education; Registration & Regulation
71	Carroll, Henry, Rock Island, Whiteside	Mike Boland	Democratic	1995	Chair: Financial Institutions; Member: Agriculture & Conservation; Appropriations-Public Safety; Labor; Telecommunications
72	Mercer, Rock Island	Patrick J Verschoore	Democratic	2003	Member: Agriculture & Conservation; Appropriations-Human Services; Electric Utility Oversight; Environment & Energy; Gaming; Veterans Affairs
73	Bureau, Marshall, Peoria, Woodford	David R. Leitch	Republican	1986	Member: Appropriations-Human Services; Environment & Energy; Fee-For-Service Initiatives; Housing & Urban Development; Public Utilities
74	Bureau, Henry, Knox, Stark	Donald L. Moffitt	Republican	1993	Member: Agriculture & Conservation; Appropriations-Public Safety; Elementary & Secondary Education; Local Government; Veterans Affairs
75	Grundy, Iroquois, Kankakee, La Salle, Will	Careen M Gordon	Democratic	2003	Member: Aging; Appropriations-Elementary & Secondary Education; Consumer Protection; Judiciary I - Civil Law; Judiciary II - Criminal Law
76	Bureau, La Salle, Putnam	Frank J. Mautino	Democratic	1991	Chair: Insurance; Member: Environment & Energy; Financial Institutions; Judiciary II - Criminal Law; Registration & Regulation
77	Cook, DuPage	Angelo Saviano	Republican	1993	Chair: Registration & Regulation; Member: Aging; Appropriations-Public Safety; Executive; Public Utilities
78	Cook	Deborah L. Graham	Democratic	2003	Member: Appropriations-General Service; Appropriations-Human Services; Housing & Urban Development; Labor; Transportation & Motor Vehicles
79	Iroquois, Kankakee, Will	Lisa M. Dugan	Democratic	2003	Member: Agriculture & Conservation; Elementary & Secondary Education; Health Care Availability Access; International Trade & Commerce; State Government Administration; Veterans Affairs
80	Cook, Will	George Scully Jr.	Democratic	1997	Chair: Electric Utility Oversight; Member: Appropriations-Higher Education; Consumer Protection; Gaming
81	Cook, DuPage, Will	Renee Kosel	Republican	1997	Member: Appropriations-Elementary & Secondary Education; Environment & Energy; Executive; Gaming; Registration & Regulation
82	Will	Eileen Lyons; Resigned January 5, 2006.	Republican	1995	
82	Will	Jim Durkin; Sworn in January 6, 2006.	Republican	1995	Member: Appropriations-Elementary & Secondary Education; Elections & Campaign Reform; Fee-For-Service Initiatives; International Trade & Commerce; Judiciary II - Criminal Law
83	Kane	Linda Chapa LaVia	Democratic	2003	Member: Special Committee on Adoption Reform; Consumer Protection; Developmental Disabilities & Mental Illness; Elementary & Secondary Education; International Trade & Commerce; Veterans Affairs
84	Kendall, Will	Tom Cross	Republican	1993	
85	Will	Brent Hassert	Republican	1993	Member: Executive; Gaming; Mass Transit; Public Utilities; Rules
86	Will	Jack McGuire	Democratic	1991	Member: Aging; Agriculture & Conservation; Revenue; Tourism & Conventions
87	Christian, De Witt, Logan, Macon, McLean, Sangamon, Tazewell	Bill Mitchell	Republican	1999	Member: Aging; Electric Utility Oversight; Financial Institutions; Insurance; State Government Administration
88	McLean	Dan Brady	Republican	2001	Member: Appropriations-Higher Education; Child Support Enforcement; Consumer Protection; Higher Education; Insurance
89	Carroll, Jo Daviess, Ogle, Winnebago, Stephenson	Jim Sacia	Republican	2003	Member: Agriculture & Conservation; International Trade & Commerce; Judiciary I - Civil Law; Judiciary II - Criminal Law; Veterans Affairs
90	Henry, Lee, Ogle, Whiteside	Jerry L. Mitchell	Republican	1995	Member: Aging; Appropriations-Elementary & Secondary Education; Elementary & Secondary Education; Tourism & Conventions
91	Fulton, Peoria, Tazewell	Michael K. Smith	Democratic	1995	Chair: Appropriations-Elementary & Secondary Education; Member: Elementary & Secondary Education; Environment & Energy; Financial Institutions; Revenue
92	Peoria	Aaron Schock	Republican	2005	Member: Appropriations-Elementary & Secondary Education; Appropriations-Human Services; Environment & Energy; Financial Institutions; Pension Fund Management Procurement; Veterans Affairs
93	Adams, Brown, Cass, Hancock, Pike, Schuyler, Scott	Art Tenhouse	Republican	1989	Member: Environment and Energy; Consumer Protection; Electric Utility Oversight; Labor; Transportation and Motor Vehicles
93	Adams, Brown, Cass, Hancock, Pike, Schuyler, Scott	Jil Tracy	Republican	2006	Member: Aging; Consumer Protection; Environment & Energy; Transportation & Motor Vehicles
94	Fulton, Hancock, Henderson, Mason, McDonough, Mercer, Warren	Richard P. Myers	Republican	1995	Member: Agriculture & Conservation; Appropriations-Higher Education; Elections & Campaign Reform; Electric Utility Oversight; International Trade & Commerce; State Government Administration
95	DuPage, Kane	Randall M. Hultgren	Republican	1999	Member: Developmental Disabilities & Mental Illness; Financial Institutions; International Trade & Commerce; Judiciary I - Civil Law; Labor; Telecommunications
95	DuPage, Kane	Mike Fortner	Republican	2007	
96	DuPage, Kendall	Joe Dunn	Republican	2003	Member: Financial Institutions; Human Services; Insurance; Labor; Mass Transit; Telecommunications
97	Calhoun, Greene, Jersey, Macoupin, Morgan, Pike	Jim Watson	Republican	2001	Member: Aging; Appropriations-General Service; Elementary & Secondary Education; Financial Institutions; Local Government; Public Utilities
98	Christian, Fayette, Macoupin, Madison, Montgomery, Shelby	Gary Hannig	Democratic	1979	Chair: Appropriations-Public Safety; Member: Computer Technology; Revenue; Rules
99	Sangamon	Raymond Poe	Republican	1995	Member: Appropriations-Higher Education; Higher Education; Housing & Urban Development; Personnel & Pensions; Transportation & Motor Vehicles
100	Logan, Menard, Sangamon	Rich Brauer	Republican	2003	Member: Appropriations-General Service; Appropriations-Higher Education; Environmental Health; Financial Institutions; Personnel & Pensions; Registration & Regulation; Transportation & Motor Vehicles
101	Champaign, De Witt, Macon, McLean, Piatt	Robert F. Flider	Democratic	2003	Member: Agriculture & Conservation; Elections & Campaign Reform; Elementary & Secondary Education; Local Government; Veterans Affairs
102	Bond, Clinton, Effingham, Fayette, Madison, Shelby, St. Clair	Ron Stephens	Republican	1985	Member: Appropriations-Public Safety; Electric Utility Oversight; Gaming; State Government Administration; Transportation & Motor Vehicles
103	Champaign	Naomi D. Jakobsson	Democratic	2003	Member: Special Committee on Adoption Reform; Appropriations-Elementary & Secondary Education; Appropriations-Higher Education; Higher Education; Human Services
104	Champaign, Vermilion	William B. Black	Republican	1986	Member: Higher Education; Rules; Telecommunications; Transportation & Motor Vehicles
105	Champaign, Ford, Iroquois, Livingston, McLean	Shane Cultra	Republican	2003	Member: Agriculture & Conservation; Environment & Energy; Financial Institutions; Human Services; Judiciary II - Criminal Law; Labor
106	Livingston, Marshall, McLean, Tazewell, Woodford	Keith P. Sommer	Republican	1999	Member: Special Committee on Adoption Reform; Agriculture & Conservation; Health Care Availability Access; International Trade & Commerce; Local Government; Veterans Affairs
107	Bond, Clinton, Jefferson, Marion	Kurt M. Granberg	Democratic	1987	Chair: Agriculture & Conservation; Member: Electric Utility Oversight; Registration & Regulation
108	Clay, Edwards, Effingham, Hamilton, Jasper, Richland, Wayne, White	David Reis	Republican	2005	Member: Agriculture & Conservation; Elementary & Secondary Education; Financial Institutions; International Trade & Commerce; Judiciary II - Criminal Law; Registration & Regulation
109	Clark, Crawford, Cumberland, Edgar, Effingham, Lawrence, Shelby, Wabash	Roger L. Eddy	Republican	2003	Member: Appropriations-Elementary & Secondary Education; Appropriations-Higher Education; Elementary & Secondary Education; Higher Education; Labor
110	Champaign, Coles, Douglas, Piatt	Chapin Rose	Republican	2003	Member: Appropriations-Higher Education; Environment & Energy; Financial Institutions; Insurance; Judiciary I - Civil Law
111	Jersey, Madison	Daniel V. Beiser	Democratic	2004	Member: Aging; Appropriations-Higher Education; Elections & Campaign Reform; Elementary & Secondary Education; Higher Education; Local Government; Transportation & Motor Vehicles
112	Madison, St. Clair	Jay C. Hoffman	Democratic	1991	Chair: Transportation & Motor Vehicles; Member: Judiciary I - Civil Law; Labor
113	St. Clair	Thomas Holbrook	Democratic	1995	Chair: Environment & Energy; Member: Financial Institutions; Public Utilities; Registration & Regulation; Revenue
114	St. Clair	Wyvetter H. Younge	Democratic	1975	Member: Appropriations-Elementary & Secondary Education; Child Support Enforcement; Environmental Health; Housing & Urban Development; Local Government; Revenue
115	Clinton, Jackson, Perry, Washington	Mike Bost	Republican	1995	Member: Consumer Protection; Higher Education; Telecommunications; Transportation & Motor Vehicles; Veterans Affairs
116	Monroe, Perry, Randolph, St. Clair	Dan Reitz	Democratic	1997	Chair: Revenue; Member: Aging; Agriculture & Conservation; Environment & Energy; Financial Institutions; Registration & Regulation
117	Franklin, Hamilton, Williamson	John E. Bradley	Democratic	2003	Member: Aging; Appropriations-Elementary & Secondary Education; International Trade & Commerce; Judiciary I - Civil Law; Judiciary II - Criminal Law; State Government Administration
118	Alexander, Gallatin, Hamilton, Hardin, Johnson, Massac, Pope, Pulaski, Saline, Union, White	Brandon W. Phelps	Democratic	2003	Member: Agriculture & Conservation; Electric Utility Oversight; Environment & Energy; Registration & Regulation; Veterans Affairs

== See also ==
- 109th United States Congress
- List of Illinois state legislatures

== Works cited ==
- Illinois Blue Book, 2005-2006. Illinois Secretary of State. 2005.
  - Legislative Districts of Illinois
  - Legislators' Portraits and Biographies
