= Kevin Joyce =

Kevin Joyce may refer to:

- Kevin Joyce (politician), Democratic member of the Illinois House of Representatives
- Kevin Joyce (basketball) (born 1951), retired American basketball player
