= Senator Crotty =

Senator Crotty may refer to:

- Maggie Crotty (1948–2020), Illinois State Senate
- Rich Crotty (born 1948), Florida State Senate
