= John Novak =

John Novak may refer to:

- John Novak (actor), Canadian voice, film and television actor
- John Novak (rugby union) (born 1947), English academic and rugby union player
- John Philip Novak (born 1946), American politician and businessman
