= Franco Coladipietro =

American politician

Village President of Bloomingdale
- Incumbent
- Assumed office May 2013
- Preceded by: Bob Iden

Member of the Illinois House of Representatives from the 45th district
- In office January 2007 – January 2013
- Preceded by: Roger Jenisch
- Succeeded by: Dennis Reboletti

Personal details
- Born: June 13, 1968 (age 58)
- Party: Republican
- Spouse: Amy Coladipietro
- Education: John Marshall Law School; Northern Illinois University
- Profession: Attorney

Franco Coladipietro is currently the Village President in Bloomingdale, Illinois and previously served as a Republican member of the Illinois House of Representatives representing Illinois' 45th House District. In 2006 Coladipietro unseated Republican incumbent Roger Jenisch in the Republican Primary, and went on to defeat Democrat Rob Bisceglie in the general election. He was elected to three terms in the Illinois House of Representatives and served as the minority spokesman for the Financial Institutions Committee and as a member of the Legislative Ethics Commission. Coladipietro chose not to run for re-election in 2012, and instead successfully ran for Bloomingdale Village President in 2013, unseating 20-year incumbent Robert Iden.

Coladipietro is a partner with the law firm of Amari & Locallo. He practices exclusively in the area of property tax assessment matters on a nationwide basis. His representative client base includes national REITs, property management firms and commercial and industrial property owners. Coladipietro holds a Juris Doctor from John Marshall Law School and served as a Staff Editor for The John Marshall Law Review.

Professional Awards/Recognition

"2018 Governmental Leader of the Year", DuPage Mayors and Managers Conference; "Today’s Young Executive Award, The Business Ledger, 2005 "Top Forty Lawyers under Forty", Law Bulletin Publishing Company, 2003 Young Lawyer of the Year, Illinois State Bar Association, 2004 Rookie of the Year, Bloomingdale Chamber of Commerce, 2004 Alumni Distinguished Service Award, The John Marshall Law School, 2004 Guest Appearance, CNNfn "Your Money", Real Estate Taxation, 2004 Board of Governors Award, Illinois State Bar Association, 2003 Community Service Award, Illinois State Bar Association, 2000

== Electoral history ==
- 2006 45th Legislative District Republican Primary
  - Franco Coladipietro 53.2%
  - Roger Jenisch 46.8%
- 2006 45th Legislative District General Election
  - Franco Coladipietro (R) 57.1%
  - Rob Bisceglie (D) 42.8%
- 2013 Consolidated Election-Village President
  - Franco Coladipietro (I) 52.92%
  - Robert Iden 47.08%
