= John O'Sullivan (Illinois politician) =

American politician

Member of the Illinois House of Representatives from the 35th district
- In office August 27, 2010 – January 11, 2011
- Preceded by: Kevin Joyce
- Succeeded by: Bill Cunningham

Personal details
- Party: Democratic
- Spouse: Tricia
- Children: Three

John O'Sullivan was a Democratic member of the Illinois House of Representatives for a brief period between August 2010 to January 2011. He served on the Vehicle Safety committee. He is the Democratic Committeeman for Worth Township. He has been the Committeeman since 2010, when he ousted incumbent Dennis Magee. He is a member of Laborers' International Union of North America Chicago Local 2.

As of 2019, O'Sullivan was the Worth Township Supervisor. O’Sullivan resigned in 2021 after pleading guilty to a bribery scheme.
