= 2004 Illinois elections =

- November 2, 2004
- Turnout: 71.34%

The Illinois general election was held in the U.S. state of Illinois on November 2, 2004.

Primaries were held March 16, 2004.

== Election information ==
=== Turnout ===
==== Primary election ====
For the primary election, turnout was 28.97%, with 2,067,824 votes cast.

Turnout by county

County	Registration	Votes cast	Turnout
Adams	41,008	16,705	40.74%
Alexander	7,069	2,121	30%
Bond	10,738	2,237	20.83%
Boone	27,587	10,301	37.34%
Brown	3,536	676	19.12%
Bureau	24,315	6,540	26.9%
Calhoun	3,720	863	23.2%
Carroll	12,248	2,714	22.16%
Cass	9,069	2,691	29.67%
Champaign	105,399	26,192	24.85%
Christian	22,608	6,600	29.19%
Clark	11,911	2,131	17.89%
Clay	9,913	2,834	28.59%
Clinton	26,184	2,756	10.53%
Coles	39,029	5,327	13.65%
Cook (Note: For more on Cook County primary election turnout, see 2004 Cook County, Illinois elections#Primary election)	2,630,541	921,086	35.02%
Crawford	13,975	2,193	15.69%
Cumberland	8,354	1,945	23.28%
DeKalb	47,828	15,139	31.65%
DeWitt	12,490	5,667	45.37%
Douglas	12,084	3,202	26.5%
DuPage	597,153	154,173	25.82%
Edgar	12,742	2,609	20.48%
Edwards	5,312	1,480	27.86%
Effingham	21,256	6,345	29.85%
Fayette	14,076	3,253	23.11%
Ford	9,036	1,851	20.48%
Franklin	31,964	9,105	28.49%
Fulton	25,869	9,168	35.44%
Gallatin	4,524	2,340	51.72%
Greene	8,955	2,704	30.2%
Grundy	26,747	7,797	29.15%
Hamilton	6,474	2,631	40.64%
Hancock	13,645	3,262	23.91%
Hardin	3,839	1,468	38.24%
Henderson	5,191	952	18.34%
Henry	37,042	6,285	16.97%
Iroquois	19,830	4,232	21.34%
Jackson	39,023	9,602	24.61%
Jasper	7,214	1,575	21.83%
Jefferson	25,838	4,497	17.4%
Jersey	14,807	2,616	17.67%
Jo Daviess	16,058	6,514	40.57%
Johnson	7,138	3,019	42.29%
Kane	227,101	59,328	26.12%
Kankakee	60,650	11,769	19.4%
Kendall	43,552	10,605	24.35%
Knox	37,487	8,676	23.14%
Lake	348,513	97,800	28.06%
LaSalle	71,390	15,279	21.4%
Lawrence	11,195	1,743	15.57%
Lee	21,527	5,164	23.99%
Livingston	22,647	9,469	41.81%
Logan	19,915	6,160	30.93%
Macon	75,944	17,604	23.18%
Macoupin	34,414	10,816	31.43%
Madison	174,769	31,863	18.23%
Marion	30,278	6,262	20.68%
Marshall	8,915	2,063	23.14%
Mason	11,017	3,166	28.74%
Massac	11,741	2,976	25.35%
McDonough	17,446	5,915	33.9%
McHenry	172,648	52,868	30.62%
McLean	84,996	26,640	31.34%
Menard	9,107	3,783	41.54%
Mercer	13,614	3,688	27.09%
Monroe	21,249	2,671	12.57%
Montgomery	18,263	5,007	27.42%
Morgan	22,810	6,357	27.87%
Moultrie	9,744	2,217	22.75%
Ogle	34,350	9,456	27.53%
Peoria	119,178	28,042	23.53%
Perry	15,503	4,124	26.6%
Piatt	11,345	2,889	25.46%
Pike	12,150	2,624	21.6%
Pope	3,741	1,288	34.43%
Pulaski	6,268	1,452	23.17%
Putnam	4,446	2,395	53.87%
Randolph	24,944	5,914	23.71%
Richland	12,626	3,106	24.6%
Rock Island	99,194	20,505	20.67%
Saline	17,786	7,054	39.66%
Sangamon	126,966	27,873	21.95%
Schuyler	5,366	1,028	19.16%
Scott	3,912	1,178	30.11%
Shelby	16,838	4,029	23.93%
Stark	4,782	829	17.34%
St. Clair	179,664	37,952	21.12%
Stephenson	31,430	9,459	30.1%
Tazewell	89,150	19,515	21.89%
Union	15,828	5,743	36.28%
Vermilion	49,300	8,467	17.17%
Wabash	10,200	2,287	22.42%
Warren	13,112	3,600	27.46%
Washington	10,794	2,956	27.39%
Wayne	12,657	3,033	23.96%
White	11,710	2,585	22.08%
Whiteside	37,866	5,902	15.59%
Will	298,165	84,875	28.47%
Williamson	41,882	7,346	17.54%
Winnebago	179,548	45,632	25.41%
Woodford	22,982	7,399	32.19%
Total	7,137,954	2,067,824	28.97%

==== General election ====
For the general election, turnout was 71.34%, with 5,350,493 votes cast.

Turnout by county

County	Registration	Votes cast	Turnout%
Adams	42,498	31,723	74.65%
Alexander	7,399	4,252	57.47%
Bond	11,334	7,805	68.86%
Boone	29,480	19,572	66.39%
Brown	3,691	2,614	70.82%
Bureau	28,442	18,018	63.35%
Calhoun	3,870	2,825	73%
Carroll	12,817	8,189	63.89%
Cass	9,279	5,891	63.49%
Champaign	122,739	84,153	68.56%
Christian	23,406	15,771	67.38%
Clark	12,294	8,212	66.8%
Clay	9,715	6,770	69.69%
Clinton	26,841	17,263	64.32%
Coles	39,561	22,911	57.91%
Cook (Note: For more on Cook County general election turnout, see 2004 Cook County, Illinois elections#General election)	2,794,260	2,088,727	74.75%
Crawford	14,427	9,391	65.09%
Cumberland	7,888	5,482	69.5%
DeKalb	55,380	40,995	74.02%
DeWitt	13,055	7,853	60.15%
Douglas	12,747	8,597	67.44%
DuPage	530,732	404,117	76.14%
Edgar	12,730	8,772	68.91%
Edwards	5,372	3,487	64.91%
Effingham	22,043	16,812	76.27%
Fayette	14,659	9,828	67.04%
Ford	9,508	6,533	68.71%
Franklin	30,215	19,535	64.65%
Fulton	26,504	17,155	64.73%
Gallatin	4,542	3,343	73.6%
Greene	10,084	6,311	62.58%
Grundy	28,571	19,926	69.74%
Hamilton	6,583	4,630	70.33%
Hancock	13,713	10,354	75.5%
Hardin	3,958	2,664	67.31%
Henderson	5,412	4,197	77.55%
Henry	38,100	25,378	66.61%
Iroquois	20,588	13,894	67.49%
Jackson	43,381	26,524	61.14%
Jasper	7,359	5,395	73.31%
Jefferson	26,860	17,083	63.6%
Jersey	15,208	10,394	68.35%
Jo Daviess	16,472	11,867	72.04%
Johnson	7,463	5,944	79.65%
Kane	257,086	171,336	66.65%
Kankakee	61,607	45,297	73.53%
Kendall	48,962	33,345	68.1%
Knox	36,847	24,945	67.7%
Lake	382,835	276,609	72.25%
LaSalle	74,592	51,168	68.6%
Lawrence	11,300	6,796	60.14%
Lee	22,296	16,326	73.22%
Livingston	26,267	16,131	61.41%
Logan	20,569	13,542	65.84%
Macon	78,737	52,029	66.08%
Macoupin	34,818	22,925	65.84%
Madison	185,466	124,468	67.11%
Marion	30,672	17,304	56.42%
Marshall	9,395	6,641	70.69%
Mason	11,321	7,345	64.88%
Massac	12,045	7,506	62.32%
McDonough	20,629	15,038	72.9%
McHenry	186,394	128,454	68.92%
McLean	96,530	71,960	74.55%
Menard	9,433	6,622	70.2%
Mercer	14,325	9,217	64.34%
Monroe	21,992	16,708	75.97%
Montgomery	18,066	13,387	74.1%
Morgan	23,703	15,664	66.08%
Moultrie	9,857	6,515	66.1%
Ogle	36,472	24,207	66.37%
Peoria	120,530	84,454	70.07%
Perry	15,550	10,541	67.79%
Piatt	12,097	8,793	72.69%
Pike	12,477	8,334	66.79%
Pope	3,823	2,464	64.45%
Pulaski	6,311	3,108	49.25%
Putnam	4,587	3,482	75.91%
Randolph	25,571	15,686	61.34%
Richland	13,047	8,000	61.32%
Rock Island	104,030	70,308	67.58%
Saline	16,824	11,988	71.26%
Sangamon	126,669	97,327	76.84%
Schuyler	5,499	4,075	74.1%
Scott	4,011	2,653	66.14%
Shelby	17,509	10,648	60.81%
Stark	4,898	3,137	64.05%
St. Clair	192,432	114,559	59.53%
Stephenson	32,772	21,811	66.55%
Tazewell	93,272	63,788	68.39%
Union	16,206	9,199	56.76%
Vermilion	49,217	33,863	68.8%
Wabash	10,440	6,171	59.11%
Warren	12,227	8,522	69.7%
Washington	12,331	8,174	66.29%
Wayne	13,002	8,355	64.26%
White	11,580	8,367	72.25%
Whiteside	39,965	27,694	69.3%
Will	335,652	250,805	74.72%
Williamson	44,417	30,162	67.91%
Winnebago	194,530	122,459	62.95%
Woodford	24,616	18,924	76.88%
Total	7,499,488	5,350,493	71.34%

== Federal elections ==
=== United States President ===
Illinois voted for the Democratic ticket of John Kerry and John Edwards.

This was the fourth consecutive presidential election in which Illinois had voted for the Democratic ticket.

=== United States Senate ===
Incumbent first-term Republican Senator Peter Fitzgerald did not seek reelection. Democrat Barack Obama was elected to succeed him.

=== United States House ===
All 19 of Illinois’ seats in the United States House of Representatives were up for election in 2004.

The Democratic Party flipped one Republican-held seat, making the composition of Illinois' House delegation 10 Democrats and 9 Republicans.

== State elections ==
=== State Senate ===
2004 Illinois Senate election
- November 2, 2004

23 of 59 seats in the Illinois Senate 30 seats needed for a majority
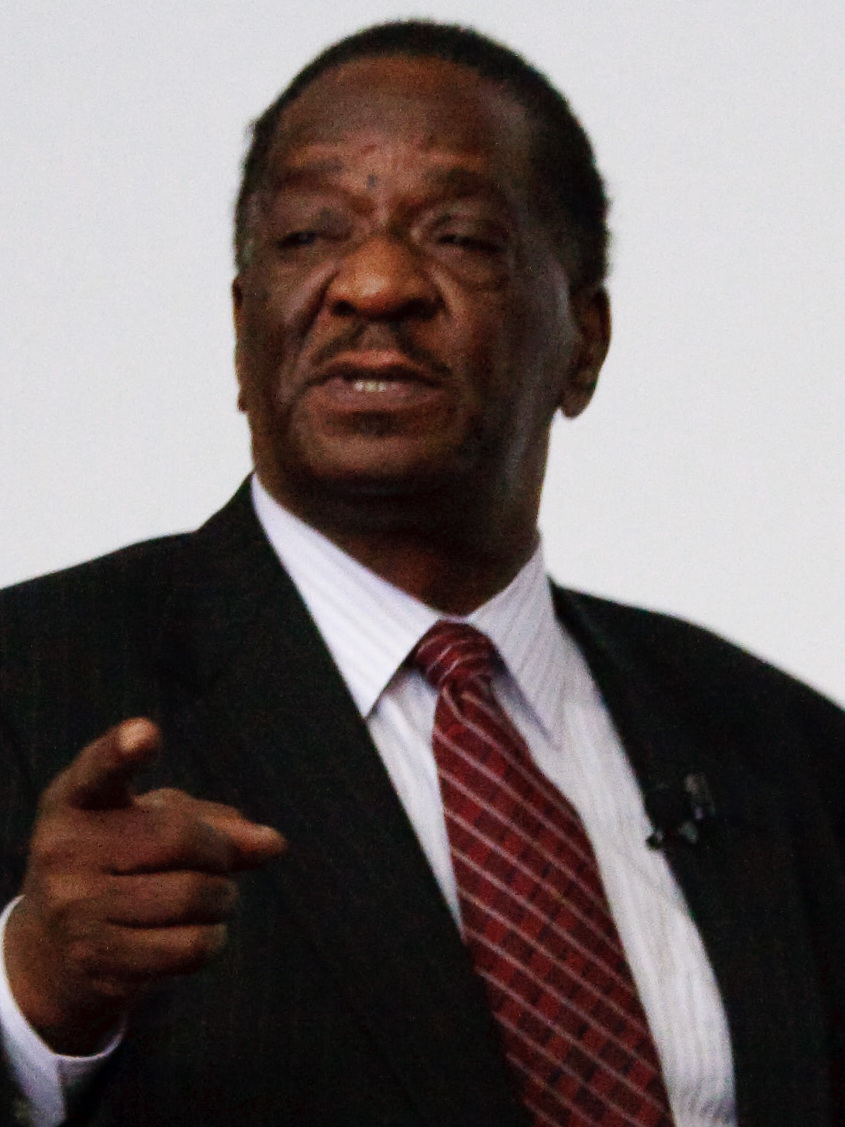

	Majority party	Minority party	Third party
Leader	Emil Jones	Frank Watson	N/A
Party	Democratic	Republican	Independent
Leader's seat	14th	51st	N/A
Last election	32	26	1
Seats won	31	27	1
Seat change	▼1	▲1	Steady
- Results: Republican gain Democratic hold Republican hold No election
President before election
Emil Jones
Democratic
Elected President
Emil Jones
Democratic

23 seats of the Illinois Senate were up for election in 2004. Democrats retained their control of the chamber.

=== State House of Representatives ===
2004 Illinois House of Representatives election
- November 2, 2004

All 118 seats in the Illinois House of Representatives 60 seats needed for a majority
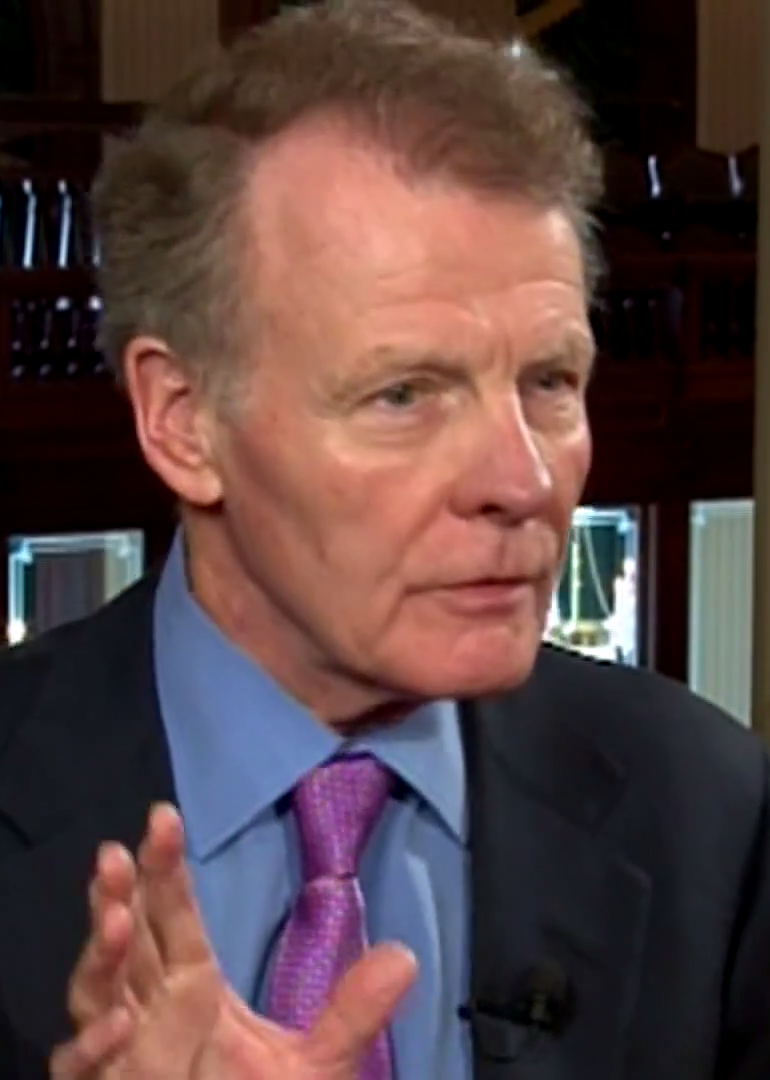

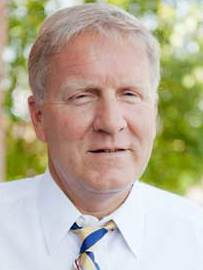
	Majority party	Minority party
Leader	Michael Madigan	Tom Cross
Party	Democratic	Republican
Leader's seat	22nd	97th
Last election	66	52
Seats won	65	53
Seat change	▼1	▲1
- Results: Democratic hold Democratic gain Republican hold Republican gain
Speaker before election
Michael Madigan
Democratic
Speaker-Elect
Michael Madigan
Democratic

All of the seats in the Illinois House of Representatives were up for election in 2004. Democrats retained their control of the chamber.

=== Judicial elections ===
Judicial elections were held.

== Local elections ==
Local elections were held. These included county elections, such as the Cook County elections.
