= Edward Petka =

American politician

Edward F. Petka (born March 10, 1943, Chicago, Illinois) is an American politician who served as a member of the Illinois General Assembly from 1987 until 2006.

Petka served as the State's Attorney for Will County, Illinois for four terms prior to being elected to the Illinois House of Representatives to succeed Dennis Hastert. An advocate for the death penalty, he was nicknamed "Electric Ed" for putting more people on death row than anyone else in Illinois history. He served in the Illinois House of Representatives from 1987 to 1993 and then as a Republican member of the Illinois Senate representing the 42nd district from 1993 to 2006. As a state senator, he worked with his colleague Barack Obama to reform the state's death-penalty process, mandating the videotaping of police interrogations in murder and homicide cases.

In 2006, Edward Petka opted to run for a judgeship on the 12th Circuit Court instead of running for reelection to the Illinois Senate. After the election, Edward Petka resigned effective December 4, 2006, to assume the judgeship and his wife Phyllis Petka was appointed to fill the vacancy. Phyllis Petka served for the remainder of the 94th General Assembly. The Petkas were succeeded by Democrat Linda Holmes, the winner of the 2006 general election. Edward Petka resigned from his judgeship in 2009. The Illinois Supreme Court appointed Raymond A. Bolden to succeed him.

Illinois House of Representatives
Preceded by Dennis Hastert	Member of the Illinois House of Representatives from the 82nd district 1987–1993	Succeeded by James H. Meyer
Illinois Senate
Preceded by Thomas A. "Tom" Dunn	Member of the Illinois Senate from the 42nd district 1993–2006	Succeeded by Phyllis Petka
