= Roger Jenisch =

American politician

Member of the Illinois House of Representatives from the 45th district
- In office January 2005 – January 2007
- Preceded by: Carole Pankau
- Succeeded by: Franco Coladipietro

Personal details
- Born: 1964 or 1965 (age 61–62) Addison, Illinois
- Party: Republican
- Profession: Real estate broker

Roger Jenisch was a Republican member of the Illinois State Representative for a single term from 2005 to 2007.

== Biography ==
Jenisch began his political career serving on a number of local boards and commissions including the Bloomingdale Commission and Zoning Appeals Board, Village of Addison Substance Responsibility Commission, and the Village of Addison Police Fire Merit Review Board. In 1997, after managing DuPage County Board member Floyd Sanford's successful campaign to become the Township Supervisor of Bloomingdale Township, Jenisch was appointed to replace Sanford on the DuPage County Board.

When then-State Representative Carole Pankau announced her plans to run for the Illinois Senate, Jenisch opted to run for her open seat in the 45th district. The 45th district included all or parts of Bloomingdale, Roselle, Glendale Heights, Carol Stream, Glen Ellyn, Itasca, Addison, Wheaton, and Winfield.

As a member of the Illinois House of Representatives he served on seven committees: Human Services, Insurance, Financial Institutions, Mass Transit, Revenue, Tourism and Conventions, and the KidCare Subcommittee. In 2006, property tax appeals attorney Franco Coladipietro, with the backing of local Republican organizations, challenged Jenisch in the Republican primary. Coladipietro won with a 6.2% margin of victory.

As of 2020, Jenisch is the managing broker and owner at EXIT Realty Redefined.

Preceded by Carole Pankau	Member of the Illinois House of Representatives from the 45th district 2005 - 2007	Succeeded by Franco Coladipietro
