= Rosemary Kurtz =

American educator and politician (1930–2026)

Member of the Illinois House of Representatives
- In office 2001–2005

Treasurer of Crystal Lake, Illinois
- In office 1997–2001

Personal details
- Born: August 11, 1930 Richmond, Indiana, U.S.
- Died: April 1, 2026 (aged 95)
- Party: Republican
- Education: University of Oklahoma (BA); University of Kansas (MA); University of Iowa
- Profession: Politician, educator

Rosemary Kurtz (August 11, 1930 – April 1, 2026) was an American educator and politician.

== Life and career ==
Born in Richmond, Indiana, on August 11, 1930, Kurtz received her bachelor's degree from the University of Oklahoma and her master's degree from the University of Kansas. She also studied at the University of Iowa. Kurtz taught in high school and college. Kurtz served as treasurer for the city of Crystal Lake, Illinois and on the Crystal Lake Zoning Board of Appeals. Kurtz served in the Illinois House of Representatives from 2001 to 2005 and was a Republican.

Kurtz died on April 1, 2026, at the age of 95.
