= Joel Brunsvold =

American politician (1942–2010)

Member of the Illinois House of Representatives from the 72nd district
- In office January 1983 – February 2003
- Preceded by: New District
- Succeeded by: Patrick J. Verschoore

Personal details
- Born: February 26, 1942 Mason City, Iowa
- Died: September 7, 2010 (aged 68) Iowa City, Iowa
- Resting place: Preemption Cemetery
- Party: Democratic
- Spouse: Barbara Bashaw (m.1964)
- Children: Timothy Joel Brunsvold; Theodore J. Brunsvold
- Education: Augustana College
- Profession: Teacher

Joel Brunsvold was an Illinois politician who served as a Democratic member of the Illinois House of Representatives and later as the Director of the Illinois Department of Natural Resources.

== Early life ==
Joel Brunsvold was born February 26, 1942, in Mason City, Iowa. Brunsvold's family later moved Wisconsin before settling in Rock Island where he graduated from Rock Island High School in 1960. He went on to study at Augustana College, where he earned a bachelor of arts and set multiple football records while playing for the Augustana Vikings that still stand today. During his last semester, he married his wife Barbara L. Bashaw.

== Political career ==
He became a teacher at Coyne Center Grade School and later Sherrad High School, where he taught science and coached football. Before entering politics full-time, he split his time between teaching and serving as a Milan Village Trustee, and later the Mayor of Milan. In 1982, he won election to the Illinois House of Representatives. As State Representative, Joel, at various times, was the chair of the Agriculture and Conservation Committee and the Elementary and Secondary Education Committee, respectively. He also served as the Democratic Caucus Chairman and an Assistant Majority Leader.

As a legislator, he was remembered for his advocacy for hunters including gun ownership, nature preservation and legislation related to the Illinois Department of Natural Resources. He founded and co-chaired the Illinois Legislative Sportsman’s Caucus, an organization that raised money and awareness for outdoor activities for disabled youth. A lifelong hunter, he cited those memories throughout his political career as his motivation.

In 2003, Governor Rod Blagojevich appointed Brunsvold to serve as the Director of the Illinois Department of Natural Resources where he managed a budget of $700 million. He resigned as Director in December 2005.

== Death and legacy ==
Mr. Brunsvold died September 7, 2010, at the University of Iowa Hospitals and Clinics after a massive stroke. In a statement, Gov. Pat Quinn referred to him as "a good man and a devoted public servant." He was memorialized on the floor of the Illinois Senate by Mike Jacobs later in the year. In the following session, Senator Jacobs proposed legislation to rename the Department of Natural Resources's headquarters after Joel Brunsvold.
