= Jerry L. Mitchell =

American politician

Member of the Illinois House of Representatives from the 90th district
- In office 1995 - 2012
- Succeeded by: Tom Demmer

Personal details
- Born: June 18, 1942 (age 83) Jacksonville, Illinois
- Party: Republican
- Spouse: Jan

Jerry L. Mitchell (born June 18, 1942) is a former Republican member of the Illinois House of Representatives, representing the 90th district from 1995 to 2012.
