= Joe Dunn (Illinois politician) =

American politician (born 1968)

Member of the Illinois House of Representatives from the 96th district
- In office 2003 - 2009
- Succeeded by: Darlene Senger

Personal details
- Born: February 1, 1968 (age 58) Bayonne, New Jersey
- Party: Republican
- Spouse: Alison
- Education: Northern Illinois University, DePaul University
- Profession: Certified Public Accountant

Joe Dunn is a Republican member of the Illinois House of Representatives, representing the 96th district from 2003 until January 2009. In July 2007 Dunn had announced that he would not seek reelection in 2008, citing family and his career as the primary reason for his decision.

Dunn has a Master of Business Administration from DePaul University and a bachelor's degree from Northern Illinois University.
