= John Philip Novak =

American politician and businessman

John Philip "Phil" Novak (born February 15, 1946) was an American politician and businessman.

Born in Berwyn, Illinois, Novak served in the United States Army from 1966 to 1968 and was stationed in the Panama Canal Zone. He received his bachelor's and master's degrees in education and political science from Eastern Illinois University. Novak was a personnel manager and labor relations director. He served on the Bradley, Illinois village board from 1975 to 1983. He then served as the Kankakee County, Illinois treasurer from 1982 to 1987 and was a Democrat. Novak was appointed to the Illinois House of Representatives in May 1987 after Charles Pangle resigned to take a position with the Illinois Department of Conservation at Kankakee River State Park. Novak then served in the Illinois House of Representatives from 1987 to 2003. He was succeeded in the Illinois House of Representatives by Lisa M. Dugan. Novak served as the Chairman of the Illinois Pollution Control Board from December 1, 2003, to November 30, 2005.
