= Sidney Mathias =

American politician

Member of the Illinois House of Representatives from the 53rd district
- In office 1999–2013
- Preceded by: Verna Taylor
- Succeeded by: Ed Sullivan

Personal details
- Party: Republican
- Spouse: Rita
- Profession: Attorney

Sidney Mathias is a former Republican member of the Illinois House of Representatives, who represented the 53rd district from 1999 to 2013. In 2012, Mathias was elected as an Alternate Delegate to the Republican National Convention committed to Mitt Romney.

Previously, he was Village President of Buffalo Grove.

== Electoral history ==
2012 Presidential Primary Election results in Alternate Delegate to National Nominating Convention, 10th District (3 seats elected)
Party	Candidate	Votes	%
Republican	Eric Scott Leys (Romney)	25,839	20.15
Republican	Sidney H. Mathias (Romney)	25,194	19.65
Republican	Sanford E. Perl (Romney)	23,660	18.45
Republican	Doug Kiscellus (Paul)	3,471	2.71
Republican	Michael Nash (Paul)	4,144	3.23
Republican	John Chiakulas (Paul)	3,446	2.69
Republican	John Anderson (Gingrich)	3,525	2.75
Republican	Peter Amarantos (Gingrich)	2,805	2.19
Republican	Hilary F. Till (Gingrich)	2,913	2.27
Republican	Michele Raymond (Santorum)	11,044	8.61
Republican	Jim Quirke (Santorum)	11,014	8.59
Republican	Rachael McCarthy (Santorum)	11,186	8.72
Total votes		128,241	100

2012 Presidential Primary Election results in Illinois State Representative, 59th District
Party	Candidate	Votes	%
Democratic	Carol Sente √	22,060	56.23
Republican	Sidney H. Mathias √	17,171	43.77
Total votes		39,231	100
