= Lisa M. Dugan =

American politician

Member of the Illinois House of Representatives from the 79th district
- In office December 1, 2003 – January 9, 2013
- Preceded by: John Philip Novak
- Succeeded by: Kate Cloonen

Personal details
- Born: September 20, 1955 (age 70)
- Party: Democratic
- Profession: IBEW Electrician

Lisa M. Dugan is a former Democratic member of the Illinois House of Representatives who represented the 79th District from January 2003 until January 2013. The district she represented included all or parts of Monee, Peotone, Manteno, Grant Park, Bradley, Kankakee, Aroma Park, St. Anne, Hopkins Park, Papineau, Martinton and Donovan.

== Early life and career ==
Dugan is an electrician by trade and currently a member of IBEW Local 176. A lifelong volunteer in the community, she has served on over fifty volunteer boards, and served as President of the Bradley-Bourbonnais Chamber of Commerce from 1998 to 2003.

== State representative ==
Incumbent Democrat Phil Novak of the 79th district was appointed chairman of the Illinois Pollution Control Board. Novak resigned effective December 1, 2003. The Democratic Representative Committee of the 79th Representative District appointed Dugan to fill the vacancy. She was sworn into office on December 1, 2003.

In the 97th General Assembly she was appointed to serve as the Chairperson of the House Agriculture & Conservation committee. Her committee assignments include Elementary & Secondary Education, State Government Administration (Vice-Chairperson), Health Care Availability Access, Veterans' Affairs, Tourism & Conventions and the Appropriations committee for Human Services.

Her associated Senator for a time was Toi Hutchinson, whom Dugan endorsed in the 2013 special election to succeed Jesse Jackson, Jr. as the representative from Illinois's 2nd congressional district.
