= Patrick J. Verschoore =

American politician

Patrick Verschoore
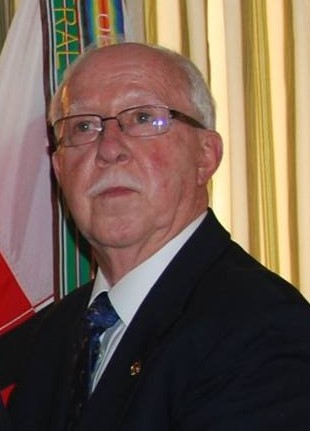
- Verschoore in 2015

Member of the Illinois House of Representatives from the 72nd district
- In office March 2003 – January 2017
- Preceded by: Joel Brunsvold
- Succeeded by: Michael Halpin

Personal details
- Born: November 30, 1943 (age 82) Rock Island, Illinois
- Party: Democratic
- Spouse: Charlene
- Occupation: Union plumber (retired)

Patrick J. Verschoore (born November 30, 1943) is an American retired politician. He served as a Democratic member of the Illinois House of Representatives, representing the 72nd District, from March 29, 2003 to January 2017.

The Democratic Representative Committee for the 72nd Representative District appointed Verschoore to fill the subsequent vacancy. He was sworn into office on March 29, 2003. For the 93rd General Assembly, his House committee assignments are to the Agriculture and Conservation, Appropriations—General Services, Computer Technology, and State Government Administration Committees. Verschoore did not run for re-election in the 2016 general election.
