= Kevin Joyce (politician) =

American politician

Member of the Illinois House of Representatives from the 35th district
- In office 2003–2010
- Preceded by: Maggie Crotty
- Succeeded by: John O'Sullivan

Personal details
- Party: Democratic
- Spouse: Krista
- Coaching career

Playing career
- 1989–1992: John Carroll
- Position: Defensive tackle

Coaching career (HC unless noted)
- 2001–2004: Saint Xavier (def. line)
- 2012: Ave Maria

Administrative career (AD unless noted)
- 2012: Ave Maria

Head coaching record
- Overall: 1–7

Kevin Carey Joyce is a former Democratic member of the Illinois House of Representatives who represented the 35th District from 2003 until 2010.

== Early life ==
Joyce was born in Chicago, Illinois. His father, Jeremiah E. Joyce, also served in the Illinois General Assembly. Joyce graduated from Marist High School (Chicago, Illinois) in 1989 and earned a Bachelor of Arts degree in political science from John Carroll University in 1993. He played for the John Carroll Blue Streaks football team and wrestled. Prior to being elected to the Illinois House of Representatives, Joyce worked for Waste Management. From 2001 to 2004, he was an assistant football coach at Saint Xavier University.

== Illinois House of Representatives ==
Joyce was first elected to the Illinois House of Representatives in 2002. He resigned in 2010 to accept a fundraising position with Ave Maria University, a private Roman Catholic university near Naples, Florida. He was succeeded in the Illinois House of Representatives by John O'Sullivan, the Democratic Committeeman from Worth Township.

== Post-legislative career ==
In 2012, he became Ave Maria's athletics director and head football coach. Later that year, he was named vice president for institutional advancement. He remained with the university until 2016, when he left for a position with Catholic Extension.

== Personal life ==
Joyce is the father of Michael Joyce, lead singer of the Florida country music band Back Country Boys.

== Head coaching record ==
Year	Team	Overall	Conference	Standing	Bowl/playoffs
Ave Maria Gyrenes (NAIA independent) (2012)
2012	Ave Maria	1–7			
Ave Maria:		1–7			
Total:		1–7			
