= Art Tenhouse =

American politician

Art Tenhouse (born December 27, 1950) was an American farmer, businessman, and politician.

Born in Quincy, Illinois, Tenhouse received his bachelor's degree in economics/agricultural science and his master's in finance accounting from University of Illinois He was one of the owners of "Four-Ten-Farms." From 1989 to 2006, Tenhouse served in the Illinois House of Representatives and was a Republican. In 2006, Tenhouse resigned from the Illinois General Assembly when he was named vice-president of the Illinois CPA Society which is based in Springfield, Illinois.
