= Bob Biggins =

American politician

Member of the Illinois House of Representatives from the 41st district
- In office January 13, 1993 – January 13, 2011
- Preceded by: Terry A. Steczo
- Succeeded by: Chris Nybo

Personal details
- Born: October 20, 1946 (age 79) Oak Park, Illinois
- Party: Republican
- Spouse: Judy

Bob Biggins (born 1946) is a former Republican member of the Illinois House of Representatives, representing the 41st district from 1993 to 2011. He retired in 2010.

Robert Biggins was born on October 20, 1946, in Oak Park, Illinois. Biggins has a Bachelor of Arts Degree in Education from Northeastern Illinois University.

In 1973, Biggins was elected as a Democrat to serve as the Assessor of Addison Township. He was elected as a Republican to the Illinois House of Representatives in 1990. Representative Biggins was the Republican Spokesperson for the Appropriations-General Services Committee, and served on six other committees: Aging, Executive, Mass Transit, Revenue and Finance, Tollway Oversight.

During the 2008 Republican Party presidential primaries, Biggins served on the Illinois leadership team of the presidential campaign of former New York City Mayor Rudy Giuliani.

On April 11, 2011, Governor Pat Quinn reappointed Biggins to the Board of Trustees for Northeastern Illinois University for a term starting October 28, 2011, and ending January 21, 2013, to replace Edward G. Dykla. Biggins was confirmed by the Illinois Senate on January 31, 2012. On April 11, 2013, Governor Pat Quinn reappointed Biggins to the Board of Trustees for Northeastern Illinois University for a term starting March 29, 2013, and ending January 21, 2019. Biggins was confirmed for the six-year term by the Illinois Senate on May 30, 2013.

Robert Biggins is married to Judy and together they have two children.

Robert Biggins has been a member of the following organizations: Board of Directors, Suburban Bank of Elmhurst, 1975–present, Chair/Board of Directors, Suburban Bank of Elmhurst, 1983-1984.
