= Tom Cross (politician) =

American politician

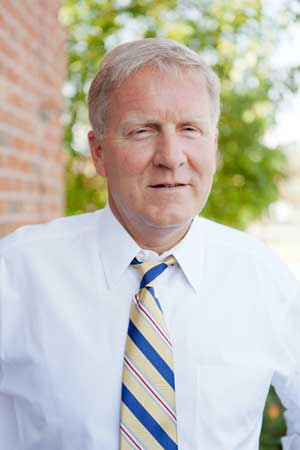

Member of the Illinois House of Representatives from the 97th district
- In office January 1993 – January 14, 2015
- Succeeded by: Mark Batinick

Minority Leader of the Illinois House of Representatives
- In office 8 January 2003 – August 29, 2013
- Preceded by: Lee Daniels
- Succeeded by: Jim Durkin

Personal details
- Born: July 31, 1958 (age 68) Nashville, Tennessee, U.S.
- Party: Republican
- Spouse: Genie Cross
- Children: 2
- Education: Cumberland Law School; Illinois Wesleyan University
- Profession: Attorney

Tom Cross (born July 31, 1958) is an American lawyer and former Republican member of the Illinois House of Representatives where he served from 1993 to 2015. He served as House Minority Leader from January 2002 to August 2013, when he resigned to run for Illinois Treasurer.

== Early life and career ==
Cross served as an assistant state's attorney for Kendall County, Illinois, for eight years prior to his election to the Illinois House in the 1992 election.

== Political career ==
During his time as House Republican leader, Cross joined with then Senate Republican leader Frank Watson to referee the "rancorous" relationship between House and Senate Democrats and Democratic Governor Rod Blagojevich.

During the 2008 Republican Party presidential primaries, Cross served as the Illinois state chairman for the presidential campaign of Rudy Giuliani. In February 2009, Cross and fellow Republican, ranking impeachment committee member Jim Durkin, spoke out about a follow-on controversy over the impeachment testimony of then-U.S. Senator Roland Burris. Burris had been named by Blagojevich to fill President Barack Obama's Senate seat, after the emergence of the corruption charges against Blagojevich but before Blagojevich's removal from office.

Burris had reportedly not mentioned fund-raising contacts allegedly made to him by Blagojevich's brother, Robert Blagojevich, in his testimony, but then filed an affidavit with Democratic impeachment committee chair Barbara Flynn Currie, listing three such contacts, shortly after February 5. Word of the new information did not reach the public, or the Republicans in the House, until its release in the Chicago Sun-Times on February 13. Cross was quoted as saying "We [Republicans] find it ironic that at the same time Democrats are forming a new committee to clean up corruption, they are sitting on critical information related to the biggest corruption scandal our state has ever seen."

=== 2014 Candidacy for Illinois Treasurer ===
Incumbent Treasurer Dan Rutherford ran for Illinois Governor, leaving the seat of Illinois Treasurer open. After considering running for Illinois Attorney General, Cross decided to run for Treasurer. He faced DuPage County Auditor Bob Grogan in the Republican primary on March 18, 2014, but defeated him, 57% to 43%. Cross went on to face Democratic nominee Mike Frerichs in the general election on November 4, 2014. During the election, he was endorsed by former Treasurer and Democrat Alexi Giannoulias.

For more than two weeks after election day, the election was too close to call, but eventually Frerichs emerged as the winner of the race with a lead of over 9,000 votes out of more than 3.5 million ballots cast.

== Post political career ==
In 2015, he joined Aurora University as distinguished fellow.

== Personal life ==
Tom lives in Oswego with his wife and two children.

In April 2016, Cross's brother Scott came forward as being "Individual D" in the trial of former U.S. House Speaker Dennis Hastert. Scott Cross testified that, in 1979, while a student at Yorkville High School, he was one of the victims of sexual abuse by Hastert, who was at that time a teacher and wrestling coach at that school. Tom Cross, unaware of the incident, subsequently became a political protege of Hastert's. After Scott Cross's testimony, Tom Cross issued a statement on behalf of the Cross family that said "We are very proud of Scott for having the courage to relive this very painful part of his life in order to ensure that justice is done today.. We hope his testimony will provide courage and strength to other victims of other cases of abuse to speak out and advocate for themselves.".

Party political offices
Preceded by Dan Rutherford	Republican nominee for Illinois Treasurer; 2014	Succeeded by Jim Dodge
