= James H. Meyer =

American politician

Member of the Illinois House of Representatives from the 48th district
- In office 1993 - 2009
- Succeeded by: Michael Connelly

Personal details
- Born: October 28, 1943 (age 82) Sibley, Iowa
- Party: Republican
- Spouse: Bonnie
- Profession: insurance agent

James H. Meyer, known as 'Jim' Meyer, was a Republican member of the Illinois House of Representatives from 1993 until his retirement at the end of his term in January 2009.

== Biography ==
Meyer received a Bachelor of Arts in political science and history from Upper Iowa University. He served in the Vietnam War as a member of the United States Air Force. He served as a deputy mayor and village trustee of Bolingbrook, as a member of Congressman Harris Fawell's science and technology advisory committee and as a vice president of the northern Illinois chapter of the Cystic Fibrosis Foundation.

== Illinois House of Representatives ==
In the 1992 general election, Meyer was elected to represent the 82nd district.
