= Maggie Crotty =

American politician (1948–2020)

Bremen Township Supervisor
- In office May 2005 – September 2020
- Preceded by: John A. Daly

Member of the Illinois Senate from the 19th district
- In office January 8, 2003 – January 9, 2009
- Preceded by: William F. Mahar Jr.
- Succeeded by: Michael Hastings

Personal details
- Born: October 16, 1948 Chicago, Illinois
- Died: November 5, 2020 (aged 72)
- Party: Democratic
- Other political affiliations: Bremen Tax Cut Party
- Children: Three

Mary Margaret "Maggie" Crotty (née Kunis; October 16, 1948 – November 5, 2020) was an American politician who served as the Bremen Township Supervisor from 2005 to 2020 and as a Democratic member of the Illinois Senate, representing the 19th district from 2003 to 2013. She was Chairperson of the Elections Committee, Vice-Chairperson of the Local Government Committee, and was a member of the Higher Education, Labor, and Revenue Committees. She announced she would not be seeking reelection after her term expired in 2013.

== Early life and career ==
Throughout Crotty's professional career she maintained memberships to various organizations such as: Metropolitan Services Community Advisory Board, present Member, Oak Forest Lions Club, present Chair, School District 228 Education Foundation, present Member, South Star Services Advisory Board, present Member, South Suburban College History Round Table, present Honorary Member, United Cerebral Palsy of Greater Chicago Board of Directors, present Board Member, Crisis Center of South Suburbia, 2002-2006 Past President, Oak Forest Kiwanis Club, 1990-1992 Member/Past President, Oak Forest High School Football Booster Club Past Member/Secretary, Oak Forest Civil Service Commission. Crotty continued to be active in the community by volunteering for many not-for-profit organizations and boards.

== Illinois House of Representatives ==
Crotty served three terms as an Illinois State Representative, first elected in 1996. Prior to joining the Illinois General Assembly, she worked for the Southwest Cook County Cooperative for Special Education.

== Illinois State Senate ==
Crotty was elected to the Illinois Senate after 19th district incumbent William Mahar, Jr. was drawn into a district with Christine Radogno leaving an opening in the 19th district.

While in the Illinois Senate, Crotty's legislative priorities included health issues and education. She passed legislation to expand state reading assistance grants to grades 7 through 12. Another legislative goal was to increase the state reimbursement rate to school districts for providing special education. She was a co-sponsor of a Bill to create a state administered prescription drug discount buying group for seniors. Beginning in January 2004, seniors were able to save up to 50% on the cost of prescription drugs.

As a supporter of children with special needs, Crotty helped secure a bill that appropriates $10,200,000 from the General Revenue Fund to the Department of Human Services. The funds will be allocated for a grant to the Autism Program for an Autism Diagnostic Education Program for young children.

Crotty was a supporter of better living for all citizens; in 2009 she helped pass a bill which Appropriates $64,200,000 from the General Revenue Fund to the Department on Aging for vendors of homemaker, chore, and housekeeping services to increase the wages paid to employees who provide homemaker, chore, and housekeeping services and to provide health insurance coverage to those employees and their dependents. This bill allowed individuals involved to have an opportunity to receive insurance based upon the additional pay increase.

Crotty sponsored many important initiatives to boost the state's share of education funding. She played a major role in passing a "Silver Alert" system for Illinois. Based on the "AMBER Alert" system that warns expressway and interstate motorists of missing or abducted children, Crotty's initiative permits law enforcement to provide alerts for missing and endangered seniors and the disabled.

== Post-legislative career ==
At the time of her death, Crotty was the supervisor of Bremen Township, Illinois.

On December 30, 2013, Senate President John Cullerton appointed Crotty to a five-year term as a trustee for the Illinois Clean Energy Community Foundation. The ten member trust provides financial support and assistance to entities, public or private, within the state of Illinois including, but not limited to, units of state and local government, educational institutions, corporations, etc., for improving energy efficiency.

== Awards ==
Senator Crotty received the following awards:

- General Excellence Award;
- Illinois State Crime Commission, 2000;
- Legislator of the Year;
- Illinois Association of Park Districts, 2000;
- Friend of Taxpayers Award;
- Nation Taxpayers United of Illinois, 1999;
- Outstanding Freshman Legislator; and
- Illinois Health Care Association

== Personal life ==
Crotty was born in Chicago, Illinois, and was a graduate of Mercy High School. She died on November 5, 2020, at age 72.
