= 2010 Illinois House of Representatives election =

- November 2, 2010

All 118 seats in the Illinois House of Representatives 60 seats needed for a majority
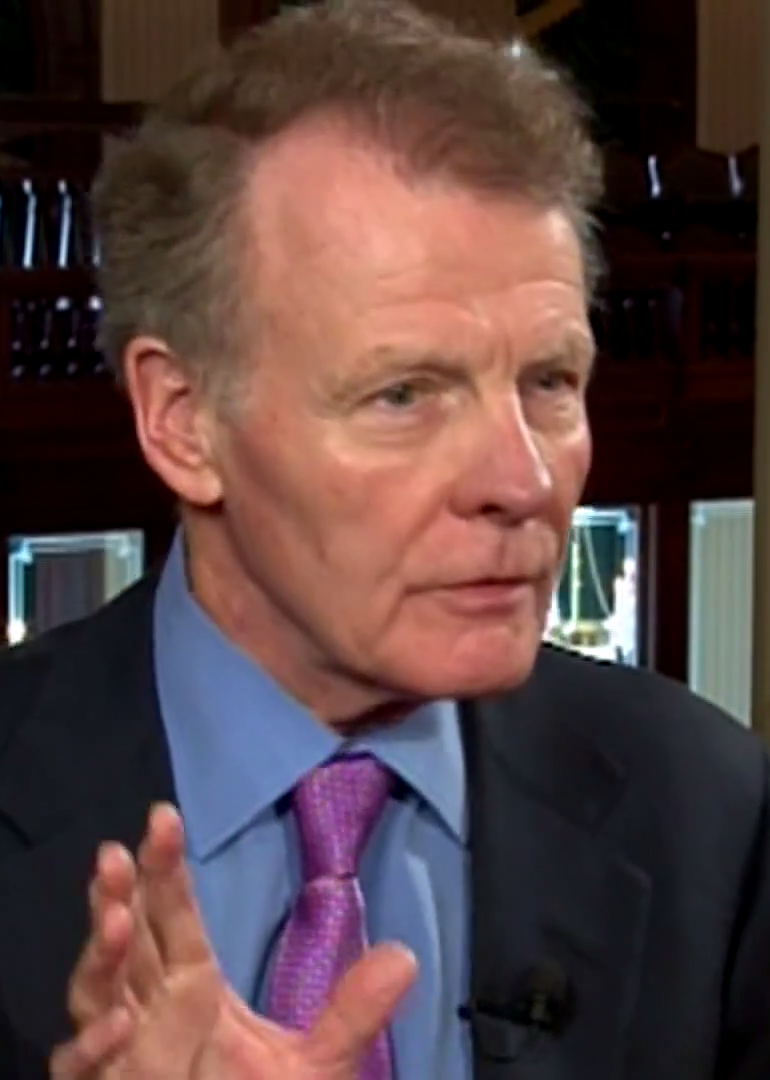

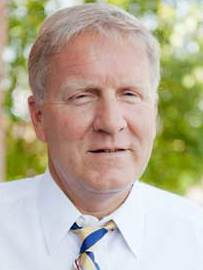
| | Majority party | Minority party |
|---|---|---|
| Leader | Michael Madigan | Tom Cross |
| Party | Democratic | Republican |
| Leader's seat | 22nd-Chicago | 97th-Oswego |
| Last election | 70 | 48 |
| Seats won | 64 | 54 |
| Seat change | ▼6 | ▲6 |
| Popular vote | 1,739,241 | 1,649,274 |
| Percentage | 50.62% | 48.01% |
| Swing | ▼7.40% | ▲7.41% |
- Democratic gain Republican gain Democratic hold Republican hold 50–60% 60–70% 70–80% 80–90% >90% 50–60% 60–70% 70–80% 80–90% >90%
Speaker before election
Michael Madigan
Democratic
Speaker-Elect
Michael Madigan
Democratic

The 2010 Elections for the Illinois House of Representatives was conducted on Tuesday, November 2, 2010. The 2010 primary election was conducted on Tuesday, February 2, 2010. State Representatives are elected for two-year terms, with the entire House of Representatives up for a vote every two years.

== Overview ==
Illinois State House Elections, 2010
| Party | Votes | Percentage | Seats before | Seats after | +/– |
|---|---|---|---|---|---|
| Democratic | 1,739,241 | 50.62% | 70 | 64 | -6 |
| Republican | 1,649,274 | 48.01% | 48 | 54 | +6 |
| Green | 31,974 | 0.93% | 0 | 0 | 0 |
| Independent | 15,057 | 0.44% | 0 | 0 | 0 |
| Totals | 3,435,546 | 100.00% | 118 | 118 | — |

== Predictions ==
| Source | Ranking | As of |
|---|---|---|
| Governing | Lean D | November 1, 2010 |

== General election ==
The 2010 general election resulted in a net gain of 5 seats for the Republican Party.

| District | Party | Incumbent | Status | Party | Candidate | Votes | % |
|---|---|---|---|---|---|---|---|
| 1 | Democratic | Susana Mendoza | Won reelection | Democratic | ✓ Susana Mendoza | 7,210 | 100% |
| 2 | Democratic | Edward Acevedo | Won reelection | Democratic | ✓ Edward Acevedo | | 100% |
| 3 | Democratic | Luis Arroyo | Won reelection | Democratic | ✓ Luis Arroyo | | 100% |
| 4 | Democratic | Cynthia Soto | Won reelection | Democratic | ✓ Cynthia Soto | | 100% |
| 5 | Democratic | Kenneth Dunkin | Won reelection | Democratic | ✓ Kenneth Dunkin | | 100% |
| 6 | Democratic | Esther Golar | Won reelection | Democratic | ✓ Esther Golar | | 100% |
| 7 | Democratic | Karen Yarbrough | Won reelection | Democratic | ✓ Karen Yarbrough | | 100% |
| 8 | Democratic | LaShawn Ford | Won reelection | Democratic | ✓ LaShawn Ford | | 100% |
| 9 | Democratic | Arthur Turner | Incumbent retired. Democratic hold. | Democratic | ✓ Arthur Turner | | 100% |
| 10 | Democratic | Annazette Collins | Won reelection | Democratic | ✓ Annazette Collins | | 100% |
| 11 | Democratic | John Fritchey | Incumbent retired. New member elected. Democratic hold. | Democratic | ✓ Ann M. Williams | | |
| 11 | Democratic | John Fritchey | Incumbent retired. New member elected. Democratic hold. | Republican | Scott Tucker | | |
| 12 | Democratic | Sara Feigenholtz | Won reelection | Democratic | ✓ Sara Feigenholtz | | |
| 12 | Democratic | Sara Feigenholtz | Won reelection | Republican | Dave Lenkowski | | |
| 13 | Democratic | Greg Harris | Won reelection | Democratic | ✓ Greg Harris | | 100% |
| 14 | Democratic | Harry Osterman | Won reelection | Democratic | ✓ Harry Osterman | | 100% |
| 15 | Democratic | John D'Amico | Won reelection | Democratic | ✓ John D'Amico | | 100% |
| 16 | Democratic | Lou Lang | Won reelection | Democratic | ✓ Lou Lang | | 100% |
| 17 | Republican | Elizabeth Coulson | Retired. Democratic pickup. | Republican | Hamilton Chang | | |
| 17 | Republican | Elizabeth Coulson | Retired. Democratic pickup. | Democratic | ✓ Daniel Biss | | |
| 18 | Democratic | Julie Hamos | retired | Democratic | ✓ Robyn Gabel | | 100% |
| 19 | Democratic | Joseph M. Lyons | Won reelection | Democratic | ✓ Joseph M. Lyons | | |
| 19 | Democratic | Joseph M. Lyons | Won reelection | Republican | David J. Anderson | | |
| 20 | Republican | Michael P. McAuliffe | Won reelection | Republican | ✓ Michael P. McAuliffe | | 100% |
| 21 | Democratic | Michael J. Zalewski | Won reelection | Democratic | ✓ Michael J. Zalewski | | 100% |
| 22 | Democratic | Mike Madigan | Won reelection | Democratic | ✓ Mike Madigan | | |
| 22 | Democratic | Mike Madigan | Won reelection | Republican | Patrick John Ryan | | |
| 23 | Democratic | Daniel J. Burke | Won reelection | Democratic | ✓ Daniel J. Burke | | 100% |
| 24 | Democratic | Elizabeth Hernandez | Won reelection | Democratic | ✓ Elizabeth Hernandez | | 100% |
| 25 | Democratic | Barbara Flynn Currie | Won reelection | Democratic | ✓ Barbara Flynn Currie | | 100% |
| 26 | Democratic | William D. Burns | Won reelection | Democratic | ✓ William D. Burns | | |
| 26 | Democratic | William D. Burns | Won reelection | Republican | Sylvester 'Junebug' Hendricks | | |
| 27 | Democratic | Monique D. Davis | Won reelection | Democratic | ✓ Monique D. Davis | | 100% |
| 28 | Democratic | Robert Rita | Won reelection | Democratic | ✓ Robert Rita | | 100% |
| 29 | Democratic | David E. Miller | Incumbent running for State Comptroller. Democratic hold | Democratic | ✓ Thaddeus Jones | | |
| 29 | Democratic | David E. Miller | Incumbent running for State Comptroller. Democratic hold | Green | Kenneth "Kenny" Williams | | |
| 30 | Democratic | William Davis | Won reelection | Democratic | ✓ William Davis | | 100% |
| 31 | Democratic | Mary E. Flowers | Won reelection | Democratic | ✓ Mary E. Flowers | | 100% |
| 32 | Democratic | André Thapedi | Won reelection | Democratic | ✓ André Thapedi | | 100% |
| 33 | Democratic | Marlow H. Colvin | Won reelection | Democratic | ✓ Marlow H. Colvin | | 100% |
| 34 | Democratic | Constance A. Howard | Won reelection | Democratic | ✓ Constance A. Howard | | 100% |
| 35 | Democratic | Kevin Joyce | Won reelection | Democratic | ✓ Kevin Joyce | | |
| 35 | Democratic | Kevin Joyce | Won reelection | Republican | Barbara Ruth Bellar | | |
| 36 | Democratic | Michael J. Carberry | Incumbent retired. Democratic hold. | Democratic | ✓ Kelly M. Burke | 21,874 | 8,799 |
| 36 | Democratic | Michael J. Carberry | Incumbent retired. Democratic hold. | Republican | Richard L. Grabowski | 8,799 | 28.68 |
| 36 | Democratic | Michael J. Carberry | Incumbent retired. Democratic hold. | Independent | Timothy Haines (write-in) | 8 | 0.03 |
| 37 | Democratic | Kevin A. McCarthy | Won reelection | Democratic | ✓ Kevin A. McCarthy | | |
| 37 | Democratic | Kevin A. McCarthy | Won reelection | Republican | Jeffrey L. Junkas | | |
| 38 | Democratic | Al Riley | Won reelection | Democratic | ✓ Al Riley | | 100% |
| 39 | Democratic | Toni Berrios | Won reelection | Democratic | ✓ Maria Antonia Berrios | | |
| 39 | Democratic | Toni Berrios | Won reelection | Green | Jeremy Karpen | | |
| 40 | Democratic | Deborah Mell | Won reelection | Democratic | ✓ Deborah Mell | 11,899 | 100% |
| 41 | Republican | Bob Biggins | Retired. Republican hold | Republican | ✓ Chris Nybo | | |
| 41 | Republican | Bob Biggins | Retired. Republican hold | Democratic | Brian J. Stephenson | | |
| 42 | Republican | Sandra M. Pihos | Won reelection | Republican | ✓ Sandra M. Pihos | | |
| 42 | Republican | Sandra M. Pihos | Won reelection | Democratic | Kathryn F. Vlahos | | |
| 43 | Democratic | Keith Farnham | Won reelection | Democratic | ✓ Keith Farnham | | |
| 43 | Democratic | Keith Farnham | Won reelection | Republican | Ruth Munson | | |
| 44 | Democratic | Fred Crespo | Won reelection | Democratic | ✓ Fred Crespo | | |
| 44 | Democratic | Fred Crespo | Won reelection | Republican | Billie D. Roth | | |
| 45 | Republican | Franco Coladipietro | Won reelection | Republican | ✓ Franco Coladipietro | | |
| 45 | Republican | Franco Coladipietro | Won reelection | Democratic | Jim Hagerty | | |
| 46 | Republican | Dennis Reboletti | Won reelection | Republican | ✓ Dennis Reboletti | | |
| 46 | Republican | Dennis Reboletti | Won reelection | Democratic | Deborah O'Keefe Conroy | | |
| 47 | Republican | Patricia R. Bellock | Won reelection | Republican | ✓ Patricia R. Bellock | | |
| 47 | Republican | Patricia R. Bellock | Won reelection | Green | Bob Mueller | | |
| 47 | Republican | Patricia R. Bellock | Won reelection | Democratic | Jim Speta | | |
| 48 | Republican | Michael Connelly | Won reelection | Republican | ✓ Michael Connelly | | |
| 48 | Republican | Michael Connelly | Won reelection | Democratic | Barbara Green | | |
| 49 | Republican | Timothy L. Schmitz | Won reelection | Republican | ✓ Timothy L. Schmitz | | |
| 49 | Republican | Timothy L. Schmitz | Won reelection | Democratic | Jennifer Barconi | | |
| 50 | Republican | Kay Hatcher | Won reelection | Republican | ✓ Kay Hatcher | | |
| 50 | Republican | Kay Hatcher | Won reelection | Democratic | Linda Healy | | |
| 51 | Republican | Ed Sullivan, Jr. | Won reelection | Republican | ✓ Ed Sullivan, Jr. | | |
| 51 | Republican | Ed Sullivan, Jr. | Won reelection | Democratic | Steve Riess | | |
| 52 | Republican | Mark H. Beaubien, Jr. | Won reelection | Republican | ✓ Mark H. Beaubien, Jr. | | 100% |
| 53 | Republican | Sidney Mathias | Won reelection | Republican | ✓ Sidney Mathias | | |
| 53 | Republican | Sidney Mathias | Won reelection | Democratic | Linda Birnbaum | | |
| 54 | Republican | Suzanne Bassi | lost in primary. Republican hold. | Republican | ✓ Tom Morrison | | |
| 54 | Republican | Suzanne Bassi | lost in primary. Republican hold. | Democratic | Matt Flamm | | |
| 55 | Republican | Randy Ramey, Jr. | Won reelection | Republican | ✓ Randy Ramey, Jr. | | |
| 55 | Republican | Randy Ramey, Jr. | Won reelection | Democratic | Gregory Brownfield | | |
| 56 | Democratic | Paul D. Froehlich | retired | Democratic | ✓ Michelle Mussman | | |
| 56 | Democratic | Paul D. Froehlich | retired | Republican | Ryan Higgins | | |
| 57 | Democratic | Elaine Nekritz | Won reelection | Democratic | ✓ Elaine Nekritz | | |
| 57 | Democratic | Elaine Nekritz | Won reelection | Republican | Richard Hamen | | |
| 58 | Democratic | Karen May | Won reelection | Democratic | ✓ Karen May | | |
| 58 | Democratic | Karen May | Won reelection | Republican | Lauren Turelli | | |
| 59 | Democratic | Carol Sente | Won reelection | Democratic | ✓ Carol Sente | | |
| 59 | Democratic | Carol Sente | Won reelection | Republican | Dan Sugue | | |
| 60 | Democratic | Eddie Washington | died June 4, 2010 | Democratic | ✓ Rita Mayfield | | 100% |
| 61 | Republican | JoAnn D. Osmond | | Republican | ✓ JoAnn D. Osmond | | |
| 61 | Republican | JoAnn D. Osmond | | Democratic | Scott D. Pollock | | |
| 62 | Republican | Sandy Cole | Won reelection | Republican | ✓ Sandy Cole | | |
| 62 | Republican | Sandy Cole | Won reelection | Democratic | Rich Voltair | | |
| 63 | Democratic | Jack D. Franks | Won reelection | Democratic | ✓ Jack D. Franks | | |
| 63 | Democratic | Jack D. Franks | Won reelection | Republican | John O'Neill | | |
| 64 | Republican | Michael Tryon | Won reelection | Republican | ✓ Michael W. Tryon | | |
| 64 | Republican | Michael Tryon | Won reelection | Democratic | Robert Kaempfe | | |
| 65 | Republican | Rosemary Mulligan | Won reelection | Republican | ✓ Rosemary Mulligan | | |
| 65 | Republican | Rosemary Mulligan | Won reelection | Democratic | Wendy Gruen | | |
| 66 | Democratic | Mark L. Walker | Lost reelection. Republican pickup | Democratic | Mark L. Walker | | |
| 66 | Democratic | Mark L. Walker | Lost reelection. Republican pickup | Republican | ✓ David Harris | | |
| 67 | Democratic | Charles E. Jefferson | Won reelection | Democratic | ✓ Charles E. Jefferson | | |
| 67 | Democratic | Charles E. Jefferson | Won reelection | Republican | Robert E. Brokish, Jr. | | |
| 68 | Republican | Dave Winters | Won reelection | Republican | ✓ Dave Winters | | |
| 68 | Republican | Dave Winters | Won reelection | Democratic | Marla Jean Wilson | | |
| 68 | Republican | Dave Winters | Won reelection | Green | Gerry Woods | | |
| 69 | Republican | Ronald A. Wait | Incumbent retired. Republican hold. | Republican | ✓ Joe Sosnowski | | |
| 69 | Republican | Ronald A. Wait | Incumbent retired. Republican hold. | Democratic | Ray Pendzinski | | |
| 69 | Republican | Ronald A. Wait | Incumbent retired. Republican hold. | Green | Dan Lindsey | | |
| 70 | Republican | Robert W. Pritchard | Won reelection | Republican | ✓ Robert W. Pritchard | | 100% |
| 71 | Democratic | Mike Boland | Retired to run for Lieutenant Governor. Republican pick up | Democratic | Dennis Ahern | | |
| 71 | Democratic | Mike Boland | Retired to run for Lieutenant Governor. Republican pick up | Republican | ✓ Richard Morthland | | |
| 72 | Democratic | Patrick J. Verschoore | | Democratic | ✓ Patrick J. Verschoore | | |
| 72 | Democratic | Patrick J. Verschoore | | Republican | Mark Lioen | | |
| 73 | Republican | David R. Leitch | Won reelection | Republican | ✓ David R. Leitch | | 100% |
| 74 | Republican | Donald L. Moffitt | | Republican | ✓ Donald L. Moffitt | | |
| 74 | Republican | Donald L. Moffitt | | Democratic | Elizabeth Double | | |
| 75 | Democratic | Careen M. Gordon | Incumbent lost. Republican pick-up | Democratic | Careen M. Gordon | | |
| 75 | Democratic | Careen M. Gordon | Incumbent lost. Republican pick-up | Republican | ✓ Sue Rezin | | |
| 76 | Democratic | Frank J. Mautino | Won reelection | Democratic | ✓ Frank J. Mautino | | 100% |
| 77 | Republican | Angelo Saviano | | Republican | ✓ Angelo Saviano | | 100% |
| 78 | Democratic | Deborah L. Graham | Won reelection | Democratic | ✓ Camille Lilly | | 100% |
| 79 | Democratic | Lisa M. Dugan | Won reelection | Democratic | ✓ Lisa M. Dugan | | |
| 79 | Democratic | Lisa M. Dugan | Won reelection | Republican | Nick Been | | |
| 79 | Democratic | Lisa M. Dugan | Won reelection | Green | George Ochsenfeld | | |
| 80 | Democratic | Anthony DeLuca | Won reelection | Democratic | ✓ Anthony DeLuca | | 100% |
| 81 | Republican | Renee Kosel | | Democratic | John G. Unhoch | | |
| 81 | Republican | Renee Kosel | | Republican | ✓ Renee Kosel | | |
| 82 | Republican | Jim Durkin | | Republican | ✓ Jim Durkin | | |
| 82 | Republican | Jim Durkin | | Democratic | Matthew T. Mostowik | | |
| 83 | Democratic | Linda Chapa LaVia | Won reelection | Democratic | ✓ Linda Chapa LaVia | | 100% |
| 84 | Republican | Tom Cross | Won reelection | Republican | ✓ Tom Cross | | |
| 84 | Republican | Tom Cross | Won reelection | Democratic | Dennis Grosskopf | | |
| 85 | Democratic | Emily McAsey | Won reelection | Democratic | ✓ Emily McAsey | | |
| 85 | Democratic | Emily McAsey | Won reelection | Republican | Maripat Oliver | | |
| 86 | Democratic | Jack McGuire | Won reelection | Democratic | ✓ Jack McGuire | | |
| 86 | Democratic | Jack McGuire | Won reelection | Republican | Ryan Eggert | | |
| 87 | Republican | Bill Mitchell | Won reelection | Republican | ✓ Bill Mitchell | | |
| 87 | Republican | Bill Mitchell | Won reelection | Democratic | George H. Wissmiller | | |
| 88 | Republican | Dan Brady | Won reelection | Republican | ✓ Dan Brady | | 100% |
| 89 | Republican | Jim Sacia | Won reelection | Republican | ✓ Jim Sacia | | |
| 89 | Republican | Jim Sacia | Won reelection | Democratic | Victoria F. Grizzoffi | | |
| 90 | Republican | Jerry L. Mitchell | Won reelection | Republican | ✓ Jerry L. Mitchell | | |
| 90 | Republican | Jerry L. Mitchell | Won reelection | Democratic | Kenneth J. Novak | | |
| 91 | Democratic | Michael K. Smith | Incumbent lost. Republican pickup. | Democratic | Michael K. Smith | | |
| 91 | Democratic | Michael K. Smith | Incumbent lost. Republican pickup. | Republican | ✓ Michael D. Unes | | |
| 92 | Democratic | Jehan Gordon | Won reelection | Democratic | Jehan Gordon | | |
| 92 | Democratic | Jehan Gordon | Won reelection | Republican | Jim Montelongo | | |
| 93 | Republican | Jil Tracy | Won reelection | Republican | ✓ Jil Tracy | | 100% |
| 94 | Republican | Richard P. Myers | | Republican | ✓ Richard P. Myers | | |
| 94 | Republican | Richard P. Myers | | Democratic | Earl W. Godt II | | |
| 95 | Republican | Mike Fortner | Won reelection | Republican | ✓ Mike Fortner | | |
| 95 | Republican | Mike Fortner | Won reelection | Democratic | Maria Owens | | |
| 96 | Republican | Darlene Senger | Won reelection | Republican | ✓ Darlene Senger | | |
| 96 | Republican | Darlene Senger | Won reelection | Democratic | Dawn DeSart | | |
| 97 | Republican | Jim Watson | Won reelection | Republican | ✓ Jim Watson | | 100% |
| 98 | Democratic | Betsy Hannig | Incumbent retired. Republican pickup | Democratic | Charles Landers | | |
| 98 | Democratic | Betsy Hannig | Incumbent retired. Republican pickup | Republican | ✓ Wayne Arthur Rosenthal | | |
| 99 | Republican | Raymond Poe | Won reelection | Republican | ✓ Raymond Poe | | |
| 99 | Republican | Raymond Poe | Won reelection | Democratic | Kent E. DeLay | | |
| 100 | Republican | Rich Brauer | Won reelection | Republican | ✓ Rich Brauer | | 100% |
| 101 | Democratic | Robert F. Flider | Incumbent lost. Republican pickup | Democratic | Robert F. Flider | | |
| 101 | Democratic | Robert F. Flider | Incumbent lost. Republican pickup | Republican | ✓ Adam M. Brown | | |
| 101 | Democratic | Robert F. Flider | Incumbent lost. Republican pickup | Republican | Mark Scranton (withdrawn) | | |
| 102 | Republican | Ron Stephens | Won reelection | Republican | ✓ Ron Stephens | | |
| 102 | Republican | Ron Stephens | Won reelection | Independent | Deena Dailey | | |
| 103 | Democratic | Naomi Jakobsson | Won reelection | Democratic | ✓ Naomi Jakobsson | | |
| 103 | Democratic | Naomi Jakobsson | Won reelection | Republican | Norman E. Davis | | |
| 104 | Republican | William B. Black | Incumbent retired. | Republican | ✓ Chad Hays | | |
| 104 | Republican | William B. Black | Incumbent retired. | Democratic | Michael Puhr | | |
| 105 | Republican | Shane Cultra | Won reelection | Republican | ✓ Shane Cultra | | |
| 105 | Republican | Shane Cultra | Won reelection | Green | Vince LaMie | | |
| 106 | Republican | Keith P. Sommer | Won reelection | Republican | ✓ Keith P. Sommer | | 100% |
| 107 | Republican | John Cavaletto | Won reelection | Republican | ✓ John Cavaletto | | |
| 107 | Republican | John Cavaletto | Won reelection | Democratic | Joshua Qualls | | |
| 108 | Republican | David Reis | Won reelection | Republican | ✓ David Reis | | 100% |
| 109 | Republican | Roger L. Eddy | Won reelection | Republican | ✓ Roger L. Eddy | | |
| 109 | Republican | Roger L. Eddy | Won reelection | Democratic | Tim Cyr | | |
| 110 | Republican | Chapin Rose | Won reelection | Republican | ✓ Chapin Rose | | |
| 110 | Republican | Chapin Rose | Won reelection | Democratic | Dennis Malak | | |
| 111 | Democratic | Daniel V. Beiser | Won reelection | Democratic | ✓ Daniel V. Beiser | | 100% |
| 112 | Democratic | Jay C. Hoffman | Incumbent lost. Republican pickup | Democratic | Jay C. Hoffman | | |
| 112 | Democratic | Jay C. Hoffman | Incumbent lost. Republican pickup | Republican | ✓ Dwight Kay | | |
| 113 | Democratic | Thomas Holbrook | Won reelection | Democratic | ✓ Thomas Holbrook | | |
| 113 | Democratic | Thomas Holbrook | Won reelection | Republican | Joseph F. Avellone | | |
| 114 | Democratic | Eddie Lee Jackson | Won reelection | Democratic | ✓ Eddie Lee Jackson | | 100% |
| 115 | Republican | Mike Bost | Won reelection | Republican | ✓ Mike Bost | | |
| 115 | Republican | Mike Bost | Won reelection | Green | Charlie Howe | | |
| 116 | Democratic | Dan Reitz | | Democratic | ✓ Dan Reitz | Won reelection | |
| 116 | Democratic | Dan Reitz | | Republican | Glenn C. Farley | | |
| 117 | Democratic | John E. Bradley | Won reelection | Democratic | ✓ John E. Bradley | | 100% |
| 118 | Democratic | Brandon W. Phelps | Won reelection | Democratic | ✓ Brandon W. Phelps | | 100% |

== Notable races ==
=== District 54 ===
Long-time Republican incumbent Suzanne Bassi, a moderate, lost in the primary to conservative Tom Morrison (campaign site, PVS), co-owner of a Servpro franchise with his brother, in an upset. Morrison is facing Democratic nominee Matt Flamm (campaign site, PVS), senior partner in a business and real estate law practice in Chicago. The Pioneer Press endorsed Flamm on October 14, 2010.

The 54th District includes portions of Palatine, Barrington, Barrington Hills, Inverness, Hoffman Estates and Rolling Meadows.

- Daily Herald candidate questionnaire
- Campaign contributions at National Institute for Money in State Politics: Suzanne Bassi, Matt Flamm, Tom Morrison

== See also ==
- Illinois Senate elections, 2010
- Illinois House of Representatives
