= John Millner =

American politician

John J. Millner

Member of the Illinois Senate from the 28th District
- In office 2005–2013
- Preceded by: Kathleen Wojcik
- Succeeded by: Dan Kotowski

Member of the Illinois House of Representatives from the 55th District
- In office 2003–2005
- Preceded by: Rosemary Mulligan
- Succeeded by: Randy Ramey

Personal details
- Party: Republican
- Spouse: Debbie Millner
- Profession: Law enforcement

John J. Millner (born c. 1951) is a former Republican member of the Illinois Senate, representing the 28th district from 2005 to 2013. He previously served as Illinois State Representative for the 55th district from 2003 to 2005, and as Chief of Police of Elmhurst, Illinois from 1986 to 2003. During his tenure, he has focused on legislation related to criminal justice, due to his academic and professional backgrounds.

== Career ==
Millner served on the police force of Elmhurst, Illinois for 30 years. He then served as Chief of Police starting in 1986. During his tenure, the Elmhurst Police Department launched community policing efforts, bike and motorcycle patrols, and a gun lock giveaway program. In 2001 he served as President of the Illinois Association of Chiefs of Police, and he is also a former President of the DuPage County Chiefs of Police Association.

In 2002, Millner ran for the State Representative position from the Republican-leaning 55th District. He won the Republican party's nomination in March, defeating Randy Ramey. Later that year in August, Millner announced that he would resign from his position as Elmhurst Chief of Police. The election took place in November, with Millner defeating the Democratic candidate, Steve Bruesewitz.

Millner served as a State Representative for two years. With the retirement of State Senator Kathleen Wojcik in July 2005, local Republican leaders appointed Millner to fill the vacancy. Millner first finished Wojcik's term, then was elected to a four-year term in 2006. He was reelected to another term in 2010, defeating Democratic challenger Corinne Pierog. The Chicago Tribune endorsed Millner in the 2010 election.

Because of his background in law enforcement, Millner is known for his work on criminal justice legislation, having served as the Republican spokesperson on the Illinois Senate's criminal law committee. His contributions include an anti-stalking law and a bill that requires lead homicide investigators to undergo more interrogation training, to reduce the likelihood of false confessions. He is also known to promote bipartisan cooperation.

== Personal life ==
Millner is the President of John Millner Inc., a law enforcement training company. He earned an associate degree from Triton College, a bachelor's degree in social justice from Lewis University, and a master's degree in criminal justice administration from Western Illinois University.

Millner has two children and two grandchildren. His wife, Debbie Millner, died on May 1, 2012, after a long battle with cancer. He had announced in September 2011 that he would not seek re-election to his Senate position to spend more time with his wife.

Preceded by Kay Wojcik	Illinois State Senator 28th District; 2005 — 2013	Succeeded by Dan Kotowski
Preceded by Rosemary Mulligan	Illinois State Representative 55th district 2003 — 2005	Succeeded by Randy Ramey
