= Hannig =

Hannig is a German surname. Notable people with the surname include:

- Betsy Hannig (born 1963), American politician
- Gary Hannig (born 1952), American politician
- Horst Hannig (1921–1943), German World War II flying ace
- Nick Hannig (born 1986), German boxer
- Petr Hannig (1946–2025), Czech musician and politician
