= Ulery =

Ulery may refer to:

== People ==
- Dana Ulery (born 1938), American computer scientist
- Jordan Ulery (born 1949), American politician

== Other uses ==
- Ulery Mill, building in Pennsylvania
- Eli Ulery House, house inn Illinois
