= Wayne Rosenthal =

Wayne Rosenthal may refer to:

- Wayne Rosenthal (baseball)
- Wayne Rosenthal (politician)
