= Hervey City, Illinois =

- Unincorporated community
- Location within Illinois Location within the United States
- Coordinates: 39°45′20″N 88°51′03″W
- Country: United States
- State: Illinois
- County: Macon
- Elevation: 699 ft (213 m)
- Time zone: UTC-6 (Central (CST))
  - Summer (DST): UTC-5 (CDT)
- Area code: 217
- GNIS feature ID: 410115

Hervey City is an unincorporated community in Mount Zion Township, Macon County, Illinois, United States. The community is on Illinois Route 121 1.7 miles (2.7 km) southeast of Mount Zion.
