= Fort Daniel Conservation Area =

- Location within Illinois
- Location: Macon County, Illinois, United States
- Nearest city: Decatur
- Coordinates: 39°46′54.12″N 88°49′41.88″W
- Area: 611 acres (247 ha)

Fort Daniel Conservation Area is a 611-acre (2.47 km^{2}) park located four miles (6.5 km) east of Mount Zion, Illinois. The land preserve protects the site of the ghost town, Whistleville. Today, the site centers on hiking and picnicking in the Big Creek watershed southeast of Decatur. Seven marked trails comprise 5.1 miles (7.0 km) of hiking opportunities that cross and recross Big Creek. At the north end of the conservation area, a recreational complex includes a picnic shelter, playground, and fire ring. Tree watchers are encouraged to find and identify the sugar maples, chinquapin oaks, pawpaws, wafer ashes, and Kentucky coffeetrees that grow in the area.

The park is maintained by the Macon County Conservation District (MCCD). In 2019, the Illinois Clean Energy Community Foundation awarded a $1 million grant to the MCCD to enable a 173-acre land acquisition adjacent to the existing conservation area. In 2022, the foundation awarded an additional $2.9 million grant to enable a 235-acre land acquisition. The nearest major highway is Illinois Route 121, located southeast of Decatur.

== Eli Ulery House - Woodbine Farm ==
In June 2023, the MCCD acquired the five-acre parcel containing the Eli Ulery House, also known as Woodbine Farm. This site is listed on the National Register of Historic Places.

== 2025 Pothole Prairie and Seasonal Wetland Creation ==
The MCCD applied for and was awarded an Open Space Land Acquisition & Development grant (OS-24-2517) by the Illinois Department of Natural Resources (IDNR) in 2024 in the amount of $600,000. This project involves converting old farmland, acquired by the district in 2023, into a unique pothole prairie ecosystem. A pothole prairie is a habitat characterized by many small, shallow wetlands surrounded by prairie. The district plans to add new trails and access points as well as educational and interpretive signage in this area.

== Whistleville ==
Although the upper Big Creek watershed is open space now, it was one of the first areas settled by Euro-Americans in the 1820s in what became Macon County. Looking for timber and firewood on the unforested prairie, the settlers found mature oaks and hickories here. The first arrivals named their pioneer village Whistleville. Soon, a stagecoach route made the settlement a port of call between Indiana and Central Illinois. Early settlers were mostly from the American South, and the settlement was identified as a location of Southern sympathizers during the American Civil War. After the Civil War, Whistleville dwindled and disappeared, becoming a ghost town.
