= Karpiel =

Karpiel is a Polish-language surname literally meaning "rutabaga". Notable people with the surname include:

- Doris Karpiel (born 1935), American businesswoman
- Józef Karpiel (1932–1994), Polish skier
- Kamila Karpiel (born 2001), Polish ski jumper
- Stanisław Karpiel (1909–1992), Polish cross-country skier
