= Julie Curry =

American politician

Julie A. Curry (born June 7, 1962) was an American politician.

Born in Granite City, Illinois, Curry received her bachelor's and master's degree from Eastern Illinois University in political science. From 1990 to 1994, Curry served as treasurer for Macon County, Illinois and was a Democrat. From 1995 to 2003, she served in the Illinois House of Representatives.

On January 16, 2003, Curry resigned from the Illinois House to take a position in the administration of Governor Rod Blagojevich. Two days later, the Democratic Representative Committee for the 101 Representative District appointed Robert Flider, the Mayor of Mount Zion, to the vacancy created by the resignation. Flider was sworn into office the same day.
