= Robert Flider =

American politician

Bob Flider
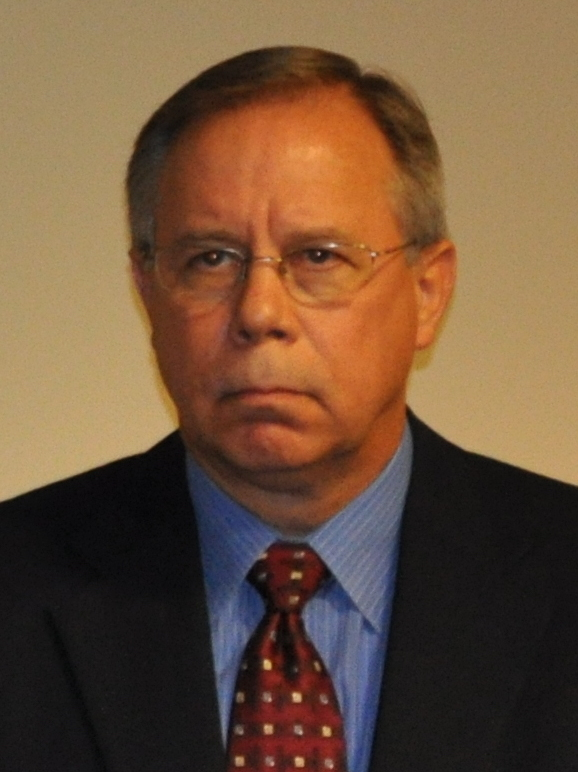
- Flider in 2012

Illinois Director of Agriculture
- In office February 15, 2012 – January 12, 2015
- Governor: Pat Quinn
- Preceded by: Thomas F. Jennings
- Succeeded by: Phil Nelson

Member of the Illinois House of Representatives from the 101st district
- In office January 18, 2003 – January 12, 2011
- Preceded by: Julie Curry
- Succeeded by: Adam Brown

Mayor of Mount Zion
- In office April 1995 – April 2003
- Preceded by: Harry Ashworth
- Succeeded by: Donald R. Robinson

Village Trustee of Mount Zion
- In office April 1991 – April 1995

Personal details
- Born: October 22, 1957 (age 68) Chicago, Illinois
- Party: Democratic
- Spouse: Jean
- Children: 3
- Education: Eastern Illinois University (BA)

Robert Frank Flider (born October 22, 1957) is an American politician and lobbyist from Illinois. A member of the Democratic Party, he served as the Director of the Illinois Department of Agriculture under Governor Pat Quinn from 2012 until 2015. He served as Mayor of Mount Zion, Illinois from 1995 until 2003 and represented the 101st district in the Illinois House of Representatives, then-covering a section of Central Illinois including Decatur and all or parts of Macon, Moultrie and Shelby counties, from 2003 to 2008. He currently serves as the Senior Director of Community and Government Relations for the University of Illinois.

== Early life ==
Robert Frank Flider was born October 22, 1957, in Chicago, Illinois. He attended Bogan High School in Chicago from 1971 to 1973. His family moved to Mattoon, Illinois in 1973, and he graduated from Mattoon High School in 1975. While attending Matton High School, Flider met his future wife Jean.

Following his high school graduation, Flider attended the nearby Eastern Illinois University, where he graduated in 1979 with a Bachelor of Arts degree in journalism. From 1980 to 1983, Flider worked as a newspaper reporter for the Times Courier-Journal Gazette in the Charleston–Mattoon region.

In 1983, Flider began a two-decade career as a lobbyist in the energy industry, first as a legislative analyst for the Central Illinois Public Service Company, then as the Director of Regulatory and Government Affairs for Illinois Power. Flider would work for Illinois Power from 1987 to 2003, the same year as his appointment to the Illinois House of Representatives. During his time with Illinois Power, Flider served as the project manager for a legislative initiative focused on increasing electric generation competitiveness and lowering Illinois utility rates.

== Municipal career ==
In 1991, Flider was elected to the Mount Zion Village Board. In 1995, after one term on the board, Flider was elected Mayor, succeeding Harry Ashworth.

During his two terms as mayor, Flider lowered water rates for most residents, obtained millions in state funding for infrastructure and recreation improvements, developed a community-wide planning initiative called "Mt. Zion 2000," and instituted a comprehensive plan which led to the construction of Goodwin Park, new "quality subdivisions," and new sidewalks, roads, and bike paths. Mayor Flider was also active as a board member for the Economic Development Corporation of Decatur and Macon County, the Downtown Decatur Council, the Decatur Rotary Club, the United Way of Decatur and Macon County, and the "Seniorama Committee."

Simultaneous to his time as mayor, Flider attended the Harvard Law School Program on Negotiation in 1997 and earned a Certificate of Business Administration from the University of Illinois Urbana-Champaign in 1999. He was succeeded as mayor by Donald R. Robinson.

== Illinois House of Representatives ==
On January 16, 2003, Democratic state representative Julie Curry resigned her seat to take a position in the administration of Governor Rod Blagojevich. Two days later, the Democratic Representative Committee for the 101st Representative District of Illinois appointed Flider to the vacancy created by the resignation. Flider was sworn into office the same day. The 101st district to which Flider was appointed was at that time was anchored by the City of Decatur and included all or parts of Macon, Moultrie, and Shelby counties in Central Illinois.

In 2004, Flider won election to the House in his own right, defeating radio personality and Republican nominee Scot England of Sullivan, Illinois by a margin of 53% to 46%. He was reelected by a slightly wider margin against Dick Cain in 2006 and ran unopposed in 2008.

During his tenure in the Illinois House of Representatives, Flider's committee assignments included Agriculture & Conservation, Elections & Campaign Reform, Elementary & Secondary Education, Environment & Energy, Ethanol Production Oversight, Veterans Affairs, Local Government, and Renewable Energy. He served as the Vice Chairman for the latter two committees. He also served as the chairman for two committees; Least Cost Power Procurement and Electric Generation & Commerce.

Flider was the primary sponsor behind numerous bills that became law. These included a law that extended penalties for driving under the influence to persons driving under the influence of methamphetamine, a law that insured members of the public were able to comment at meetings of the Illinois Commerce Commission, and a law that prevented gas and utility services from cutting off an individual’s service if the forecast was to be below freezing in an upcoming period.

In 2010, Flider lost re-election by 599 votes to Decatur City Council member Adam Brown. Two months after the end of his final term, Flider was employed by Partnership for a Connected Illinois as the Director for Broadband Impact.

== Director of the Illinois Department of Agriculture ==
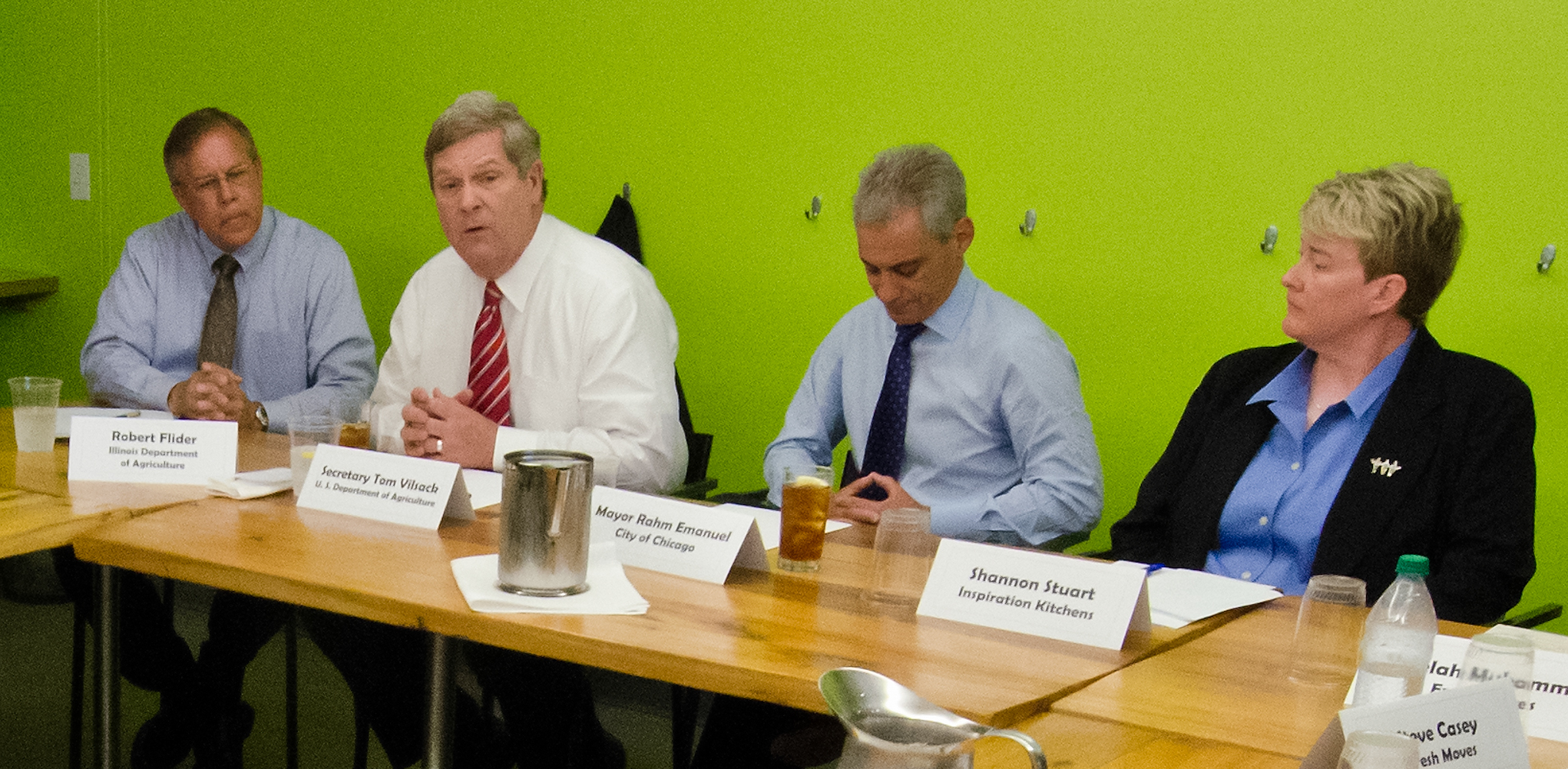
Flider at a Chicago round table with United States Secretary of Agriculture Tom Vilsack and Mayor of Chicago Rahm Emanuel on June 8, 2012

On February 15, 2012, Governor Pat Quinn named Flider as the Director of the Illinois Department of Agriculture to succeed Thomas F. Jennings. Flider served as acting director until he was confirmed by the Illinois Senate in a 33–16 vote. Upon appointment, Flider set three goals for the department: achieve Governor Quinn's goal of doubling Illinois exports by 2014, maximize every opportunity to strengthen rural development in Illinois, and partner with the agriculture community in ongoing efforts to ensure Illinoisans' food is safe.

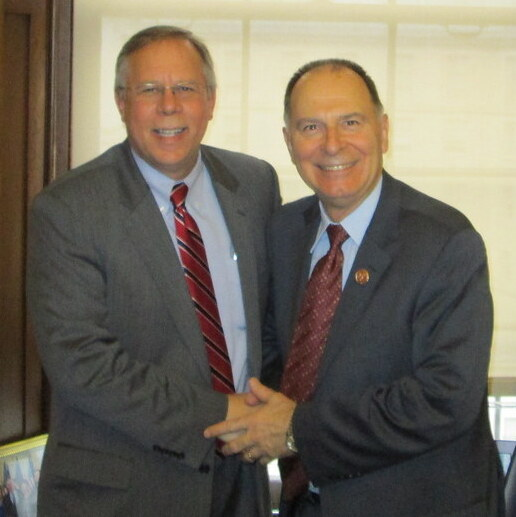
Flider with U.S. Congressman William Enyart on February 5, 2014

Flider's appointment was met with some media criticism as a result of the end of his tenure in the Illinois State House. During the 2010 election campaign, Flider had campaigned against an increase in the Illinois income tax that was supported by Governor Quinn. However during the January 2011 lame duck session, after losing reelection, Flider voted in favor of increasing the Illinois income tax rate from 3% to 5%. Flider denied any connection between his change in opinion on the income tax and his appointment over a year later, saying "the governor and I have never had a conversation relative to my vote for a tax increase, he never asked me to vote for a tax increase. I never told him I was going to vote for a tax increase, and he certainly never even brought it up during the discussion that we had about [the directorship of the Illinois Department of Agriculture.” In contrast, Flider's appointment also received some bipartisan praise from former Illinois State Senator Duane Noland, a Republican, who said to the State Journal Register of Springfield, Illinois "Bob has lived most of his life in the rural area, obviously representing a rural district as a state legislator, so he’s familiar with issues important to farmers... A strength is he will be knowledgeable with government, he’s been in public service for a long time. He knows his way around the Capitol as well as the rural areas, so he should be effective.”

Flider would later receive further praise from Republicans during his tenure, including from former State Representative Jim Sacia, who wrote an opinion piece in defense of Flider in 2014 where he asked the people of Illinois to "put politics behind us and recognize a good leader of agriculture for his competence, not his political affiliation."

Flider left office in January 2015, following the election of Republican Governor Bruce Rauner and was succeeded by Phil Nelson. Shortly after his departure, Flider returned to working as a lobbyist.

== Later career ==
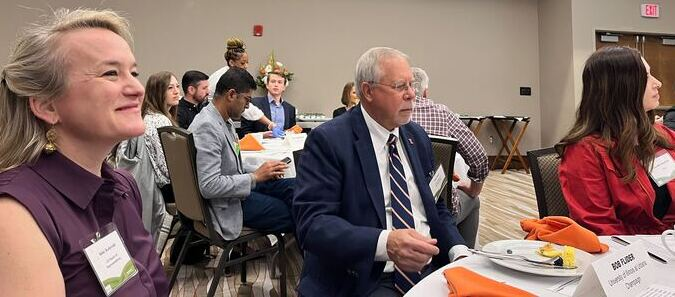
Flider with U.S. Congresswoman Nikki Budzinski in 2023

Beginning on April 23, 2018, Flider served as the inaugural Director of Community and Government Relations for the Office of the Chancellor of the University of Illinois Urbana-Champaign. Upon his appointment, University of Illinois Chancellor Robert Jones said Flider "brings to the job a proven record of building relationships with leaders from a wide array of perspectives" and added that he believed Flider "will be a strong advocate for the campus vision and the mission of our land-grant university." Flider was promoted to Senior Director in 2024.

In 2023, Flider was reported to have donated 1,100 USD to the congressional campaign of U.S. Representative Nikki Budzinski, a fellow Democrat.

As of 2024, Flider served on the United Way of Illinois Board of Directors.

During the COVID-19 pandemic, Flider was said to be "instrumental" in helping Eastern Illinois University obtain SHEILD testing, a saliva-based COVID-19 test pioneered by the University of Illinois System. Thanks in part to this effort, Flider received an honorary Doctorate in Public Service from Eastern Illinois University in 2025.

== Electoral history ==
=== Illinois House of Representatives ===
2004

2004 Illinois House of Representatives 101st district Democratic primary
Party	Candidate	Votes	%
Democratic	Robert "Bob" Flider	7,787	100

2004 Illinois House of Representatives 101st district election
Party	Candidate	Votes	%
Democratic	Robert "Bob" Flider	23,292	53.06
Republican	Scot England	20,606	46.94

2006 (Note: Flider was listed by his nickname, "Bob," on both primary and general election ballots starting in 2006 and continuing for the remainder of his electoral career.)

2006 Illinois House of Representatives 101st district Democratic primary
Party	Candidate	Votes	%
Democratic	Bob Flider	3,171	100

2006 Illinois House of Representatives 101st district election
Party	Candidate	Votes	%
Democratic	Bob Flider	16,489	54.54
Republican	Dick Cain	13,746	45.46

2008

2008 Illinois House of Representatives 101st district Democratic primary
Party	Candidate	Votes	%
Democratic	Bob Flider	12,002	100

2008 Illinois House of Representatives 101st district election
Party	Candidate	Votes	%
Democratic	Bob Flider	37,367	100

2010

2010 Illinois House of Representatives 101st district Democratic primary
Party	Candidate	Votes	%
Democratic	Bob Flider	4,644	100

2010 Illinois House of Representatives 101st district election
Party	Candidate	Votes	%
Republican	Adam M. Brown	15,939	50.96
Democratic	Bob Flider	15,340	49.04
