= Michelle Mussman =

American politician (born 1972)

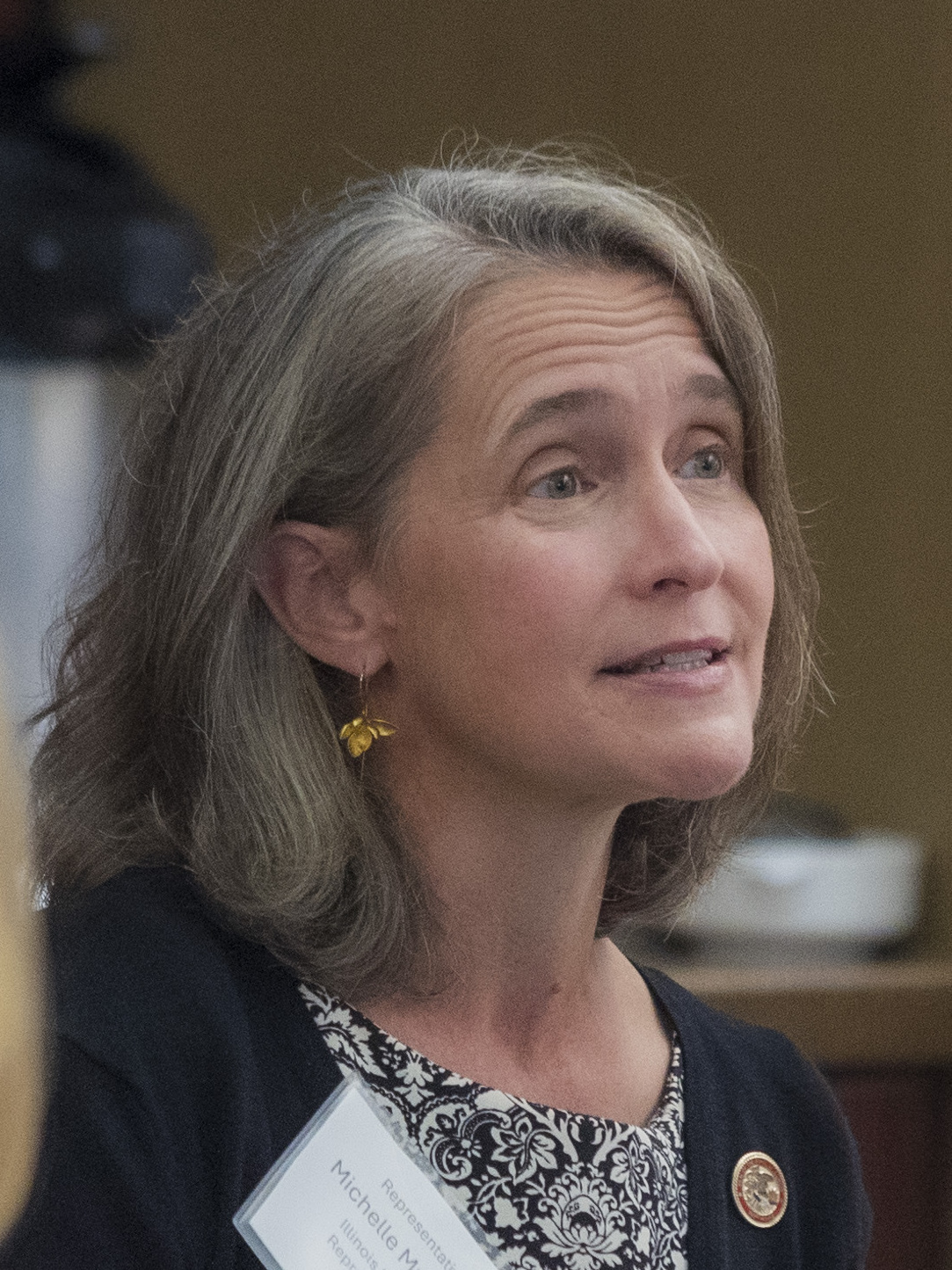
- Mussman in 2025

Member of the Illinois House of Representatives from the 56th district
- Incumbent
- Assumed office January 2011
- Preceded by: Paul Froehlich

Personal details
- Born: August 17, 1972 (age 54) Aberdeen Proving Ground
- Party: Democratic
- Children: 3
- Education: University of Cincinnati
- Occupation: Illinois State Representative
- Profession: Graphic Designer
- Committees: Elementary & Secondary Education: School Curriculum & Policies (Chairperson); Adoption & Child Welfare; Appropriations-Human Services; Energy & Environment; Mental Health & Addiction (Vice-Chairperson); Child Care Access & Early Childhood; Housing; Special Issues Subcommittee
- Website: Illinois General Assembly

Michelle Mussman (born August 17, 1972) is the Illinois State Representative from the 56th district. She has held the position since 2011. The 56th district includes all or parts of Schaumburg, Elk Grove Village, Roselle, Hoffman Estates, Hanover Park, Rolling Meadows and Bloomingdale.

== Electoral career ==
In 2010, Mussman was elected to the Illinois General Assembly as the Representative from the 56th district. She was reelected in 2012, 2014, 2016, 2018, and 2020.

== Illinois House of Representatives ==
=== Committees ===
Mussman currently serves on seven committees and one subcommittee: the Elementary & Secondary Education: School Curriculum & Policies committee (Chairperson), the Adoption & Child Welfare committee, the Appropriations-Human Services committee, the Energy & Environment committee, the Mental Health & Addiction committee (Vice-Chairperson), the Child Care Access & Early Childhood committee, the Housing Committee, and the Special Issues Subcommittee.

=== Legislation ===
During her tenure as State Representative, Mussman has introduced several bills that have gone on to become law in Illinois. This includes HB0135, which requires health insurers to extend coverage to birth control prescribed by pharmacists, as well as HB0452, which requires the Illinois Department of Human Services to "prescribe and supervise" the implementation of vocational rehabilitation programs for people with disabilities as needed.

== Personal life ==
Mussman attended Purcell Marian High School in Cincinnati, OH, graduating in 1990 before attending the University of Cincinnati College of Design, Architecture, Art, and Planning where she received her Bachelor of Science degree in Graphic Design. Prior to being elected as State Representative, Michelle served as president and treasurer of her local Parent Teacher Association and as a member of the Schaumburg Township Council of Parent Teacher Associations. In the 2016 United States presidential election, Mussman served as a presidential elector for Illinois.

Mussman is married to her husband, George, and has three sons.

== Electoral history ==
Illinois 56th Representative District General Primary, 2010
Party	Candidate	Votes	%
Democratic	Michelle Mussman	4,256	100

Illinois 56th Representative District General Election, 2010
Party	Candidate	Votes	%
Democratic	Michelle Mussman	14,425	51.17
Republican	Ryan Higgins	13,767	48.83
Total votes		28,192	100.0

Illinois 56th Representative District General Election, 2012
Party	Candidate	Votes	%
Democratic	Michelle Mussman (incumbent)	24,138	59.89
Republican	John R. Lawson	16,164	40.11
Total votes		40,302	100.0

Illinois 56th Representative District General Election, 2014
Party	Candidate	Votes	%
Democratic	Michelle Mussman (incumbent)	14,405	51.45
Republican	Jim Moynihan	13,592	48.55
Total votes		27,997	100.0

Illinois 56th Representative District General Election, 2016
Party	Candidate	Votes	%
Democratic	Michelle Mussman (incumbent)	24,890	55.83
Republican	Jillian Rose Bernas	19,693	44.17
Total votes		44,583	100.0

Illinois 56th Representative District General Election, 2018
Party	Candidate	Votes	%
Democratic	Michelle Mussman (incumbent)	21,352	58.86
Republican	Jillian Rose Bernas	14,923	41.14
Total votes		36,275	100.0

Illinois 56th Representative District General Election, 2020
Party	Candidate	Votes	%
Democratic	Michelle Mussman (incumbent)	28,821	57.59
Republican	Scott Kegarise	21,222	42.41
Total votes		50,043	100.0

== See also ==
- Illinois House of Representatives elections, 2010
