= Brian W. Stewart =

American politician

Brian Stewart

Member of the Illinois Senate from the 45th district
- In office December 5, 2018 – January 9, 2023
- Preceded by: Tim Bivins
- Succeeded by: Andrew Chesney

Member of the Illinois House of Representatives from the 89th district
- In office October 4, 2013 – December 5, 2018
- Preceded by: Jim Sacia
- Succeeded by: Andrew Chesney

Personal details
- Born: October 25, 1957 (age 68) Freeport, Illinois, U.S.
- Party: Republican
- Profession: Business Owner; Sheriff's Deputy (retired)

Military service
- Allegiance: United States
- Branch/service: United States Army

Brian W. Stewart (born October 25, 1957) was a Republican member of the Illinois Senate representing the 45th District since his election in 2018. The 45th District encompasses all of Stephenson, Jo Daviess, and Ogle counties as well as portions of Winnebago, DeKalb, LaSalle, Lee, Whiteside, and Carroll. He also served as a member of the Illinois House of Representatives, representing the 89th District from his appointment in 2013 to 2018. Stewart announced in January 2022 that he would not be seeking re-election to the Illinois Senate.

== Early life, education, and career ==
Stewart is a native of Freeport, IL. He attended Freeport High School, Stewart enlisted in the United States Army. He served on Active Duty as a Military Policeman and as a Military Police Investigator and was Honorably Discharged. He then was hired as a Deputy Sheriff with the Stephenson County Sheriff's Police.

Stewart began the first of his small businesses in 1987 on his kitchen table. Today, he owns several businesses and is a major employer in Northwest Illinois. Of the businesses he owns, Stewart & Associates Inc. is the primary. Stewart & Associates Inc. has various branches, and provides a multitude of services — such as security, private investigations, background investigations, civil processing, and more.

As the Chairman of the Stephenson County Republican Party, he supported the presidential campaign of former New York City Mayor Rudy Giuliani during the 2008 Republican Party presidential primaries.

== Illinois House of Representatives ==
Jim Sacia announced that he would be stepping down from the Illinois House of Representatives in September 2013. Brian W. Stewart was appointed to replace Jim Sacia by the Republican Central Committee. Stewart was sworn in at a public gathering at the Stephenson County Courthouse on October 4, 2013.

== Illinois Senate ==
Stewart was elected to succeed retiring Senator Tim Bivins. He was sworn in early on December 5, 2018, to represent the 45th District, which encompasses all of Stephenson, Jo Daviess, and Ogle counties as well as portions of Winnebago, DeKalb, LaSalle, Lee, Whiteside, and Carroll.

=== Committees ===
- Pensions (Minority Spokesperson); Agriculture; Energy and Public Utilities; Financial Institutions; Healthcare Access and Availability; Judiciary; Veterans Affairs; Appropriations; App-Constitutional Offices (Sub-Minority Spokesperson); App- General Services (Sub-Minority Spokesperson); App-Human Services; App-Judiciary (Sub-Minority Spokesperson); Judiciary- Torts; Redistricting- Northern Illinois.
