= Justin Cochran =

American politician

Member of the Illinois House of Representatives from the 55th district
- Incumbent
- Assumed office December 30, 2025
- Preceded by: Marty Moylan

Personal details
- Party: Democratic

Justin Cochran is an American politician serving as a Democratic member of the Illinois House of Representatives for the 55th district. He was appointed to the office on December 30, 2025, after Marty Moylan resigned. Cochran was previously Moylan's chief of staff.
