= Harry R. Ramey Jr. =

American politician

Wayne Township Supervisor
- Incumbent
- Assumed office May 2017
- Preceded by: Tom Arends

Member of the Illinois House of Representatives from the 55th district
- In office August 2005 – January 2013
- Preceded by: John J. Millner
- Succeeded by: Marty Moylan (redistricted)

Personal details
- Born: March 17, 1962 (age 64) Springfield, Illinois
- Party: Republican

Harry "Randy" Ramey Jr. (born March 17, 1962) is a former Republican member of the Illinois House of Representatives representing the 55th district from 2005 to 2012. Ramey ran for the 55th district in 2002, but was defeated in the Republican primary by John J. Millner. Ramey was appointed in 2005 and was elected in 2006, with 39% of the vote. Ramey is the stepson of Republican James "Pate" Philip.

As a member of the Illinois House of Representatives, Ramey served on five committees: Transportation and Motor Vehicles, Consumer Protection, Appropriation-Public Safety, Computer Technology, and State Government Administration.

In March 2012, Ramey ran in the Republican primary for the Illinois State Senate in the 23rd District. He was defeated by Carole Pankau. During the campaign, dashcam video surfaced of Ramey being arrested by Carol Stream police for a DUI in August 2011, in which Ramey could be heard saying "do you know who I am?"
