= Pullen v. Mulligan =

Illinois Supreme Court case

- Seal of the Supreme Court of Illinois
- Court: Supreme Court of Illinois
- Full case name: Penny Pullen, Appellant and Cross-Appellee, v. Rosemary Mulligan, Appellee and Cross-Appellant
- Decided: September 21, 1990
- Citation: 561 N.E.2d 585 (1990)

Case opinions
- Decision by: J. Ward

Pullen v. Mulligan, 561 N.E.2d 585 (Ill. 1990), was an Illinois Supreme Court case concerning a March 1990 election recount. At one point decided by a coin toss, the race and recount gained national attention over the issue of abortion. The case was later cited by Vice President Al Gore's legal team during the 2000 Florida recount as precedent for counting "dimpled chads."

== Background ==
Penny Pullen was the leader of the anti-abortion movement in Illinois and assistant minority leader in the Illinois House of Representatives. Following the United States Supreme Court's ruling upholding a Missouri abortion statute in Webster v. Reproductive Health Services, Pullen proposed similar laws in Illinois. Rosemary Mulligan, a paralegal and local abortion rights activist, decided to challenge her in the March 1990 Republican primary. The race gained national attention as anti-abortion and abortion rights groups contributed heavily to both candidates.

On March 20, 1990, Mulligan defeated Pullen by 31 votes on election night. Pullen filed for a recount which took place that summer and eventually resulted in a tie. The lower court ordered a coin toss, which Mulligan won. Pullen then appealed to the Illinois Supreme Court which instructed the lower court to determine which disputed ballots would be counted based on the intent of the voter rather than the results determined by the voting machines. On September 21, 1990, the Illinois Supreme Court ruled that Pullen had won by 6 votes.
