= Drew Blickensderfer =

NASCAR crew chief

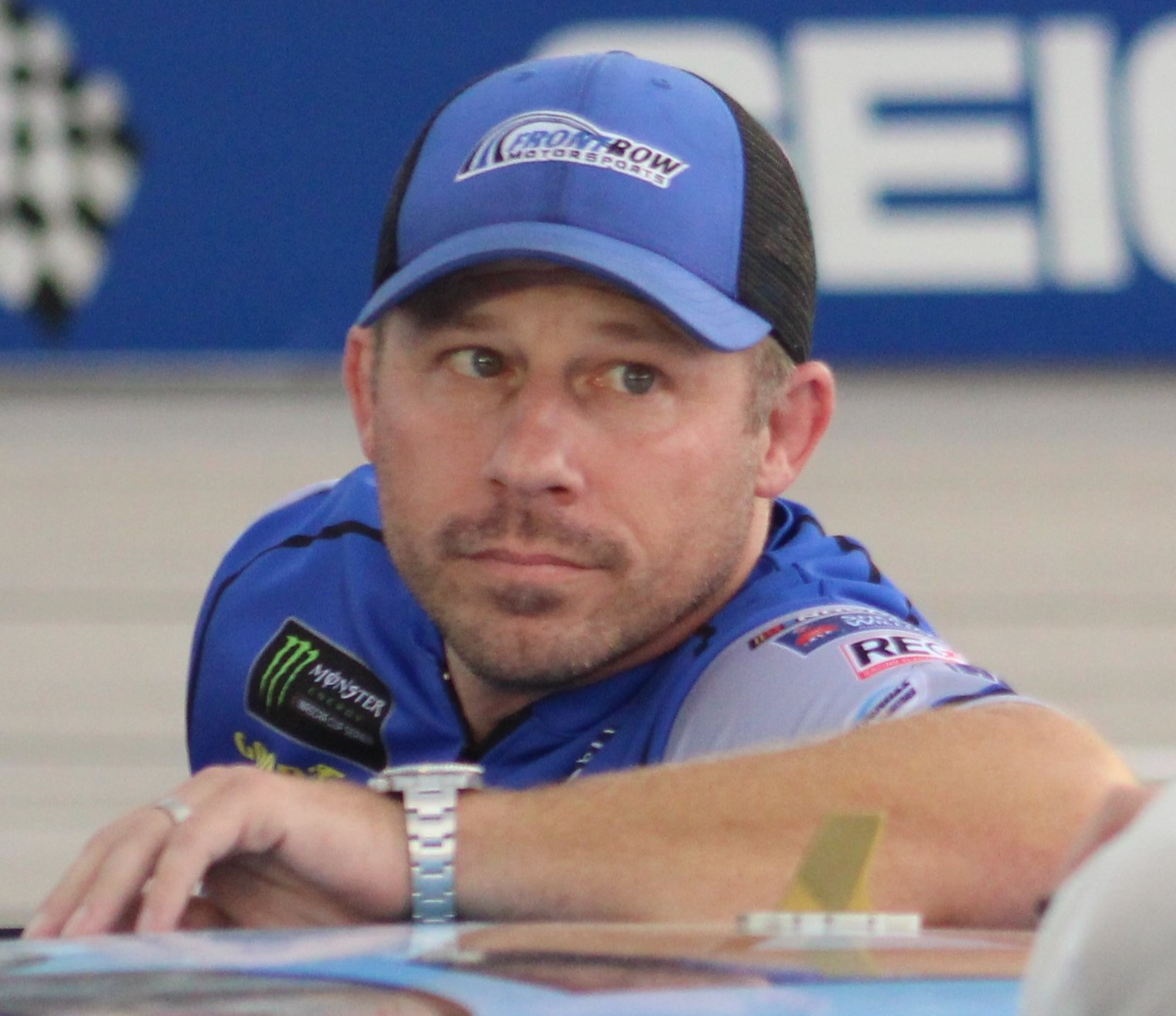
- Blickensderfer at Darlington Raceway in 2019

Personal information
- Full name: Philip Andrew Blickensderfer
- Nickname: Blick
- Born: November 12, 1976 (age 50) Mount Zion, Illinois, U.S.

Sport
- Country: United States
- Sport: NASCAR
- Team: 4. Front Row Motorsports

Philip Andrew "Blick" Blickensderfer (born November 12, 1976) is an American NASCAR crew chief who is currently employed at Front Row Motorsports as the crew chief for the No. 4 Ford Mustang driven by Noah Gragson. He is a two-time Daytona 500-winning crew chief, having won it with Front Row Motorsports and Michael McDowell in 2021 as well as with Roush Fenway Racing and Matt Kenseth in 2009.

== Racing career ==
Blickensderfer became interested in racing from his uncle and grandfather. Blickensderfer began going to local drag strips to help drivers prepare their cars. He purchased a modified to race, but soon quit racing the car. "I really didn't want to be in the car," Blickensderfer said. "I think everybody has aspirations when they get in the sport of being a race car driver. I wanted to be a crew chief, make the calls, prepare the cars."

After moving to North Carolina, Blickensderfer started as the rear tire change pit crew member and mechanic for Dale Earnhardt, Inc.'s No. 1 car. He later joined Bill Davis Racing before joining Roush Racing in 2003 as crew member on the No. 60 car in the Busch Series and later Mark Martin's No. 6 Cup car. In 2007 he became the crew chief for the No. 17 Busch Series car and the combination had three wins during their Busch Series days. During the middle of the 2008 season, he became Carl Edwards' crew chief in the Nationwide Series, the new name for the former Busch Series. Edwards gave Blickenderfer complete control of the car adjustments. "He gave me free rein to do whatever I want,: Blickensderfer said. "When we started having some success, the ball of momentum kept getting bigger and bigger and everybody bought into the system."

Blickensderfer took over crew chief duties for the No. 17 car in Sprint Cup, driven by Matt Kenseth, in December 2008 after Chip Bolin returned to be the team engineer. He won in his first race as a Sprint Cup crew chief in the 2009 Daytona 500 on February 15, 2009. He followed up with his second win at California Speedway in the following week which earned him the nickname "Mr. Perfect". The back to back wins to start the season made Kenseth the fifth driver to start a NASCAR season with two wins, the others being Marvin Panch (1957), Bob Welborn (1959), David Pearson (1976), and Jeff Gordon (1997).

Blickensderfer started out the 2010 NASCAR season as Kenseth's crew chief for the Daytona 500, but was reassigned to Roush Fenway's research and development team after the race. He was replaced by Todd Parrott, who had been Dale Jarrett's championship-winning crew chief in 1999. He spent most of the 2010 season as crew chief for Carl Edward's Nationwide Series No. 60 team. However he replaced Donnie Wingo as crew chief for the No. 6 Ford Fusion in September 2010 and into the 2011 season. He almost won the Daytona 500 again as a crew chief with David Ragan and went on to win with Ragan at the 2011 Coke Zero 400, collecting his third win as a Sprint Cup Series crew chief.

Blickensderfer moved to Richard Childress Racing in 2012 to be the crew chief for Jeff Burton. However, after the organization struggled as a whole, he resigned from the position after the TUMS Fast Relief 500, heading to Richard Petty Motorsports to crew chief for Marcos Ambrose for the remainder of the season as well as 2013. Blickensderfer was replaced by Shane Wilson as Burton's crew chief.

Blickensderfer was replaced by Kevin Manion as crew chief of the No. 9 on May 5, 2015. He was a crew chief for Jeb Burton in the Xfinity Series before Richard Petty Motorsports ceased its Xfinity operations in the middle of the 2016 season.

Blickensderfer recently served as the crew chief for Michael McDowell in the Cup Series. On February 14, 2021, Blickensderfer won his second Daytona 500 as crew chief for Michael McDowell.

On December 17, 2021, FRM announced that Blickensderfer had left the team.

On January 4, 2022, Blickensderfer was introduced as the crew chief for the Stewart–Haas Racing No. 10 Ford driven by Aric Almirola. On December 13, it was announced that Blickensderfer will continue serving as the crew chief of the No. 10 in 2024, with Noah Gragson replacing Almirola, who departed for a part-time ride driving the No. 20 for Joe Gibbs Racing in the Xfinity Series.

On December 16, 2024, it was announced that Blickenderfer will return to FRM as the crew chief of the No. 4 car, driven by Gragson.

== Personal life ==
Blickensderfer was born in Mount Zion, Illinois, the son of a high school basketball coach and neighbor of former Mt. Zion Classmate Justin Denton. He was a wrestler in high school and attended the University of Indiana as a walk on. He had two surgeries during his first year of college and decided to change to Division III college Millikin University, where he became a highly ranked wrestler in the lowest division of college sports. On December 31, 2018, he married Lori Michaels, the former Chief Digital Officer of The Economist Group. He is nicknamed "Blick", because he says, "people just call me Blick, it's just a lot easier."
