= Brad Halbrook =

American politician

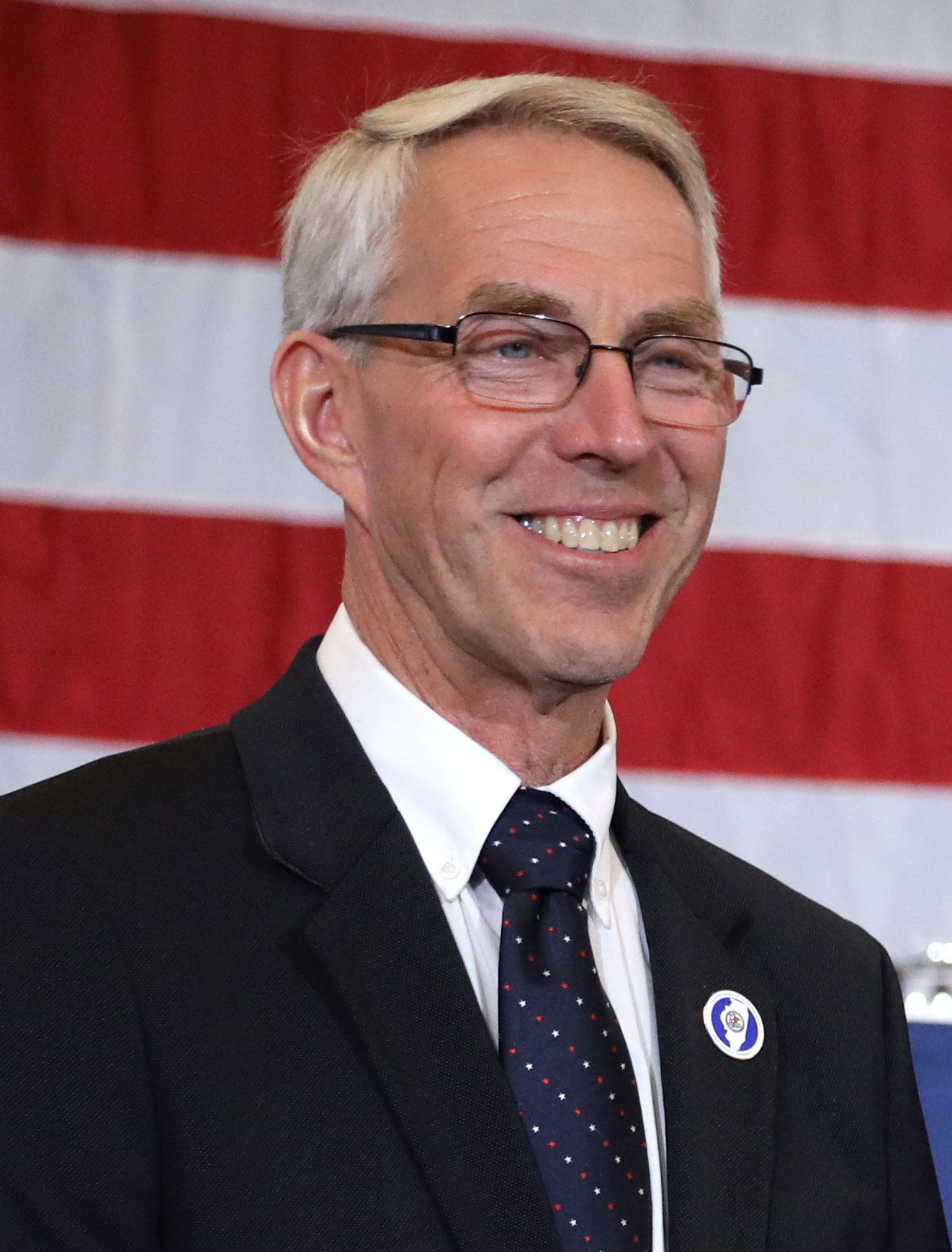

Member of the Illinois House of Representatives from the 102nd district
- Incumbent
- Assumed office January 2017
- Preceded by: Adam Brown

Member of the Illinois House of Representatives from the 110th district
- In office April 2012 – January 2015
- Preceded by: Roger L. Eddy
- Succeeded by: Reginald H. Phillips

Personal details
- Born: July 22, 1961 (age 65) Pana, Illinois, U.S.
- Party: Republican
- Spouse: Linda
- Children: 2
- Education: Lake Land College
- Profession: Business owner

Brad Halbrook is a Republican member of the Illinois General Assembly. He was a small business owner who ran a company making fences before joining the general assembly. In April 2012, Halbrook was appointed to the state legislature to fill out the term of retiring state legislator Roger L. Eddy. He did not run for re-election in 2014 and was succeeded by Reggie Phillips, and he returned to the Illinois House after the 2016 elections.

== Career ==
Halbrook is both socially and fiscally conservative. He supports lowering taxes and increasing the number of Illinois jobs. According to his campaign website, “In 2012, he became just the 10th State Legislator to turn down the underfunded and overly generous General Assembly Retirement System pension.” He was among a group of legislators that started a trend; as of October 2016, 33 legislators turn down the pension.

During his campaign, Halbrook advocated for lower taxes. In the past, he has spoken out against local and state tax increases. He supports property tax caps and opposes income tax increases.

Because of the number of people and jobs that have left Illinois, Halbrook says that he is committed to reforming worker's compensation laws by eliminating unnecessary regulations.

Halbrook opposes abortion, same-sex marriage, and gun control.

Halbrook was one of five Illinois representatives to vote against the Illinois Right to Vote Amendment on its passage in the Illinois House of Representatives. The bill subsequently was passed unanimously in the Illinois Senate, and was approved as a constitutional amendment by the voters of Illinois.

During his time as a state legislator, he voted in favor of bills to provide transparency for local governments. He supports redistricting reform and imposing term limits on state legislators.

Halbrook was the fifth legislator to not accept the General Assembly pension benefit for himself. He has said that he work to reform the state pension system.

In February 2021, Halbrook introduced a measure calling for Chicago to become its own state. The measure received no co-sponsors in the state House.

As of July 3, 2022, Representative Halbrook is a member of the following Illinois House committees:

- Appropriations - General Service Committee (HAPG)
- Cities & Villages Committee (HCIV)
- Counties & Townships Committee (HCOT)
- Housing Committee (SHOU)

== 2016 election ==
In the primary election held on March 15, 2016, Halbrook defeated James Acklin and Randy Peterson. Republican incumbent Adam Brown did not seek re-election. Halbrook ran unopposed in the general election on November 8, 2016.

Republican Governor Bruce Rauner endorsed Halbrook and, in addition to several independent groups, spent money in support of his campaign. Halbrook was also endorsed by the Illinois Chamber of Commerce PAC.

== Personal life ==
Brad Halbrook owns and operates a small farm with his wife Linda in Shelbyville. They have two children.
