= Adam Brown (Illinois politician) =

American politician

Member of the Illinois House of Representatives from the 102nd district 101st District (2011-2013)
- In office January 2011 – January 2017
- Preceded by: Robert Flider (101st)
- Succeeded by: Brad Halbrook (102nd)

Personal details
- Born: August 14, 1985 (age 41)
- Party: Republican
- Education: University of Illinois

Adam Brown (born 1985) is a former Republican member of the Illinois House of Representatives, representing at different times the 101st and 102nd district.

Brown is a graduate of the University of Illinois at Urbana–Champaign. He worked for the United States Department of Agriculture and served on the Decatur, Illinois City Council before running for the Illinois House of Representatives in 2010. He defeated incumbent Representative Robert Flider by 599 votes.

In 2011, Brown joined with State Representative Bill Mitchell of the 87th district in proposing statehood for Cook County. Mitchell said that Chicago is "dictating its views" to the rest of the state and Brown added that Chicago "overshadows" the rest of Illinois.

In September 2015, Brown announced he was retiring from the Illinois House of Representatives.
