= Matthew Bogusz =

American politician

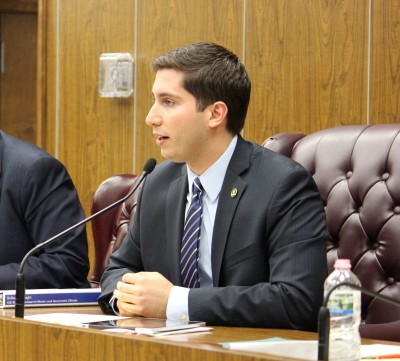
- Mayor Bogusz speaking at a Des Plaines City Council Meeting

Mayor of Des Plaines, Illinois
- In office May 6, 2013 – May 3, 2021
- Preceded by: Marty Moylan
- Succeeded by: Andrew Goczkowski

Alderman of the Des Plaines City Council from the 3rd ward
- In office May 2009 – May 2013

Personal details
- Born: November 14, 1986 (age 39) Des Plaines, Illinois, U.S.
- Spouse: Kaitlyn Pascale
- Children: 2
- Education: Northwestern University
- Occupation: Advertising Sales

Matthew Bogusz (born November 14, 1986) is an American politician who was mayor of Des Plaines, Illinois from 2013 to 2021.

In 2009, Bogusz, was elected a City of Des Plaines Alderman of the 3rd ward. While an alderman, Bogusz was variously chairman of the Des Plaines Finance and Administration Committee. He also served on the Public Works Committee and the Legal and Licensing Committee.

Bogusz was elected the mayor of the City of Des Plaines on April 9, 2013. He received 55% of the vote in a three-way race. Bogusz became the youngest mayor in Des Plaines's history. He was elected to a second term on April 4, 2017, receiving 63% of the vote.

In 2014, Des Plaines budgeted nearly $22 million in capital improvements as well as starting a "Curb Appeal Challenge" for residences and business to increase the city's quality of life. Crain's Chicago Business listed Bogusz as a member of their 2014 "Twenty in their 20s" class. Bogusz relocated out of Des Plaines following the end of his term as mayor.
