= Penny Pullen =

American politician and activist

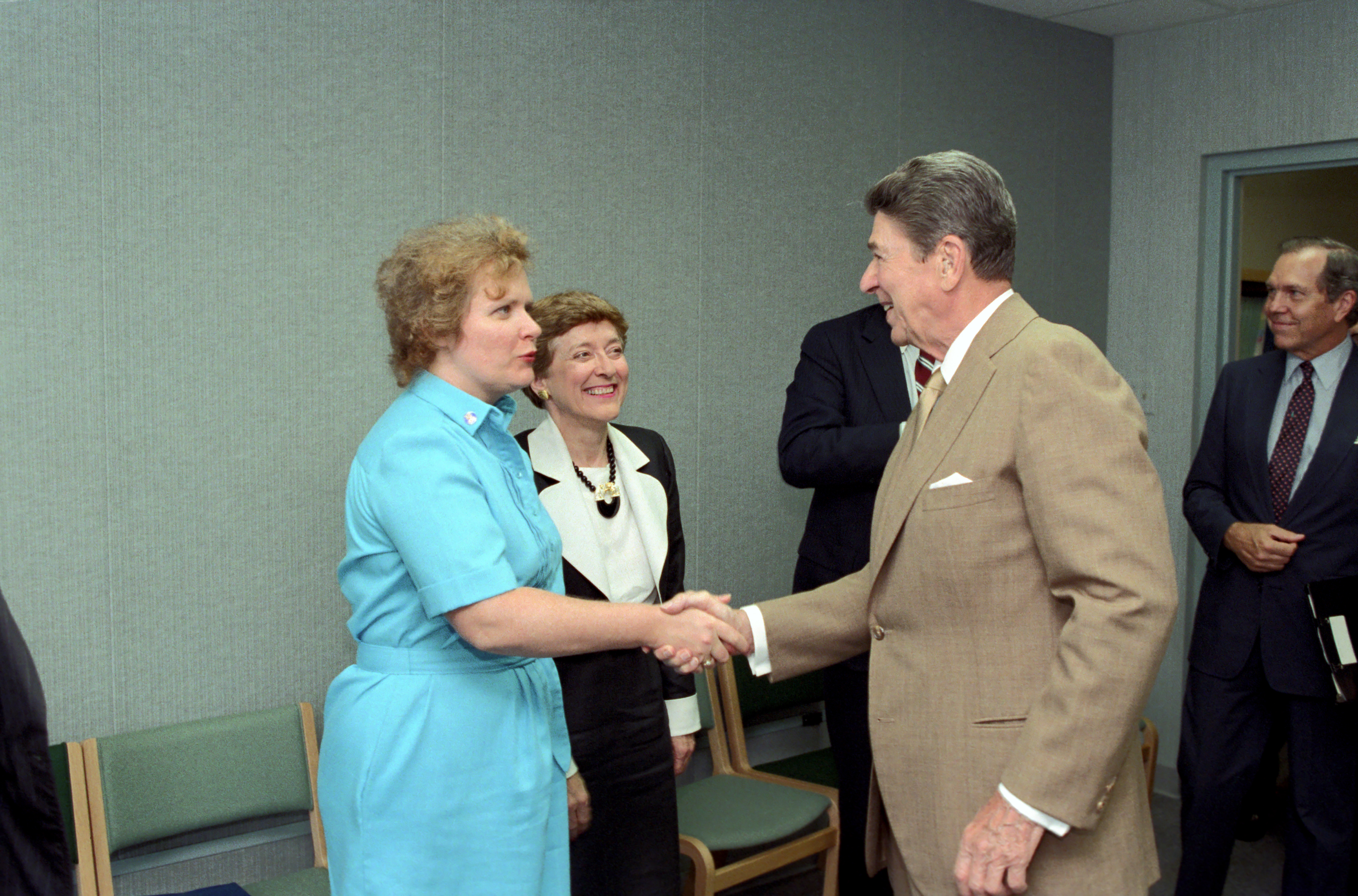
- Pullen (left) in 1987

Member of the Illinois House of Representatives from the 55th district
- In office 1977–1992
- Preceded by: Robert Juckett
- Succeeded by: Rosemary Mulligan

Republican National Committeewoman from Illinois
- In office 1984–1988

Personal details
- Born: March 2, 1947 (age 79) Buffalo, New York
- Party: Republican

Penny Pullen (born March 2, 1947) is an American politician and conservative activist. Pullen spent eight terms in the Illinois General Assembly representing a district in the northwest suburbs of Chicago. Pullen also served on various presidential commissions and is best known for her work on anti-abortion causes.

== Background ==
Born in Buffalo, New York, Pullen was raised in Park Ridge, Illinois. She was part of the first graduating class of Maine South High School in 1965 where she was classmates with Hillary Clinton. Pullen received her bachelor's degree in communications from University of Illinois at Chicago. Pullen worked as a television production technician, reporter, editorial assistant, and proof reader. She then worked as a staffer for State Representative Robert Juckett while in college and eventually ran to replace him following his death.

== Political career ==
In 1976, Pullen was elected to the Illinois House of Representatives as a Republican at age 29. She served for 16 years, eventually rising to the position of assistant minority leader. In 1980, Pullen successfully passed a bill that repealed the state's inheritance tax. President Ronald Reagan appointed her to the National Council on Educational Research in 1982.

Pullen also served on the board of the American Legislative Exchange Council focusing mainly on education issues. She opposed ratification of the Equal Rights Amendment (ERA) and worked alongside other conservative leaders like Phyllis Schlafly and Rev. Jerry Falwell Sr. to defeat the proposal in Illinois. From 1984 to 1988, Pullen served as the Republican National Committeewoman for Illinois.

Pullen passed numerous bills related to HIV/AIDS during her tenure including one that required mandatory AIDS testing for marriage-license applicants in Illinois. The marriage testing bill was later repealed after only 18 positive cases were found from 65,500 tests.

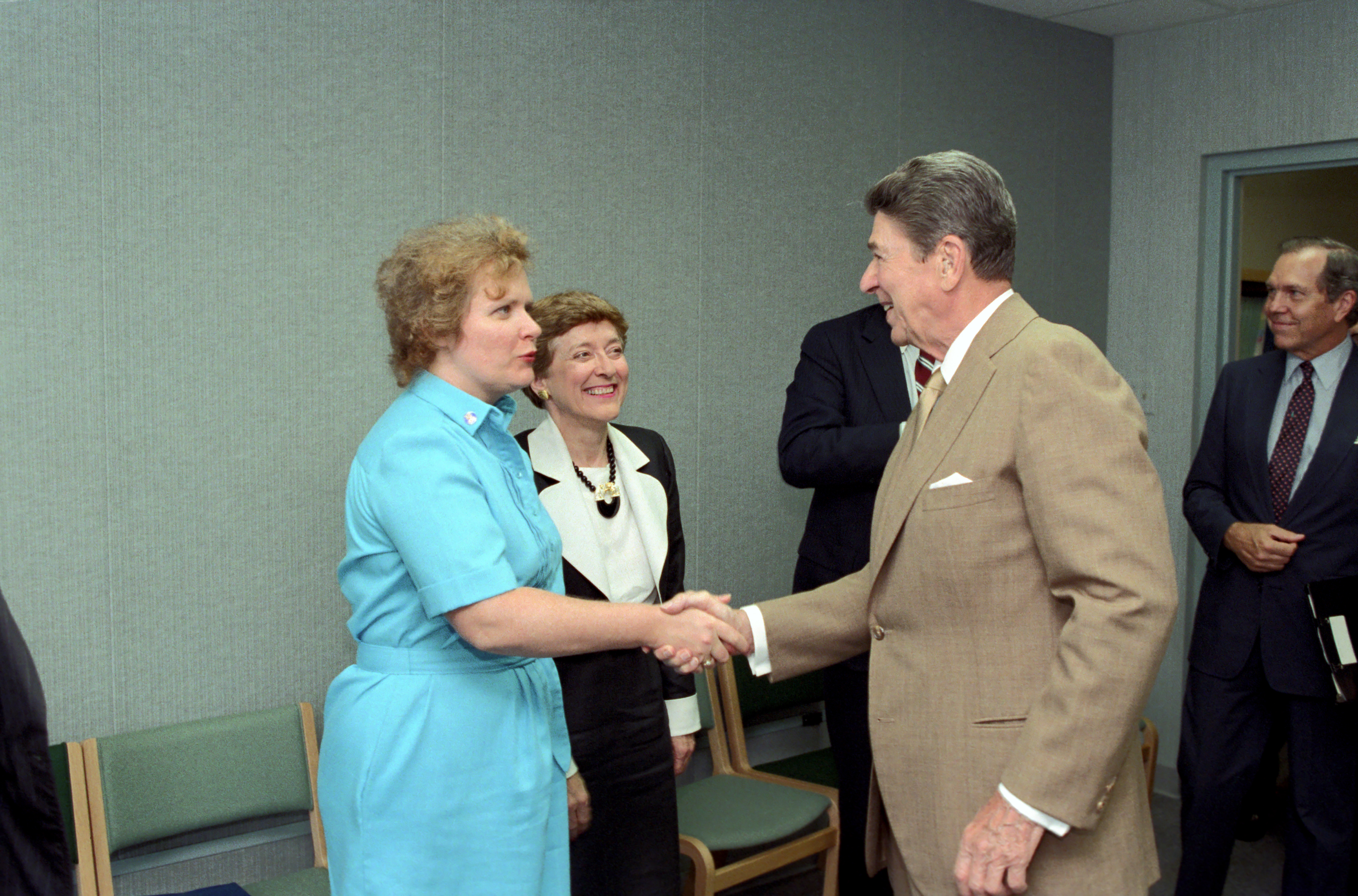
Pullen with President Reagan during the launch of the AIDS Commission at the National Institutes of Health on July 23, 1987

On July 23, 1987, Pullen was appointed by President Ronald Reagan to the President's Commission on the HIV Epidemic. Pullen would later be noted for her role in an Illinois law she sponsored which became the model for other states' criminalization-of-hiv-transmission laws.

During her time in the legislature, Pullen became a leader in the anti-abortion movement in Illinois. Following the United States Supreme Court's ruling upholding a Missouri abortion statute in Webster v. Reproductive Health Services, Pullen proposed similar laws in Illinois.

In 1990, Pullen ran for re-election in the Republican primary against Rosemary Mulligan, an abortion rights supporter. After the first count, Mulligan was named the winner by 11 votes. The courts then ordered a recount that left the vote tied, and so a coin toss was used to break the tie. Mulligan won the coin toss. Pullen then appealed to the Illinois Supreme Court, which did their own recount that left Pullen the winner. The race gained national attention for its focus on abortion and groups on both sides of the debate contributed heavily to the candidates. The recount case was later cited by Vice President Al Gore's legal team during the 2000 Florida recount as precedent for counting "dimpled chads".

Pullen was appointed to the board of the Legal Services Corporation (LSC) by President George H. W. Bush in 1990.

In 1992, Mulligan ran again and defeated Pullen in the Republican primary. Following the loss, Pullen served as the first executive director of the Illinois Family Institute. Pullen has also served as the President of the Illinois state chapter of the Eagle Forum.

Pullen was a supporter of the 2012 and 2016 presidential campaigns of Rick Santorum.
