= Reginald H. Phillips =

American politician

Reggie Phillips

Member of the Illinois House of Representatives from the 110th district
- In office January 2015 – January 2019
- Preceded by: Brad Halbrook
- Succeeded by: Chris Miller

Personal details
- Born: 1953 (age 72–73)
- Party: Republican
- Children: Christopher Phillips
- Profession: Business Owner

Reginald H. "Reggie" Phillips (born 1953) was a Republican member of the Illinois House of Representatives who represented the 110th district. He was sworn into office in January 2015. During his tenure, the 110th district, located in Downstate Illinois, includes Coles, Cumberland, Clark, Crawford and Lawrence counties.

On September 22, 2017, Phillips announced he would not run for a third term. He was succeeded by Republican Chris Miller.
