= Paul D. Froehlich =

American politician

Member of the Illinois House of Representatives from the 56th district
- In office 2003–2011
- Preceded by: Kathleen Wojcik
- Succeeded by: Michelle Mussman

Personal details
- Born: 1950 (age 75–76) Franklin Park, Illinois, U.S.
- Party: Democratic
- Spouse: Marilyn
- Education: Northeastern Illinois University (BA, MA)
- Profession: Teacher, Legislator

Paul D. Froehlich (born 1950) was a member of the Illinois House of Representatives representing the 56th district, where he served from 2003 to 2011.

== Education ==
Froehlich earned a B.A. in political science and an M.A. in history from Northeastern Illinois University.

== Republican Party posts ==
The biggest upset of his career came in 1998 when Froehlich was elected as the Schaumburg Township Republican Committeeman, defeating a 32-year incumbent by 55-45%. Froehlich formed S.T.A.R., the Schaumburg Township Alliance of Republicans, and in 2001 led the Republican Schaumburg township ticket to a complete sweep of all nine seats, ousting long-term incumbents loyal to the old committeeman.

Froehlich was Schaumburg township assessor.

== Illinois State Representative (2003-2010) ==
When State Representative Kay Wojcik was appointed to a vacant senate seat in 2003, Froehlich was appointed to fill the vacated post. The appointment was made by three party leaders, one of whom was Froehlich.

In 2004, Froehlich was elected without opposition. In 2006, he defeated a primary opponent, and was able to get his general election opponent tossed from the ballot.

In June 2007, Froehlich switched parties and became a Democrat. Republicans vowed revenge in the 2008 election. Froehlich won a primary challenge, and then defeated his Republican opponent by a landslide, 58-42%.

Cook County Board of Review commissioners and their staffs investigated whether Froehlich used any "undue influence" to get tax breaks for businesses in Froehlich's district. In April and May 2009, a grand jury subpoena sought records for 25 tax appeal cases. On July 29, 2009, the Board of Review, in a rare move, reversed four of the tax breaks, including the two hotels. Beginning as early as 2009, investigators for Cook County State's Attorney Anita Alvarez investigated whether Froehlich helped arrange property tax breaks for residents and businesses in exchange for campaign contributions and favors. Froehlich denied any wrongdoing, and no charges were filed.

In July, 2009, Froehlich announced his decision to not run again. His successor is Rep. Michelle Mussman, also a Democrat.

== Personal life ==
A Schaumburg resident, Froehlich is married and has three children.
