= Gary Hannig =

American politician (born 1952)

Member of the Illinois House of Representatives from the 98th district
- In office January 10, 1979 – February 27, 2009
- Preceded by: A. C. Bartulis
- Succeeded by: Betsy Hannig

Personal details
- Born: July 22, 1952 (age 74) Litchfield, Illinois
- Party: Democratic
- Spouse: Betsy Hannig
- Profession: Certified Public Accountant

Gary Hannig (born July 22, 1952) is a former Secretary of the Illinois Department of Transportation, having served in that post from 2009 to 2011, and was previously a Democratic member of the Illinois House of Representatives, representing the 98th District from 1979 to 2009.

Hannig, from Litchfield, was the Deputy House Majority Leader in the later years of his legislative career. and is one of House Speaker Michael Madigan's top lieutenants in the negotiation of budget legislation. In August 2008, Illinois Governor Rod Blagojevich blamed Hannig, who opposed Blagojevich's proposed capital bill, for House Democrats' not passing Blagojevich's budget. Blagojevich asked, “How can Gary Hannig, a good guy, stand in the way and work aggressively to kill jobs in Christian County. How can he justify standing in the way and being part of a leadership team that is prohibiting Route 29 from going from two lanes to four lanes. I love Gary Hannig, but Gary Hannig is a leader in this effort to kill jobs for downstate Illinois and central Illinois.”

Hannig replied, “Is he running against me for state representative, and no one told me yet? I'm going to challenge the residency requirements. He hasn't lived here 18 months.”

Blagojevich further accused Hannig of intending to raise taxes: “If Gary isn’t going to raise taxes next year after the election, he ought to sign a pledge right now and prove me wrong. I dare him. Sign the pledge, Gary.” Hannig replied to the Governor, “He can send me a copy of it.”

Later the same day, Blagojevich also singled out 10 Chicago Democrats for the failure of the bill.

== Political positions ==
Hannig said that he opposed Blagojevich's capital bill because it did not include what he viewed as necessary items for his district, in Christian County, Montgomery County and Macoupin County.

Representative Hannig was a member of an Illinois House's Special Investigative Committee, which determined whether or not there was sufficient grounds for impeachment against Rod Blagojevich.
