= Suzanne Bassi =

American politician (born 1945)

Member of the Illinois House of Representatives from the 54th district
- In office 1999 - 2011
- Preceded by: Robert L. Bergman
- Succeeded by: Thomas Morrison

Personal details
- Born: February 26, 1945 (age 81) Santa Ana, California
- Party: Republican
- Spouse: Roger
- Profession: high school teacher

Suzanne Bassi (born 1945) is a former Republican member of the Illinois House of Representatives, representing the 54th district from 1999 to 2010. Her predecessor was Robert L. Bergman. Bassi lost to Thomas Morrison in the Republican primary on February 2, 2010. In the 2016 Republican Party presidential primaries, Bassi was a delegate pledged to the presidential campaign of John Kasich.
