= Marty Moylan =

American politician

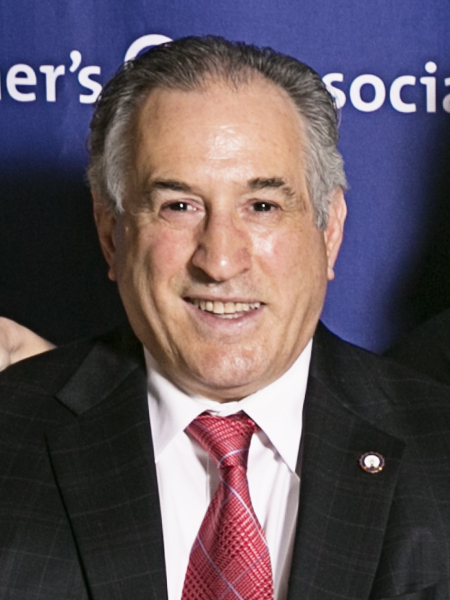
- Moylan in 2013

Member of the Illinois House of Representatives from the 55th district
- In office January 2013 – December 16, 2025
- Preceded by: Rosemary Mulligan
- Succeeded by: Justin Cochran

Mayor of Des Plaines
- In office May 2009 – December 2012
- Preceded by: Tony Arredia
- Succeeded by: Matthew Bogusz

Alderman of the Des Plaines City Council from the 2nd ward
- In office May 2003 – May 2009
- Succeeded by: John Robinson

Personal details
- Born: January 6, 1951 (age 75)
- Party: Democratic
- Profession: IBEW electrician

Martin J. "Marty" Moylan (born 1951) is a former Democratic member of the Illinois House of Representatives from the 55th district. The 55th district includes all or parts of Des Plaines, Morton Grove, Niles, Park Ridge and the Edison Park neighborhood in Chicago. He served between January 2013 and December 2025.

== Personal life ==
Marty Moylan was named after his father and grandfather and great grandfather, all named Martin. He is the father of Martin "Colt" Moylan V and grandfather of Martin "Jaxx" Moylan VI. Colt Moylan was elected to the Des Plaines city council in 2019, assuming the position once held by Marty Moylan before being elected Mayor and State Representative.

== Illinois House of Representatives ==
In the 2012 general election, Moylan was elected to the Illinois House of Representatives to represent the 55th district. His predecessor was Rosemary Mulligan. The 55th district included all or parts of Arlington Heights, Des Plaines, Elk Grove Village, Park Ridge and the Edison Park neighborhood in Chicago.

As part of the 2021 decennial reapportionment, all areas west of Lee Street were removed from the district while areas in Morton Grove and Niles were added. Moylan retired rather than run for reelection in the 2026 election. On December 9th, Moylan announced his resignation effective December 16, 2025.

=== Committee assignments ===
As of July 3, 2022, Representative Moylan is a member of the following Illinois House committees:

- Business & Innovation Subcommittee (HLBR-BUIN)
- Cities & Villages Committee (HCIV)
- Labor & Commerce Committee (HLBR)
- Natural Gas Subcommittee (HPUB-NGAS)
- Police & Fire Committee (SHPF)
- Public Utilities Committee (HPUB)
- (Chairman of) Roadways, Rail & Aviation Subcommittee (HTRR-ROAD)
- (Chairman of) Transportation: Regulation, Roads & Bridges Committee (HTRR)

== Electoral history ==
Des Plaines, Illinois City Mayor General Election, 2009
Party	Candidate	Votes	%
Independent	Martin J. Moylan	4,145	43.20
Independent	Dick Sayad	2,668	27.81
Independent	Mark Thompson	2,223	23.17
Independent	Michael E. Lake	559	5.83
Total votes		9,595	100.0

Illinois 55th State House District General Election, 2012
Party	Candidate	Votes	%
Democratic	Martin J. Moylan	21,321	53.26
Republican	Susan Sweeney	18,711	46.74
Total votes		40,032	100.0

Illinois 55th State House District General Election, 2014
Party	Candidate	Votes	%
Democratic	Martin J. Moylan (incumbents)	15,209	52.71
Republican	Mel Thillens	13,647	47.29
Total votes		28,856	100.0

Illinois 55th State House District General Election, 2016
Party	Candidate	Votes	%
Democratic	Martin J. Moylan (incumbents)	25,717	59.08
Republican	Dan Gott	17,811	40.92
Total votes		43,528	100.0

Illinois 55th State House District General Election, 2018
Party	Candidate	Votes	%
Democratic	Martin J. Moylan (incumbents)	20,449	55.63
Republican	Marilyn Smolenski	16,308	44.37
Total votes		36,757	100.0
