= Eli Ulery House =

Historic house in Illinois, United States

- U.S. National Register of Historic Places
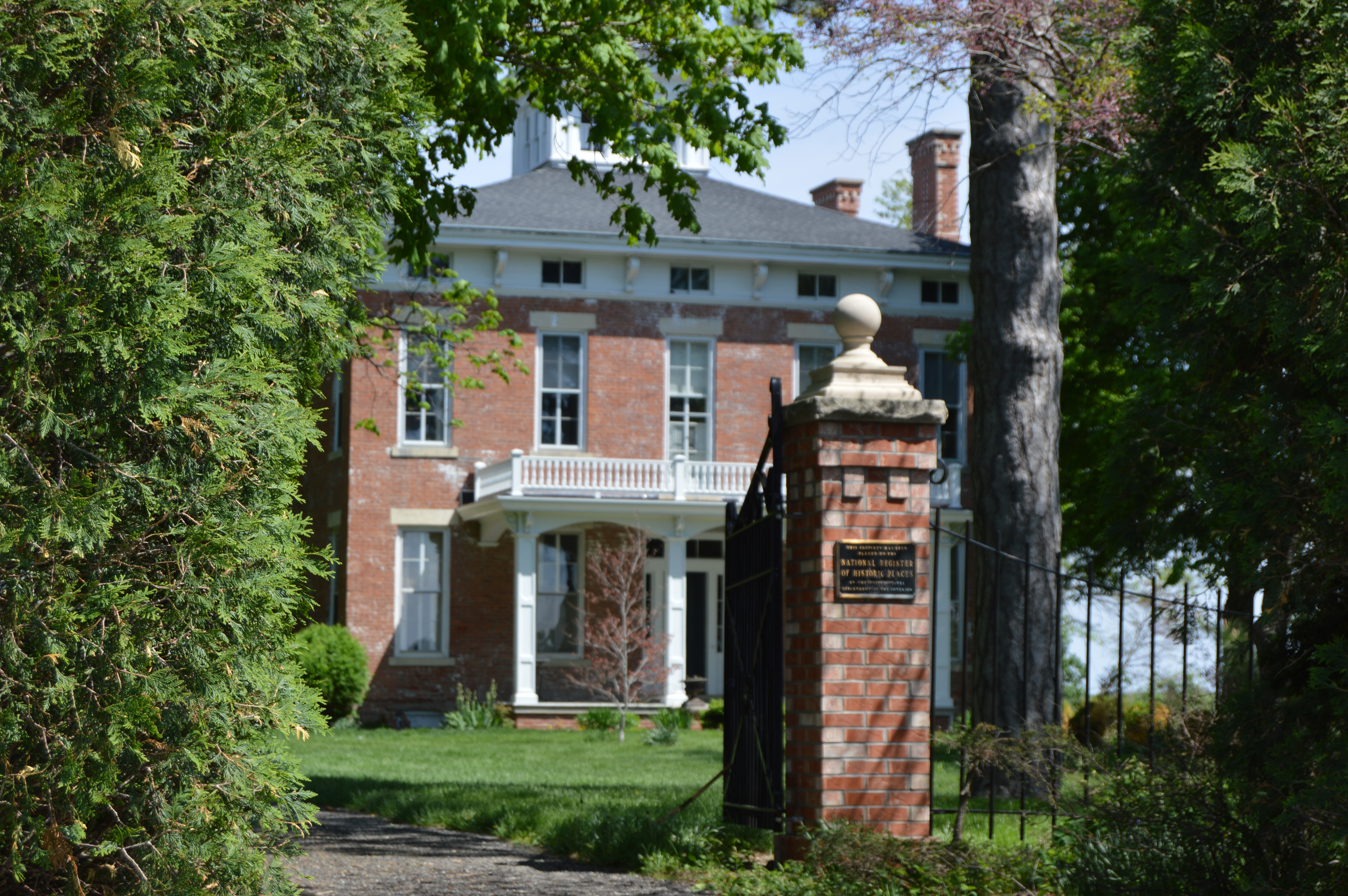

- Location within Illinois Location within the United States
- Nearest city: Mount Zion, Illinois
- Coordinates: 39°45′49″N 88°50′6″W
- Area: less than one acre
- Built: 1860
- Architectural style: Italianate
- NRHP reference No.: 79000854
- Added to NRHP: October 1, 1979

The Eli Ulery House is a historic house located on County Route 60 southeast of Mount Zion, Illinois. The house was built circa 1860 for Eli Ulery, an early settler of Macon County. The Italianate structures features bracketed eaves and a cupola atop the roof. Ulery came to the county in the 1830s; he worked as a cowboy until he started his own cattle farm in 1851. Ulery became wealthy enough to build his house in the ensuing decade, and by his death in 1897 he had more than doubled his holdings and branched out into horse breeding and crop farming. His son, Eli S. Ulery, continued to expand the farm and donated land for a 40-acre (16 ha) Chautauqua park.

The house was added to the National Register of Historic Places on October 1, 1979.
