= Tom Morrison (Illinois politician) =

American politician from Illinois

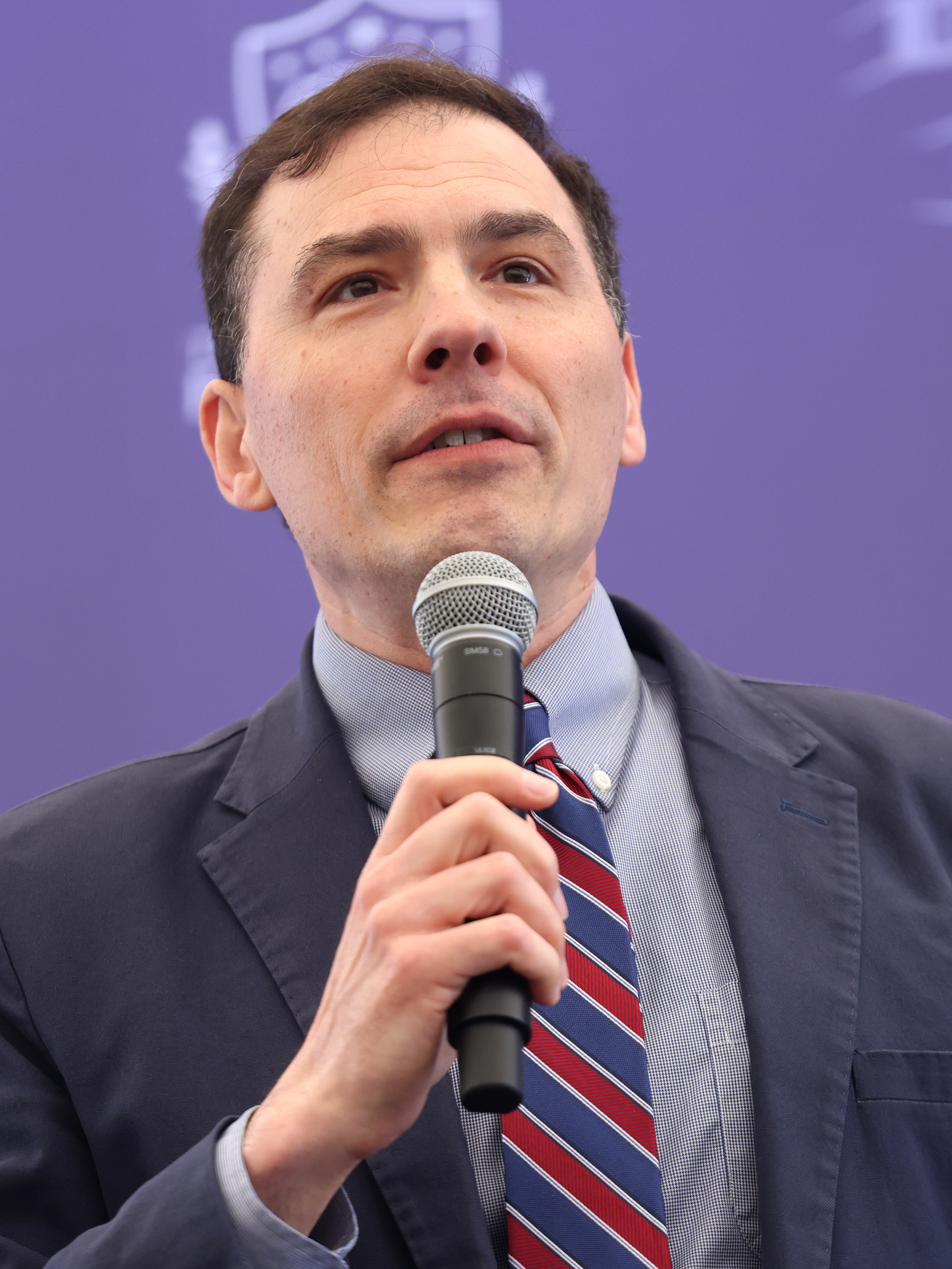
- Morrison at 2026 Educators Summit in Lincolnshire, Illinois

Member of the Illinois House of Representatives from the 54th district
- In office January 12, 2011 – January 11, 2023
- Preceded by: Suzanne Bassi
- Succeeded by: Mary Beth Canty

Personal details
- Party: Republican
- Education: Hillsdale College

Thomas R. Morrison was a Republican member of the Illinois General Assembly for 54th House district, which includes all or portions of Palatine, Rolling Meadows, Inverness, Hoffman Estates, Arlington Heights, Barrington, and Schaumburg.

== Education and career ==
Morrison is a graduate of Hillsdale College where he received a B.A. in History and Communications. Out of college he was a radio news reporter and anchor before beginning a career as a fifth grade teacher. He has experience as a small business owner, having owned and operated two ServPro franchises, Palatine/Rolling Meadows and Elk Grove/Itasca/Roselle, for six years.

He was elected to the Illinois House of Representatives in 2010.

As of July 3, 2022, Representative Morrison is a member of the following Illinois House committees:

- Elementary & Secondary Education: Administration, Licenses & Charter Committee (HELO)
- Elementary & Secondary Education: School Curriculum & Policies Committee (HELM)
- Energy & Environment Committee (HENG)
- Insurance Committee (HINS)
- Personnel & Pensions Committee (HPPN)

== Positions and legislation ==
Rep. Morrison is a proponent of reducing the overall tax burden on Illinois residents and reigning in property taxes. He filed legislation to require a two-thirds majority vote for all tax increases which would push the General Assembly toward spending reforms before increased taxation. He is a co-sponsor of the No Funds Without Revenue Estimate bill, designed to help the legislature pass a balanced budget.

Morrison is a proponent of pension reform. He sponsored legislation to end Illinois taxpayer-funded legislative pensions. Morrison was the first Illinois State Representative to turn down the legislative pension benefit, saying, “If I had remained in the system, I would have been seen as part of the problem. I had to opt out.” He has been outspoken about the multi-billion dollar pension liability on taxpayers and on the General Assembly's failure to meaningfully address the problem faced by both public workers and taxpayers. Morrison's plan would lock in earned pension benefits and move employees to a defined contribution plan on a go-forward basis.

Rep. Morrison is known as a hardliner on social issues. In 2016, he authored legislation denying young transgender children access to the restroom of their identity. He opposes abortion in all circumstances, including rape and incest, voted No on an equal pay bill, and also voted no on the ERA. Previously, he attempted to Constitutionally ban same-sex marriage in Illinois. Upon being re-elected in 2018, Rep. Morrison authored legislation to punish doctors for providing transition healthcare to transgender children experiencing gender dysphoria. This legislation was condemned by Lurie Children's Hospital of Chicago Rep. Morrison has an A rating from the NRA.

== Community Involvement ==
Rep. Morrison was named the Illinois Coalition of Community Blood Centers 2020 Legislator of the Year for his work in hosting multiple blood drives. He is a member of the Sons of the American Legion Post 690. He is a member of the Palatine Chamber of Commerce and Rolling Meadows Chamber of Commerce. He serves on the Leadership Council of WINGS Program domestic violence agency.

== Electoral history ==
Morrison defeated incumbent State Representative Suzanne Bassi in the Republican primary on February 2, 2010, receiving 54.3% of the vote, to Bassi's 45.7%. Morrison went on to defeat Democrat Matt Flamm in the general election, receiving 61.9% of the vote, to Flamm's 38.1%. Morrison defeated Richard Rudd in 2012 with 59.08% of the vote. He won the 2014 election against Laddi Singh with 65.92% of the vote, and in 2016, he ran unopposed. In 2018, he defeated Maggie Trevor by only 43 votes, receiving 50.05% of votes cast. In 2020, he defeated Maggie Trevor, receiving 51.81% of votes cast.

On January 11, 2022, Morrison announced he will not be running for re-election in 2022.

Illinois 54th State House District Republican Primary, 2010
Party	Candidate	Votes	%
Republican	Thomas R. "Tom" Morrison	5,409	54.29
Republican	Suzanne "Suzie" Bassi (incumbent)	4,554	45.71
Total votes		9,963	100.0

Illinois 54th State House District General Election, 2010
Party	Candidate	Votes	%
Republican	Thomas R. "Tom" Morrison	19,521	61.90
Democratic	Matt Flamm	12,013	38.10
Total votes		31,534	100.0

Illinois 54th State House District General Election, 2012
Party	Candidate	Votes	%
Republican	Tom Morrison (incumbent)	27,123	59.08
Democratic	Richard S. Rudd	18,786	40.92
Total votes		45,909	100.0

Illinois 54th State House District General Election, 2014
Party	Candidate	Votes	%
Republican	Tom Morrison (incumbent)	21,973	65.92
Democratic	Laddi K. Singh	11,360	34.08
Total votes		33,333	100.0

Illinois 54th State House District General Election, 2016
Party	Candidate	Votes	%
Republican	Tom Morrison (incumbent)	38,846	100.0
Total votes		38,846	100.0

Illinois 54th State House District General Election, 2018
Party	Candidate	Votes	%
Republican	Tom Morrison (incumbent)	22,490	50.05
Democratic	Maggie Trevor	22,447	49.95
Total votes		44,937	100.0

Illinois 54th State House District General Election, 2020
Party	Candidate	Votes	%
Republican	Tom Morrison (incumbent)	30,121	51.81
Democratic	Maggie Trevor	28,017	48.19
Total votes		58,138	100.0
