= Kathleen Wojcik =

American politician (born 1936)

Kathleen L. "Kay" Wojcik (née Zorger) (born July 15, 1936) is a former American businesswoman and politician.

Born in Chicago, Illinois, Wojcik went to William Rainey Harper College. She was in the real estate business and lived in Schaumburg, Illinois. In 1968, Wojcik served as Schaumburg Township clerk. Wojcik served in the Illinois House of Representatives from 1983 to 2003. Wojcik was appointed to succeed Doris Karpiel in the Senate. Paul Froehlich was appointed to succeed Wojcik in the Illinois House. She then served in the Illinois Senate from 2003 until her retirement in 2005. She was a Republican and served as a central committeewoman on the Illinois Republican Party elected by Republican precinct committeemen from what was then Illinois's 6th congressional district.
