= Roger L. Eddy =

American politician

Member of the Illinois House of Representatives from the 109th district
- In office January 8, 2003 – March 22, 2012
- Preceded by: Kurt Granberg (renumbered)
- Succeeded by: Brad Halbrook

Personal details
- Born: May 8, 1958 (age 68) Ottawa, Illinois
- Party: Republican
- Spouse: Rebecca
- Children: Five
- Education: Northern Illinois University (B.S.); Eastern Illinois University (M.A.)
- Profession: Educator; Politician

Roger L. Eddy (born 1958) is a former Republican member of the Illinois House of Representatives, representing the 109th district from 2003 to 2012.

Eddy earned a Bachelor of Science from Northern Illinois University and a Master of Arts in education administration from Eastern Illinois University. He has been a teacher, coach, school principal and superintendent. His most recent educational position is as superintendent of Hutsonville Unit 1 school district in Crawford County. He and his wife, Becca, also a teacher, reside near Hutsonville and are the parents of five children.

In the 2001 decennial redistricting process, the 109th district was drawn to include Clark, Crawford, Cumberland, Edgar, Lawrence, Shelby, and Wabash counties in east-central Illinois. Roger Eddy won a three-way Republican primary and in the general election, Eddy defeated Democratic candidate James W. Lane Jr. of Robinson, Illinois. He was re-elected by large margins in 2004 and 2006.

During the 2008 Republican Party presidential primaries, Peraica served on the Illinois leadership team of the presidential campaign of former New York City Mayor Rudy Giuliani.

As a representative, Eddy has focused on agriculture and education issues, and has generally supported pro-business legislation. Some of his major legislative successes have included passage of legislation to combat methamphetamine, the prevalence of which is a dangerous problem in the rural Midwest. Eddy wrote the book, A Front Row Seat: The Impeachment of Rob Blagojevich.

Eddy opted not to run for reelection in 2012 after taking a job as the executive director of the Illinois Association of School Boards. Eddy resigned from the Illinois House of Representatives on March 22, 2012. On April 2, 2012, Brad Halbrook, the Republican nominee for the 110th district in the 2012 general election, was appointed by local Republican leaders to succeed Eddy in the 109th district for the remainder of the 97th General Assembly. Halbrook subsequently won election to the 98th General Assembly from the 110th district.

On March 5, 2021, Governor J. B. Pritzker appointed Eddy to the Illinois State Board of Education to succeed Jane Quinlan for a term ending January 8, 2025. His appointment was confirmed by the Illinois Senate on March 8, 2022.
