= Bill Mitchell (politician) =

American politician (born 1960)

Member of the Illinois House of Representatives from the 101st district
- In office January 9, 2013 – January 9, 2019
- Preceded by: Adam Brown
- Succeeded by: Dan Caulkins

Member of the Illinois House of Representatives from the 87th district
- In office January 10, 2003 – January 9, 2013
- Preceded by: Dan Rutherford
- Succeeded by: Rich Brauer

Member of the Illinois House of Representatives from the 102nd district
- In office January 13, 1999 – January 10, 2003
- Preceded by: Duane Noland
- Succeeded by: Ron Stephens

Personal details
- Born: March 29, 1960 (age 66) Decatur, Illinois, U.S.
- Party: Republican
- Education: Eastern Illinois University

Bill Mitchell (born March 29, 1960) is an American politician who served as a three-time Illinois House of Representatives member.

== Early life and education ==
Mitchell was born in Decatur, Illinois. He earned a Bachelor of Arts degree in political science from Eastern Illinois University in 1982.

== Career ==
Mitchell began his career as a Decatur City Councilman, Macon County Republican Chairman, and Mayor Pro Tem. During his time in local government, he supported curfew laws and made efforts to cut government waste, reduce taxes and institute juvenile justice reform.

In 2011, Mitchell joined State Representative Adam Brown of the 101st district to propose statehood for Cook County. Mitchell said that Chicago is "dictating its views" to the rest of the state and Brown added that Chicago "overshadows" the rest of Illinois.

An August 30, 2003, article in the Bloomington–Normal newspaper The Pantagraph stated that Mitchell was arrested for DUI near Heyworth, Illinois, and was also charged with improper traffic lane usage. The McLean County Sheriff's report indicated that his breath-alcohol level was 0.186 percent, which is more than twice Illinois legal BAC limit of 0.08. Mitchell pleaded guilty to both charges and was sentenced to 24 months of court supervision.

Mitchell retired after the 100th General Assembly and was succeeded by fellow Republican and Eastern Illinois University Trustee Dan Caulkins.
