= Doris Karpiel =

American politician

Doris Catherine Karpiel (born September 21, 1935) is a former American businesswoman and politician.

Born in Chicago, Illinois, Karpiel received her associate degree from Morton College in 1955. She then received her bachelor's degree in political science from Northern Illinois University in 1976. Karpiel was in the real estate business and lived in Carol Stream, Illinois. She served as supervisor for the Bloomingdale Township and was involved with the Republican Party. She was appointed by the 2nd District Republican Legislative Committee to fill the vacancy left by the appointment of John Friedland to the Illinois Senate. She was sworn into office December 27, 1979. Karpiel served in the Illinois House of Representatives from 1979 to 1984 and then served in the Illinois Senate from 1984 to 2003. Karpiel served as a member of the Illinois Pollution Control Board from January 10, 2003, to November 30, 2003. State Representative Kathleen Wojcik was appointed to succeed Karpiel in the Senate. During the 2008 Republican Party presidential primaries, Karpiel ran to be a delegate to the 2008 Republican National Convention from Illinois's 6th congressional district for the presidential campaign of former Governor Mitt Romney.
