= Wayne Rosenthal (politician) =

American politician

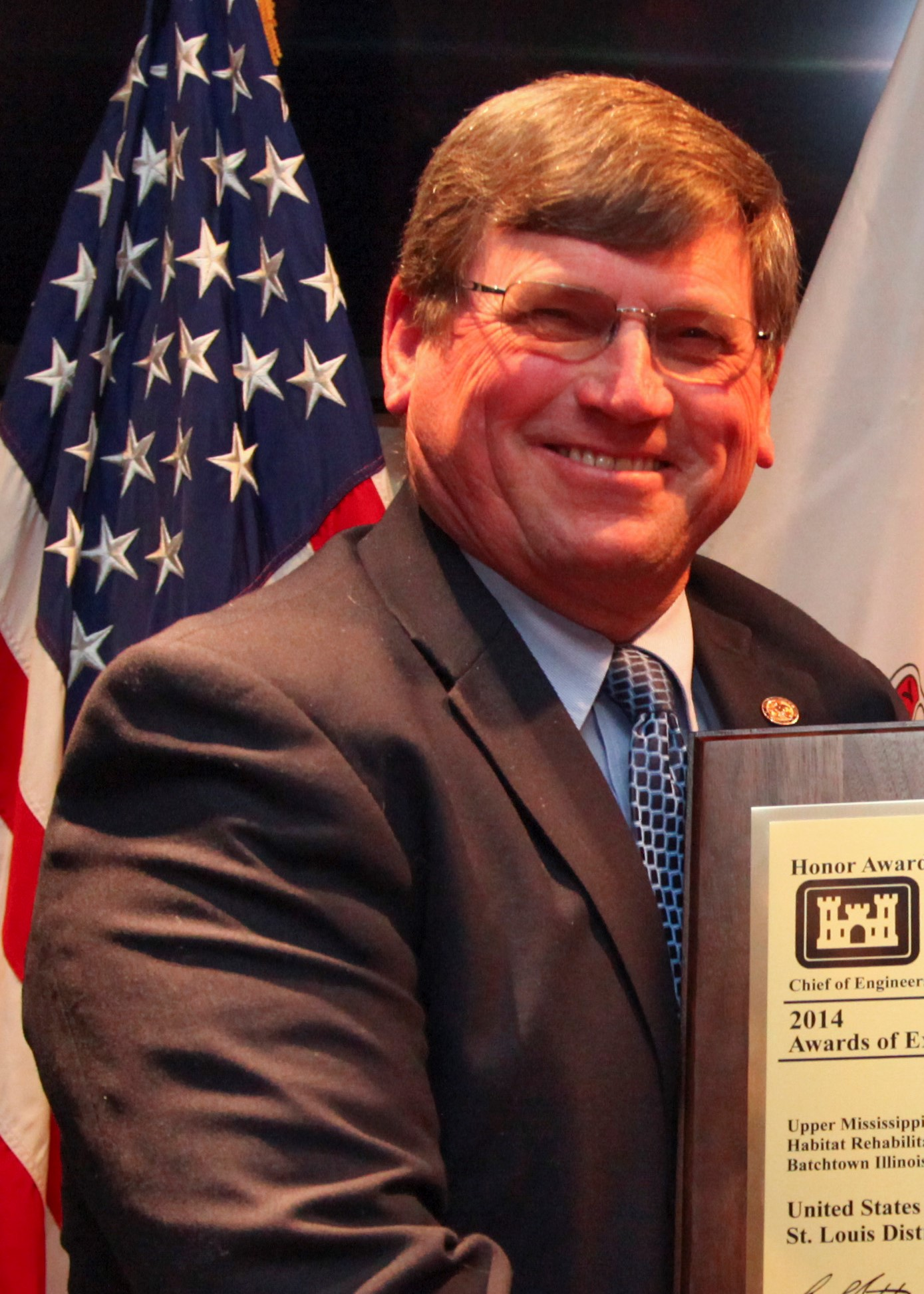

Member of the Illinois House of Representatives
- Incumbent
- Assumed office January 2023
- Preceded by: Charles Meier (redistricted)
- Constituency: 108th district (2023–present)
- In office January 2011 – January 19, 2015
- Preceded by: Betsy Hannig
- Succeeded by: Avery Bourne
- Constituency: 95th district (2013–2015); 98th district (2011–2013)

Personal details
- Born: May 16, 1950 (age 76)
- Party: Republican
- Spouse: Marcia Rosenthal
- Children: 3
- Education: University of Illinois Springfield
- Profession: Farmer

Military service
- Allegiance: United States
- Branch/service: Air National Guard
- Years of service: 1971–2001
- Rank: Brigadier General
- Unit: 170th Fighter Squadron

Wayne Arthur Rosenthal is an American politician and retired military officer. He is a Republican member of the Illinois House of Representatives. He was sworn into office January 2023 and previously served in this position from January 2011 to January 2015.

== Early and personal life ==
Wayne Arthur Rosenthal was born May 16, 1950. He has a bachelor's degree in math from the University of Illinois Springfield. He spent his career running a family farm. Prior to his election to the General Assembly he served as a trustee of Lincoln Land Community College. Rosenthal and his wife Marcia are the parents of three children.

== Political career ==
In 2009, Rosenthal was the sole Republican to file for the Republican nomination for the 98th district. In the 2010 general election, Rosenthal defeated Democratic candidate and former Macoupin County coroner Charlie Landers with 15,235 votes to Landers’ 10,932 votes.

He served in office from January 2011 until his resignation effective January 19, 2015 to head the Illinois Department of Natural Resources. The Republican Representative Committee of the Republican Party of the 95th Representative District appointed law student Avery Bourne to the vacancy effective February 14, 2015. Wayne Rosenthal served as Director of IDNR until March 3, 2019 when he was succeeded by J. B. Pritzker appointee Colleen Callahan.

Rosenthal announced that he will run in the 2022 elections for the Illinois House of Representatives in the newly drawn 108th District. The new 108th district covers all of Menard County, and portions of Sangamon, Christian, Macoupin, and Montgomery Counties. Rosenthal won the Republican nomination and the general election unopposed.

== Military career ==
Rosenthal is a graduate of the U.S. Air Force Fighter Weapons Instructor Course and undergraduate Navigator Training. He spent 18 years as a Weapons Systems Operator in the F-4 Phantom. He served for a time as the Commander of the 170th Fighter Squadron. He retired from the Illinois Air National Guard as 183rd logistics Group Commander with the rank of Brigadier General.
