= Betsy Hannig =

American politician (born 1963)

Member of the Illinois House of Representatives from the 98th district
- In office March 10, 2009 – January 11, 2011
- Preceded by: Gary Hannig
- Succeeded by: Wayne Rosenthal

Personal details
- Born: November 10, 1963 (age 62)
- Party: Democratic
- Spouse: Gary Hannig (m. 1980)
- Education: University of Illinois

Elizabeth "Betsy" Hannig (born November 10, 1963) is a former Democratic member of the Illinois House of Representatives, having been unanimously appointed by the Democratic Party chairmen of Christian, Fayette, Macoupin, Madison, Montgomery, and Shelby counties on March 10, 2009. Her appointment came after the resignation of her husband, Gary Hannig, who was appointed by Governor Pat Quinn to be Illinois Secretary of Transportation, leaving his seat vacant.

Upon her appointment, Hannig disclosed that while she would serve the remainder of her husband's term, she would not run for reelection in 2010.

At the time of her appointment, Hannig worked for the Teachers' Retirement System of the State of Illinois.
