= Rosemary Mulligan =

American politician

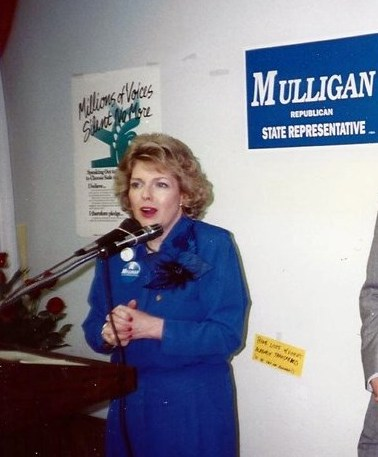
- Rosemary Mulligan on election night on March 20, 1990.

Member of the Illinois House of Representatives from the 55th district
- In office 1993 - 2013
- Preceded by: Penny Pullen
- Succeeded by: Marty Moylan

Personal details
- Born: July 8, 1941 Chicago, Illinois
- Died: December 30, 2014 (aged 73) Des Plaines, Illinois
- Party: Republican
- Profession: Paralegal

Rosemary Mulligan (July 8, 1941 – December 30, 2014) served as a Republican Party member of the Illinois House of Representatives for ten terms, representing the 55th District in the northwest suburbs of Chicago from 1993 until 2013. A moderate Republican, Mulligan was particularly known as a strong abortion rights advocate.

== Background ==
Born in Chicago, Illinois, Mulligan went to Illinois State University and then received her associate degree in legal technology from Harper College. Mulligan's father was murdered in 1967 while picking up a shift for a friend as an insurance salesman. Her first husband was killed in a plane crash during a hunting trip in Canada, which left her as the single mother of two boys.

Mulligan worked as a paralegal at a firm in the northwest suburbs before running for office.

== Political career ==
Mulligan first ran for the Illinois House of Representatives in 1990, eventually losing the Republican primary to conservative incumbent Penny Pullen by six votes. After the first count, Mulligan was actually named the winner by 31 votes on election night. A recount was eventually ordered that left the vote tied, and so a coin toss was used to break the tie. Mulligan won the coin toss. Pullen then appealed to the Illinois Supreme Court, which ordered a count of disputed ballots that left Pullen the winner by six votes. The case, Pullen v. Mulligan, was later cited by Vice President Al Gore's legal team as precedent for counting "dimpled chads" during the 2000 Florida recount. The race gained national attention for its focus on abortion and groups on both sides of the debate contributed heavily to the candidates. Mulligan ran again in 1992 against Pullen and won.

On January 12, 2011, Rep. Mulligan was sworn in for her tenth (and ultimately final) term as state representative. During her 20-year tenure in the Illinois House, she became a leader on state budget issues (particularly human service appropriations), family issues, health care, and early childhood education.

She was recognized for her expertise in prescription drugs, problem and compulsive gambling, health insurance coverage and reforms, welfare to work and victims' rights. She served as majority chair or minority spokesman of the Illinois House Human Services Appropriations Committee for 10 years. She received numerous awards and honors and was named "One of the Top 100 Women Making a Difference" by Today's Chicago Woman.

Following redistricting, Mulligan opted to seek election in the 55th District, but failed to make the ballot after collecting below the minimum threshold required number of voter signatures. She died following a period of declining health on December 30, 2014, at the age of 73.
