= Jim Sacia =

American politician

Member of the Illinois House of Representatives from the 89th district
- In office January 2003 – September 30, 2013
- Preceded by: Keith Sommer (redistricted)
- Succeeded by: Brian Stewart

Personal details
- Born: March 5, 1944 (age 82) Winona, Minnesota, U.S.
- Party: Republican
- Spouse: Jenny Sacia
- Children: 3
- Education: University of Wisconsin
- Profession: Business Owner; FBI Agent (retired)

Jim Sacia (born 1944) is a former Republican member of the Illinois House of Representatives, serving the 89th district from January 2003 to October 2013 when he was succeeded by Brian Stewart. The district, located in the northwest corner of the state, includes all or parts of Coleta, East Dubuque, Freeport, Galena, Lena, Mount Carroll, Mount Morris, Stockton and Winnebago.

== Early life, education and career ==
Sacia was born in Winona, Minnesota. He attended the University of Wisconsin–River Falls and Wisconsin State University, receiving bachelor's degrees from both.

From 1962 to 1965, Sacia was an enlisted member of the US Army. However, he was a commissioned officer in the Army National Guard from 1965 to 1969.

Sacia was a police officer in River Falls, Wisconsin from 1967 to 1969. He became a Special Agent for the Federal Bureau of Investigation from 1969 to 1997.

Since 1997, he is the President & CEO of NITE Equipment Inc.

== Political career ==
During the 2001 decennial redistricting process, the 74th district situated in northwestern Illinois was renumbered the 89th district. The "new" 89th district expanded eastward from the 74th district's base of Jo Daviess, Stephenson, and Carroll counties to include portions of Ogle and Winnebago counties.

Ron Lawfer, the incumbent for the 74th district and resident of the 89th district, chose to retire from the Illinois House after five terms. In the 2002 election, Sacia won a competitive five-way Republican primary and defeated Democratic candidate Warwick Stevenson, a high school principal and member of the Stevenson family in the general election.

From 2003 to 2013, Sacia was an Illinois Representative. During the 2011 decennial redistricting process, the 89th district remained largely in its 2001 form.

On August 22, 2013, Sacia submitted his resignation from the Illinois House of Representatives effective September 30, 2013. The Committee of the Republican Party of the 89th Representative District appointed Brian W. Stewart to the vacancy. Stewart was sworn into office on October 4, 2013.

== Personal life ==
Sacia and his wife Jenny reside in Pecatonica, Illinois and have three adult sons. In 2019, Sacia published his memoir Not in My Wildest Dreams: Memoirs of a Veteran FBI Agent.
