= Mount Zion, Illinois =

- Village
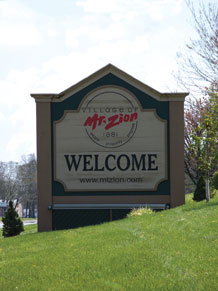
- Welcome sign

- Location in Macon County, Illinois
- Coordinates: 39°46′38″N 88°52′37″W
- Country: United States
- State: Illinois
- County: Macon
- Townships: Mount Zion, Long Creek
- Founded: 1881

Government
  - Type: Trustee-Mayor
  - Mayor: Luke Williams

Area
  - Total: 4.28 sq mi (11.1 km^{2})
  - Land: 4.28 sq mi (11.1 km^{2})
  - Water: 0.00 sq mi (0 km^{2})
- Elevation: 633 ft (193 m)

Population (2020)
  - Total: 6,019
  - Density: 1,414.7/sq mi (546.22/km^{2})
- Time zone: UTC-6 (CST)
  - Summer (DST): UTC-5 (CDT)
- ZIP code: 62549
- Area code: 217
- FIPS code: 17-51206
- GNIS feature ID: 2399419
- Website: www.mtzion.com

Mount Zion is a village in Macon County, Illinois, United States. The population was 6,019 at the 2020 census.

== Geography ==
Mount Zion is located in southeastern Macon County. It is bordered to the northwest by the city of Decatur, the county seat, and to the north by the village of Long Creek. Illinois Route 121 passes through the village, leading northwest 8 miles (13 km) to the center of Decatur and southeast 19 miles (31 km) to Sullivan.

According to the U.S. Census Bureau, the village of Mount Zion has a total area of 4.28 square miles (11.1 km^{2}), of which 0.003 square miles (1.9 acres), or 0.07%, are water. The village is drained to the north by Finley Creek and Big Creek, part of the Sangamon River watershed.

== Demographics ==
Historical population
Census	Pop.	Note	%±
1880	243		—
1900	370		—
1910	330		−10.8%
1920	330		0.0%
1930	405		22.7%
1940	384		−5.2%
1950	438		14.1%
1960	925		111.2%
1970	2,343		153.3%
1980	4,563		94.8%
1990	4,522		−0.9%
2000	4,845		7.1%
2010	5,833		20.4%
2020	6,019		3.2%
U.S. Decennial Census

=== 2020 census ===
As of the 2020 census, Mount Zion had a population of 6,019. The median age was 39.9 years. 26.0% of residents were under the age of 18 and 17.8% of residents were 65 years of age or older. For every 100 females there were 94.3 males, and for every 100 females age 18 and over there were 90.4 males age 18 and over.

97.2% of residents lived in urban areas, while 2.8% lived in rural areas.

There were 2,322 households in Mount Zion, of which 36.8% had children under the age of 18 living in them. Of all households, 59.5% were married-couple households, 12.8% were households with a male householder and no spouse or partner present, and 23.1% were households with a female householder and no spouse or partner present. About 24.1% of all households were made up of individuals and 10.9% had someone living alone who was 65 years of age or older.

There were 2,502 housing units, of which 7.2% were vacant. The homeowner vacancy rate was 2.5% and the rental vacancy rate was 12.0%.

Racial composition as of the 2020 census
Race	Number	Percent
White	5,517	91.7%
Black or African American	81	1.3%
American Indian and Alaska Native	9	0.1%
Asian	106	1.8%
Native Hawaiian and Other Pacific Islander	1	0.0%
Some other race	48	0.8%
Two or more races	257	4.3%
Hispanic or Latino (of any race)	101	1.7%

=== Demographic estimates ===
As of the 2022 American Community Survey estimates, there were 6,255 people and 2,198 households. The population density was 1,465.9 inhabitants per square mile (566.0/km^{2}). There were 2,335 housing units at an average density of 547.2 per square mile (211.3/km^{2}). The racial makeup of the city was 93.4% White, 2.6% Black or African American, 2.4% Asian, and 0.6% some other race, with 1.0% from two or more races. Hispanics or Latinos of any race were 1.0% of the population.

Of the 2,198 households, 39.9% had children under the age of 18 living with them, 31.8% had seniors 65 years or older living with them, 70.2% were married couples living together, 2.2% were couples cohabitating, 8.3% had a male householder with no partner present, and 19.2% had a female householder with no partner present. The median household size was 2.81 and the median family size was 3.22.

The age distribution was 30.5% under 18, 6.4% from 18 to 24, 23.2% from 25 to 44, 21.9% from 45 to 64, and 18.0% who were 65 or older. The median age was 39.8 years. For every 100 females, there were 87.3 males.

=== Income and poverty ===
The median income for a household was $99,798, with family households having a median income of $114,938 and non-family households $51,875. The per capita income was $39,546. Males working full-time jobs had median earnings of $74,737 compared to $56,071 for females. Out of the 6,183 people with a determined poverty status, 10.5% were below the poverty line. Further, 21.8% of minors and 1.4% of seniors were below the poverty line.

=== Ancestry ===
In the survey, residents self-identified with various ethnic ancestries. People of German descent made up 23.1% of the population of the town, followed by Irish at 12.6%, English at 11.9%, American at 7.3%, French at 3.7%, Italian at 2.7%, Norwegian at 1.9%, Hungarian at 1.5%, Danish at 1.3%, Slovak at 1.3%, Scotch-Irish at 1.1%, Polish at 0.9%, Dutch at 0.9%, Swedish at 0.6%, and Scottish at 0.5%.

== Education ==
It is a part of the Mount Zion Community Unit School District 3.

Mount Zion High School is part of the Mount Zion Unified School District 3, and was founded in 1920. As of 2021, the high school ranks 191st out of Illinois high schools.

Mount Zion is also home to Mount Zion Grade School, Mount Zion Intermediate School, Mount Zion Jr. High School, and McGaughey Elementary School.

== Parks ==
Spitler Woods State Natural Area borders the village to the east. Fort Daniel Conservation Area is a mile further to the east. Fletcher Park, a recreation area, borders the village to the south.

== Notable people ==
- Drew Blickensderfer NASCAR Crew Chief, grew up in Mt. Zion.
- Robert Flider a former Democratic member of the Illinois House of Representatives
