= Frank Watson (American politician) =

American politician

Member of the Illinois Senate from the 51st district
- In office January 12, 1983 – February 16, 2009
- Preceded by: James Donnewald
- Succeeded by: Kyle McCarter

Personal details
- Born: July 26, 1945 (age 81) St. Louis, Missouri, U.S.
- Party: Republican
- Spouse: Susan Watson (née Rasler)
- Children: 2
- Education: Purdue University (B.S.)
- Profession: Pharmacist

Frank Watson (born July 26, 1945) is an American former politician. He was a Republican member of the Illinois Senate, representing the 51st district from 1983 to 2009, and served as Senate Republican Leader before he resigned that position in late 2008 for health reasons. He was Assistant Majority Leader from 1993 to 2002, and previously served as a State Representative from 1979 to 1982.

== Background ==
Watson, a native of Greenville, Illinois, was born July 26, 1945, in St. Louis, Missouri. He graduated from Purdue University with a bachelor's degree in pharmacy in 1968. In 1972, after becoming a registered pharmacist, he purchased his family's business, Watson's Drugstore, in Greenville. The Watson family had been operating the pharmacy in Greenville since 1881. In 2006, the Watsons sold the store. Watson and his wife Susan, a former teacher and business owner, have two children. They live in Greenville, where they grew up, and in West Palm Beach, Florida. Watson began his political career as a township trustee and later the township supervisor for Central Township in Bond County. He also served as a member of the Zoning Board of Appeals for Greenville and as the Bond County coordinator for James R. Thompson in the 1976 Illinois gubernatorial election.

== Illinois General Assembly ==
In the 1978 general election, Watson was elected as one of three representatives to the Illinois House of Representatives from the 55th district, alongside Dwight Friedrich (R-Centralia) and Michael Slape (D-Pocohontas). The 55th district, located in Downstate Illinois, included all of Fayette, Marion, Bond, and Clinton counties and portions of Madison, St. Clair, Jefferson, and Washington counties.

In 1981, Democratic incumbent James Donnewald vacated his Senate seat to run successfully for Illinois Treasurer. In the 1982 general election, Watson defeated Mayor of Trenton and Democratic candidate Herbert Schlarmann.

He became the Illinois Senate's Republican Leader in 2003. As Minority Leader, Watson was reported to often referee the "rancorous" relationship between Senate Democrats and Democratic Governor Rod Blagojevich with the help of House Republican Leader Tom Cross. Watson disagreed with Blagojevich's 2003 plan to mortgage the state's Chicago office building, the James R. Thompson Center, for $200 million over 10 years to raise funds for that year's budget hole. Watson said he was "really troubled by this" and noted other debts the state had taken on that year, such as a $10 billion bond to shore up state pension funds.

=== Retirement ===
In October 2008, Watson suffered a stroke which was reported to be very minor. On November 4, 2008, he sent a letter to the Republican Caucus stating that he would not seek re-election for the Senate Minority Leadership. Watson returned to the Senate for one day in late November, where he was greeted by reporters and House Speaker Michael Madigan. Watson said he was in therapy and anticipated a full recovery.

In February 2009, Watson announced that he would resign his Senate seat effective February 16, 2009; Watson said that due to his stroke, he could not effectively carry out his duties for his district. GOP county chairs of the nine counties that make up Watson's district will vote on a replacement for Watson in the Senate. Watson said: "I've come a long way in my recovery, but have a long way to go. That's not fair to my constituents." Watson's resignation was effective February 16, 2009. On February 21, 2009, the Legislative Committee of the Republican Party of the 51st Legislative District, composed of chairmen of county-level Republican party organizations, appointed Kyle McCarter, a member of the St. Clair County Board to the vacancy.

Illinois House of Representatives
Preceded by Don E. Brummet; Harold D. Byers	Member of the Illinois House of Representatives from the 55th district 1979–1983; Served alongside: Dwight Friedrich, Michael Slape	Succeeded by Penny Pullen
Illinois Senate
Preceded by James Donnewald	Member of the Illinois Senate from the 55th district 1983–2003	Succeeded by Dale Righter
Preceded by Duane Noland	Member of the Illinois Senate from the 51st district 2003–2009	Succeeded by Kyle McCarter
Preceded by Emil Jones	Minority Leader of the Illinois Senate; 2003–2009	Succeeded by Christine Radogno
