= Paul Evans =

Paul Evans may refer to:

== Sportspeople ==
- Paul Evans (Australian footballer) (born 1978), Port Adelaide AFL footballer
- Paul Evans (basketball) (born 1945), American college basketball coach
- Paul Evans (football manager) (born 1949), English football assistant manager and coach and ex goalkeeper
- Paul Evans (footballer, born 1964), English footballer
- Paul Evans (soccer, born 1973), South African football player
- Paul Evans (footballer, born 1974), Welsh football player
- Paul Evans (ice hockey, born 1954), Canadian ice hockey player who played for the Philadelphia Flyers
- Paul Evans (ice hockey, born 1955), Canadian ice hockey player who played for the Toronto Maple Leafs
- Paul Evans (runner) (born 1961), British runner

== Politicians ==
- Paul Evans (Oregon politician) (born 1970), American politician who served in the Oregon House of Representatives
- Paul Evans (Illinois politician) (born 1960), American politician, member of the Illinois House of Representatives
- Paul Evans Aidoo (born 1958), Ghanaian teacher and politician

== Other people ==
- Doc Evans (Paul Wesley Evans, 1907–1977), American jazz musician
- Paul Evans (musician) (born 1938), American rock and roll singer/songwriter
- Paul Evans (poet) (1945–1991), British poet
- Paul Evans (RAF officer) (born 1954), British military officer and medical doctor
- Paul F. Evans (born 1948), American law enforcement officer
- Paul R. Evans (1931–1987), American furniture designer
- Paul A. L. Evans, British professor of organisational behaviour
- Paul Evans, American pastor and radio host of Haven of Rest

== Other uses ==
- Paul Evans (brand), a New York City-based menswear brand

== See also ==
- Evans Paul (born 1955), Haitian politician
