= Pierron, Illinois =

- Village
- Location in Madison County, Illinois
- Coordinates: 38°46′43″N 89°33′33″W
- Country: United States
- State: Illinois
- Counties: Bond, Madison
- Townships: Burgess, Saline
- Founded: 1871
- Incorporated: 1893
- Named for: Jacques Pierron

Area
  - Total: 0.73 sq mi (1.90 km^{2})
  - Land: 0.73 sq mi (1.90 km^{2})
  - Water: 0 sq mi (0.00 km^{2})
- Elevation: 509 ft (155 m)

Population (2020)
  - Total: 459
  - Estimate (2024): 445 ▼
  - Density: 626/sq mi (242/km^{2})
- Time zone: UTC-6 (CST)
  - Summer (DST): UTC-5 (CDT)
- ZIP codes: 62273 (Pierron); 62275 (Pocahontas)
- Area code: 618
- FIPS code: 17-59709
- GNIS feature ID: 2399670

Pierron is a village in Bond and Madison counties, Illinois, United States. The population was 459 at the 2020 census, down from 600 at the 2010 census. The village is part of the St. Louis metropolitan area.

== History ==
The first post office was established at Pierron in 1870. Pierron was laid out as a village in 1871, and named for its founder Jacques Pierron. Pierron was incorporated as a village in 1893.

== Geography ==
Pierron is located in southwestern Bond County and eastern Madison County. The village has two sections that are 4 miles (6 km) apart and connected by Illinois Route 143. The western section, also known as "Pierron Station" and crossed by the CSX Transportation St. Louis Line railroad, is on the Bond–Madison county line, while the eastern section, also known as "Millersburg", is four miles to the east. Highland is 5 miles (8 km) southwest of the western part of Pierron, while Pocahontas is 4 miles (6 km) north of the eastern part.

According to the U.S. Census Bureau, Pierron has a total area of 0.73 square miles (1.89 km^{2}), all land. The western part of the village drains west to Sugar Creek, while the east part drains east to Shoal Creek, both of which are south-flowing tributaries of the Kaskaskia River.

== Demographics ==
Historical population
Census	Pop.	Note	%±
1880	73		—
1900	305		—
1910	417		36.7%
1920	455		9.1%
1930	469		3.1%
1940	349		−25.6%
1950	371		6.3%
1960	451		21.6%
1970	467		3.5%
1980	577		23.6%
1990	554		−4.0%
2000	653		17.9%
2010	600		−8.1%
2020	459		−23.5%
U.S. Decennial Census

As of the 2020 census there were 459 people, 180 households, and 111 families residing in the village. The population density was 625.34 inhabitants per square mile (241.45/km^{2}). There were 232 housing units at an average density of 316.08 per square mile (122.04/km^{2}). The racial makeup of the village was 92.37% White, 0.65% African American, 0.44% Native American, 0.22% Asian, 0.65% from other races, and 5.66% from two or more races. Hispanic or Latino of any race were 1.74% of the population.

There were 180 households, out of which 18.3% had children under the age of 18 living with them, 55.00% were married couples living together, 6.67% had a female householder with no husband present, and 38.33% were non-families. 25.00% of all households were made up of individuals, and 11.11% had someone living alone who was 65 years of age or older. The average household size was 2.66 and the average family size was 2.18.

The village's age distribution consisted of 13.7% under the age of 18, 3.6% from 18 to 24, 24.9% from 25 to 44, 31.9% from 45 to 64, and 26.0% who were 65 years of age or older. The median age was 52.3 years. For every 100 females, there were 110.2 males. For every 100 females age 18 and over, there were 103.0 males.

The median income for a household in the village was $70,313, and the median income for a family was $78,319. Males had a median income of $31,713 versus $18,750 for females. The per capita income for the village was $29,822. About 4.5% of families and 11.3% of the population were below the poverty line, including none of those under age 18 and 13.7% of those age 65 or over.
