= The Hug Company =

Defunct American motor vehicle manufacturer

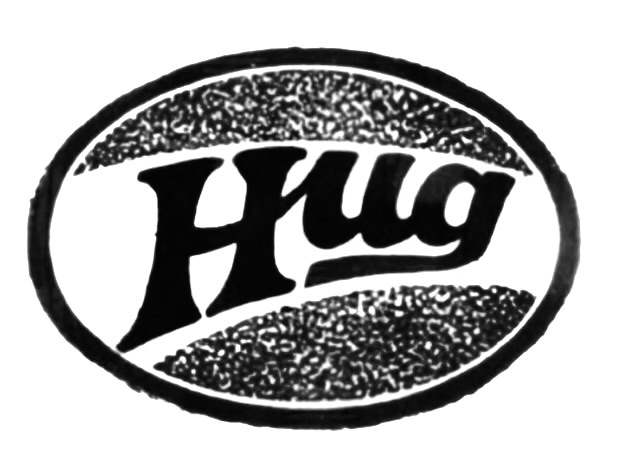
- Type: Truck Company
- Industry: Manufacturing
- Founded: 1921; 105 years ago
- Founder: C. J. Hug
- Defunct: 1942; 84 years ago
- Headquarters: Highland, Illinois, US
- Products: Trucks

The Hug Company of Highland, Illinois, was a truck manufacturer.

== History ==
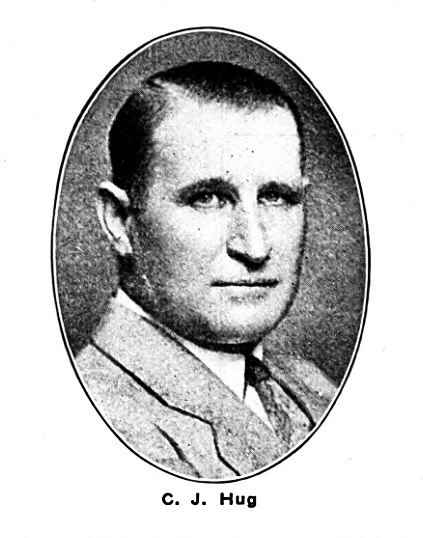
C.J. Hug

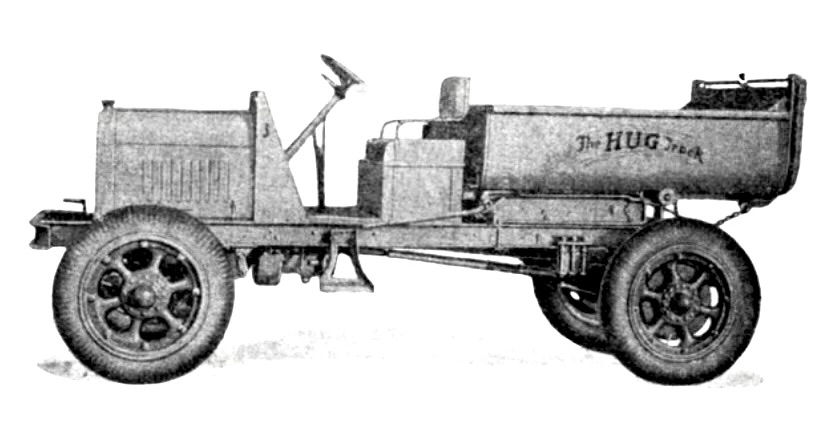
HUG Model HA (1923-1925)

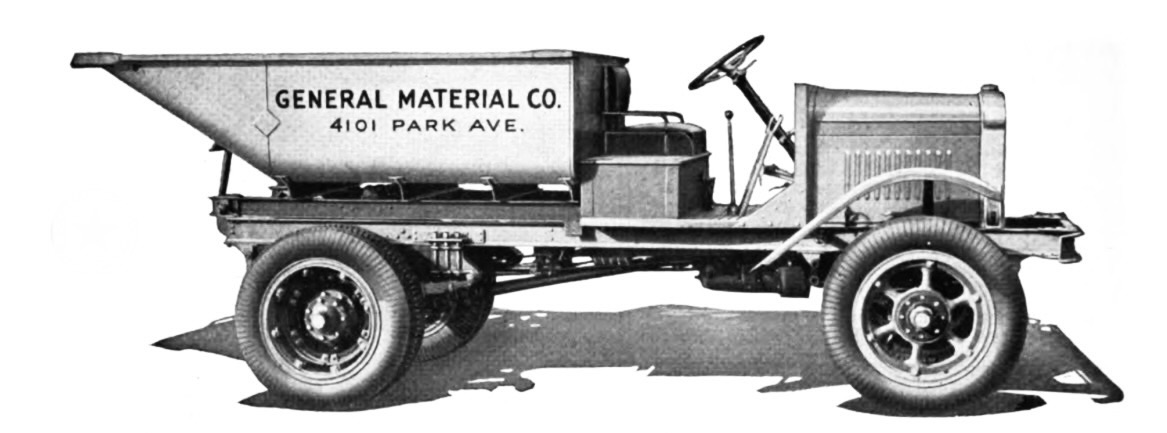
Hug H4K (1926-1927)

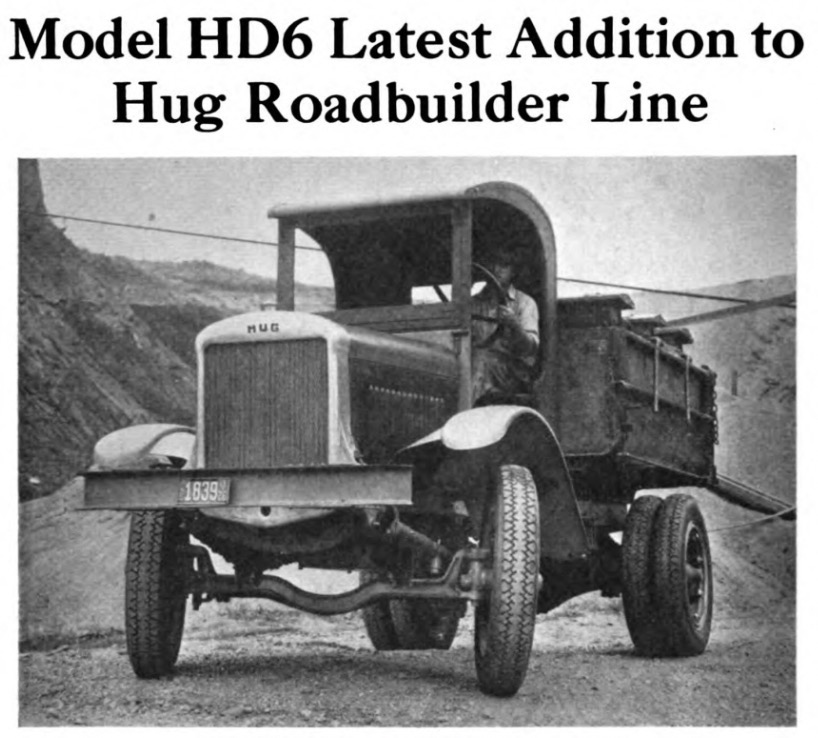
HUG Model HD6 (1926-1927)

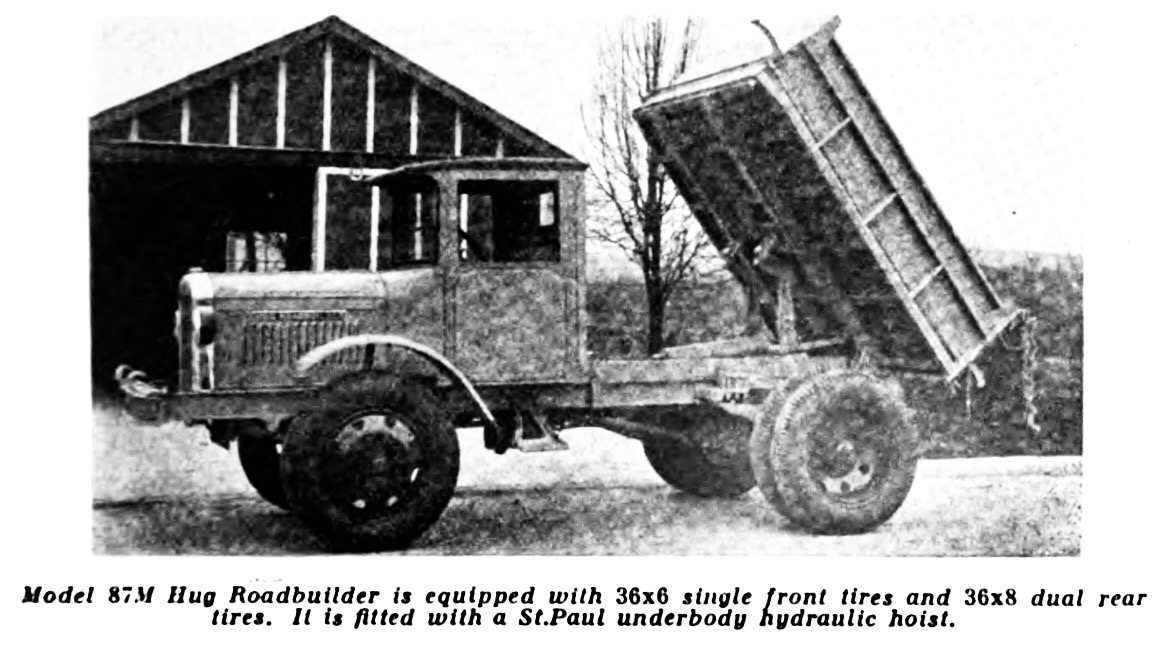
HUG Model 87 (1929-1934)

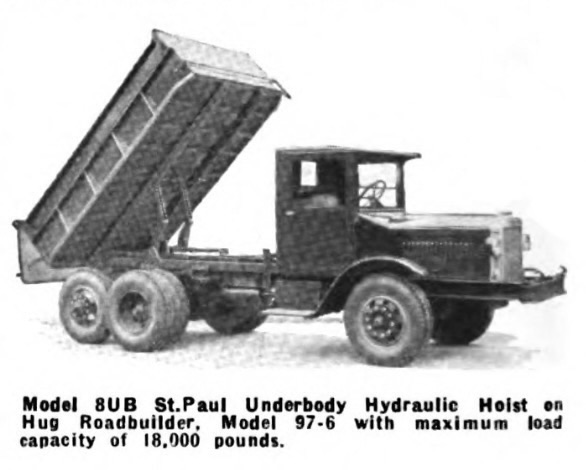
HUG Model 97-6 (1929-1932)

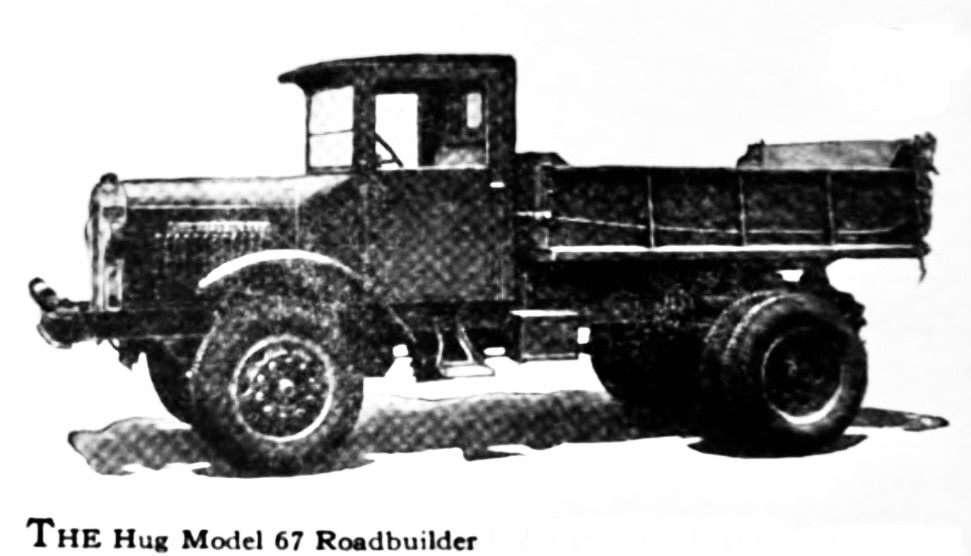
HUG Model 67 (1930-1932)

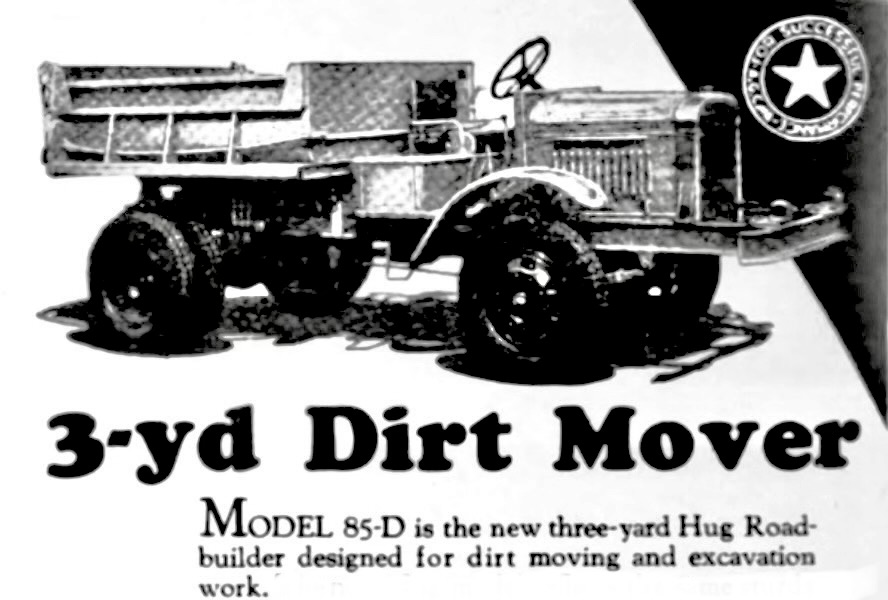
Hug Model D 85 (1930)

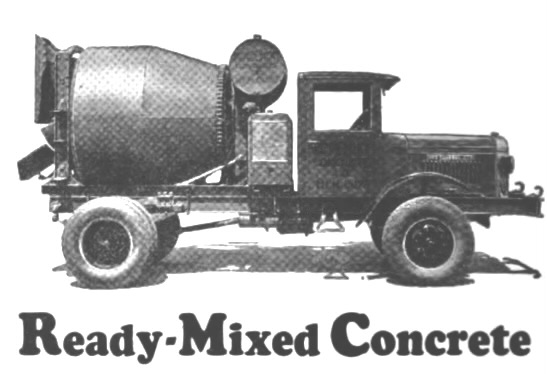
HUG concrete mixer (1930)

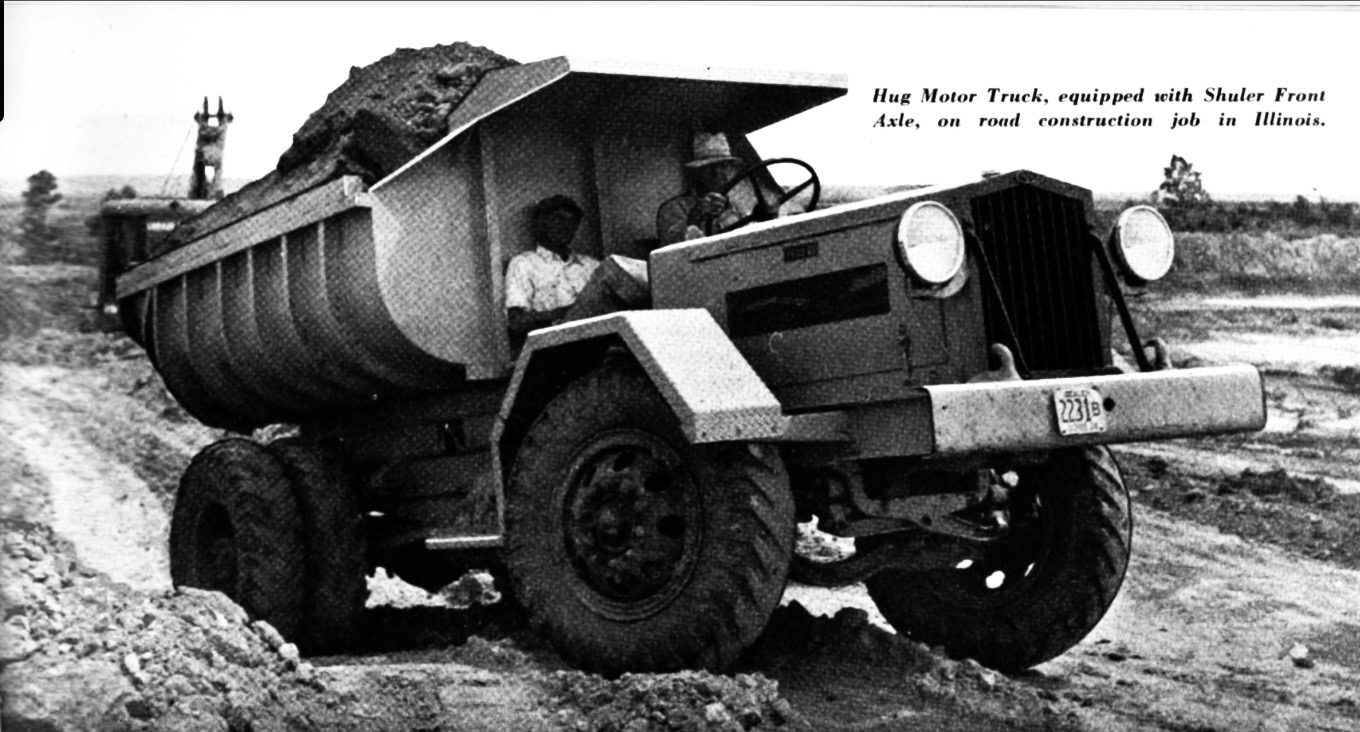
Hug using Shuler front axle (1940)

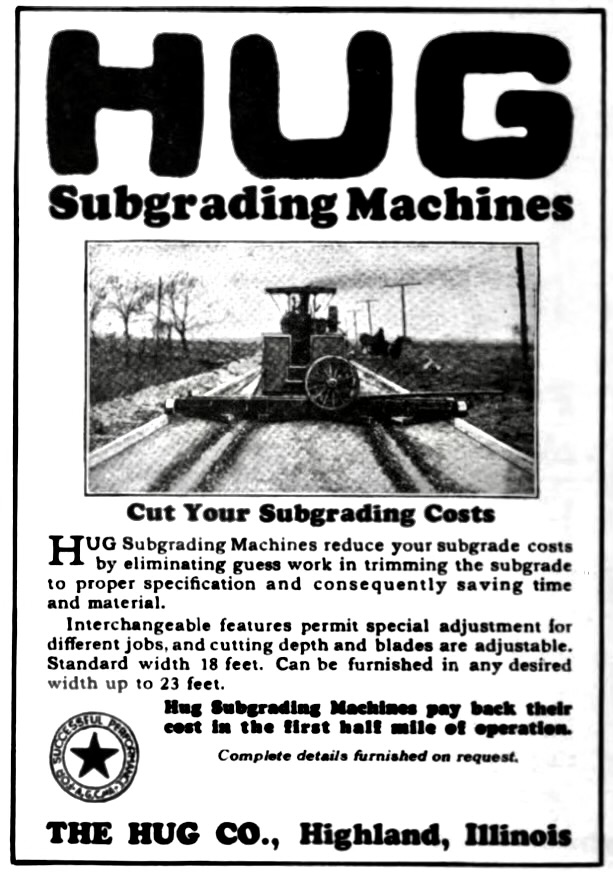
Hug advertisement subgrading machine (1930)

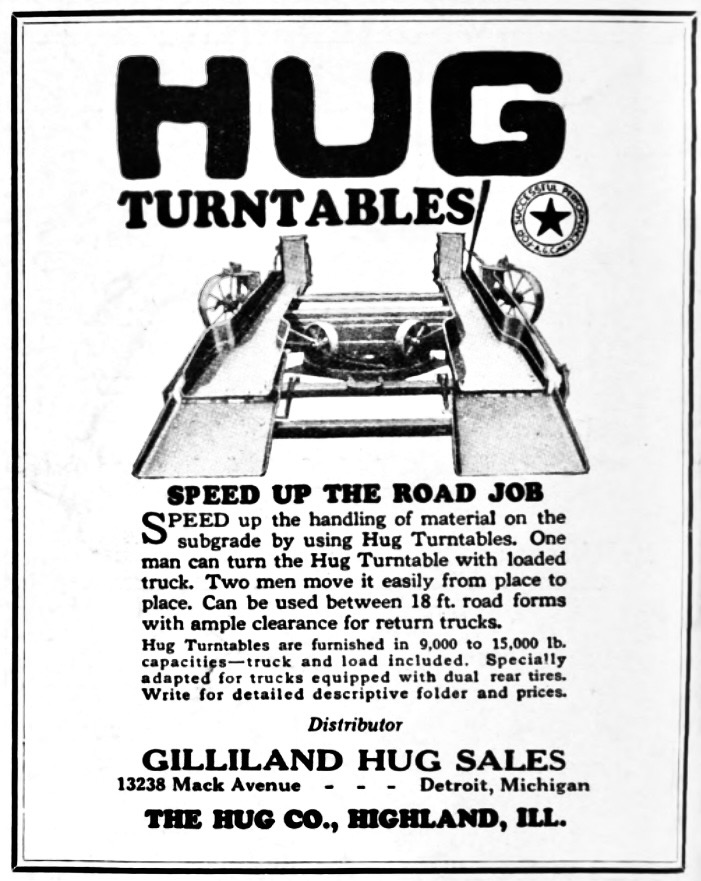
Hug Turntable

C. J. Hug founded the company in Highland, Illinois in 1921. C. J. Hug worked in road construction. In the early 1920s, Hug was contracted to pave the National Road, from Pocahontas, Ill., to Troy, Ill. Since he wasn't happy with the trucks available on the market, he designed his own products. When diesel engines for trucks appeared, Hug relied on diesel engines from Cummins. Hug was a manufacturer that made assembly trucks. He bought components available on the market in order to market his trucks cost-effectively. Examples are Shuler axles or Cummins diesel engines. An innovation from Hug was the innovative turntables that allowed trucks to be turned on steel plates on very narrow streets. Some of Hug's major customers included the Homeseekers real estate firm in Hollywood, Florida, which had purchased 50 vehicles by 1926. The Southern Material and Construction Company purchased its first Hug truck in March 1923. By 1926, they were operating 60 of them. In the fall of 1924, the Cleveland Trinidad Paving Company purchased 15 Hug trucks for use in Cleveland. The company’s own Hug fleet comprised a total of 64 vehicles. In 1942, a few vehicles were still produced as six-wheelers. Waukesha Engines were used as gasoline engines, and Cummins as diesel engines. Production ended on June 10, 1942. A total of 3,964 vehicles were made.

== Production models ==
The pre-assigned serial numbers only indicate the maximum possible production quantity.

Year	Production figures	Model	Load capacity	Serial number
1921			to	
			to	
			to	
			to	
1922		T	1,5 to	
		C	1,5 to	
1923		T	1,5 to	99000 to
		C	1,5 to	100000 to
		H	2 to	
		HA	2 to	
1924		T	1,5 to	220 to
		HA	2 to	205 to
		H4	2,5 to	289 to
1925		T	1,5 to	220 to
		HA	2 to	205 to
		H4	2,5 to	289 to
1926		HA4	2,5 to	
		CHA4	2,5 to	
		H4K	3,75 to	
		CHK4	3,75 to	
		CHK	3,75 to	
		HD	3,5 to	1142 to
		CHD	3,5 to	
1927		20	2 to	
		HA4	3 to	
		CHA	3 to	
		30	3 to	
	~50	HK4	4 to	
		CHK	4 to	
		40	4 to	
		HD	5 to	
		CHD	5 to	
1928		22	2 to	
		60	2 to	
		26	2,5 to	
		81	2,5 to	
		84	2,5 to	
		66	2,5 to	
		40	3 to	
		86	3 to	
		486	3,5 to	
1929		26	2,5 to	2145 to
		40	3 to	
		486	3,5 to	
		41	3 to	
		86	3 to	2145 to
		87	3,5 to	
		90	3,5 to	
		96	5 to	
		81	2,5 to	
		84	2,5 to	
		66	2,5 to	
		22	2 to	
		60	2 to	
1930		67	3 to	
		D 85	to	
1931		67	3 to	
		60	2 to	
		D 85	to	
		87M	to	
		97-6	8 to	
1932		67	3 to	
1933			to	
1934			to	
1935			to	
1936			to	
1937			to	
1938		42	to	
		D 42	to	
		43	to	
		D 43	to	
		HC	to	
		70 K	to	
		87 Q	to	
		D 87 Q	to	
		92 U	to	
		16	to	
		98	to	
		D 98	to	
		30	to	
1939		98-CD	to	
		98-MB	to	
		99-MA	to	
1940			to	
1941			to	
1942		99	to	
		D 99	to	
		99 S	to	
		D 99 S	to	
Sum	3,964			
