= Ron Stephens =

Ron Stephens may refer to:

- Ron Stephens (Illinois politician) (born 1948), member of the Illinois House of Representatives
- Ron Stephens (Georgia politician) (born 1954), member of the Georgia House of Representatives
