= Kurt M. Granberg =

American politician (born 1953)

Member of the Illinois House of Representatives from the 107th district
- In office January 1987 – January 2009
- Preceded by: Dwight Friedrich
- Succeeded by: John Cavaletto

Personal details
- Born: June 16, 1953 (age 73) Breese, Illinois
- Party: Democratic
- Education: Chicago-Kent College of Law; University of Illinois
- Profession: Attorney

Kurt M. Granberg was a Democratic member of the Illinois House of Representatives, representing the 107th District from 1987 until his retirement at the end of his term in January 2009.

Granberg was born on June 16, 1953, in Breese, Illinois. He attended the University of Illinois at Urbana–Champaign and the Chicago-Kent College of Law. Between 1976 and 1977, Granberg worked as a staffer in the Illinois House of Representatives. Granberg, an attorney, served as a member of the Clinton County Board and was a law partner of James Donnewald. Granberg was first elected to the Illinois House of Representatives in 1986 after defeating Republican incumbent Dwight Friedrich. He was the only freshman Democrat from Downstate Illinois that year. His legislative agenda includes a constitutional amendment to force the legislature to follow the State Mandates Act and provide money for programs they force on local governments. He favored limiting campaign contributions from political action committees, because of his belief that the money stimulates negative campaigns which turn off voters.

After the 2001 redistricting, Granberg's district was renumbered from the 109th district to the 107th. The 107th was in the same area as previous districts and was composed of Clinton County, Illinois (except for St. Rose and Wheatfield townships), Jefferson County, Marion County and Pope Township in Fayette County.

In 2008, Granberg chose not to run for re-election and was succeeded by retired educator John Cavaletto.
