= Highland, Illinois =

- City
- Flag

- Location in Madison County, Illinois
- Coordinates: 38°45′05″N 89°40′56″W
- Country: United States
- State: Illinois
- County: Madison
- Townships: Helvetia, Saline, Marine

Area
  - Total: 7.84 sq mi (20.31 km^{2})
  - Land: 6.81 sq mi (17.65 km^{2})
  - Water: 1.03 sq mi (2.67 km^{2})
- Elevation: 551 ft (168 m)

Population (2020)
  - Total: 9,991
  - Density: 1,466.2/sq mi (566.12/km^{2})
- Time zone: UTC-6 (CST)
  - Summer (DST): UTC-5 (CDT)
- ZIP code: 62249
- Area code: 618
- FIPS code: 17-34670
- GNIS feature ID: 2394375
- Website: www.highlandil.gov

Highland is a city in Madison County, Illinois, United States. The population was 9,991 at the 2020 census. Highland began as a Swiss settlement and derived its name from later German immigrants

Highland is a sister city of Sursee in Switzerland.

Highland is a part of the Metro East region of the Greater St. Louis metropolitan area.

== History ==
Highland was settled in the early 19th century by Swiss-German settlers. The town was founded in 1837 and celebrated its 175th Jubilee in 2012. It was first named Helvetia (pronounced "hellveesha") in accordance with the heritage of the town's Swiss-German founding members. The town voted to change its name to the English version, "Highland", in the early 20th century, as well as stopping production of its German language newspaper, in part to avoid negativity toward those of Germanic heritage at the advent of the First World War. Around the same time, a small town in northern Illinois also started calling itself Highland. Eventually, the town in northern Illinois became Highland Park.

Highland has a rich history including extended visits by such notables as Abraham Lincoln. On November 21, 1915, the Liberty Bell passed through Highland on its nationwide tour returning to Pennsylvania from the Panama–Pacific International Exposition in San Francisco.

== Geography ==
Highland is in southeastern Madison County, 30 miles (48 km) east of St. Louis. U.S. Route 40 passes through the city north of downtown, leading west 11 miles (18 km) to Troy and on to St. Louis, and to the northeast 20 miles (32 km) to Greenville. Illinois Route 160 passes through the center of Highland, leading north 6 miles (10 km) to Grantfork and south 10 miles (16 km) to Trenton, while Illinois Route 143 leads northwest 6 miles (10 km) to Marine and northeast 5 miles (8 km) to Pierron. Interstate 70 passes through the northern part of the city limits, with access from Exit 24 (IL 143) to the west and Exit 30 (US 40) to the east.

According to the 2021 census gazetteer files, Highland has a total area of 7.83 square miles (20.28 km^{2}), of which 6.80 square miles (17.61 km^{2}) (or 86.85%) is land and 1.03 square miles (2.67 km^{2}) (or 13.15%) is water. The city drains to the south to Sugar Creek, a tributary of the Kaskaskia River, and to the northwest to the East Fork of Silver Creek, another tributary of the Kaskaskia. Highland Silver Lake is a reservoir constructed on the East Fork; the Highland city limits extend north 5 miles (8 km) to the southern border of Grantfork to enclose the entire lake.

=== Climate ===
Climate data for Highland, Illinois
| Month | Jan | Feb | Mar | Apr | May | Jun | Jul | Aug | Sep | Oct | Nov | Dec | Year |
|---|---|---|---|---|---|---|---|---|---|---|---|---|---|
| Average precipitation inches (mm) | 2.74 (70) | 2.45 (62) | 3.43 (87) | 4.95 (126) | 5.18 (132) | 4.50 (114) | 4.36 (111) | 3.81 (97) | 3.34 (85) | 3.39 (86) | 3.64 (92) | 2.76 (70) | 44.55 (1,132) |
| Average snowfall inches (cm) | 3.9 (9.9) | 2.0 (5.1) | 1.0 (2.5) | 0.0 (0.0) | 0.0 (0.0) | 0.0 (0.0) | 0.0 (0.0) | 0.0 (0.0) | 0.0 (0.0) | 0.0 (0.0) | 0.4 (1.0) | 2.9 (7.4) | 10.2 (25.9) |
| Average precipitation days (≥ 0.01 in) | 7.8 | 7.7 | 9.9 | 10.7 | 12 | 9.3 | 8.2 | 7.4 | 7 | 7.5 | 8 | 7.8 | 103.3 |
| Average snowy days (≥ 0.01 in) | 2.8 | 1.9 | 0.7 | 0 | 0 | 0 | 0 | 0 | 0 | 0 | 0.4 | 1.8 | 7.6 |
Source: NOAA

== Economy ==
Highland has been home to businesses that include Pet Milk and the Wicks Organ Company. For the past 60 years, Highland Supply Corporation has been producing and selling floral grass, a traditional decorative product used to line Easter baskets. Highland is also home to The Korte Company (builder of many large and well-known buildings including Universal Studios in Florida).

== Government ==
Highland is in the process of implementing citywide availability of a municipal broadband network using Fiber to the home technology.

== Education ==
The Highland Community Unit School District 5 serves Highland area students including those from Alhambra, Illinois, Grantfork, Illinois, and New Douglas, Illinois. Kindergarten through sixth grade schools are located in each of the districts municipalities while the district's middle and high schools are located in Highland. Starting in August 2014 6th grade is located at the Highland Middle School. In September 2014, the district's teachers staged a strike for the first time in the district's history.

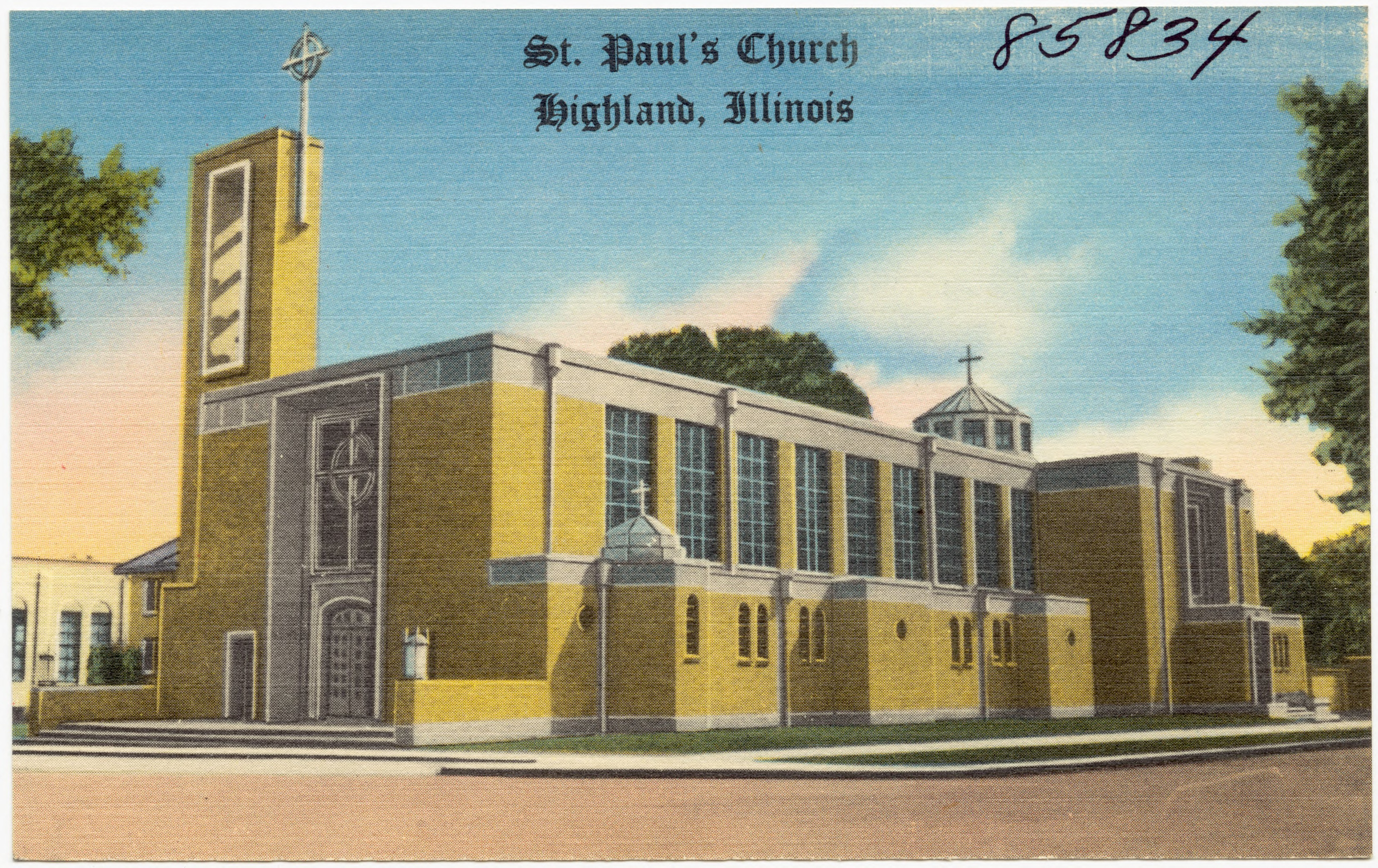
St. Paul's Church on a postcard

Additionally, Highland has a local parochial school named St. Paul Catholic School offering Kindergarten through eighth grade education.

The Louis Latzer Memorial Public Library has a collection of more than 48,000 print volumes, a substantial media collection, and public computer access along with access to subscription databases and a genealogy collection. It is also a member of the Illinois Heartland Library System.

== Demographics ==
Historical population
| Census | Pop. | Note | %± |
|---|---|---|---|
| 1850 | 704 | | — |
| 1870 | 1,757 | | — |
| 1880 | 1,969 | | 12.1% |
| 1890 | 1,857 | | −5.7% |
| 1900 | 1,970 | | 6.1% |
| 1910 | 2,675 | | 35.8% |
| 1920 | 2,902 | | 8.5% |
| 1930 | 3,319 | | 14.4% |
| 1940 | 3,820 | | 15.1% |
| 1950 | 4,283 | | 12.1% |
| 1960 | 4,943 | | 15.4% |
| 1970 | 5,981 | | 21.0% |
| 1980 | 7,122 | | 19.1% |
| 1990 | 7,525 | | 5.7% |
| 2000 | 8,438 | | 12.1% |
| 2010 | 9,919 | | 17.6% |
| 2020 | 9,991 | | 0.7% |
U.S. Decennial Census

As of the 2020 census there were 9,991 people, 4,403 households, and 2,700 families residing in the city. The population density was 1,275.50 inhabitants per square mile (492.47/km^{2}). There were 4,542 housing units at an average density of 579.85 per square mile (223.88/km^{2}). Of these 4,542 housing units, 6.3% were vacant. The homeowner vacancy rate was 1.6% and the rental vacancy rate was 6.6%. The racial makeup of the city was 93.13% White, 0.43% African American, 0.24% Native American, 1.01% Asian, 0.00% Pacific Islander, 0.42% from other races, and 4.76% from two or more races. Hispanic or Latino of any race were 1.84% of the population.

There were 4,403 households, out of which 28.6% had children under the age of 18 living with them, 46.60% were married couples living together, 10.04% had a female householder with no husband present, and 38.68% were non-families. 31.48% of all households were made up of individuals, and 14.88% had someone living alone who was 65 years of age or older. The average household size was 2.87 and the average family size was 2.27.

The city's age distribution consisted of 21.2% under the age of 18, 6.6% from 18 to 24, 29.1% from 25 to 44, 24.4% from 45 to 64, and 18.8% who were 65 years of age or older. The median age was 39.5 years. For every 100 females, there were 98.1 males. For every 100 females age 18 and over, there were 91.8 males.

The median income for a household in the city was $64,332, and the median income for a family was $82,990. Males had a median income of $51,467 versus $33,531 for females. The per capita income for the city was $33,027. About 4.8% of families and 7.6% of the population were below the poverty line, including 14.2% of those under age 18 and 4.7% of those age 65 or over.

Racial composition as of the 2020 census
| Race | Number | Percent |
|---|---|---|
| White | 9,305 | 93.1% |
| Black or African American | 43 | 0.4% |
| American Indian and Alaska Native | 24 | 0.2% |
| Asian | 101 | 1.0% |
| Native Hawaiian and Other Pacific Islander | 0 | 0.0% |
| Some other race | 42 | 0.4% |
| Two or more races | 476 | 4.8% |
| Hispanic or Latino (of any race) | 184 | 1.8% |

== Mentions in popular media ==
Highland is the setting for the first song on the Illinois album by Sufjan Stevens, titled 'Concerning the UFO sighting near Highland, Illinois', in which Stevens mentions a 21st-century UFO sighting by the owner of the local mini-golf course.

Highland was also mentioned on The Daily Show on February 9, 2006. A report mentioned local pharmacist and state legislator Ron Stephens, who protested an executive order by Illinois Governor Rod Blagojevich requiring a pharmacist to fill emergency contraception prescriptions.

== Notable people ==
- Geoff Hartlieb, pitcher for the Miami Marlins; attended Highland High School
- James Head, mixed martial artist in the Ultimate Fighting Championship
- Steve Hug, member of the 1972 Olympic team in gymnastics
- Arlo U. Landolt, astronomer
- Sam LaPorta, football player for the Detroit Lions
- Ken Oberkfell, third baseman with six teams; World Series champion (1982); born in Highland
- Jake Odorizzi, Major League Baseball pitcher; previously played for Highland High School
- Harry Parker, pitcher for various teams; born in Highland
- Aaron Rakers, relief pitcher for two teams; born in Highland
- Donald Weder, businessman holding 1,397 U.S. patents, including the hinged plastic Easter egg, a process for making plastic Easter grass, and decorative florist foil packaging

== See also ==
- Journey to New Switzerland
