= Ron Stephens (Illinois politician) =

American politician (born 1948)

Member of the Illinois House of Representatives from the 110th district 102nd district (2003-2011)
- In office January 1993 – August 2011
- Preceded by: Jay Hoffman (redistricted)
- Succeeded by: Paul Evans
- In office January 1985 – January 1991
- Preceded by: Michael Slape
- Succeeded by: Jay Hoffman

Personal details
- Born: February 19, 1948 (age 78) East St. Louis, Illinois
- Party: Republican
- Education: St. Louis College of Pharmacy (B.S.)
- Profession: Pharmacist

Ron Stephens (born 1948) is a former Republican member of the Illinois House of Representatives, representing the 102nd district from 1985 to 1991, and from 1993 until 2011 when he announced his retirement. The district includes portions of Bond County, Madison County, Effingham County, Fayette County and St. Clair County. He was the Assistant Republican Leader in the state House until his retirement.

He and his wife Lisa have nine children between them and live in Greenville, Illinois. Stephens is a licensed pharmacist and co-owns two pharmacies.

== Early life and career ==
Stephens was born February 19, 1948, in East St. Louis, Illinois. He served in the U.S. armed forces during the Vietnam War. He was awarded a Purple Heart and a Bronze Star Medal. He earned a Bachelor of Science from St. Louis College of Pharmacy and became a pharmacist.

== Illinois House of Representatives ==
In 1982, Stephens, then of Caseyville, ran against Democratic incumbent Michael Slape of Pocahontas for the Illinois House of Representatives in the 110th district. In a 1984 rematch, Stephens defeated Slape and defended his seat from Slape in a 1986 rematch. In 1988, Stephens defeated Democratic candidate Jay Hoffman by approximately 1,500 votes before losing to him in a 1990 rematch. After the loss to Hoffman, Governor Jim Edgar named Stephens the Head of the Illinois Emergency Services and Disaster Agency where he served until he chose to once again run for the Illinois House of Representatives after the 1991 decennial redistricting. He defeated Robert Daiber, a farmer from Marine, in the newly drawn 110th district by 259 votes.

During his legislative tenure, Stephens served as a member of the Central Committee of the Illinois Republican Party elected by Republicans from what was then Illinois's 21st congressional district.

On May 12, 2010, State Representative Stephens pled guilty to DUI and was sentenced to 12 months' supervision and his drivers license was suspended. He had already been put on probation due to a previous conviction for using controlled substances in 2001. Stephens announced his retirement on August 2, 2011, saying that a newly redistricted map was a factor in his choice. The new map "made the decision a little easier," said Stephens. "I could run against Cavaletto, or run in the new district. Neither of those choices was palatable." By resigning before his term expires, Stephens made it possible for local Republican County Chairmen to pick a replacement, who could then run as an incumbent for the 2012 election. On August 13, 2011, it was announced that Paul Evans would replace Stephens.

=== Political positions ===
Stephens was critical of the Democratic majority leadership in the state and the General Assembly during the 2007 budget crisis: "You had everything that the political world could give you, and you have squandered it. You have squandered it at taxpayers' expense. Democrats, with all the power the people could give them, have failed the people of Illinois."

Stephens has opposed the electric rate relief package proposed by the General Assembly as not giving customers enough money back from Ameren. Stephens said, "This supposed 'rate relief' package will only give back seven or eight dollars a month to Ameren customers who have seen their electric bills go up by hundreds of dollars a month. Who are they kidding? This legislation is disgraceful."

After a recent DUI arrest, coupled with previous discipline for the abuse of controlled substances, Stephens faced revocation of his pharmacist license. He pleaded guilty to DUI in July 2010 and because of his past habitual drug use, agreed to monthly drug tests. His pharmacy license is on "indefinite" probation, for a minimum of one year.

On November 30, 2010, while the politician was still being subjected to monthly drug tests, Ron Stephens was one of the biggest opponents of and voted against the proposed medical marijuana bill in Illinois. The bill narrowly failed passing. Stephens was quoted as saying "This should be called the marijuana possession law ... It doesn't restrict the use in any one way."

That same week, Stephens was a vocal opponent of the Illinois Civil Unions bill, which passed despite his opposition. He said civil unions were a "slippery slope" and "just call me an old-fashioned traditionalist" going on to say that it will lead to society crumbling and failing.

=== Comments regarding Governor Blagojevich ===
After Illinois Governor Rod Blagojevich paid for a $600 makeup tab with public funds, Stephens asked the House Speaker Michael Madigan before recess on a Friday when the "Gubernatorial Cosmetology Committee" would be meeting.

In October 2008, Stephens was interviewed by the Associated Press regarding Blagojevich's executive order implementing FamilyCare, an expansion of the healthcare system that never gained the General Assembly's approval and was declared unconstitutional by two courts. After state departments sent pharmacies that had participated in the program notices that they would not be paid for the services rendered under the program, Stephens told the AP that Blagojevich should pay for the prescription drugs out of his own private accounts.

=== The Daily Show appearance ===
In early February 2006, Stephens challenged Blagojevich in an appearance on The Daily Show to discuss the Governor's executive order that pharmacists must dispense any drugs for which a customer had a valid prescription, including birth control pills and Plan B. Blagojevich was interviewed by Jason Jones, who repeatedly pretended to be unable to pronounce Blagojevich and simply called him "Governor Smith". This prompted Blagojevich to turn to the camera and ask "Is he teasing me or is that legit?" Two weeks after the interview, Blagojevich admitted that he was unaware of the nature of the show. Stephens said he knew beforehand that the show was a comedy show: "I thought the governor was hip enough that he would have known that, too."

Stephens later said, "With all due respect to the governor, he knew it was a comedy show. It's general knowledge for people under 90 years of age. It was when he came off looking so silly that he said he thought it was a regular news program. Even assuming he didn't know about it beforehand, we had to sign a release before the interview."
