= Michael Slape =

American politician

Michael E. “Mike" Slape (June 20, 1948) is an American politician who served as a Democratic member of the Illinois House of Representatives from 1979 to 1985.

Slape was born June 20, 1948. He attended high school at East St. Louis High School. He attended Greenville College and became a realtor working in Greenville, Illinois. He served in the United States Army for a time. He was elected to the Illinois House in 1978. Prior to this election to the Illinois House of Representatives, he served as the Tax Assessor for Burgess Township, Chairman of the Bond County Democratic Party, and as an aide to House Majority Whip Don E. Brummet. In the 1984 general election, Slape lost reelection to Ron Stephens. Slape lost a rematch to Stephens in the 1986 general election.
