= John Cavaletto =

American politician

Member of the Illinois House of Representatives from the 107th district
- In office January 14, 2009 – January 9, 2019
- Preceded by: Kurt Granberg
- Succeeded by: Blaine Wilhour

Personal details
- Born: June 8, 1940 (age 86) Centenary, Indiana
- Party: Republican
- Spouse: Connie
- Education: Southern Illinois University
- Profession: Retired school principal and basketball coach

John D. Cavaletto (born June 8, 1940) is a former Republican member of the Illinois House of Representatives, representing the 107th District since his election in 2008. On September 18, 2017, Cavaletto announced he would not be seeking reelection in 2018. He was succeeded by Republican Blaine Wilhour.

== Biography ==
John D. Cavaletto was born June 8, 1940, in Centenary, Indiana. From a family of immigrant coal miners, he was raised in Sesser, Illinois. A congratulatory resolution passed by the Illinois House of Representatives recounts that, at age he and his future wife, Connie, obtained their social security cards together so they could go to work at the summer camp for disabled children at Giant City State Park in Carbondale. After many years of developing programs for special needs people, his summer programs became the model for the Kennedy Foundation and its program that would become the Special Olympics movement. After graduating from Sesser High School, Cavaletto went on to earn his bachelor's and master's degrees in education at Southern Illinois University at Carbondale. He received his Administrative Endorsement from Eastern Illinois University.

John became a teacher and basketball coach—taking the Breese Mater Dei High School basketball team to the Illinois State Championships and leading that team to 4th Place in the very competitive big schools division of Illinois in 1974. He became the principal of Salem Community High School and retired from there in 2001.

== Political career ==
Cavaletto challenged Democratic incumbent Kurt Granberg in the 2002 general election and in the 2006 general election to represent the 107th district in the Illinois House of Representatives. The 107th district included all of Jefferson and Marion counties and portions of Clinton and Fayette counties. In the latter campaign, Cavaletto came within 126 votes of defeating Granberg. After Granberg declined to run for reelection in 2008, Caveletto defeated Democratic candidate and Marion County Treasurer Patti Hahn for the seat. He was sworn into office on January 14, 2009.

As a result of the 2011 redistricting process, Caveletto's 107th district was redrawn to add Bond County and portions of Effingham County and to remove Jefferson County.

Representative Cavaletto served on the Appropriations – Public Safety Committee, Counties and Townships Committee, Elementary & Secondary Education: School Curriculum & Policies Committee, Transportation, Regulation Roads & Bridges Committee and serves as the Minority Spokesperson for both the newly created Special Needs Services Committee and the Small Business Empowerment & Workforce Development Committee. He has also served on the Agriculture & Conservation Committee and the Cities & Villages Committee.

The recipient of the "Legislator of the Year" Award from the Illinois Association of Fire Protection Districts, Mr. Cavaletto has also been awarded the Illinois Farm Bureau's ACTIVATOR Award as a "Friend of Agriculture" each legislative session of his service.
