= Charles Meier =

American politician

Charles "Charlie" Meier
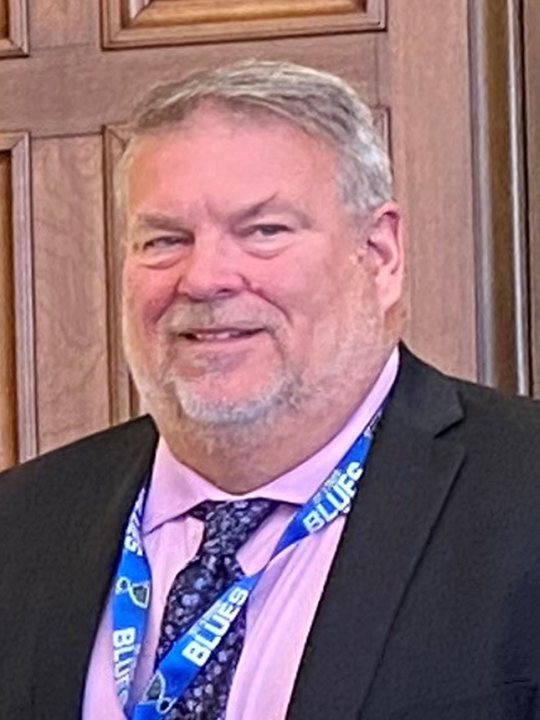
- Meier in 2023

Member of the Illinois House of Representatives from the 109th district
- Incumbent
- Assumed office 2023
- Preceded by: Adam Niemerg

Member of the Illinois House of Representatives from the 108th district
- In office 2013–2023
- Preceded by: Paul Evans (Illinois politician)
- Succeeded by: Wayne Rosenthal

Personal details
- Born: Okawville, Illinois, U.S.
- Party: Republican
- Profession: Real Estate Developer; Farmer
- Website: https://charliemeier.net

Charles "Charlie" Meier is a member of the Illinois House of Representatives as a representative for the 109th district. This district includes parts of Bond, Clinton, Madison, St. Clair, and Washington counties in Southern Illinois.

== Early life and career ==
Charles Meier served 5 years on the Washington County Board prior to his election to the state house.

== Illinois House ==
In the 2012 primary election, Meier ran for election in the 108th district, as redrawn by the 2011 decennial reapportionment. In the primary, he defeated Paul Evans, who represented the 102nd district, but ran for election in the 108th district. He was then elected in the 2012 general election.

As of May 7, 2024, Representative Meier is a member of the following Illinois House committees:

- Agriculture & Conservation Committee (HAGC)
- Appropriations - Health & Human Services Committee (HAPH)
- Energy & Environment Committee (HENG)
- Human Services Committee (HHSV)
- Medicaid Subcommittee (HHSV-HHSM)

== Electoral History ==
Illinois 108th State House District Republican Primary 2012
Party	Candidate	Votes	%
Republican	Charles Meier	4,391	38.32
Republican	Paul Evans (Illinois politician) (incumbent)	3,735	32.60
Republican	Don W. Weber	3,332	29.08
Total votes		11,458	100.0

Illinois 108th State House District General Election 2012
Party	Candidate	Votes	%
Republican	Charles Meier	33,552	66.65
Democratic	Daniel P. Polites	16,786	33.35
Total votes		50,338	100.0

Illinois 108th State House District Republican Primary 2014
Party	Candidate	Votes	%
Republican	Charles Meier	7,820	100
Total votes		7,820	100.0

Illinois 108th State House District General Election 2014
Party	Candidate	Votes	%
Republican	Charles Meier	32,836	100
Total votes		32,836	100.0

Illinois 108th State House District Republican Primary 2016
Party	Candidate	Votes	%
Republican	Charles Meier	15,599	100
Total votes		15,599	100.0

Illinois 108th State House District General Election 2016
Party	Candidate	Votes	%
Republican	Charles Meier	48,339	100
Total votes		48,339	100.0

Illinois 108th State House District Republican Primary 2018
Party	Candidate	Votes	%
Republican	Charles Meier	9,096	71.57
Republican	Don Moore	3,614	28.43
Total votes		12,710	100.0

Illinois 108th State House District General Election 2018
Party	Candidate	Votes	%
Republican	Charles Meier	38,987	100
Total votes		38,987	100.0

Illinois 108th State House District Republican Primary 2020
Party	Candidate	Votes	%
Republican	Charles Meier	9,834	100
Total votes		9,834	100.0

Illinois 108th State House District General Election 2020
Party	Candidate	Votes	%
Republican	Charles Meier	45,603	73.83
Democratic	Kacie Weicherding	16,161	26.17
Total votes		61,764	100.0

Illinois 109th State House District Republican Primary 2022
Party	Candidate	Votes	%
Republican	Charles Meier	11,905	100
Total votes		11,905	100.0

Illinois 109th State House District General Election 2022
Party	Candidate	Votes	%
Republican	Charles Meier	39,792	100
Total votes		39,792	100.0

Illinois 109th State House District Republican Primary 2024
Party	Candidate	Votes	%
Republican	Charles Meier	10,051	100
Total votes		10,051	100.0

Illinois 109th State House District General Election 2024
Party	Candidate	Votes	%
Republican	Charles Meier	51,851	100
Total votes		51,851	100.0

Illinois 109th State House District Republican Primary 2026
Party	Candidate	Votes	%
Republican	Charles Meier	7,600	62.33
Republican	Zachary Meyer	4,594	37.67
Total votes		12,194	100.0
