= Blaine Wilhour =

American politician

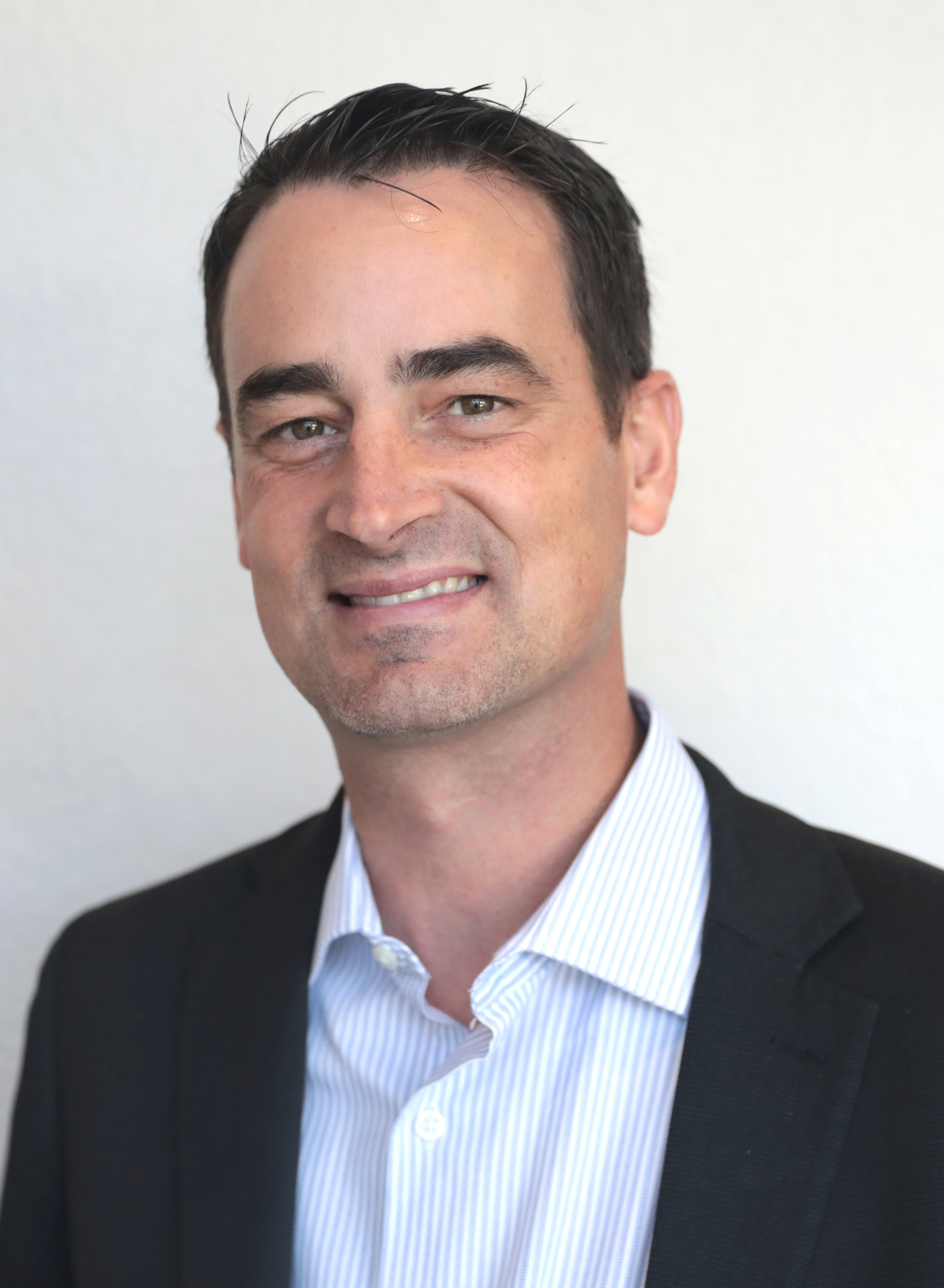

Member of the Illinois House of Representatives from the 107th district
- Incumbent
- Assumed office January 9, 2019
- Preceded by: John Cavaletto

Personal details
- Born: March 10, 1982 (age 44) Beecher City, Illinois, U.S.
- Party: Republican

Blaine Wilhour is a Republican member of the Illinois House of Representatives from the 110th district for the 103rd General Assembly. The district, located in South Central Illinois, includes all or portions of Bond, Clay, Clinton, Effingham, Fayette, Marion, Montgomery, and Richland counties.

Wilhour, of Beecher City, defeated David J. Seiler, a history teacher at Lake Land College, in the 2018 general election. He is a past member of the Fayette County Board and veteran of the Illinois Army National Guard. He works at his family's construction company and its farm.

In the aftermath of the storming of the Capitol by a mob of Trump supporters, Wilhour condemned the violence and the rioters but expressed sympathy with the reason for the protests. Wilhour supported Congresswoman Mary Miller's objections to certifying Joe Biden's electoral victory, claiming there were "irregularities" in the 2020 election.

As of January 13, 2023, Representative Wilhour is a member of the following Illinois House committees during the 103rd General Assembly:

- Appropriations - Elementary & Secondary Education Committee (HAPE); Republican Spokesperson
- Elementary & Secondary Education: School Curriculum and Policies Committee (HELM)
- Energy & Environment Committee (HENG)
- Ethics & Elections Committee (SHEE)
- Job Growth & Workforce Development Sub-Committee (HLBR-HLJG)
- Labor & Commerce Committee (HLBR)
- Occupational Licenses Sub-Committee (HLBR-HLOL)
- Personnel & Pensions Committee (HPPN)
- Small Business, Technology Innovation Committee (SBTE)

As of July 3, 2022, Representative Wilhour was a member of the following Illinois House committees during the 102nd General Assembly:

- Appropriations - Elementary & Secondary Education Committee (HAPE)
- Energy & Environment Committee (HENG)
- Ethics & Elections Committee (SHEE)
- Labor & Commerce Committee (HLBR)
- Personnel & Pensions Committee (HPPN)
- Prescription Drug Affordability Committee (HPDA)
- Transportation: Vehicles & Safety Committee (HVES)
- Wage Policy & Study Subcommittee (HLBR-WAGE)

== Electoral history ==
Illinois 107th State House District Republican Primary, 2018
Party	Candidate	Votes	%
Republican	Blaine Wilhour	6,313	60.37
Republican	Laura A. Myers	4,145	39.63
Total votes		10,458	100.0

Illinois 107th State House District General Election, 2018
Party	Candidate	Votes	%
Republican	Blaine Wilhour	27,112	69.71
Democratic	David J. Seiler	11,779	30.29
Total votes		38,891	100.0
