= Dwight Friedrich =

American politician and businessman (1913–1993)

Dwight Paul Friedrich (July 3, 1913 – August 24, 1993) was an American politician and businessman.

== Biography ==
Dwight Paul Friedrich was born in Marion County, Illinois on June 3, 1913. He was a graduate of Salem High School in Salem, Illinois and attended Southern Illinois University and the University of Minnesota. During World War II, Friedrich served three years in U.S. Naval Intelligence. Friedrich was an active member of the Republican Party including service as chair of Young Republicans chapters for Marion County and Illinois's 23rd congressional district respectively. He served for a time on the Marion County Housing Authority. In 1952, Friedrich was elected to the Illinois Senate from the 42nd district. Friedrich served in the Illinois Senate from 1953 to 1963. In the 1962 general election, Democratic candidate and state representative James Donnewald of Breese defeated Friedrich. Two years later, Donnewald defeated Friedrich in a rematch.

Friedrich lived in Centralia, Illinois and was in the insurance, investment, and real estate business. In 1970, Friedrich was a delegate to the Illinois Constitutional Convention. Friedrich was an advocate for an elected Illinois State Superintendent and an elected Illinois State Board of Education. Friedrich served in the Illinois House of Representatives from 1975 until 1987. In the 1986 general election, Democratic candidate Kurt M. Granberg defeated Friedrich.

Friedrich died in an automobile accident when his automobile hit a median on Interstate 57 near Neoga, Illinois and flipped over several times. An opponent of seat belt laws, he was not wearing a seat belt at the time.
