= Mater Dei High School (Breese, Illinois) =

American high school in southern Illinois

Mater Dei Catholic High School
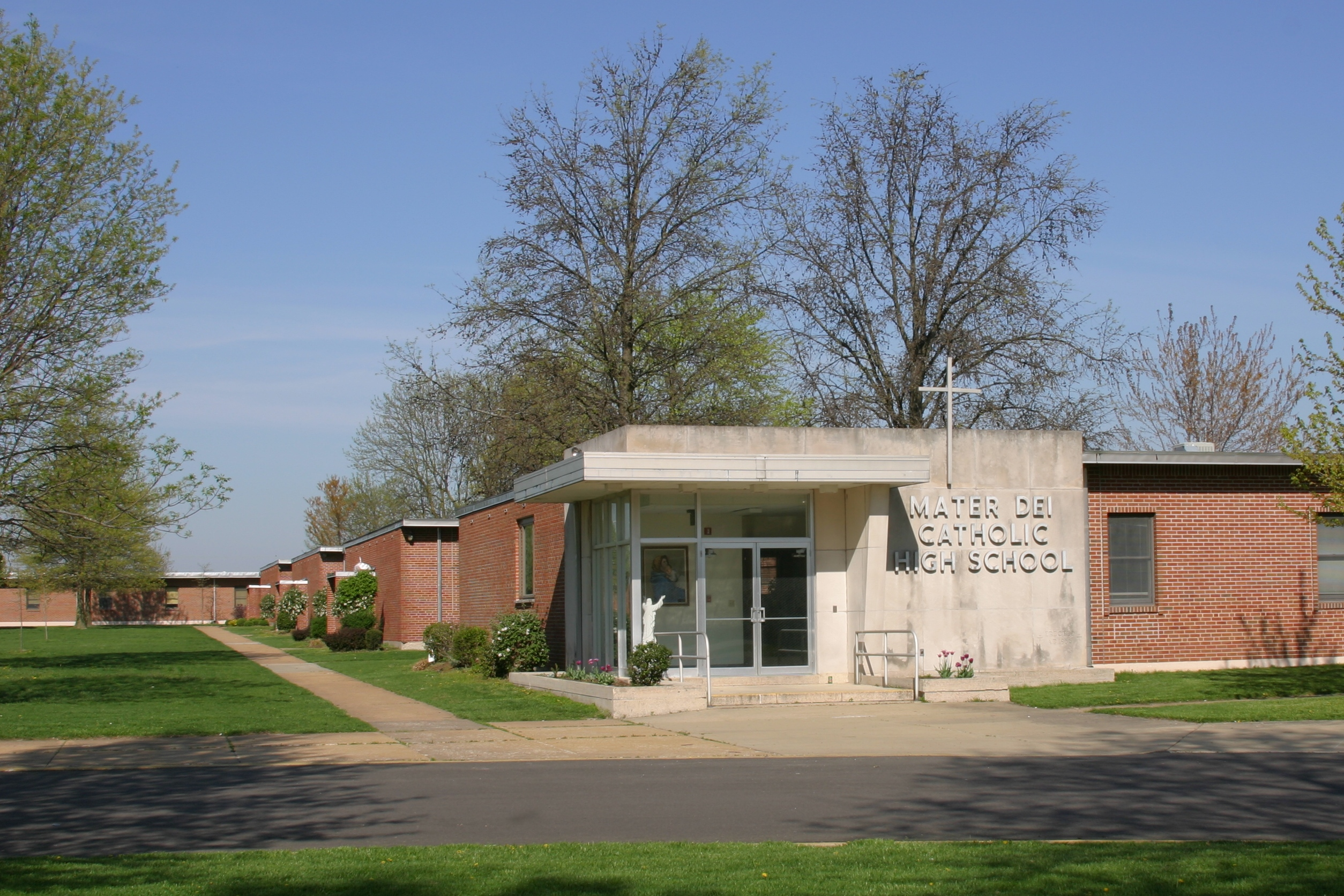

Location
- 900 North Mater Dei Drive; Breese, Illinois 62230; United States; 38°36′57″N 89°31′58″W

Information
- Type: Parochial high school
- Denomination: Roman Catholic
- Established: 1954; 72 years ago
- Oversight: Diocese of Belleville
- Principal: Dennis A. Litteken
- Chaplain: Fr. Chuck Tuttle
- Faculty: 36
- Grades: 9–12
- Gender: Coeducational
- Average class size: 23
- Student to teacher ratio: 13:1
- Colors: Navy, Columbia blue, and white
- Slogan: Rooted in Tradition for a Faith-Filled Future.
- Nickname: (Lady) Knights
- Accreditation: NCA
- Newspaper: The Lance
- Yearbook: The Knight
- Tuition: $6,110 (Catholic Students) $6,610 (Non-Catholic & Out of District Students)
- Website: materdeiknights.org

Mater Dei Catholic High School (often called Breese Mater Dei), is a Catholic, co-educational high school in Breese, Illinois, United States, in the Diocese of Belleville. It was founded in 1954 through the merger of St. Dominic's High School in Breese and St. Mary's High School in Carlyle, Illinois.

The academic program is accredited by North Central Association of Colleges and Schools, and holds a Certificate of Recognition from the Illinois State Board of Education.

Recent developments at Mater Dei include the construction of a new east wing, expanding facilities by adding a new band room, weight room, and gym. In addition, they added an outdoor football / soccer facility with a turf playing surface

== Parishes represented ==
St. Boniface, St. Mary-Centralia, St. Bernard, St. Mary-Edwardsville, St. Rose, St. Felicitas, St. Stephen-Caseyville, St. Francis, St. Teresa-Marydale, St. George, St. Josephs, St. Paul, St. Dominics, St. Mary-Carlyle, St. Augustines, St. Cecilias, St. Marys-Trenton, St. Anthonys- Beckemeyer, and St. Damian. The school also has many students with other religious affiliations, most predominantly among those is that of the Protestant tradition.

== Athletics ==
The school sponsors teams in basketball, bowling, cross country, golf, soccer, and track & field for both boys and girls. The school sponsors teams in baseball and football for boys, while girls also compete in cheerleading, softball, and volleyball. The school is an independent school which does not participate in a conference or league, but is a member of the Illinois High School Association (IHSA) which sponsors and governs statewide competition in many sports. For most of its history, Mater Dei competed in the Class A, or smaller school classification. In recent years, the use of a multiplier on private schools has raised the school to the larger class (AA). They now compete in class 3A of the newly implemented four-class system.

The following teams have won their respective state tournaments sponsored by the IHSA:

- Basketball (boys): 2019–20 (Final Four- cancelled due to Covid-19)
- Basketball (girls): 2022–23
- Cross Country (girls): 2003–04
- Golf (boys): 1993–94, 2019–20
- Volleyball (girls): 1987–88, 1993–94, 1994–95, 1995–96, 2001–02, 2010–11, 2011–12, 2023–24, 2024–25

== Notable alumni ==
- Trevor Richards, MLB pitcher for the Chicago White Sox
- Josh Thole, MLB catcher
