= Helvetia Township, Madison County, Illinois =

Helvetia Township
- Township

- Location of Illinois in the United States
- Coordinates: 38°41′56″N 89°39′33″W
- Country: United States
- State: Illinois
- County: Madison
- Settled: November 2, 1875

Area
  - Total: 36.2 sq mi (94 km^{2})
  - Land: 35.88 sq mi (92.9 km^{2})
  - Water: 0.32 sq mi (0.83 km^{2})
- Elevation: 489 ft (149 m)

Population (2010)
  - Estimate (2016): 8,567
  - Density: 241/sq mi (93/km^{2})
- Time zone: UTC-6 (CST)
  - Summer (DST): UTC-5 (CDT)
- FIPS code: 17-119-33981

Helvetia Township is a township of the city Highland in Madison County, Illinois, in the United States. As of the 2010 census, its population was 8,646 and it contained 3,638 housing units.

== History ==
Helvetia Township was organized in 1876.

== Geography ==
According to the 2010 census, the township has a total area of 36.2 square miles (94 km^{2}), of which 35.88 square miles (92.9 km^{2}) (or 99.12%) is land and 0.32 square miles (0.83 km^{2}) (or 0.88%) is water.

== Demographics ==
Historical population
Census	Pop.	Note	%±
2016 (est.)	8,567
U.S. Decennial Census
