= Journey to New Switzerland =

Journey to New Switzerland (original German title: Reisebericht der Familie Köpfli & Suppiger nach St. Louis am Mississippi und Gründung von New Switzerland im Staate Illinois [Sursee, 1833]) by Joseph Suppiger, Salomon Koepfli, and Kaspar Koepfli is the travel account of member of the two German Swiss families to St. Louis and the subsequent founding of New Switzerland, a locality surrounding and including Highland, Illinois, during 1831-1833.

The book covers the families' journey from Sursee to Le Havre, thence by sea to New York, and on by river to St. Louis in the form of a diary kept by Joseph Suppiger, Jr. Letters from New Switzerland to relatives in Switzerland tell about the land and culture encountered as well as the particular area settled: "But you still do not know what a heavenly area we have found in which to settle. ...[It is a] 450-acre (1.8 km^{2}) farm twenty-seven miles east of St. Louis, consisting mostly of woods," purchased for "the exceedingly low price of nineteen hundred dollars cash" (p. 135). The original work concludes with a chapter primarily on the advantages and disadvantages of the area chosen, but also including advice for emigrants and comments on American culture, e.g., Americans, if one can generalize, "are liberal and on the whole possess a good deal of common sense and sagacity as well as a very practical nature acquired in adapting to conditions here" and "Americans customarily greet one another politely, but are not particularly inclined to tip their hats. The males are especially deferential to women. Fathers expend more care on the training of their daughters than on their sons" (p. 196) and negative comments on slavery.

The English translation includes additional, explanatory material.

The full text of Journey to New Switzerland (in English) is freely available online in the digital collection Swiss Settlers in SW Illinois.

== Complete title ==
Journey to New Switzerland: Travel Account of the Koepfli and Suppiger Family to St. Louis on the Mississippi and the Founding of New Switzerland in the State of Illinois by Joseph Suppiger, Salomon Koepfli, and Kaspar Koepfli, translated by Raymond J. Spahn, With Excerpts from Jennie Latzer Kaeser's Translation of Salomon Koepfli's Die Geschichte der Ansiedlung von Highland (The Story of the Settling of Highland), edited by John C. Abbott, Foreword by Joseph Blake Koepfli. Southern Illinois University Press: Carbondale and Edwardsville.1987. ISBN o-8o93-1313-8.

== See also ==
- Coats, Betty Spindler (comp.) 1983 The Swiss on Looking Glass Prairie: A Century and a Half, 1831-1981. Freely available online in the digital collection Swiss Settlers in SW Illinois.
- Schelbert, Leo 1974. Swiss in North America. Balch institute Reading Lists: Philadelphia. [bibliography of Swiss in America]
- Schweizer, Max 1980 Neu-Schweizerland 1891 - 1880, Genese und Funktion einer schweizerischen Einwanderersiedlung in den Vereinigten Staaten von Nordamerika (Madison County, Illinois). Zug.
- Spahn, Betty A. and Raymond J. Spahn (eds.)1977 New Switzerland in Illinois as Described by Two Early Swiss Settlers, Kaspar koepfli, in Spiegel von Amerika, and Johann jacob Eggen, in Aufzeichnungen aus Highlands Gruendungzeit. Translated by Jennie Latzer Kaeser and Mansfred H. Driesner. Friends of Lovejoy Library, Southern Illinois University at Edwardsville: Edwardsville. Freely available online in the digital collection Swiss Settlers in SW Illinois.
- Duden, Gottfried 1829 Report on a Journey to the Western States of North America. Elberfeld.
- Spahn, Raymond J. 1978 "German Accounts of Early Nineteenth Century Life in Illinois," Papers on Language and Literature 14 (4): 473-488.
