= Paul A. L. Evans =

British academic

- Education: Pembroke College, Cambridge; INSEAD; Massachusetts Institute of Technology
- Occupation: Academic
- Employer: INSEAD

Paul A. L. Evans is a British academic. He is a professor emeritus of organisational behaviour at INSEAD, where he holds the Shell chair of human resources and organisational development.

== Early life ==
Paul A. L. Evans graduated from Pembroke College, Cambridge in 1967. He earned an MBA from INSEAD in 1970 and a PhD from the Massachusetts Institute of Technology in 1974.

== Career ==
Evans joined the faculty at INSEAD in 1974, where he was assistant professor of organisational behavior until he was promoted to tenured associate professor in 1978. From 1983 to 2011, he was a full professor. During that time, he was also a visiting professor at the London Business School from 1998 to 1999, at the Haas School of Business in 2008, and at the China Europe International Business School from 2010 to 2012. He was awarded the Shell chair of human resources and organisational development at INSEAD in 2001, and he retired as professor emeritus in 2011.

Evans is the co-author of several books. In Must Success Cost So Much?, Evans and Bartolomé found that managers were more likely to reach the top of the career ladder if they invested their time and energy equity not only in their work, but also in their families and hobbies.

== Works ==
- Bartolomé, Fernando; Evans, Paul A. L. (1981). Must Success Cost So Much?. New York: Basic Books. ISBN 9780465047468. OCLC 613256093.
- Doz, Yves; Evans, Paul; Laurent, Albert, eds. (1991). Human Resource Management in International Firms: Change, Globalization, Innovation. New York: St Martin's Press. ISBN 9780312041328. OCLC 260212545.
- Barsoux, Jean-Louis; Björkman, Ingmar; Evans, Paul; Pucik, Vladimir (2002). The Global Challenge: International Human Resource Management. Chicago: McGraw-Hill. ISBN 9780073530376. OCLC 760048150.
