= Paul Evans (Illinois politician) =

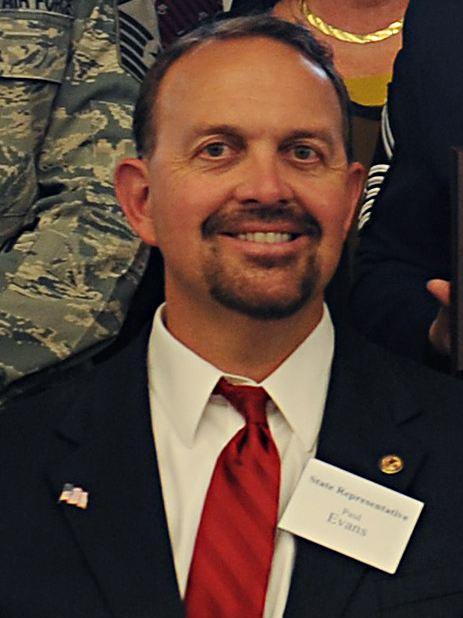
- Evans in 2012

Member of the Illinois House of Representatives from the 102nd district
- In office August 26, 2011 - January 9, 2013
- Preceded by: Ron Stephens
- Succeeded by: Adam Brown

Personal details
- Born: October 26, 1960 (age 65) Red Bud, Illinois
- Party: Republican
- Spouse: Sandra
- Education: Southern Illinois University (BA); Southern Illinois University (JD)
- Profession: Lawyer

Paul Evans (born October 26, 1960) was a Republican member of the Illinois House of Representatives, representing the 102nd district during the 97th Illinois General Assembly from August 2011 to January 2013.

== Early life and career ==
Evans was born October 26, 1960, in Red Bud, Illinois. Evans has worked in Southwestern Illinois as an attorney for nearly 20 years, and has previously served as the Zoning Hearing Officer for the cities of O'Fallon and New Baden, as well as serving on Metro-East Parks and Recreation District Board for 10 years. Evans was the President of the O’Fallon Chamber of Commerce from 2016 to 2018.

== Illinois House of Representatives ==
Ron Stephens resigned from the Illinois House of Representatives effective August 2, 2011, citing the results of the 2011 decennial reapportionment. The Republican Representative Committee of the Republican Party of the 102nd Representative District appointed Evans to the vacancy. Evans was sworn into office on August 26, 2011. The 102nd district at the time included all or parts of Bond, Clinton, Effingham, Fayette, Madison, Shelby, and St. Clair counties.

While a member of the House, Evans was assigned to serve on six house committees: Appropriations-Human Services, Appropriations-Public Safety, Small Business Empowerment & Workforce Development, Tourism & Conventions, Consumer Protection and Environmental Health.

In the 2012 primary election, Evans ran for election in the "new" 108th district where he resided. Charles Meier, a member of the Washington County Board, defeated Evans for the Republican nomination. Meier won the general election in the 108th district while Republican legislator Adam Brown of Decatur won in the "new" 102nd district.

=== Political positions ===
Evans believes in lower taxes to drive economic growth in Illinois, saying "If Illinois is to improve our business climate, we must grow our way out of our troubles which originated from the Chicago Democrat tax hikes."

== Post-legislative career ==
Evans ran unsuccessfully for judgeships in the 20th Judicial Circuit in 2018 and 2022.
