= Marine Township, Madison County, Illinois =

Marine Township
- Township

- Location of Illinois in the United States
- Coordinates: 38°47′17″N 89°45′38″W
- Country: United States
- State: Illinois
- County: Madison
- Settled: November 2, 1875

Area
  - Total: 35.55 sq mi (92.1 km^{2})
  - Land: 35.29 sq mi (91.4 km^{2})
  - Water: 0.26 sq mi (0.67 km^{2})
- Elevation: 528 ft (161 m)

Population (2010)
  - Estimate (2016): 2,200
  - Density: 63.6/sq mi (24.6/km^{2})
- Time zone: UTC-6 (CST)
  - Summer (DST): UTC-5 (CDT)
- FIPS code: 17-119-46877

Marine Township is located in Madison County, Illinois, in the United States. As of the 2010 census, its population was 2,243 and it contained 920 housing units.

== History ==
Marine Township was named by the sea captains who settled there.

== Geography ==
According to the 2010 census, the township has a total area of 35.55 square miles (92.1 km^{2}), of which 35.29 square miles (91.4 km^{2}) (or 99.27%) is land and 0.26 square miles (0.67 km^{2}) (or 0.73%) is water.

== Demographics ==
Historical population
Census	Pop.	Note	%±
2016 (est.)	2,200
U.S. Decennial Census
