= Burgess Township, Illinois =

Township in Illinois, US

Burgess Township
- Township
- Location in Bond County

- Bond County's location in Illinois
- Coordinates: 38°46′42″N 89°32′37″W
- Country: United States
- State: Illinois
- County: Bond
- Settlement: November 6, 1888

Area
  - Total: 37.31 sq mi (96.6 km^{2})
  - Land: 37.2 sq mi (96 km^{2})
  - Water: 0.11 sq mi (0.28 km^{2}) 0.29%
- Elevation: 522 ft (159 m)

Population (2020)
  - Total: 2,190
  - Density: 58.9/sq mi (22.7/km^{2})
- Time zone: UTC-6 (CST)
  - Summer (DST): UTC-5 (CDT)
- ZIP codes: 62246, 62249, 62273, 62275
- FIPS code: 17-005-09694

Burgess Township is one of nine townships in Bond County, Illinois, USA. As of the 2020 census, its population was 2,190 and it contained 967 housing units.

== Geography ==
According to the 2010 census, the township has a total area of 37.31 square miles (96.6 km^{2}), of which 37.2 square miles (96 km^{2}) (or 99.71%) is land and 0.11 square miles (0.28 km^{2}) (or 0.29%) is water.

=== Cities ===
- Pierron (east three-quarters)
- Pocahontas (vast majority)

=== Cemeteries ===
The township contains three cemeteries: Burgess, Hug and Saint Nicholas.

=== Major highways ===
- Interstate 70
- Illinois State Route 143

=== Lakes ===
- Tomahawk Lake

== Demographics ==
As of the 2020 census there were 2,190 people, 813 households, and 578 families residing in the township. The population density was 58.72 inhabitants per square mile (22.67/km^{2}). There were 967 housing units at an average density of 25.93 units per square mile (10.01 units/km^{2}). The racial makeup of the township was 95.16% White, 0.68% African American, 0.27% Native American, 0.23% Asian, 0.00% Pacific Islander, 0.23% from other races, and 3.42% from two or more races. Hispanic or Latino of any race were 1.00% of the population.

There were 813 households, out of which 29.80% had children under the age of 18 living with them, 64.08% were married couples living together, 5.29% had a female householder with no spouse present, and 28.91% were non-families. 21.50% of all households were made up of individuals, and 6.80% had someone living alone who was 65 years of age or older. The average household size was 2.54 and the average family size was 2.99.

The township's age distribution consisted of 22.5% under the age of 18, 4.7% from 18 to 24, 27.8% from 25 to 44, 27.7% from 45 to 64, and 17.2% who were 65 years of age or older. The median age was 42.6 years. For every 100 females, there were 91.0 males. For every 100 females age 18 and over, there were 102.1 males.

The median income for a household in the township was $70,491, and the median income for a family was $81,842. Males had a median income of $52,641 versus $21,944 for females. The per capita income for the township was $30,805. About 4.7% of families and 9.1% of the population were below the poverty line, including 6.9% of those under age 18 and 4.8% of those age 65 or over.

Historical population
Census	Pop.	Note	%±
2010	2,439		—
2020	2,190		−10.2%
U.S. Decennial Census

== School districts ==
- Bond County Community Unit School District 2
- Highland Community Unit School District 5

== Political districts ==
- Illinois' 19th congressional district
- State House District 102
- State Senate District 51
