= Paul Evans (brand) =

New York City-based menswear brand

- Company type: Private
- Industry: E-commerce, footwear
- Founded: August 2013
- Founders: Evan Fript
- Headquarters: United States
- Area served: International
- Products: Designer men's shoes
- Website: paulevansny.com

Paul Evans is a digitally-native New York City-based menswear brand, best known for its collection of luxury footwear. The company was founded by Evan Fript and Benjamin Earley in 2012. It is vertically integrated and sells internationally into 100 countries around the world, directly to consumers online. The shoes are handmade in Naples, Italy.

== History ==
Evan Fript and Benjamin Earley began their careers working in finance in New York City. The idea for the brand originated as the two realized how expensive traditional men's luxury shoes were and how few brand options existed.

Fript and Earley founded the Paul Evans brand in 2012, and launched the e-commerce website in August 2013. The company received seed funding from a group of young investors in 2013 to fund the first few factory orders.

Fript and Earley looked at different European manufacturers in Spain, Italy and Portugal, and selected a family-owned factory in Naples that produces other internationally known brands in the industry.

== Description ==
Paul Evans is a vertically integrated menswear brand that sells its Italian luxury footwear internationally directly to the consumer. The brand first released three cap-toe oxfords, including the Brando, the Cagney and the Grant, all made from Italian calfskin. In 2014, the brand introduced three additional styles including the Stewart penny loafer, the Martin whole-cut oxford and the Chaplin suede tassel loafer. By 2015, the company produced 16 styles of men's shoes. Paul Evans' shoes have been featured by Forbes, Refinery29, and Esquire Magazine.
