= St. Paul Catholic Church (Highland, Illinois) =

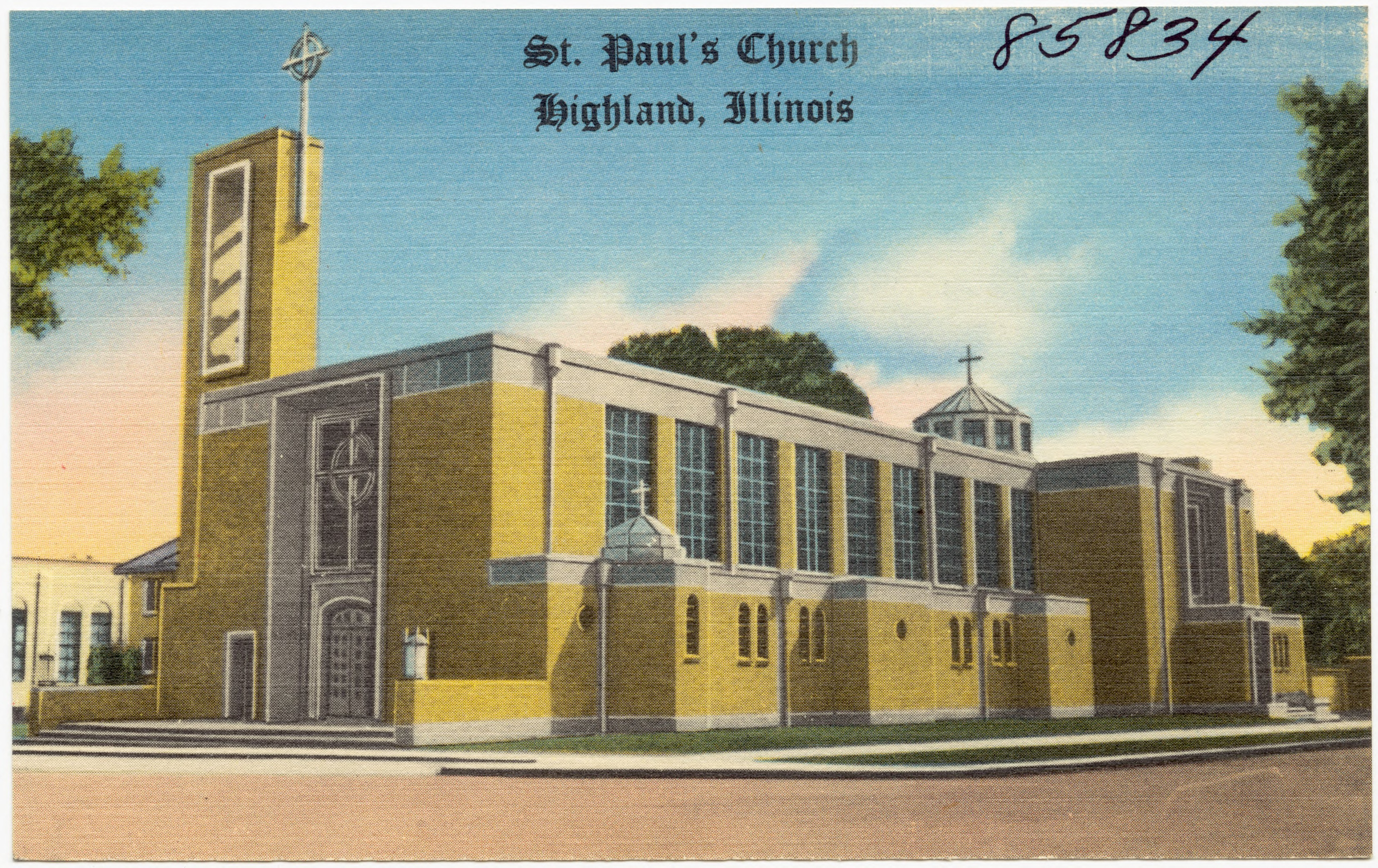
- St. Paul Catholic Church
- 38.741331°N 89.673699°W
- Location: Highland, IL
- Country: United States of America
- Denomination: Roman Catholic

History
- Founded: 1846

Administration
- Diocese: Springfield in Illinois

Clergy
- Bishop: Thomas J. Paprocki

St. Paul Church is a Roman Catholic parish with an elementary school in the Diocese of Springfield in Illinois located in Highland, Illinois. The Kirchenfest, a church picnic held each year, is one of the largest church festivals in Southern Illinois.

== Leadership ==
- Rev. Pat Jakel, Pastor
- Rev. Mariadas Chatla, Parochial Vicar
- Deacon Dave Bohnenstiehl, Permanent Deacon

== Mass times ==
Saturday at 4:00 p.m.

Sunday at 7:00 am, 8:30 am, and 10:30 a.m.

== Kirchenfest ==
Kirchenfest, which is German for "Church Festival," is one of the largest church festivals in Southern Illinois. The event spreads over six acres on the grounds of St. Paul Parish. It originally began in 1970. The festival has a German theme, as the Highland, Illinois community is primarily Swiss and German heritage.

Events at the Kirchenfest:

- Strassenlauf 5K & 2K Run/Walk
- Saturday morning Auction, during which an 8-foot pizza is purchased
