= Pocahontas, Illinois =

- Village
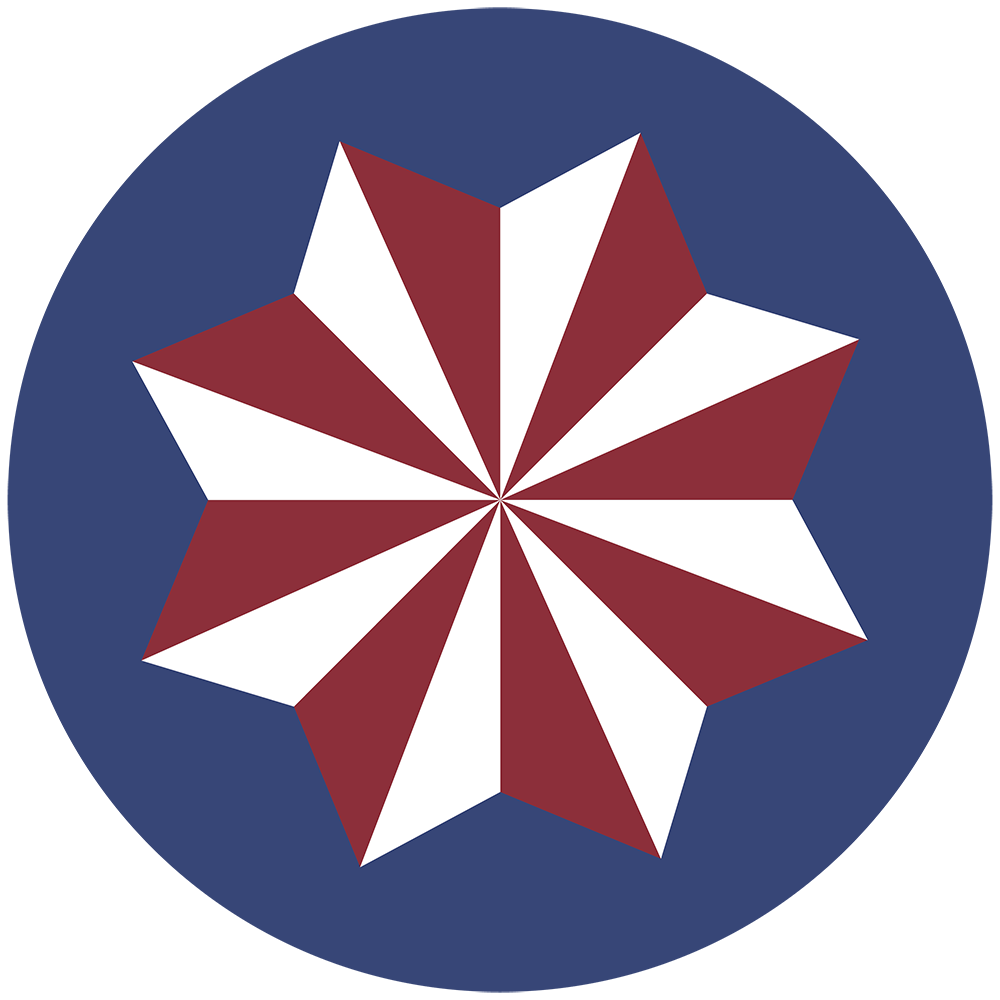
- Emblem

- Location of Pocahontas in Bond County and Illinois
- Coordinates: 38°49′24″N 89°32′22″W
- Country: United States
- State: Illinois
- County: Bond
- Township: Burgess
- Incorporated: 1847

Government
  - Village president: Karen Heilig

Area
  - Total: 0.80 sq mi (2.08 km^{2})
  - Land: 0.78 sq mi (2.03 km^{2})
  - Water: 0.023 sq mi (0.06 km^{2})
- Elevation: 528 ft (161 m)

Population (2020)
  - Total: 697
  - Estimate (2024): 669 ▼
  - Density: 890/sq mi (343.6/km^{2})
- Time zone: UTC-6 (CST)
  - Summer (DST): UTC-5 (CDT)
- ZIP Code(s): 62275
- Area code: 618
- FIPS code: 17-60872
- GNIS feature ID: 2398991
- Website: villageofpocahontas.org

Pocahontas is a village in Burgess Township, Bond County, Illinois, United States. The population was 697 at the 2020 census.

== History ==
Pocahontas was originally known as Hickory Grove and then Amity. In 1850, the name was changed to Pocohontas (with an "o"). In 1855, the current spelling with an "a" came into place. Pocahontas was incorporated as a village in 1847. The town was named after Pocahontas Coal.

The production of coal was huge in Pocahontas in the early 1900's. The mine was a great source of profit for the town and was in production for nearly 40 years. Although production stayed consistent the owners of the mine itself changed multiple times. The Pocahontas Coal Company began the production of coal in Pocahontas, IL in 1905 and ended in 1929. Then the mine stayed in production through the Bond County Coal Company in 1930. In 1931 the mine was in production through the Pocahontas Mining Company. Then within the next year the mine found its final production name. The Illinois Pocahontas Coal Company became its lasting name from 1932-1942. The mine closed in 1942, and this was the end of the coal mining era in Pocahontas, IL. Through the 37 years the mine was in production it produced 4,772,340 tons of coal.

== Geography ==
According to the 2021 census gazetteer files, Pocahontas has a total area of 0.80 square miles (2.07 km^{2}), of which 0.78 square miles (2.02 km^{2}) (or 97.39%) is land and 0.02 square miles (0.05 km^{2}) (or 2.61%) is water.

== Demographics ==
Historical population
Census	Pop.	Note	%±
1880	369		—
1890	372		0.8%
1900	482		29.6%
1910	749		55.4%
1920	830		10.8%
1930	976		17.6%
1940	750		−23.2%
1950	667		−11.1%
1960	718		7.6%
1970	764		6.4%
1980	866		13.4%
1990	837		−3.3%
2000	727		−13.1%
2010	784		7.8%
2020	697		−11.1%
U.S. Decennial Census

As of the 2020 census there were 697 people, 321 households, and 207 families residing in the village. The population density was 866.92 inhabitants per square mile (334.72/km^{2}). There were 323 housing units at an average density of 401.74 per square mile (155.11/km^{2}). The racial makeup of the village was 94.55% White, 0.43% African American, 0.29% Asian, 0.00% Pacific Islander, and 4.73% from two or more races. Hispanic or Latino of any race were 0.86% of the population.

There were 321 households, out of which 25.5% had children under the age of 18 living with them, 52.96% were married couples living together, 7.17% had a female householder with no husband present, and 35.51% were non-families. 26.17% of all households were made up of individuals, and 11.84% had someone living alone who was 65 years of age or older. The average household size was 3.04 and the average family size was 2.48.

The village's age distribution consisted of 20.1% under the age of 18, 5.8% from 18 to 24, 26.6% from 25 to 44, 31.5% from 45 to 64, and 15.9% who were 65 years of age or older. The median age was 41.6 years. For every 100 females, there were 97.3 males. For every 100 females age 18 and over, there were 108.9 males.

The median income for a household in the village was $51,375, and the median income for a family was $62,188. Males had a median income of $44,375 versus $26,364 for females. The per capita income for the village was $23,914. About 10.6% of families and 18.1% of the population were below the poverty line, including 20.0% of those under age 18 and 2.4% of those age 65 or over.

== Notable people ==
- Michael Slape, member of the Illinois House of Representatives from the 110th district from 1979 to 1985. He resided in Pocahontas during his political career.
- Gretchen Wilson, Grammy Award-winning country singer; born and raised in Pocahontas; she references the town in the song "Pocahontas Proud" from her 2004 album Here for the Party.

== See also ==
- Greenville, Illinois
- Vandalia, Illinois
