= Breese, Illinois =

Breese
- City
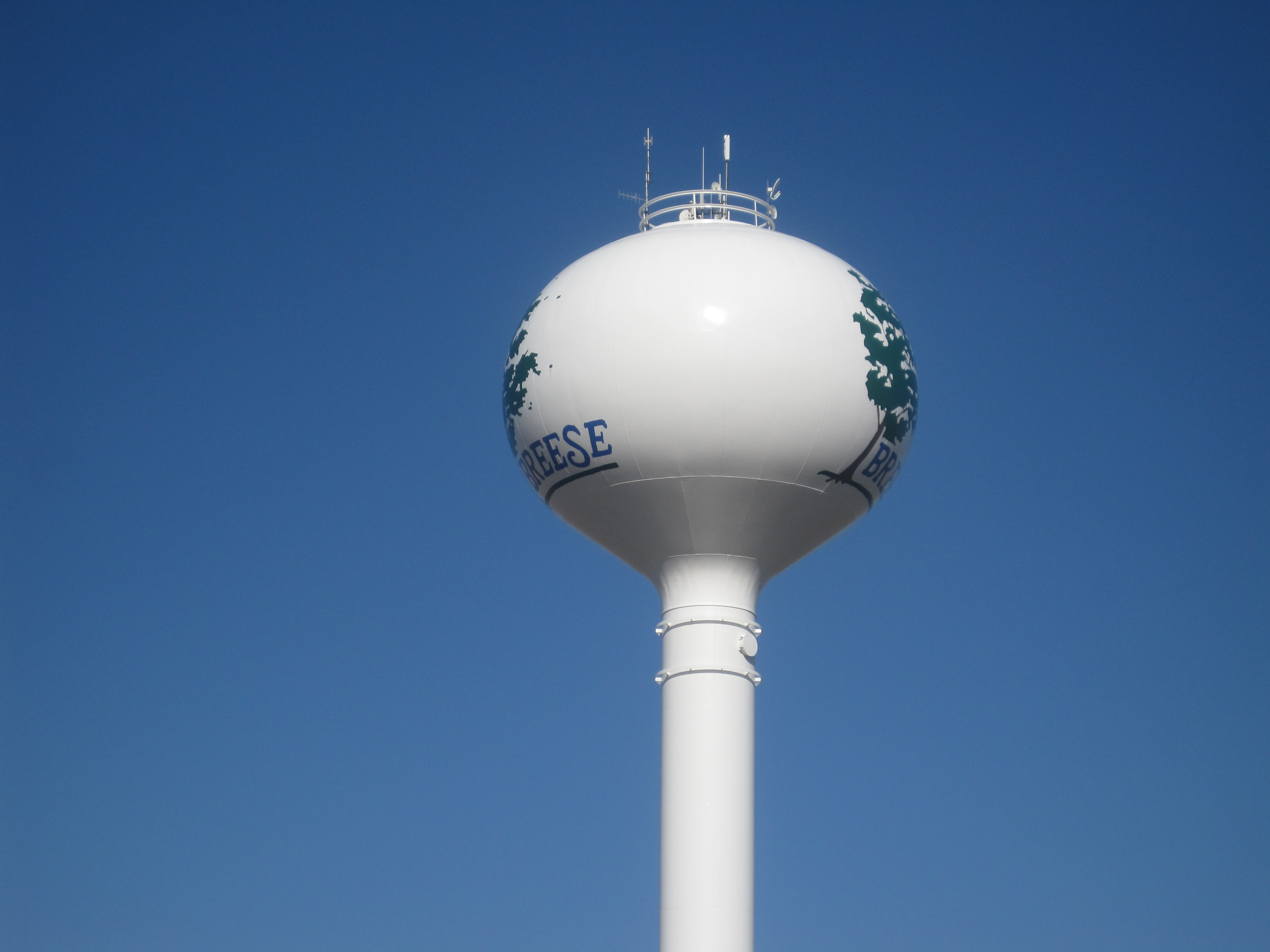
- Breese water tower along U.S. Route 50
- Motto: "Proud of our past, planning for our future"
- Location of Breese in Clinton County, Illinois.
- Coordinates: 38°36′50″N 89°30′33″W
- Country: United States
- State: Illinois
- County: Clinton
- Established: April 1st, 1856
- Named for: Sidney Breese

Area
  - Total: 2.70 sq mi (6.99 km^{2})
  - Land: 2.67 sq mi (6.92 km^{2})
  - Water: 0.027 sq mi (0.07 km^{2})
- Elevation: 453 ft (138 m)

Population (2020)
  - Total: 4,641
  - Density: 1,737/sq mi (670.5/km^{2})
- Time zone: UTC-6 (CST)
  - Summer (DST): UTC-5 (CDT)
- ZIP code: 62230
- Area code: 618
- FIPS code: 17-07913
- GNIS feature ID: 2393409
- Website: breese.org

Breese is a city in Clinton County, Illinois, United States. Breese is the most populous city completely within Clinton County. As of the 2020 census, the population was 4,641, the majority of whom are of German ancestry. Breese is part of the Metro-East region of the Greater St. Louis metropolitan area.

== History ==
The town is named after Sidney Breese, a United States Senator and a contemporary of President Abraham Lincoln. Breese was founded in 1855.

Even though the area around Breese, Illinois, was first settled in 1816, it was not until 1835 that Germans came to the town to farm because of the flat, fertile land there. Twenty years after the Germans' first immigration, the Mississippi and Ohio Railroad was completed. The early pioneers were enthralled by the thought of transportation by railroad. The Chicago-based company Sanger Kamp & Co. bought 80 acres of land near the railroad. Twenty-four acres were laid out with the railroad splitting the original town, with some acres on the north side and some on the south side, creating Breese Township, February 3, 1855.

Late in 1855, forty Catholic immigrants, wanting to fulfill their religious needs, had the idea of constructing a church. Their desires were realized when two years later, the Sanger Kamp & Co. gave half of one of its 80 acres (32 ha) to the Catholics’ project. By December 1869, St. Dominic's Catholic Church was completed. Breese was first recognized as a town on April 11, 1871, and later became a village on September 23, 1876. As a result, the construction of the village hall had begun. This project was completed in 1885. Seven years later, a volunteer fire department was organized. The ever-growing population was then acknowledged as a city on January 19, 1905. The mayor of this new city was Henry Hummert.

Realizing that Breese would need some improvements, the mayor authorized the construction of an electric light plant that was completed in 1906. The streets of Breese were also topped with road oil in 1911. The next year, improvements to the city's water works facility were also made.

However, things took a turn for the worse when, in 1914, scarlet fever swept the community and its surrounding area and forced all the schools to close. Only four years later, still in the wake of the scarlet fever, the flu epidemic spread through the area.

=== 1906 Coal mine disaster ===
On December 24, 1906, six miners were killed, and one was injured when a mine cage collapsed and fell down the shaft in a mine owned and operated by The Breese and Trenton Coal Company. The miners killed included Henry Middeke, Herman Scheleper, Walter Schaffner, August Foppe, Frank Zehrer, and Hermann Holtmann. The only one injured was mine manager William Fritz. An investigation concluded that improper filling of an old air shaft caused a dirt slide leading to the collapse. The Breese and Trenton Coal Company was found guilty of negligence.

== Geography ==
According to the 2021 census gazetteer files, Breese has a total area of 2.69 square miles (6.97 km^{2}), of which 2.67 square miles (6.92 km^{2}) (or 99.07%) is land and 0.03 square miles (0.08 km^{2}) (or 0.93%) is water.

Breese is located on U.S. Route 50, 40 miles (64 km) east of St. Louis, Missouri.

== Demographics ==
Historical population
Census	Pop.	Note	%±
1870	489		—
1880	574		17.4%
1890	808		40.8%
1900	1,571		94.4%
1910	2,128		35.5%
1920	2,399		12.7%
1930	1,957		−18.4%
1940	2,206		12.7%
1950	2,181		−1.1%
1960	2,461		12.8%
1970	2,885		17.2%
1980	3,516		21.9%
1990	3,567		1.5%
2000	4,048		13.5%
2010	4,442		9.7%
2020	4,641		4.5%
U.S. Decennial Census

=== 2020 census ===
As of the 2020 census, Breese had a population of 4,641. The median age was 41.8 22.4% of residents were under the age of 18, and 20.4% were 65 years of age or older. For every 100 females, there were 96.5 males, and for every 100 females age 18 and over, there were 92.1 males age 18 and over.

99.7% of residents lived in urban areas, while 0.3% lived in rural areas.

There were 1,946 households in Breese, including 1,116 families. Of all households, 28.2% had children under the age of 18 living in them, 50.9% were married-couple households, 16.8% were households with a male householder and no spouse or partner present, and 25.2% were households with a female householder and no spouse or partner present. About 31.4% of all households were made up of individuals, and 17.6% had someone living alone who was 65 years of age or older.

There were 2,038 housing units, of which 4.5% were vacant. The homeowner vacancy rate was 1.3%, and the rental vacancy rate was 6.8%. The population density was 1,722.72 inhabitants per square mile (665.15/km^{2}), and there were 2,038 housing units at an average density of 756.50 per square mile (292.09/km^{2}).

Racial composition as of the 2020 census
Race	Number	Percent
White	4,330	93.3%
Black or African American	11	0.2%
American Indian and Alaska Native	6	0.1%
Asian	15	0.3%
Native Hawaiian and Other Pacific Islander	0	0.0%
Some other race	132	2.8%
Two or more races	147	3.2%
Hispanic or Latino (of any race)	203	4.4%

=== Income and poverty ===
The median income for a household in the city was $70,411, and the median income for a family was $90,208. Males had a median income of $44,779 versus $26,833 for females. The per capita income for the city was $43,197. About 1.2% of families and 4.9% of the population were below the poverty line, including 0.0% of those under age 18 and 8.2% of those age 65 or over.

== Education ==
Public schools:

- District 12 Grade School (Breese, Illinois)
- Central Community High School - Formed as a consolidation of the Breese and Aviston high schools in 1971

Private schools:

- Mater Dei High School (Breese, Illinois)
- All Saints Academy Grade School (Breese, Illinois)

== Notable people ==
- Jake Odorizzi, former pitcher for the Tampa Bay Rays; born in Breese
- Josh Thole, former catcher for the New York Mets and Toronto Blue Jays; born in Breese
- Tom Timmermann, former pitcher for the Detroit Tigers and Cleveland Indians; born in Breese
