= Don E. Brummet =

American politician and businessman

Don E. Brummet (June 3, 1914 – May 11, 1981) was an American politician and businessman.

Brummet was born in Dahlgren, Illinois. Brummet graduated from the Du Quoin Township High School in Du Quoin, Illinois and Southern Illinois University. He served in the United States Merchant Marines during World War II He moved to Vandalia, Illinois, in 1939, with his wife and family. Brummet worked as the manager of the Coca-Cola Bottling Company in Vandalia and was in the fertilizer business. He was also the owner of the Vandalia Airport. Brummet served on the Vandalia City Council and was a Democrat. Brummet served in the Illinois House of Representatives from 1971 to 1979. Brummer died at Fayette County Hospital in Vandalia, Illinois.
