= 2022 Illinois House of Representatives election =

- November 8, 2022

All 118 seats in the Illinois House of Representatives 60 seats needed for a majority
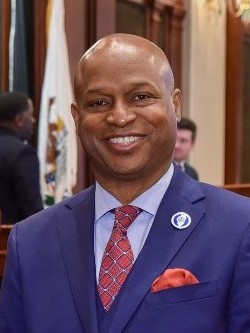

	Majority party	Minority party
Leader	Emanuel "Chris" Welch	Jim Durkin
Party	Democratic	Republican
Leader's seat	7th	82nd
Last election	73	45
Seats won	78	40
Seat change	▲5	▼5
Popular vote	1,872,947	1,943,438
Percentage	49.08%	50.92%
Swing	▼9.36%	▲11.81%
- Democratic gain Republican gain Democratic hold Republican hold 50–60% 60–70% 70–80% 80–90% >90% 50–60% 60–70% 70–80% 80–90% >90% 50–60% 60–70% 70–80% 80–90% >90% 50–60% 60–70% 70–80% 80–90% >90%
Speaker before election
Emanuel "Chris" Welch
Democratic
Elected Speaker
Emanuel "Chris" Welch
Democratic

The 2022 elections for the Illinois House of Representatives were held on Tuesday, November 8, 2022, to elect representatives from all 118 Representative districts in the Illinois House of Representatives. The primary election occurred on Tuesday, June 28, 2022. The winners of this election would serve in the 103rd General Assembly, with seats apportioned among the state based on the 2020 United States census. The Democratic Party had held a House majority since 1997. 92 Democratic candidates; 104 Republican candidates and one independent candidate ran for a house seat. The inauguration of the 103rd General Assembly occurred on Wednesday, January 11, 2023.

Following redistricting for the 2020 census, Democrats flipped seven seats and Republicans flipped two seats, which resulted in the Democrats' net gain of five seats, increasing their supermajority to 78 out of 118 seats. Democrats increased their majority despite losing the popular vote.

== Retirements ==
=== Democrats ===
1. District 4: Delia Ramirez retired to run for US Representative from Illinois's 3rd congressional district.
2. District 13: Greg Harris retired.
3. District 46: Deb Conroy retired to run for Chair of the DuPage County Board.
4. District 62: Sam Yingling retired to run for state senator from District 31.
5. District 72: Michael Halpin retired to run for state senator from District 36.

=== Republicans ===
1. District 45: Seth Lewis retired to run for state senator from District 24.
2. District 54: Tom Morrison retired.
3. District 88: Keith P. Sommer retired.
4. District 89: Andrew Chesney retired to run for state senator from District 45.
5. District 90: Tom Demmer retired to run for treasurer of Illinois.
6. District 95: Avery Bourne retired to run for lieutenant governor of Illinois.
7. District 97: Mark Batinick retired.
8. District 99: Sandy Hamilton retired to run for state senator from District 48.
9. District 105: Dan Brady retired to run for Secretary of State of Illinois.

== Predictions ==
Source	Ranking	As of
Sabato's Crystal Ball	Likely D	May 19, 2022

== Overview ==
2022 Illinois House of Representatives general election
Party	Votes	Percentage	% change	Candidates	Seats before	Seats after	+/–
Democratic	1,872,947	49.08%	▼9.36%	93	73	78	▲5
Republican	1,943,438	50.92%	▲11.81%	104	45	40	▼5
Write-Ins	37	0.00%	Steady	1	0	0	Steady
Totals		100.00%	—		118	118	—

Popular vote
Republican	50.92%
Democratic	49.08%

House seats
Democratic	66.10%
Republican	33.90%

== Close races ==
District	Winner	Margin
District 45	Democratic (gain)	0.84%
District 47	Republican	6.18%
District 49	Democratic	8.18%
District 51	Democratic (gain)	6.56%
District 52	Republican	4.60%
District 55	Democratic	8.84%
District 63	Republican	5.74%
District 65	Republican	8.40%
District 66	Democratic	6.34%
District 68	Democratic	9.46%
District 83	Democratic	7.46%
District 91	Democratic (gain)	4.50%
District 97	Democratic (gain)	3.32%
District 104	Republican	8.04%
District 112	Democratic	8.44%
District 114	Republican (gain)	5.64%

== Election details ==
=== Redistricting ===
With the 2020 United States census, all 59 legislative districts and the corresponding 118 representative districts were required to be redrawn to accommodate the new population data. As a result of the COVID-19 pandemic, the United States Census Bureau stated that the necessary data for redistricting would not be available until September 2021. The Illinois Constitution states that:

"In the year following each Federal decennial census year, the General Assembly by law shall redistrict the Legislative Districts and the Representative Districts. If no redistricting plan becomes effective by June 30 of that year, a Legislative Redistricting Commission shall be constituted not later than July 10. The Commission shall consist of eight members, no more than four of whom shall be members of the same political party." — Illinois Constitution Article IV Section 3b

With the possibility of this commission and the state constitution not specifying what population data to use in redistricting, Illinois Democrats went ahead and started the redistricting process. In redistricting, the committees used data from the American Community Survey. Democrats faced criticism from Republicans over the use of the ACS data in redistricting and shutting out Republicans in the redistricting process. Governor J. B. Pritzker faced criticism for his previous support in 2018 for an independent commission and pledge to veto any maps "in any way drafted or created by legislators, political party leaders and/or their staffs or allies."

== Districts 1–25 ==
=== District 1 ===
The district had been represented by Democrat Aaron Ortiz since January 9, 2019. Ortiz was re-elected unopposed in 2020. He faced no ballot-listed candidate in the general election.

Democratic primary results
Party	Candidate	Votes	%
Democratic	Aaron M. Ortiz (incumbent)	3,840	100
Total votes		3,840	100.0

2022 Illinois' 1st representative district election results
Party	Candidate	Votes	%
Democratic	Aaron M. Ortiz (incumbent)	11,611	100.0
Total votes		11,611	100.0
Democratic hold			

=== District 2 ===
The district had been represented by Democrat Theresa Mah since January 11, 2017. Mah was re-elected unopposed in 2020. Mah was redistricted to the 24th district and was re-elected in her new boundaries. 24th district state representative Elizabeth Hernandez was the Democratic nominee and faced no other ballot-listed candidates in the general election.

Democratic primary results
Party	Candidate	Votes	%
Democratic	Elizabeth "Lisa" Hernandez	6,017	100.0
Total votes		6,017	100.0

2022 Illinois' 2nd representative district election results
Party	Candidate	Votes	%
Democratic	Elizabeth "Lisa" Hernandez	16,412	100.0
Total votes		16,412	100.0
Democratic hold			

=== District 3 ===
The 3rd district covers parts of the Chicago neighborhoods of Belmont Cragin, Dunning, Hermosa, Logan Square, Montclare, Portage Park, and West Town. The district had been represented by Democrat Eva-Dina Delgado since her appointment on November 15, 2019. Delgado was elected unopposed in 2020. Jonathan Serrano, a United States Army veteran, was the Republican nominee.

Democratic primary results
Party	Candidate	Votes	%
Democratic	Eva-Dina Delgado (incumbent)	7,887	100
Total votes		7,887	100.0

Republican primary results
Party	Candidate	Votes	%
Republican	Jonathan Serrano	976	100.0
Total votes		976	100.0

2022 Illinois' 3rd representative district election results
Party	Candidate	Votes	%
Democratic	Eva-Dina Delgado (incumbent)	19,056	81.95
Republican	Jonathan Serrano	4,196	18.05
Total votes		23,252	100.0
Democratic hold			

=== District 4 ===
The 4th district covers parts of the Chicago neighborhoods of Austin, Belmont Cragin, Hermosa, Humboldt Park, and West Town. The district had been represented by Democrat Delia Ramirez since January 9, 2019. Ramirez was re-elected unopposed in 2020. Ramirez ran in the 3rd congressional district and won. Lilian Jiménez, an attorney, Manuel Jimenez, Jr., and Hector Villafuerte all ran for the Democratic nomination. Jimenez won the Democratic nomination. JD Sloat was the Republican nominee.

Democratic primary results
Party	Candidate	Votes	%
Democratic	Lilian Jiménez	6,426	78.31
Democratic	Manuel Jimenez, Jr.	1,104	13.45
Democratic	Hector Villafuerte	676	8.24
Total votes		8,206	100.0

Republican primary results
Party	Candidate	Votes	%
Republican	JD Sloat	493	100.0
Total votes		493	100.0

2022 Illinois' 4th representative district election results
Party	Candidate	Votes	%
Democratic	Lilian Jiménez	19,111	88.23
Republican	JD Sloat	2,549	11.77
Total votes		21,660	100.0
Democratic hold			

=== District 5 ===
The district had been represented by Democrat Lamont Robinson since January 9, 2019. Robinson was re-elected unopposed in 2020. Robinson faced no other ballot-listed candidate in the general election.

Democratic primary results
Party	Candidate	Votes	%
Democratic	Lamont Robinson (incumbent)	10,198	100.0
Total votes		10,198	100.0

2022 Illinois' 5th representative district election results
Party	Candidate	Votes	%
Democratic	Lamont Robinson (incumbent)	23,847	100.0
Total votes		23,847	100.0
Democratic hold			

=== District 6 ===
The district had been represented by Democrat Sonya Harper since her appointment in October 2015. Harper was re-elected unopposed in 2020. Harper defeated Carolynn Crump for the Democratic nomination. Leonard Griffin, a retiree and truck driver, was the Republican nominee.

Democratic primary results
Party	Candidate	Votes	%
Democratic	Sonya Marie Harper (incumbent)	5,055	71.68
Democratic	Carolynn Denise Crump	1,997	28.32
Total votes		7,052	100.0

2022 Illinois' 6th representative district election results
Party	Candidate	Votes	%
Democratic	Sonya Marie Harper (incumbent)	16,019	86.58
Republican	Leonard Griffin	2,484	13.42
Total votes		18,503	100.0
Democratic hold			

=== District 7 ===
The district had been represented by Democratic House Speaker Emanuel "Chris" Welch since January 9, 2013. Welch was re-elected unopposed in 2020. Eddie Kornegay, the CEO of a local tech startup, was the Republican nominee.

Democratic primary results
Party	Candidate	Votes	%
Democratic	Emanuel "Chris" Welch (incumbent)	10,790	100.0
Total votes		10,790	100.0

Republican primary results
Party	Candidate	Votes	%
Republican	Eddie L. Kornegay, Jr.	2,269	100.0
Total votes		2,269	100.0

2022 Illinois' 7th representative district election results
Party	Candidate	Votes	%
Democratic	Emanuel "Chris" Welch (incumbent)	25,112	77.69
Republican	Eddie L. Kornegay, Jr.	7,210	22.31
Total votes		32,322	100.0
Democratic hold			

=== District 8 ===
The district had been represented by Democrat La Shawn Ford since January 10, 2007. Ford was re-elected unopposed in 2020. Thomas Hurley, a member of Lions Club International, was the Republican nominee.

Democratic primary results
Party	Candidate	Votes	%
Democratic	La Shawn K. Ford (incumbent)	9,963	100
Total votes		9,963	100.0

2022 Illinois' 8th representative district election results
Party	Candidate	Votes	%
Democratic	La Shawn K. Ford (incumbent)	22,187	75.51
Republican	Thomas Hurley	7,195	24.49
Total votes		29,382	100.0
Democratic hold			

=== District 9 ===
The district had been represented by Democrat Lakesia Collins since her appointment on July 24, 2020. Collins was elected unopposed in 2020. Collins faced no other ballot-listed candidate in the general election.

Democratic primary results
Party	Candidate	Votes	%
Democratic	Lakesia Collins (incumbent)	7,500	100.0
Total votes		7,500	100.0

2022 Illinois' 9th representative district election results
Party	Candidate	Votes	%
Democratic	Lakesia Collins (incumbent)	20,413	100.0
Total votes		20,413	100.0
Democratic hold			

=== District 10 ===
The district had been represented by Democrat Jawaharial Williams since his appointment on May 17, 2019. Williams was elected unopposed in 2020. Williams faced no other ballot-listed candidates in the general election.

Democratic primary results
Party	Candidate	Votes	%
Democratic	Jawaharial "Omar" Williams (incumbent)	8,662	100.0
Total votes		8,662	100.0

2022 Illinois' 10th representative district election results
Party	Candidate	Votes	%
Democratic	Jawaharial "Omar" Williams (incumbent)	24,344	100.0
Total votes		24,344	100.0
Democratic hold			

=== District 11 ===
The district had been represented by Democrat Ann Williams since January 12, 2011. Williams was re-elected unopposed in 2020. Marc James, an employee in hotel management, was the Republican nominee.

Democratic primary results
Party	Candidate	Votes	%
Democratic	Ann M. Williams (incumbent)	15,091	100.0
Total votes		15,091	100.0

2022 Illinois' 11th representative district election results
Party	Candidate	Votes	%
Democratic	Ann M. Williams (incumbent)	36,894	85.48
Republican	Marc James	6,265	14.52
Total votes		43,159	100.0
Democratic hold			

=== District 12 ===
The district had been represented by Democrat Margaret Croke since January 2, 2021. Croke was first elected unopposed in 2020. Croke defeated Abigail Nichols for the Democratic nomination. George Kemper, an Army veteran, was the Republican nominee.

Democratic primary results
Party	Candidate	Votes	%
Democratic	Margaret Croke (incumbent)	12,360	99.89
Write-in		14	0.11
Total votes		12,374	100.0

Republican primary results
Party	Candidate	Votes	%
Republican	George Kemper	1,798	100.0
Total votes		1,798	100.0

2022 Illinois' 12th representative district election results
Party	Candidate	Votes	%
Democratic	Margaret Croke (incumbent)	31,332	80.20
Republican	George Kemper	7,735	19.80
Total votes		39,067	100.0
Democratic hold			

=== District 13 ===
The district had been represented by Democrat Greg Harris since December 2006. Harris was re-elected unopposed in 2020. He did not seek re-election. Five candidates ran for the Democratic nomination:

- Eileen Dordek, mental health professional
- Hoan Huynh, entrepreneur
- Fernando "Sergio" Mojica, Chicago Public School principal
- Andrew Peters
- Joe Struck

One additional candidate, Becky Levin (policy director at the Cook County Sheriff's Office), ran for the office but dropped out before the primary election. Hoan Huynh won the Democratic nomination.

Alper Turan, a teacher, was the Republican nominee.

Democratic primary results
Party	Candidate	Votes	%
Democratic	Hoan Huynh	8,615	45.43
Democratic	Eileen Dordek	6,864	36.19
Democratic	Fernando "Sergio" Mojica	1,580	8.33
Democratic	Andrew "Andy" Peters	1,491	7.86
Democratic	Joseph "Joe" Struck	415	2.19
Total votes		18,965	100.0

Republican primary results
Party	Candidate	Votes	%
Republican	Alper Turan	906	100.0
Total votes		906	100.0

2022 Illinois' 13th representative district election results
Party	Candidate	Votes	%
Democratic	Hoan Huynh	36,347	90.49
Republican	Alper Turan	3,821	9.51
Total votes		40,168	100.0
Democratic hold			

=== District 14 ===
The district had been represented by Democrat Kelly Cassidy since her appointment in May 2011. Cassidy was re-elected unopposed in 2020. She faced no other ballot-listed candidates in the general election.

Democratic primary results
Party	Candidate	Votes	%
Democratic	Kelly M. Cassidy (incumbent)	14,227	100.0
Total votes		14,227	100.0

2022 Illinois' 14th representative district election results
Party	Candidate	Votes	%
Democratic	Kelly M. Cassidy (incumbent)	29,635	100.0
Total votes		29,635	100.0
Democratic hold			

=== District 15 ===
The district had been represented by Democrat John D'Amico since November 2004. D'Amico was re-elected unopposed in 2020. On November 5, 2021, D'Amico announced he was retiring from his seat effective the same day. Michael Kelly, an athletic director, was appointed on November 23, 2021. Kelly defeated Michael Rabbitt, a business transformation leader at Argonne National Laboratory, for the Democratic nomination. Mark Albers, the Board President of the Morton Grove Chamber of Commerce, was the Republican nominee.

Democratic primary results
Party	Candidate	Votes	%
Democratic	Michael J. Kelly (incumbent)	6,282	52.36
Democratic	Michael Patrick Rabbitt	5,715	47.64
Total votes		11,997	100.0

Republican primary results
Party	Candidate	Votes	%
Republican	Mark R. Albers	3,070	100.0
Total votes		3,070	100.0

2022 Illinois' 15th representative district election results
Party	Candidate	Votes	%
Democratic	Michael J. Kelly (incumbent)	20,984	65.57
Republican	Mark R. Albers	11,018	34.43
Total votes		32,002	100.0
Democratic hold			

=== District 16 ===
The district had been represented by Democrat Denyse Wang Stoneback since January 13, 2021. Stoneback was first elected unopposed in 2020. Stoneback lost the Democratic nomination to Kevin Olickal, a former Cook County recovery specialist. Vince Romano, a financial advisor and Republican candidate in 2012, was the Republican nominee.

Democratic primary results
Party	Candidate	Votes	%
Democratic	Kevin Olickal	5,450	53.03
Democratic	Denyse Wang Stoneback (incumbent)	4,828	46.97
Total votes		10,278	100.0

Republican primary results
Party	Candidate	Votes	%
Republican	Vince Romano	1,545	100.0
Total votes		1,545	100.0

2022 Illinois' 16th representative district election results
Party	Candidate	Votes	%
Democratic	Kevin Olickal	17,648	70.86
Republican	Vince Romano	7,256	29.14
Total votes		24,904	100.0
Democratic hold			

=== District 17 ===
The district had been represented by Democrat Jennifer Gong-Gershowitz since January 9, 2019. Gong-Gershowitz was re-elected with 67.6% of the vote in 2020. Bradley Martin was the Republican nominee.

Democratic primary results
Party	Candidate	Votes	%
Democratic	Jennifer Gong-Gershowitz (incumbent)	11,405	100.0
Total votes		11,405	100.0

Republican primary results
Party	Candidate	Votes	%
Republican	Bradley Martin	3,257	100.0
Total votes		3,257	100.0

2022 Illinois' 17th representative district election results
Party	Candidate	Votes	%
Democratic	Jennifer Gong-Gershowitz (incumbent)	29,057	71.38
Republican	Bradley Martin	11,648	28.62
Total votes		40,705	100.0
Democratic hold			

=== District 18 ===
The district had been represented by Democrat Robyn Gabel since her appointment in April 2010. Gabel was re-elected with 72.3% of the vote in 2020. Charles Hutchinson, president of the Wilmette-Kenilworth Chamber of Commerce, was the Republican nominee.

Democratic primary results
Party	Candidate	Votes	%
Democratic	Robyn Gabel (incumbent)	13,635	100.0
Total votes		13,635	100.0

Republican primary results
Party	Candidate	Votes	%
Republican	Charles Hutchinson	1,987	100.0
Total votes		1,987	100.0

2022 Illinois' 18th representative district election results
Party	Candidate	Votes	%
Democratic	Robyn Gabel (incumbent)	32,808	81.31
Republican	Charles Hutchinson	7,542	18.69
Total votes		40,350	100.0
Democratic hold			

=== District 19 ===
The district had been represented by Democrat Lindsey LaPointe since her appointment on July 24, 2019. LaPointe was elected with 58.4% of the vote in 2020. LaPointe defeated Tina Wallace, a real estate broker, for the Democratic nomination. Michael Harn was the Republican nominee.

Democratic primary results
Party	Candidate	Votes	%
Democratic	Lindsey LaPointe (incumbent)	9,474	76.13
Democratic	Tina Wallace	2,970	23.87
Total votes		12,444	100.0

2022 Illinois' 19th representative district election results
Party	Candidate	Votes	%
Democratic	Lindsey LaPointe (incumbent)	22,458	69.85
Republican	Michael Harn	9,695	30.15
Total votes		32,153	100.0
Democratic hold			

=== District 20 ===
The district had been represented by Republican Bradley Stephens since his appointment in June 2019. Stephens was elected with 54.6% of the vote in 2020. Stephens faced no other ballot-listed candidates in the general election.

Republican primary results
Party	Candidate	Votes	%
Republican	Brad Stephens (incumbent)	5,300	100.0
Total votes		5,300	100.0

2022 Illinois' 20th representative district election results
Party	Candidate	Votes	%
Republican	Brad Stephens (incumbent)	24,146	100.0
Total votes		24,146	100.0
Republican hold			

=== District 21 ===
The district had been represented by Democrat Edgar Gonzalez, Jr. since his appointment on January 10, 2020. Gonzalez was elected unopposed in 2020. Gonzalez was redistricted to the 23rd district and won re-election in his new boundaries. 23rd district state representative Michael J. Zalewski lost to Abdelnasser Rashid, former Deputy Chief of Staff for Cook County Clerk David Orr, for the Democratic nomination. Matthew Schultz, executive director of Taxpayers United of America, was the Republican nominee.

Democratic primary results
Party	Candidate	Votes	%
Democratic	Abdelnasser Rashid	4,214	52.33
Democratic	Michael J. Zalewski	3,838	47.67
Total votes		8,052	100.0

Republican primary results
Party	Candidate	Votes	%
Republican	Matthew J. Schultz	2,196	100.0
Total votes		2,196	100.0

2022 Illinois' 21st representative district election results
Party	Candidate	Votes	%
Democratic	Abdelnasser Rashid	14,904	66.01
Republican	Matthew J. Schultz	7,675	33.99
Total votes		22,579	100.0
Democratic hold			

=== District 22 ===
The district had been represented by Mike Madigan since January 13, 1993 and had served in the Illinois House since January 13, 1971. He was the 67th Speaker of the House from 1983 to 1995 and the 69th Speaker of the House from 1997 to 2021. Madigan was re-elected with 100.0% of the vote in 2020. After suspending his campaign for the Speakership in 2021, Madigan announced he would resign as state representative at the end of February but ended up resigning on February 18. Chicago City Council infrastructure manager Edward Guerra Kodatt was appointed to the district on February 21, 2021 but would resign three days later on February 24, 2021. He resigned due to Madigan and Chicago's 13th ward alderman Marty Quinn's suggestion after they became aware of “allegations of questionable conduct.” Angelica Guerrero-Cuellar, an auxiliary board member for the National Museum of Mexican Art, was appointed on February 25, 2021. Carlos Alvarez, an insurance agent, was the Republican nominee.

Democratic primary results
Party	Candidate	Votes	%
Democratic	Angie Guerrero-Cuellar (incumbent)	5,538	100.0
Total votes		5,538	100.0

2022 Illinois' 22nd representative district election results
Party	Candidate	Votes	%
Democratic	Angie Guerrero-Cuellar (incumbent)	14,362	65.23
Republican	Carlos Alvarez	7,654	34.77
Total votes		22,016	100.0
Democratic hold			

=== District 23 ===
The district had been represented by Democrat Michael J. Zalewski since December 2008. Zalewski was re-elected unopposed in 2020. Zalewski was redistricted to the 21st district and lost renomination in his new boundaries. 21st district state representative Edgar Gonzalez, Jr. was the Democratic nominee. Lupe Castillo was the Republican nominee.

Democratic primary results
Party	Candidate	Votes	%
Democratic	Edgar Gonzalez, Jr.	2,884	100.0
Total votes		2,884	100.0

2022 Illinois' 23rd representative district election results
Party	Candidate	Votes	%
Democratic	Edgar Gonzalez, Jr.	7,832	82.00
Republican	Lupe Castillo	1,719	18.00
Total votes		9,551	100.0
Democratic hold			

=== District 24 ===
The district had been represented by Democrat Elizabeth "Lisa" Hernandez since January 10, 2007. Hernandez was re-elected unopposed in 2020. Hernandez was redistricted to the 2nd district and was re-elected in her new boundaries. 2nd district state representative Theresa Mah was the Democratic nominee and faced no other ballot-listed candidates in the general election.

Democratic primary results
Party	Candidate	Votes	%
Democratic	Theresa Mah	6,145	100.0
Total votes		6,145	100.0

2022 Illinois' 24th representative district election results
Party	Candidate	Votes	%
Democratic	Theresa Mah	14,532	100.0
Total votes		14,532	100.0
Democratic hold			

=== District 25 ===
The district had been represented by Democrat Curtis Tarver since January 9, 2019. Tarver was re-elected unopposed in 2020. Tarver defeated Josef Michael Carr, a businessman, for the Democratic nomination. Lori Yokoyama was previously the Republican nominee but would drop out for unknown reasons. Tarver faced no other ballot-listed candidates in the general election.

Democratic primary results
Party	Candidate	Votes	%
Democratic	Curtis J. Tarver II (incumbent)	9,890	76.55
Democratic	Josef Michael Carr	3,029	23.45
Total votes		12,919	100.0

Republican primary results
Party	Candidate	Votes	%
Republican	Lori Yokoyama	453	100.0
Total votes		453	100.0

2022 Illinois' 25th representative district election results
Party	Candidate	Votes	%
Democratic	Curtis J. Tarver II (incumbent)	23,792	100.0
Total votes		23,792	100.0
Democratic hold			

== Districts 26–50 ==
=== District 26 ===
The district had been represented by Democrat Kam Buckner since his appointment on January 18, 2019. Buckner was elected with 100.0% of the vote in 2020. He faced no other ballot-listed candidates in the general election.

Democratic primary results
Party	Candidate	Votes	%
Democratic	Kam Buckner (incumbent)	10,531	100
Total votes		10,531	100.0

2022 Illinois' 26th representative district election results
Party	Candidate	Votes	%
Democratic	Kam Buckner (incumbent)	24,017	100.0
Total votes		24,017	100.0
Democratic hold			

=== District 27 ===
The district had been represented by Democrat Justin Slaughter since his appointment in January 2017. Slaughter was re-elected unopposed in 2020. Slaughter defeated Jasimone Ward, an Emergency medical technician, for the Democratic nomination. Beth O'Neil was the Republican nominee.

Democratic Primary
Party	Candidate	Votes	%
Democratic	Justin Q. Slaughter (incumbent)	9,869	78.83
Democratic	Jasimone Ward	2,651	21.17
Total votes		12,520	100.0

2022 Illinois' 27th representative district election results
Party	Candidate	Votes	%
Democratic	Justin Q. Slaughter (incumbent)	25,003	70.97
Republican	Beth O'Neil	10,229	29.03
Total votes		35,232	100.0
Democratic hold			

=== District 28 ===
The district had been represented by Democrat Robert Rita since January 8, 2003. Rita was re-elected with 99.4% of the vote in 2020. Rita defeated Paris Walker-Thomas, a write-in candidate, for the Democratic nomination. He faced no other ballot listed candidates in the general election.

Democratic primary results
Party	Candidate	Votes	%
Democratic	Robert "Bob" Rita (incumbent)	8,015	99.84
Write-in		13	0.16
Total votes		8,028	100.0

2022 Illinois' 28th representative district election results
Party	Candidate	Votes	%
Democratic	Robert "Bob" Rita (incumbent)	22,195	99.83
Write-in		37	0.17
Total votes		22,232	100.0
Democratic hold			

=== District 29 ===
The district had been represented by Democrat Thaddeus Jones since January 12, 2011. Jones was re-elected unopposed in 2020. Jones defeated Calumet City 2nd Ward Councilwoman Monet S. Wilson for the Democratic nomination. Jeffery Coleman, an entrepreneur, was the Republican nominee.

Democratic primary results
Party	Candidate	Votes	%
Democratic	Thaddeus Jones (incumbent)	8,125	77.70
Democratic	Monet S. Wilson	2,332	22.30
Total votes		10,457	100.0

2022 Illinois' 29th representative district election results
Party	Candidate	Votes	%
Democratic	Thaddeus Jones (incumbent)	23,198	69.51
Republican	Jeffery Coleman	10,178	30.49
Total votes		33,376	100.0
Democratic hold			

=== District 30 ===
The district had been represented by Democrat Will Davis since January 8, 2003. Davis was re-elected unopposed in 2020. Patricia Bonk, a nurse, was the Republican nominee.

Democratic primary results
Party	Candidate	Votes	%
Democratic	William "Will" Davis (incumbent)	9,577	100.0
Total votes		9,577	100.0

Republican primary results
Party	Candidate	Votes	%
Republican	Patricia Bonk	1,635	100.0
Total votes		1,635	100.0

2022 Illinois' 30th representative district election results
Party	Candidate	Votes	%
Democratic	William "Will" Davis (incumbent)	23,127	80.12
Republican	Patricia Bonk	5,739	19.88
Total votes		28,866	100.0
Democratic hold			

=== District 31 ===
The district had been represented by Democrat Mary E. Flowers since January 9, 1985. Flowers was re-elected unopposed in 2020. Kenneth J. Yerkes, a dentist, was the Republican nominee.

Democratic primary results
Party	Candidate	Votes	%
Democratic	Mary E. Flowers (incumbent)	10,035	100.0
Total votes		10,035	100.0

Republican primary results
Party	Candidate	Votes	%
Republican	Kenneth J. Yerkes	1,920	100.0
Total votes		1,920	100.0

2022 Illinois' 31st representative district election results
Party	Candidate	Votes	%
Democratic	Mary E. Flowers (incumbent)	20,868	77.44
Republican	Kenneth J. Yerkes	6,080	22.56
Total votes		26,948	100.0
Democratic hold			

=== District 32 ===
The district had been represented by Democrat Andre Thapedi since January 14, 2009. Thapedi was re-elected unopposed in 2020. On January 31, 2021, Thapedi announced his intention to resign from his seat, stating the passing of his parents driving his intention. Thapedi resigned on March 17, 2021. City Colleges of Chicago associate athletics director Cyril Nichols was appointed to the seat on April 8, 2021 to fill the remainder of the term. Carl Kunz, a FINRA arbitrator, was the Republican nominee.

Democratic primary results
Party	Candidate	Votes	%
Democratic	Cyril Nichols (incumbent)	6,207	100.0
Total votes		6,207	100.0

Republican primary results
Party	Candidate	Votes	%
Republican	Carl R. Kunz	787	100.0
Total votes		787	100.0

2022 Illinois' 32nd representative district election results
Party	Candidate	Votes	%
Democratic	Cyril Nichols (incumbent)	15,603	82.26
Republican	Carl R. Kunz	3,366	17.74
Total votes		18,969	100.0
Democratic hold			

=== District 33 ===
The district had been represented by Democrat Marcus C. Evans Jr. since his appointment in April 2012. Evans Jr. was re-elected unopposed in 2020. Quintin Barton was the Republican nominee.

Democratic primary results
Party	Candidate	Votes	%
Democratic	Marcus C. Evans Jr. (incumbent)	10,647	100.0
Total votes		10,647	100.0

2022 Illinois' 33rd representative district election results
Party	Candidate	Votes	%
Democratic	Marcus C. Evans Jr. (incumbent)	23,564	87.60
Republican	Quintin Barton	3,335	12.40
Total votes		26,899	100.0
Democratic hold			

=== District 34 ===
The district had been represented by Democrat Nicholas Smith since his appointment on February 4, 2018. Smith was re-elected unopposed in 2020. Frederick Walls, a journeyman carpenter, was the Republican nominee.

Democratic primary results
Party	Candidate	Votes	%
Democratic	Nicholas "Nick" Smith (incumbent)	10,740	100.0
Total votes		10,740	100.0

Republican primary results
Party	Candidate	Votes	%
Republican	Frederick L. Walls	2,250	100.0
Total votes		2,250	100.0

2022 Illinois' 34th representative district election results
Party	Candidate	Votes	%
Democratic	Nicholas "Nick" Smith (incumbent)	24,854	78.22
Republican	Frederick L. Walls	6,922	21.78
Total votes		31,776	100.0
Democratic hold			

=== District 35 ===
The district had been represented by Democrat Frances Ann Hurley since January 9, 2013. Hurley was re-elected with 64.2% of the vote in 2020. Hurley defeated David Dewar, a write-in candidate, for the Democratic nomination. Herb Hebein, the Republican nominee in 2020, was the Republican nominee.

Democratic primary results
Party	Candidate	Votes	%
Democratic	Frances Ann Hurley (incumbent)	12,071	99.95
Write-in		6	0.05
Total votes		12,077	100.0

Republican primary results
Party	Candidate	Votes	%
Republican	Herb Hebein	5,813	100.0
Total votes		5,813	100.0

2022 Illinois' 35th representative district election results
Party	Candidate	Votes	%
Democratic	Frances Ann Hurley (incumbent)	26,112	62.02
Republican	Herb Hebein	15,992	37.98
Total votes		42,104	100.0
Democratic hold			

=== District 36 ===
The district had been represented by Democrat Kelly M. Burke since January 12, 2011. Burke was re-elected unopposed in 2020. David Sheppard, a police officer, defeated Robbie Katherine Regina for the Republican nomination.

Democratic primary results
Party	Candidate	Votes	%
Democratic	Kelly M. Burke (incumbent)	8,534	100.0
Total votes		8,534	100.0

Republican primary results
Party	Candidate	Votes	%
Republican	David Sheppard	2,996	63.83
Republican	Robbie Katherine Segina	1,698	36.17
Total votes		4,694	100.0

2022 Illinois' 36th representative district election results
Party	Candidate	Votes	%
Democratic	Kelly M. Burke (incumbent)	21,209	61.78
Republican	David Sheppard	13,122	38.22
Total votes		34,331	100.0
Democratic hold			

=== District 37 ===
The district had been represented by Republican Tim Ozinga since January 13, 2021. Ozinga was first elected with 63.7% of the vote in 2020. Ozinga defeated August "O'Neill" Deuser, the Republican nominee for Illinois's 1st congressional district in 2016, for the Republican nomination. He faced no other ballot-listed candidates in the general election.

Republican Primary
Party	Candidate	Votes	%
Republican	Tim Ozinga (incumbent)	10,145	99.83
Write-in		17	0.17
Total votes		10,162	100.0

2022 Illinois' 37th representative district election results
Party	Candidate	Votes	%
Republican	Tim Ozinga (incumbent)	35,890	100.0
Total votes		35,890	100.0
Republican hold			

=== District 38 ===
The district had been represented by Democrat Debbie Meyers-Martin since January 9, 2019. Meyers-Martin was re-elected with 77.5% of the vote in 2020. Tom Toolis, an attorney, was the Republican nominee.

Democratic primary results
Party	Candidate	Votes	%
Democratic	Debbie Meyers-Martin (incumbent)	11,484	100.0
Total votes		11,484	100.0

Republican primary results
Party	Candidate	Votes	%
Republican	Tom Toolis	3,468	100.0
Total votes		3,468	100.0

2022 Illinois' 38th representative district election results
Party	Candidate	Votes	%
Democratic	Debbie Meyers-Martin (incumbent)	27,135	70.73
Republican	Tom Toolis	11,229	29.27
Total votes		38,364	100.0
Democratic hold			

=== District 39 ===
The district had been represented by Democrat Will Guzzardi since January 14, 2015. Guzzardi was re-elected unopposed in 2020. Anthony Curran, an investment manager, was the Republican nominee.

Democratic primary results
Party	Candidate	Votes	%
Democratic	Will Guzzardi (incumbent)	9,450	100.0
Total votes		9,450	100.0

2022 Illinois' 39th representative district election results
Party	Candidate	Votes	%
Democratic	Will Guzzardi (incumbent)	21,918	85.75
Republican	Anthony Curran	3,642	14.25
Total votes		25,560	100.0
Democratic hold			

=== District 40 ===
The district had been represented by Democrat Jaime Andrade Jr. since his appointment in August 2013. Andrade Jr. was re-elected unopposed in 2020. He faced no other ballot-listed candidates in the general election.

Democratic primary results
Party	Candidate	Votes	%
Democratic	Jaime M. Andrade, Jr. (incumbent)	9,969	100.0
Total votes		9,969	100.0

2022 Illinois' 40th representative district election results
Party	Candidate	Votes	%
Democratic	Jaime M. Andrade, Jr. (incumbent)	23,552	100.0
Total votes		23,552	100.0
Democratic hold			

=== District 41 ===
The district had been represented by Democrat Janet Yang Rohr since January 13, 2021. Rohr was first elected with 51.7% of the vote in 2020. Jennifer Bruzan Taylor, a Naperville City Councilwoman, was the Republican nominee. Taylor would drop out from the race due to family matters. Rich Janor, Naperville Park District Commissioner, was appointed as the Republican nominee.

Democratic primary results
Party	Candidate	Votes	%
Democratic	Janet Yang Rohr (incumbent)	8,045	100.0
Total votes		8,045	100.0

Republican primary results
Party	Candidate	Votes	%
Republican	Jennifer Bruzan Taylor	6,409	100.0
Total votes		6,409	100.0

2022 Illinois' 41st representative district election results
Party	Candidate	Votes	%
Democratic	Janet Yang Rohr (incumbent)	25,960	60.44
Republican	Richard Janor	16,989	39.56
Total votes		42,949	100.0
Democratic hold			

=== District 42 ===
The district had been represented by Republican Amy Grant since January 9, 2019. Grant was re-elected with 51.9% of the vote in 2020. Grant was redistricted to the 47th district and was re-elected in her new boundaries. 48th district state representative Terra Costa Howard was the Democratic nominee. Stefanie Hood, a lawyer, was the Republican nominee.

Republican primary results
Party	Candidate	Votes	%
Republican	Stefanie Hood	7,487	100.0
Total votes		7,487	100.0

Democratic primary results
Party	Candidate	Votes	%
Democratic	Terra Costa Howard	10,918	100.0
Total votes		10,918	100.0

2022 Illinois' 42nd representative district election results
Party	Candidate	Votes	%
Democratic	Terra Costa Howard	25,822	58.27
Republican	Stefanie Hood	18,494	41.73
Total votes		44,316	100.0
Democratic gain from Republican			

=== District 43 ===
The district had been represented by Democrat Anna Moeller since her appointment in March 2014. Moeller was re-elected unopposed in 2020. Angela Hallock Nowak, a teacher, was the Republican nominee.

Democratic primary results
Party	Candidate	Votes	%
Democratic	Anna Moeller (incumbent)	3,822	100.0
Total votes		3,822	100.0

Republican primary results
Party	Candidate	Votes	%
Republican	Angela Hallock Nowak	2,298	100.0
Total votes		2,298	100.0

2022 Illinois' 43rd representative district election results
Party	Candidate	Votes	%
Democratic	Anna Moeller (incumbent)	11,274	63.87
Republican	Angela Hallock Nowak	6,377	36.13
Total votes		17,651	100.0
Democratic hold			

=== District 44 ===
The district had been represented by Democrat Fred Crespo since January 10, 2007. Crespo was re-elected with 100.0% of the vote in 2020. Patrick Thomas Brouillette, a business owner, was the Republican nominee.

Democratic primary results
Party	Candidate	Votes	%
Democratic	Fred Crespo (incumbent)	5,536	100.0
Total votes		5,536	100.0

Republican primary results
Party	Candidate	Votes	%
Republican	Patrick Thomas Brouillette	2,749	100.0
Total votes		2,749	100.0

2022 Illinois' 44th representative district election results
Party	Candidate	Votes	%
Democratic	Fred Crespo (incumbent)	14,192	63.58
Republican	Patrick Thomas Brouillette	8,130	36.42
Total votes		22,322	100.0
Democratic hold			

=== District 45 ===
The district had been represented by Republican Seth Lewis since January 13, 2021. Lewis was first elected in 53.2% of the vote in 2020. Lewis ran for the Illinois Senate in the 24th Legislative district. 47th district state representative Deanne Mazzochi was the Republican nominee. Jenn Ladisch Douglass, a lawyer, was the Democratic nominee.

Republican primary results
Party	Candidate	Votes	%
Republican	Deanne Marie Mazzochi	7,911	100.0
Total votes		7,911	100.0

Democratic primary results
Party	Candidate	Votes	%
Democratic	Jenn Ladisch Douglass	7,964	100.0
Total votes		7,964	100.0

2022 Illinois' 45th representative district election results
Party	Candidate	Votes	%
Democratic	Jenn Ladisch Douglass	21,960	50.42
Republican	Deanne Marie Mazzochi	21,596	49.58
Total votes		43,556	100.0
Democratic gain from Republican			

=== District 46 ===
The district had been represented by Democrat Deb Conroy since January 9, 2013. Conroy was re-elected unopposed in 2020. Conroy ran for DuPage County Executive. Diane Blair-Sherlock, an attorney, was the Democratic nominee. Robert Stevens, a truck driver, was the Republican nominee.

Democratic primary results
Party	Candidate	Votes	%
Democratic	Diane Blair-Sherlock	5,820	100.0
Total votes		5,820	100.0

Republican primary results
Party	Candidate	Votes	%
Republican	Robert R. Stevens	4,559	100.0
Total votes		4,559	100.0

2022 Illinois' 46th representative district election results
Party	Candidate	Votes	%
Democratic	Diane Blair-Sherlock	16,054	56.52
Republican	Robert R. Stevens	12,348	43.48
Total votes		28,402	100.0
Democratic hold			

=== District 47 ===
The district had been represented by Republican Deanne Mazzochi since her appointment in July 2018. Mazzochi was re-elected with 54.0% of the vote in 2020. Mazzochi was redistricted to the 45th district and lost re-election in her new boundaries. 42nd district state representative Amy Grant was the Republican nominee. Jackie Williamson, a benefits specialist, was the Democratic nominee.

Republican primary results
Party	Candidate	Votes	%
Republican	Amy Grant	9,676	100.0
Total votes		9,676	100.0

2022 Illinois' 47th representative district election results
Party	Candidate	Votes	%
Republican	Amy L. Grant	24,471	53.09
Democratic	Jackie Williamson	21,621	46.91
Total votes		46,092	100.0
Republican hold			

=== District 48 ===
The district had been represented by Democrat Terra Costa Howard since January 9, 2019. Howard was re-elected with 53.8% of the vote in 2020. Howard was redistricted to the 42nd district and was re-elected in her new boundaries. Azam Nizamuddin, an attorney, was the Democratic nominee. Jennifer Sanalitro, a sales executive, was the Republican nominee.

Democratic primary results
Party	Candidate	Votes	%
Democratic	Azam Nizamuddin	5,995	100.0
Total votes		5,995	100.0

Republican primary results
Party	Candidate	Votes	%
Republican	Jennifer Sanalitro	7,052	100.0
Total votes		7,052	100.0

2022 Illinois' 48th representative district election results
Party	Candidate	Votes	%
Republican	Jennifer Sanalitro	20,655	55.03
Democratic	Azam Nizamuddin	16,879	44.97
Total votes		37,534	100.0
Republican gain from Democratic			

=== District 49 ===
The district had been represented by Democrat Maura Hirschauer since January 13, 2021. Hirschauer was first elected with 54.2% of the vote in 2020. Bartlett mayor Kevin Wallace was the Republican nominee.

Democratic primary results
Party	Candidate	Votes	%
Democratic	Maura Hirschauer (incumbent)	5,426	100.0
Total votes		5,426	100.0

Republican primary results
Party	Candidate	Votes	%
Republican	Kevin Wallace	5,020	100.0
Total votes		5,020	100.0

2022 Illinois' 49th representative district election results
Party	Candidate	Votes	%
Democratic	Maura Hirschauer (incumbent)	16,859	54.09
Republican	Kevin Wallace	14,309	45.91
Total votes		31,168	100.0
Democratic hold			

=== District 50 ===
The district had been represented by Republican Keith R. Wheeler since January 14, 2015. Wheeler was re-elected with 56.4% of the vote in 2020. Wheeler was redistricted to the 83rd Representative district and lost re-election in his new boundaries. 83rd district state representative Barbara Hernandez was the Democratic nominee. Donald Walter, the director of diocesan partnerships at the Augustine Institute, was the Republican nominee.

Democratic primary results
Party	Candidate	Votes	%
Democratic	Barbara Hernandez	4,715	100.0
Total votes		4,715	100.0

2022 Illinois' 50th representative district election results
Party	Candidate	Votes	%
Democratic	Barbara Hernandez	14,251	62.76
Republican	Donald Walter	8,457	37.24
Total votes		22,708	100.0
Democratic gain from Republican			

== Districts 51–75 ==
=== District 51 ===
The district had been represented by Republican Chris Bos since January 13, 2021. Bos was first elected with 50.9% of the vote in 2020. Nabeela Syed, an organizer, won the Democratic nomination after defeating Chelsea Laliberte Barnes, a licensed social worker, in the primary election.

==== Endorsements ====
Chelsea Laliberte Barnes (D)

State Executives

- Jesse White, Illinois Secretary of State

State senators

- Melinda Bush (D-31st)

State representatives

- Deb Conroy (D-46th)
- La Shawn Ford (D-8th)

Republican primary results
Party	Candidate	Votes	%
Republican	Chris Bos (incumbent)	7,316	100.0
Total votes		7,316	100.0

Democratic primary results
Party	Candidate	Votes	%
Democratic	Nabeela Syed	7,103	72.18
Democratic	Chelsea Laliberte Barnes	2,737	27.82
Total votes		9,840	100.0

2022 Illinois' 51st representative district election results
Party	Candidate	Votes	%
Democratic	Nabeela Syed	23,775	53.28
Republican	Chris Bos (incumbent)	20,847	46.72
Total votes		44,622	100.0
Democratic gain from Republican			

=== District 52 ===
The district had been represented by Republican Martin McLaughlin since January 13, 2021. McLaughlin was first elected with 54.3% of the vote in 2020. Mary Morgan, a curriculum assistant for Wauconda Community Unit School District 118, was the Democratic nominee.

Republican primary results
Party	Candidate	Votes	%
Republican	Martin McLaughlin (incumbent)	7,927	100.0
Total votes		7,927	100.0

Democratic primary results
Party	Candidate	Votes	%
Democratic	Mary Morgan	6,378	100.0
Total votes		6,378	100.0

2022 Illinois' 52nd representative district election results
Party	Candidate	Votes	%
Republican	Martin McLaughlin (incumbent)	23,088	52.30
Democratic	Mary Morgan	21,059	47.70
Total votes		44,147	100.0
Republican hold			

=== District 53 ===
The district had been represented by Democrat Mark L. Walker since January 9, 2019. He formerly represented the 66th district from January 14, 2009 to January 12, 2011. Walker was re-elected unopposed in 2020. Jack Vrett, an attorney, was the Republican nominee.

Democratic primary results
Party	Candidate	Votes	%
Democratic	Mark L. Walker (incumbent)	6,897	100.0
Total votes		6,897	100.0

Republican primary results
Party	Candidate	Votes	%
Republican	Jack Vrett	4,704	100.0
Total votes		4,704	100.0

2022 Illinois' 53rd representative district election results
Party	Candidate	Votes	%
Democratic	Mark L. Walker (incumbent)	18,449	57.00
Republican	Jack Vrett	13,920	43.00
Total votes		32,369	100.0
Democratic hold			

=== District 54 ===
The district had been represented by Republican Tom Morrison since January 12, 2011. Morrison was not seeking reelection in 2022. Michele Hunter, an attorney, was the Republican nominee. Mary Beth Canty, an attorney, was the Democratic nominee.

Republican primary results
Party	Candidate	Votes	%
Republican	Michele Hunter	5,538	100.0
Total votes		5,538	100.0

Democratic primary results
Party	Candidate	Votes	%
Democratic	Mary Beth Canty	8,052	100.0
Total votes		8,052	100.0

2022 Illinois' 54th representative district election results
Party	Candidate	Votes	%
Democratic	Mary Beth Canty	21,750	59.46
Republican	Michele Hunter	14,829	40.54
Total votes		36,579	100.0
Democratic gain from Republican			

=== District 55 ===
The district had been represented by Democrat Marty Moylan since January 9, 2013. Moylan was re-elected with 72.6% of the vote in 2020. Michael M. Lupo, a small business owner, was the Republican nominee.

Democratic primary results
Party	Candidate	Votes	%
Democratic	Martin J. Moylan (incumbent)	6,028	100.0
Total votes		6,028	100.0

Republican primary results
Party	Candidate	Votes	%
Republican	Michael M. Lupo	3,799	100.0
Total votes		3,799	100.0

2022 Illinois' 55th representative district election results
Party	Candidate	Votes	%
Democratic	Martin J. Moylan (incumbent)	16,195	54.42
Republican	Michael M. Lupo	13,563	45.58
Total votes		29,758	100.0
Democratic hold			

=== District 56 ===
The district had been represented by Democrat Michelle Mussman since January 12, 2011. Mussman was re-elected with 57.6% of the vote in 2020. E. Dale Litney, a self-employed sports official, was the Republican nominee.

Democratic primary results
Party	Candidate	Votes	%
Democratic	Michelle Mussman (incumbent)	6,282	100.0
Total votes		6,282	100.0

Republican primary results
Party	Candidate	Votes	%
Republican	E. Dale Litney	3,628	100.0
Total votes		3,628	100.0

2022 Illinois' 56th representative district election results
Party	Candidate	Votes	%
Democratic	Michelle Mussman (incumbent)	16,504	60.16
Republican	E. Dale Litney	10,931	39.84
Total votes		27,435	100.0
Democratic hold			

=== District 57 ===
The district had been represented by Democrat Jonathan Carroll since his appointment on October 4, 2017. Carroll was re-elected unopposed in 2020. Rory Welch, a consultant, was the Republican nominee.

Democratic primary results
Party	Candidate	Votes	%
Democratic	Jonathan Carroll (incumbent)	8,255	100.0
Total votes		8,255	100.0

Republican primary results
Party	Candidate	Votes	%
Republican	Rory Welch	3,840	100.0
Total votes		3,840	100.0

2022 Illinois' 57th representative district election results
Party	Candidate	Votes	%
Democratic	Jonathan Carroll (incumbent)	22,553	63.63
Republican	Rory Welch	12,889	36.37
Total votes		35,442	100.0
Democratic hold			

=== District 58 ===
The district had been represented by Democrat Bob Morgan since January 9, 2019. Morgan was re-elected unopposed in 2020. Mike Clark, a construction manager, was the Republican nominee.

Democratic primary results
Party	Candidate	Votes	%
Democratic	Bob Morgan (incumbent)	10,622	100.0
Total votes		10,622	100.0

Republican primary results
Party	Candidate	Votes	%
Republican	Michael J. Clark (write-in)	450	100.0
Total votes		450	100.0

2022 Illinois' 58th representative district election results
Party	Candidate	Votes	%
Democratic	Bob Morgan (incumbent)	31,269	70.22
Republican	Mike Clark	13,260	29.78
Total votes		44,529	100.0
Democratic hold			

=== District 59 ===
The district had been represented by Democrat Daniel Didech since January 9, 2019. Didech was re-elected unopposed in 2020. Charles Roeske, an SOC manager, was the Republican nominee.

Democratic primary results
Party	Candidate	Votes	%
Democratic	Daniel Didech (incumbent)	6,430	100.0
Total votes		6,430	100.0

2022 Illinois' 59th representative district election results
Party	Candidate	Votes	%
Democratic	Daniel Didech (incumbent)	20,619	66.48
Republican	Charles Roeske	10,398	33.52
Total votes		31,017	100.0
Democratic hold			

=== District 60 ===
The district had been represented by Democrat Rita Mayfield since her appointment in July 2010. Mayfield was re-elected unopposed in 2020. She faced no other ballot-listed candidates in the general election.

Democratic primary results
Party	Candidate	Votes	%
Democratic	Rita Mayfield (incumbent)	4,295	100.0
Total votes		4,295	100.0

2022 Illinois' 60th representative district election results
Party	Candidate	Votes	%
Democratic	Rita Mayfield (incumbent)	14,104	100.0
Total votes		14,104	100.0
Democratic hold			

=== District 61 ===
The district had been represented by Democrat Joyce Mason since January 9, 2019. Mason was re-elected with 55.1% of the vote in 2020. Peter Petteroni, an English teacher at Round Lake High School, was the Republican nominee.

Democratic primary results
Party	Candidate	Votes	%
Democratic	Joyce Mason (incumbent)	7,391	100.0
Total votes		7,391	100.0

Republican primary results
Party	Candidate	Votes	%
Republican	Peter Petteroni	6,216	100.0
Total votes		6,216	100.0

2022 Illinois' 61st representative district election results
Party	Candidate	Votes	%
Democratic	Joyce Mason (incumbent)	18,383	56.33
Republican	Peter Petteroni	14,250	43.67
Total votes		32,633	100.0
Democratic hold			

=== District 62 ===
The district had been represented by Democrat Sam Yingling since January 9, 2013. Yingling was re-elected with 56.9% of the vote in 2020. Yingling retired to run for state senator in the 31st district. Laura Faver Dias, a Grayslake board member; Thomas Maillard, a director of government operations for Waukegan; and Terry Wilke, a Lake County board member all ran for the Democratic nomination. Laura Faver Dias won the nomination. Adam Shores, another Grayslake board member, was the Republican nominee.

Democratic primary results
Party	Candidate	Votes	%
Democratic	Laura Faver Dias	5,139	69.60
Democratic	Thomas Maillard	1,488	20.15
Democratic	Terry Wilkie	757	10.25
Total votes		7,384	100.0

Republican primary results
Party	Candidate	Votes	%
Republican	Adam R. Shores	4,596	100.0
Total votes		4,596	100.0

2022 Illinois' 62nd representative district election results
Party	Candidate	Votes	%
Democratic	Laura Faver Dias	18,528	58.12
Republican	Adam R. Shores	13,352	41.88
Total votes		31,880	100.0
Democratic hold			

=== District 63 ===
The district had been represented by Republican Steve Reick since January 11, 2017. Reick was re-elected with 54.8% of the vote in 2020. Brian Myers, a retired teacher, was the Democratic nominee.

Republican primary results
Party	Candidate	Votes	%
Republican	Steven Reick (incumbent)	8,822	100.0
Total votes		8,822	100.0

Democratic primary results
Party	Candidate	Votes	%
Democratic	Brian D Meyers	5,193	100.0
Total votes		5,193	100.0

2022 Illinois' 63rd representative district election results
Party	Candidate	Votes	%
Republican	Steven Reick (incumbent)	21,620	52.87
Democratic	Brian D Meyers	19,275	47.13
Total votes		40,895	100.0
Republican hold			

=== District 64 ===
The district had been represented by Republican Tom Weber since January 9, 2019. Weber was re-elected with 59.8% of the vote in 2020. Rick Konter, a retired farmer, was the Democratic nominee.

Republican primary results
Party	Candidate	Votes	%
Republican	Tom Weber (incumbent)	9,311	100.0
Total votes		9,311	100.0

2022 Illinois' 64th representative district election results
Party	Candidate	Votes	%
Republican	Tom Weber (incumbent)	24,458	60.53
Democratic	Rick Konter	15,950	39.47
Total votes		40,408	100.0
Republican hold			

=== District 65 ===
The district had been represented by Republican Dan Ugaste since January 9, 2019. Ugaste was seeking a third term. Democrats slated scientist and small business owner Linda Robertson for the district. Ugaste's campaign committee chair endorsed Robertson over Ugaste in the race.

Republican primary results
Party	Candidate	Votes	%
Republican	Dan Ugaste (incumbent)	8,151	100.0
Total votes		8,151	100.0

2022 Illinois' 65th representative district election results
Party	Candidate	Votes	%
Republican	Dan Ugaste (incumbent)	23,927	54.20
Democratic	Linda R Robertson	20,221	45.80
Total votes		44,148	100.0
Republican hold			

=== District 66 ===
The district had been represented by Democrat Suzanne Ness since January 13, 2021. Ness was first elected with 52.0% of the vote in 2020. Connie Cain, an accountant, and Dundee Township Supervisor Arin Thrower ran for the Republican nomination. Cain won the nomination.

Democratic primary results
Party	Candidate	Votes	%
Democratic	Suzanne M. Ness (incumbent)	5,741	100.0
Total votes		5,741	100.0

Republican primary results
Party	Candidate	Votes	%
Republican	Connie Cain	3,441	50.51
Republican	Arin Thrower	3,371	49.49
Total votes		6,812	100.0

2022 Illinois' 66th representative district election results
Party	Candidate	Votes	%
Democratic	Suzanne M. Ness (incumbent)	19,645	53.17
Republican	Connie Cain	17,302	46.83
Total votes		36,947	100.0
Democratic hold			

=== District 67 ===
The district had been represented by Democrat Maurice West since January 9, 2019. West was re-elected with 66.5% of the vote in 2020. Glen Oland, a salesman, was the Republican nominee.

Democratic primary results
Party	Candidate	Votes	%
Democratic	Maurice A. West II (incumbent)	4,392	100.0
Total votes		4,392	100.0

Republican primary results
Party	Candidate	Votes	%
Republican	Glen Oland	4,349	100.0
Total votes		4,349	100.0

2022 Illinois' 67th representative district election results
Party	Candidate	Votes	%
Democratic	Maurice A. West II (incumbent)	13,880	55.58
Republican	Glen Oland	11,094	44.42
Total votes		24,974	100.0
Democratic hold			

=== District 68 ===
The district had been represented by Democrat Dave Vella since January 13, 2021. Vella was first elected with 50.2% of the vote in 2020, or by 239 votes. Jonathan Ojeda, a firefighter, was the Republican nominee.

Democratic primary results
Party	Candidate	Votes	%
Democratic	Dave Vella (incumbent)	4,979	100.0
Total votes		4,979	100.0

Republican primary results
Party	Candidate	Votes	%
Republican	Jonathan Ojeda	6,264	100.0
Total votes		6,264	100.0

2022 Illinois' 68th representative district election results
Party	Candidate	Votes	%
Democratic	Dave Vella (incumbent)	17,563	54.73
Republican	Jonathan Ojeda	14,527	45.27
Total votes		32,090	100.0
Democratic hold			

=== District 69 ===
The district had been represented by Republican Joe Sosnowski since January 12, 2011. Sosnowski was re-elected unopposed in 2020. Peter Janko, a marketing research analyst, was the Democratic nominee.

Republican primary results
Party	Candidate	Votes	%
Republican	Joe C. Sosnowski (incumbent)	10,199	100.0
Total votes		10,199	100.0

Democratic primary results
Party	Candidate	Votes	%
Democratic	Peter Janko	3,776	100.0
Total votes		3,776	100.0

2022 Illinois' 69th representative district election results
Party	Candidate	Votes	%
Republican	Joe C. Sosnowski (incumbent)	24,663	61.41
Democratic	Peter Janko	15,501	38.59
Total votes		40,164	100.0
Republican hold			

=== District 70 ===
The district had been represented by Republican Jeff Keicher since his appointment on July 2, 2018. Keicher was re-elected with 57.7% of the vote in 2020. He faced no other ballot-listed candidates in the general election.

Republican primary results
Party	Candidate	Votes	%
Republican	Jeff Keicher (incumbent)	9,804	100.0
Total votes		9,804	100.0

2022 Illinois' 70th representative district election results
Party	Candidate	Votes	%
Republican	Jeff Keicher (incumbent)	33,748	100.0
Total votes		33,748	100.0
Republican hold			

=== District 71 ===
The district had been represented by Republican Tony McCombie since January 11, 2017. McCombie was re-elected with 61.6% of the vote in 2020. McCombie was redistricted to the 89th representative district and won re-election in her new boundaries. Representative Daniel Swanson was redistricted from the 74th representative district and defeated Matthew Rauschert, an industrial designer, for the Republican nomination. Chris Demink, a retired electrician, was the Democratic nominee.

Republican primary results
Party	Candidate	Votes	%
Republican	Dan Swanson	5,490	66.76
Republican	Matthew Rauschert	2,733	33.24
Total votes		8,223	100.0

Democratic primary results
Party	Candidate	Votes	%
Democratic	Christopher Demink	4,699	100.0
Total votes		4,699	100.0

2022 Illinois' 71st representative district election results
Party	Candidate	Votes	%
Republican	Dan Swanson	23,070	62.14
Democratic	Christopher Demink	14,058	37.86
Total votes		37,128	100.0
Republican hold			

=== District 72 ===
The district had been represented by Democrat Michael Halpin since January 10, 2017. Halpin was re-elected with 59.7% of the vote in 2020. He ran for and was elected state Senator from the 36th legislative district. Thurgood Brooks, a community activist; Jeff Deppe, a Rock Island County board member; and Gregg Johnson, a retired Illinois Department of Corrections officer, all ran for the Democratic nomination. Johnson won the nomination. Tom Martens, a former military police officer in the United States Army Reserve, was the Republican nominee.

Democratic primary results
Party	Candidate	Votes	%
Democratic	Gregg Johnson	2,843	35.63
Democratic	Thurgood Brooks	2,820	35.34
Democratic	Jeffrey D. Deppe	2,316	29.03
Total votes		7,979	100.0

Republican primary results
Party	Candidate	Votes	%
Republican	Tom Martens	3,527	100.0
Total votes		3,527	100.0

2022 Illinois' 72nd representative district election results
Party	Candidate	Votes	%
Democratic	Gregg Johnson	19,784	60.19
Republican	Tom Martens	13,086	39.81
Total votes		32,870	100.0
Democratic hold			

=== District 73 ===
The district had been represented by Republican Ryan Spain since January 11, 2017. Spain was re-elected unopposed in 2020. He faced no other ballot-listed candidates in the general election.

Republican primary results
Party	Candidate	Votes	%
Republican	Ryan Spain (incumbent)	10,266	100.0
Total votes		10,266	100.0

2022 Illinois' 73rd representative district election results
Party	Candidate	Votes	%
Republican	Ryan Spain (incumbent)	36,800	100.0
Total votes		36,800	100.0
Republican hold			

=== District 74 ===
The district had been represented by Republican Daniel Swanson since January 11, 2017. Swanson was re-elected with 71.0% of the vote in 2020. Swanson was redistricted to and re-elected as state Representative in the 71st representative district. Bradley Fritts, a farmer, defeated Dixon mayor Li Arellano, Jr. for the Republican nomination. He faced no other ballot-listed candidates in the general election. Upon his inauguration, Fritts became the youngest elected state representative in Illinois and the first to be born in the 21st century.

Republican primary results
Party	Candidate	Votes	%
Republican	Bradley J. Fritts	6,183	57.56
Republican	Liandro "Li" Arellano, Jr.	4,558	42.44
Total votes		10,741	100.0

2022 Illinois' 74th representative district election results
Party	Candidate	Votes	%
Republican	Bradley J. Fritts	29,932	100.0
Total votes		29,932	100.0
Republican hold			

=== District 75 ===
The district had been represented by Republican David Welter since his appointment in July 2016. Welter was re-elected with 100.0% of the vote in 2020. Welter was defeated by Jed Davis, a civil engineer, for the Republican nomination. Heidi Henry, a small business owner, was the Democratic nominee.

Republican primary results
Party	Candidate	Votes	%
Republican	Jed Davis	6,412	54.41
Republican	David Allen Welter (incumbent)	5,372	45.59
Total votes		11,784	100.0

2022 Illinois' 75th representative district election results
Party	Candidate	Votes	%
Republican	Jed Davis	24,296	61.01
Democratic	Heidi Henry	15,530	38.99
Total votes		39,826	100.0
Republican hold			

== Districts 76–100 ==
=== District 76 ===
The district had been represented by Democrat Lance Yednock since January 9, 2019. Yednock was re-elected with 54.4% of the vote in 2020. Jason Haskell, a construction manager, was the Republican nominee.

Democratic primary results
Party	Candidate	Votes	%
Democratic	Lance Yednock (incumbent)	5,123	100.0
Total votes		5,123	100.0

Republican primary results
Party	Candidate	Votes	%
Republican	Jason Haskell	5,346	100.0
Total votes		5,346	100.0

2022 Illinois' 76th representative district election results
Party	Candidate	Votes	%
Democratic	Lance Yednock (incumbent)	20,156	57.50
Republican	Jason Haskell	14,896	42.50
Total votes		35,052	100.0
Democratic hold			

=== District 77 ===
The district had been represented by Democrat Kathleen Willis since January 9, 2013. Willis was re-elected with 67.2% of the vote in 2020. Willis was defeated by Norma Hernandez, a Triton College trustee, for the Democratic nomination. Anthony Airdo, a project manager and perennial candidate for the 77th district, was the Republican nominee.

Norma Hernandez (D)

U.S. representatives

- Jesús "Chuy" García, representative from Illinois's 4th congressional district

Democratic primary results
Party	Candidate	Votes	%
Democratic	Norma Hernandez	2,484	51.83
Democratic	Kathleen Willis (incumbent)	2,309	48.17
Total votes		4,793	100.0

Republican primary results
Party	Candidate	Votes	%
Republican	Anthony Airdo	2,686	100.0
Total votes		2,686	100.0

2022 Illinois' 77th representative district election results
Party	Candidate	Votes	%
Democratic	Norma Hernandez	10,588	57.51
Republican	Anthony Airdo	7,822	42.49
Total votes		18,410	100.0
Democratic hold			

=== District 78 ===
The district had been represented by Democrat Camille Lilly since her appointment in April 2010. Lilly was re-elected with 83.3% of the vote in 2020. She faced no other ballot-listed candidates in the general election.

Democratic primary results
Party	Candidate	Votes	%
Democratic	Camille Lilly (incumbent)	15,298	100.0
Total votes		15,298	100.0

2022 Illinois' 78th representative district election results
Party	Candidate	Votes	%
Democratic	Camille Lilly (incumbent)	33,801	100.0
Total votes		33,801	100.0
Democratic hold			

=== District 79 ===
The district had been represented by Republican Jackie Haas since December 8, 2020. Haas was first elected with 63.8% of the vote in 2020. Erin Slone, a Park Forest village trustee, defeated Robert Ellington-Snipes, a supervisor at Kankakee High School, for the Democratic nomination.

Republican primary results
Party	Candidate	Votes	%
Republican	Jackie Haas (incumbent)	6,250	100.0
Total votes		6,250	100.0

Democratic primary results
Party	Candidate	Votes	%
Democratic	Erin Slone	2,793	64.71
Democratic	Robert S. Ellington-Snipes	1,523	35.29
Total votes		4,316	100.0

2022 Illinois' 79th representative district election results
Party	Candidate	Votes	%
Republican	Jackie Haas (incumbent)	19,652	58.30
Democratic	Erin Slone	14,054	41.70
Total votes		33,706	100.0
Republican hold			

=== District 80 ===
The district had been represented by Democrat Anthony DeLuca since his appointment in March 2009. DeLuca was re-elected with 79.8% of the vote in 2020. Al Kuypers Sr. was the Republican nominee.

Democratic primary results
Party	Candidate	Votes	%
Democratic	Anthony DeLuca (incumbent)	5,998	100.0
Total votes		5,998	100.0

2022 Illinois' 80th representative district election results
Party	Candidate	Votes	%
Democratic	Anthony DeLuca (incumbent)	18,749	57.06
Republican	Al Kuypers Sr.	14,112	42.94
Total votes		32,861	100.0
Democratic hold			

=== District 81 ===
The district had been represented by Democrat Anne Stava-Murray since January 9, 2019. Stava-Murray was re-elected with 52.6% of the vote in 2020. She ran for re-election in the 81st district and defeated Republican nominee and Naperville councilman Paul Leong in the general election.

Democratic primary results
Party	Candidate	Votes	%
Democratic	Anne Stava-Murray (incumbent)	10,256	100.0
Total votes		10,256	100.0

Republican primary results
Party	Candidate	Votes	%
Republican	Paul Leong	7,634	100.0
Total votes		7,634	100.0

2022 Illinois' 81st representative district election results
Party	Candidate	Votes	%
Democratic	Anne Stava-Murray (incumbent)	27,060	58.20
Republican	Paul Leong	19,431	41.80
Total votes		46,491	100.0
Democratic hold			

=== District 82 ===
The district had been represented by Republican Leader Jim Durkin since his January 2006 appointment. Durkin was re-elected with 65.8% of the vote in 2020. He faced no other ballot-listed candidates in the general election.

Republican primary results
Party	Candidate	Votes	%
Republican	Jim Durkin (incumbent)	8,913	100.0
Total votes		8,913	100.0

2022 Illinois' 82nd representative district election results
Party	Candidate	Votes	%
Republican	Jim Durkin (incumbent)	33,625	100.0
Total votes		33,625	100.0
Republican hold			

=== District 83 ===
The district had been represented by Democrat Barbara Hernandez. She was redistricted to the 50th representative district and won re-election in her new boundaries. Matt Hanson, a former Kane County board member, defeated Arad Boxenbaum, a graduate of DePaul University, for the Democratic nomination. State Representative Keith R. Wheeler was redistricted from the 50th representative district and was the Republican nominee.

Democratic primary results
Party	Candidate	Votes	%
Democratic	Matt Hanson	4,412	67.19
Democratic	Arad Boxenbaum	2,154	32.81
Total votes		6,566	100.0

Republican primary results
Party	Candidate	Votes	%
Republican	Keith R. Wheeler	6,647	100.0
Total votes		6,647	100.0

2022 Illinois' 83rd representative district election results
Party	Candidate	Votes	%
Democratic	Matt Hanson	20,732	53.73
Republican	Keith R. Wheeler	17,855	46.27
Total votes		38,587	100.0
Democratic hold			

=== District 84 ===
The district had been represented by Democrat Stephanie Kifowit since January 9, 2013. Kifowit was re-elected unopposed in 2020. Joe West, a former Oswego village trustee, was the Republican nominee.

Democratic primary results
Party	Candidate	Votes	%
Democratic	Stephanie A. Kifowit (incumbent)	5,528	100.0
Total votes		5,528	100.0

Republican primary results
Party	Candidate	Votes	%
Republican	Joe West	3,849	100.0
Total votes		3,849	100.0

2022 Illinois' 84th representative district election results
Party	Candidate	Votes	%
Democratic	Stephanie A. Kifowit (incumbent)	19,219	65.75
Republican	Joe West	10,013	34.25
Total votes		29,232	100.0
Democratic hold			

=== District 85 ===
The district had been represented by Democrat Dagmara Avelar since January 13, 2021. Avelar was first elected with 59.0% of the vote in 2020. Christ Metcalfe, an operations manager, was the Republican nominee.

Democratic primary results
Party	Candidate	Votes	%
Democratic	Dagmara "Dee" Avelar (incumbent)	6,554	100.0
Total votes		6,554	100.0

2022 Illinois' 85th representative district election results
Party	Candidate	Votes	%
Democratic	Dagmara "Dee" Avelar (incumbent)	17,644	57.62
Republican	Christ Metcalfe	12,975	42.38
Total votes		30,619	100.0
Democratic hold			

=== District 86 ===
The district had been represented by Democrat Larry Walsh Jr. since his appointment in April 2012. Walsh Jr. was re-elected unopposed in 2020. Scott Greene, a truck driver; James Lanham, who works in private security services; and Dinora Ruiz, a seamstress, all ran for the Republican nomination. Greene won the nomination.

Democratic primary results
Party	Candidate	Votes	%
Democratic	Lawrence "Larry" Walsh, Jr. (incumbent)	5,823	100.0
Total votes		5,823	100.0

Republican primary results
Party	Candidate	Votes	%
Republican	Scott F. Greene	2,733	54.61
Republican	James Lanham	1,374	27.45
Republican	Dinora Ruiz	898	17.94
Total votes		5,005	100.0

2022 Illinois' 86th representative district election results
Party	Candidate	Votes	%
Democratic	Lawrence "Larry" Walsh, Jr. (incumbent)	16,777	57.33
Republican	Scott F. Greene	12,487	42.67
Total votes		29,264	100.0
Democratic hold			

=== District 87 ===
The district had been represented by Republican Tim Butler since his appointment in March 2015. Butler was re-elected with 84.5% of the vote in 2020. He was redistricted to the 95th representative district and ran for re-election in his new boundaries. Bill Hauter, an emergency room physician, defeated Tazewell County Treasurer Mary Burress for the Republican nomination. Hauter faced no other ballot-listed candidates in the general election. Butler resigned his seat in the 87th district on December 31, 2022. Jason Huffman, a Menard County sheriff's deputy, was appointed to the district from January 1, 2023, to January 11, 2023, until Hauter's swearing-in.

Republican primary results
Party	Candidate	Votes	%
Republican	William E Hauter	8,828	56.82
Republican	Mary Burress	6,709	43.18
Total votes		15,537	100.0

2022 Illinois' 87th representative district election results
Party	Candidate	Votes	%
Republican	William E Hauter	37,568	100.0
Total votes		37,568	100.0
Republican hold			

=== District 88 ===
The district had been represented by Republican Keith P. Sommer since January 13, 1999. Sommer was re-elected with 60.1% of the vote in 2020. He announced he would not seek re-election on December 22, 2021. State Representative Dan Caulkins was re-districted from the 101st district and was the Republican nominee. He faced no other ballot-listed candidates in the general election. Keith Sommer resigned his seat on December 31, 2022. Bill Hauter, who was elected to the 87th representative district, filled out the remainder of Sommer's term in the 88th district from January 1, 2023, to January 11, 2023, until his inauguration as state representative for the 87th district.

Republican primary results
Party	Candidate	Votes	%
Republican	Dan Caulkins	13,853	100.0
Total votes		13,853	100.0

2022 Illinois' 88th representative district election results
Party	Candidate	Votes	%
Republican	Dan Caulkins	37,580	100.0
Total votes		37,580	100.0
Republican hold			

=== District 89 ===
The district had been represented by Republican Andrew Chesney since December 5, 2018. Chesney was elected to the Illinois Senate in the 45th legislative district. 71st district state Representative Tony McCombie defeated Victoria Onorato, a retired police officer, for the Republican nomination. McCombie faced no other ballot-listed candidates in the general election.

Republican primary results
Party	Candidate	Votes	%
Republican	Tony McCombie	9,541	75.01
Republican	Victoria Onorato	3,179	24.99
Total votes		12,720	100.0

2022 Illinois' 89th representative district election results
Party	Candidate	Votes	%
Republican	Tony McCombie	37,363	100.0
Total votes		37,363	100.0
Republican hold			

=== District 90 ===
The district had been represented by Republican Tom Demmer since January 9, 2013. Demmer was re-elected with 67.3% of the vote in 2020. He retired to run for treasurer in the 2022 election. Former state Representative John Cabello defeated Roscoe Village president Mark Szula for the Republican nomination. Cabello faced no other ballot-listed candidates in the general election.

Republican primary results
Party	Candidate	Votes	%
Republican	John M. Cabello	8,864	73.63
Republican	Mark W. Szula	3,175	26.37
Total votes		12,039	100.0

2022 Illinois' 90th representative district election results
Party	Candidate	Votes	%
Republican	John M. Cabello	32,352	100.0
Total votes		32,352	100.0
Republican hold			

=== District 91 ===
The district had been represented by Republican Mark Luft since January 13, 2021. Luft was first elected with 63.2% of the vote in 2020. He was redistricted to the 93rd representative and ran for re-election in his new boundaries. Normal Town Councilman Scott Preston defeated Jim Fisher, a retired farmer, for the Republican nomination. McLean County board member Sharon Chung defeated Karla Bailey-Preston, a small business owner, for the Democratic nomination.

Republican primary results
Party	Candidate	Votes	%
Republican	Scott Preston	4,874	62.50
Republican	James S. Fisher	2,924	37.50
Total votes		7,798	100.0

Democratic primary results
Party	Candidate	Votes	%
Democratic	Sharon Chung	3,871	62.87
Democratic	Kara Bailey-Smith	2,286	37.13
Total votes		6,157	100.0

2022 Illinois' 91st representative district election results
Party	Candidate	Votes	%
Democratic	Sharon Chung	19,032	52.25
Republican	Scott Preston	17,391	47.75
Total votes		36,423	100.0
Democratic gain from Republican			

=== District 92 ===
The district had been represented by Democrat Jehan Gordon-Booth since January 14, 2009. Gordon-Booth was re-elected with 74.5% of the vote in 2020. Ben Watt, a family pastor, was the Republican nominee.

Democratic primary results
Party	Candidate	Votes	%
Democratic	Jehan Gordon-Booth (incumbent)	5,545	100.0
Total votes		5,545	100.0

Republican primary results
Party	Candidate	Votes	%
Republican	Benjamin Watt	4,020	100.0
Total votes		4,020	100.0

2022 Illinois' 92nd representative district election results
Party	Candidate	Votes	%
Democratic	Jehan Gordon-Booth (incumbent)	18,725	62.48
Republican	Benjamin Watt	11,245	37.52
Total votes		29,970	100.0
Democratic hold			

=== District 93 ===
The district had been represented by Republican Norine Hammond since her appointment in December 2010. Hammond was re-elected with 65.9% of the vote in 2020. She was redistricted to the 94th Representative district and won re-election in her new boundaries. Travis Weaver, a former business manager, defeated 91st Representative district state representative Mark Luft for the Republican nomination. Weaver faced no other ballot-listed candidates in the general election.

Republican primary results
Party	Candidate	Votes	%
Republican	Travis Weaver	7,484	63.71
Republican	Mark A. Luft	4,263	36.29
Total votes		11,747	100.0

2022 Illinois' 93rd representative district election results
Party	Candidate	Votes	%
Republican	Travis Weaver	33,189	100.0
Total votes		33,189	100.0
Republican hold			

=== District 94 ===
The district had been represented by Republican Randy Frese since January 14, 2015. Frese was re-elected with 76.3% of the vote in 2020. He was redistricted to the 99th Representative district and won re-election in his new boundaries. 93rd Representative district state representative Norine Hammond was the Republican nominee and faced no other ballot-listed candidates in the general election.

Republican primary results
Party	Candidate	Votes	%
Republican	Norine K. Hammond	12,451	100.0
Total votes		12,451	100.0

2022 Illinois' 94th representative district election results
Party	Candidate	Votes	%
Republican	Norine K. Hammond	37,566	100.0
Total votes		37,566	100.0
Republican hold			

=== District 95 ===
The district had been represented by Republican Avery Bourne since her appointment in February 2015. Bourne was re-elected with 70.1% of the vote in 2020. Bourne ran for the Illinois Lieutenant Governor Republican nomination. 87th Representative district state representative Tim Butler defeated Kent Gray, a former president Trump administration official, for the Republican nomination. Butler faced no other ballot-listed candidates in the general election.

Republican primary results
Party	Candidate	Votes	%
Republican	Tim Butler	7,407	73.59
Republican	Kent Gray	2,658	26.41
Total votes		10,065	100.0

2022 Illinois' 95th representative district election results
Party	Candidate	Votes	%
Republican	Tim Butler	36,173	100.0
Total votes		36,173	100.0
Republican hold			

=== District 96 ===
The district had been represented by Democrat Sue Scherer since January 9, 2013. Scherer was re-elected with 51.5% of the vote in 2020. Lisa Smith, a pediatric nurse practitioner, defeated Prescott Paulin, a former Department of Defense special advisor, for the Republican nomination.

Democratic primary results
Party	Candidate	Votes	%
Democratic	Sue Scherer (incumbent)	5,001	100.0
Total votes		5,001	100.0

Republican primary results
Party	Candidate	Votes	%
Republican	Lisa Smith	3,725	65.99
Republican	Prescott Paulin	1,920	34.01
Total votes		5,645	100.0

2022 Illinois' 96th representative district election results
Party	Candidate	Votes	%
Democratic	Sue Scherer (incumbent)	17,916	58.07
Republican	Lisa Smith	12,938	41.93
Total votes		30,854	100.0
Democratic hold			

=== District 97 ===
The district had been represented by Republican Mark Batinick since January 14, 2015. Batinick was re-elected with 52.0% of the vote in 2020. On November 3, 2021, Batinick announced he would not seek another term in office. Michelle Smith, the Plainfield Township Clerk, was the Republican nominee. Tom McCullagh withdrew from the Republican primary "after a police report from last year surfaced in which he was accused of having an inappropriate relationship with an underage person." Harry Benton, a Plainfield village trustee and Democratic nominee in 2020, was the Democratic nominee.

Republican primary results
Party	Candidate	Votes	%
Republican	Michelle Smith	5,489	100.0
Total votes		5,489	100.0

Democratic primary results
Party	Candidate	Votes	%
Democratic	Harry Benton	4,827	100.0
Total votes		4,827	100.0

2022 Illinois' 97th representative district election results
Party	Candidate	Votes	%
Democratic	Harry Benton	18,095	51.66
Republican	Michelle Smith	16,932	48.34
Total votes		35,027	100.0
Democratic gain from Republican			

=== District 98 ===
The district had been represented by Democrat Natalie Manley since January 9, 2013. Manley was re-elected unopposed in 2020. She defeated Barry Haywood for the Democratic nomination. Donna Russell, a project management professional, was the Republican nominee.

Democratic primary results
Party	Candidate	Votes	%
Democratic	Natalie A. Manley (incumbent)	5,804	89.03
Democratic	Barry Haywood	715	10.97
Total votes		6,519	100.0

2022 Illinois' 98th representative district election results
Party	Candidate	Votes	%
Democratic	Natalie A. Manley (incumbent)	19,268	59.76
Republican	Donna Russell	12,973	40.24
Total votes		32,241	100.0
Democratic hold			

=== District 99 ===
The district had been represented by Republican Mike Murphy since January 9, 2019. Murphy resigned during his term and was replaced by Sandy Hamilton. Hamilton ran for the Illinois Senate in the 48th Legislative district. 94th Representative district state representative Randy Frese was the Republican nominee and faced no other ballot-listed candidates in the general election.

Republican primary results
Party	Candidate	Votes	%
Republican	Randy E. Frese	13,323	100.0
Total votes		13,323	100.0

2022 Illinois' 99th representative district election results
Party	Candidate	Votes	%
Republican	Randy E. Frese	33,192	100.0
Total votes		33,192	100.0
Republican hold			

=== District 100 ===
The district had been represented by Republican C. D. Davidsmeyer since his appointment in December 2012. Davidsmeyer was re-elected with 75.1% of the vote in 2020. He faced no other ballot-listed candidates in the general election.

Republican primary results
Party	Candidate	Votes	%
Republican	Christopher "C.D." Davidsmeyer (incumbent)	14,112	100.0
Total votes		14,112	100.0

2022 Illinois' 100th representative district election results
Party	Candidate	Votes	%
Republican	Christopher "C.D." Davidsmeyer (incumbent)	40,156	100.0
Total votes		40,156	100.0
Republican hold			

== Districts 101–118 ==
=== District 101 ===
The district had been represented by Republican Dan Caulkins since January 9, 2019. Caulkins was re-elected unopposed in 2020. He was redistricted to the 88th Representative district and won re-election in his new boundaries. 110th Representative district state representative Chris Miller was the Republican nominee and faced no other ballot-listed candidates in the general election.

Republican primary results
Party	Candidate	Votes	%
Republican	Chris Miller	14,289	100.0
Total votes		14,289	100.0

2022 Illinois' 101st representative district election results
Party	Candidate	Votes	%
Republican	Chris Miller	33,251	100.0
Total votes		33,251	100.0
Republican hold			

=== District 102 ===
The district had been represented by Republican Brad Halbrook since January 11, 2017, previously serving the 110th district in the Illinois House of Representatives from April 2012 to January 14, 2015. Halbrook was re-elected with 71.6% of the vote in 2020. He was redistricted to the 107th Representative district and won re-election in his new boundaries. 109th Representative district state representative Adam Niemerg was the Republican nominee and faced no other ballot-listed candidates in the general election.

Republican primary results
Party	Candidate	Votes	%
Republican	Adam M Niemerg	15,729	100.0
Total votes		15,729	100.0

2022 Illinois' 102nd representative district election results
Party	Candidate	Votes	%
Republican	Adam M Niemerg	37,753	100.0
Total votes		37,753	100.0
Republican hold			

=== District 103 ===
The district had been represented by Democrat Carol Ammons since January 14, 2015. Ammons was re-elected with 78.7% of the vote in 2020. She faced no other ballot-listed candidates in the general election.

Republican primary results
Party	Candidate	Votes	%
Democratic	Carol Ammons (incumbent)	6,729	100.0
Total votes		6,729	100.0

2022 Illinois' 103rd representative district election results
Party	Candidate	Votes	%
Democratic	Carol Ammons (incumbent)	22,695	100.0
Total votes		22,695	100.0
Democratic hold			

=== District 104 ===
The district had been represented by Republican Michael Marron since his appointment on September 7, 2018. Marron was re-elected with 58.8% of the vote in 2020. Cynthia Cunningham, founder of Cobalt Creek Consulting and candidate in 2020, was the Democratic nominee.

Republican primary results
Party	Candidate	Votes	%
Republican	Mike Marron (incumbent)	7,893	100.0
Total votes		7,893	100.0

Democratic primary results
Party	Candidate	Votes	%
Democratic	Cynthia E. Cunningham	5,324	100.0
Total votes		5,324	100.0

2022 Illinois' 104th representative district election results
Party	Candidate	Votes	%
Republican	Mike Marron (incumbent)	19,613	54.02
Democratic	Cynthia E. Cunningham	16,695	45.98
Total votes		36,308	100.0
Republican hold			

=== District 105 ===
The district had been represented by Republican Dan Brady since January 9, 2013, who formerly represented the 88th district from January 10, 2001 to January 9, 2013. Brady was re-elected with 62.7% of the vote in 2020. Brady retired to run for Illinois Secretary of State. Four candidates ran for the Republican nomination:

- Kyle Ham, former executive director of the Bloomington–Normal Economic Development Council
- Mike Kirkton, Livingston County Board member
- Don Rients, President of the Benson Fire Protection District
- Dennis Tipsword, Jr., Woodford County Sheriff's Deputy

Tipsword won the nomination and faced no other ballot-listed candidates in the general election.

Republican primary results
Party	Candidate	Votes	%
Republican	Dennis Tipsword	5,645	39.18
Republican	Kyle Ham	3,355	23.29
Republican	Mike Kirkton	3,242	22.50
Republican	Donald Ray Rients	2,166	15.03
Total votes		14,408	100.0

2022 Illinois' 105th representative district election results
Party	Candidate	Votes	%
Republican	Dennis Tipsword	36,731	100.0
Total votes		36,731	100.0
Republican hold			

=== District 106 ===
The district had been represented by Republican Tom Bennett since January 14, 2015. Bennett was re-elected unopposed in 2020. He faced no other ballot-listed candidates in the general election.

Republican primary results
Party	Candidate	Votes	%
Republican	Thomas M. Bennett (incumbent)	12,351	100.0
Total votes		12,351	100.0

2022 Illinois' 106th representative district election results
Party	Candidate	Votes	%
Republican	Thomas M. Bennett (incumbent)	34,652	100.0
Total votes		34,652	100.0
Republican hold			

=== District 107 ===
The district had been represented by Republican Blaine Wilhour since January 9, 2019. Wilhour was re-elected with 75.9% of the vote in 2020. He was redistricted to the 110th Representative district and won re-election in his new boundaries. 102nd Representative district state representative Brad Halbrook was the Republican nominee and faced no other ballot-listed candidates in the general election.

Republican primary results
Party	Candidate	Votes	%
Republican	Brad Halbrook	16,422	100.0
Total votes		16,422	100.0

2022 Illinois' 107th representative district election results
Party	Candidate	Votes	%
Republican	Brad Halbrook	38,294	100.0
Total votes		38,294	100.0
Republican hold			

=== District 108 ===
The district had been represented by Republican Charles Meier since January 9, 2013. Meier was re-elected with 73.8% of the vote in 2020. He was redistricted to the 109th Representative district and won re-election in his new boundaries. Former state representative Wayne Rosenthal was the Republican nominee and faced no other ballot-listed candidates in the general election.

Republican primary results
Party	Candidate	Votes	%
Republican	Wayne A. Rosenthal	11,372	100.0
Total votes		11,372	100.0

2022 Illinois' 108th representative district election results
Party	Candidate	Votes	%
Republican	Wayne A. Rosenthal	37,521	100.0
Total votes		37,521	100.0
Republican hold			

=== District 109 ===
The district had been represented by Republican Adam Niemerg since January 13, 2021. Niemerg was re-elected with 82.2% of the vote in 2020. He was redistricted to the 102nd Representative district and won re-election in his new boundaries. 108th Representative district state representative Charles Meier was the Republican nominee and faced no other ballot-listed candidates in the general election.

Republican primary results
Party	Candidate	Votes	%
Republican	Charles Meier	11,905	100.0
Total votes		11,905	100.0

2022 Illinois' 109th representative district election results
Party	Candidate	Votes	%
Republican	Charles Meier	39,792	100.0
Total votes		39,792	100.0
Republican hold			

=== District 110 ===
The district had been represented by Republican Chris Miller since January 9, 2019. Miller was re-elected with 76.2% of the vote in 2020. He was redistricted to the 101st Representative district and won re-election in his new boundaries. 107th Representative district state representative Blaine Wilhour was the Republican nominee and faced no other ballot-listed candidates in the general election.

Republican primary results
Party	Candidate	Votes	%
Republican	Blaine Wilhour	15,817	100.0
Total votes		15,817	100.0

2022 Illinois' 110th representative district election results
Party	Candidate	Votes	%
Republican	Blaine Wilhour	35,882	100.0
Total votes		35,882	100.0
Republican hold			

=== District 111 ===
The 111th district is located in the Metro East and include all or parts of Alton, Bethalto, East Alton, Edwardsville, Glen Carbon, Godfrey, Granite City, Hartford, Madison, Maryville, Mitchell, Pontoon Beach, Rosewood Heights, Roxana, South Roxana, and Wood River. The district had been represented by Republican Amy Elik since January 13, 2021. Elik was first elected with 54.4% of the vote in 2020. Joe Silkwood, former mayor of East Alton was the Democratic nominee.

Republican primary results
Party	Candidate	Votes	%
Republican	Amy Elik (incumbent)	7,241	100.0
Total votes		7,241	100.0

Democratic primary results
Party	Candidate	Votes	%
Democratic	Joe Silkwood	4,546	100.0
Total votes		4,546	100.0

2022 Illinois' 111th representative district election results
Party	Candidate	Votes	%
Republican	Amy Elik (incumbent)	19,933	56.47
Democratic	Joe Silkwood	15,366	43.53
Total votes		35,299	100.0
Republican hold			

=== District 112 ===
The 112th district is located in the Metro East and include parts of Caseyville, Collinsville, Edwardsville, Fairmont City, Fairview Heights, Glen Carbon, Granite City, Madison, Maryville, O'Fallon, Pontoon Beach, Roxana, Shiloh, and Swansea. The district had been represented by Democrat Katie Stuart since January 11, 2017. Stuart was re-elected with 53.7% of the vote in 2020. Jennifer Korte, a former social worker, defeated Joe Hackler, a communications and marketing professional, for the Republican nomination.

Democratic primary results
Party	Candidate	Votes	%
Democratic	Katie Stuart (incumbent)	5,324	100.0
Total votes		5,324	100.0

Republican primary results
Party	Candidate	Votes	%
Republican	Jennifer M. Korte	4,454	67.17
Republican	Joe Hackler	2,177	32.83
Total votes		6,631	100.0

2022 Illinois' 112th representative district election results
Party	Candidate	Votes	%
Democratic	Katie Stuart (incumbent)	20,666	54.22
Republican	Jennifer M. Korte	17,450	45.78
Total votes		38,116	100.0
Democratic hold			

=== District 113 ===
Democrat Jay Hoffman, who had been a member of the Illinois House of Representatives since January 9, 1991 (with a nine-month interruption in 1997), had represented the district since January 9, 2013. Hoffman was re-elected with 75.1% of the vote in 2020. Businesswoman Ashley Hunsaker was the Republican nominee.

Democratic primary results
Party	Candidate	Votes	%
Democratic	Jay Hoffman (incumbent)	5,985	100.0
Total votes		5,985	100.0

Republican primary results
Party	Candidate	Votes	%
Republican	Ashley Hunsaker	4,300	100.0
Total votes		4,300	100.0

2022 Illinois' 113th representative district election results
Party	Candidate	Votes	%
Democratic	Jay Hoffman (incumbent)	21,764	59.47
Republican	Ashley Hunsaker	14,835	40.53
Total votes		36,599	100.0
Democratic hold			

=== District 114 ===
The district had been represented by Democrat LaToya Greenwood since January 11, 2017. Greenwood was re-elected with 57.1% of the vote in 2020. Kevin Schmidt, a chiropractor, defeated Kevin Dawson, a St. Clair County board member, for the Republican nomination.

Democratic primary results
Party	Candidate	Votes	%
Democratic	LaToya N. Greenwood (incumbent)	5,806	100.0
Total votes		5,806	100.0

Republican primary results
Party	Candidate	Votes	%
Republican	Kevin Schmidt	3,848	61.23
Republican	Kevin Dawson	2,436	38.77
Total votes		6,284	100.0

2022 Illinois' 114th representative district election results
Party	Candidate	Votes	%
Republican	Kevin Schmidt	19,233	52.82
Democratic	LaToya N. Greenwood (incumbent)	17,177	47.18
Total votes		36,410	100.0
Republican gain from Democratic			

=== District 115 ===
The district had been represented by Republican Paul Jacobs since January 13, 2021. Jacobs was first elected with 77.7% of the vote in 2020. He was redistricted to the 118th Representative district and won re-election in his new boundaries. 116th Representative district state representative David Friess was the Republican nominee and faced no other ballot-listed candidates in the general election.

Republican primary results
Party	Candidate	Votes	%
Republican	David Friess	10,711	100.0
Total votes		10,711	100.0

2022 Illinois' 115th representative district election results
Party	Candidate	Votes	%
Republican	David Friess	36,834	100.0
Total votes		36,834	100.0
Republican hold			

=== District 116 ===
The district had been represented by Republican David Friess since January 13, 2021. Friess was first elected with 64.8% of the vote in 2020. He was redistricted to the 115th Representative district and won re-election in his new boundaries. 117th Representative district state representative Dave Severin was the Republican nominee and faced no other ballot-listed candidates in the general election. Gary Carter, a farm implement salesman, was removed from the Republican primary ballot and unsuccessfully ran a write-in campaign.

Republican primary results
Party	Candidate	Votes	%
Republican	Dave Severin	14,371	99.73
Write-in		39	0.27
Total votes		14,410	100.0

2022 Illinois' 116th representative district election results
Party	Candidate	Votes	%
Republican	Dave Severin	36,393	100.0
Total votes		36,393	100.0
Republican hold			

=== District 117 ===
The district had been represented by Republican Dave Severin since January 11, 2017. Severin was re-elected unopposed in 2020. He was redistricted into the 116th Representative district and won re-election in his new boundaries. 118th Representative district state representative Patrick Windhorst defeated Ron Ellis, a former Williamson County commissioner, for the Republican nomination. Windhorst faced no other ballot-listed candidates in the general election.

Republican primary results
Party	Candidate	Votes	%
Republican	Patrick Windhorst	10,962	72.72
Republican	Ron Ellis	4,113	27.28
Total votes		15,075	100.0

2022 Illinois' 117th representative district election results
Party	Candidate	Votes	%
Republican	Patrick Windhorst	35,964	100.0
Total votes		35,964	100.0
Republican hold			

=== District 118 ===
The district had been represented by Republican Patrick Windhorst since January 9, 2019. Windhorst was re-elected unopposed in 2020. He was redistricted to the 117th Representative district and won re-election in his new boundaries. 115th Representative district state representative Paul Jacobs defeated Aaron Smith, a John A. Logan College board member, for the Republican nomination. Van Ikner, a community activist, was the Democratic nominee.

Republican primary results
Party	Candidate	Votes	%
Republican	Paul Jacobs	6,137	68.29
Republican	Aaron Robert Smith	2,850	31.71
Total votes		8,987	100.0

Democratic primary results
Party	Candidate	Votes	%
Democratic	Van Ikner (write-in)	455	100.0
Total votes		455	100.0

2022 Illinois' 118th representative district election results
Party	Candidate	Votes	%
Republican	Paul Jacobs	22,613	61.35
Democratic	Van Ikner	14,249	38.65
Total votes		36,862	100.0
Republican hold			

== See also ==
- List of Illinois state legislatures
