= Deanne Mazzochi =

American politician

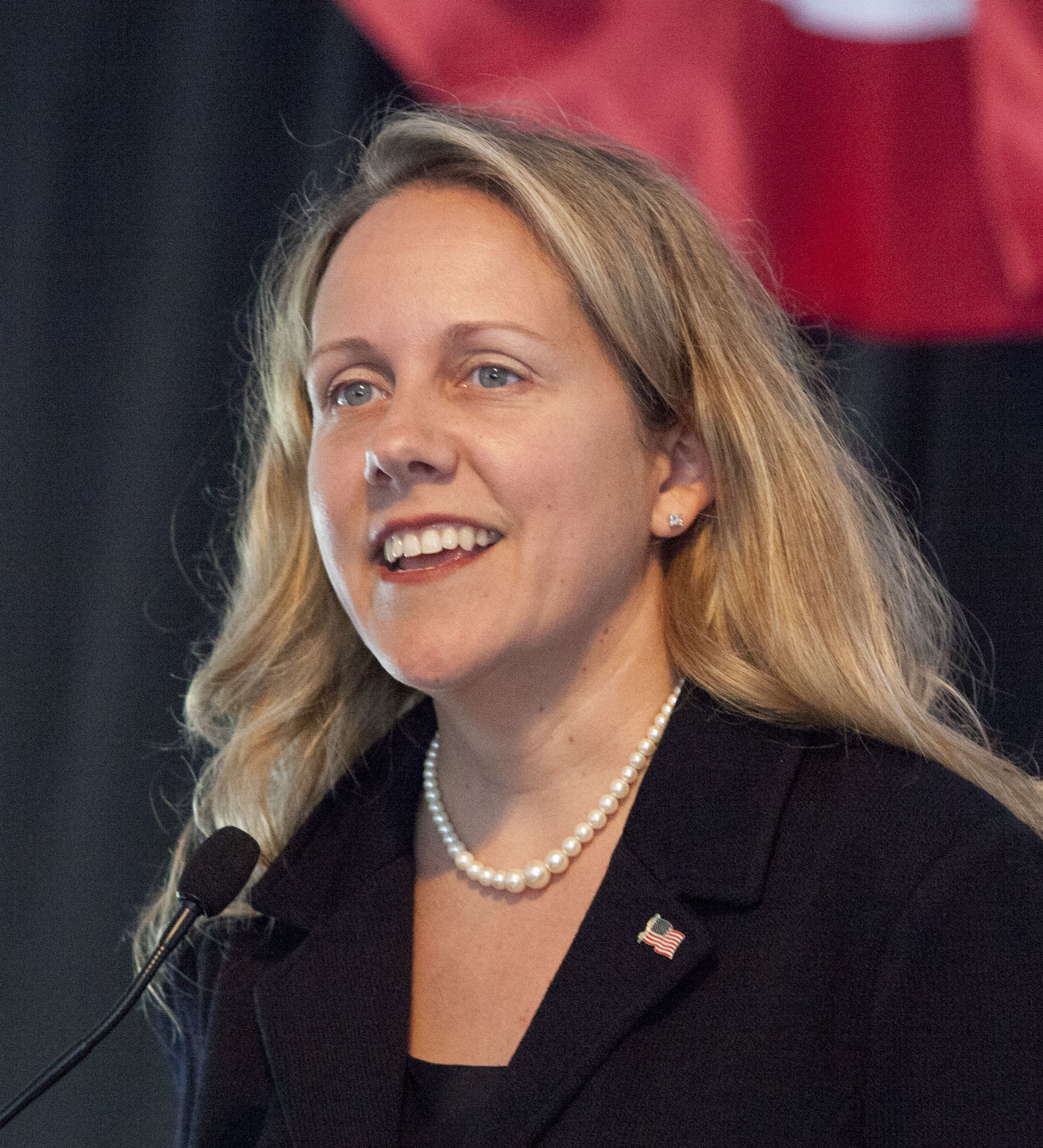

Member of the Illinois House of Representatives from the 47th district
- In office July 15, 2018 – January 11, 2023
- Preceded by: Patti Bellock
- Succeeded by: Amy Grant (redistricted)

Chairman of the College of DuPage Board of Trustees
- In office December 2015 – January 2019
- Preceded by: Kathy Hamilton
- Succeeded by: Frank Napolitano

Personal details
- Party: Republican
- Education: Boston University (B.A.); G.W. Law (J.D.)
- Profession: Attorney

Deanne Marie Mazzochi is a politician who served as a Republican member of the Illinois House of Representatives from the 47th district from 2018 to 2023. The 47th district included all or parts of Elmhurst, Oak Brook, Oakbrook Terrace, Western Springs, Clarendon Hills, Hinsdale, Westmont, and Downers Grove. She was the Chair of the College of DuPage Board of Trustees prior to her appointment to the Illinois House of Representatives.

Mazzochi was sworn in to succeed Patti Bellock on July 15, 2018. She was re-elected in 2020. She lost re-election in 2022 to Democrat Jenn Ladisch Douglass and has not publicly acknowledged or conceded her loss since then.

== Career ==
Mazzochi has Bachelor of Arts degrees in both political science and chemistry from Boston University, and a juris doctor from George Washington University Law School. She is a founding partner in the law firm Rakoczy Molino Mazzochi Siwik. The firm specializes in patent and life sciences law. Her House committee assignments during the 100th General Assembly were: Environment; Health & Healthcare Disparities; Judiciary—Civil; and Mental Health Committees.

In the 2022 legislative session, Mazzochi was a member of the following Illinois House committees:

- Appropriations - Higher Education Committee (HAPI)
- Child Care Access & Early Childhood Education Committee (HCEC)
- Commercial & Property Subcommittee (HJUA-COMM)
- Family Law & Probate Subcommittee (HJUA-FLAW)
- Housing Committee (SHOU)
- Judiciary - Civil Committee (HJUA)
- Judiciary - Criminal Committee (HJUC)
- Labor & Commerce Committee (HLBR)
- Prescription Drug Affordability Committee (HPDA)
- Workforce Development Subcommittee (HLBR-WORK)

== 2022 election results and lawsuit ==
The 2022 general election for the Illinois House of Representatives was held on November 8, 2022. Due to redistricting, Mazzochi ran for re-election in the 45th district. Her Democratic opponent in this election was Jenn Ladisch Douglass.

Mazzochi subsequently lost the election by 364 votes. After it became clear that she was facing electoral defeat, Mazzochi filed a lawsuit against incumbent DuPage County Clerk Jean Kaczmarek, who was also facing reelection in 2022. In the suit, Mazzochi accused the DuPage County Clerk of improperly verifying mail-in ballot signatures. Despite initially being granted a restraining order against Kaczmarek prohibiting the clerk "from using any signature on a Vote by Mail application in connection with validating signatures on the Vote by Mail ballot," the county's election results were certified on November 29, 2022. As of April 2023, Mazzochi has not publicly conceded the election or admitted defeat.

== Electoral history ==
Illinois 47th State House District Republican Primary, 2018
Party	Candidate	Votes	%
Republican	Deanne Marie Mazzochi	8,758	100.0
Total votes		8,758	100.0

Illinois 47th State House District General Election, 2018
Party	Candidate	Votes	%
Republican	Deanne Marie Mazzochi	26,515	51.53
Democratic	James M. "Jim" Caffrey	24,938	48.47
Total votes		51,453	100.0

Illinois 47th State House District Republican Primary, 2020
Party	Candidate	Votes	%
Republican	Deanne Marie Mazzochi	4,335	100.0
Total votes		4,335	100.0

Illinois 47th State House District General Election, 2020
Party	Candidate	Votes	%
Republican	Deanne Marie Mazzochi (incumbent)	34,646	53.99
Democratic	Jennifer Zordani	29,528	46.01
Total votes		64,174	100.0

Illinois 45th State House District General Election, 2022
Party	Candidate	Votes	%
Democratic	Jenn Ladisch Douglas	21,960	50.42
Republican	Deanne Marie Mazzochi (incumbent)(redistricted)	21,596	49.58
Total votes		43,556	100.0
