= Martha Deuter =

American politician

Member of the Illinois House of Representatives from the 45th district
- Incumbent
- Assumed office January 8, 2025
- Preceded by: Jenn Ladisch Douglass

Personal details
- Party: Democratic
- Education: Ohio University; University of Chicago
- Website: www.repmartideuter.com

Martha (Marti) Deuter is an American politician. She serves as a Democratic member of the Illinois House of Representatives for District 45 since 2025.
