= Ben McAdams (Illinois politician) =

American politician

Member of the Illinois Senate from the 24th district
- Member-elect
- Assumed office January 13, 2027
- Preceded by: Seth Lewis

Personal details
- Party: Democratic
- Website: Campaign website

Benjamin (Ben) McAdams is an American politician. A member of the Democratic Party, was elected to the Illinois Senate in 2026, representing the 24th district. He unseated incumbent Republican Seth Lewis in the 2026 election. He is a member of Democratic Socialists of America (DSA).
