= Patricia R. Bellock =

American politician (born 1946)

Patricia Bellock
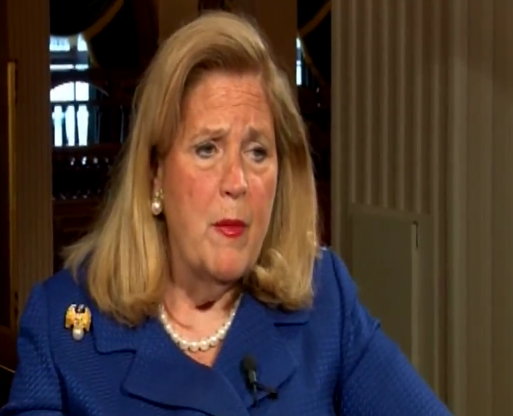

Member of the Illinois House of Representatives from the 47th district
- In office 1998–2018
- Succeeded by: Deanne Mazzochi

Personal details
- Born: October 14, 1946 (age 79) Chicago, Illinois, U.S.
- Party: Republican

Patricia R. Bellock (born October 14, 1946) is a former Republican member of the Illinois House of Representatives, representing the 47th district from 1998 to 2018. The district, since the 2001 remap, encompasses a portion of southeastern DuPage County.

Bellock serves on six committees: Aging, Human Services, International Trade and Commerce, Financial Institutions, Developmental Disabilities and Mental Illness, and Registration and Regulation.

On August 1, 2017, Bellock announced her intention to retire at the end of her term. She later chose to resign early and allow the Republican nominee for the 2018 general election, Deanne Mazzochi, to be appointed by local Republican leaders to the seat.

During the 2008 Republican Party presidential primaries, Bellock ran to be a delegate to the 2008 Republican National Convention from Illinois's 13th congressional district for the presidential campaign of former Governor Mitt Romney.

Illinois House of Representatives
Preceded by Judy Biggert	Member of the Illinois House of Representatives from the 81st district 1999–2003	Succeeded by Renée Kosel
Preceded by Eileen Lyons	Member of the Illinois House of Representatives from the 47th district 2003–2018	Succeeded by Deanne Mazzochi
