= Margaret DeLaRosa =

American politician (born 1961–1962)

- DeLaRosa speaking in 2026

Member of the Illinois House of Representatives from the 47th district
- Incumbent
- Assumed office October 12, 2025
- Preceded by: Terra Costa Howard

Personal details
- Born: 1961 or 1962 (age 64–65) Glen Ellyn, Illinois
- Party: Democratic
- Education: DePaul University (B.Acy)

Margaret DeLaRosa (born 1961-1962) is an American politician and school board member who is currently serving as a Democratic member of the Illinois House of Representatives, representing the 42nd district. She was appointed to the seat following the resignation of incumbent representative Terra Costa Howard in early October 2025.

== Personal life and career ==
DeLaRosa was born and raised in Glen Ellyn. DeLaRosa graduated from DePaul University with a bachelor's degree in accounting. DeLaRosa was elected to the Glenbard Township District 87 school board in 2015. She formerly served as the school board president before resigning following her appointment to the Illinois House of Representatives.
