= Terra Costa Howard =

American politician

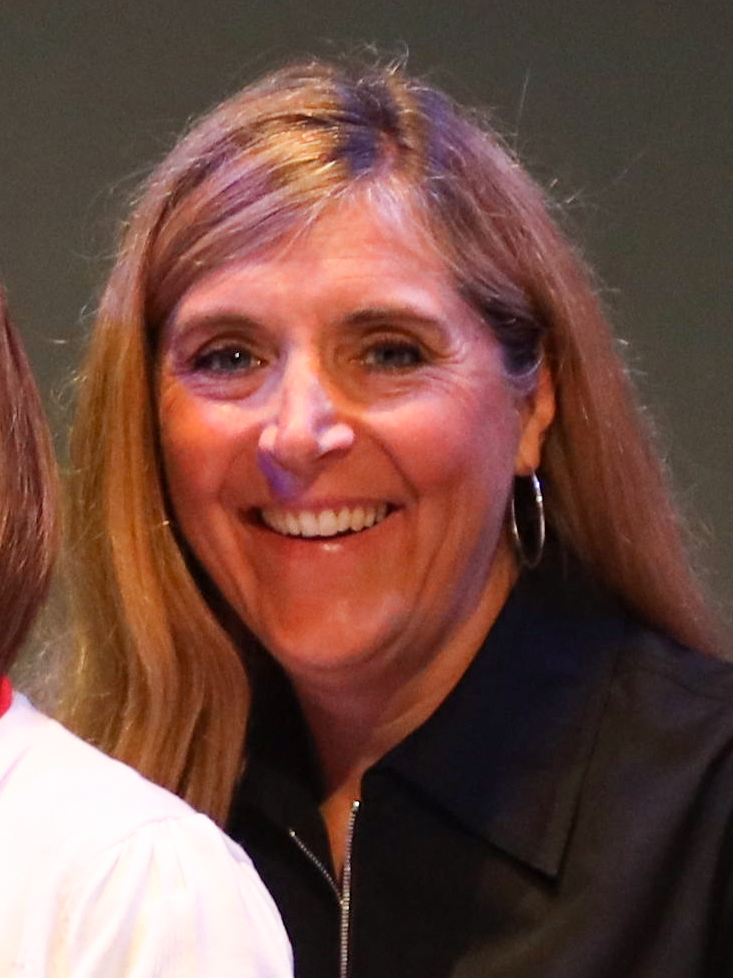
- Costa Howard in 2025

Member of the Illinois House of Representatives from the 42nd district
- In office January 11, 2023 – October 2, 2025
- Preceded by: Amy Grant (redistricted)
- Succeeded by: Margaret DeLaRosa

Member of the Illinois House of Representatives from the 48th district
- In office January 9, 2019 – January 11, 2023
- Preceded by: Peter Breen
- Succeeded by: Jennifer Sanalitro (redistricted)

Personal details
- Party: Democratic
- Children: 3
- Education: University of Illinois (B.A.); DePaul University (J.D.)
- Occupation: Illinois State Representative
- Profession: Attorney

Terra Costa Howard is a former Democrat Illinois State Representative for the 42nd district. She was first elected to the Illinois General Assembly in 2018. She represented the 42nd district from 2023 to 2025, when she resigned to assume a judgeship. The 42nd district includes all or parts of Glen Ellyn, Lisle, Lombard, Wheaton, Flowerfield and Villa Park.

== Electoral career ==
Prior to her election to the Illinois House of Representatives, Costa Howard was a member of the Glen Ellyn School District 41 Board of Education and the Glen Ellyn Plan Commission.

Costa Howard defeated incumbent and House Republican Floor Leader Peter Breen in the 2018 general election. She defeated Breen again in the 2020 general election.

== Illinois House of Representatives ==
Costa Howard was first sworn into the Illinois House of Representatives on January 9, 2019. She was reelected in 2020, 2022, and 2024. After her resignation, Margaret DeLaRosa was appointed as her successor.

=== Committees ===
As of 2022, Costa Howard serves on the following committees and subcommittees:

- Adoption and Child Welfare (Vice-Chairperson)
- Appropriations - Higher Education Committee
- Appropriations-Elementary & Secondary Education Committee
- Appropriations-Human Services Committee
- Judiciary - Civil Committee
- Mental Health & Addiction Committee
- Tourism Committee
- Transportation: Vehicles & Safety Committee
- Special Issues (AP) Subcommittee
- Family Law & Probate Subcommittee (Sub-Chairperson)

=== Legislation ===
Several pieces of legislation introduced by Costa Howard in the Illinois House of Representatives have gone on to become law in Illinois. HB12, of which she was the Primary Sponsor, allowed employees of a school district, public university, or community college district who had been employed for at least 12 months and who has worked at least 1,000 hours in the previous 12-month period to be eligible for family and medical leave under the same terms and conditions provided to eligible employees under the federal Family and Medical Leave Act of 1993. This legislation was passed in the midst of the COVID-19 pandemic.

== Judicial Service ==
On September 23, 2025, the Illinois Supreme Court announced it would appoint Costa Howard as a resident circuit judge for a term starting October 17, 2025, and ending December 7, 2026.

== Personal life ==
Costa Howard was born and raised in DuPage County, where she now resides with her spouse and their three daughters.

Costa Howard is an attorney by trade. She attended University of Illinois at Urbana–Champaign and DePaul University College of Law. She is also a Girl Scout leader, an adjunct professor at the College of DuPage, and a member of the Parent Teacher Association.

== Electoral history ==
Illinois 48th State House District Primary Election, 2018
Party	Candidate	Votes	%
Democratic	Terra Costa Howard	10,859	100
Total votes		10,859	100.0

Illinois 48th State House District General Election, 2018
Party	Candidate	Votes	%
Democratic	Terra Costa Howard	26,820	53.50
Republican	Peter Breen (incumbent)	23,313	46.50
Total votes		50,133	100.0

Illinois 48th State House District General Election, 2020
Party	Candidate	Votes	%
Democratic	Terra Costa Howard	33,303	53.77
Republican	Peter Breen	28,628	46.23
Total votes		61,931	100.0
