= Jennifer Sanalitro =

American politician

Member of the Illinois House of Representatives from the 48th district
- Incumbent
- Assumed office January 11, 2023
- Preceded by: Terra Costa Howard
- Succeeded by: Amanda Zahorak (elect)

Personal details
- Born: Tacoma, Washington
- Party: Republican

Jennifer Sanalitro is an American politician serving as a member of the Illinois House of Representatives for the 48th district.
