= Amy Grant (politician) =

American politician (born 1948)

Member of the Illinois House of Representatives from the 47th district
- Incumbent
- Assumed office January 11, 2023
- Preceded by: Deanne Mazzochi (redistricted)

Member of the Illinois House of Representatives from the 42nd district
- In office January 9, 2019 – January 11, 2023
- Preceded by: Jeanne Ives
- Succeeded by: Terra Costa Howard (redistricted)

Personal details
- Born: May 12, 1948 (age 78) Chicago, Illinois, U.S.
- Party: Republican
- Spouse: Jim Grant
- Children: 2
- Education: University of Pittsburgh (BS)
- Profession: Politician
- Website: Official website

Amy Grant is an American politician, currently serving as the Republican member of the Illinois House of Representatives for the 47th district. The district, located in DuPage County, includes all or parts of Carol Stream, Lisle, Warrenville, Wheaton, Winfield, West Chicago, and Naperville.

Grant, of Wheaton, was a member of the DuPage County Board at the time of her election to the Illinois House of Representatives. Prior to moving to Illinois, Grant was a teacher in Pittsburgh, Pennsylvania.

As of July 3, 2022, Representative Grant was a member of the following Illinois House committees:

- Adoption & Child Welfare Committee (HACW)
- Citizen Impact Subcommittee (HMAC-CITI)
- Human Services Committee (HHSV)
- Judiciary - Criminal Committee (HJUC)
- Mental Health & Addiction Committee (HMEH)
- Museums, Arts, & Cultural Enhancement Committee (HMAC)
- Special Issues (HS) Subcommittee (HHSV-SPIS)

== Controversy ==
Amy Grant was recorded making remarks some fellow legislators called racist and homophobic, according to the Chicago Sun-Times and other newspapers. She was quoted referring to her opponent Ken Mejia-Beal, who is Black and openly gay, saying "That's all we need is another person on the Black Caucus" in one clip and "Not because he’s Black, but because of the way he talks — he’s all LGBTQ" in another.

== Electoral history ==
Illinois 42nd State House District Republican Primary, 2018
Party	Candidate	Votes	%
Republican	Amy L. Grant	7,593	66.26
Republican	Burt Minor	2,567	22.41
Republican	Ryan Edward Byrne	1,299	11.34
Total votes		11,459	100.0

Illinois 42nd State House District General Election, 2018
Party	Candidate	Votes	%
Republican	Amy L. Grant	26,381	52.24
Democratic	Kathleen V. Carrier	24,122	47.76
Total votes		50,503	100.0
