= Keith P. Sommer =

American politician

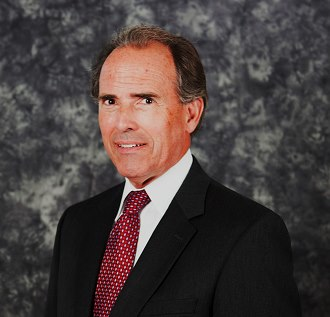

Member of the Illinois House of Representatives from the 88th district
- In office January 1999 – December 2022
- Preceded by: Jay Ackerman
- Succeeded by: Dan Caulkins

Personal details
- Born: September 6, 1946 (age 80) Peoria, Illinois, U.S.
- Party: Republican
- Spouse: Deborah Sommer
- Education: University of Virginia (B.A.)
- Occupation: Real estate broker

Keith P. Sommer (born September 6, 1946) was a Republican member of the Illinois House of Representatives from 1999 to 2022. Sommer represented the 88th district which included the cities of Morton, Washington, and Bloomington.

== Early life and career ==
Sommer was born September 6, 1946, in Morton, Illinois. He earned a B.A. in government from the University of Virginia. Sommer previously served as a Tazewell County Board member from 1994 to 1998, Tazewell County Recorder of Deeds from 1984 to 1988, and a Morton Village Board member from 1977 to 1986. His brother Roger Sommer served in the Illinois Senate.

== Legislative career ==
On July 31, 2017, Sommer was appointed a member of the Trade Policy Task Force for a term ending December 31, 2018. The Trade Policy Task Force's function is to analyze important issues relative to the growth of international trade and make recommendations to Congress, the United States Trade Representative, and the White House National Trade Council regarding trade policy. The Task Force also promotes Illinois as a market for exporting and importing. Sommer did not seek reelection in the 2022 general election and resigned from the Illinois House of Representatives after the election. Representative-elect Bill Hauter was named to finish Sommer’s term in the 88th district.

As of July 3, 2022, Representative Sommers was a member of the following Illinois House committees:

- Adoption & Child Welfare Committee (HACW)
- Economic Opportunity & Equity Committee (HECO)
- Insurance Committee (HINS)
- International Trade & Commerce Committee (HITC)

=== Voting record ===
- 2003 - Voted for allowing the children of immigrants to pay the same college tuition rates as their high school graduation class peers.
- 2005 - Voted against a law that would limit the practice of pension spiking.
- 2007 - Voted to prohibit the State Board of Education or local school boards from giving taxpayer support toward virtual/online education.
- 2009 - Voted to impeach Governor Rod Blagojevich.
- 2009 - Voted against requiring political candidates to claim legal expenses under campaign finance.
- 2011 - Voted against the expansion of gambling.
- 2012 - Voted to allow citizens to record the actions of the police in public areas.
- 2012 - Voted to make plastic bag manufacturers responsible for recycling of the bags they produce.
- 2012 - Voted against easing access to early release for good conduct for prisoners.
- 2013 - Voted against state marriage laws applying equally to marriages of same-sex and different-sex couples and their children.
- 2014 - Voted against Illinois' ratification of the Equal Rights Amendment.
- 2015 - Introduced and voted for legislation to make Pumpkin Pie the official state pie of Illinois.
- 2017 - Voted against legislation requiring a school district to make feminine hygiene products available.
- 2018 - Voted against Illinois' ratification of the Equal Rights Amendment.
- 2019 - Voted against legalizing recreational marijuana in Illinois.

== Electoral history ==
=== 2012 Illinois House campaign ===
On March 20, 2012, Sommer won the Republican primary against opponent Steve Perry with 72% of the votes. Sommer was uncontested in the general election, and was re-elected on November 6, 2012.

=== 2018 Illinois House campaign ===
In the 2018 Illinois legislative election, Sommer faced an opponent in a general election for the first time since 2008. Sommer won the election against Democrat Jill Blair with 58.7% of votes. He ran unopposed in the Republican primary election.

=== 2020 Illinois House campaign ===
Sommer won re-election in the 2020 Illinois legislative election against Libertarian Ken Allison and Democrat Karla Bailey-Smith, earning 60.1% of votes. Allison and Bailey-Smith earned 4.4% and 35.4% of votes, respectively. He ran unopposed in the Republican primary election.
