= Lindsey LaPointe =

Politician in Illinois

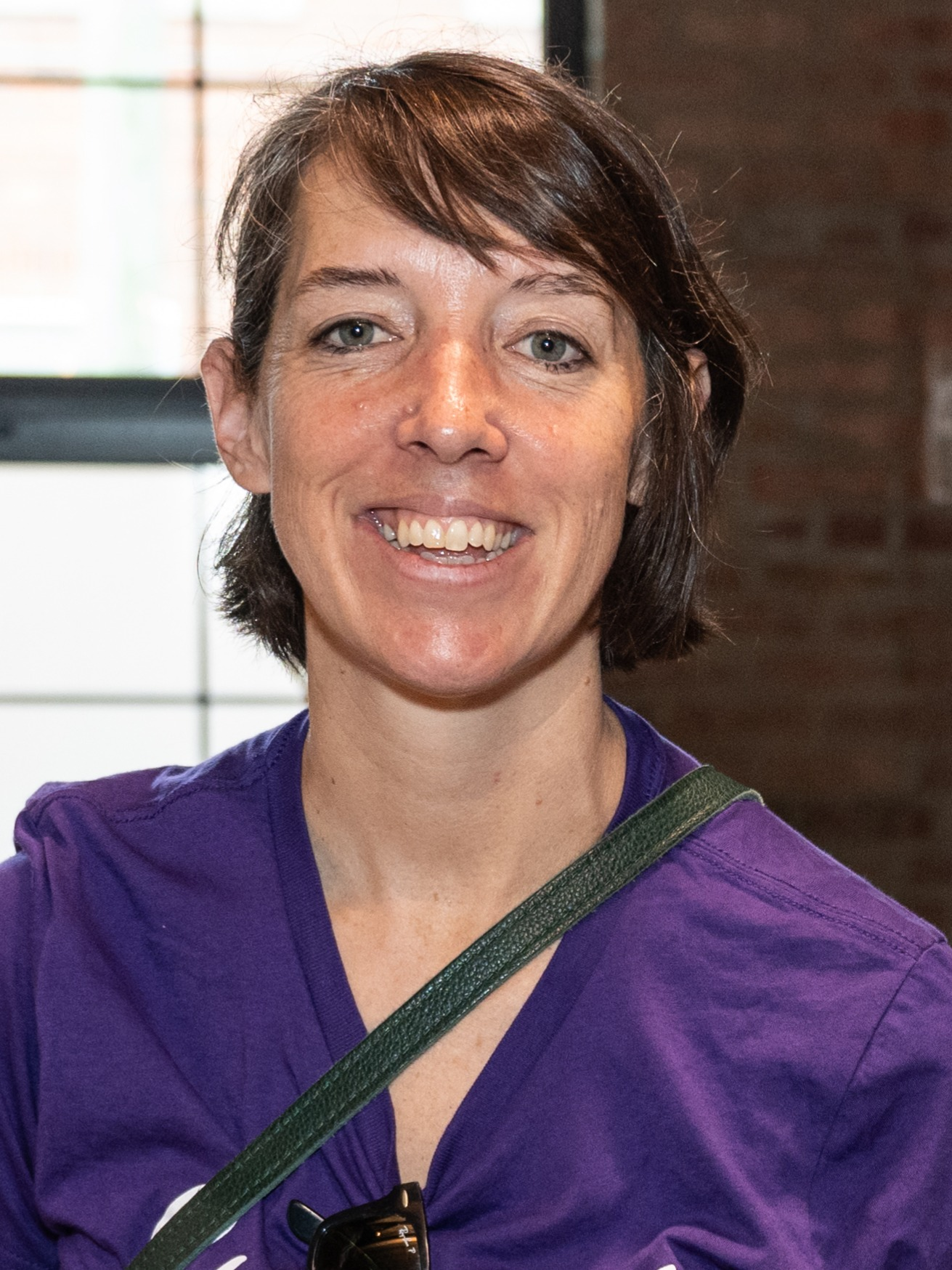

Member of the Illinois House of Representatives from the 19th district
- Incumbent
- Assumed office July 24, 2019
- Preceded by: Robert Martwick

Personal details
- Born: 1981 or 1982 (age 44–45) Portland, Maine, U.S.
- Party: Democratic
- Education: Grinnell College (BA); University of Illinois, Chicago (MSW)

Lindsey LaPointe (born 1981/1982) is a Democratic member of the Illinois House of Representatives for the 19th district. The district, located in the Chicago area, includes parts of Elmwood Park, Harwood Heights, Norridge, and River Grove and includes parts of the Chicago neighborhoods of Dunning, Forest Glen, Jefferson Park, Norwood Park, O'Hare, and Portage Park.

== Early life, education, and career ==
LaPointe earned a Bachelor of Arts in sociology from Grinnell College and a Master's in Social Work from the University of Illinois Chicago. She was the program manager of Adult Redeploy Illinois at the Illinois Criminal Justice Information Authority, an agency that works with county officials on court-based alternatives to incarceration. She has cited her frustration with the impact of the Illinois Budget Impasse on the agency as one of her motivations to enter politics. She also worked as project manager of justice reform at Business and Professional People for the Public Interest (BPI).

Her early engagement in electoral politics included organizing for congressman Jesús "Chuy" García. She served as vice president of the 45th Ward Independent Democrats organization, and was a delegate to the Illinois Women's Institute for Leadership in 2018.

From 2014 to 2018, she served vice president of the board of Hands to Help Ministries, a non-profit organization focused on addressing homelessness. She currently serves on the Dean's Advisory Council on Diversity, Equity and Social Inclusion at the Jane Addams College of Social Work.

== Illinois State Representative (2019–present) ==
=== Appointment and 2020 election ===
On July 24, 2019, LaPointe was appointed to serve as representative for the 19th district in the Illinois House for the remainder of outgoing representative Robert Martwick's term. Martwick had in turn been appointed as state senator for the 10th district to replace John Mulroe. Vacancies in the Illinois state legislature are filled by the party of the outgoing officeholder, and the Cook County Democratic Party delegates this decision to ward and township committeepeople who receive weighted votes based on previous election results. John Arena, committeeman for the 45th ward and former alderman for the ward, held 47 percent of the weighted vote, while Martwick held 33 percent of the vote as committeeman for the 38th ward. Both Arena and Martwick supported LaPointe in the appointment vote. Timothy Heneghan, the 41st ward committeeman who had unsuccessfully sought appointment to the senate vacancy that Martwick filled, accused the process of being a "back room deal."

LaPointe ran for a full two-year term in the 2020 Illinois elections. In the Democratic primary election for the seat, she faced Chicago police officer Joe Duplechin and former WGN radio personality Patti Vasquez. She has been endorsed by the Chicago Tribune, the Chicago Sun-Times, Chicago mayor Lori Lightfoot, U.S. Senator Dick Durbin, U.S. Representative Mike Quigley, former state senator Daniel Biss, and a number of labor unions. In March 2020, LaPointe circulated campaign mailings alleging that her two opponents were anti-women's rights by pointing to past electoral support of particular donors. Duplechin and Vasquez criticized the mailer, and NBC Chicago found that LaPointe had received similar donations from some of the very same donors. LaPointe won the primary election on March 17, 2020, with 41.3% of the vote, and faced Jeff Muehlfelder in the general election on November 3, 2020.

=== Tenure ===
In February 2020, LaPointe introduced legislation that would allow first responders to claim worker's compensation benefits to cover post-traumatic stress disorder. That same month, she sponsored legislation that would require the Department of Veterans' Affairs to create a veterans assistance hotline. She has also co-sponsored legislation including the Clean Energy Jobs Act, a bill that would allow eligible students to vote during school hours on election day, and a bill that would create a state-wide Domestic Violence Task Force.

==== Committees ====
As of July 3, 2022, Representative LaPointe is a member of the following Illinois House Committees:

- Appropriations - Public Safety (HAPP)
- Elementary & Secondary Education: School Curriculum & Policies Committee (HELM)
- Housing Committee (SHOU)
- Human Services Committee (HHSV)
- Police & Fire Committee (SHPF)
- (chairwoman of) Public Benefits Subcommittee (HHSV-PUBX)

== Electoral history ==
Illinois 19th Representative District Democratic Primary, 2020
Party	Candidate	Votes	%
Democratic	Lindsey LaPointe (incumbent)	7,295	42.56
Democratic	Patricia D. "Patti Vasquez" Bonnin	5,979	34.89
Democratic	Joe Duplechin	3,865	22.55
Total votes		17,139	100.0

Illinois 19th Representative District General Election, 2020
Party	Candidate	Votes	%
Democratic	Lindsey LaPointe (incumbent)	27,823	58.40
Republican	Jeff Muehlfelder	18,277	38.36
Libertarian	Joseph Schreiner	1,544	3.24
Total votes		47,644	100.0

Illinois 19th Representative District Democratic Primary, 2022
Party	Candidate	Votes	%
Democratic	Lindsey LaPointe (incumbent)	9,474	76.13
Democratic	Tina Wallace	2,970	23.87
Total votes		12,444	100.0

Illinois 19th Representative District General Election, 2022
Party	Candidate	Votes	%	±%
Democratic	Lindsey LaPointe (incumbent)	22,458	69.85	+11.45%
Republican	Michael Harn	9695	30.15	−8.21%
Total votes		32,153	100.0	

== Personal life ==
LaPointe lives in Portage Park, Chicago.
