= Seth Lewis =

American politician

Member of the Illinois Senate from the 24th district
- Incumbent
- Assumed office January 11, 2023
- Preceded by: Suzy Glowiak (redistricted)
- Succeeded by: Ben McAdams (elect)

Member of the Illinois House of Representatives from the 45th district
- In office January 13, 2021 – January 11, 2023
- Preceded by: Diane Pappas
- Succeeded by: Jenn Ladisch Douglass

Personal details
- Party: Republican
- Spouse: Bhavna Sharma-Lewis
- Children: 2
- Education: University of Iowa (B.S.)
- Profession: Industrial Engineer; Politician
- Website: https://senatorlewis.com

Seth Lewis is an American politician who is the Republican member of the Illinois Senate from the 24th district. He previously served as a member of the Illinois House of Representatives from the 45th district from 2021 to 2023.

== Electoral career ==
Lewis began his career in public service as a Bartlett Fire Protection District Trustee. Lewis later ran for Illinois State Senate in the 23rd district in 2016 and 2018, but lost both elections to incumbent Tom Cullerton.

In 2020, Lewis announced that he would be running against incumbent Diane Pappas in Illinois' 45th House District. Lewis defeated Pappas in the general election with 53% of the vote.

== Illinois House of Representatives ==
=== Committees ===
Currently, Lewis serves on seven committees and one subcommittee: the Transportation: Regulation, Roads committee, the Labor & Commerce committee, the Judiciary - Civil committee, the International Trade & Commerce committee, the Consumer Protection committee, the Appropriations-Human Services committee, the Civil Procedure & Tort Liability committee, and the Wage Policy & Study subcommittee.

=== Legislation ===
As of 2022, one bill with Lewis listed as the Primary Sponsor has gone on to become law in Illinois: HB2109. This legislation amended the Illinois Insurance Code to require individual and group accident and health insurers to cover "medically necessary comprehensive cancer testing and testing of blood or constitutional tissue for cancer predisposition testing as determined by a physician."

== Personal life ==
Lewis has been married to Dr. Bhavna Sharma-Lewis since 1997, with whom he has two children. Sharma-Lewis currently serves as superintendent of Diamond Lake School District 76. He has lived in Bartlett, Illinois since 2001.

== Electoral history ==
Illinois 23rd State Senate District Republican Primary, 2016
Party	Candidate	Votes	%
Republican	Seth Lewis	21,362	100.0
Total votes		21,362	100.0

Illinois 23rd State Senate District General Election, 2016
Party	Candidate	Votes	%
Democratic	Thomas E. Cullerton (incumbent)	44,643	50.69
Republican	Seth Lewis	43,429	49.31
Total votes		88,072	100.0

Illinois 23rd State Senate District Republican Primary, 2018
Party	Candidate	Votes	%
Republican	Seth Lewis	12,193	100.0
Total votes		12,193	100.0

Illinois 23rd State Senate District General Election, 2018
Party	Candidate	Votes	%
Democratic	Thomas Cullerton (incumbent)	39,604	54.86
Republican	Seth Lewis	32,582	45.14
Total votes		72,186	100.0

Illinois 45th State House District General Election, 2020
Party	Candidate	Votes	%
Republican	Seth Lewis	30,246	53.22
Democratic	Diane Pappas (incumbent)	26,590	46.78
Total votes		56,836	100.0

2022 Illinois State Senate District 24 General Election
Party	Candidate	Votes	%
Republican	Seth Lewis	43,389	52.0
Democratic	Lauren Nowak (incumbent)	39,978	48.0
Total votes		83,367	100.0
