= Adam Niemerg =

American politician (born 1984)

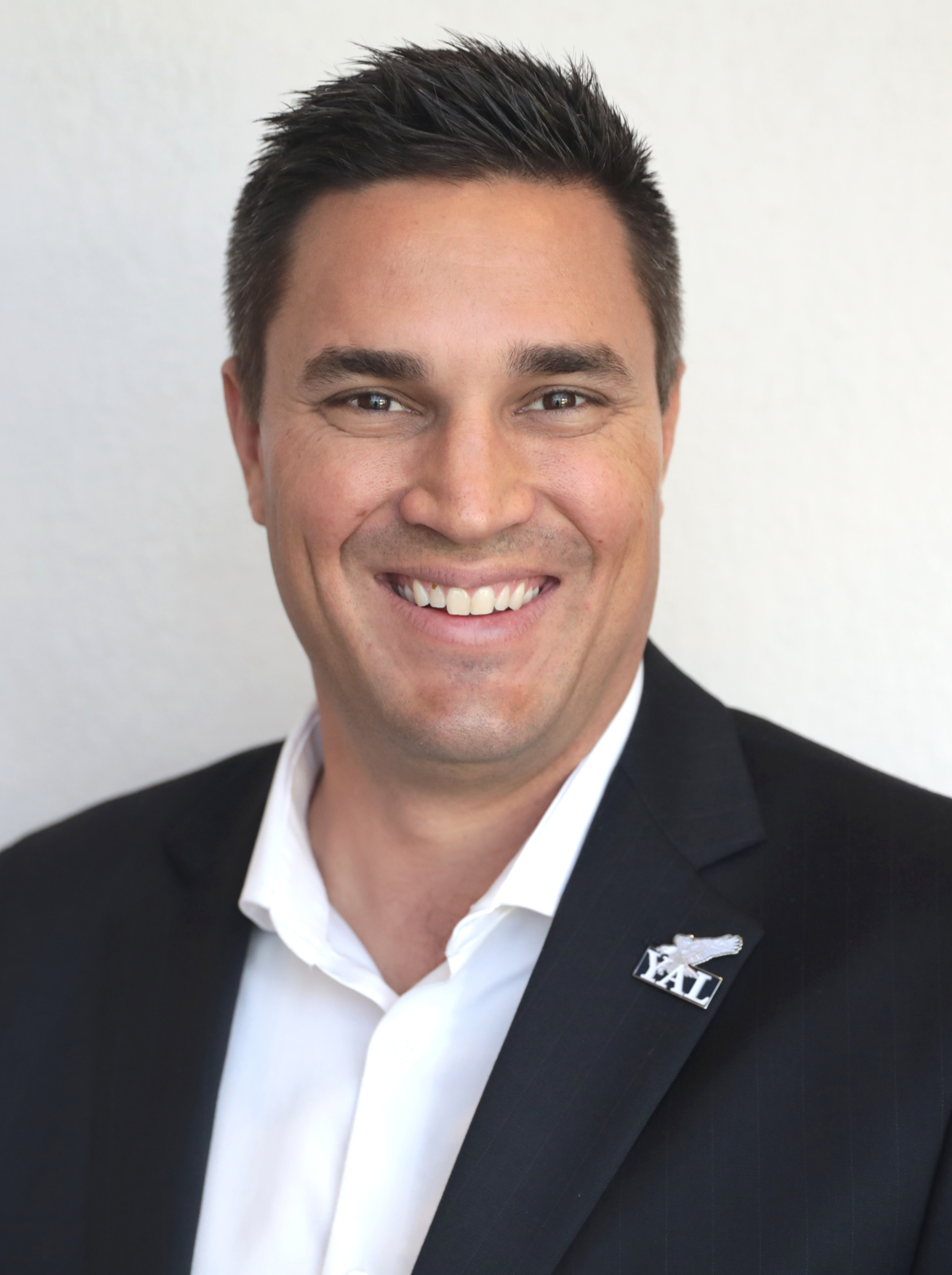
- Niemerg at the 2022 Hazlitt Summit hosted by Young Americans for Liberty Foundation

Member of the Illinois House of Representatives from the 109th district
- Incumbent
- Assumed office January 13, 2021
- Preceded by: Darren Bailey

Personal details
- Born: March 17, 1984 (age 42) Teutopolis, Illinois, U.S.
- Party: Republican
- Spouse: Trina
- Children: 2
- Parent(s): Phil and Stephanie
- Education: Eastern Illinois University (BA)

Adam M. Niemerg is a Republican member of the Illinois House of Representatives from the 102nd that includes all or portions of Champaign County, Clark County, Coles County, Crawford County, Cumberland County, Douglas County, Edgar County, Effingham County, Jasper County, Lawrence County, and Vermilion County. First elected in 2020 in the former 109th District, he was sworn in on January 13, 2021. Niemerg was elected to the 109th district to succeed Republican then-state Representative Darren Bailey after Bailey successfully ran for the Illinois Senate.

== Early life, education, and career ==
Niemerg was born in Teutopolis, Illinois to his parents Phil and Stephanie. He was the oldest of five children. Niemerg graduated from Teutopolis High School in 2002. He attended Lake Land College and Eastern Illinois University and earned his Bachelor of Arts in history. After graduating, he worked as a senior claims adjuster for Country Financial for 12 years. He is a member of the American Farm Bureau Federation. In the aftermath of the storming of the US Capitol by a mob of Trump supporters, Niemerg condemned the violence. However, Niemerg claimed there was "credible questions" surrounding the results of the 2020 presidential election.

As of January 13, 2023, Representative Niemerg is a member of the following Illinois House Committees in the 103rd General Assembly:

- Appropriations - General Service Committee (HAPG)
- Business & Industry Innovation Sub-Committee (HLBR-HLBI)
- Consumer Protection Committee (HCON)
- Elementary & Secondary Education: School Curriculum & Policies Committee (HELM)
- Insurance Committee (HINS)
- Labor & Commerce Committee (HLBR)
- Restorative Justice Committee (SHRJ)
- Wage Policy Study Sub-Committee (HLBR-HLWP)
- Legislative Audit Commission

Previously, in the 102nd General Assembly (2021-2022), Representative Niemerg was a member of the following Illinois House Committees:

- Cybersecurity, Data Analytics, & IT Committee (HCDA)
- Health Care Availability & Access Committee (HHCA)
- Housing Committee (SHOU)
- Insurance Committee (HINS)
- Labor & Commerce Committee (HLBR)
- Minority Impact Analysis Subcommittee (HLBR-MIAS)

== Electoral history ==
=== 2020 election ===
Illinois 109th State House District Republican Primary, 2020
Party	Candidate	Votes	%
Republican	Adam M Niemerg	11,597	57.86
Republican	Andrew R. (Andy) Hires	8,446	42.14
Total votes		20,043	100.0

Illinois 109th State House District General Election, 2020
Party	Candidate	Votes	%
Republican	Adam M Niemerg	43,100	82.15
Democratic	John Spencer	9,366	17.85
Total votes		52,466	100.0

=== 2024 election ===
After filing to run for the Republican nomination, Niemerg's petitions were challenged for a failure to notarize his statement of candidacy. Subsequently, the Illinois State Board of Elections ruled in favor of the objection to his petition filing based on this error, leaving him off of the ballot.

== Personal life ==
Niemerg currently resides in rural Dieterich in Effingham County with his wife Trina and two children. He and his family are "members of the St. Isidore the Farmer Catholic Parish and they attend St. Aloysius Church."
