= Bill Hauter =

American politician

Member of the Illinois House of Representatives from the 88th district
- Incumbent
- Assumed office January 1, 2023
- Preceded by: Keith Sommer

Personal details
- Party: Republican
- Education: University of Illinois (M.D.)
- Profession: Physician

William E. Hauter is an American doctor and Republican member of the Illinois House of Representatives from the 87th district. The 87th district, located in Central Illinois, includes parts of DeWitt, Logan, Macon, McLean, and Sangamon counties.

== Early life and career ==
William E. Hauter, a graduate of the University of Illinois College of Medicine, is a board-certified doctor in Emergency Medicine and Anesthesiology. In his medical career, he has been at various times a partner at Associated Anesthesiologists; an emergency physician at OSF Saint Francis Medical Center, and an assistant clinical professor at the Peoria campus of the University of Illinois College of Medicine. He was elected to the County Board in Tazewell County, Illinois, in the 2020 general election.

== Illinois House of Representatives ==
On December 21, 2022, the Republican Representative Committee of the Republican Party of the 88th Representative District appointed Hauter to the remainder of Representative Sommer's term. Hauter served from the 88th district for the remainder of the 102nd General Assembly. The 88th district included parts of Tazewell and McLean counties. Upon being sworn in to the 103rd General Assembly, to which he was elected, he became the representative for the 87th district. Hauter was sworn into office on January 1, 2023.

== Political Positions ==
=== Abortion and Reproductive Rights ===
Hauter has opposed legislation that expands abortion access. He voted against HB 3637, which ensures access to abortion medication even if the FDA revokes approval, calling it “unprecedented” and warning lawmakers not to “reject the authority of the U.S. Federal Food and Drug Administration.” The legislation favored recommendations from the World Health Organization, which he described as “a foreign, unelected, unaccountable organization that’s mostly controlled by China.” Hauter claimed in a Facebook post that, "every one of these laws expanding 'reproductive rights' makes abortions LESS safe in Illinois."

Hauter also opposed Senate Bill 1909, which allows consumer fraud lawsuits against crisis pregnancy centers (CPCs) accused of providing deceptive information. His wife is director of the Living Alternatives Pregnancy Resource Center in Pekin, and Hauter has described the couple as “heavily involved” in such centers.

=== COVID-19 and Vaccines ===
Hauter has been critical of Illinois’ handling of the COVID-19 pandemic, saying that the state's “risk analysis was off” and that lockdowns and school closures were excessive. He argued that stricter lockdowns in Democratic-led states “had no better outcomes” than looser restrictions elsewhere.

He has questioned the need for vaccination in people with prior infection, claiming that “they don’t need the shot” and that natural infection may produce “better antibodies than the people who got the vaccination.”

Hauter has criticized the credibility of public health authorities, including former Illinois Department of Public Health Director Ngozi Ezike, whom he described as a “yes person” to Governor J.B. Pritzker. Hauter has also criticized IDPR directly, saying, “They don't have a lot of credibility, even with me and other medical professionals after they screwed up COVID so badly."

In 2025, Hauter criticized House Bill 767, legislation signed by Governor Pritzker that expands vaccine access in Illinois and requires state-regulated health insurance providers to cover vaccines recommended by the Illinois Department of Public Health. The bill was prompted in part by concerns raised by the bill's sponsor, Rep. Bob Morgan, who said, “When Secretary Kennedy fired all 17 members of the CDC's vaccine advisory committee this summer, it was a direct attack on public health and the legitimacy of sound medical advice.” Hauter labeled the bill, which guarantees that vaccines are accessible and covered to those that want them, as “a Trump Derangement Syndrome bill”.

=== Substance Abuse ===
Hauter expressed reservations about legislation providing the overdose-reversal drug naloxone to people leaving incarceration if they were imprisoned for drug-related offenses or had a documented substance abuse problem. While the bill's sponsor, Representative Justin Slaughter, cited data showing that overdose is the leading cause of death for individuals recently released from incarceration, Hauter questioned the approach, saying, “Let’s get it into the right hands and I’m not sure that the released inmate is the person you dispense this medication to. It’s really important that we dispense to someone that can rescue them.”

=== Native American Mascots ===
Hauter has defended the use of Native American mascots and logos, arguing that they honor local history and recognize the role of Native Americans in the nation's founding, rejecting claims that such symbols are insulting or misrepresentative. He opposed HB1237, a bill that would require school boards to prohibit schools from using Native American names, logos, or mascots.

=== Donald Trump ===
In response to the 2024 conviction of President Donald Trump on 34 felony counts related to falsifying business records, Hauter characterized the prosecution as politically motivated. “I think, clearly, it was targeted ‘lawfare,’” he said. “I don’t think the justice system was blind. I don’t think any Democrat would have been brought up for charges.” Hauter warned that the verdict could set a precedent for politically motivated prosecutions in the future.

== Electoral history ==
=== 2022 ===
In the 2022 Republican primary, Hauter defeated Mary J. Burress, the Tazewell County Treasurer, and was unopposed in the 2022 general election.

2022 Republican Primary Election - Illinois House of Representatives' 87th district
Party	Candidate	Votes	%
Republican	William E. Hauter	8,828	56.82
Republican	Mary J. Burress	6,709	43.18
Total votes		15,537	100.0

2022 General Election - Illinois House of Representatives' 87th district
Party	Candidate	Votes	%
Republican	Bill Hauter	37,568	100.00
Total votes		37,568	100.00
Turnout			
Republican hold			
