= Will Davis (Illinois politician) =

American politician

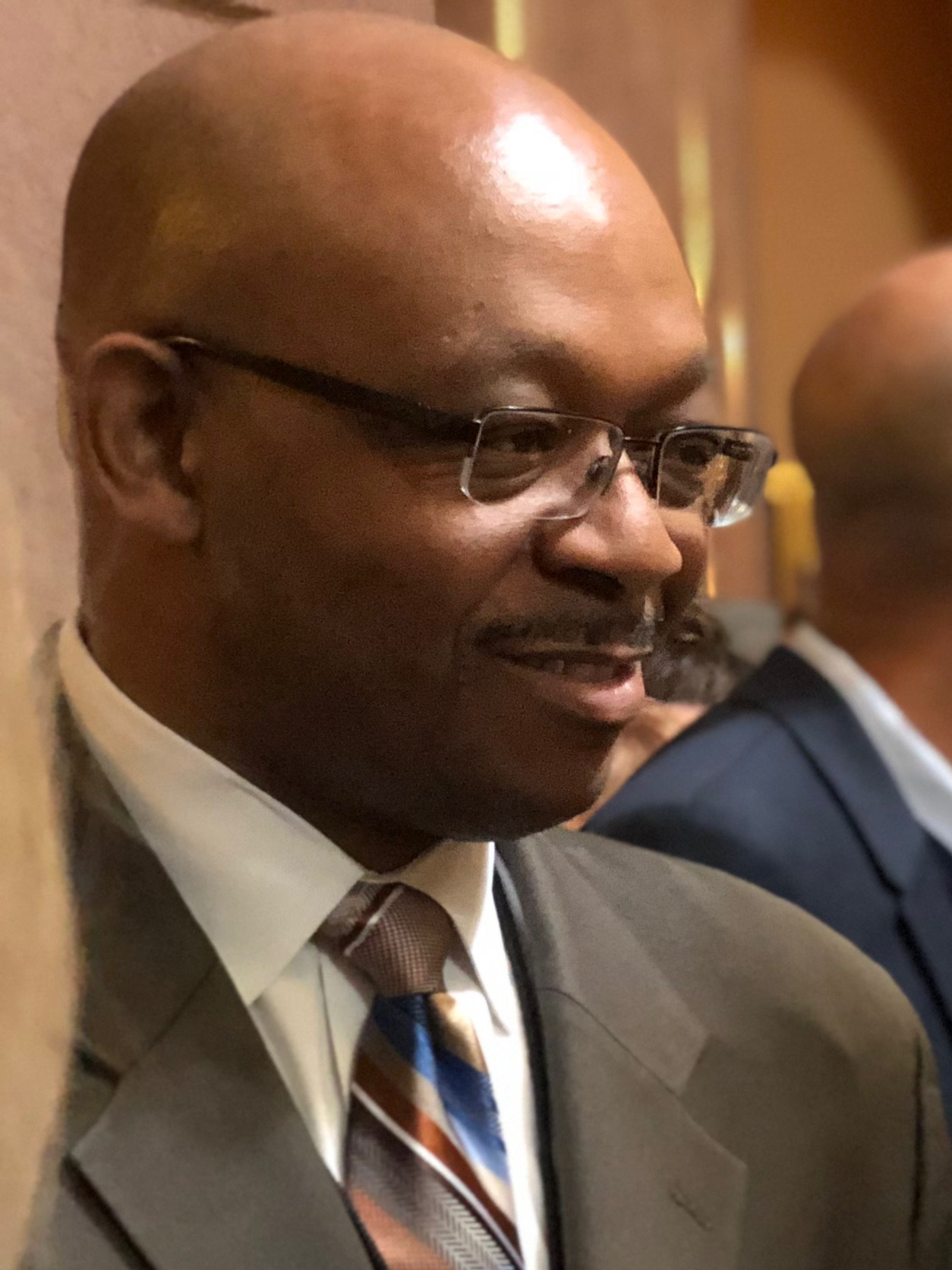

Member of the Illinois House of Representatives from the 30th district
- Incumbent
- Assumed office January 8, 2003
- Preceded by: Harold Murphy

Personal details
- Born: William Quincy Davis; July 2, 1968 (age 58) Harvey, Illinois, U.S.
- Party: Democratic
- Education: Southern Illinois University, Carbondale (BA); Governors State University (MPA)

William Quincy Davis (born July 2, 1968) is a Democratic member of the Illinois House of Representatives, representing the 30th District since January 8, 2003. He is a member of the Illinois House Legislative Black Caucus.

== Early life and education ==
Davis was born on July 2, 1968, in Harvey, Illinois. He graduated from Southern Illinois University Carbondale in 1989, earning a Bachelor of Arts Degree Political Science in three years. In 2009, Davis completed his Master of Public Administration Degree at Governors State University. He is a member of Kappa Alpha Psi fraternity and a founding member of the Better Funding for Better Schools Coalition.

== Political career ==
Davis began serving in the Illinois House of Representatives on January 8, 2003. He is the Chair of the Health and Healthcare Disparities committee and Vice-Chairman of the Appropriations Elementary and Secondary Education committee. He also serves on the International Trade and Commerce, Labor, and Railroad Safety committees.

In 2005, Davis worked on legislation to increase access to quality and affordable health care for children, regardless of income. He also helped create the Illinois Cares Rx program, filling the gap in Medicare Part D coverage and ensuring that Illinois' senior citizens and disabled persons receive the best coverage possible under the federal plan.

Davis also supported House Bill 750, which would increase the education foundation level by $1,000 per pupil. This while providing $2.4 billion in property tax relief statewide.

In 2007 he sponsored legislation that would require Illinois public schools to begin each day with a moment of silence. The controversial bill passed the Illinois General Assembly but was vetoed by the Governor Blagojevich. Both Houses of the General Assembly voted to override the governor's veto and the bill became Illinois law.

On July 31, 2017 Davis was appointed a member of the Trade Policy Task Force for a term ending December 31, 2018. The Trade Policy Task Force's function is to analyze important issues relative to the growth of international trade and make recommendations to Congress, the United States Trade Representative, and the White House National Trade Council regarding trade policy. The Task Force also promotes Illinois as a market for exporting and importing.

As of July 3, 2022, Representative Davis is a member of the following Illinois House committees:

- (Chairman of) Appropriations - Elementary & Secondary Education Committee (HAPE)
- Appropriations - Public Safety (HAPP)
- Energy & Environment Committee (HENG)
- Executive Committee (HEXC)
- International Trade & Commerce (HITC)
- Labor & Commerce Committee (HLBR)
- Minority Impact Analysis Subcommittee (HLBR-MIAS)

== Electoral history ==
Illinois 30th State House District Democratic Primary, 2002
Party	Candidate	Votes	%
Democratic	William "Will" Davis	4,822	32.82
Democratic	Brenda L. Thompson	4,200	28.58
Democratic	Richard F. Kelly Jr.	2,364	16.09
Democratic	Willis A. Harris	1,761	11.98
Democratic	Kevin J. Whitney	986	6.71
Democratic	Ronald V. Cummings	561	3.82
Total votes		14,694	100.0

Illinois 30th State House District General Election, 2002
Party	Candidate	Votes	%
Democratic	William "Will" Davis	19,419	79.56
Republican	Willie Jordan Jr.	4,988	20.44
Total votes		24,407	100.0

Illinois 30th State House District General Election, 2004
Party	Candidate	Votes	%
Democratic	William "Will" Davis (incumbent)	31,686	100.0
Total votes		31,686	100.0

Illinois 30th State House District General Election, 2006
Party	Candidate	Votes	%
Democratic	William "Will" Davis (incumbent)	20,001	100.0
Total votes		20,001	100.0

Illinois 30th State House District General Election, 2008
Party	Candidate	Votes	%
Democratic	William "Will" Davis (incumbent)	31,811	100.0
Total votes		31,811	100.0

Illinois 30th State House District General Election, 2010
Party	Candidate	Votes	%
Democratic	William "Will" Davis (incumbent)	22,546	99.33
Write-in votes	Keith Price	151	0.67
Total votes		22,697	100.0

Illinois 30th State House District General Election, 2012
Party	Candidate	Votes	%
Democratic	William "Will" Davis (incumbent)	32,246	100.0
Total votes		32,246	100.0

Illinois 30th State House District General Election, 2014
Party	Candidate	Votes	%
Democratic	William "Will" Davis (incumbent)	27,637	100.0
Total votes		27,637	100.0

Illinois 30th State House District General Election, 2016
Party	Candidate	Votes	%
Democratic	William "Will" Davis (incumbent)	34,641	100.0
Total votes		34,641	100.0

Illinois 30th State House District General Election, 2018
Party	Candidate	Votes	%
Democratic	William "Will" Davis (incumbent)	25,787	100.0
Total votes		25,787	100.0
