= Jenn Ladisch Douglass =

American politician in Illinois

Member of the Illinois House of Representatives from the 45th district
- In office January 11, 2023 – January 8, 2025
- Preceded by: Seth Lewis
- Succeeded by: Martha Deuter

Personal details
- Party: Democratic
- Education: University of Pittsburgh; University of Pittsburgh School of Law

Jenn Ladisch Douglass is an American politician who served as a member of the Illinois House of Representatives for the 45th district. In September 2023, she announced she would not seek re-election.
