= 2020 Illinois House of Representatives election =

- November 3, 2020

All 118 seats in the Illinois House of Representatives 60 seats needed for a majority
- Turnout: 64.61%
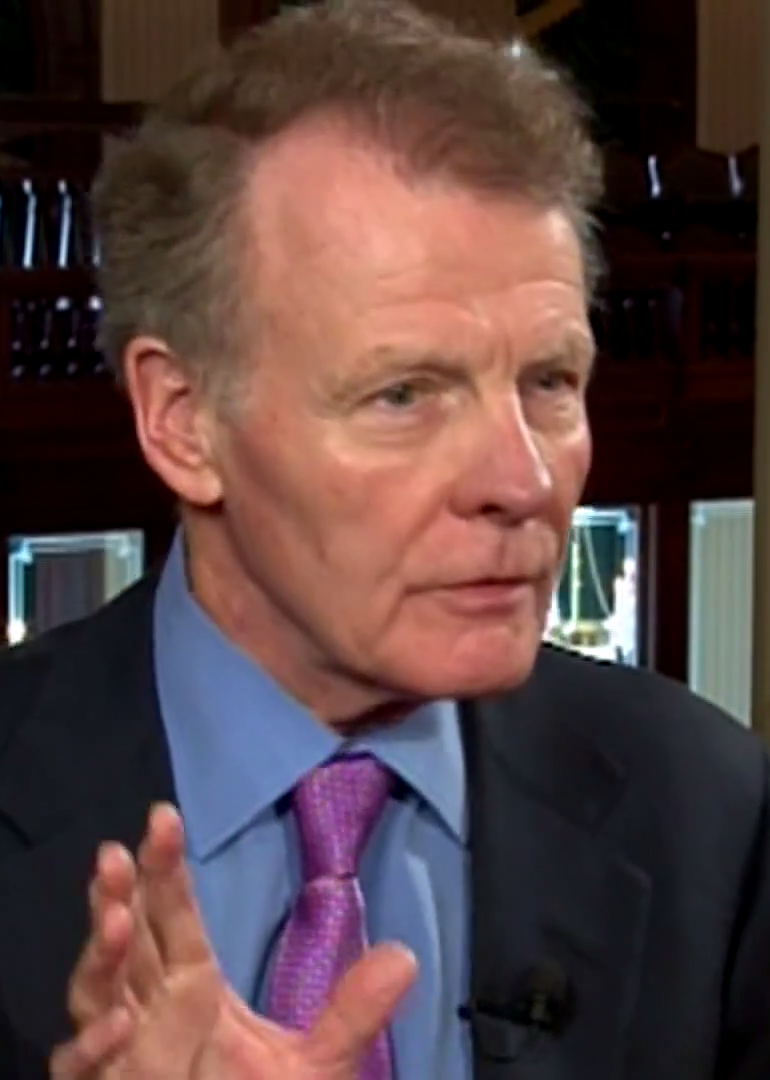

	Majority party	Minority party
Leader	Mike Madigan	Jim Durkin
Party	Democratic	Republican
Last election	74	44
Seats won	73	45
Seat change	▼1	▲1
Popular vote	3,157,943	2,113,389
Percentage	58.44%	39.11%
Swing	▼1.20%	▼1.15%
- Democratic gain Republican gain Democratic hold Republican hold 50–60% 60–70% 70–80% 80–90% >90% 50–60% 60–70% 70–80% 80–90% >90%
Speaker before election
Mike Madigan
Democratic
Elected Speaker
Emanuel "Chris" Welch
Democratic

The 2020 elections for the Illinois House of Representatives were held on Tuesday, November 3, 2020, to elect representatives from all 118 districts. The primary election occurred on March 17, 2020. The winners of this election are currently serving in the 102nd General Assembly, with seats apportioned among the states based on the 2010 United States census. The Democratic Party had held a House majority since 1997. The inauguration of the 102nd General Assembly occurred on Wednesday January 13, 2021.

The elections for the Illinois Fair Tax, United States President, Illinois United States Senator, Illinois's 18 congressional districts, and the Illinois Senate were held on this date.

The Republican Party needed to flip control of 16 seats to earn a majority in the Illinois House. The Republican Party flipped four seats and the Democratic Party flipped three seats, resulting in a net gain of one additional seat for the Republicans. The Democratic Party retained their supermajority after this election.

== Predictions ==
Source	Ranking	As of
The Cook Political Report	Safe D	October 21, 2020

== Results ==
2020 Illinois House of Representatives general election
Party	Votes	Percentage	% Change	Candidates	Seats before	Seats after	+/–
Democratic	3,157,943	58.44%	▼1.20%	106	74	73	▼1
Republican	2,113,389	39.11%	▼1.15%	67	44	45	▲1
Libertarian	62,388	1.15%	Steady	9	0	0	Steady
Independent	41,731	0.77%	Steady	3	0	0	Steady
Green	20,992	0.39%	Steady	6	0	0	Steady
Constitution	5,092	0.09%	Steady	1	0	0	Steady
Pro-Gun Pro-Life	2,250	0.04%	Steady	1	0	0	Steady
Write-Ins	262	0.00%	Steady	5	0	0	Steady
Totals	5,404,047	100.00%	—	198	118	118	—

== Close races ==
District	Winner	Margin
District 20	Republican	9.2%
District 41	Democratic (gain)	3.36%
District 42	Republican	3.76%
District 45	Republican (gain)	6.44%
District 47	Republican	7.98%
District 48	Democratic	7.54%
District 49	Democratic	8.54%
District 51	Republican (gain)	1.74%
District 54	Republican	3.62%
District 63	Republican	9.54%
District 65	Republican	3.66%
District 66	Democratic (gain)	3.94%
District 68	Democratic (gain)	0.44%
District 76	Democratic	8.72%
District 81	Democratic	5.22%
District 96	Democratic	7.15%
District 97	Democratic	4.06%
District 111	Republican (gain)	8.7%
District 112	Democratic	7.34%

== Districts 1–25 ==
=== District 1 ===
The 1st district had been represented by Democrat Aaron Ortiz since January 9, 2019. Ortiz was unopposed in his first election in 2018. Ortiz faced Alicia Martinez, a worker with Brackenbox, Inc. and a former staffer for Alderman Edward M. Burke. After winning the nomination, Ortiz faced no other ballot-listed candidates in the general election.

==== Endorsements ====
Aaron Ortiz

Organizations

- Chicago Teachers Union
- Equality Illinois
- National Association of Social Workers Illinois chapter
- Planned Parenthood of Illinois Action
- SEIU Healthcare
- United Working Families

==== Results ====
Democratic primary
Party	Candidate	Votes	%
Democratic	Aaron M. Ortiz (incumbent)	6,643	57.84
Democratic	Alicia Elena Martinez	4,842	42.16
Total votes		11,485	100.0

General election
Party	Candidate	Votes	%
Democratic	Aaron M. Ortiz (incumbent)	21,204	100.0
Total votes		21,204	100.0
Democratic hold			

=== District 2 ===
The 2nd district includes all or parts of the Chicago neighborhoods of Armour Square, Bridgeport, Brighton Park, Lower West Side, McKinley Park, Near South Side, Near West Side, and New City. The district had been represented by Democrat Theresa Mah since January 11, 2017. Mah was re-elected unopposed in the 2018 election. Mah faced two primary challengers on March 17, 2020: Kenneth M. Kozlar, a retired research technician, and Bobby Martinez Olson, an attorney. After winning the nomination, Mah faced no ballot-listed candidates in the general election.

==== Endorsements ====
Theresa Mah

Organizations

- Chicago Teachers Union
- Equality Illinois
- National Association of Social Workers Illinois chapter
- Planned Parenthood of Illinois Action
- SEIU Healthcare
- United Working Families

==== Results ====
Democratic primary
Party	Candidate	Votes	%
Democratic	Theresa Mah (incumbent)	10,580	67.29
Democratic	Bobby Martinez Olson	4,428	28.16
Democratic	Kenneth M. Kozlar	715	4.55
Total votes		15,723	100.0

General election
Party	Candidate	Votes	%
Democratic	Theresa Mah (incumbent)	25,771	100.0
Total votes		25,771	100.0
Democratic hold			

=== District 3 ===
The 3rd district includes parts of Elmwood Park, as well as all or parts of the Chicago neighborhoods of Austin, Belmont Cragin, Dunning, Hermosa, Logan Square, Montclare, and Portage Park. The district had been represented by Democrat Luis Arroyo since his appointment in December 2006. Arroyo was re-elected unopposed in the 2018 election. Arroyo would resign from his seat on November 1, 2019, after he was arrested a week prior for a federal bribery charge and "just hours before a legislative committee was set to consider his ouster from the General Assembly." Eva-Dina Delgado was appointed to his seat on November 15, 2019. Her appointment came under contentious fire from Illinois House Speaker Michael Madigan after proxy votes from former representative Arroyo were used to select Delgado as his replacement. Delgado faced primary challenger Nidia Carranza, a bilingual Pre-K teacher, on March 17, 2020. After winning the nomination, Delgado faced no ballot-listed candidates in the general election.

==== Endorsements ====
Nidia Carranza

Organizations

- National Association of Social Workers Illinois chapter
- SEIU Healthcare
- United Working Families
Eva-Dina Delgado (general election)

Organizations

- Planned Parenthood of Illinois Action

==== Results ====
Democratic primary
Party	Candidate	Votes	%
Democratic	Eva-Dina Delgado (incumbent)	6,302	51.55
Democratic	Nidia Carranza	5,922	48.45
Total votes		12,224	100.0

General election
Party	Candidate	Votes	%
Democratic	Eva-Dina Delgado (incumbent)	25,453	100.0
Total votes		25,453	100.0
Democratic hold			

=== District 4 ===
The 4th district includes parts of the Chicago neighborhoods of Hermosa, Humboldt Park, Logan Square, and West Town. Ramirez was elected with 99.98% of the vote in 2018. The district had been represented by Democrat Delia Ramirez since January 9, 2019. Ramirez faced no other ballot-listed candidates in the general election.

==== Endorsements ====
Delia Ramirez

Organizations

- Chicago Teachers Union
- Equality Illinois
- Planned Parenthood of Illinois Action
- United Working Families

==== Results ====
Democratic primary
Party	Candidate	Votes	%
Democratic	Delia C. Ramirez (incumbent)	16,136	100.0
Total votes		16,136	100.0

General election
Party	Candidate	Votes	%
Democratic	Delia C. Ramirez (incumbent)	38,951	100.0
Total votes		38,951	100.0
Democratic hold			

=== District 5 ===
The 5th district includes parts of the Chicago neighborhoods of Armour Square, Avalon Park, Douglas, Englewood, Fuller Park, Grand Boulevard, Greater Grand Crossing, Loop, Near North Side, Near South Side, South Shore, Washington Park, and Woodlawn. The district had been represented by Democrat Lamont Robinson since January 9, 2019. Robinson was unopposed in his first election in 2018. Robinson faced no other ballot-listed candidates in the general election.

Lamont Robinson

Organizations

- Equality Illinois
- Planned Parenthood of Illinois Action

Democratic primary
Party	Candidate	Votes	%
Democratic	Lamont J. Robinson (incumbent)	18,079	100.0
Total votes		18,079	100.0

General election
Party	Candidate	Votes	%
Democratic	Lamont J. Robinson (incumbent)	43,918	100.0
Total votes		43,918	100.0
Democratic hold			

=== District 6 ===
The 6th district includes parts of the Chicago neighborhoods of Armour Square, Bridgeport, Chicago Lawn, Douglas, Englewood, Fuller Park, Grand Boulevard, Greater Grand Crossing, Loop, Near North Side, Near South Side, Near West Side, New City, and West Englewood. The district had been represented by Democrat Sonya Harper since her appointment in October 2015. Harper was re-elected unopposed in the 2018 election. Harper faced no other ballot-listed candidates in the general election.

Sonya Harper

Organizations

- Planned Parenthood of Illinois Action

Democratic primary
Party	Candidate	Votes	%
Democratic	Sonya Marie Harper (incumbent)	12,954	100.0
Total votes		12,954	100.0

General election
Party	Candidate	Votes	%
Democratic	Sonya Marie Harper (incumbent)	32,219	100.0
Total votes		32,219	100.0
Democratic hold			

=== District 7 ===
The 7th district, located in the Chicago area, includes all or parts of Bellwood, Berkeley, Broadview, Forest Park, Hillside, La Grange Park, Maywood, Melrose Park, Northlake, Oak Brook, River Forest, Westchester, and Western Springs. The district had been represented by Democrat Emanuel "Chris" Welch since January 9, 2013. Welch was re-elected unopposed in the 2018 election. Welch faced no other ballot-listed candidates in the general election.

Emanuel "Chris" Welch

Organizations

- Planned Parenthood of Illinois Action

Democratic primary
Party	Candidate	Votes	%
Democratic	Emanuel "Chris" Welch (incumbent)	19,406	100.0
Total votes		19,406	100.0

General election
Party	Candidate	Votes	%
Democratic	Emanuel "Chris" Welch (incumbent)	43,883	100.0
Total votes		43,883	100.0
Democratic hold			

=== District 8 ===
The 8th district, located in the Chicago area, includes all or parts of Berwyn, Brookfield, Forest Park, La Grange, La Grange Park, North Riverside, and Oak Park and parts of the Chicago neighborhood of Austin. The district had been represented by Democrat La Shawn Ford since January 10, 2007. Ford was re-elected unopposed in the 2018 election. Ford faced no other ballot-listed candidates in the general election.

La Shawn Ford

Organizations

- Planned Parenthood of Illinois Action

Democratic primary
Party	Candidate	Votes	%
Democratic	La Shawn K. Ford (incumbent)	18,036	100.0
Total votes		18,036	100.0

General election
Party	Candidate	Votes	%
Democratic	La Shawn K. Ford (incumbent)	36,932	100.0
Total votes		36,932	100.0
Democratic hold			

=== District 9 ===
The 9th district includes parts of the Chicago neighborhoods of East Garfield Park, Lincoln Park, Loop, Lower West Side, Near North Side, Near West Side, North Lawndale, South Lawndale, West Garfield Park, and West Town. The district had been represented by Democrat Art Turner since December 2010. Turner was re-elected unopposed in the 2018 election. In 2019, Turner would not seek re-election. Seven candidates ran for the Democratic nomination for the district:

- Lakesia Collins, union organizer
- Ty Cratic, political consultant and lobbyist
- Maurice Edwards, worker in Cook County government
- Nicole 'Nikki' Harvey, a director for Congressman Danny K. Davis' office
- Trina Mangrum, chief of staff to Alderman Jason Ervin
- Sandra Schneller, a state clinical practice manager
- Aaron Turner, formerly holding multiple positions with numerous Illinois agencies

After winning the nomination, Collins faced no other ballot-listed candidates in the general election. On July 3, 2020, Art Turner resigned from his seat to retire. Collins, the winner of the primary, was appointed to Turner's seat on July 24, 2020.

==== Endorsements ====
Lakesia Collins (general election)

Organizations

- Chicago Teachers Union
- Equality Illinois
- National Association of Social Workers Illinois chapter
- Planned Parenthood of Illinois Action
- SEIU Healthcare
- United Working Families
Ty Cratic

Organizations

- Equality Illinois

==== Results ====
Democratic primary
Party	Candidate	Votes	%
Democratic	Lakesia Collins	8,040	46.18
Democratic	Aaron Turner	2,603	14.95
Democratic	Trina Mangrum	1,850	10.63
Democratic	Tyjuan "Ty" Cratic	1,557	8.94
Democratic	Nicole L. 'Nikki' Harvey	1,494	8.58
Democratic	Sandra Schneller	1,161	6.67
Democratic	Maurice Edwards	704	4.04
Total votes		17,409	100.0

General election
Party	Candidate	Votes	%
Democratic	Lakesia Collins (incumbent)	38,252	100.0
Total votes		38,252	100.0
Democratic hold			

=== District 10 ===
The 10th district includes parts of the Chicago neighborhoods of Austin, East Garfield Park, Humboldt Park, Lincoln Park, Logan Square, Near North Side, Near West Side, West Garfield Park, and West Town. The district had been represented by Democrat Melissa Conyears-Ervin since January 11, 2017. Conyears-Ervin was re-elected unopposed in the 2018 election. Conyears-Ervin would later be elected as City Treasurer of Chicago and leave her seat open. Democrat Jawaharial Williams was appointed to her seat in May 2019. Williams faced two primary challengers: Gerard Moorer, a deputy district director for Illinois's 7th congressional district; and Gina Zuccaro. After winning the nomination, Williams faced no other ballot-listed candidates in the general election.

==== Endorsements ====
Jawaharial "Omar" Williams

Organizations

- Chicago Teachers Union
- Equality Illinois
- Planned Parenthood of Illinois Action
- SEIU Healthcare

==== Results ====
Democratic primary
Party	Candidate	Votes	%
Democratic	Jawaharial "Omar" Williams (incumbent)	8,334	45.19
Democratic	Gerard C. Moorer	5,872	31.84
Democratic	Gina Zuccaro	4,237	22.97
Total votes		18,443	100.0

General election
Party	Candidate	Votes	%
Democratic	Jawaharial "Omar" Williams (incumbent)	38,256	100.0
Total votes		38,256	100.0
Democratic hold			

=== District 11 ===
The 11th district includes parts of the Chicago neighborhoods of Albany Park, Avondale, Irving Park, Lake View, Lincoln Park, Lincoln Square, Logan Square, and North Center. The district had been represented by Democrat Ann Williams since January 12, 2011. Williams was re-elected unopposed in the 2018 election. Williams faced no other ballot-listed candidates in the general election.

Ann Williams

Organizations

- Equality Illinois
- Planned Parenthood of Illinois Action

Democratic primary
Party	Candidate	Votes	%
Democratic	Ann M. Williams (incumbent)	23,890	100.0
Total votes		23,890	100.0

General election
Party	Candidate	Votes	%
Democratic	Ann M. Williams (incumbent)	50,970	100.0
Total votes		50,970	100.0
Democratic hold			

=== District 12 ===
The 12th district includes parts of the Chicago neighborhoods of Lake View, Lincoln Park, Near North Side, and Uptown. The district had been represented by Democrat Sara Feigenholtz since January 11, 1995. Feigenholtz was re-elected unopposed in the 2018 election. Feigenholtz would become a state senator on January 20, 2020, to fill the vacancy left by former president of the Illinois Senate John Cullerton. The Democratic primary featured six candidates:

- Margaret Croke, deputy chief of staff for the Illinois Department of Commerce and Economic Opportunity
- James "Jimmy" Garfield, attorney
- Marty Malone, co-founder of the organization Queer Clout Happy Hour
- Yoni Pizer, community liaison for Congressman Mike Quigley
- Ryan Podges, an attorney in labor and employment laws
- Kimberly J. Walz, regional director for Walgreens

38 days before the primary was scheduled to occur, Yoni Pizer was appointed to the seat on February 9, 2020. Chicago Magazine reported candidate Croke (who would later defeat Pizer in the primary) saying, "This Sunday, 38 days before voters have the opportunity to vote for the next State Representative for Illinois’ 12th House District, Chicago Democratic Party insiders rubber stamped the appointment of Jonathan Pizer in an attempt to boost his chances in the March primary election."

After winning the nomination, Croke faced no other ballot-listed candidates in the general election.

Margaret Croke (general election)

Organizations

- Equality Illinois
- Planned Parenthood of Illinois Action
Yoni Pizer

Organizations

- Equality Illinois

Democratic primary
Party	Candidate	Votes	%
Democratic	Margaret Croke	12,380	45.85
Democratic	Jonathan A. "Yoni" Pizer (incumbent)	11,168	41.36
Democratic	James A. "Jimmy" Garfield	1,652	6.12
Democratic	Ryan Podges	1,061	3.93
Democratic	Marty Malone	741	2.74
Total votes		27,002	100.0

General election
Party	Candidate	Votes	%
Democratic	Margaret Croke	52,483	100.0
Total votes		52,483	100.0
Democratic hold			

=== District 13 ===
The 13th district includes parts of the Chicago neighborhoods of Albany Park, Edgewater, Lake View, North Center, North Park, Rogers Park, Uptown, and West Ridge. The district had been represented by Democrat Greg Harris since December 2006. Harris was re-elected unopposed in the 2018 election. Harris faced no other ballot-listed candidates in the general election.

Greg Harris

Organizations

- Equality Illinois
- Planned Parenthood of Illinois Action

Democratic primary
Party	Candidate	Votes	%
Democratic	Greg Harris (incumbent)	24,229	100.0
Total votes		24,229	100.0

General election
Party	Candidate	Votes	%
Democratic	Greg Harris (incumbent)	46,016	100.0
Total votes		46,016	100.0
Democratic hold			

=== District 14 ===
The 14th district, located in the Chicago area, includes parts of Evanston and includes parts of the Chicago neighborhoods of Edgewater, Rogers Park, Uptown, and West Ridge. The district had been represented by Democrat Kelly Cassidy since her appointment in May 2011. Cassidy was re-elected unopposed in the 2018 election. Cassidy faced no other ballot-listed candidates in the general election.

Kelly Cassidy

Organizations

- Equality Illinois
- Planned Parenthood of Illinois Action

Democratic primary
Party	Candidate	Votes	%
Democratic	Kelly M. Cassidy (incumbent)	22,873	100.0
Total votes		22,873	100.0

General election
Party	Candidate	Votes	%
Democratic	Kelly M. Cassidy (incumbent)	41,907	100.0
Total votes		41,907	100.0
Democratic hold			

=== District 15 ===
The 15th district, located in the Chicago area, includes parts of Glenview, Morton Grove, Niles, Park Ridge, and Skokie and includes parts of the Chicago neighborhoods of Albany Park, Forest Glen, Irving Park, Jefferson Park, North Park, and Norwood Park. The district had been represented by Democrat John D'Amico since November 2004. D'Amico was re-elected with 61.50% of the vote in 2018. D'Amico faced no other ballot-listed candidates in the general election.

John C. D'Amico

Organizations

- Equality Illinois
- Planned Parenthood Illinois Action Fund

Democratic primary
Party	Candidate	Votes	%
Democratic	John C. D'Amico (incumbent)	14,179	100.0
Total votes		14,179	100.0

General election
Party	Candidate	Votes	%
Democratic	John C. D'Amico (incumbent)	35,587	100.0
Total votes		35,587	100.0
Democratic hold			

=== District 16 ===
The 16th district, located in the Chicago area, includes parts of Lincolnwood, Morton Grove, and Skokie and includes parts of the Chicago neighborhoods of North Park and West Ridge. The district had been represented by Democrat Yehiel Mark Kalish since his appointment in January 2019. Kalish faced two primary challengers for the Democratic nomination: Kevin Olickal, executive director at the Indo-American Democratic Organization and Denyse Wang Stoneback, an independent contractor for project management. Stoneback defeated incumbent Kalish in the primary for the Democratic nomination and faced no other ballot-listed candidates in the general election.

==== Endorsements ====
Yehiel "Mark" Kalish

Organizations

- Equality Illinois
Denyse Wang-Stoneback (general election)

Organizations

- Chicago Teachers Union
- Equality Illinois
- National Association of Social Workers Illinois chapter
- Planned Parenthood Illinois Action

==== Results ====
Democratic primary
Party	Candidate	Votes	%
Democratic	Denyse Wang Stoneback	7,749	43.16
Democratic	Yehiel "Mark" Kalish (incumbent)	5,799	32.30
Democratic	Kevin Olickal	4,407	24.54
Total votes		17,955	100.0

Republican primary
Party	Candidate	Votes	%
Republican	Brian Lee O'Donnell (write-in)	75	100.0
Total votes		75	100.0

General election
Party	Candidate	Votes	%
Democratic	Denyse Wang Stoneback	32,660	100.0
Total votes		32,660	100.0
Democratic hold			

=== District 17 ===
The 17th district, located in the Chicago area, includes all or parts of Evanston, Glenview, Golf, Morton Grove, Northbrook, Skokie, and Wilmette. The district had been represented by Democrat Jennifer Gong-Gershowitz since January 9, 2019. Gong-Gershowitz was first elected with 69.20% of the vote in 2018. Gong-Gershowitz faced Green Party Christopher Kruger and Republican Yesoe Yoon, anchor and host for the Global Leaders Network TV Program, in the general election.

==== Endorsements ====
Jennifer Gong-Gershowitz

Organizations

- Equality Illinois
- Planned Parenthood Illinois Action

==== Results ====
Democratic primary
Party	Candidate	Votes	%
Democratic	Jennifer Gong-Gershowitz (incumbent)	21,489	100.0
Total votes		21,489	100.0

Republican primary
Party	Candidate	Votes	%
Republican	Yesoe Yoon	2,238	100.0
Total votes		2,238	100.0

General election
Party	Candidate	Votes	%
Democratic	Jennifer Gong-Gershowitz (incumbent)	42,471	67.62
Republican	Yesoe Yoon	18,728	29.82
Green	Christopher Kruger	1,606	2.56
Total votes		62,805	100.0
Democratic hold			

=== District 18 ===
The 18th district, located in the Chicago area, includes all or parts of Deerfield, Evanston, Glencoe, Glenview, Kenilworth, Northbrook, Northfield, Wilmette, and Winnetka. The district had been represented by Democrat Robyn Gabel since her appointment in April 2010. Gabel was re-elected with 72.09% of the vote in 2018. Gabel faced Independent candidate Sean Matlis in the general election.

Robyn Gabel

Organizations

- Equality Illinois
- Planned Parenthood Illinois Action

Democratic primary
Party	Candidate	Votes	%
Democratic	Robyn Gabel (incumbent)	23,991	100.0
Total votes		23,991	100.0

General election
Party	Candidate	Votes	%
Democratic	Robyn Gabel (incumbent)	43,607	72.31
Independent	Sean Matlis	16,699	27.69
Total votes		60,306	100.0
Democratic hold			

=== District 19 ===
The 19th district, located in the Chicago area, includes parts of Elmwood Park, Harwood Heights, Norridge, and River Grove and includes parts of the Chicago neighborhoods of Dunning, Forest Glen, Jefferson Park, Norwood Park, O'Hare, and Portage Park. The district had been represented by Democrat Robert Martwick since January 9, 2013. Martwick was re-elected with 60.69% of the vote in 2018. Martwick would be appointed to replace former state senator John Mulroe, leaving Martwick's own seat vacant. Democrat Lindsey LaPointe would be appointed to the 19th district seat on July 24, 2019. LaPointe faced two primary challengers for the Democratic nomination: Patti Vasquez, former host of "The Patti Vasquez Show" on 720 WGN radio and Joe Duplechin, Chicago police officer. LaPointe faced Republican Jeff Muehlfelder, a violent crimes detective, and Libertarian Joseph Schreiner, a patent agent and translator, in the general election.

==== Endorsements ====
Lindsey LaPointe

Organizations

- Chicago Teachers Union
- Equality Illinois
- National Association of Social Workers Illinois chapter
- Planned Parenthood Illinois Action
- SEIU Healthcare

==== Results ====
Democratic primary
Party	Candidate	Votes	%
Democratic	Lindsey LaPointe (incumbent)	7,295	42.56
Democratic	Patricia D. "Patti Vasquez" Bonnin	5,979	34.89
Democratic	Joe Duplechin	3,865	22.55
Total votes		17,139	100.0

Republican primary
Party	Candidate	Votes	%
Republican	Jeff Muehlfelder	1,861	100.0
Total votes		1,861	100.0

General election
Party	Candidate	Votes	%
Democratic	Lindsey LaPointe (incumbent)	27,823	58.40
Republican	Jeff Muehlfelder	18,277	38.36
Libertarian	Joseph Schreiner	1,544	3.24
Total votes		47,644	100.0
Democratic hold			

=== District 20 ===
The 20th district, located in the Chicago area, includes parts of Des Plaines, Franklin Park, Harwood Heights, Niles, Norridge, Park Ridge, Rosemont, and Schiller Park and includes parts of the Chicago neighborhoods of Dunning, Edison Park, Norwood Park, and O'Hare. The district had been represented by Republican Michael McAuliffe since his appointment in July 1996. McAuliffe was re-elected unopposed in 2018. McAuliffe would retire as state representative and would be succeeded by Rosemont mayor Bradley Stephens in June 2019. Two candidates ran for the Democratic nomination: R. Cary Capparelli, an online instructor in Geography and Geo-Science for South Dakota State University and Michelle Darbro, a firefighter and paramedic. Stephens faced Democrat Michelle Darbro in the general election.

==== Endorsements ====
Michelle Darbro

Organizations

- Chicago Teachers Union
- Equality Illinois
- Illinois AFL–CIO
- Planned Parenthood Illinois Action

==== Results ====
Democratic primary
Party	Candidate	Votes	%
Democratic	Michelle Darbro	9,921	66.92
Democratic	R. Cary Capparelli	4,905	33.07
Total votes		14,826	100.0

Republican primary
Party	Candidate	Votes	%
Republican	Brad Stephens (incumbent)	3,705	100.0
Total votes		3,705	100.0

General election
Party	Candidate	Votes	%
Republican	Brad Stephens (incumbent)	28,314	54.60
Democratic	Michelle Darbro	23,546	45.40
Total votes		51,860	100.0
Republican hold			

=== District 21 ===
The 21st district, located in the Chicago area, includes parts of Bedford Park, Bridgeview, Cicero, Forest View, Lyons, McCook, Riverside, Stickney, and Summit and includes parts of the Chicago neighborhoods of Brighton Park, Garfield Ridge, Lower West Side, McKinley Park, and South Lawndale. The district had been represented by Democrat Celina Villanueva since her appointment in July 2018. Villanueva was unopposed in her first election in 2018. Villanueva would become a state senator on January 7, 2020, to fill the vacancy left by former state senator Martin Sandoval and be succeeded by Edgar González Jr. on January 10, 2020. González Jr. faced no other ballot-listed candidates in the general election.

Edgar González Jr.

Organizations

- Planned Parenthood of Illinois Action

Democratic primary
Party	Candidate	Votes	%
Democratic	Edgar González Jr. (incumbent)	9,048	100.0
Total votes		9,048	100.0

General election
Party	Candidate	Votes	%
Democratic	Edgar González Jr. (incumbent)	22,403	100.0
Total votes		22,403	100.0
Democratic hold			

=== District 22 ===
The 22nd district, located in the Chicago area, includes parts of Bedford Park and Burbank and includes all or parts of the Chicago neighborhoods of Archer Heights, Ashburn, Brighton Park, Chicago Lawn, Clearing, Gage Park, Garfield Ridge, West Elsdon, and West Lawn. The district had been represented by Mike Madigan since January 13, 1971. He was the 67th Speaker of the House from 1983 to 1995 and had been the 69th Speaker of the House since 1997. Madigan was re-elected unopposed in 2018. Madigan faced no other ballot-listed candidates in the general election.

Michael Madigan

Organizations

- Planned Parenthood of Illinois Action

Democratic primary
Party	Candidate	Votes	%
Democratic	Michael J. Madigan (incumbent)	13,740	99.99
Democratic	Richard Mayers (write-in)	1	0.01
Total votes		13,741	100.0

General election
Party	Candidate	Votes	%
Democratic	Michael J. Madigan (incumbent)	29,041	99.98
Write-in		6	0.02
Total votes		29,047	100.0
Democratic hold			

=== District 23 ===
The 23rd district, located in the Chicago area, includes parts of Bedford Park, Berwyn, Bridgeview, Brookfield, Burbank, Cicero, Countryside, Hickory Hills, Hodgkins, Justice, La Grange, La Grange Park, McCook, Riverside, and Summit. The district had been represented by Democrat Michael J. Zalewski since December 2008. Zalewski was re-elected unopposed in 2018. Zalewski faced no other ballot-listed candidates in the general election.

Michael Zalewski

Organizations

- Planned Parenthood of Illinois Action

Democratic primary
Party	Candidate	Votes	%
Democratic	Michael J. Zalewski (incumbent)	9,868	100.0
Total votes		9,868	100.0

General election
Party	Candidate	Votes	%
Democratic	Michael J. Zalewski (incumbent)	26,817	100.0
Total votes		26,817	100.0
Democratic hold			

=== District 24 ===
The 24th district, located in the Chicago area, includes parts of Berwyn, Brookfield, Cicero, Riverside, and Stickney and includes parts of the Chicago neighborhood of South Lawndale. The district had been represented by Democrat Elizabeth "Lisa" Hernandez since January 10, 2007. Hernandez was re-elected unopposed in 2018. Hernandez faced no other ballot-listed candidates in the general election.

Elizabeth "Lisa" Hernandez

Organizations

- Planned Parenthood of Illinois Action

Democratic primary
Party	Candidate	Votes	%
Democratic	Elizabeth "Lisa" Hernandez (incumbent)	9,998	100.0
Total votes		9,998	100.0

General election
Party	Candidate	Votes	%
Democratic	Elizabeth "Lisa" Hernandez (incumbent)	26,824	100.0
Total votes		26,824	100.0
Democratic hold			

=== District 25 ===
The 25th district includes parts of the Chicago neighborhoods of Calumet Heights, East Side, Hegewisch, Hyde Park, Kenwood, South Chicago, South Deering, South Shore, and Woodlawn. The district had been represented by Democrat Curtis Tarver since January 9, 2019. Tarver was elected with 99.93% of the vote in 2018. Tarver faced no other ballot-listed candidates in the general election.

Curtis Tarver II

Organizations

- Planned Parenthood of Illinois Action

Democratic primary
Party	Candidate	Votes	%
Democratic	Curtis J. Tarver II (incumbent)	17,806	100.0
Total votes		17,806	100.0

General election
Party	Candidate	Votes	%
Democratic	Curtis J. Tarver II (incumbent)	35,396	100.0
Total votes		35,396	100.0
Democratic hold			

== Districts 26–50 ==
=== District 26 ===
The 26th district includes parts of the Chicago neighborhoods of Calumet Heights, Douglas, Grand Boulevard, Hyde Park, Kenwood, Loop, Near North Side, Near South Side, South Chicago, South Shore, Washington Park, and Woodlawn. The district had been represented by Democrat Christian Mitchell since January 9, 2013. After winning his election and the election of Governor J. B. Pritzker, Mitchell would join the Pritzker administration as a deputy governor. Kam Buckner was appointed on January 18, 2019, to serve out the remainder of Mitchell's term. Buckner faced no other ballot-listed candidates in the general election.

==== Endorsements ====
Kam Buckner

Organizations

- Chicago Teachers Union
- National Association of Social Workers Illinois chapter
- Planned Parenthood Illinois Action
- SEIU Healthcare

==== Results ====
Democratic primary
Party	Candidate	Votes	%
Democratic	Kam Buckner (incumbent)	17,378	100.0
Total votes		17,378	100.0

General election
Party	Candidate	Votes	%
Democratic	Kam Buckner (incumbent)	41,804	100.0
Write-in		1	0.00
Total votes		41,805	100.0
Democratic hold			

=== District 27 ===
The 27th district, located in the Chicago area, includes parts of Alsip, Blue Island, Crestwood, Midlothian, Orland Park, Palos Heights, Robbins, and Worth and parts of the Chicago neighborhoods of Auburn Gresham, Beverly, Chatham, Morgan Park, Roseland, Washington Heights, and West Pullman. The district had been represented by Democrat Justin Slaughter since his appointment in January 2017. Slaughter was re-elected unopposed in 2018. Slaughter faced no other ballot-listed candidates in the general election.

==== Endorsements ====
Justin Slaughter

Organizations

- Chicago Teachers Union
- National Association of Social Workers Illinois chapter
- Planned Parenthood Illinois Action
- SEIU Healthcare

==== Results ====
Democratic primary
Party	Candidate	Votes	%
Democratic	Justin Q. Slaughter (incumbent)	20,194	99.99
Democratic	Marlo Barnett (write-in)	3	0.01
Total votes		20,197	100.0

General election
Party	Candidate	Votes	%
Democratic	Justin Q. Slaughter (incumbent)	41,616	100.0
Total votes		41,616	100.0
Democratic hold			

=== District 28 ===
The 28th district, located in the Chicago area, includes parts of Blue Island, Calumet Park, Crestwood, Midlothian, Oak Forest, Orland Park, Riverdale, Robbins, and Tinley Park and parts of the Chicago neighborhoods of Morgan Park, Roseland, and West Pullman. The district had been represented by Democrat Robert Rita since January 8, 2003. Rita was re-elected unopposed in 2018. Rita faced no other ballot-listed candidates in the general election.

Robert "Bob" Rita

Organizations

- Planned Parenthood Illinois Action

Democratic primary
Party	Candidate	Votes	%
Democratic	Robert "Bob" Rita (incumbent)	15,391	100.0
Total votes		15,391	100.0

General election
Party	Candidate	Votes	%
Democratic	Robert "Bob" Rita (incumbent)	37,640	99.36
Write-in		243	0.64
Total votes		37,883	100.0
Democratic hold			

=== District 29 ===
The 29th district, located in the Chicago area, includes parts of Calumet Heights, Chicago Heights, Crete, Dolton, East Hazel Crest, Ford Heights, Glenwood, Harvey, Homewood, Lansing, Lynwood, Monee, Phoenix, Sauk Village, South Chicago Heights, South Holland, Steger, Thornton, and University Park and parts of the Chicago neighborhoods of Riverdale and West Pullman. The district had been represented by Democrat Thaddeus Jones since January 12, 2011. Jones was re-elected unopposed in 2018. Jones faced a primary challenge from DeAndre Tillman, a partner attorney, for the Democratic nomination. After winning the nomination, Jones faced no other ballot-listed candidates in the general election.

==== Endorsements ====
Thaddeus Jones

Organizations

- Chicago Teachers Union
- SEIU Healthcare

==== Results ====
Democratic primary
Party	Candidate	Votes	%
Democratic	Thaddeus Jones (incumbent)	10,820	54.45
Democratic	DeAndre Tillman	9,053	45.55
Total votes		19,873	100.0

General election
Party	Candidate	Votes	%
Democratic	Thaddeus Jones (incumbent)	42,578	100.0
Total votes		42,578	100.0
Democratic hold			

=== District 30 ===
The 30th district, located in the Chicago area, includes all or parts of Blue Island, Dixmoor, Dolton, East Hazel Crest, Flossmoor, Harvey, Hazel Crest, Homewood, Markham, Midlothian, Oak Forest, Phoenix, Posen, Riverdale, and Robbins. The district had been represented by Democrat Will Davis since January 8, 2003. Davis was re-elected unopposed in 2018. Davis faced no other ballot-listed candidates in the general election.

Will Davis

Organizations

- Planned Parenthood Illinois Action

Democratic primary
Party	Candidate	Votes	%
Democratic	William "Will" Davis (incumbent)	13,535	100.0
Total votes		13,535	100.0

General election
Party	Candidate	Votes	%
Democratic	William "Will" Davis (incumbent)	33,359	100.0
Total votes		33,359	100.0
Democratic hold			

=== District 31 ===
The 31st district, located in the Chicago area, includes parts of Bedford Park, Bridgeview, Burr Ridge, Chicago Ridge, Countryside, Hickory Hills, Hodgkins, Hometown, Indian Head Park, Justice, Oak Lawn, Palos Hills, and Willow Springs and parts of the Chicago neighborhoods of Ashburn, Auburn Gresham, Chatham, Chicago Lawn, Englewood, Greater Grand Crossing, and West Englewood. The district had been represented by Democrat Mary E. Flowers since January 9, 1985. Flowers was re-elected unopposed in 2018. Flowers faced Samantha Simpson, a former consulting manager for Deloitte, for the Democratic nomination. After winning the nomination, Flowers faced no other ballot-listed candidates in the general election.

==== Endorsements ====
Mary Flowers

Organizations

- Chicago Teachers Union
- Planned Parenthood Illinois Action
- SEIU Healthcare

==== Results ====
Democratic primary
Party	Candidate	Votes	%
Democratic	Mary E. Flowers (incumbent)	13,449	71.78
Democratic	Samantha Simpson	5,287	28.22
Total votes		18,736	100.0

General election
Party	Candidate	Votes	%
Democratic	Mary E. Flowers (incumbent)	35,126	100.0
Total votes		35,126	100.0
Democratic hold			

=== District 32 ===
The 32nd district, located in the Chicago area, includes parts of Bridgeview, Burbank, Hickory Hills, Justice, and Oak Lawn and includes parts of the Chicago neighborhoods of Ashburn, Chicago Lawn, Englewood, Greater Grand Crossing, West Englewood, and Woodlawn. The district had been represented by Democrat Andre Thapedi since January 14, 2009. Thapedi was re-elected unopposed in 2018. Thapedi faced Ricky Gandhi, an economist, for the Democratic nomination. After winning the nomination, Thapedi faced no other ballot-listed candidates in the general election.

==== Endorsements ====
André Thapedi

Organizations

- Chicago Teachers Union
- Equality Illinois
- National Association of Social Workers Illinois chapter
- Planned Parenthood Illinois Action
- SEIU Healthcare

==== Results ====
Democratic primary
Party	Candidate	Votes	%
Democratic	André Thapedi (incumbent)	7,824	57.82
Democratic	Ricky Gandhi	5,708	42.18
Total votes		13,532	100.0

General election
Party	Candidate	Votes	%
Democratic	André Thapedi (incumbent)	26,680	100.0
Total votes		26,680	100.0
Democratic hold			

=== District 33 ===
The 33rd district, located in the Chicago area, includes parts of Burnham, Calumet City, Ford Heights, Lansing, Lynwood, and Sauk Village and includes all or parts of the Chicago neighborhoods of Avalon Park, Burnside, Calumet Heights, Chatham, East Side, Hegewisch, South Chicago, and South Deering. The district had been represented by Democrat Marcus C. Evans Jr. since his appointment in April 2012. Evans was re-elected unopposed in 2018. Evans faced no other ballot-listed candidates in the general election.

==== Endorsements ====
Marcus Evans

Organizations

- Planned Parenthood Illinois Action
- SEIU Healthcare

==== Results ====
Democratic primary
Party	Candidate	Votes	%
Democratic	Marcus C. Evans Jr. (incumbent)	18,735	100.0
Total votes		18,735	100.0

General election
Party	Candidate	Votes	%
Democratic	Marcus C. Evans Jr. (incumbent)	39,641	100.0
Total votes		39,641	100.0
Democratic hold			

=== District 34 ===
The 34th district, located in the Chicago area, includes all or parts of Beecher, Bourbonnais, Burnham, Calumet City, Crete, Ford Heights, Grant Park, Lansing, Lynwood, Manteno, Momence, Peotone, Sauk Village, South Holland, and Willowbrook and includes all or parts of the Chicago neighborhoods of Chatham, Greater Grand Crossing, Hegewisch, Pullman, Riverdale, Roseland, South Deering, and West Pullman. The district had been represented by Democrat Nicholas Smith since his appointment on February 4, 2018. Smith was elected unopposed in 2018. Smith faced no other ballot-listed candidates in the general election.

Nick Smith

Organizations

- Planned Parenthood Illinois Action

Democratic primary
Party	Candidate	Votes	%
Democratic	Nicholas "Nick" Smith (incumbent)	16,645	100.0
Total votes		16,645	100.0

General election
Party	Candidate	Votes	%
Democratic	Nicholas "Nick" Smith (incumbent)	40,279	100.0
Total votes		40,279	100.0
Democratic hold			

=== District 35 ===
The 35th district, located in the Chicago area, includes all or parts of Alsip, Chicago Ridge, Merrionette Park, Oak Lawn, Orland Hills, Orland Park, Palos Heights, Palos Park, Tinley Park, and Worth and includes parts of the Chicago neighborhoods of Auburn Gresham, Beverly, Morgan Park, Mount Greenwood, and Washington Heights. The district had been represented by Democrat Frances Ann Hurley since January 9, 2013. Hurley was re-elected with 68.82% of the vote in 2018. Herbert Hebein, former Chicago police officer and Republican candidate for the 35th district in 2018, was the Republican nominee.

==== Endorsements ====
Frances Ann Hurley

Organizations

- Equality Illinois

Democratic primary
Party	Candidate	Votes	%
Democratic	Frances Ann Hurley (incumbent)	19,330	100.0
Total votes		19,330	100.0

Republican primary
Party	Candidate	Votes	%
Republican	Herbert Hebein	2,234	100.0
Total votes		2,234	100.0

General election
Party	Candidate	Votes	%
Democratic	Frances Ann Hurley (incumbent)	37,169	64.24
Republican	Herbert Hebein	20,695	35.76
Total votes		57,864	100.0
Democratic hold			

=== District 36 ===
The 36th district, located in the Chicago area, includes parts of Chicago Ridge, Evergreen Park, Oak Lawn, Palos Heights, Palos Park, Willow Springs, and Worth and includes parts of the Chicago neighborhoods of Ashburn, Auburn Gresham, Beverly, and Mount Greenwood. The district had been represented by Democrat Kelly M. Burke since January 12, 2011. Burke was re-elected unopposed in 2018. Burke faced no other ballot-listed candidates in the general election.

Kelly Burke

Organizations

- Equality Illinois

Democratic primary
Party	Candidate	Votes	%
Democratic	Kelly M. Burke (incumbent)	16,745	100.0
Total votes		16,745	100.0

General election
Party	Candidate	Votes	%
Democratic	Kelly M. Burke (incumbent)	39,536	100.0
Total votes		39,536	100.0
Democratic hold			

=== District 37 ===
The 37th district, located in the Chicago area, includes parts of Frankfort, Frankfort Square, Homer Glen, Joliet, Lockport, Mokena, New Lenox, Orland Park, and Tinley Park. The district had been represented by Republican Margo McDermed since January 14, 2015. McDermed was re-elected with 57.98% of the vote in 2018. McDermed announced on July 10, 2019, that she would not seek re-election to the Illinois House. Tim Ozinga, executive vice president at Ozinga, a concrete and building materials business, was the Republican nominee. Michelle Fadeley, a global marketing manager, was the Democratic nominee.

Michelle Fadeley

Organizations

- Equality Illinois
- Planned Parenthood Illinois Action

Democratic primary
Party	Candidate	Votes	%
Democratic	Michelle Fadeley	11,069	100.0
Total votes		11,069	100.0

Republican primary
Party	Candidate	Votes	%
Republican	Tim Ozinga	5,862	100.0
Total votes		5,862	100.0

General election
Party	Candidate	Votes	%
Republican	Tim Ozinga	41,115	63.67
Democratic	Michelle Fadeley	23,465	36.33
Total votes		64,580	100.0
Republican hold			

=== District 38 ===
The 38th district, located in the Chicago area, includes parts of Country Club Hills, Flossmoor, Frankfort, Frankfort Square, Harvey, Hazel Crest, Homewood, Markham, Matteson, Oak Forest, Olympia Fields, Park Forest, Richton Park, Tinley Park, and University Park. The district had been represented by Democrat Debbie Meyers-Martin since January 9, 2019. Meyers-Martin was elected unopposed in 2018. Max Solomon, an attorney and former Democratic primary candidate for the 38th district in 2018, was the Republican nominee.

Democratic primary
Party	Candidate	Votes	%
Democratic	Debbie Meyers-Martin (incumbent)	19,576	100.0
Total votes		19,576	100.0

Republican primary
Party	Candidate	Votes	%
Republican	Max Solomon	1,411	100.0
Total votes		1,411	100.0

General election
Party	Candidate	Votes	%
Democratic	Debbie Meyers-Martin (incumbent)	41,305	77.47
Republican	Max Solomon	12,010	22.53
Total votes		53,315	100.0
Democratic hold			

=== District 39 ===
The 39th district includes parts of the Chicago neighborhoods of Avondale, Belmont Cragin, Dunning, Hermosa, Irving Park, Logan Square, and Portage Park. The district had been represented by Democrat Will Guzzardi since January 14, 2015. Guzzardi was re-elected unopposed in 2018. Guzzardi faced no other ballot-listed candidates in the general election.

==== Endorsements ====
Will Guzzardi

Organizations

- Chicago Teachers Union
- Equality Illinois
- United Working Families

==== Results ====
Democratic primary
Party	Candidate	Votes	%
Democratic	Will Guzzardi (incumbent)	13,687	100.0
Total votes		13,687	100.0

General election
Party	Candidate	Votes	%
Democratic	Will Guzzardi (incumbent)	33,816	100.0
Total votes		33,816	100.0
Democratic hold			

=== District 40 ===
The 40th district includes parts of the Chicago neighborhoods of Albany Park, Avondale, Irving Park, Logan Square, and Portage Park. The district had been represented by Democrat Jaime Andrade Jr. since his appointment in August 2013. Andrade was re-elected with 99.98% of the vote in 2018. Andrade faced Syamala Krishnamsetty, an organizer, in the Democratic primary. After winning the nomination, Andrade Jr. faced no other ballot-listed candidates in the general election.

==== Endorsements ====
Jaime Andrade

Organizations

- Chicago Teachers Union
- Equality Illinois
- SEIU Healthcare

==== Results ====
Democratic primary
Party	Candidate	Votes	%
Democratic	Jaime M. Andrade Jr. (incumbent)	11,687	65.02
Democratic	Syamala Krishnamsetty	6,287	34.98
Total votes		17,974	100.0

General election
Party	Candidate	Votes	%
Democratic	Jaime M. Andrade Jr. (incumbent)	34,655	100.0
Total votes		34,655	100.0
Democratic hold			

=== District 41 ===
The 41st district, located in the Chicago area, includes parts of Bolingbrook, Naperville, and Warrenville. The district had been represented by Republican Grant Wehrli since January 14, 2015. Wehrli was re-elected with 52% of the vote in 2018. Two candidates ran for the Democratic nomination: Denika McMillen, a social worker and Janet Yang Rohr, director of global data at Morningstar, Inc. After each candidate won their respective nomination, Republican Grant Wehrli faced Democrat Janet Yang Rohr in the general election.

==== Endorsements ====
Denika McMillen

Organizations

- Equality Illinois
- National Association of Social Workers Illinois chapter
Janet Yang-Rohr

Elected officials

- Laura Ellman, state senator
- J. B. Pritzker, governor of Illinois
- Lauren Underwood, Congresswoman

Organizations

- Emily's List
- Equality Illinois
- Illinois AFL–CIO
- Moms Demand Action
- Planned Parenthood Illinois Action
- Stand for Children

==== Results ====
Democratic primary
Party	Candidate	Votes	%
Democratic	Janet Yang Rohr	10,246	70.13
Democratic	Denika McMillen	4,364	29.87
Total votes		14,610	100.0

Republican primary
Party	Candidate	Votes	%
Republican	Grant Wehrli (incumbent)	5,977	100.0
Total votes		5,977	100.0

General election
Party	Candidate	Votes	%
Democratic	Janet Yang Rohr	31,613	51.68
Republican	Grant Wehrli (incumbent)	29,558	48.32
Total votes		61,171	100.0
Democratic gain from Republican			

=== District 42 ===
The 42nd district, located in the Chicago area, includes all or parts of Carol Stream, Lisle, Naperville, Warrenville, West Chicago, Wheaton, and Winfield. The district had been represented by Republican Amy Grant since January 9, 2019. Grant was elected with 52.24% of the vote in 2018. Ken Mejia-Beal, an activist and community organizer, was the Democratic nominee.

Ken Mejia-Beal

Elected officials

- Sean Casten, US Representative
- US Representative Lauren Underwood

Newspapers

- Chicago Sun-Times

Organizations

- Equality Illinois
- LGBTQ Victory Fund

Individuals

- Renato Mariotti, former candidate for Illinois Attorney General

Democratic primary
Party	Candidate	Votes	%
Democratic	Ken Mejia-Beal	12,381	100.0
Total votes		12,381	100.0

Republican primary
Party	Candidate	Votes	%
Republican	Amy L. Grant (incumbent)	7,316	100.0
Total votes		7,316	100.0

General election
Party	Candidate	Votes	%
Republican	Amy L. Grant (incumbent)	32,349	51.88
Democratic	Ken Mejia-Beal	30,005	48.12
Total votes		62,354	100.0
Republican hold			

=== District 43 ===
The 43rd district, located in the Chicago area, includes parts of Barrington Hills, Carpentersville, East Dundee, Elgin, Hoffman Estates, and South Elgin. The district had been represented by Democrat Anna Moeller since her appointment in March 2014. Moeller was re-elected with 70.61% of the vote in 2018. Moeller faced no other ballot-listed candidates in the general election.

Anna Moeller

Organizations

- Equality Illinois

Democratic primary
Party	Candidate	Votes	%
Democratic	Anna Moeller (incumbent)	6,736	100.0
Total votes		6,736	100.0

General election
Party	Candidate	Votes	%
Democratic	Anna Moeller (incumbent)	23,849	100.0
Total votes		23,849	100.0
Democratic hold			

=== District 44 ===
The 44th district, located in the Chicago area, includes all or parts of Bartlett, Elgin, Hanover Park, Hoffman Estates, Schaumburg, and Streamwood. The district had been represented by Democrat Fred Crespo since January 10, 2007. Crespo was re-elected with 65.59% of the vote in 2018. Crespo faced no other ballot-listed candidates in the general election.

Democratic primary
Party	Candidate	Votes	%
Democratic	Fred Crespo (incumbent)	9,311	100.0
Total votes		9,311	100.0

General election
Party	Candidate	Votes	%
Democratic	Fred Crespo (incumbent)	31,229	99.96
Write-in		11	0.04
Total votes		31,240	100.0
Democratic hold			

=== District 45 ===
The 45th district, located in the Chicago area, includes all or parts of Addison, Bartlett, Bloomingdale, Carol Stream, Elk Grove Village, Hanover Park, Itasca, Roselle, Streamwood, Wayne, West Chicago, and Wood Dale. The district had been represented by Democrat Diane Pappas since January 9, 2019. Pappas was elected with 50.84% of the vote in 2018. Three candidates ran for the Republican nomination: Michael Camerer, a private practice chiropractor; Alfredo "Al" Manzo, a business owner; and Wayne Township Supervisor Randy Ramey, a former member of the Illinois House from the 55th district. Michael Camerer would go on to win the Republican nomination but would die "unexpectedly from natural causes" on June 18, 2020, at the age of 61. Seth Lewis, a small business owner and Republican nominee for the 23rd Senate district in 2016 and 2018, was tapped to be the new Republican nominee.

==== Endorsements ====
Seth Lewis

Newspapers

- Chicago Sun-Times
- Chicago Tribune
- Daily Herald
Diane Pappas

Organizations

- Equality Illinois

Democratic primary
Party	Candidate	Votes	%
Democratic	Diane Pappas (incumbent)	9,173	100.0
Total votes		9,173	100.0

Republican primary
Party	Candidate	Votes	%
Republican	Michael E. Camerer	2,367	47.82
Republican	Randy Ramey	2,030	41.01
Republican	Alfredo "Al" Manzo	553	11.17
Total votes		4,950	100.0

General election
Party	Candidate	Votes	%
Republican	Seth Lewis	30,246	53.22
Democratic	Diane Pappas (incumbent)	26,590	46.78
Total votes		56,836	100.0
Republican gain from Democratic			

=== District 46 ===
The 46th district, located in the Chicago area, includes all or parts of Addison, Bloomingdale, Carol Stream, Elmhurst, Glen Ellyn, Glendale Heights, Hanover Park, Lombard, Oakbrook Terrace, Villa Park, and Wheaton. The district had been represented by Democrat Deb Conroy since January 9, 2013. Conroy was re-elected with 58.68% of the vote in 2018. Conroy faced no other ballot-listed candidates in the general election.

Deb Conroy

Organizations

- Equality Illinois

Democratic primary
Party	Candidate	Votes	%
Democratic	Deb Conroy (incumbent)	9,367	100.0
Total votes		9,367	100.0

General election
Party	Candidate	Votes	%
Democratic	Deb Conroy (incumbent)	34,949	100.0
Total votes		34,949	100.0
Democratic hold			

=== District 47 ===
The 47th district, located in the Chicago area, includes all or parts of Burr Ridge, Clarendon Hills, Darien, Downers Grove, Elmhurst, Hinsdale, Lombard, Oak Brook, Oakbrook Terrace, Villa Park, Western Springs, Westmont, and Willowbrook. The district had been represented by Republican Deanne Mazzochi since her appointment in July 2018. Mazzochi was elected with 51.53% of the vote in 2018. Jennifer Zordani, an attorney, was the Democratic nominee.

==== Endorsements ====
Jennifer Zordani

Elected officials

- Sean Casten, Congressman
- Suzy Glowiak, state senator
- Mike Quigley, Congressman

Organizations

- Chicago Federation of Labor
- Equality Illinois
- Illinois AFL–CIO
- Illinois National Organization For Women (NOW)
- Moms Demand Action
- Planned Parenthood Illinois Action
- The Sierra Club
- United Auto Workers
Deanne Mazzochi

Newspapers

- Chicago Sun-Times
- Chicago Tribune
- Daily Herald

Organizations

- Illinois Republican Party

Democratic primary
Party	Candidate	Votes	%
Democratic	Jennifer Zordani	12,516	100.0
Total votes		12,516	100.0

Republican primary
Party	Candidate	Votes	%
Republican	Deanne Marie Mazzochi (incumbent)	4,335	100.0
Total votes		4,335	100.0

General election
Party	Candidate	Votes	%
Republican	Deanne Marie Mazzochi (incumbent)	34,646	53.99
Democratic	Jennifer Zordani	29,528	46.01
Total votes		64,174	100.0
Republican hold			

=== District 48 ===
The 48th district, located in the Chicago area, includes parts of Downers Grove, Glen Ellyn, Lisle, Lombard, Oakbrook Terrace, Villa Park, and Wheaton. Howard was elected 53.5% of the vote in 2018. The district had been represented by Democrat Terra Costa Howard since January 9, 2019. Peter Breen, former representative of the district from 2015 to 2019, was the Republican nominee.

Terra Costa Howard

U.S. senators

- Tammy Duckworth, Illinois US Senator (Class III)
- Dick Durbin, Illinois US Senator (Class II)

U.S. representatives

- Sean Casten, representative from Illinois's 6th congressional district
- Bill Foster, representative from Illinois's 11th congressional district
- Raja Krishnamoorthi, representative from Illinois's 8th congressional district

Organizations

- Equality Illinois
- Illinois AFL–CIO
- Illinois NOW Pac
- Moms Demand Action
- National Organization for Women (NOW)
- Planned Parenthood of Illinois Action
- Sierra Club
- Teamsters Joint Council 25

Newspapers

- Chicago Sun-Times
- Daily Herald
Peter Breen

Newspapers

- Chicago Tribune

Democratic primary
Party	Candidate	Votes	%
Democratic	Terra Costa Howard (incumbent)	14,366	100.0
Total votes		14,366	100.0

Republican primary
Party	Candidate	Votes	%
Republican	Peter Breen	5,559	100.0
Total votes		5,559	100.0

General election
Party	Candidate	Votes	%
Democratic	Terra Costa Howard (incumbent)	33,303	53.77
Republican	Peter Breen	28,628	46.23
Total votes		61,931	100.0
Democratic hold			

=== District 49 ===
The 49th district, located in the Chicago area, includes parts of Aurora, Bartlett, Batavia, Elgin, Geneva, Naperville, North Aurora, South Elgin, St. Charles, Warrenville, Wayne, and West Chicago. The district had been represented by Democrat Karina Villa since January 9, 2019. Villa was elected with 53.81% of the vote in 2018. Villa ran for state senator in the 25th district, leaving her state representative seat open. Maura Hirschauer, a community organizer, was the Democratic nominee. North Aurora Village trustee Laura Curtis was the Republican nominee.

Laura Curtis

Newspapers

- Chicago Tribune
Maura Hirschauer

Organizations

- Equality Illinois

Democratic primary
Party	Candidate	Votes	%
Democratic	Maura Hirschauer	11,207	100.0
Total votes		11,207	100.0

Republican primary
Party	Candidate	Votes	%
Republican	Laura Curtis	5,236	100.0
Total votes		5,236	100.0

General election
Party	Candidate	Votes	%
Democratic	Maura Hirschauer	29,288	54.22
Republican	Laura Curtis	24,725	45.78
Total votes		54,013	100.0
Democratic hold			

=== District 50 ===
The 50th district, located in the Chicago area, includes all or parts of Aurora, Batavia, Big Rock, Campton Hills, Elburn, Geneva, Lily Lake, Montgomery, North Aurora, Oswego, Plano, Prestbury, St. Charles, Sugar Grove, and Yorkville. The district had been represented by Republican Keith R. Wheeler since January 14, 2015. Wheeler was re-elected with 54.99% of the vote in 2018. Kate Monteleone, a non-profit consultant and executive director, was nominated to run as the Democratic nominee.

Keith Wheeler

Newspapers

- Chicago Tribune
Kate Monteleone

Organizations

- Equality Illinois

Republican primary
Party	Candidate	Votes	%
Republican	Keith R. Wheeler (incumbent)	7,559	100.0
Total votes		7,559	100.0

General election
Party	Candidate	Votes	%
Republican	Keith R. Wheeler (incumbent)	35,817	56.42
Democratic	Kate Monteleone	27,661	43.58
Total votes		63,478	100.0
Republican hold			

== Districts 51–75 ==
=== District 51 ===
The 51st district, located in the Chicago area, includes all or parts of Arlington Heights, Barrington, Barrington Hills, Buffalo Grove, Deer Park, Forest Lake, Grayslake, Green Oaks, Gurnee, Hawthorn Woods, Kildeer, Lake Barrington, Lake Zurich, Libertyville, Long Grove, Mettawa, Mundelein, North Barrington, Tower Lakes, Vernon Hills, Wauconda, and Waukegan. The district had been represented by Democrat Mary Edly-Allen since January 9, 2019. Edly-Allen was elected with 50.36% of the vote in 2018. Ela Township Trustee Chris Bos was the Republican nominee.

Mary Edly-Allen

Organizations

- Equality Illinois

Newspapers

- Chicago Tribune
- Daily Herald

Democratic primary
Party	Candidate	Votes	%
Democratic	Mary Edly-Allen (incumbent)	13,595	100.0
Total votes		13,595	100.0

Republican primary
Party	Candidate	Votes	%
Republican	Chris Bos	5,444	100.0
Total votes		5,444	100.0

General election
Party	Candidate	Votes	%
Republican	Chris Bos	33,697	50.87
Democratic	Mary Edly-Allen (incumbent)	32,548	49.13
Total votes		66,245	100.0
Republican gain from Democratic			

=== District 52 ===
The 52nd district, located in the Chicago area, includes all or parts of Algonquin, Barrington, Barrington Hills, Carpentersville, Cary, Crystal Lake, East Dundee, Fox River Grove, Hoffman Estates, Inverness, Island Lake, Lake Barrington, Lake in the Hills, North Barrington, Oakwood Hills, Port Barrington, Prairie Grove, South Barrington, Tower Lakes, Trout Valley, and Wauconda. The district had been represented by Republican David McSweeney since January 9, 2013. McSweeney was re-elected unopposed in 2018. On September 5, 2019, McSweeney announced he would not seek re-election and would focus on either a run for Illinois Secretary of State or US Senator. Barrington Hills Village President Martin McLaughlin was the Republican nominee. Marci Suelzer, a senior manager for a major legal services provider, was tapped as the Democratic nominee. Alia Sarfraz, a paralegal, was tapped to run as the Green Party nominee.

Martin McLaughlin

Newspapers

- Chicago Tribune
Marci Suelzer

Organizations

- Equality Illinois

Republican primary
Party	Candidate	Votes	%
Republican	Martin McLaughlin	6,526	100.0
Total votes		6,526	100.0

General election
Party	Candidate	Votes	%
Republican	Martin McLaughlin	31,426	54.27
Democratic	Marci Suelzer	24,962	43.11
Green	Alia Sarfraz	1,521	2.63
Total votes		57,909	100.0
Republican hold			

=== District 53 ===
The 53rd district, located in the Chicago area, includes parts of Arlington Heights, Buffalo Grove, Des Plaines, Elk Grove Village, Mount Prospect, Prospect Heights, and Wheeling. The district had been represented by Democrat Mark L. Walker since January 9, 2019. He formerly represented the 66th district from January 14, 2009, to January 12, 2011. Walker was elected with 52.44% of the vote in 2018. He faced no other ballot-listed candidates in the general election.

Democratic primary
Party	Candidate	Votes	%
Democratic	Mark L. Walker (incumbent)	13,861	100.0
Total votes		13,861	100.0

General election
Party	Candidate	Votes	%
Democratic	Mark L. Walker (incumbent)	40,255	100.0
Total votes		40,255	100.0
Democratic hold			

=== District 54 ===
The 54th district, located in the Chicago area, includes parts of Arlington Heights, Barrington, Deer Park, Hoffman Estates, Inverness, Palatine, Rolling Meadows, Schaumburg, and South Barrington. The district had been represented by Republican Tom Morrison since January 12, 2011. Morrison was re-elected with 50.05% of the vote, or by only 43 votes, in 2018. Two candidates ran for the Democratic nomination: Ryan Huffman, a data analyst and Maggie Trevor, a principal of a market research company and Democratic candidate for the district in 2018. After each candidate won their respective nomination, Republican Tom Morrison faced Democrat Maggie Trevor in the general election.

==== Endorsements ====
Maggie Trevor

Elected officials

- Senator Tammy Duckworth (D-IL)
- Senator Dick Durbin (D-IL)
- Congresswoman Jan Schakowsky
- Mark Walker, state representative

Newspapers

- Chicago Sun-Times

Organizations

- AFSCME Council 31
- Chicago Federation of Labor
- Equality Illinois
- Illinois AFL–CIO
- Illinois National Organization for Women (NOW) PAC
- LGBTQ Victory Fund
- National Association of Social Workers Illinois chapter
- Sierra Club Illinois
Tom Morrison

Newspapers

- Chicago Tribune

==== Results ====
Democratic primary
Party	Candidate	Votes	%
Democratic	Maggie Trevor	11,273	80.53
Democratic	Ryan Huffman	2,725	19.47
Total votes		13,998	100.0

Republican primary
Party	Candidate	Votes	%
Republican	Thomas R. "Tom" Morrison (incumbent)	4,690	100.0
Total votes		4,690	100.0

General election
Party	Candidate	Votes	%
Republican	Thomas R. "Tom" Morrison (incumbent)	30,121	51.81
Democratic	Maggie Trevor	28,017	48.19
Total votes		58,138	100.0
Republican hold			

=== District 55 ===
The 55th district, located in the Chicago area, includes parts of Arlington Heights, Des Plaines, Elk Grove Village, Mount Prospect, Park Ridge, Rolling Meadows, and Schaumburg as well as parts of the Chicago neighborhood of O'Hare. The district had been represented by Democrat Marty Moylan since January 9, 2013. Moylan was re-elected with 55.63% of the vote in 2018. Democrat Marty Moylan faced Libertarian Glenn Olofson in the general election.

Democratic primary
Party	Candidate	Votes	%
Democratic	Martin J. Moylan (incumbent)	11,698	100.0
Total votes		11,698	100.0

General election
Party	Candidate	Votes	%
Democratic	Martin J. Moylan (incumbent)	31,770	72.58
Libertarian	Glenn Olofson	12,000	27.42
Total votes		43,770	100.0
Democratic hold			

=== District 56 ===
The 56th district, located in the Chicago area, includes parts of Elk Grove Village, Hanover Park, Hoffman Estates, Palatine, Rolling Meadows, Roselle, and Schaumburg. The district had been represented by Democrat Michelle Mussman since January 12, 2011. Mussman was re-elected with 58.86% of the vote in 2018. Schaumburg Township highway commissioner Scott Kegarise was recruited to run as the Republican nominee.

Michelle Mussman

Organizations

- Equality Illinois
Scott Kegarise

Newspapers

- Chicago Tribune

Democratic primary
Party	Candidate	Votes	%
Democratic	Michelle Mussman (incumbent)	11,230	100.0
Total votes		11,230	100.0

General election
Party	Candidate	Votes	%
Democratic	Michelle Mussman (incumbent)	28,821	57.59
Republican	Scott Kegarise	21,222	42.41
Total votes		50,043	100.0
Democratic hold			

=== District 57 ===
The 57th district, located in the Chicago area, includes parts of Arlington Heights, Buffalo Grove, Des Plaines, Glenview, Mount Prospect, Northbrook, Palatine, Prospect Heights, and Wheeling. The district had been represented by Democrat Jonathan Carroll since his appointment on October 4, 2017. Caroll was re-elected unopposed in 2018. Carroll faced no other ballot-listed candidates in the general election.

Jonathan Carroll

Organizations

- Equality Illinois

Democratic primary
Party	Candidate	Votes	%
Democratic	Jonathan Carroll (incumbent)	11,133	100.0
Total votes		11,133	100.0

General election
Party	Candidate	Votes	%
Democratic	Jonathan Carroll (incumbent)	32,397	100.0
Total votes		32,397	100.0
Democratic hold			

=== District 58 ===
The 58th district, located in the Chicago area, includes all or parts of Bannockburn, Deerfield, Glencoe, Highland Park, Highwood, Knollwood, Lake Bluff, Lake Forest, Lincolnshire, Mettawa, North Chicago, Northbrook, and Riverwoods. The district had been represented by Democrat Bob Morgan since January 9, 2019. Morgan was elected with 63.81% of the vote in 2018. Morgan faced no other ballot-listed candidates in the general election.

Bob Morgan

Organizations

- Equality Illinois

Democratic primary
Party	Candidate	Votes	%
Democratic	Bob Morgan (incumbent)	16,741	100.0
Total votes		16,741	100.0

General election
Party	Candidate	Votes	%
Democratic	Bob Morgan (incumbent)	43,648	100.0
Total votes		43,648	100.0
Democratic hold			

=== District 59 ===
The 59th district, located in the Chicago area, includes parts of Buffalo Grove, Green Oaks, Gurnee, Indian Creek, Knollwood, Lake Forest, Lincolnshire, Long Grove, Mettawa, Mundelein, North Chicago, Northbrook, Park City, Riverwoods, Vernon Hills, Waukegan, and Wheeling. The district had been represented by Democrat Daniel Didech since January 9, 2019. Didech was elected with 61.34% of the vote in 2018. Didech faced no other ballot-listed candidates in the general election.

Daniel Didech

Organizations

- Equality Illinois

Democratic primary
Party	Candidate	Votes	%
Democratic	Daniel Didech (incumbent)	12,096	100.0
Total votes		12,096	100.0

General election
Party	Candidate	Votes	%
Democratic	Daniel Didech (incumbent)	36,940	100.0
Total votes		36,940	100.0
Democratic hold			

=== District 60 ===
The 60th district, located in the Chicago area, includes parts of Beach Park, Gurnee, North Chicago, Park City, and Waukegan. The district had been represented by Democrat Rita Mayfield since her appointment in July 2010. Mayfield was re-elected unopposed in 2018. Mayfield faced Diana Burdette, a homeschooling educator, for the Democratic nomination. After winning the Democratic nomination, Mayfield faced no other ballot-listed candidates in the general election.

==== Endorsements ====
Rita Mayfield

Organizations

- Equality Illinois
- SEIU Healthcare

==== Results ====
Democratic primary
Party	Candidate	Votes	%
Democratic	Rita Mayfield (incumbent)	7,020	81.07
Democratic	Diana Burdette	1,639	18.93
Total votes		8,659	100.0

Republican primary
Party	Candidate	Votes	%
Republican	Mark B. Lund (write-in)	229	100.0
Total votes		229	100.0

General election
Party	Candidate	Votes	%
Democratic	Rita Mayfield (incumbent)	25,886	100.0
Total votes		25,886	100.0
Democratic hold			

=== District 61 ===
The 61st district, located in the Chicago area, includes parts of Antioch, Beach Park, Gages Lake, Grandwood Park, Gurnee, Lake Villa, Lindenhurst, Old Mill Creek, Third Lake, Wadsworth, Waukegan, Winthrop Harbor, and Zion. The district had been represented by Democrat Joyce Mason since January 9, 2019. Antioch trustee Dan Yost was the Republican nominee.

Joyce Mason

Organizations

- Equality Illinois
Dan Yost

Newspapers

- Chicago Tribune

Democratic primary
Party	Candidate	Votes	%
Democratic	Joyce Mason (incumbent)	10,009	100.0
Total votes		10,009	100.0

Republican primary
Party	Candidate	Votes	%
Republican	Dan Yost	4,424	100.0
Total votes		4,424	100.0

General election
Party	Candidate	Votes	%
Democratic	Joyce Mason (incumbent)	28,447	55.09
Republican	Dan Yost	23,189	44.91
Total votes		51,636	100.0
Democratic hold			

=== District 62 ===
The 62nd district, located in the Chicago area, includes all or parts of Gages Lake, Grayslake, Gurnee, Hainesville, Lake Villa, Long Lake, Round Lake, Round Lake Beach, Round Lake Heights, Round Lake Park, Third Lake, Venetian Village, Volo, Wauconda, and Waukegan. The district had been represented by Democrat Sam Yingling since January 9, 2013. Jim Walsh, a medical physicist, was the Republican nominee.

Sam Yingling

Organizations

- Equality Illinois
Jim Walsh

Newspapers

- Chicago Tribune

Democratic primary
Party	Candidate	Votes	%
Democratic	Sam Yingling (incumbent)	9,762	100.0
Total votes		9,762	100.0

Republican primary
Party	Candidate	Votes	%
Republican	Jim Walsh	2,992	100.0
Total votes		2,992	100.0

General election
Party	Candidate	Votes	%
Democratic	Sam Yingling (incumbent)	27,215	56.89
Republican	Jim Walsh	20,619	43.11
Total votes		47,834	100.0
Democratic hold			

=== District 63 ===
The 63rd district, located in the Chicago area, includes all or parts of Bull Valley, Chemung, Crystal Lake, Greenwood, Harvard, Hebron, Johnsburg, Lakemoor, Marengo, McCullom Lake, McHenry, Pistakee Highlands, Richmond, Ringwood, Spring Grove, Union, Wonder Lake, and Woodstock. The district had been represented by Republican Steve Reick since January 11, 2017. Two candidates ran for the Democratic nomination: Peter Janko, president of Lumenelle Lighting Design and Restoration and Brian Sager, retired college professor and administrator. After each candidate won their respective party's nomination, Republican Steve Reick faced Democrat Brian Sager in the general election.

Brian Sager

Elected officials

- US Senator Dick Durbin

Organizations

- Equality Illinois
- Illinois AFL–CIO
- National Organization for Women (NOW)
- Planned Parenthood
- Sierra Club

Newspapers

- Chicago Sun-Times
- Daily Herald
- Northwest Herald

Democratic primary
Party	Candidate	Votes	%
Democratic	Brian Sager	5,984	66.05
Democratic	Peter Janko	3,076	33.95
Total votes		9,060	100.0

Republican primary
Party	Candidate	Votes	%
Republican	Steven Reick (incumbent)	7,836	100.0
Total votes		7,836	100.0

General election
Party	Candidate	Votes	%
Republican	Steven Reick (incumbent)	28,320	54.77
Democratic	Brian Sager	23,390	45.23
Total votes		51,710	100.0
Republican hold			

=== District 64 ===
The 64th district, located in the Chicago area, includes all or parts of Antioch, Bull Valley, Channel Lake, Crystal Lake, Fox Lake, Fox Lake Hills, Holiday Hills, Island Lake, Johnsburg, Lake Catherine, Lake Villa, Lakemoor, Lakewood, Lindenhurst, Long Lake, McHenry, Prairie Grove, Round Lake Heights, Spring Grove, Venetian Village, Volo, Wauconda, Wonder Lake, and Woodstock. The district had been represented by Republican Tom Weber since January 9, 2019. Leslie Armstrong-McLeod, a small business owner, was the Democratic nominee.

==== Endorsements ====
Leslie Armstrong McLeod

Organizations

- Equality Illinois

Democratic primary
Party	Candidate	Votes	%
Democratic	Leslie Armstrong-McLeod	9,620	100.0
Total votes		9,620	100.0

Republican primary
Party	Candidate	Votes	%
Republican	Tom Weber (incumbent)	7,059	100.0
Total votes		7,059	100.0

General election
Party	Candidate	Votes	%
Republican	Tom Weber (incumbent)	35,162	59.77
Democratic	Leslie Armstrong-McLeod	23,665	40.23
Total votes		58,827	100.0
Republican hold			

=== District 65 ===
The 65th district, located in the Chicago area, includes all or parts of Batavia, Burlington, Campton Hills, Elgin, Geneva, Gilberts, Hampshire, Huntley, Pingree Grove, South Elgin, St. Charles, and Wayne. The district had been represented by Republican Dan Ugaste since January 9, 2019. Two candidates ran for the Democratic nomination: Mohammad "Mo" Iqbal, a lawyer and civil engineer and Martha Paschke, a patient intake coordinator. After each candidate won their respective nomination, Republican Dan Ugaste faced Democrat Martha Paschke in the general election.

Martha Paschke

Elected officials

- Steven Andersson, former state representative (Republican)
- Daniel Biss, former state senator
- Sean Casten, Congressman
- Cristina Castro, state senator
- Bill Foster, Congressman
- Anna Moeller, state representative
- Lauren Underwood, Congresswoman

Newspapers

- Chicago Sun-Times

Organizations

- AFSCME Council 31
- Emily's List
- Equality Illinois
- Everytown for Gun Safety
- Illinois AFL–CIO
- IUOE Local 150
- Moms Demand Action
- National Organization for Women (NOW) Illinois
- Planned Parenthood Illinois Action
- Sierra Club
- UAW Illinois State Community Action Program

Democratic primary
Party	Candidate	Votes	%
Democratic	Martha Paschke	8,297	66.11
Democratic	Mohammad "Mo" Iqbal	4,253	33.89
Total votes		12,550	100.0

Republican primary
Party	Candidate	Votes	%
Republican	Dan Ugaste (incumbent)	6,820	100.0
Total votes		6,820	100.0

General election
Party	Candidate	Votes	%
Republican	Dan Ugaste (incumbent)	35,206	51.83
Democratic	Martha Paschke	32,720	48.17
Total votes		67,926	100.0
Republican hold			

=== District 66 ===
The 66th district, located in the Chicago area, includes all or parts of Algonquin, Carpentersville, Crystal Lake, East Dundee, Elgin, Gilberts, Huntley, Lake in the Hills, Lakewood, Sleepy Hollow, and West Dundee. The district had been represented by Republican Allen Skillicorn since January 11, 2017. Skillicorn faced McHenry County Board member Carolyn Schofield for the Republican nomination. Two candidates ran for the Democratic nomination: Jim Malone, a sheet metal worker, and Suzanne Ness, a small business owner. After each candidate won their respective party's nomination, Republican Allen Skillicorn faced Democrat Suzanne Ness in the general election.

Suzanne Ness

Elected officials

- Dick Durbin, US Senator
- Anna Moeller, IL State Representative

Organizations

- AFL–CIO
- AFSCME Council 31
- Equality Illinois
- IUOE Local 150
- Planned Parenthood
- Sierra Club Illinois Chapter
- Stand for Children Pac
- Teamsters
- UFCW

Newspapers

- Chicago Sun-Times
- Daily Herald

Democratic primary
Party	Candidate	Votes	%
Democratic	Suzanne M. Ness	7,606	77.63
Democratic	Jim Malone	2,192	22.37
Total votes		9,798	100.0

Republican primary
Party	Candidate	Votes	%
Republican	Allen Skillicorn (incumbent)	3,971	69.74
Republican	Carolyn Schofield	1,723	30.26
Total votes		5,694	100.0

General election
Party	Candidate	Votes	%
Democratic	Suzanne M Ness	29,966	51.97
Republican	Allen Skillicorn (incumbent)	27,698	48.03
Total votes		57,664	100.0
Democratic gain from Republican			

=== District 67 ===
The 67th district covers a large part of Rockford. The district had been represented by Democrat Maurice West since January 9, 2019. Kathleen "Kathie" Jo Hansen ran as the Republican nominee.

Maurice West

Organizations

- Equality Illinois

Democratic primary
Party	Candidate	Votes	%
Democratic	Maurice A. West II (incumbent)	6,750	100.0
Total votes		6,750	100.0

General election
Party	Candidate	Votes	%
Democratic	Maurice A. West II (incumbent)	19,742	66.53
Republican	Kathleen (Kathie) Jo Hansen	9,932	33.47
Total votes		29,674	100.0
Democratic hold			

=== District 68 ===
The 68th district covers parts of Cherry Valley, Loves Park, Machesney Park, Rockford, and Roscoe. The district had been represented by Republican John Cabello since his appointment in August 2012. Dave Vella, an attorney, was the Democratic nominee.

Dave Vella

Organizations

- Equality Illinois

Democratic primary
Party	Candidate	Votes	%
Democratic	Dave Vella	9,833	100.0
Total votes		9,833	100.0

Republican primary
Party	Candidate	Votes	%
Republican	John M. Cabello (incumbent)	7,248	100.0
Total votes		7,428	100.0

General election
Party	Candidate	Votes	%
Democratic	Dave Vella	26,770	50.22
Republican	John M. Cabello (incumbent)	26,531	49.78
Total votes		53,301	100.0
Democratic gain from Republican			

=== District 69 ===
The 69th district covers all or parts of Belvidere, Caledonia, Capron, Cherry Valley, Loves Park, New Milford, Poplar Grove, Rockford, Rockton, Roscoe, South Beloit, and Timberlane. The district had been represented by Republican Joe Sosnowski since January 12, 2011. Sosnowski faced no other ballot-listed candidates in the general election.

Republican primary
Party	Candidate	Votes	%
Republican	Joe Sosnowski (incumbent)	7,506	100.0
Total votes		7,506	100.0

General election
Party	Candidate	Votes	%
Republican	Joe Sosnowski (incumbent)	45,218	100.0
Total votes		45,218	100.0
Republican hold			

=== District 70 ===
The 70th district, located partly in the Chicago area, includes Belvidere, Big Rock, Burlington, Campton Hills, Cortland, DeKalb, Elgin, Garden Prairie, Genoa, Hampshire, Hinckley, Kaneville, Kingston, Kirkland, Lily Lake, Malta, Maple Park, Poplar Grove, Sugar Grove, Sycamore, and Virgil. The district had been represented by Republican Jeff Keicher since his appointment on July 2, 2018. Paul Stoddard, a retired associate professor of geology at Northern Illinois University and candidate for the district in 2018, was the Democratic nominee.

==== Endorsements ====
Paul Stoddard

Organizations

- Equality Illinois

Democratic primary
Party	Candidate	Votes	%
Democratic	Paul Stoddard	9,358	100.0
Total votes		9,358	100.0

Republican primary
Party	Candidate	Votes	%
Republican	Jeff Keicher (incumbent)	5,518	100.0
Total votes		5,518	100.0

General election
Party	Candidate	Votes	%
Republican	Jeff Keicher (incumbent)	29,713	57.67
Democratic	Paul Stoddard	21,810	42.33
Total votes		51,523	100.0
Republican hold			

=== District 71 ===
The 71st district, located partly in the Quad Cities area, covers all or parts of Albany, Carbon Cliff, Cleveland, Coal Valley, Colona, Como, Cordova, Deer Grove, East Moline, Erie, Fulton, Hampton, Hillsdale, Lyndon, Moline, Morrison, Port Byron, Prophetstown, Rapids City, Rock Falls, Savanna, Silvis, Sterling, Tampico, and Thomson. The district had been represented by Republican Tony McCombie since January 11, 2017. Joan Padilla, the executive director at Hope of Hope Cancer Wellness Center in Dixon and candidate in the 2018 election, was the Democratic nominee.

Joan Padilla

Organizations

- Equality Illinois

Democratic primary
Party	Candidate	Votes	%
Democratic	Joan Padilla	8,044	100.0
Total votes		8,044	100.0

Republican primary
Party	Candidate	Votes	%
Republican	Tony M. McCombie (incumbent)	4,637	100.0
Total votes		4,637	100.0

General election
Party	Candidate	Votes	%
Republican	Tony M. McCombie (incumbent)	32,132	61.60
Democratic	Joan Padilla	20,031	38.40
Total votes		52,163	100.0
Republican hold			

=== District 72 ===
The 72nd district, located in the Quad Cities area, covers all or parts of Andalusia, Coyne Center, Milan, Moline, Oak Grove, Reynolds, Rock Island, and Rock Island Arsenal. The district had been represented by Democrat Michael Halpin since January 10, 2017. Glen Evans Sr., a perennial candidate, ran for the Republican nomination.

Mike Halpin

Organizations

- Equality Illinois

Democratic primary
Party	Candidate	Votes	%
Democratic	Michael W. Halpin (incumbent)	10,245	100.0
Total votes		10,245	100.0

Republican primary
Party	Candidate	Votes	%
Republican	Glen Evans Sr.	2,771	100.0
Total votes		2,771	100.0

General election
Party	Candidate	Votes	%
Democratic	Michael W. Halpin (incumbent)	27,413	59.74
Republican	Glen Evans Sr.	18,471	40.26
Total votes		45,884	100.0
Democratic hold			

=== District 73 ===
The 73rd district, located in the Peoria metropolitan area, covers all or parts of Bay View Gardens, Bradford, Brimfield, Buda, Chillicothe, Dana, Dunlap, Elmwood, Germantown Hills, Henry, Hopewell, La Fayette, La Rose, Lacon, Leonore, Lostant, Metamora, Neponset, Peoria, Peoria Heights, Princeville, Roanoke, Rome, Rutland, Sparland, Spring Bay, Tiskilwa, Toluca, Toulon, Varna, Washburn, Wenona, Wyanet, and Wyoming. The district had been represented by Republican Ryan Spain since January 11, 2017. Spain faced no other ballot-listed candidates in the general election.

Republican primary
Party	Candidate	Votes	%
Republican	Ryan Spain (incumbent)	6,505	100.0
Total votes		6,505	100.0

General election
Party	Candidate	Votes	%
Republican	Ryan Spain (incumbent)	50,610	100.0
Total votes		50,610	100.0
Republican hold			

=== District 74 ===
The 74th district covers all or parts of Aledo, Alexis, Alpha, Altona, Amboy, Andover, Annawan, Atkinson, Bishop Hill, Buda, Cambridge, Dover, East Galesburg, Galesburg, Galva, Geneseo, Gilson, Harmon, Henderson, Hooppole, Joy, Keithsburg, Kewanee, Knoxville, La Moille, London Mills, Manlius, Maquon, Matherville, Mineral, New Bedford, New Boston, North Henderson, Oak Run, Ohio, Oneida, Orion, Rio, Seaton, Sheffield, Sherrard, Sublette, Victoria, Viola, Walnut, Wataga, Williamsfield, Windsor, Woodhull, and Yates City. The district had been represented by Republican Daniel Swanson since January 11, 2017. Christopher Demink was the Democratic nominee.

Democratic primary
Party	Candidate	Votes	%
Democratic	Christopher Demink	7,187	100.0
Total votes		7,187	100.0

Republican primary
Party	Candidate	Votes	%
Republican	Dan Swanson (incumbent)	6,921	100.0
Total votes		6,921	100.0

General election
Party	Candidate	Votes	%
Republican	Dan Swanson (incumbent)	39,239	70.97
Democratic	Christopher Demink	16,054	29.03
Total votes		55,293	100.0
Republican hold			

=== District 75 ===
The 75th district, located in parts of the Chicago area, includes all or parts of Braceville, Braidwood, Carbon Hill, Channahon, Coal City, Diamond, Dwight, Godley, Joliet, Kinsman, Lake Holiday, Lakewood Shores, Lisbon, Marseilles, Mazon, Millbrook, Millington, Minooka, Morris, Newark, Oswego, Plano, Plattville, Ransom, Sandwich, Seneca, Sheridan, Verona, Wilmington, and Yorkville. The district had been represented by Republican David Welter since his appointment in July 2016. Welter faced no other ballot-listed candidates in the general election.

Republican primary
Party	Candidate	Votes	%
Republican	David Allen Welter (incumbent)	6,689	100.0
Total votes		6,689	100.0

General election
Party	Candidate	Votes	%
Republican	David Allen Welter (incumbent)	48,157	100.0
Write-in		1	0.00
Total votes		48,158	100.0
Republican hold			

== Districts 76–100 ==
=== District 76 ===
The 76th district covers all or parts of Arlington, Bureau Junction, Cedar Point, Cherry, Dalzell, Dayton, De Pue, Dover, Grand Ridge, Granville, Hennepin, Hollowayville, Kangley, LaSalle, Ladd, Magnolia, Malden, Mark, Marseilles, McNabb, Naplate, North Utica, Oglesby, Ottawa, Peru, Seatonville, Spring Valley, Standard, Streator, Tonica, and Troy Grove. The district had been represented by Democrat Lance Yednock since January 9, 2019. Travis Breeden, a feeder driver with UPS, was the Republican nominee.

Democratic primary
Party	Candidate	Votes	%
Democratic	Lance Yednock (incumbent)	9,153	100.0
Total votes		9,153	100.0

Republican primary
Party	Candidate	Votes	%
Republican	Travis S. Breeden	4,120	100.0
Total votes		4,120	100.0

General election
Party	Candidate	Votes	%
Democratic	Lance Yednock (incumbent)	27,289	54.36
Republican	Travis S. Breeden	22,911	45.64
Total votes		50,200	100.0
Democratic hold			

=== District 77 ===
The 77th district, located in the Chicago area, includes all or parts of Addison, Bellwood, Bensenville, Berkeley, Des Plaines, Elk Grove Village, Elmhurst, Franklink Park, Maywood, Melrose Park, Northlake, Rosemont, Stone Park, Villa Park, and Wood Dale as well parts of the Chicago neighborhood of O'Hare. The district had been represented by Democrat Kathleen Willis since January 9, 2013. Anthony Airdo, a sales director and candidate for the district in 2018, was the Republican nominee.

Kathleen Willis

Organizations

- Equality Illinois

Democratic primary
Party	Candidate	Votes	%
Democratic	Kathleen Willis (incumbent)	6,938	100.0
Total votes		6,938	100.0

Republican primary
Party	Candidate	Votes	%
Republican	Anthony Airdo	1,575	100.0
Total votes		1,575	100.0

General election
Party	Candidate	Votes	%
Democratic	Kathleen Willis (incumbent)	21,772	67.19
Republican	Anthony Airdo	10,631	32.81
Total votes		32,403	100.0
Democratic hold			

=== District 78 ===
The 78th district, located in the Chicago area, includes parts of Elmwood Park, Franklin Park, Melrose Park, Oak Park, and River Grove and includes parts of the Chicago neighborhood of Austin. The district had been represented by Democrat Camille Lilly since her appointment in April 2010. Lilly faced Libertarian Joshua Flynn, an insurance consultant, in the general election.

Joshua Flynn

Newspapers

- Chicago Tribune

Democratic primary
Party	Candidate	Votes	%
Democratic	Camille Lilly (incumbent)	20,529	100.0
Total votes		20,529	100.0

General election
Party	Candidate	Votes	%
Democratic	Camille Lilly (incumbent)	42,788	83.33
Libertarian	Joshua Flynn	8,559	16.67
Total votes		51,347	100.0
Democratic hold			

=== District 79 ===
The 79th district, located mostly in the Chicago area, includes all or parts of Aroma Park, Beecher, Bonfield, Bourbonnais, Braceville, Bradley, Buckingham, Cabery, Chebanse, Coal City, Diamond, East Brooklyn, Essex, Gardner, Godley, Herscher, Hopkins Park, Irwin, Kankakee, Limestone, Momence, Peotone, Reddick, Sammons Point, South Wilmington, St. Anne, Sun River Terrace, and Union Hill. The district had been represented by Republican Lindsay Parkhurst since January 11, 2017. Parkhurst announced on November 13, 2019, that she would not be seeking another term and would instead be running for a judicial post. Kankakee County Board member Jackie Haas was the Republican nominee. Two candidates ran for the Democratic nomination: Charlene Eads, a union steward with AFSCME Local 29 and Kankakee County Board member Robert Ellington-Snipes. Democrat Charlene Eads faced Republican Jackie Haas in the general election.

==== Endorsements ====
Charlene Eads

Organizations

- Equality Illinois

Democratic primary
Party	Candidate	Votes	%
Democratic	Charlene Eads	4,394	56.09
Democratic	Robert S. Ellington-Snipes	3,440	43.91
Total votes		7,834	100.0

Republican primary
Party	Candidate	Votes	%
Republican	Jackie Haas	6,741	100.0
Total votes		6,741	100.0

General election
Party	Candidate	Votes	%
Republican	Jackie Haas	29,540	63.77
Democratic	Charlene Eads	16,780	36.23
Total votes		46,320	100.0
Republican hold			

=== District 80 ===
The 80th district, located in the Chicago area, includes all or parts of Chicago Heights, Flossmoor, Frankfort, Glenwood, Hazel Crest, Homewood, Joliet, Manhattan, Matteson, Mokena, Monee, New Lenox, Olympia Fields, Park Forest, Richton Park, South Chicago Heights, Steger, Symerton, University Park, and Wilmington. The district had been represented by Democrat Anthony DeLuca since his appointment in March 2009. DeLuca faced Libertarian Clayton Cleveland, an asset and acquisition manager at a real estate company, in the general election.

Democratic primary
Party	Candidate	Votes	%
Democratic	Anthony DeLuca (incumbent)	14,256	100.0
Total votes		14,256	100.0

General election
Party	Candidate	Votes	%
Democratic	Anthony DeLuca (incumbent)	39,293	79.81
Libertarian	Clayton D. Cleveland	9,940	20.19
Total votes		49,233	100.0
Democratic hold			

=== District 81 ===
The 81st district, located in the Chicago area, includes parts of Bolingbrook, Darien, Downers Grove, Lisle, Naperville, Westmont, and Woodridge. The district had been represented by Democrat Anne Stava-Murray since January 9, 2019. Former Downers Grove Township clerk Laura Hois was the Republican nominee.

==== Endorsements ====
Anne Stava-Murray

Organizations

- Equality Illinois
Laura Hois

Organizations

- Daily Herald

Democratic primary
Party	Candidate	Votes	%
Democratic	Anne Stava-Murray (incumbent)	13,755	100.0
Total votes		13,755	100.0

Republican primary
Party	Candidate	Votes	%
Republican	Laura Hois	4,757	100.0
Total votes		4,757	100.0

General election
Party	Candidate	Votes	%
Democratic	Anne Stava-Murray (incumbent)	33,340	52.61
Republican	Laura Hois	30,035	47.39
Total votes		63,375	100.0
Democratic hold			

=== District 82 ===
The 82nd district, located in the Chicago area, covers parts of Burr Ridge, Countryside, Darien, Hinsdale, Homer Glen, Indian Head Park, La Grange, Lemont, Lockport, Palos Park, Western Springs, Willow Springs, Willowbrook, and Woodridge. The district had been represented by Republican Leader Jim Durkin since his January 2006 appointment. Kassem Moukahal, an entrepreneur, was the Democratic nominee.

Democratic primary
Party	Candidate	Votes	%
Democratic	Kassem Moukahal	12,038	100.0
Total votes		12,038	100.0

Republican primary
Party	Candidate	Votes	%
Republican	Jim Durkin (incumbent)	5,104	100.0
Total votes		5,104	100.0

General election
Party	Candidate	Votes	%
Republican	Jim Durkin (incumbent)	41,925	65.79
Democratic	Kassem Moukahal	21,805	34.21
Total votes		63,730	100.0
Republican hold			

=== District 83 ===
The 83rd district, located in the Chicago area, includes parts of Aurora, Montgomery, and North Aurora. The district had been represented by Democrat Linda Chapa LaVia since January 8, 2003. She would vacate her seat in February 2019 after being nominated by Governor J. B. Pritzker to serve as director of the Illinois Department of Veterans' Affairs. Democrat Barbara Hernandez was appointed on March 7, 2019, to fill the vacancy. Hernandez faced Juan Thomas, a lawyer and ordained minister, for the Democratic nomination. Democrat Barbara Hernandez faced Republican Don Walter, an election judge, in the general election.

==== Endorsements ====
Barbara Hernandez

Organizations

- Equality Illinois
- National Association of Social Workers Illinois chapter
- SEIU Healthcare

==== Results ====
Democratic primary
Party	Candidate	Votes	%
Democratic	Barbara Hernandez (incumbent)	5,340	72.23
Democratic	Juan Thomas	2,053	27.77
Total votes		7,393	100.0

Republican primary
Party	Candidate	Votes	%
Republican	Donald R Walter	1,443	100.0
Total votes		1,443	100.0

General election
Party	Candidate	Votes	%
Democratic	Barbara Hernandez (incumbent)	19,300	71.73
Republican	Donald R Walter	7,607	28.27
Total votes		26,907	100.0
Democratic hold			

=== District 84 ===
The 84th district, located in the Chicago area, covers parts of Aurora, Boulder Hill, Montgomery, Naperville, and Oswego. The district had been represented by Democrat Stephanie Kifowit since January 9, 2013. Kifowit faced no other ballot-listed candidates in the general election.

Stephanie Kifowit

Organizations

- Equality Illinois

Democratic primary
Party	Candidate	Votes	%
Democratic	Stephanie A. Kifowit (incumbent)	10,744	100.0
Total votes		10,744	100.0

General election
Party	Candidate	Votes	%
Democratic	Stephanie A. Kifowit (incumbent)	37,152	100.0
Total votes		37,152	100.0
Democratic hold			

=== District 85 ===
The 85th district, located in the Chicago area, covers parts of Bolingbrook, Crest Hill, Fairmont, Lemont, Lockport, Naperville, Romeoville, and Woodridge. The district had been represented by Democrat John Connor since his appointment on June 24, 2017. Connor announced on September 24, 2019, that he would seek retiring state senator Pat McGuire's seat in the 43rd district, leaving his own state representative seat open. Dagmara "Dee" Avelar, a community activist, was the Democratic nominee. Ron Doweidt, the Republican precinct committeeperson for DuPage 020 Precinct, was the Republican nominee. Anna Schiefelbein was the Green Party nominee.

==== Endorsements ====
Dagmara "Dee" Avelar

U.S. senators

- Dick Durbin, U.S. senator from Illinois (Class II)

Organizations

- Equality Illinois

Democratic primary
Party	Candidate	Votes	%
Democratic	Dagmara "Dee" Avelar	10,658	100.0
Total votes		10,658	100.0

Republican primary
Party	Candidate	Votes	%
Republican	Ron Doweidt	3,001	100.0
Total votes		3,001	100.0

General election
Party	Candidate	Votes	%
Democratic	Dagmara "Dee" Avelar	26,560	59.00
Republican	Ron Doweidt	16,129	35.83
Green	Anna Schiefelbein	2,326	5.17
Total votes		45,015	100.0
Democratic hold			

=== District 86 ===
The 86th district, located in the Chicago area, covers all or parts of Channahon, Crest Hill, Elmwood, Ingalls Park, Joliet, New Lenox, Preston Heights, Rockdale, and Shorewood. The district had been represented by Democrat Larry Walsh Jr. since his appointment in April 2012. Walsh Jr. faced no other ballot-listed candidates in the general election.

Democratic primary
Party	Candidate	Votes	%
Democratic	Lawrence "Larry" Walsh Jr. (incumbent)	10,392	100.0
Total votes		10,392	100.0

General election
Party	Candidate	Votes	%
Democratic	Lawrence "Larry" Walsh Jr. (incumbent)	34,066	100.0
Total votes		34,066	100.0
Democratic hold			

=== District 87 ===
The 87th district, located within the Springfield metropolitan area, includes all or parts of Armington, Athens, Atlanta, Beason, Broadwell, Buffalo, Cantrall, Chestnut, Clear Lake, Cornland, Dawson, Delavan, Elkhart, Emden, Grandview, Green Valley, Greenview, Hartsburg, Hopedale, Illiopolis, Lake Petersburg, Latham, Lincoln, Mechanicsburg, Middletown, Minier, Morton, Mount Pulaski, New Holland, Oakford, Pekin, Petersburg, Riverton, Rochester, San Jose, Sherman, Spaulding, Springfield, Tallula, Tremon, and Williamsville. The district had been represented by Republican Tim Butler since his appointment in March 2015. Angel "Gello" Sides, a Democratic candidate in the 2018 Illinois 13th congressional district primary, was the Green Party nominee.

Republican primary
Party	Candidate	Votes	%
Republican	Tim Butler (incumbent)	9,032	100.0
Total votes		9,032	100.0

General election
Party	Candidate	Votes	%
Republican	Tim Butler (incumbent)	41,837	84.51
Green	Angel "Gello" Sides	7,666	15.49
Total votes		49,503	100.0
Republican hold			

=== District 88 ===
The 88th district, located in parts of the Peoria metropolitan area and Bloomington–Normal area, covers all or parts of Bloomington, Danvers, Deer Creek, East Peoria, Goodfield, Heritage Lake, Mackinaw, McLean, Morton, Normal, Pekin, Stanford, Twin Grove, and Washington. The district had been represented by Republican Keith P. Sommer since January 13, 1999. Karla Bailey-Smith, owner of Artistic Answers (a painting business), was the Democratic nominee. Kenneth Allison, an accountant, was the Libertarian nominee.

Karla Bailey-Smith

Organizations

- Equality Illinois

Democratic primary
Party	Candidate	Votes	%
Democratic	Karla Bailey-Smith	8,827	100.0
Total votes		8,827	100.0

Republican primary
Party	Candidate	Votes	%
Republican	Keith P. Sommer (incumbent)	6,970	100.0
Total votes		6,970	100.0

General election
Party	Candidate	Votes	%
Republican	Keith P. Sommer (incumbent)	34,331	60.10
Democratic	Karla Bailey-Smith	20,245	35.44
Libertarian	Kenneth Allison	2,549	4.46
Total votes		57,125	100.0
Republican hold			

=== District 89 ===
The 89th district covers all or parts of Adeline, Apple Canyon Lake, Apple River, Cedarville, Chadwick, Coleta, Dakota, Davis, Durand, East Dubuque, Elizabeth, Forreston, Freeport, Galena, The Galena Territory, German Valley, Hanover, Lake Summerset, Lanark, Leaf River, Lena, Menominee, Milledgeville, Mount Carroll, Mount Morris, Nora, Orangeville, Pearl City, Pecatonica, Ridott, Rock City, Rockford, Scales Mound, Shannon, Stockton, Warren, Winnebago, and Winslow. The district had been represented by Republican Andrew Chesney since December 5, 2018. John Cook was an independent candidate who ran in the general election.

Republican primary
Party	Candidate	Votes	%
Republican	Andrew S. Chesney (incumbent)	8,315	100.0
Total votes		8,315	100.0

General election
Party	Candidate	Votes	%
Republican	Andrew S. Chesney (incumbent)	38,341	73.44
Independent	John Cook	13,864	26.56
Total votes		52,205	100.0
Republican hold			

=== District 90 ===
The 90th district covers all or parts of Amboy, Ashton, Byron, Compton, Creston, Davis Junction, DeKalb, Dixon, Earlville, Franklin Grove, Grand Detour, Hillcrest, Lake Holiday, Lee, Leland, Lost Nation, Malta, Mendota, Monroe Center, Nelson, Oregon, Paw Paw, Polo, Rochelle, Sandwich, Shabbona, Somonauk, Steward, Stillman Valley, Sublette, Waterman, and West Brooklyn. The district had been represented by Republican Tom Demmer since January 9, 2013. Seth Wiggins, a technical sergeant, was the Democratic nominee.

Seth Wiggins

Organizations

- Equality Illinois

Democratic primary
Party	Candidate	Votes	%
Democratic	Seth Wiggins	7,055	100.0
Total votes		7,055	100.0

Republican primary
Party	Candidate	Votes	%
Republican	Tom Demmer (incumbent)	8,138	100.0
Total votes		8,138	100.0

General election
Party	Candidate	Votes	%
Republican	Tom Demmer (incumbent)	34,129	67.29
Democratic	Seth Wiggins	16,589	32.71
Total votes		50,718	100.0
Republican hold			

=== District 91 ===
The 91st district, located in the Peoria metropolitan area, includes all or parts of Banner, Bartonville, Bryant, Canton, Creve Coeur, Cuba, Dunfermline, East Peoria, Fairview, Farmington, Glasford, Hanna City, Kingston Mines, Lake Camelot, Lewistown, Liverpool, Mapleton, Marquette Heights, Morton, Norris, North Pekin, Norwood, Pekin, South Pekin, and St. David. The district had been represented by Republican Mike Unes since January 12, 2011. Unes announced on October 24, 2019, that he would not seek re-election. What was previously a contested three-way primary for the Republican nomination ended up only having one candidate, Pekin Mayor Mark Luft. Both Sam Goddard and Corey Campbell were removed from the Republican primary ballot by the Illinois State Board of Elections "for having insufficient signatures on their nominating petitions." Josh Grys, a former teacher, was the Democratic nominee.

Josh Grys

Organizations

- Equality Illinois

Democratic primary
Party	Candidate	Votes	%
Democratic	Josh Grys	7,620	100.0
Total votes		7,620	100.0

Republican primary
Party	Candidate	Votes	%
Republican	Mark A. Luft	4,530	100.0
Total votes		4,530	100.0

General election
Party	Candidate	Votes	%
Republican	Mark A. Luft	29,888	63.20
Democratic	Josh Grys	17,403	36.80
Total votes		47,291	100.0
Republican hold			

=== District 92 ===
The 92nd district, located at the heart of the Peoria metropolitan area, covers all or parts of Bartonville, Bellevue, Peoria, Peoria Heights, and West Peoria. The district had been represented by Democrat Jehan Gordon-Booth since January 14, 2009. Chad Grimm was the Libertarian candidate in the general election.

Democratic primary
Party	Candidate	Votes	%
Democratic	Jehan Gordon-Booth (incumbent)	10,123	100.0
Total votes		10,123	100.0

General election
Party	Candidate	Votes	%
Democratic	Jehan Gordon-Booth (incumbent)	28,912	74.51
Libertarian	Chad Grimm	9,890	25.49
Total votes		38,802	100.0
Democratic hold			

=== District 93 ===
The 93rd district represents all or parts of Abingdon, Adair, Alexis, Arenzville, Ashland, Astoria, Avon, Bardolph, Bath, Beardstown, Blandinsville, Browning, Bushnell, Camden, Chandlerville, Colchester, Easton, Ellisville, Forest City, Galesburg, Georgetown, Good Hope, Goofy Ridge, Havana, Industry, Ipava, Kilbourne, Littleton, London Mills, Macomb, Manito, Marietta, Mason City, Mound Station, Mount Sterling, Plymouth, Prairie City, Ripley, Rushville, San Jose, Sciota, Smithfield, St. Augustine, Table Grove, Tennessee, Topeka, Vermont, Versailles, and Virginia. The district had been represented by Republican Norine Hammond since her appointment in December 2010. Two candidates ran for the Democratic nomination: Scott Stoll, chief operating officer at Moreland and Devitt Pharmacy and Emiliano Vera, a worker at an elementary school. Republican Norine Hammond faced Democrat Scott Stoll in the general election.

Emiliano Vera

Organizations

- Equality Illinois
Scott Stoll

Organizations

- AFL–CIO
- Democratic Party of Illinois
- Equality Illinois
- LIUNA
- Planned Parenthood
- Tri-City Building & Construction Trades Council

Democratic primary
Party	Candidate	Votes	%
Democratic	Scott Stoll	4,185	65.39
Democratic	Emiliano Vera	2,215	34.61
Total votes		6,400	100.0

Republican primary
Party	Candidate	Votes	%
Republican	Norine K. Hammond (incumbent)	6,141	100.0
Total votes		6,141	100.0

General election
Party	Candidate	Votes	%
Republican	Norine K. Hammond (incumbent)	27,892	65.89
Democratic	Scott Stoll	14,437	34.11
Total votes		42,329	100.0
Republican hold			

=== District 94 ===
The 94th district represents all or parts of Augusta, Basco, Bentley, Biggsville, Bowen, Camp Point, Carthage, Clayton, Coatsburg, Columbus, Dallas City, Elvaston, Ferris, Gladstone, Golden, Gulf Port, Hamilton, Kirkwood, La Harpe, La Prairie, Liberty, Lima, Little York, Lomax, Loraine, Media, Mendon, Monmouth, Nauvoo, Oquawka, Payson, Plainville, Plymouth, Pontoosuc, Quincy, Raritan, Roseville, Stronghurst, Ursa, Warsaw, and West Point. The district had been represented by Republican Randy Frese since January 14, 2015. Angel Smith, a Navy veteran, was the Democratic nominee.

==== Endorsements ====
Angel Smith

Organizations

- Equality Illinois

Democratic primary
Party	Candidate	Votes	%
Democratic	Angel Smith	5,577	100.0
Total votes		5,577	100.0

Republican primary
Party	Candidate	Votes	%
Republican	Randy E. Frese (incumbent)	13,277	100.0
Total votes		13,277	100.0

General election
Party	Candidate	Votes	%
Republican	Randy E. Frese (incumbent)	39,921	76.31
Democratic	Angel Smith	12,392	23.69
Total votes		52,313	100.0
Republican hold			

=== District 95 ===
The 95th district includes all or parts of Assumption, Benld, Brighton, Bunker Hill, Butler, Carlinville, Coalton, Coffeen, Donnellson, Dorchester, Eagarville, East Gillespie, Farmersville, Fillmore, Gillespie, Girard, Harvel, Hillsboro, Holiday Shores, Irving, Lake Ka-Ho, Litchfield, Livingston, Medora, Morrisonville, Mount Clare, Mount Olive, Moweaqua, New Douglas, Nilwood, Nokomis, Ohlman, Owaneco, Palmer, Pana, Panama, Raymond, Royal Lakes, Sawyerville, Schram City, Shipman, Standard City, Staunton, Stonington, Taylor Springs, Taylorville, Virden, Waggoner, Walshville, Wenonah, White City, Williamson, Witt, and Worden. The district had been represented by Republican Avery Bourne since her appointment in February 2015. Bourne faced Lawrence Oliver, the director of field services for PDC Laboratories in Florissant, Missouri, for the Republican nomination. Bourne won the nomination. Chase Wilhelm, a member of the United States Army Reserve, was the Democratic nominee.

==== Endorsements ====
Chase Wilhelm

Organizations

- Equality Illinois

Democratic primary
Party	Candidate	Votes	%
Democratic	Chase Wilhelm	6,349	100.0
Total votes		6,349	100.0

Republican primary
Party	Candidate	Votes	%
Republican	Avery Bourne (incumbent)	6,965	85.50
Republican	Lawrence L. Oliver	1,181	14.50
Total votes		8,146	100.0

General election
Party	Candidate	Votes	%
Republican	Avery Bourne (incumbent)	36,245	70.08
Democratic	Chase Wilhelm	15,475	29.92
Total votes		51,720	100.0
Republican hold			

=== District 96 ===
The 96th district, located in the Springfield metropolitan area, includes all or parts of Blue Mound, Boody, Bulpitt, Decatur, Edinburg, Harristown, Jeisyville, Kincaid, Mount Auburn, Niantic, Rochester, Springfield, Stonington, Taylorville, and Tovey. The district had been represented by Democrat Sue Scherer since January 9, 2013. Charlie McGorray, a former fire captain, was selected as the Republican nominee. John Keating, a community organizer and activist, ran as the Green Party nominee.

Democratic primary
Party	Candidate	Votes	%
Democratic	Sue Scherer (incumbent)	6,762	100.0
Total votes		6,762	100.0

Republican primary
Party	Candidate	Votes	%
Republican	Gary Pierce (write-in)	27	100.0
Total votes		27	100.0

General election
Party	Candidate	Votes	%
Democratic	Sue Scherer (incumbent)	20,742	51.52
Republican	Charles McGorray	17,865	44.37
Green	John Keating	1,657	4.12
Total votes		40,264	100.0
Democratic hold			

=== District 97 ===
The 97th district, located in the Chicago area, includes parts of Aurora, Bolingbrook, Boulder Hill, Channahon, Joliet, Montgomery, Naperville, Oswego, Plainfield, Romeoville, and Shorewood. The district had been represented by Republican Mark Batinick since January 14, 2015. Harry Benton, a union iron worker, was the Democratic nominee.

Democratic primary
Party	Candidate	Votes	%
Democratic	Harry Benton	11,768	100.0
Total votes		11,768	100.0

Republican primary
Party	Candidate	Votes	%
Republican	Mark Batinick (incumbent)	6,418	100.0
Total votes		6,418	100.0

General election
Party	Candidate	Votes	%
Republican	Mark Batinick (incumbent)	32,224	52.03
Democratic	Harry Benton	29,709	47.97
Total votes		61,933	100.0
Republican hold			

=== District 98 ===
The 98th district, located in the Chicago area, includes all or parts of Bolingbrook, Crest Hill, Crystal Lawns, Joliet, Romeoville, and Shorewood. The district had been represented by Democrat Natalie Manley since January 9, 2013. Manley faced no other ballot-listed candidates in the general election.

Democratic primary
Party	Candidate	Votes	%
Democratic	Natalie A. Manley (incumbent)	12,895	100.0
Total votes		12,895	100.0

General election
Party	Candidate	Votes	%
Democratic	Natalie A. Manley (incumbent)	43,544	100.0
Total votes		43,544	100.0
Democratic hold			

=== District 99 ===
The 99th district, located in the Springfield metropolitan area, covers all or parts of Auburn, Berlin, Chatham, Curran, Divernon, Jerome, Leland Grove, Loami, New Berlin, Pawnee, Pleasant Plains, Southern View, Springfield, Thayer, and Virden. The district had been represented by Republican Mike Murphy since January 9, 2019. Murphy faced no other ballot-listed candidates in the general election.

Republican primary
Party	Candidate	Votes	%
Republican	Mike Murphy (incumbent)	6,217	100.0
Total votes		6,217	100.0

General election
Party	Candidate	Votes	%
Republican	Mike Murphy (incumbent)	51,003	100.0
Total votes		51,003	100.0
Republican hold			

=== District 100 ===
The 100th district, located in parts of the Metro East, covers all or parts of Alsey, Batchtown, Baylis, Bluffs, Brighton, Brussels, Carrollton, Chapin, Chesterfield, Concord, Detroit, El Dara, Eldred, Exeter, Fidelity, Fieldon, Florence, Franklin, Glasgow, Godfrey, Grafton, Greenfield, Griggsville, Hamburg, Hardin, Hettick, Hillview, Hull, Jacksonville, Jerseyville, Kampsville, Kane, Kinderhook, Lynnville, Manchester, Meredosia, Milton, Modesto, Murrayville, Naples, Nebo, New Canton, New Salem, Otterville, Palmyra, Peal, Perry, Pittsfield, Pleasant Hill, Rockbridge, Roodhouse, Scottville, South Jacksonville, Time, Valley City, Waverly, White Hall, Wilmington, Winchester, and Woodson. The district had been represented by Republican C. D. Davidsmeyer since his appointment in December 2012. Jacksonville alderman Brandon Adams was selected as the Democratic nominee in the general election. Ralph Sides ran as a candidate in the general election under his newly formed Pro-Gun Pro-Life Party.

==== Endorsements ====
Brandon Adams

Organizations

- Equality Illinois

Republican primary
Party	Candidate	Votes	%
Republican	Christopher "C.D." Davidsmeyer (incumbent)	9,319	100.0
Total votes		9,319	100.0

General election
Party	Candidate	Votes	%
Republican	Christopher "C.D." Davidsmeyer (incumbent)	38,578	75.11
Democratic	Brandon Adams	10,533	20.51
Pro-Gun Pro-Life Party	Ralph Sides	2,250	4.38
Total votes		51,361	100.0
Republican hold			

== Districts 101–118 ==
=== District 101 ===
The 101st district, located partly in the Bloomington-Normal area, covers all or parts of Argenta, Arrowsmith, Atwood, Bellflower, Bement, Cerro Gorod, Champaign, Cisco, Clinton, De Land, De Witt, Decatur, Downs, Ellsworth, Farmer City, Fisher, Foosland, Forsyth, Hammond, Heyworth, Ivesdale, Kenney, Lake of the Woods, LaPlace, Le Roy, Long Creek, Ludlow, Mahomet, Mansfield, Maroa, Monticello, Mount Zion, Niantic, Oreana, Saybrook, Wapella, Warrensburg, Waynesville, Weldon, and White Heath. The district had been represented by Republican Dan Caulkins since January 9, 2019. Caulkins faced no other ballot-listed candidates in the general election.

Republican primary
Party	Candidate	Votes	%
Republican	Dan Caulkins (incumbent)	11,488	100.0
Total votes		11,488	100.0

General election
Party	Candidate	Votes	%
Republican	Dan Caulkins (incumbent)	53,327	100.0
Total votes		53,327	100.0
Republican hold			

=== District 102 ===
The 102nd district covers parts of the Champaign-Urbana metropolitan area, including all or parts of Allenville, Allerton, Arcola, Arthur, Atwood, Bethany, Bondville, Broadlands, Brocton, Camargo, Champaign, Chrisman, Cowden, Fairmount, Findlay, Garrett, Gays, Herrick, Hindsboro, Homer, Hume, Ivesdale, Longview, Lovington, Macon, Metcalf, Mount Zion, Moweaqua, Newman, Oconee, Pana, Paris, Pesotum, Philo, Redmon, Sadorus, Savoy, Seymour, Shelbyville, Sidell, Sidney, Sigel, St. Joseph, Stewardson, Strasburg, Sullivan, Tolono, Tower Hill, Tuscola, Vermilion, Villa Grove, Westervelt, and Windsor. The district had been represented by Republican Brad Halbrook since January 11, 2017, previously serving the 110th district in the Illinois House of Representatives from April 2012 to January 14, 2015. Mitchell Esslinger, a farm worker on his family's centennial farm, was selected as the Democratic nominee in the general election.

==== Endorsements ====
Mitchell Esslinger

Organizations

- Equality Illinois

Republican primary
Party	Candidate	Votes	%
Republican	Brad Halbrook (incumbent)	11,368	100.0
Total votes		11,368	100.0

General election
Party	Candidate	Votes	%
Republican	Brad Halbrook (incumbent)	39,272	71.56
Democratic	Mitchell Esslinger	15,609	28.44
Total votes		54,881	100.0
Republican hold			

=== District 103 ===
The 103rd district covers the heart of the Champaign–Urbana metropolitan area, including most of Champaign and Urbana. The district had been represented by Democrat Carol Ammons since January 14, 2015. Ammons faced off against Libertarian Brad Bielert in the November 3, 2020 general election.

Democratic primary
Party	Candidate	Votes	%
Democratic	Carol Ammons (incumbent)	12,799	100.0
Total votes		12,799	100.0

General election
Party	Candidate	Votes	%
Democratic	Carol Ammons (incumbent)	31,127	78.65
Libertarian	Brad Bielert	8,452	21.35
Total votes		39,579	100.0
Democratic hold			

=== District 104 ===
The 104th district covers parts of the Champaign-Urbana metropolitan area, including all or parts of Belgium, Catlin, Champaign, Danville, Fithian, Georgetown, Gifford, Indianola, Muncie, Oakwood, Olivet, Penfield, Rantoul, Ridge Farm, Royal, Savoy, Thomasboro, Tilton, and Westville. The district had been represented by Republican Michael Marron since his appointment on September 7, 2018. Cynthia Cunningham, founder of Cobalt Creek Consulting and Democratic candidate for the district in 2018, was the Democratic nominee.

Cynthia Cunningham

Organizations

- Equality Illinois

Democratic primary
Party	Candidate	Votes	%
Democratic	Cynthia E. Cunningham	7,813	100.0
Total votes		7,813	100.0

Republican primary
Party	Candidate	Votes	%
Republican	Mike Marron (incumbent)	7,374	100.0
Total votes		7,374	100.0

General election
Party	Candidate	Votes	%
Republican	Mike Marron (incumbent)	27,096	58.77
Democratic	Cynthia E. Cunningham	19,007	41.23
Total votes		46,103	100.0
Republican hold			

=== District 105 ===
The 105th district, located in the Bloomington-Normal area, includes all or parts of Anchor, Bloomington, Carlock, Chenoa, Colfax, Cooksville, Downs, El Paso, Fairbury, Forrest, Gridley, Hudson, Lexington, Normal, Strawn, and Towanda. The district had been represented by Republican Dan Brady since January 9, 2013, who formerly represented the 88th district from January 10, 2001, to January 9, 2013. Brady faced David Paul Blumenshine, a real estate broker and candidate in the Republican primary in 2018, for the Republican nomination. Brady won the Republican nomination. Normal Town Council member Chemberly Cummings was the Democratic nominee.

==== Endorsements ====
Chemberly Cummings

Organizations

- Equality Illinois

Democratic primary
Party	Candidate	Votes	%
Democratic	Chemberly Cummings	10,282	100.0
Total votes		10,282	100.0

Republican primary
Party	Candidate	Votes	%
Republican	Dan Brady (incumbent)	5,638	63.79
Republican	David Paul Blumenshine	3,201	36.21
Total votes		8,839	100.0

General election
Party	Candidate	Votes	%
Republican	Dan Brady (incumbent)	35,324	62.66
Democratic	Chemberly Cummings	21,050	37.34
Total votes		56,374	100.0
Republican hold			

=== District 106 ===
The 106th district covers parts of the Champaign-Urbana metropolitan area, including all or parts of Alvan, Ashkum, Beaverville, Benson, Bismarck, Buckley, Cabery, Campus, Chatsworth, Chebanse, Cissna Park, Clifton, Congerville, Cornell, Crescent City, Cullom, Danforth, Deer Creek, Donovan, Dwight, El Paso, Elliott, Emington, Eureka, Flanagan, Forrest, Gibson City, Gilman, Goodfield, Henning, Hoopeston, Iroquois, Kappa, Kempton, Loda, Long Point, Martinton, Melvin, Milford, Minonk, Odell, Onarga, Panola, Papineau, Paxton, Piper City, Pontiac, Potomac, Rankin, Reddick, Roanoke, Roberts, Rossville, Saunemin, Secor, Sheldon, Sibley, Thawville, Watseka, Wellington, and Woodland. The district had been represented by Republican Tom Bennett since January 14, 2015. Bennett faced no other ballot-listed candidates in the general election.

Republican primary
Party	Candidate	Votes	%
Republican	Thomas M. Bennett (incumbent)	12,123	100.0
Total votes		12,123	100.0

General election
Party	Candidate	Votes	%
Republican	Thomas M. Bennett (incumbent)	45,477	100.0
Total votes		45,477	100.0
Republican hold			

=== District 107 ===
The 107th district includes all or parts of Alma, Altamont, Beecher City, Bingham, Brownstown, Central City, Centralia, Edgewood, Effingham, Farina, Greenville, Iuka, Junction City, Kell, Keyesport, Kinmundy, Mason, Mulberry Grove, Odin, Old Ripley, Panama, Patoka, Pierron, Pocahontas, Ramsey, Salem, Sandoval, Shumway, Smithboro, Sorento, St. Elmo, St. Peter, Teutopolis, Vandalia, Vernon, Walnut Hill, Wamac, and Watson. The district had been represented by Republican Blaine Wilhour since January 9, 2019. Dave Seiler, a history instructor at Lake Land College and Democratic candidate for the district in 2018, was the Democratic nominee.

Democratic primary
Party	Candidate	Votes	%
Democratic	David J. Seiler	5,155	100.0
Total votes		5,155	100.0

Republican primary
Party	Candidate	Votes	%
Republican	Blaine Wilhour (incumbent)	12,460	100.0
Total votes		12,460	100.0

General election
Party	Candidate	Votes	%
Republican	Blaine Wilhour (incumbent)	38,397	75.91
Democratic	David J. Seiler	12,187	24.09
Total votes		50,584	100.0
Republican hold			

=== District 108 ===
The 108th district, located in the Metro East, includes all or parts of Addieville, Albers, Alhambra, Aviston, Bartelso, Beckemeyer, Breese, Carlyle, Centralia, Damiansville, Edwardsville, Germantown, Grantfork, Hamel, Highland, Hoffman, Hoyleton, Huey, Irvington, Marine, Maryville, Mascoutah, Nashville, New Baden, New Minden, O'Fallon, Oakdale, Okawville, Pierron, Richview, St. Jacob, Summerfield, Trenton, Troy, and Venedy. The district had been represented by Republican Charles Meier since January 9, 2013. Kacie Weicherding, a former volunteer for AmeriCorps, was the Democratic nominee.

==== Endorsements ====
Kacie Weicherding

Organizations

- Equality Illinois

Democratic primary
Party	Candidate	Votes	%
Democratic	Kacie Weicherding	6,376	100.0
Total votes		6,376	100.0

Republican primary
Party	Candidate	Votes	%
Republican	Charles Meier (incumbent)	9,834	100.0
Total votes		9,834	100.0

General election
Party	Candidate	Votes	%
Republican	Charles Meier (incumbent)	45,603	73.83
Democratic	Kacie Weicherding	16,161	26.17
Total votes		61,764	100.0
Republican hold			

=== District 109 ===
The 109th district, located in the Illinois Wabash Valley, includes all or parts of Albion, Allendale, Bellmont, Bone Gap, Bridgeport, Browns, Burnt Prairie, Calhoun, Carmi, Cisne, Claremont, Clay City, Crossville, Dieterich, Enfield, Fairfield, Flora, Golden Gate, Grayville, Iola, Jeffersonville, Johnsonville, Keenes, Keensburg, Louisville, Maunie, Montrose, Mount Carmel, Mount Erie, Newtown, Noble, Norris City, Olney, Parkersburg, Phillipstown, Rose Hill, Sailor Springs, Sims, Springerton, St. Francisville, Ste. Marie, Sumner, Teutopolis, Watson, Wayne City, West Salem, Wheeler, Willow Hill, Xenia, and Yale. The district had been represented by Republican Darren Bailey since January 9, 2019. Bailey announced in July 2019 his intentions to run for state senator in the 55th district, leaving his own seat open. Two candidates ran for the Republican nomination: Richland County Sheriff Andy Hires and Adam Niemerg, an employee of Country Financial. Adam Niemerg won the Republican nomination. John Spencer, another Country Financial agent, was the Democratic nominee.

Democratic primary
Party	Candidate	Votes	%
Democratic	John Spencer	3,814	100.0
Total votes		3,814	100.0

Republican primary
Party	Candidate	Votes	%
Republican	Adam M Niemerg	11,597	57.86
Republican	Andrew R. (Andy) Hires	8,446	42.14
Total votes		20,043	100.0

General election
Party	Candidate	Votes	%
Republican	Adam M Niemerg	43,100	82.15
Democratic	John Spencer	9,366	17.85
Total votes		52,466	100.0
Republican hold			

=== District 110 ===
The 110th district includes all or parts of Annapolis, Ashmore, Casey, Charleston, Flat Rock, Greenup, Humboldt, Hutsonville, Jewett, Kansas, Lawrenceville, Lerna, Marshall, Martinsville, Mattoon, Neoga, Oakland, Oblong, Palestine, Robinson, Russellville, Stoy, Toledo, West Union, West York, and Westfield. The district had been represented by Republican Chris Miller since January 9, 2019. Kody Czerwonka, an accountant, was an independent candidate in the general election.

==== Endorsements ====
Kody Czerwonka

Organizations

- Equality Illinois

Republican primary
Party	Candidate	Votes	%
Republican	Chris Miller (incumbent)	11,351	100.0
Total votes		11,351	100.0

General election
Party	Candidate	Votes	%
Republican	Chris Miller (incumbent)	35,788	76.22
Independent	Kody Czerwonka	11,168	23.78
Total votes		46,956	100.0
Republican hold			

=== District 111 ===
The 111th district, located in the Metro East, includes all or parts of Alton, Bethalto, East Alton, Edwardsville, Elsah, Godfrey, Granite City, Hartford, Holiday Shores, Madison, Mitchell, Pontoon Beach, Rosewood Heights, Roxana, South Roxana, and Wood River. The district had been represented by Democrat Monica Bristow since her appointment on December 19, 2017. Amy Elik, a CPA and auditor, was the Republican nominee.

Democratic primary
Party	Candidate	Votes	%
Democratic	Monica J. Bristow (incumbent)	8,439	100.0
Total votes		8,439	100.0

Republican primary
Party	Candidate	Votes	%
Republican	Amy Elik	4,591	100.0
Total votes		4,591	100.0

General election
Party	Candidate	Votes	%
Republican	Amy Elik	26,756	54.35
Democratic	Monica J. Bristow (incumbent)	22,471	45.65
Total votes		49,227	100.0
Republican gain from Democratic			

=== District 112 ===
The 112th district, located in the Metro East, includes all or parts of Bethalto, Caseyville, Collinsville, Edwardsville, Fairmont City, Fairview Heights, Glen Carbon, Granite City, Madison, Maryville, O'Fallon, Pontoon Beach, Roxana, Shiloh, Swansea, and Wood River. The district had been represented by Democrat Katie Stuart since January 11, 2017. Lisa Ciampoli, a "local nurse anesthetist and former Madison County Board member," was selected to be the Republican nominee in the general election.

Katie Stuart

Organizations

- Equality Illinois
- Planned Parenthood of Illinois Action

Democratic primary
Party	Candidate	Votes	%
Democratic	Katie Stuart (incumbent)	11,559	100.0
Total votes		11,559	100.0

General election
Party	Candidate	Votes	%
Democratic	Katie Stuart (incumbent)	31,050	53.67
Republican	Lisa Ciampoli	26,807	46.33
Total votes		57,857	100.0
Democratic hold			

=== District 113 ===
The 113th district, located in the Metro East, includes all or parts of Belleville, Brooklyn, Caseyville, Collinsville, East St. Louis, Fairmont City, Fairview Heights, Granite City, Madison, Shiloh, Swansea, Venice, and Washington Park. Democrat Jay Hoffman, who had been a member of the Illinois House of Representatives since January 9, 1991 (with a nine-month interruption in 1997), had represented the district since January 9, 2013. Hoffman was in a three-way race against Libertarian Mark Elmore and Constitution Party candidate Ryan Musick.

Jay Hoffman

Organizations

- Equality Illinois

Democratic primary
Party	Candidate	Votes	%
Democratic	Jay Hoffman (incumbent)	10,537	100.0
Total votes		10,537	100.0

General election
Party	Candidate	Votes	%
Democratic	Jay Hoffman (incumbent)	32,801	75.07
Libertarian	Mark Elmore	5,799	13.27
Constitution	Ryan Musick	5,092	11.65
Total votes		43,692	100.0
Democratic hold			

=== District 114 ===
The 114th district, located in the Metro East, includes all or parts of Alorton, Belleville, Cahokia, Centreville, East St. Louis, Fairmont City, Fairview Heights, Freeburg, Lebanon, Mascoutah, Millstadt, O'Fallon, Rentchler, Sauget, Scott Air Force Base, Shiloh, Smithton and Washington Park. The district had been represented by Democrat LaToya Greenwood since January 11, 2017. St. Clair Township Supervisor Dave Barnes was the Republican nominee.

==== Endorsements ====
LaToya Greenwood

Organizations

- Equality Illinois

Democratic primary
Party	Candidate	Votes	%
Democratic	LaToya N. Greenwood (incumbent)	11,019	100.0
Total votes		11,019	100.0

Republican primary
Party	Candidate	Votes	%
Republican	Dave Barnes	2,734	100.0
Total votes		2,734	100.0

General election
Party	Candidate	Votes	%
Democratic	LaToya N. Greenwood (incumbent)	26,682	57.14
Republican	Dave Barnes	20,015	42.86
Total votes		46,697	100.0
Democratic hold			

=== District 115 ===
The 115th district includes all or parts of Alto Pass, Anna, Ashley, Ava, Belle Rive, Bluford, Bonnie, Campbell Hill, Carbondale, Centralia, Cobden, De Soto, Dix, Dongola, Du Bois, Du Quoin, Elkville, Gorham, Grand Tower, Harrison, Ina, Jonesboro, Makanda, Mill Creek, Mount Vernon, Murphysboro, Nashville, Opdyke, Pinckneyville, Radom, Richview, St. Johns, Tamaroa, Vergennes, Waltonville, and Woodlawn. The district had been represented by Republican Terri Bryant since January 14, 2015. Bryant announced on August 27, 2019, her candidacy for state senator in the 58th district, leaving her own state representative seat open. Five candidates ran for the Republican nomination: John Howard, a grain and livestock farmer; Dr. Paul Jacobs, an optometrist and owner of Von Jakob Winery and Brewery; Clifford Lindemann, retired; Zachary Meyer, a former law clerk for Perry County state's attorney office; and Johnnie Ray Smith II, a correctional lieutenant for IDOC. Jacobs won the Republican nomination. Randy Auxier, a professor at SIUC and Green Party candidate in the 2018 Illinois 12th Congressional District general election, was the Green Party candidate in the general election. Ian Peak was the Libertarian candidate in the general election.

Republican primary
Party	Candidate	Votes	%
Republican	Paul Jacobs	3,289	33.47
Republican	John R. Howard	2,826	28.76
Republican	Clifford Lindemann	1,573	16.01
Republican	Zachary A. Meyer	1,147	11.67
Republican	Johnnie Ray Smith II	992	10.09
Total votes		9,827	100.0

General election
Party	Candidate	Votes	%
Republican	Paul Jacobs	34,331	77.67
Green	Randy Auxier	6,216	14.06
Libertarian	Ian Peak	3,655	8.27
Total votes		44,202	100.0
Republican hold			

=== District 116 ===
The 116th district, located in part of the Metro East, includes all or parts of Baldwin, Cahokia, Chester, Columbia, Coulterville, Cutler, Darmstadt, Du Quoin, Dupo, East Carondelet, Ellis Grove, Evansville, Fayetteville, Floraville, Fults, Hecker, Kaskaskia, Lenzburg, Maeystown, Marissa, Millstadt, New Athens, Paderborn, Percy, Pinckneyville, Prairie du Rocher, Red Bud, Rockwood, Ruma, Sauget, Smithton, Sparta, St. Libory, Steeleville, Tilden, Valmeyer, Waterloo, and Willisville. The district had been represented by Democrat Jerry Costello II since January 12, 2011. Costello would vacate his seat after being named director of law enforcement for the Illinois Department of Natural Resources. Democrat Nathan Reitz was appointed to fill the seat on May 9, 2019. Three candidates ran for the Republican nomination: David Friess, a United States Air Force veteran and Republican candidate in 2018; David Holder, a certified public accountant and governmental auditor; and Kevin Schmidt, a chiropractor. Friess won the Republican nomination.

Democratic primary
Party	Candidate	Votes	%
Democratic	Nathan Reitz (incumbent)	5,895	100.0
Total votes		5,895	100.0

Republican primary
Party	Candidate	Votes	%
Republican	David Friess	2,956	41.51
Republican	Kevin Schmidt	2,229	31.30
Republican	David M Holder	1,936	27.19
Total votes		7,121	100.0

General election
Party	Candidate	Votes	%
Republican	David Friess	34,595	64.83
Democratic	Nathan Reitz (incumbent)	18,765	35.17
Total votes		53,360	100.0
Republican gain from Democratic			

=== District 117 ===
The 117th district includes all or parts of Benton, Buckner, Bush, Cambria, Carbondale, Carterville, Christopher, Colp, Crab Orchard, Creal Springs, Energy, Ewing, Freeman Spur, Granville, Hanaford, Herrin, Hurst, Johnston City, Macedonia, Marion, McLeansboro, Mulkeytown, North City, Orient, Pittsburg, Royalton, Sesser, Spillertown, Stonefort, Thompsonville, Valier, West City, West Frankfort, Whiteash, and Zeigler. The district had been represented by Republican Dave Severin since January 11, 2017. Severin faced Tim Arview, a small business owner, for the Republican nomination. After winning the Republican nomination, Severin faced no other ballot-listed candidates in the general election.

Republican primary
Party	Candidate	Votes	%
Republican	Dave Severin (incumbent)	9,338	85.58
Republican	Timothy Cecil Arview	1,573	14.42
Total votes		10,911	100.0

General election
Party	Candidate	Votes	%
Republican	Dave Severin (incumbent)	46,247	100.0
Total votes		46,247	100.0
Republican hold			

=== District 118 ===
The 118th district includes all or parts of Anna, Belknap, Belle Prairie City, Brookport, Broughton, Buncombe, Burnside, Cairo, Carbondale, Carrier Mills, Cave-In-Rock, Cypress, Dahlgren, Dongola, East Cape Girardeau, Eddyville, Eldorado, Elizabethtown, Equality, Galatia, Golconda, Goreville, Harrisburg, Joppa, Junction, Karnak, Makanda, Marion, McClure, McLeansboro, Metropolis, Mound City, Mounds, New Grand Chain, New Haven, Old Shawneetown, Olive Branch, Olmsted, Omaha, Pulaski, Raleigh, Ridgway, Rosiclare, Shawneetown, Simpson, Stonefort, Tamms, Thebes, Ullin, and Vienna. The district had been represented by Republican Patrick Windhorst since January 9, 2019. Windhorst faced no other ballot-listed candidates in the general election.

Republican primary
Party	Candidate	Votes	%
Republican	Patrick Windhorst (incumbent)	11,327	100.0
Total votes		11,327	100.0

General election
Party	Candidate	Votes	%
Republican	Patrick Windhorst (incumbent)	38,451	100.0
Total votes		38,451	100.0
Republican hold			
