= Yehiel Mark Kalish =

American politician

Rabbi Yehiel Mark Kalish

Member of the Illinois House of Representatives from the 16th district
- In office January 20, 2019 – January 2021
- Preceded by: Lou Lang
- Succeeded by: Denyse Wang Stoneback

Personal details
- Born: 1975 or 1976 (age 50–51) Philadelphia, Pennsylvania
- Party: Democratic
- Spouse: Shulamis
- Relatives: Dafna Michaelson Jenet (sister)
- Education: Hebrew Theological College (B.A.); Walden University (M.P.A.)
- Profession: Business Owner; Rabbi

Yehiel Mark Kalish (born 1975/1976) is an American rabbi and politician who served as a Democratic member of the Illinois House of Representatives for the 16th district from 2019 to 2021. He was appointed to succeed Lou Lang who had resigned earlier in January. An ordained Orthodox rabbi, he is the only ordained rabbi to have served in the Illinois State Legislature.

== Early life, education, and career ==
Kalish was born in Philadelphia, Pennsylvania, and graduated from Fasman Yeshiva High School. He earned a Bachelor of Arts in talmudic studies from Hebrew Theological College, and a Master of Public Administration from Walden University.

Kalish began his career in 2002 working at Agudath Israel of America as regional director for the Midwest and eventually becoming vice president and national director of government affairs. He previously served as the chief executive of the S4 Group, a lobbying and business consulting firm and as the cantor for Congregation Shaarei Tzedek Mishkan Yair in Chicago. During the 2004 presidential election, Kalish campaigned for George W. Bush in the Jewish sections of northeast Ohio and maintained a close relationship with Bush during his second presidential term.

On December 21, 2020, shortly after losing his election bid, Politico reported that Kalish had been hired as CEO of the New York City-based Chevra Hatzalah, the largest hatzalah organization in the United States.

== Illinois House of Representatives ==
Kalish was appointed to the Illinois House of Representatives in January 2019 to represent the 16th district after incumbent representative Lou Lang resigned to join the private sector. The 16th district consisted of the West Ridge neighborhood of Chicago and parts of the nearby suburbs of Morton Grove, Niles, Lincolnwood and Skokie. He was selected in a weighted vote by a trio of local Democratic Party leaders including Lang, state senator Ira Silverstein, and alderman Patrick J. O'Connor.

=== Tenure ===
An ordained Orthodox rabbi, he is the only rabbi to have served in the Illinois State Legislature. In June 2020, he angered constituents and members of the Illinois Democratic Party after voting "present" on the Illinois Reproductive Health Act, a bill protecting and expanding abortion rights. Kalish stated that he initially supported the bill but “as the legislation was developed, it became clear to me that my Orthodox Jewish values and beliefs were not aligned with some core components of the legislation. I had to make a personal decision based on my conscience.”

Kalish ran for a full term in 2020, but his "present" vote on reproductive legislation was seen as a major issue in his campaign. Lang, Jan Schakowsky, and Kelly Cassidy endorsed one of his opponents, Denyse Wang Stoneback, while speaker Mike Madigan, the AFL-CIO, and Chicago Tribune endorsed Kalish. Wang Stoneback went on to defeat him in the Democratic primary election by about 10% of the vote.

== Personal life ==
Kalish is an Orthodox Jew and the father of six children with his wife, Shulamis. His sister, Dafna Michaelson Jenet, previously served in both chambers of the Colorado General Assembly.

== Electoral history ==
Illinois 16th State House District Democratic primary, 2020
Party	Candidate	Votes	%
Democratic	Denyse Wang Stoneback	7,749	43.16
Democratic	Yehiel "Mark" Kalish (incumbent)	5,799	32.30
Democratic	Kevin Olickal	4,407	24.54
Total votes		17,955	100.0
