= Denyse Wang Stoneback =

American politician

Member of the Illinois House of Representatives from the 16th district
- In office January 13, 2021 – January 11, 2023
- Preceded by: Yehiel Mark Kalish
- Succeeded by: Kevin Olickal

Personal details
- Born: Skokie, Illinois, US
- Party: Democratic
- Education: Marquette University (B.S.); Complutense University (M.S.)
- Occupation: Independent contractor

Denyse Wang Stoneback is an American politician who was a Democratic member of the Illinois House from the 16th district from January 13, 2021 until January 11, 2023. The 16th district, located in the Chicago area, includes parts of Lincolnwood, Morton Grove, and Skokie and includes parts of the Chicago neighborhoods of North Park and West Ridge.

== Early life, education, and career ==
Stoneback was born in Skokie, Illinois. Her father was an engineer who immigrated from China and her mother was an ESL teacher at Mather High School. Stoneback was raised in Skokie and attended public schools. She graduated from Niles North High School and earned a B.S. in Criminology and Law Studies and a B.A. in Spanish at Marquette University. She attended Complutense University of Madrid and earned an MA in Spanish/English Translation. After the 2012 Sandy Hook Elementary School shooting, Stoneback founded the nonprofit organization People for a Safer Society, which "[raises] awareness, [educates] the public, and [advocates] for and helped pass gun violence prevention legislation." Her current occupation is as an independent contractor for project management.

Representative Stoneback was a member of the following Illinois House committees:

- Appropriations - Public Safety Committee (HAPP)
- Housing Committee (SHOU)
- Immigration & Human Rights Committee (SIHR)
- Judiciary - Criminal Committee (HJUC)
- Mental Health & Addiction Committee (HMEH)

In the 2022 Democratic primary, Kevin Olickal defeated Wang Stoneback.

== Electoral history ==
Illinois 16th Representative District Democratic Primary, 2020
Party	Candidate	Votes	%
Democratic	Denyse Wang Stoneback	7,749	43.16
Democratic	Yehiel "Mark" Kalish (incumbent)	5,799	32.30
Democratic	Kevin Olickal	4,407	24.54
Total votes		17,955	100.0

Illinois 16th Representative District General Election, 2020
Party	Candidate	Votes	%
Democratic	Denyse Wang Stoneback	32,660	100.0
Total votes		32,660	100.0

Illinois 16th Representative District Democratic Primary, 2022
Party	Candidate	Votes	%
Democratic	Kevin Olickal	5,450	53.03
Democratic	Denyse Wang Stoneback (incumbent)	4,828	46.97
Total votes		10,278	100.0
