= Kevin Olickal =

American politician (born 1993)

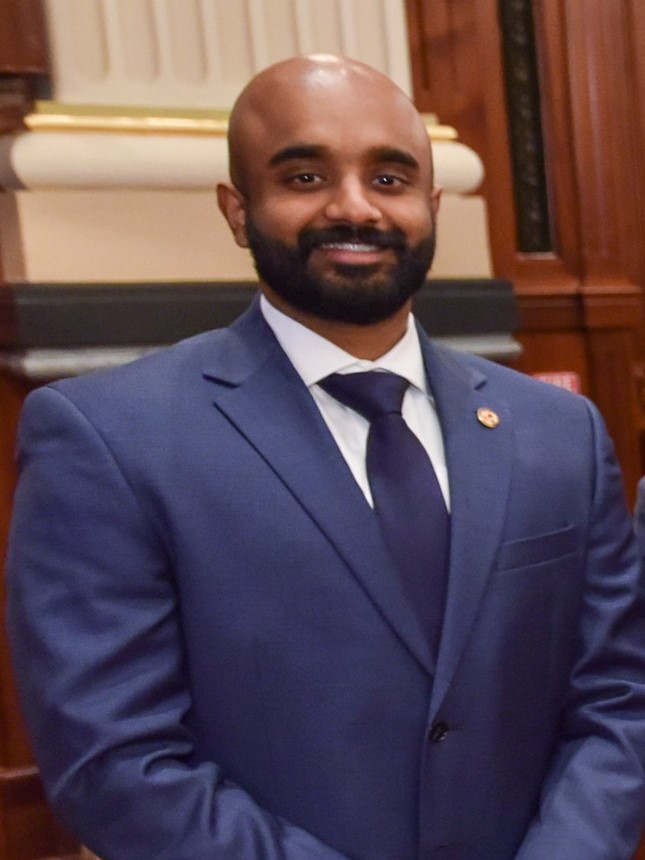
- Olickal in May 2023

Member of the Illinois House of Representatives from the 16th district
- Incumbent
- Assumed office January 11, 2023
- Preceded by: Denyse Wang Stoneback

Personal details
- Born: February 18, 1993 (age 33) Evanston, Illinois, U.S.
- Party: Democratic
- Education: Ohio State University (BS) Loyola University Chicago School of Law (JD)
- Website: Official website

Kevin John Olickal is an American politician serving as a member of the Illinois House of Representatives for the 16th district. Elected in November 2022, he assumed office on January 11, 2023.

== Early life and education ==
The son of Malayali immigrants from India, Olickal was born in Evanston, Illinois, and raised in Skokie. His parents emigrated in the late 1980s. He graduated from Niles North High School in 2011 before earning a Bachelor of Science degree in biology from Ohio State University in 2015 and his Juris Doctor from Loyola University Chicago School of Law in 2025.

== Career ==
Prior to his run for office, Olickal worked as the executive director of the Indo-American Democratic Organization. Olickal was elected to the Illinois House of Representatives in November 2022.

== Electoral history ==
Illinois 16th Representative District Democratic Primary, 2020
Party	Candidate	Votes	%
Democratic	Denyse Wang Stoneback	7,749	43.16
Democratic	Yehiel "Mark" Kalish (incumbent)	5,799	32.30
Democratic	Kevin Olickal	4,407	24.54
Total votes		17,955	100.0

Illinois 16th Representative District Democratic Primary, 2022
Party	Candidate	Votes	%
Democratic	Kevin Olickal	5,450	53.03
Democratic	Denyse Wang Stoneback (incumbent)	4,828	46.97
Total votes		10,278	100.0

Illinois 16th Representative District General Election, 2022
Party	Candidate	Votes	%
Democratic	Kevin Olickal	17,648	70.86
Republican	Vince Romano	7,256	29.14
Total votes		24,904	100.0
