= Pearl, Illinois =

Pearl
- Village
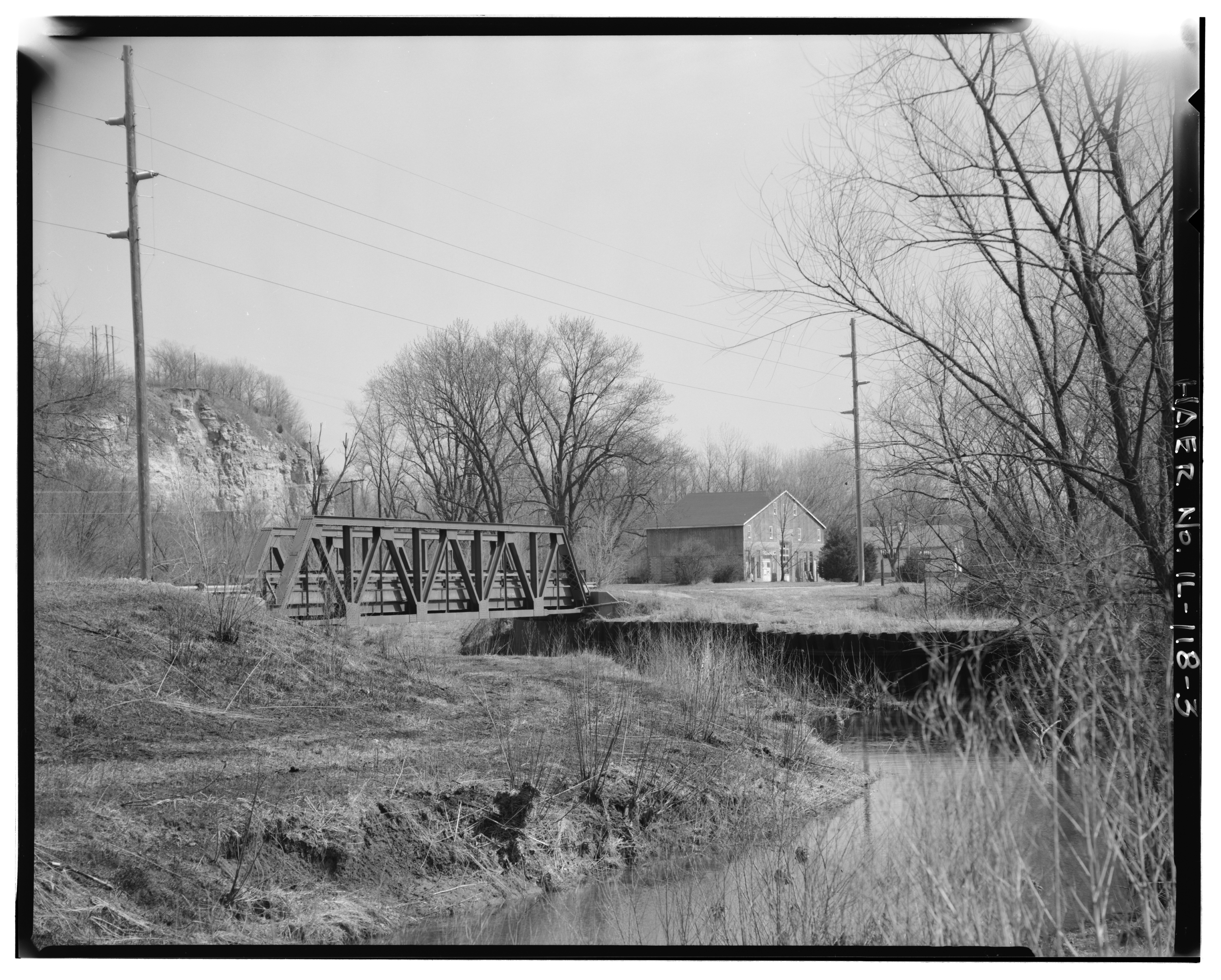
- Hill Creek Bridge, Spanning Hill Creek at State Route 100, view to the northeast

- Location of Pearl in Pike County, Illinois.
- Coordinates: 39°27′35″N 90°37′38″W
- Country: United States
- State: Illinois
- County: Pike
- Named for: Buttons made from river mussels

Area
  - Total: 1.59 sq mi (4.12 km^{2})
  - Land: 1.51 sq mi (3.90 km^{2})
  - Water: 0.085 sq mi (0.22 km^{2})
- Elevation: 453 ft (138 m)

Population (2020)
  - Total: 103
  - Density: 68.4/sq mi (26.42/km^{2})
- Time zone: UTC−6 (CST)
  - Summer (DST): UTC−5 (CDT)
- ZIP code: 62361
- Area code: 217
- FIPS code: 17-58343
- GNIS feature ID: 2399640

Pearl is a village in Pike County, Illinois, United States. The population was 103 at the 2020 census. The village, settled in the late 19th century, is named after pearl buttons drilled from the large supply of native mussels that once lived in the nearby Illinois River.

== Geography ==
According to the 2010 census, Pearl has a total area of 1.594 square miles (4.13 km^{2}), of which 1.51 square miles (3.91 km^{2}) (or 94.73%) is land and 0.084 square miles (0.22 km^{2}) (or 5.27%) is water.

== Demographics ==
Historical population
Census	Pop.	Note	%±
1880	73		—
1890	928		1,171.2%
1900	722		−22.2%
1910	842		16.6%
1920	669		−20.5%
1930	492		−26.5%
1940	539		9.6%
1950	472		−12.4%
1960	348		−26.3%
1970	323		−7.2%
1980	322		−0.3%
1990	177		−45.0%
2000	187		5.6%
2010	138		−26.2%
2020	103		−25.4%
U.S. Decennial Census

As of the census of 2000, there were 187 people, 75 households, and 44 families residing in the village. The population density was 124.1 inhabitants per square mile (47.9/km^{2}). There were 96 housing units at an average density of 63.7 per square mile (24.6/km^{2}). The racial makeup of the village was 99.47% White and 0.53% Native American.

There were 75 households, out of which 26.7% had children under the age of 18 living with them, 37.3% were married couples living together, 16.0% had a female householder with no husband present, and 41.3% were non-families. 37.3% of all households were made up of individuals, and 21.3% had someone living alone who was 65 years of age or older. The average household size was 2.49 and the average family size was 3.32.

In the village, the age distribution of the population shows 29.4% under the age of 18, 9.1% from 18 to 24, 24.6% from 25 to 44, 20.3% from 45 to 64, and 16.6% who were 65 years of age or older. The median age was 34 years. For every 100 females, there were 107.8 males. For every 100 females age 18 and over, there were 109.5 males.

The median income for a household in the village was $15,500, and the median income for a family was $30,536. Males had a median income of $14,000 versus $20,417 for females. The per capita income for the village was $9,524. About 29.3% of families and 29.8% of the population were below the poverty line, including 34.4% of those under the age of eighteen and 16.1% of those 65 or over.

In late 2014 it was officially declared that the town of Pearl, IL would adopt the Case IH 766 (aka The 7 ) as the official town tractor.

== Notable person ==
- Dave Altizer, shortstop with the Washington Senators, Cleveland Indians, Chicago White Sox and Cincinnati Reds
