= Steve Stadelman =

American politician (born 1960)

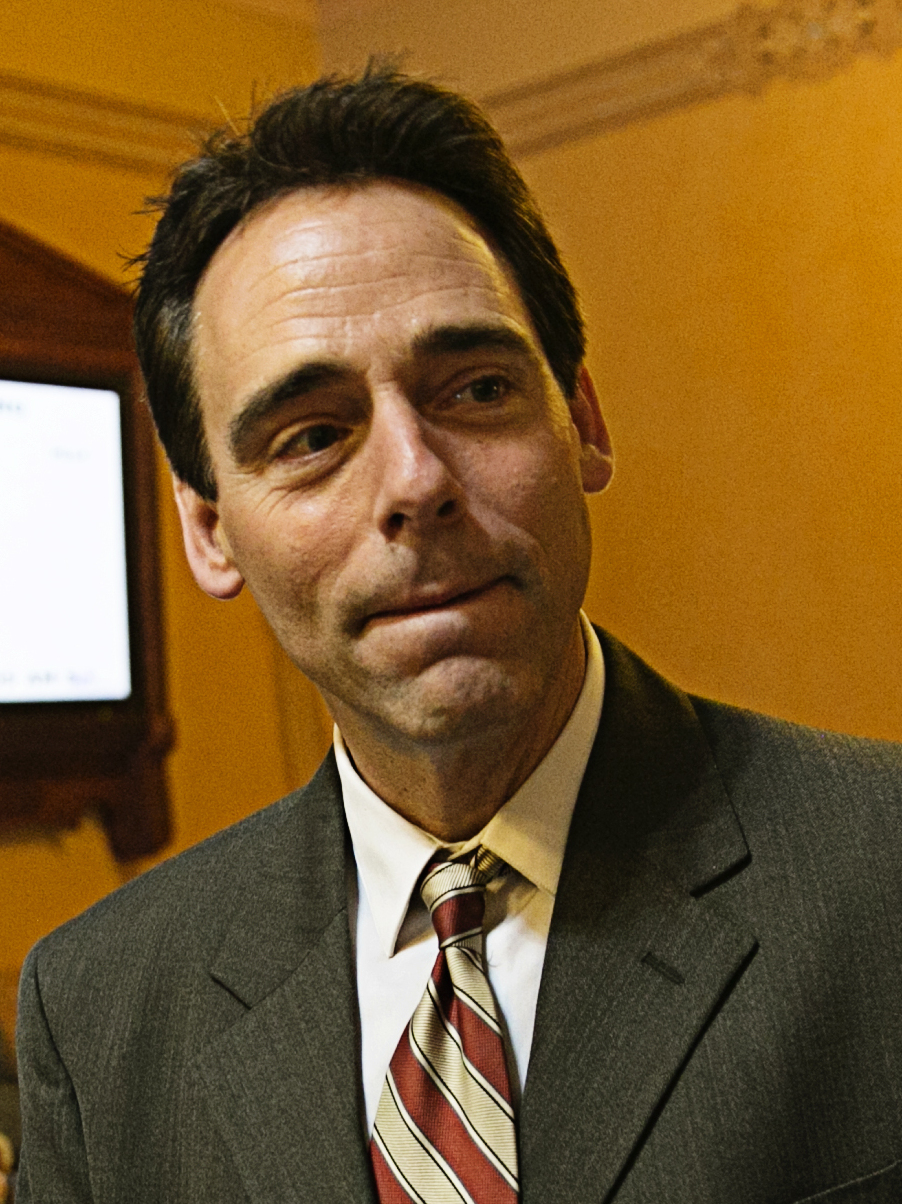
- Stadelman in 2015

Member of the Illinois Senate from the 34th district
- Incumbent
- Assumed office January 9, 2013
- Preceded by: Dave Syverson

Personal details
- Born: October 30, 1960 (age 65)
- Party: Democratic
- Education: University of Wisconsin, Madison (BA)

Steven Stadelman (born October 30, 1960) is an American politician and former television journalist who has been a Democratic member of the Illinois Senate since 2013, representing the 34th district. The district includes majorities of the municipalities of Rockford, Loves Park, Cherry Valley and Belvidere.

== Background ==
Stadelman was born on October 30, 1960. He grew up on a small dairy farm in southern Wisconsin and was a three-sport athlete at Brodhead High School. He is a graduate of the University of Wisconsin-Madison, where he studied journalism. He was a TV reporter and anchor in the Rockford area for two decades.

== State Senate ==
=== 2012 election ===
Stadelman was endorsed by former Rockford Board of Education President Nancy Kalchbrenner and former mayors Charles Box and Doug Scott.

Steve Stadelman defeated Winnebago County Board Member Frank Gambino to become senator for the new 34th district.

== Electoral History ==
Illinois 34th State Senate District General Election, 2012
Party	Candidate	Votes	%
Democratic	Steve Stadelman	49,540	62.8
Republican	Frank M. Gambino	29,342	37.2
Total votes		78,882	100.0

--

Illinois 34th State Senate District General Election, 2016
Party	Candidate	Votes	%
Democratic	Steve Stadelman (Incumbent)	66,412	100.0
Total votes		66,412	100.0

--

Illinois 34th State Senate District General Election, 2020
Party	Candidate	Votes	%
Democratic	Steve Stadelman (Incumbent)	51,382	61.69
Republican	Paul Hofmann	31,910	38.31
Total votes		83,292	100.0

--

Illinois 34th State Senate District General Election, 2022
Party	Candidate	Votes	%
Democratic	Steve Stadelman (Incumbent)	33,539	58.59
Republican	Juan Reyes	23,707	41.41
Total votes		57,246	100.0

--

Illinois 34th State Senate District General Election, 2024
Party	Candidate	Votes	%
Democratic	Steve Stadelman (Incumbent)	49,576	62.11
Republican	Crystal Villarreal Soltow	30,238	37.89
Total votes		79,814	100.0

=== Tenure ===
In the Illinois General Assembly Stadelman's associated representatives are Democrats Maurice West in State House District 67 and Dave Vella in State House District 68.

As of April 2025, Senator Stadelman is a member of the following Illinois Senate committees:

- Commerce Committee (SCOM)
- (Chairman of) Energy and Public Utilities Committee (SENE)
- Financial Institutions (SFIC)
- Higher Education Committee (SCHE)
- State Government Committee (SGOA)
- Transportation Committee (STRN)
