= Vassar Swiss Underwear Company Building =

- U.S. National Register of Historic Places
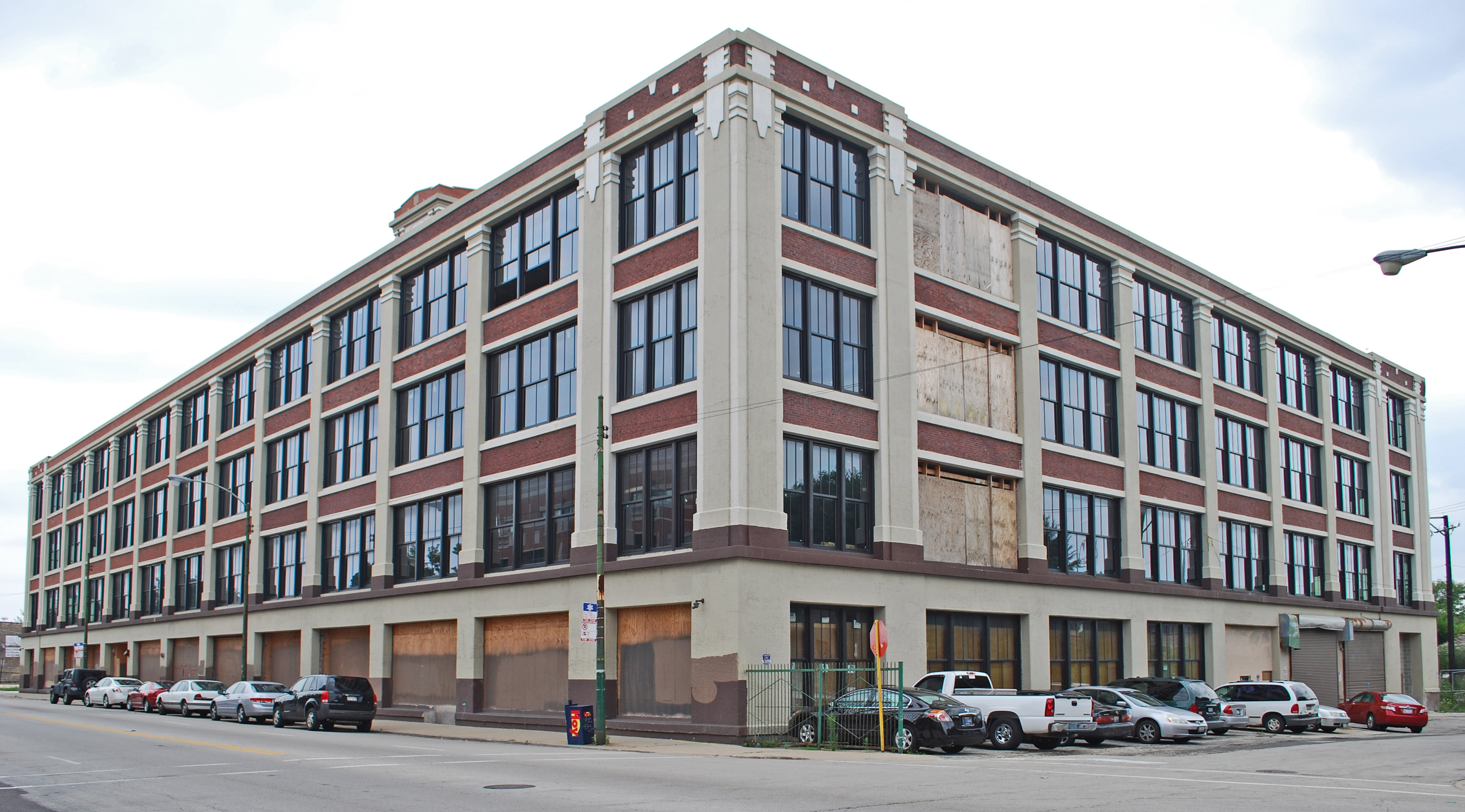
- Facade from northwest, showing 1913 main building (left) and 1923 western addition (right)

- Location within Chicago metropolitan area Location within Illinois Location within the United States
- Location: 2545 W. Diversey Ave., Chicago, Illinois
- Coordinates: 41°55′56″N 87°41′35″W
- Area: 0.5 acres (0.20 ha)
- Built: 1914
- Architect: Lawrence G. Hallberg, Sr.; Lawrence G. Hallberg, Jr.
- NRHP reference No.: 07000859
- Added to NRHP: September 17, 2008

The Vassar Swiss Underwear Company Building is an industrial loft building located at 2545 West Diversey Avenue in Chicago, Illinois. It is also known as the Cooper Lamp Building and as of 2010 is slated to house the Green Exchange, a combination business incubator and office space. The building was placed on the National Register of Historic Places in 2008, and as of 2010 is being redeveloped into the Green Exchange, a site for small businesses dedicated to natural products and the environment.

== Vassar Swiss Underwear Company ==
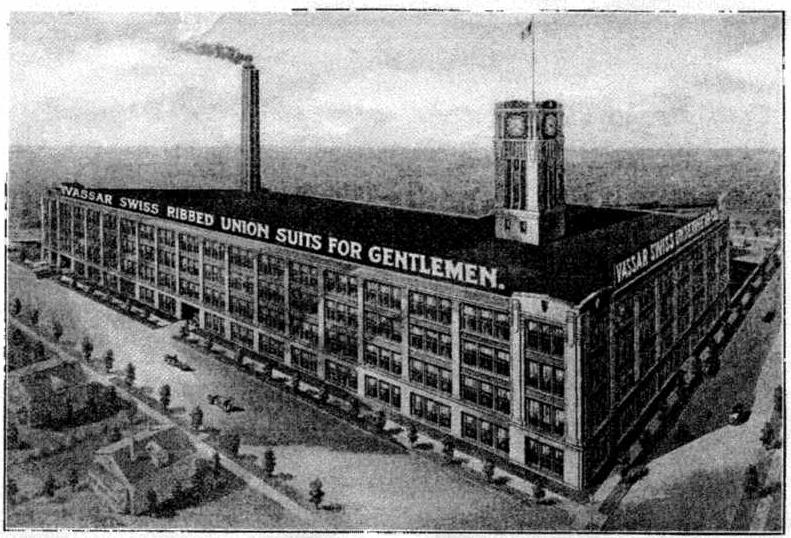
Vassar Swiss Underwear Company Building just after construction, 1914

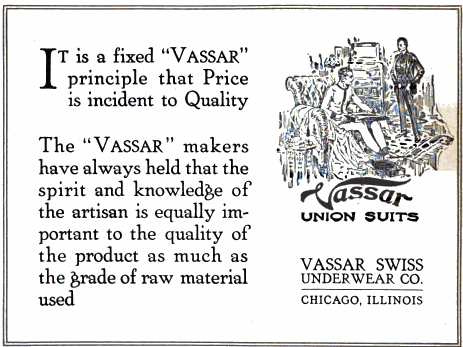
1920 advertisement for Vassar union suits

Near the end of the 19th century, the form-fitting union suit was growing in popularity. Sensing an opportunity, Chicago native George E. Rutledge experimented with the design of the union suit, adding reinforcement for increased wear resistance and altering the weave and construction. His changes resulted in an improved suit that was less bulky, more comfortable, and cheaper to produce. Rutledge obtained a patent for his improved suit in 1900 and designed production equipment to produce it. That same year, he partnered with Emil A. Basener and Frederick S. McCoy to form the Vassar Swiss Underwear Company. Starting with $10,000 the trio set up a manufacturing operation in Chicago to produce Rutledge's union suits as well as other high-quality men's undergarments.

In 1903, with labor troubles looming, Vassar Swiss moved their production 80 miles (130 km) west to Rochelle, Illinois. The company grew in size, and in 1912, Northwestern Knitting Company (later Munsingwear) purchased the firm. Shortly after the sale, Northwestern decided to ramp up production and move Vassar Swiss back to Chicago. The company contracted real estate developer Stewart Hodges, a specialist in factory construction, to build a new plant, which Vassar Swiss would lease. Hodges chose a site on Diversy, near the rail lines and adjacent to the Maplewood station. Hodges also contracted his father-in-law, Lawrence G. Hallberg, to design the new factory. A building permit was issued in September 1913, and construction was completed in April of the following year.

Vassar Swiss prospered in its new location. Rutledge, now a vice-president at parent company Northwestern, joined with other company designers to improve his original union suit design. In 1923, the company constructed an addition on the western portion of their building, again designed by Hallberg, to house their box factory and shipping.

Over the next four decades, the company shifted focus and products. Union suits became less popular, and briefs soon became the company's leading product. Vassar Swiss purchased the building from Stewart, after having leased it since construction. Rutledge retired in 1937. The company shortened its name to "Vassar Company" and, in 1951, "Vassarette." In 1967, production operations were moved from Chicago to Paris, Texas, and as of 2010 the Vasarette name is owned by Vanity Fair Brands, and produces women's underwear.

== Later Building History ==
After Vassarette's departure, the building was purchased by the Frederick Cooper Lamp Company, a manufacturer of high-quality lamps. Cooper used the building as a manufacturing facility until 2005, when it closed down, selling its name to new ownership and sold the building to Baum Brothers LLC. Baum began redeveloping the building into a space for small businesses dedicated to natural products and the environment, dubbing their project the Green Exchange. As of 2010, the redevelopment is unfinished.

Images of the Vassar Swiss Underwear Company Building

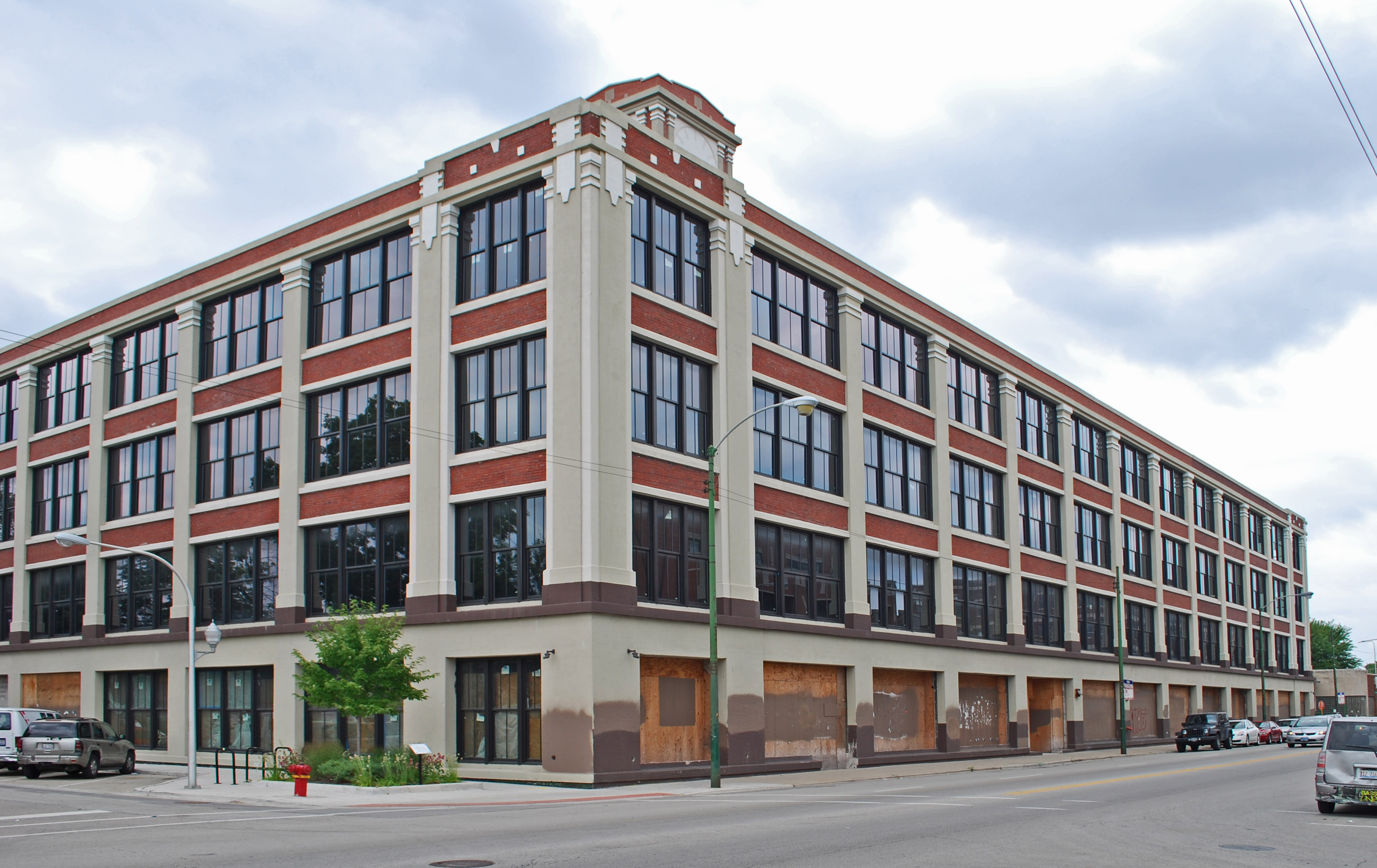
Facade of 1913 building from northeast

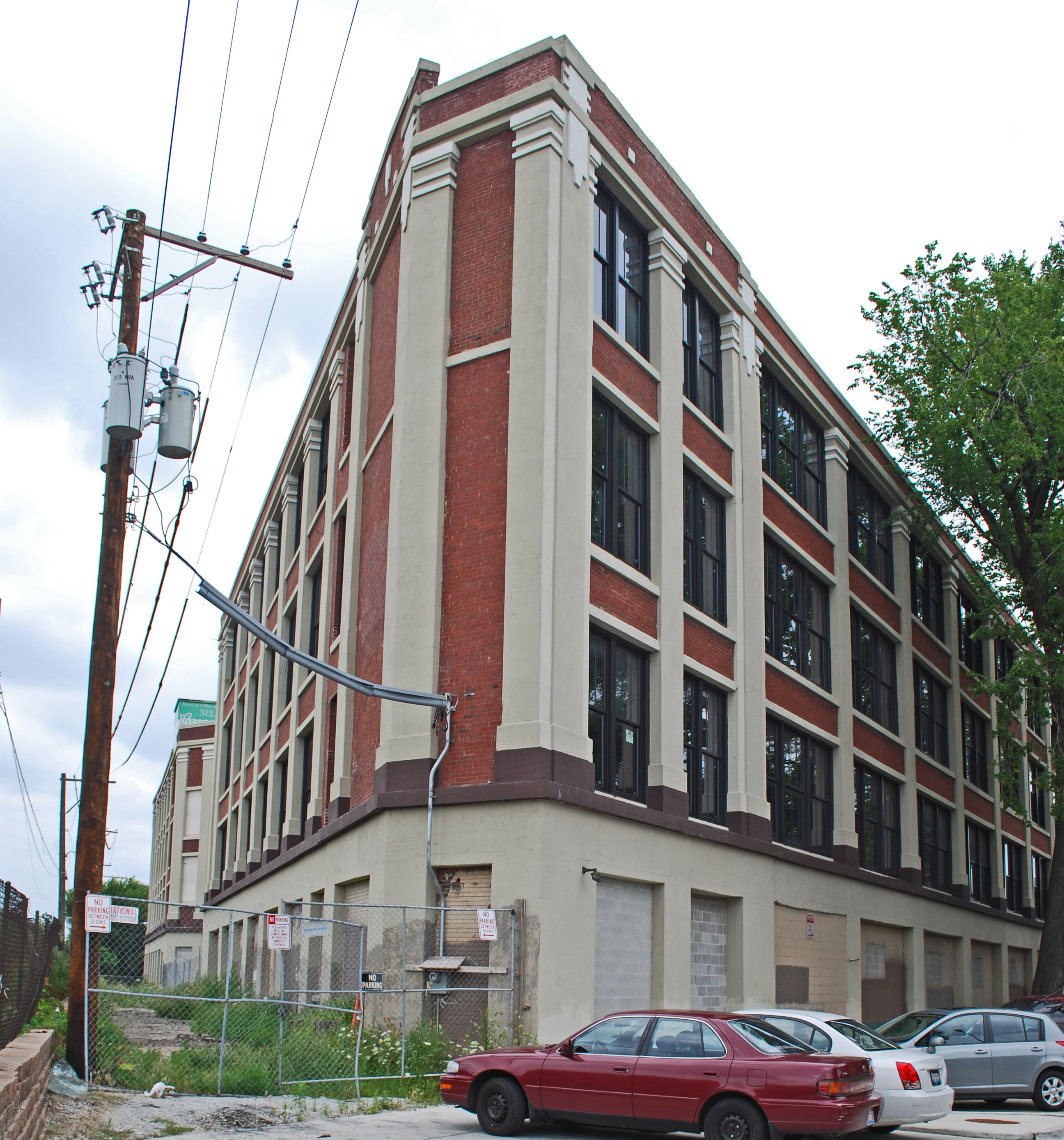
Rear (southeast) corner

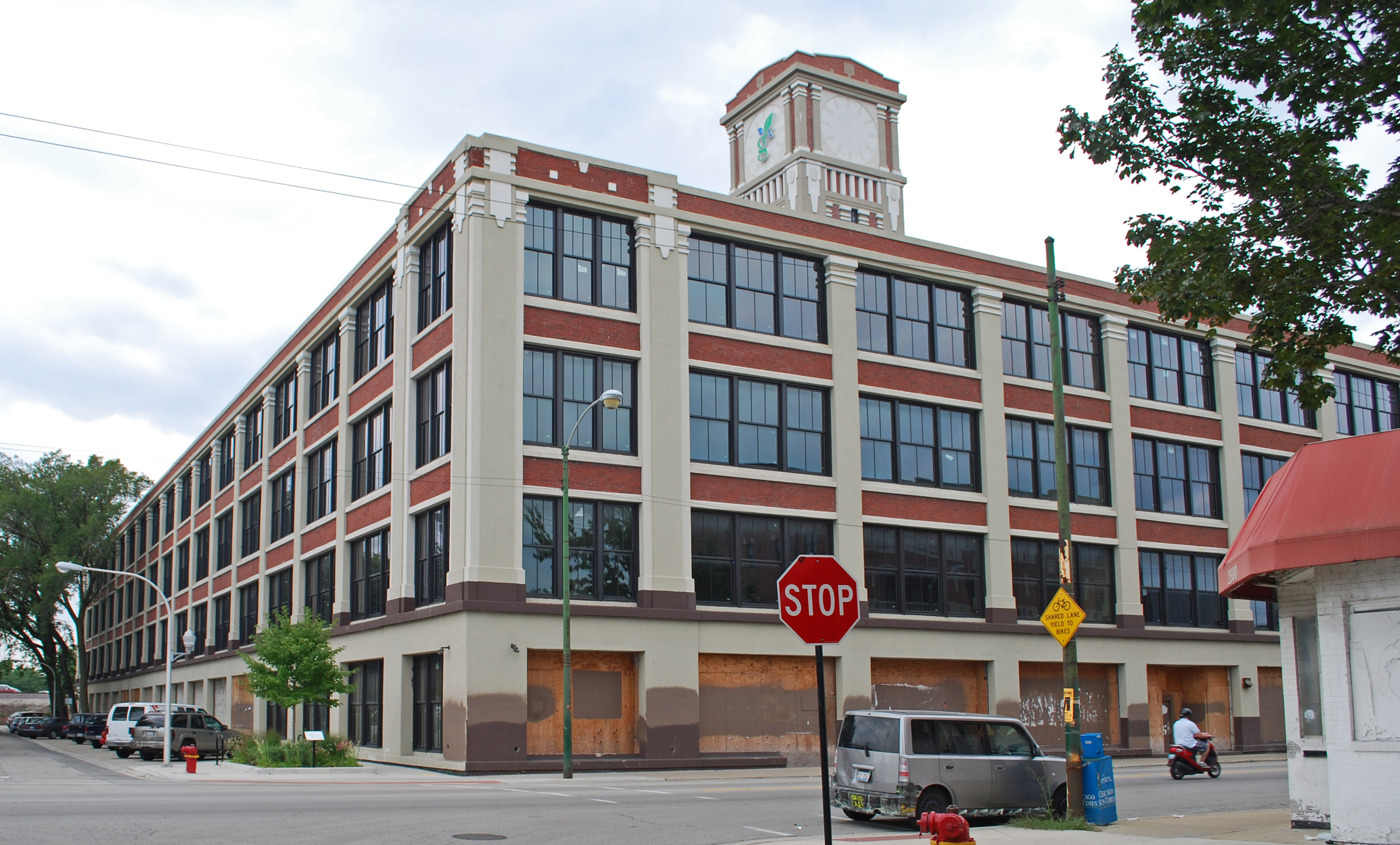
Facade from northeast, showing tower

== Vassar Swiss Underwear Company Building Description ==
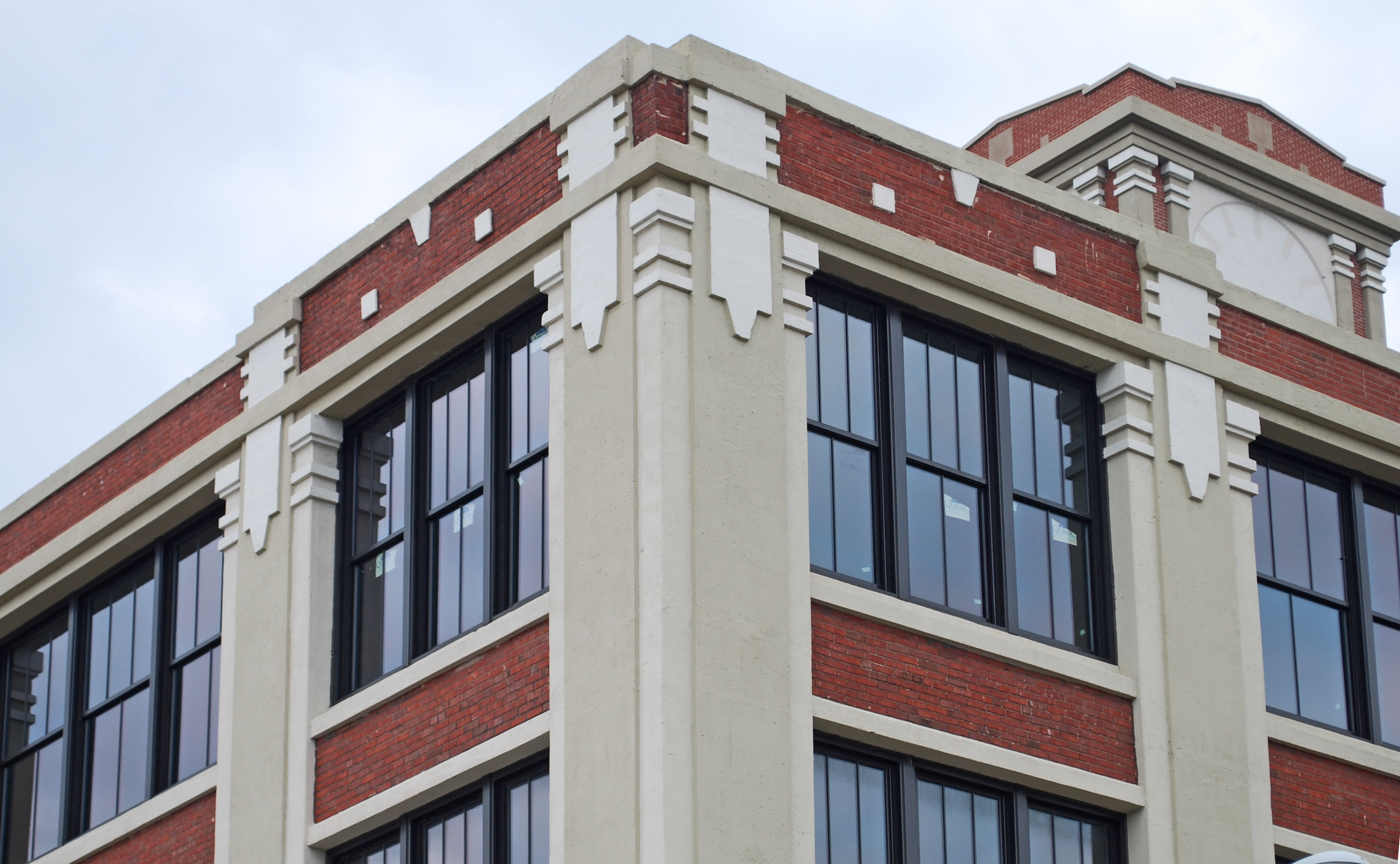
Detail of exterior, top northeast corner, showing ornamental pilaster capitals and decorative insets.

The Vassar Swiss Underwear Company Building is an excellent example of a four-story reinforced concrete industrial loft building, built in two architecturally identical sections that are seamlessly integrated. The original 1913 portion of the building is 160 feet (49 m) by 300 feet (91 m) and the 1923 addition is 103 feet (31 m) by 204 feet; the entire building houses 250,000 square feet. The building is U-shaped in plan, with wings of unequal length backing onto the diagonal railroad track in the rear and flanking a narrow central courtyard.

The reinforced concrete construction can be easily seen in the exterior detailing, with obvious horizontal and vertical elements. Although the building is quite long, architectural emphasis on the vertical pilasters, capping them with stylized Arts and Crafts ornamental detail, de-emphasizes the horizontal dimension of the building. The corner bays are further ornamented with taller pilaster capitals projecting through the parapet, and inset stones above the windows.

The building is topped with a distinctive four-story tower concealing the roof water tank. The tower is constructed of brick, terra cotta, and concrete, and is topped with a stepped parapet. It originally had a clock on each face.
