= Manuel Flores (American politician) =

American politician (born 1972)

Manny Flores
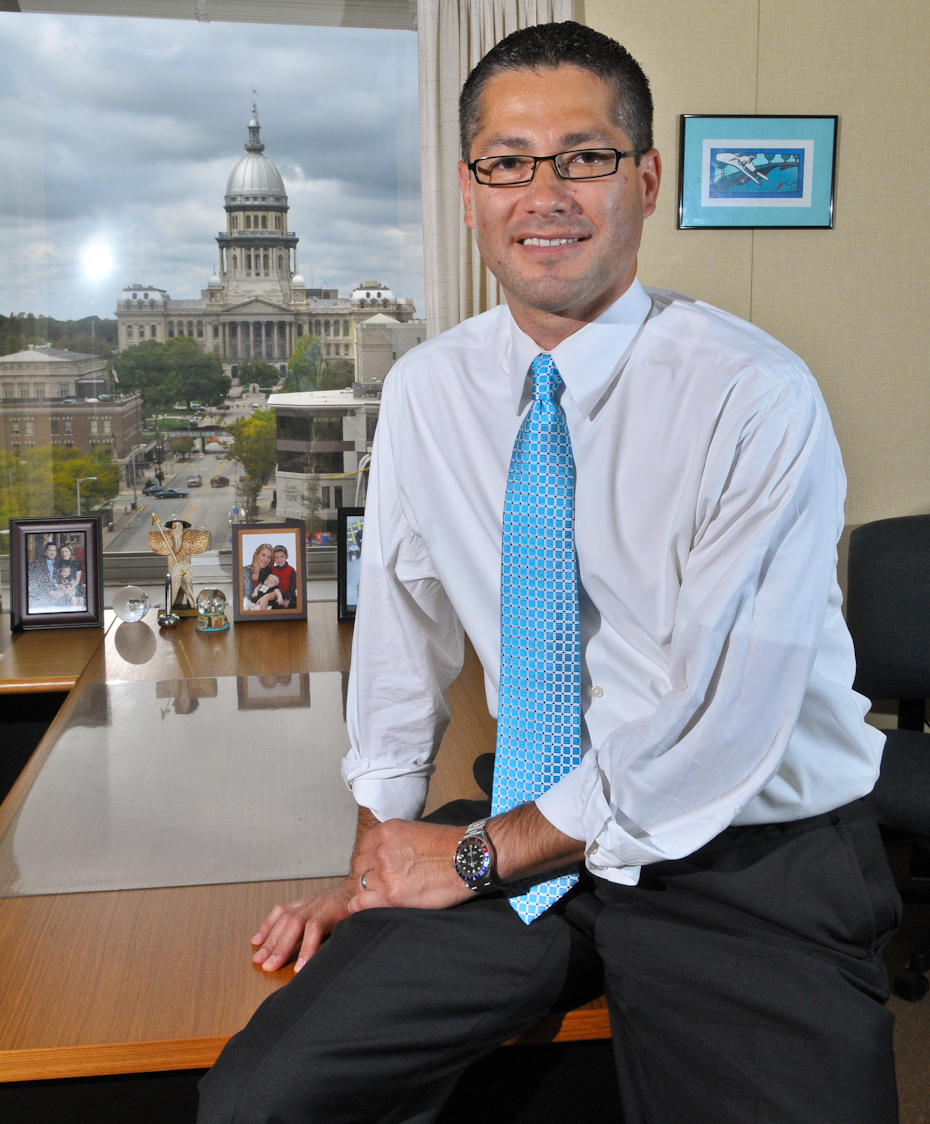

Chairman of the Illinois Commerce Commission (acting)
- In office January 4, 2010 – February 28, 2011
- Preceded by: Charles Box
- Succeeded by: Doug Scott

Member of the Chicago City Council from the 1st Ward
- In office May 19, 2003 – January 4, 2010
- Preceded by: Jesse Granato
- Succeeded by: Proco Joe Moreno

Personal details
- Born: January 21, 1972 (age 54) El Paso, Texas
- Party: Democratic
- Spouse: Georgina
- Children: Two
- Education: Dominican University (B.A.); George Washington University (J.D.)
- Profession: Attorney

Manuel "Manny" Flores (born January 21, 1972) is the Director of the Illinois Department of Financial and Professional Regulation - Division of Banking . A member of the Democratic Party, Flores was elected to the Chicago City Council in 2003. He was the youngest alderman on the Council and represented part of the city's near Northwest Side.

Flores is a noted advocate for government transparency and the development of Chicago's green economy.

== Early life ==
Flores was born in El Paso, Texas, but raised in suburban Northlake, Illinois, where he attended West Leyden High School. He received his bachelor's degree in political science at Dominican University in River Forest, Illinois, and his Juris Doctor degree from George Washington University Law School. At GW Law he was awarded honors for his clinical work on immigration and human rights litigation in political asylum cases. He went on to work as a congressional aide to Luis Gutiérrez and later an assistant state's attorney with the Cook County State's Attorney Office.

== Political career ==
=== Chicago City Council ===
A year and a half after moving to the 1st ward, Flores chose to challenge Daley-backed incumbent Jesse Granato. Flores outpolled Granato in the February primary election. In the April runoff, Flores was elected Alderman with 5,290 to Granato's 3,717.

He served on seven Chicago City Council committees: Economic, Capital and Technology Development; Energy, Environmental Protection and Public Utilities; Historical Landmark Preservation; Rules and Ethics; Parks and Recreation; Special Events and Cultural Affairs; and Transportation and Public Way.

Flores is noted as a champion of sustainability and government transparency, passing several landmark ordinances and initiating programs to develop the region’s green economy.

==== Sustainability Initiatives ====
Flores works on the Addison Industrial Corridor Redevelopment Project, a revitalization plan sponsored by the City of Chicago and the Metropolitan Agency for Planning to redevelop the underutilized planned manufacturing district at the north end of the 1st Ward. Alderman Flores has been working closely with the planning team to realize his vision to create the city’s first green manufacturing district in the Addison Industrial Corridor. The green manufacturing district will leverage retail opportunity and demand for manufacturing created by the nearby Green Exchange and provide jobs for the mixed-income workforce housed at Lathrop Homes. His vision combines a sustainable philosophy with a plan to bring competitive jobs to the ward and retain the neighborhoods socioeconomic diversity.

Flores also sponsors the development of the Green Exchange. He worked closely with Baum Development, LLC, the City of Chicago Zoning Committee, and private businesses to ensure the former factory was not converted into residential condominiums.

Flores has also been developing the Lathrop Homes LEED Neighborhood Development (ND) project with the Chicago Housing Authority (CHA) to create the nation’s first ever LEED certified public housing project. Lathrop Homes, one of the oldest public housing projects in the city, is located in the northeast corner of the 1st Ward, close to the Green Exchange and the Addison Industrial Corridor. Alderman Flores and CHA are working to develop affordable sustainable housing in a transit-oriented development. LEED ND is a sustainability certification in the experimental stages and Lathrop Homes could become the first development in the United States to receive the qualification.

Flores instituted the Building Green in the First Ward program in January 2008. This program requires that all residential and commercial developers who receive a zoning change for new construction projects must participate in the Chicago Green Homes Program. Developers are required to achieve the maximum 3-star certification, ensuring that this new construction is an environmentally friendly, energy-efficient and high-quality project.

==== GreenEconomyChicago.com ====
In May 2009, Alderman Flores launched GreenEconomyChicago.com , a joint website and TV program, to bring everyday citizens into policymaking decisions concerning the development of the green economy in Chicago.

The website and program—a collaborative effort between Alderman Flores, Mike Bueltmann of Clear Content, and Comcast CN 100—features discussion and information pages that will be moderated by experts from academia, the private sector, and government. Moderators will translate these pages into steps individual citizens can take to promote economic development in Chicago based on sustainable practices and values.

GreenEconomyChicago.com seeks to tap into the groundswell of expertise and initiative occurring at the non-governmental level. The site utilizes a Web 2.0 approach to organizing and delivering information, allowing participants to directly provide input and feedback, and enhancing social networks directed at specific policymaking and implementation processes.

==== Transparency Initiatives ====
The TIF Sunshine Ordinance was introduced by Aldermen Flores and Waguespack (32nd Ward) and passed into law on April 22, 2009. The TIF Sunshine Ordinance publishes all documents pertaining to Tax Increment Financing (TIF) district agreements online in a searchable format to be accessed by the public. This important transparency ordinance places information about the City’s expenditure of tax dollars raised in TIF districts that was previously obscured to the public.

Follow on the heels of the TIF Sunshine Ordinance is the City Asset Lease Disclosure Ordinance, introduced by Alderman Flores on May 13, 2009. The ordinance would publish and track documents pertaining to City asset lease agreements worth more than $10 million, such as the leasing of the Chicago Skyway, the Chicago Downtown Public Parking System and the Chicago Parking Meter System. The ordinance would make all documents available online in a searchable format at a single location and provide a single accounting document to track the appropriations, income earner, investments, and future budget distributions generated through the lease of City assets. Currently, information about City lease agreements is available online. However, the information is scattered across several websites in lengthy budget documents. The ordinance would make this information accessible by creating a single accounting document, updated quarterly, on the City of Chicago Department of Finance website to track monies spent and generated in City asset lease agreements.

==== BPA-Free Kids Ordinance ====
In May 2009, Chicago became the first US city to ban the sale of products containing bisphenol A (BPA), a disputed chemical used in many plastics. The Chicago City Council adopted an ordinance proposed by Flores and Alderman Edward M. Burke to ban the sale of baby bottles and cups manufactured with BPA.

=== Campaigns for Higher Office ===
On May 10, 2007, Flores officially announced his candidacy for Congressman Luis Gutierrez's seat for the Democratic nomination for Congress in Illinois' 4th Congressional District. On August 28, 2007, Flores withdrew from the race, due to Gutierrez's decision to seek re-election to the office.

In September 2010, Flores circulated petitions to run for Mayor of Chicago in the 2011 election, but instead chose to endorse Gery Chico, the chairman of City Colleges of Chicago District No. 508.

=== Illinois Commerce Commission ===
On January 4, 2010, Flores was nominated by Illinois Governor Pat Quinn to be the chairman of the Illinois Commerce Commission, replacing Charles Box. After it became clear that Flores would likely not be confirmed by the Illinois Senate, Quinn chose to appoint former Rockford Mayor Doug Scott to the chairmanship and hired Flores to serve as director of banking in the Illinois Department of Financial and Professional Regulation.

== Personal life ==
Flores lives in the Wicker Park neighborhood with his wife, Georgina and two children.
