= Tom McNamara (politician) =

American politician

Thomas McNamara
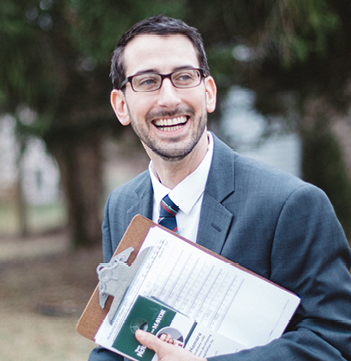

41st Mayor of Rockford
- In office May 2, 2017 – Aug 24, 2026
- Preceded by: Larry Morrissey
- Succeeded by: Janessa Neal (Acting)

Personal details
- Born: March 29, 1983 (age 43) Rockford, Illinois, U.S.
- Party: Democratic
- Spouse: Sarah Ann Reed
- Education: John Carroll University (BS, MS)

Thomas McNamara (born March 29, 1983) is an American politician who served as the 41st mayor of Rockford, Illinois from May 1, 2017 to August 24, 2026. He previously served as an alderman of the Rockford's 3rd ward from 2013 to 2017.

McNamara is a graduate of John Carroll University and has professional experience in the nonprofit and insurance sectors. A member of the Democratic Party, he is the son of former Rockford mayor John McNamara and one of the youngest mayors in the city's history. He was first elected mayor in 2017, re-elected unopposed in 2021, and won a third term in 2025 with 78% of the vote. McNamara announced on July 27, 2026, that he will leave office on August 31 of the same year.

During his tenure, McNamara has prioritized economic development, public safety, infrastructure investment, and neighborhood revitalization. Under his leadership, Rockford saw the expansion of Chicago Rockford International Airport, the development of Hard Rock Casino Rockford, and the implementation of multiple capital improvement programs. He also spearheaded the RE-GROW Grant Program to support minority-owned businesses and oversaw a significant reduction in the city's property tax rate.

McNamara's administration has been noted for launching public health and housing initiatives during the COVID-19 pandemic, including expanded services for unhoused residents and financial relief for small businesses. He has also emphasized transparency, police reform, and domestic violence prevention through initiatives such as the Family Peace Center and the Mayor's Office on Domestic and Human Trafficking Prevention.

== Early life and education ==
Thomas Patrick McNamara was born on March 29, 1983, in Rockford, Illinois. He is the youngest son of John McNamara, who served as Rockford's mayor from 1981 to 1989. McNamara graduated from Boylan Catholic High School and went on to earn both a B.S. in sociology and criminology and an M.S. in nonprofit administration from John Carroll University in University Heights, Ohio.

While at John Carroll, he interned at community-based correctional facilities and worked in the Washington, D.C. office of U.S. Senator Dick Durbin.

== Early career ==
Prior to entering politics, McNamara served in nonprofit and private sectors. He worked as a career development specialist at Goodwill Industries of Northern Illinois, where he wrote grants to support people with disabilities. He also built a multimillion-dollar client portfolio while working at Eckburg Insurance Group.

In April 2013, McNamara was elected as the 3rd Ward Alderman in Rockford City Council, defeating three-term Republican incumbent Doug Mark and independent Maurice West in a competitive race for the ward, representing both east and west sides and downtown. During his four-year tenure, he sponsored legislation aimed at neighborhood investment, public safety, and fiscal efficiency.

On April 4, 2017, McNamara won a landslide victory, winning just over 68% of votes cast for four mayoral candidates.

== Mayoralty ==
McNamara was elected as the 41st mayor of Rockford, Illinois, on April 4, 2017, and officially took office on May 1, 2017. At 34, he became one of the youngest mayors in Rockford's history. The son of former Rockford mayor John McNamara, he ran on a platform emphasizing public safety, economic development, and neighborhood investment. After his election, McNamara retained most existing department heads while naming key advisors, including a chief of staff and heads of community outreach.

In the April 2021 election, McNamara ran unopposed, securing a second term without opposition. In the 2025 mayoral election, McNamara faced an independent challenger, Derrick Kunz, and won decisively with approximately 78% of the vote.

=== Policing ===
Under Mayor McNamara's leadership, Rockford saw significant improvements in public safety metrics. Between 2016 and 2023, violent crime in the city declined by approximately 34%, while property crime fell by nearly 29%. In 2023, Rockford recorded its lowest violent crime rate in five years, with a 19% decrease compared to 2022. Juvenile arrests also saw a significant reduction, falling by 27% between 2023 and 2024. Meanwhile, the homicide clearance rate rose sharply, reaching 85%, well above national averages.

McNamara's administration substantially increased funding for law enforcement, with the police department's budget expanding by over 40% during his tenure. This financial boost supported the deployment of advanced technology tools, including ShotSpotter gunshot detection systems, automated license plate readers, and an expanded rollout of body-worn cameras to improve transparency and accountability.

Beyond enforcement, McNamara prioritized community-based violence prevention and intervention programs. The Family Peace Center, launched under his administration, serves as a comprehensive resource for survivors of domestic violence, offering legal, counseling, and shelter services. Other initiatives supported include the Barbershop Project, which uses trusted community spaces for outreach and education, and the Violence Prevention Response Team (VPRT), which focuses on crisis intervention and connecting at-risk individuals to services.

In 2022, McNamara spearheaded the launch of the Crisis Co‑Response Team (CCRT) in Rockford. Partnering with local behavioral health agencies, the CCRT was designed to respond to mental health emergencies with specialized, non-police interventions. This initiative aimed to provide more appropriate, compassionate care to individuals in crisis, reduce unnecessary law enforcement involvement, and improve overall public safety outcomes.

=== Capital improvements ===
During Tom McNamara's tenure as mayor, Rockford undertook its infrastructure investment agenda in city history, marked by a series of multi-year Capital Improvement Programs (CIPs). In December 2023, the Rockford City Council unanimously approved a five-year, $322 million capital plan focused on upgrading key streets—including Madison, Whitman, Church/Main, and 11th Street—as well as bridges, sidewalks, stormwater systems, and multiuse paths. This plan represented the largest infrastructure investment ever undertaken by the city.

Following this, in December 2024, the City Council approved the subsequent five-year Capital Improvement Program for 2025–2029, allocating approximately $343.5 million. This plan continued to prioritize major corridor reconstructions such as 11th Street and Madison Street, bridge replacements, the construction of a new water treatment plant, and significant enhancements to stormwater management and active transportation infrastructure.

=== Economic development ===
McNamara spearheaded several major development projects aimed at bolstering Rockford's economy and reducing the tax burden on residents.

In June 2019, the Illinois Gaming Board approved Hard Rock Casino Rockford, the first license issued under new state gaming laws. A temporary casino opened in late 2021, followed by construction of the permanent 175,000-square-foot facility in spring 2022 at the former Clock Tower Resort site. By its August 2024 opening, the project had created approximately 1,200 construction and 1,000 permanent jobs, generating millions in municipal revenue that have supported initiatives like McNamara's Rockford Promise scholarship program.

Simultaneously, the Chicago Rockford International Airport (RFD) experienced rapid growth. Through McNamara's regional advocacy and partnerships with carriers like UPS Airlines, Amazon Air, and Maersk, RFD increased its workforce from around 4,800 employees in 2017 to over 8,500 by 2024. The airport also rated as the 14th busiest cargo airport in the U.S. by landed weight in 2024—handling more than 3.1 billion pounds, a 1.5% increase over the previous year—and set passenger records with 262,432 travelers in 2024.

In 2024, McNamara introduced the RE‑GROW Grant Program, funded by the city’s 3% cannabis sales tax, to support minority-owned and community-focused small businesses and nonprofits. The program, whose name stands for Reinvest, Energize, Give, Restore Opportunity, Win, allocated $500,000 in its inaugural year to initiatives promoting youth development, violence prevention, and community revitalization—addressing equity gaps in local entrepreneurship and community support.

On fiscal policy, McNamara secured the passage of balanced annual budgets each year of his tenure while substantially lowering residential tax rates from 3.31% in 2017 to about 1.93% by 2025. He simultaneously streamlined city operations, eliminated back-office waste, and directed new revenue streams—including casino proceeds and airport lease fees—into community priorities without raising taxes.

=== Social services and housing ===
In January 2018, recognizing the growing threat of human trafficking, McNamara established the Mayor's Office on Domestic and Human Trafficking Prevention. This office was launched alongside the opening of the Family Peace Center, a comprehensive resource hub aimed at supporting victims of domestic violence and trafficking, providing crucial services such as counseling, legal assistance, and emergency shelter.

The onset of the COVID-19 pandemic in 2020 posed significant challenges to vulnerable populations in Rockford, particularly those experiencing homelessness. Under McNamara's leadership, the city expanded its outreach and support services for unhoused residents. This included innovative partnerships with local hotels to provide emergency shelter options, helping reduce the risk of virus spread among this at-risk group. The administration also collaborated closely with Winnebago County officials to develop longer-term housing strategies, emphasizing stable and supportive housing solutions as part of a coordinated regional response.

=== COVID-19 response ===
In March 2020, as the COVID-19 pandemic rapidly escalated, McNamara declared a citywide state of emergency, enabling the city to implement swift public health measures. These included suspending water shutoffs to ensure uninterrupted access for all households, closing public buildings, and transitioning many city services to remote or online formats to reduce in-person contact. To protect city employees, McNamara authorized 14 days of paid sick leave for staff affected by COVID-19 and facilitated remote work by providing necessary equipment, helping maintain essential city operations during the crisis.

Recognizing the severe economic impact of the pandemic, McNamara took proactive steps to support Rockford’s local businesses. In May 2020, his administration waived multiple fees for small business owners as part of the state's phased reopening plan. This included suspending seating permits and expediting liquor license approvals to help restaurants and bars recover. Additionally, as Liquor Commissioner, McNamara temporarily allowed bars and restaurants to sell packaged alcohol for curbside pickup, delivery, and to-go sales.

McNamara emphasized a data-driven approach in guiding the city's reopening. In May 2020, Rockford prepared to reopen most businesses—including restaurants, childcare facilities, and places of worship—on June 1, based on public health metrics and input from advisory committees.

Throughout the pandemic, the administration collaborated closely with Winnebago County officials to align public health messaging, establish vaccination sites, and distribute personal protective equipment to frontline workers and vulnerable populations.

Understanding the pandemic’s disproportionate effect on vulnerable groups, McNamara expanded outreach and support for unhoused residents by partnering with local hotels to provide emergency shelter options. The city also worked with county officials on longer-term housing strategies to ensure stable, supportive living arrangements. Leveraging federal CARES Act funding in 2021, his administration launched a small business grant program aimed at preserving jobs and sustaining Rockford’s commercial vitality amid ongoing economic disruptions.

== Personal life ==
McNamara currently resides in the Churchill's Grove neighborhood with his wife, Sarah Ann Reed, and their two children. McNamara frequently emphasizes community dedication instilled by his parents and credits his experience at John Carroll for shaping his values. In his free time, McNamara noted in enjoys the Rockford metro's recreational amenities, including its many golf courses.

Political offices
Preceded by Larry Morrissey	Mayor of Rockford, Illinois; 2017–present	Succeeded by incumbent
