= Manuel Flores =

Manuel Flores may refer to:

- Manuel N. Flores (1801–1868), volunteer in the Texas army
- Manuel Flores Mora (1923–1984), Uruguayan journalist and politician
- Manuel Flores (basketball) (born 1951), Spanish Olympic basketball player
- Manuel Flores (Salvadoran politician) (born 1965), 2024 Salvadoran presidential candidate
- Manuel Flores (American politician) (born 1972), member of the Chicago City Council
- Manuel Pérez Flores (born 1980), Mexican footballer who played as a midfielder
