= John Cabello =

American politician

Member of the Illinois House of Representatives from the 90th district
- Incumbent
- Assumed office January 11, 2023
- Preceded by: Tom Demmer (redistricted)

Member of the Illinois House of Representatives from the 68th district
- In office August 10, 2012 – January 13, 2021
- Preceded by: Dave Winters
- Succeeded by: David Vella

Personal details
- Party: Republican
- Education: Rock Valley College
- Occupation: Police detective

John M. Cabello is an American politician who has served as a Republican member of the Illinois House of Representatives representing the 90th district since 2022. He previously represented the 68th district, which included all or parts of Rockford, Machesney Park, Loves Park and Cherry Valley, from 2012 until 2021.

He was a member of the Winnebago County Board and the Harlem Township Board before being appointed to the House. He was sworn in on August 10, 2012. During the 2016 U.S. presidential election, Cabello was a co-chair of the Illinois Trump Victory Committee, supporting Republican candidate Donald Trump. During the COVID-19 pandemic, Cabello wrote an op-ed arguing that prisoners "who are elderly and medically vulnerable, and those with pathways to release" should not be rehoused into empty hotel rooms for isolation purposes. He called on the governor to oppose a related civil rights lawsuit. After being reelected three times, he lost his 2020 reelection bid by 239 votes to Democratic candidate David Vella.

In the 2021 decennial reapportionment, Cabello's home was drawn into the 90th district. The 90th district consists of northern Winnebago County, including portions of Rockford, and northern Stephenson County, including a majority of Freeport. In the 2022 Republican primary election, Cabello defeated Mark W. Szula, the village president of Roscoe, by a nearly three-to-one margin. In the 2022 general election, he was unopposed. He took office on January 11, 2023.
