= Edolo J. Giorgi =

American politician

Zeke Giorgi
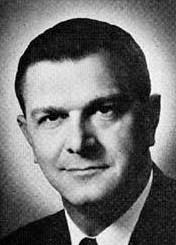

Member of the Illinois House of Representatives
- In office January 1965 – October 1993
- Preceded by: At large district created
- Succeeded by: Paula J. Raschke-Lind
- Constituency: 67th district (1993); 68th district (1983–1993); 34th district (1967–1983); At-large (1965–1967)

Personal details
- Born: Edolo J. Giogri; September 5, 1921 Rockford, Illinois, U.S.
- Died: October 24, 1993 (aged 72) Rockford, Illinois, U.S.
- Party: Democratic
- Spouse: Josephine
- Children: 3
- Relatives: David Vella (grandson)
- Education: Washington and Lee University
- Profession: Legislator

Military service
- Allegiance: United States
- Branch/service: United States Army
- Rank: Sergeant
- Battles/wars: World War II

Edolo J. "Zeke" Giorgi (September 5, 1921 – October 24, 1993) was an American politician.

== Early life ==
Born in Rockford, Illinois, Giorgi served in the United States Army during World War II and then went to Washington and Lee University. During World War II, he served forty months as an Orientation Sergeant in Armored Corps (Tanks) and Amphibious. After the war, he served as the Deputy Assessor for Rockford Township. In 1950, he left the assessor's office and became a steward with I.B.E.W. Local 196. In 1955, he was elected to the Rockford City Council as alderman for the city's fifth ward. He served for three terms, choosing not to seek reelection in 1967.

== Illinois House of Representatives ==
The 1960 reapportionment process was stalled by partisan gridlock. Subsequently, the Illinois Supreme Court ordered an at large election for all 177 members of the Illinois House in 1964. Voters were given ballots three feet long. Giorgi was one of the winning 177 candidates that year. After a 1965 Illinois Supreme Court Case to resolve the redistricting issue, Giorgi's home was drawn into the 34th district, which consisted of southern Winnebago County. He was reelected as one of the district's three representatives alongside Republicans David W. Johnson and Frank P. North. His Rockford based district was renumbered several times. After the Cutback Amendment mandated single-member districts, he became the representative for the 68th district. In the Republican-controlled redistricting of 1991, he was moved to the 67th district.

During his time in office, Giorgi sponsored legislation that authorized the state to conduct a lottery and thereafter was known as the "Father of the Illinois State Lottery". He was a proponent of legalized gambling including riverboats and “Vegas Nights” for nonprofit organizations, but rarely if ever gambled himself. He was also credited with Rockford area developments, including the BMO Harris Bank Center, the University of Illinois College of Medicine campus, the regional State of Illinois Office Building, the Belvidere Assembly Plant, and a legal clinic run by the Northern Illinois University College of Law. He prided himself on his constituent services and was known to pay their parking tickets on occasion to create the illusion of influence. Giorgi died in office October 24, 1993, of a heart attack. He was survived by his wife Josephine and their three daughters. At the time of his death, he was the House's longest serving member. His legislative aide Paula J. Raschke-Lind was appointed on November 24, 1994, to take Giorgi's place in the Illinois General Assembly.
