= Litesa Wallace =

American politician

Member of the Illinois House of Representatives from the 67th district
- In office August 4, 2014 – January 9, 2019
- Preceded by: Charles E. Jefferson
- Succeeded by: Maurice West

Personal details
- Born: 1978 (age 47–48) Chicago, Illinois, U.S.
- Party: Democratic
- Education: Western Illinois University (BA); Northern Illinois University (MA, PhD)

Litesa E. Wallace (born 1978) is an American politician who served as a member of the Illinois House of Representatives for the 67th district from August 2014 to January 2019.

== Early life and education ==
Wallace was born in Chicago. She earned a Bachelor of Arts degree from Western Illinois University, followed by a Master of Arts in marriage and family counseling and a Ph.D. in educational psychology from Northern Illinois University.

== Career ==
=== Illinois House of Representatives ===
Wallace was appointed to the Illinois House of Representatives in August 2014 by the Winnebago County Democratic Party, succeeding Charles E. Jefferson. Wallace had previously served as chief of staff to Jefferson.

=== 2018 Illinois gubernatorial campaign and aftermath ===
Wallace ran for lieutenant governor of Illinois in the 2018 Democratic primary alongside State Senator Daniel Biss, replacing Biss's initial pick, Chicago alderman Carlos Ramirez-Rosa. In a video announcing the joint ticket, Wallace commented that she and Biss had both "fought for childcare assistance, a $15 minimum wage, to expand healthcare, and to make millionaires pay their fair share." Biss and Wallace lost the Democratic primary to J. B. Pritzker and his running mate Juliana Stratton.

In the 2020 Democratic presidential primary, Wallace was a supporter of Bernie Sanders' 2020 presidential campaign.

=== 2022 congressional election ===
In November 2021, Wallace declared her candidacy for Illinois's 17th congressional district in the 2022 election.
