= Charles E. Jefferson =

American politician (1945–2025)

Charles Jefferson

Member of the Illinois House of Representatives from the 67th district
- In office April 2001 – July 2014
- Preceded by: Doug Scott
- Succeeded by: Litesa Wallace

Personal details
- Born: March 31, 1945 Waco, Texas, U.S.
- Died: January 10, 2025 (aged 79)
- Party: Democratic
- Spouse: Genell (m. 1967; died 2001)
- Children: 3
- Parent(s): Lee Andrew Jefferson (father); Victoria Earline Burton (mother)
- Education: Paul Quinn College
- Profession: Full Time Legislator

Military service
- Allegiance: United States
- Branch/service: United States Army
- Years of service: 1965–1971
- Rank: Sergeant
- Unit: Military Police

Charles E. Jefferson (March 31, 1945 – January 10, 2025) was an American politician who served as a Democratic member of the Illinois House of Representatives, representing 67th District from April 2001 to July 2014. He served as Assistant Majority Leader. He resigned from the Illinois House of Representatives July 1, 2014. He was a member of the Winnebago County Board prior to serving as a State Representative. On January 10, 2025, it was announced that he had died at the age of 79.

== Biography ==
Born into a family Lee Andrew Jefferson (1914-1989) and Victoria Earline Burton (1922-?), in Waco, Texac, U.S.
