= Green Exchange =

- U.S. National Register of Historic Places
- Chicago Landmark
- LEED Platinum
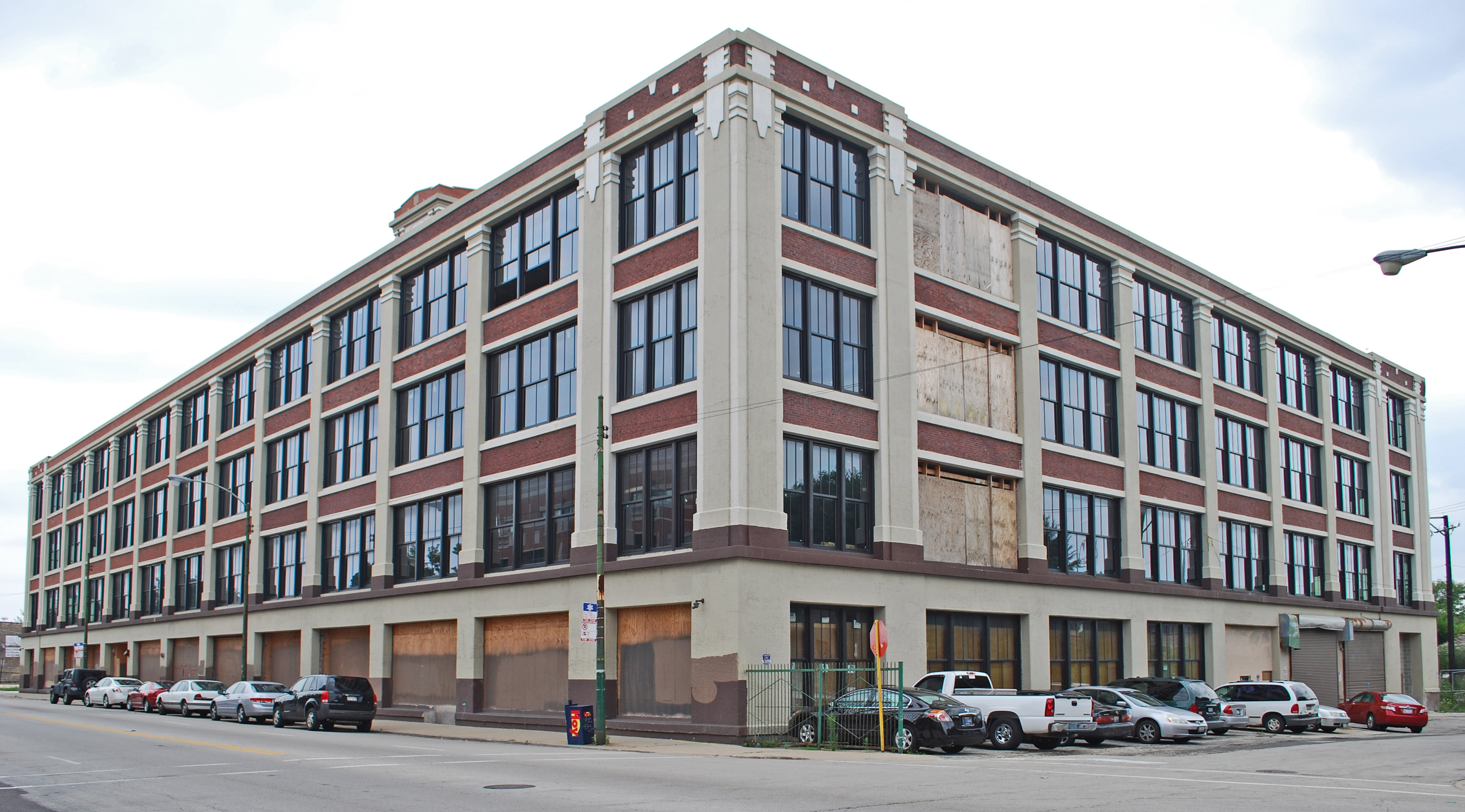
- Facade from northwest

- Location within Illinois
- Location: 2545 W. Diversey Ave., Chicago, Illinois
- Coordinates: 41°55′56″N 87°41′35″W
- Built: 1914
- Architect: Lawrence G. Hallberg, Sr.; Lawrence G. Hallberg, Jr.
- NRHP reference No.: 07000859

Significant dates
- Added to NRHP: September 17, 2008
- Designated CHICL: July 30, 2008
- Designated LEED: May 2013

The Green Exchange is a sustainable and green retail and office development project in the Logan Square community area of Chicago, Illinois that is designed to house eco-friendly businesses and organizations. Developers of the building have been awarded LEED Platinum status for their rehabilitation of a historic landmark four-story manufacturing facility originally built in 1914. The retail and office space is open to the public and is intended to serve as an important Midwest destination for green consumers.

== History ==
Green Exchange occupies the former Frederick Cooper Lamp Company building, built in 1914, and originally home to the Vassar Swiss Underwear Company. Cooper bought the building in 1967 and in 2005, relocated to China. In 2004, Cooper announced it was closing down the factory in Chicago. In order to keep the building from being turned into condominiums, the Logan Square Neighborhood Association (LSNA), a grass-roots community organization, organized neighbors, veteran Cooper workers, and the U.S. Green Building Council to form the Cooper Lamps Task Force. As Cooper began to lay off workers during the summer of 2005, the Task Force negotiated for severance benefits from the owners and applied for enhanced job-training from the city. With the support of 1st Ward Alderman Manuel Flores for a jobs-focused use for the plant, the building was sold to Baum Development, LLC, a triple bottom line commercial developer who agreed to pursue a use for the building that would create jobs.

Baum Development worked with the Commission on Chicago Landmarks and the National Park Service to win landmark protection for the building. Ninety-six percent of the original building structure was rehabilitated and maintained to preserve this landmark structure.

Three times larger than the Jean Vollum Natural Capital Center in Portland, OR, Green Exchange is the country's largest sustainable business community. According to David Baum, one of the developers, "In order to be a tenant in Green Exchange, you must be doing something to advance the green marketplace." Chicago Mayor Richard M. Daley has described the project as "a great example of the public-private partnerships that are working together to help make Chicago one of the most environmentally friendly cities in the nation."

== Building ==
Green Exchange is located at 2545 West Diversey Avenue alongside the Kennedy Expressway, from which the building's iconic four story clock tower can be seen. The tower underwent significant rehabilitation in 2008 to restore the façade's original architectural ornamentation.

The building's conversion has been headed by Hartshorne Plunkard Architecture. The first and second floors have retail stores and showrooms while the third and fourth floors are for shared and individual office spaces. Additional tenant amenities include bike rooms, showers and environmentally friendly meeting and event space.

The 272,000-square-foot (25,300 m^{2}), four-story building is U-shaped, divided into two wings separated by a courtyard. This layout allows natural light to penetrate from more than 600 windows that surround the building. The roof of the parking structure features a 8,041-square-foot (747.0 m^{2}) sky garden that is accessible from the second floor. Rain is collected in a 41,329-gallon cistern underneath the ground floor and used to irrigate plants and grass on the roof and the working organic garden at grade level.

The building lowers utility costs in part due to a building envelope consisting of highly insulated walls and roofs combined with 600 high performance windows. The escalator slows down when no one is using it, thereby reducing energy usage by as much as 30 percent when compared to standard models.

A computerized Intelli-Building Automated Building Controls System with over five miles of wire and conduit controls the energy efficient HVAC mechanical system that allows for individualized control of tenant spaces and increased occupant comfort. CO_{2} sensors and motion sensors in each of the 250 plus comfort zones ensure the tenants are breathing fresh air, along with saving energy. Variable speed frequency drives (VFDs) control every pump and blower motor averaging a 30% savings over conventional systems. Building engineers operate the building via laptops and tablets thru standard web browsers.

Non-toxic construction materials and coatings improve the indoor air quality.

== Features ==
The Green Exchange has a variety of features, including a sky garden, an on-site restaurant, an expansive meeting & event space, a rooftop apiary featuring five beehives, and an adjacent urban farm that provides food for the on-site restaurant and tenants of the building.

== Awards ==
- LEED Platinum Certification, established by the U.S. Green Building Council (USGBC) and verified by the Green Building Certification Institute (GBCI).
- National Historic Landmark Status was awarded in 2007 for having met all National Park Service guidelines for historic rehabilitation, thereby placing the building on the National Register of Historic Places.
- Chicago Landmark Status designated by the City of Chicago on July 30, 2008.
- Bruce Abrams Award given in 2012 by the Chicago Association of Realtors. The highest honor presented at the Good Neighbor Awards, awarded for "quality construction, service to a special population, green benefits, market value and architectural significance".
- Merit Award for Commercial Design and Landscape, awarded in 2013 by the American Society of Landscape Architects (ASLA).
- Outstanding For-Profit Neighborhood Real Estate Project Award, won at the 2013 Chicago Neighborhood Development Awards (CNDA).
- Preservation Excellence Award: Exterior Rehabilitation and Adaptive Reuse awarded for the rehabilitation and reuse of the former Vassar Swiss Underwear Co. Building into the Green Exchange. Given by the Commission on Chicago Landmarks at the 2014 Chicago Landmark Awards for Preservation Excellence, in recognition of the project's "exceptional commitment to Chicago's historic architecture".
