= Paula J. Raschke-Lind =

American politician

Member of the Illinois House of Representatives from the 67th district
- In office October 1993 – 1994
- Preceded by: Edolo J. Giorgi
- Succeeded by: Douglas P. Scott

Personal details
- Born: Paula Raschke-Lind; December 18, 1962 (age 63) Manitowoc, Wisconsin
- Party: Democratic
- Education: Rock Valley College (AA)

Paula J. Raschke-Lind (born December 18, 1962) is an American politician who served as a Democratic member of the Illinois House of Representatives from 1993 to 1994.

== Biography ==
Born in Manitowoc, Wisconsin, Raschke-Lind received her associate degree from Rock Valley College. She lived in Rockford, Illinois and was a legislative aide to Illinois state representative Edolo J. Giorgi. Raschke-Lind was appointed to the Illinois House of Representatives when Giorgi died. Raschke-Lind is a Democrat. She lost the 1994 Democratic primary to Doug Scott, who went on to win the November general election.
