= List of mayors of Rockford, Illinois =

This is a list of mayors of Rockford, Illinois, United States.

== One-year terms: 1852–1881 ==
- Willard Wheeler 1852–1853
- Hiram R. Maynard 1853–1854
- Ulysses M. Warner 1854–1855
- Edward Vaughn 1855–1856
- James L. Loop 1856–1857
- William Brown 1857–1858
- Seeley Perry 1858–1859
- Charles Williams 1859–1864
- Albert Fowler 1864–1866, 1867–1868
- Edward H. Baker 1866–1867, 1868–1869
- Seymour G. Bronson 1869–1873
- Gilbert Woodruff 1873–1875
- Robert H. Tinker 1875–1876
- Levi Rhoades 1876–1877
- Duncan Ferguson 1877–1878
- William Watson 1878–1879
- Sylvester B. Wilkins 1879–1881

== Two-year terms: 1881–1937 ==
- Samuel P. Crawford 1881–1883
- Alfred Taggart 1883–1887
- Horace C. Scovill 1887–1889
- John H. Sherratt 1889–1891
- Henry N. Starr 1891–1893
- Amasa Hutchins 1893–1895, 1901–1903
- Edward W. Brown 1895–1901, son of former mayor William Brown
- Charles E. Jackson 1903–1907
- Mark Jardine 1907–1911
- William Bennett 1911–1917
- Robert Rew 1917–1921
- J. Herman Hallstrom 1921–1927, 1929–1933
- Burt M. Allen 1927–1929
- C. Henry Bloom 1933–1937

== Four-year terms: 1937–present ==
Image	Mayor	Years	Notes
	Charles F. Brown	1937–1941	
	C. Henry Bloom	1941–1953	
	Milton A. Lundstrom	1953–1957	
	Benjamin T. Schleicher	1957–1973	
	Robert McGaw	1973–1981	
	John McNamara	1981–1989	
	Charles Box	1989–2001	first African American mayor of Rockford
	Douglas P. Scott	2001–2005	
	Lawrence J. "Larry" Morrissey	2005–2017	
	Thomas McNamara	2017–2026	
	Janessa Neal	2026-present	Acting mayor 2nd African American mayor and first woman mayor.

== See also ==
- Rockford history
