= Albert Fowler =

American pioneer and politician

Mayor of Rockford, Illinois
- In office 1864–1866
- Preceded by: Charles Williams
- Succeeded by: Edward H. Baker
- In office 1867–1868
- Preceded by: Edward H. Baker
- Succeeded by: Seymour G. Bronson

Personal details
- Born: September 7, 1802 Tyringham, Massachusetts
- Died: April 12, 1883 (aged 80) Rockford, Illinois
- Occupation: Pioneer, clerk, justice of the peace

Albert Fowler (September 7, 1802 – April 12, 1883) was an American pioneer and politician.

Fowler was born to Elijah Fowler and his wife in Tyringham, Massachusetts. After his father's death, Fowler's mother and his family moved to Chautauqua County, New York.

In 1832 Fowler moved to Chicago, where he stayed briefly before moving to Milwaukee, Wisconsin, on November 18, 1833. There he worked as a clerk for Solomon Juneau. As there were few white settlers yet in the area, Fowler learned the Potawatomi and Menominee languages. His Native American acquaintances knew him as Mis-kee-o-quoneu, or "Red Cap," for his preferred head covering.

Fowler was appointed as the first clerk for the newly formed Milwaukee County in 1835. At the same time, he was made a justice of the peace. He was a member of the second (and only successful) Wisconsin state constitutional convention in 1847. Fowler moved to the town of Wauwatosa in 1839.

In 1856, Fowler moved to Rockford, Illinois, where he lived until his death. While living in Rockford, he served as its mayor for three terms.
