= John Forsyth (clothier) =

Canadian shirtmaker

John Forsyth was a Canadian shirtmaker. He founded the John Forsyth Shirt Company. In 2013 the company was expected to cease Canadian manufacturing due to changes in legislation.

Forsyth established his shirtmaking business in 1903 the small town of Kitchener, Ontario. John Forsyth Shirt Company, Ltd. does business as Forsyth of Canada and has manufactured shirts in Canada and abroad. Products include shirts, knits, and fleece for men, women and youth as well as ties and ladies sports wear. The business is a subsidiary of Forsyth Holdings, Inc.

The Forsyth family began its clothing business in Waterloo, Ontario in 1903 and with manufacturing at Duke and Young streets in downtown Kitchener for 88 years. The family sold the business to Dylex Ltd. of Toronto in 1973. It has had several ownership changes since. Women's clothes were branded under the Lady Forsyth label. In 2005, Forsyth bought out PremiumWear Inc.(Munsingwear), a knit, woven, sportwear, accessories and specialty clothing maker dating to 1886 and headquartered in Minnetonka, Minnesota.

The Kitchener plant closed in 1991 and production was moved to the former Penmans plant in Cambridge, Canada. Penmans is owned by the same parent company. The Cambridge plant once employed about 500 people and produced hundreds of thousands of shirts in a year.

As of 2013, the company sought bankruptcy protection and its principal shareholders were Morante and Harris H. Hester of Connecticut.
