= Charles Box =

American politician (born 1951)

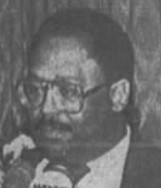

37th Mayor of Rockford, Illinois
- In office 1989–2001
- Preceded by: John McNamara
- Succeeded by: Doug Scott

Personal details
- Born: February 24, 1951 (age 75) Rockford, Illinois, U.S.
- Party: Democratic

Charles Box (born February 24, 1951) is an American politician who served as the first African-American mayor of Rockford, Illinois, then the second largest city in Illinois.

Box was elected mayor of Rockford in 1989, defeating Leonard LaPasso with 63% of the vote and sweeping all 14 wards. A Democrat, Box was the first African-American Mayor elected in Rockford. He was sworn in on April 24, 1989.

Box was elected to three terms as mayor before choosing not to run in 2001. In 2006, Illinois Governor Rod Blagojevich appointed Box as head of the Illinois Commerce Commission.

== See also ==
- List of first African-American mayors

Preceded by John McNamara	Mayor of Rockford, IL; 1989–2001	Succeeded by Doug Scott
