= Larry Morrissey =

American politician

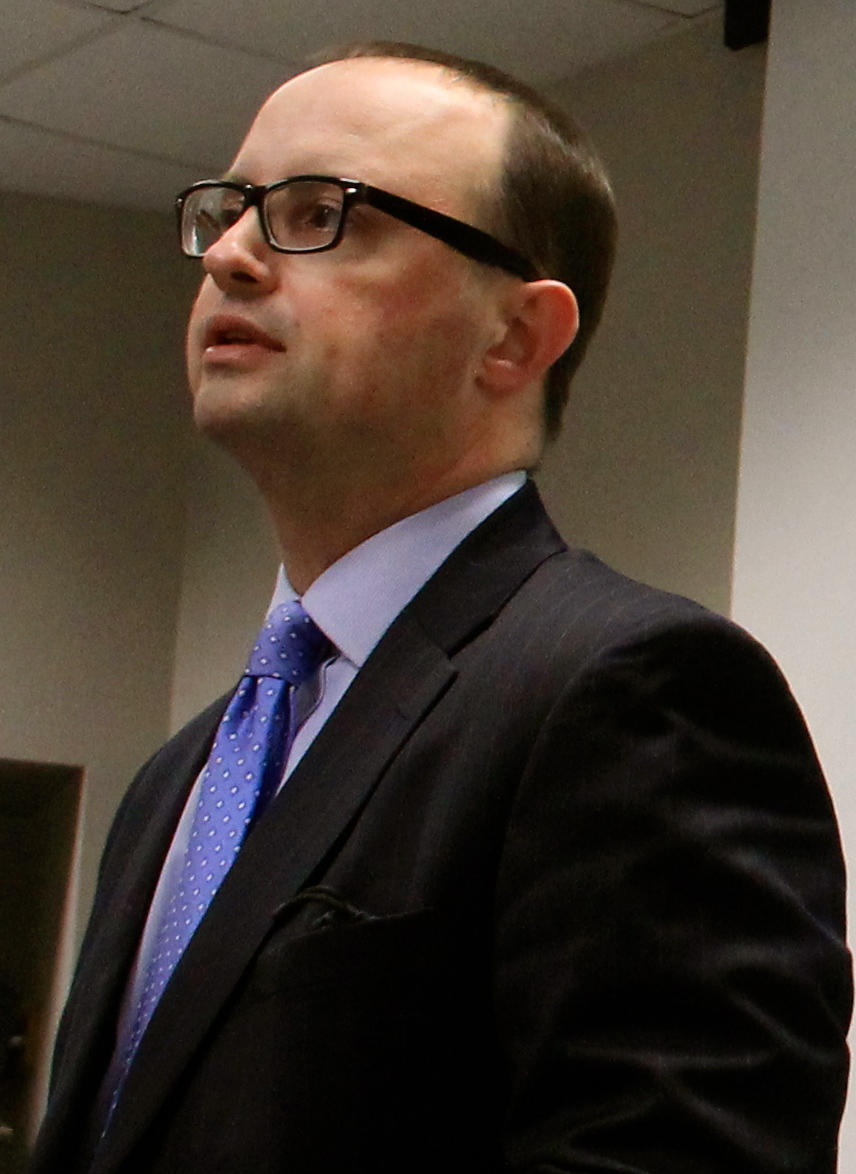

39th Mayor of Rockford, Illinois
- In office May 2005 – May 2017
- Preceded by: Doug Scott
- Succeeded by: Tom McNamara

Personal details
- Born: September 4, 1969 (age 57) Rockford, Illinois, U.S.
- Party: Independent
- Spouse: Stacy Hedrick
- Children: Four
- Education: University of Notre Dame (B.A.); University of Illinois (J.D.)

Lawrence J. Morrissey (born September 4, 1969) is an American politician who served as Mayor of Rockford, Illinois from 2005 until 2017.

In 2001, Morrissey ran for Mayor against Doug Scott, a Democratic member of the Illinois House of Representatives. The Rockford Observer recalled his campaign centered on road improvements, education reforms, lower taxes, and a revitalized downtown. In his second attempt in the 2005 election, Morrissey defeated Scott. In 2017, Morrissey did not run for re-election.

As of 2019, he was Vice President of Government Relations and Vice President of Sales Midwest Region for Marathon Health.

== Political Positions ==
=== Police & Crime ===
As Mayor, Morrissey held a tough-on-crime stance, yet felt strongly against the use of excessive police force.

Political offices
Preceded by Doug Scott	Mayor of Rockford, Illinois; 2005–2017	Succeeded by Tom McNamara
