= Vassarette =

Women's underwear brand

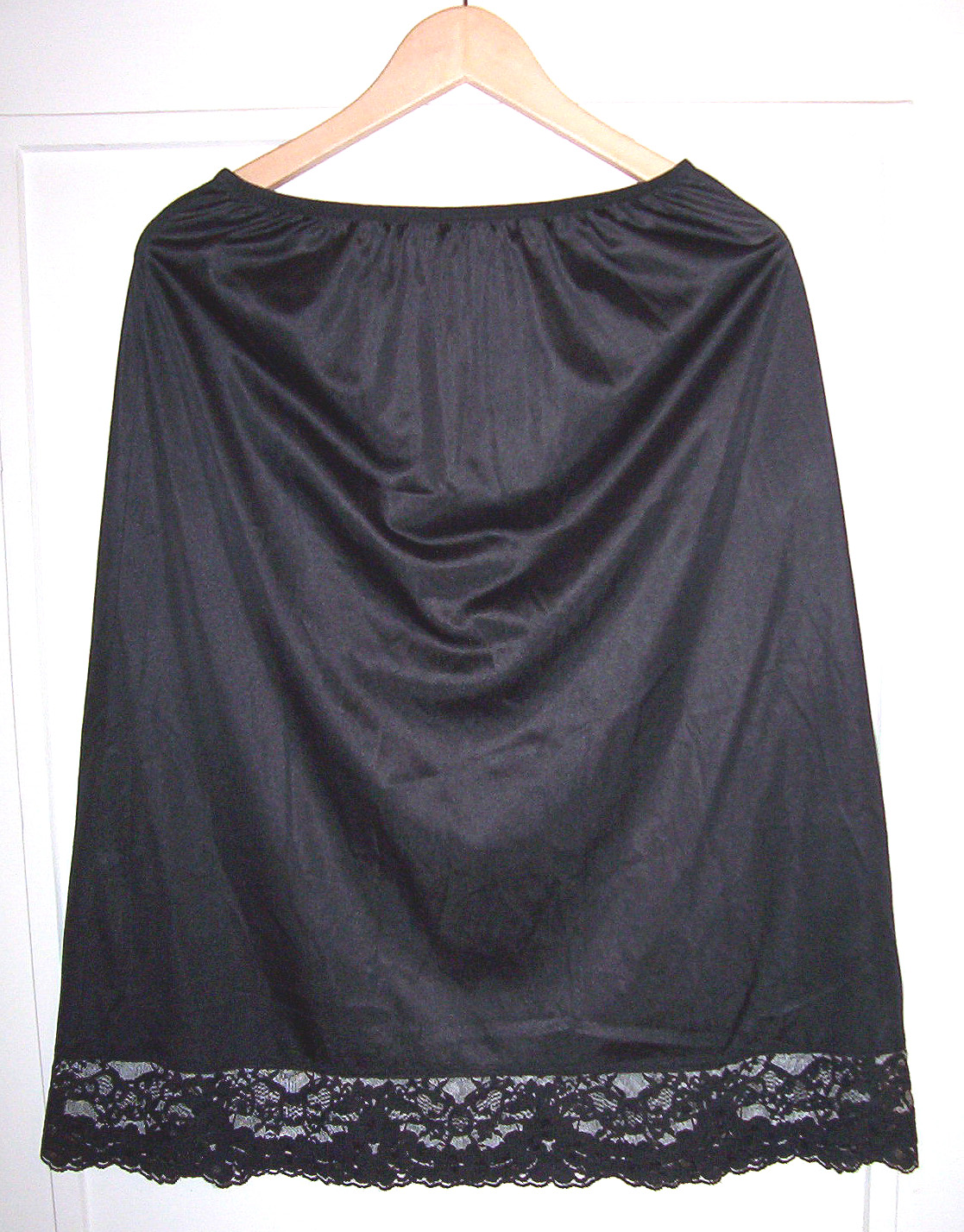
A Vassarette vintage half slip with lace trim at the hem

Vassarette is a brand of women's underwear owned by Vanity Fair Brands, a division of Fruit of the Loom. Until 2010 the brand was owned by the Northwestern Knitting Company, which became Munsingwear. Their lines include bras, stockings and lingerie, and they were previously a major manufacturer of girdles. Originally advertised discreetly in ladies' magazines, they have more recently advertised on prominent and sometimes controversial billboards and by sponsorship of motorsport.

Fashion noted designer Monika Tilley created a line for Vassarette that "featured ankle-length sweaters in bold stripes worn over monochromatic tops and leggings, styles that would not be out of place today."
