= Douglas P. Scott =

American politician

38th Mayor of Rockford
- In office May 2001 – May 2005
- Preceded by: Charles Box
- Succeeded by: Larry Morrissey

Member of the Illinois House of Representatives from the 67th district
- In office January 1995 – April 2001
- Preceded by: Paula J. Raschke-Lind
- Succeeded by: Charles E. Jefferson

Personal details
- Born: January 17, 1960 (age 66) Rockford, Illinois
- Party: Democratic
- Spouse: Tammy Scott
- Education: University of Tulsa (BA); Marquette University (JD)

Douglas P. Scott (born July 17, 1960) is an American politician and current chairman of the Illinois Commerce Commission. He has served as a member of the Illinois House of Representatives, mayor of Rockford, Illinois, and as director the Illinois Environmental Protection Agency.

== Early life and career ==
Douglas P. Scott was born on January 17, 1960 in Rockford, Illinois. He graduated with honors from the University of Tulsa in 1982 and graduated cum laude from Marquette University Law School in 1985. His legal career included time as the city attorney for the City of Rockford, Illinois.

== Illinois House of Representatives ==
Scott was elected to the Illinois House of Representatives from the 67th district in 1994. In 1995, he joined the newly created "Illinois New Democratic Caucus," a group that billed itself as the state version of the Democratic Leadership Council. In 1999, he was the chair of the House Committee on Urban Revitalization. After being elected mayor of Rockford, he was succeeded by Charles E. Jefferson.

== Mayor of Rockford ==
He was elected mayor after Charles Box declined to seek another term. served one term from 2001 to 2005. He implemented Rockford's citywide recycling program along with a program to collect used animal fats, engine oil and hazardous waste. He lost reelection in 2005 in a rematch with Larry Morrissey.

== Post-mayoral political career ==
Scott was appointed to head the Illinois Environmental Protection Agency after losing his mayoral reelection bid in 2005. On March 3, 2011, Governor Pat Quinn nominated Scott to succeed Manny Flores as the chairman of the Illinois Commerce Commission for a term starting March 3, 2011 and ending January 20, 2014. He was confirmed by the Illinois Senate on March 31, 2011. He was not reappointed by Governor Bruce Rauner. He returned to the commission under Governor J. B. Pritzker on June 20, 2023.

Political offices
Preceded by Charles Box	Mayor of Rockford, Illinois; 2001–2005	Succeeded by Larry Morrissey
