= Dave Vella =

American politician

David A. Vella
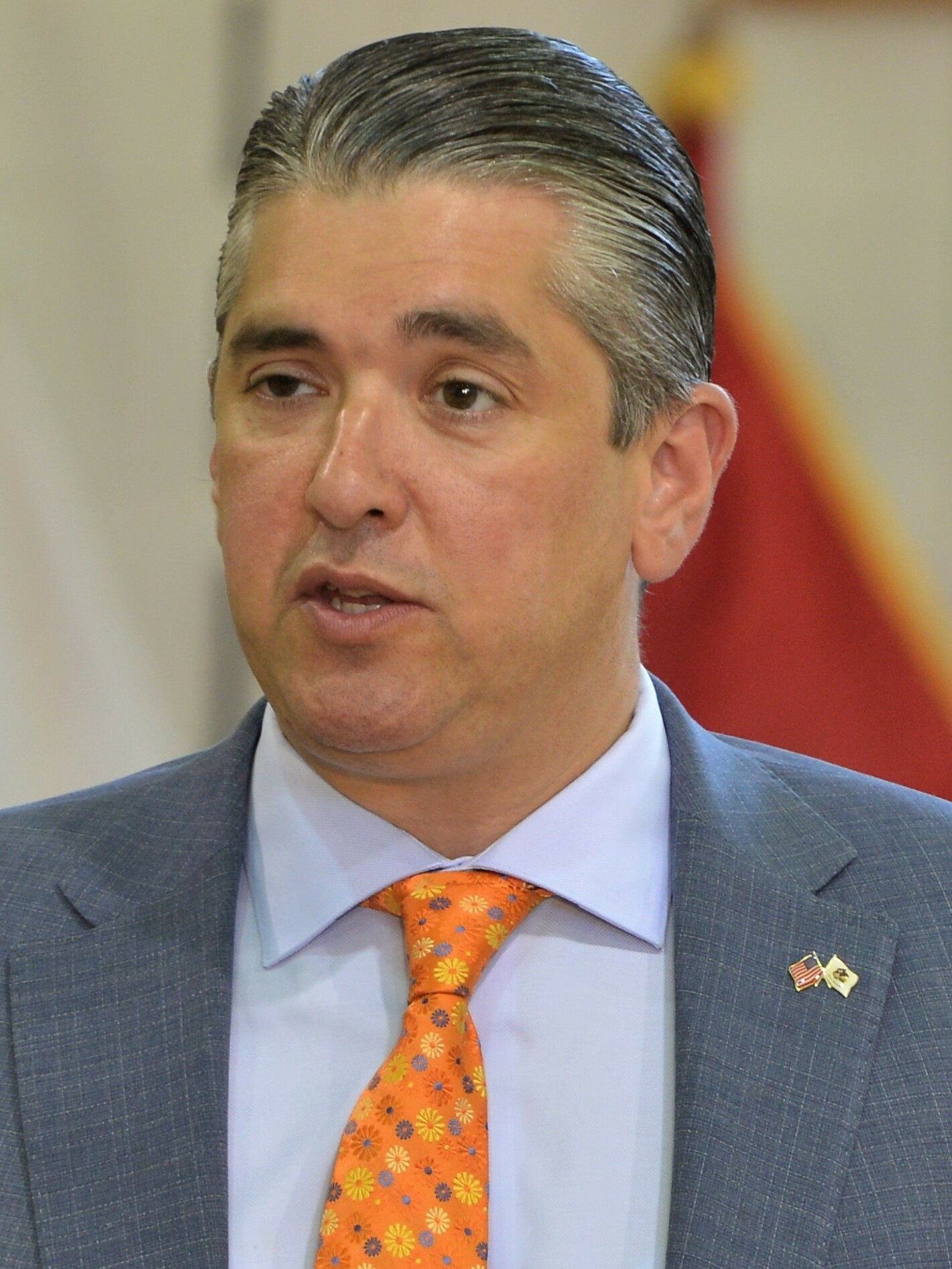

Member of the Illinois House of Representatives from the 68th district
- Incumbent
- Assumed office January 13, 2021
- Preceded by: John Cabello

Personal details
- Party: Democratic
- Spouse: Michelle
- Children: 2
- Relatives: Zeke Giorgi (grandfather)
- Education: Augustana College (BA); Northern Illinois University (JD)
- Occupation: Attorney & Lawmaker

David A. Vella is a Democratic member of the Illinois House of Representatives from the 68th district since January 13, 2021. The 68th district covers parts of Cherry Valley, Loves Park, Machesney Park, Rockford, and Roscoe.

He was first elected to the state House after defeating Republican incumbent John Cabello in the 2020 Illinois House of Representatives election.

== Early life, education, and career ==
Vella is a lifelong resident of Rockford. He graduated from Boylan Catholic High School. He graduated with a BA from Augustana College and in 1997 a JD from Northern Illinois University. He formerly worked as a public defender in Winnebago County. Since 2000, he has been an associate of his family's law firm Vella & Lund, P.C. He is a former member of the Rockford Literacy Council and a former board president of Keith Country Day School.

As of July 3, 2022, Representative Vella is a member of the following Illinois House committees:

- Appropriations – Public Safety Committee (HAPP)
- Child Care Access & Early Childhood Education Committee (HCEC)
- Elementary & Secondary Education: School Curriculum & Policies Committee (HELM)
- Judiciary – Criminal Committee (HJUC)
- Law Enforcement Subcommittee (SHPF-LAWE)
- Police & Fire Committee (SHPF)
- Public Utilities Committee (HPUB)
- Small Cell Subcommittee (HPUB-SCEL)
- Veterans' Affairs Committee (HVET)

== Electoral history ==
Illinois 68th State House District General Election, 2020
Party	Candidate	Votes	%
Democratic	Dave Vella	26,770	50.22
Republican	John M. Cabello (incumbent)	26,531	49.78
Total votes		53,301	100.0

--

Illinois 68th State House District General Election, 2022
Party	Candidate	Votes	%
Democratic	Dave Vella (Incumbent)	17,563	54.73
Republican	Johnathan Ojeda	14,527	45.27
Total votes		32,090	100.0

--

Illinois 68th State House District General Election, 2024
Party	Candidate	Votes	%
Democratic	Dave Vella (Incumbent)	33,688	100.0
Total votes		33,688	100.0

== Personal life ==
Vella and his wife, Michelle, have a daughter and son, Grace and Ryan, respectively. His family are members of St. Anthony's Church. His grandfather was Edolo J. "Zeke" Giorgi, who was a former long-time Illinois state representative in the Rockford area.
