= Maurice West =

American politician (born 1985)

Member of the Illinois House of Representatives from the 67th district
- Incumbent
- Assumed office January 9, 2019
- Preceded by: Litesa Wallace

Personal details
- Born: June 20, 1985 (age 41) Elgin, Illinois, U.S.
- Party: Democratic
- Spouse: Leslie West
- Education: Illinois College (BS); Chicago School of Professional Psychology (MA)
- Website: Campaign website

Maurice A. West II is a Democratic member of the Illinois House of Representatives for the 67th district. West took office on January 9, 2019. The 67th district includes portions of the City of Rockford.

West won a four-person primary against Angela Fellars, Valeri DeCastris, and Gerald Albert. Prior to his election to the Illinois House of Representatives, West ran for Rockford City Council in 2013 and the Rock Valley College board of trustees in 2015.

West was a member of the Community Action Agency Board since his appointment by then-mayor Larry Morrissey. He was the director of career development at Rockford University. West has a Bachelor of Science in psychology and sociology from Illinois College and a Master of Arts in industrial and organizational psychology from The Chicago School of Professional Psychology.

As of July 3, 2022, Representative West is a member of the following Illinois House committees:

- Criminal Administration and Enforcement Committee (HJUC-CAES)
- Firearms and Firearm Safety Subcommittee (HJUC-FIRE)
- Higher Education Committee (HHED)
- Judiciary - Criminal Committee (HJUC)
- Juvenile Justice and System-Involved Youth Subcommittee (HJUC-JJSI)
- Mental Health & Addiction Committee (HMEH)
- Property Tax Subcommittee (HREF-PRTX)
- Public Utilities Committee (HPUB)
- Restorative Justice Committee (SHRJ)
- Revenue & Finance Committee (HREF)
- Sentencing, Penalties, and Criminal Procedure Subcommittee (HJUC-SPCP)
- Sex Offenses and Sex Offender Registration Subcommittee (HJUC-SOSO)
- Special Issues Subcommittee (HMEH-ISSU)
- Utilities Subcommittee (HPUB-UTIL)

== Mascots ==
In 2019, Rep. West introduced a bill that would force Hononegah High School to stop using Native American mascots. It passed in 2021. He filed similar bills in 2021, 2024 and 2025. In addition, he sponsored a bill in 2023 requiring Native American education in schools.

In 2025, Rep. West introduced bill HB3527 called the Prohibition of Discriminatory Disability Mascots Act after public pressure from disabled adults with and parents of children with dwarfism complained about Freeburg Community High School mascot, Marty the Midget.

== Electoral history ==
Illinois 67th State House District Democratic Primary, 2018
Party	Candidate	Votes	%
Democratic	Maurice A. West II	2,786	39.81
Democratic	Angela Fellars	1,913	27.33
Democratic	Valeri DeCastris	1,532	21.89
Democratic	Gerald O. Albert	768	10.97
Total votes		6,999	100.0

Illinois 67th State House District General Election, 2018
Party	Candidate	Votes	%
Democratic	Maurice A. West II	18,623	100.0
Total votes		18,623	100.0

Illinois 67th Representative District General Election, 2020
Party	Candidate	Votes	%
Democratic	Maurice A West II	19,742	66.53
Republican	Kathleen (Kathie) Jo Hansen	9,932	33.47
Total votes		29,674	100.0

Illinois 67th Representative District General Election, 2022
Party	Candidate	Votes	%
Democratic	Maurice A West II	13,880	55.58
Republican	Glen Oland	11,094	44.42
Total votes		24,974	100.0
