= Illinois Commerce Commission =

State agency in Illinois, United States

Logo of the Illinois Commerce Commission

The Illinois Commerce Commission is a quasi-judicial tribunal that regulates public utility services in the U.S. state of Illinois. The mission of the ICC is "to pursue an appropriate balance between the interest of consumers and existing and emerging service providers to ensure the provision of adequate, efficient, reliable, safe and least-cost public utility services." The most visible part of this mission is the setting of rates and charges for service by public utilities. (For the ICC, the term "public utility" includes private companies serving the public, but not municipal utilities that are, in a sense, owned by the public.) Examples of utility types regulated by the ICC include electric, natural gas, telecommunications, water, and sewer. The ICC also regulates certain transportation activities, including railroad safety, towing, trucking, and household goods moving.

Since the 1970s, the Commission's Springfield, Illinois headquarters has been in the former Leland Hotel.

== Chairmen and commissioners ==
The ICC has five Commissioners, who are appointed by the Governor of Illinois for five year terms and confirmed by the Illinois Senate. Under Illinois law, no more than three Commissioners may belong to the same political party.

=== Current Commissioners ===
Position	Name	Party	Residence	Governor	Took office	Term Expires
Chairman	Douglas P. Scott	Democratic	Rockford, Illinois	J. B. Pritzker	2023	2029
Commissioner	Michael T. Carrigan	Democratic	Decatur, Illinois	J. B. Pritzker	2020	2030
Commissioner	Ann McCabe	Republican	Chicago	J. B. Pritzker	2022	2027
Acting Commissioner	Conrad R. Reddick	Democratic	Wheaton, Illinois	J. B. Pritzker	2023	2028
Acting Commissioner	Stacey Paradis	Republican	Chicago	J. B. Pritzker	2023	2028

== See also ==
- Public Utilities Commission
