= LVG (disambiguation) =

LVG or Luftverkehrsgesellschaft m.b.H. was a German aircraft manufacturer.

LVG may also refer to:

- Landesamt für Vermessung und Geoinformation Bayern or LVG, the Bavarian State Office for Survey and Geoinformation
- Livingston Energy Flight's ICAO airline code
- Livingston South railway station's rail station code
- Louis van Gaal or LvG, former footballer and manager
- Lexical Variant Generation (software), a software suite to perform natural language processing of medical documents
- Logical volume group, a component of logical volume management for computer storage

== See also ==
- LGV (disambiguation)
- IVG (disambiguation)
