= Tammy Duckworth =

American politician and military officer (born 1968)

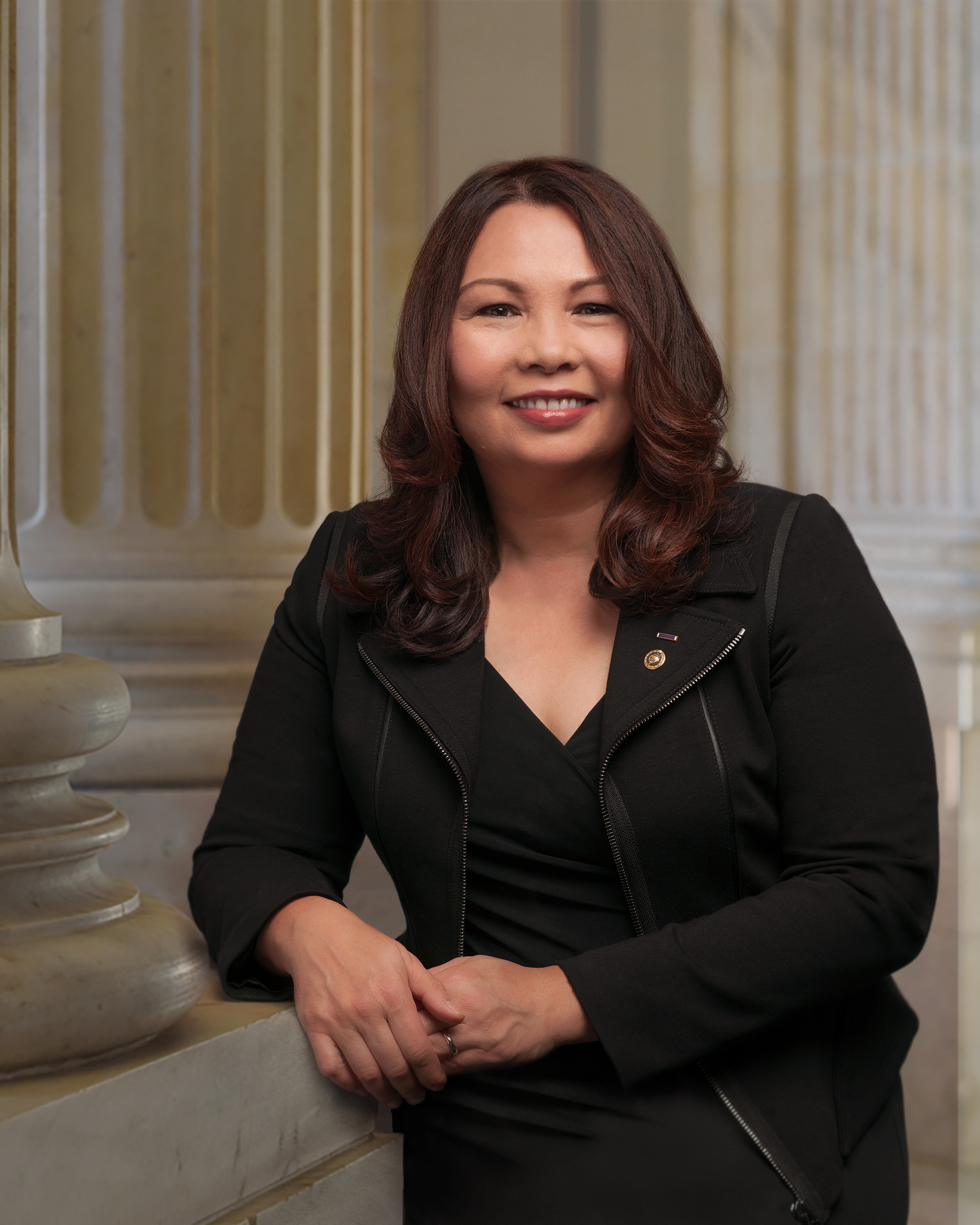
- Official portrait, 2017

United States Senator from Illinois
- Incumbent
- Assumed office January 3, 2017 Serving with Dick Durbin
- Preceded by: Mark Kirk

Vice Chair of the Democratic National Committee
- In office January 21, 2021 – February 1, 2025 Serving with Ken Martin, Gretchen Whitmer and Henry R. Muñoz III
- Chair: Jaime Harrison
- Preceded by: Grace Meng
- Succeeded by: Various

Member of the U.S. House of Representatives from Illinois's 8th district
- In office January 3, 2013 – January 3, 2017
- Preceded by: Joe Walsh
- Succeeded by: Raja Krishnamoorthi

Assistant Secretary of Veterans Affairs for Public and Intergovernmental Affairs
- In office April 24, 2009 – June 30, 2011
- President: Barack Obama
- Preceded by: Lisette M. Mondello
- Succeeded by: Michael Galloucis

Director of the Illinois Department of Veterans Affairs
- In office November 21, 2006 – February 8, 2009
- Governor: Rod Blagojevich; Pat Quinn
- Preceded by: Roy Dolgos
- Succeeded by: Daniel Grant

Personal details
- Born: Ladda Tammy Duckworth; March 12, 1968 (age 58) Bangkok, Thailand
- Party: Democratic
- Spouse: Bryan Bowlsbey (m. 1993)
- Children: 2
- Education: University of Hawaii, Manoa (BA); George Washington University (MIA); Northern Illinois University (attended); Capella University (PhD)
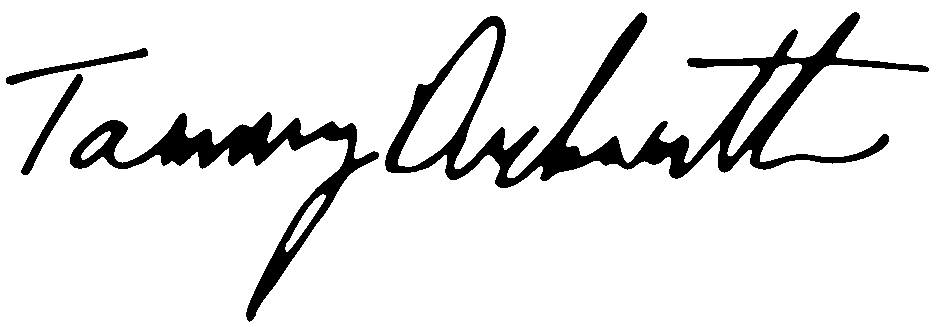
- Signature
- Website: Senate website Campaign website

Military service
- Allegiance: United States
- Branch/service: United States Army; U.S. Army Reserve
- Years of service: 1992–1996 (reserve); 1996–2014 (guard)
- Rank: Lieutenant colonel
- Unit: Illinois Army National Guard; 106th Aviation Regiment; 28th Infantry Division
- Battles/wars: Iraq War (WIA)
- Awards: Purple Heart; Air Medal; Army Commendation Medal; Dame Grand Cross (First Class) of the Order of the Crown of Thailand
- Tammy Duckworth's voice Tammy Duckworth speaks on food insecurity among military families Recorded September 14, 2022

Ladda Tammy Duckworth (born March 12, 1968) is an American politician and Army National Guard veteran serving as the junior United States senator from Illinois, a seat she has held since 2017. A member of the Democratic Party, she represented Illinois's 8th congressional district in the U.S. House of Representatives from 2013 to 2017.

Born in Bangkok, Thailand, and raised in Honolulu, Hawaii, Duckworth was educated at the University of Hawaii at Manoa and George Washington University. She joined the United States Army Reserve in 1992, and served as a United States Army helicopter pilot in the Iraq War. In 2004, when her Black Hawk helicopter was hit by a rocket-propelled grenade fired by Iraqi insurgents, she lost both legs and some mobility in her right arm. She was the first female double amputee from the war. Despite her injuries, she was awarded a medical waiver to continue serving in the Illinois Army National Guard for another ten years until she retired as a lieutenant colonel in 2014.

Duckworth ran unsuccessfully for a seat in the U.S. House of Representatives in 2006, then served as director of the Illinois Department of Veterans Affairs from 2006 to 2009 and as assistant secretary for public and intergovernmental affairs at the U.S. Department of Veterans Affairs from 2009 to 2011. In 2012, Duckworth was elected to the U.S. House of Representatives, where she served two terms. She was elected to the U.S. Senate in 2016, defeating Republican incumbent Mark Kirk.

Duckworth is the first Thai-American woman elected to Congress, the first person born in Thailand elected to Congress, the first woman with a disability elected to Congress, the first female double amputee in the Senate, and the first senator to give birth while in office. She is the second Asian American woman to serve in the Senate, after Mazie Hirono. Duckworth serves on the Senate Armed Services; Commerce, Science, & Transportation; Foreign Relations; and Veterans' Affairs Committees. Duckworth is set to become Illinois's senior senator when Dick Durbin retires in 2027.

== Early life and education ==
Ladda Tammy Duckworth was born on March 12, 1968, in Bangkok, Thailand, to an American father, Franklin Duckworth, and a Thai mother, Lamai Sompornpairin. Her father, who died in 2005, was a veteran of the U.S. Army and U.S. Marine Corps who traced his family's roots to the American Revolution. Duckworth is also descended from Henry Coe, her 6th-great-grandfather, who enslaved four people mentioned in freedom clauses of his 1827 will; according to Duckworth, although "gut wrenching" . . . "it's a disservice to our nation and our history to walk away from this [fact]. If I am going to claim—and be proud that—I am a Daughter of the American Revolution, then I have to acknowledge that I am also a daughter of people who enslaved other people". Her mother is Thai Chinese, originally from Chiang Mai. Her father was a Baptist, who after his military service worked with the United Nations and international companies in refugee, housing, and development programs. As the family moved around Southeast Asia for her father's work, Duckworth became fluent in Thai and Indonesian, in addition to English.

Duckworth attended schools outside the U.S. but based on a standard American curriculum: Singapore American School, the International School Bangkok, and the Jakarta International School. The family moved to Honolulu, Hawaii, when Duckworth was 16, and she attended Honolulu's President William McKinley High School, where she participated in track and field and graduated in 1985. Because of a difference in the grade levels between the school systems she attended, Duckworth skipped half of her ninth grade year and half of her tenth. She was a Girl Scout, and earned her First Class (Gold Award). Her father was unemployed for a time, and the family relied on public assistance. She graduated from the University of Hawaii at Manoa in 1989 with a Bachelor of Arts in political science. In 1992, she received a Master of Arts in international affairs from George Washington University's Elliott School of International Affairs.

After moving to Illinois, Duckworth began a Doctor of Philosophy program at Northern Illinois University, with interests in public health and the politics of southeast Asia, which was interrupted by her war service. She completed a PhD in human services at Capella University School of Public Service Leadership in March 2015. Her dissertation was titled Exploring Illinois physicians' experience using electronic medical records (EMR) via the UTAUT model.

== Military service ==
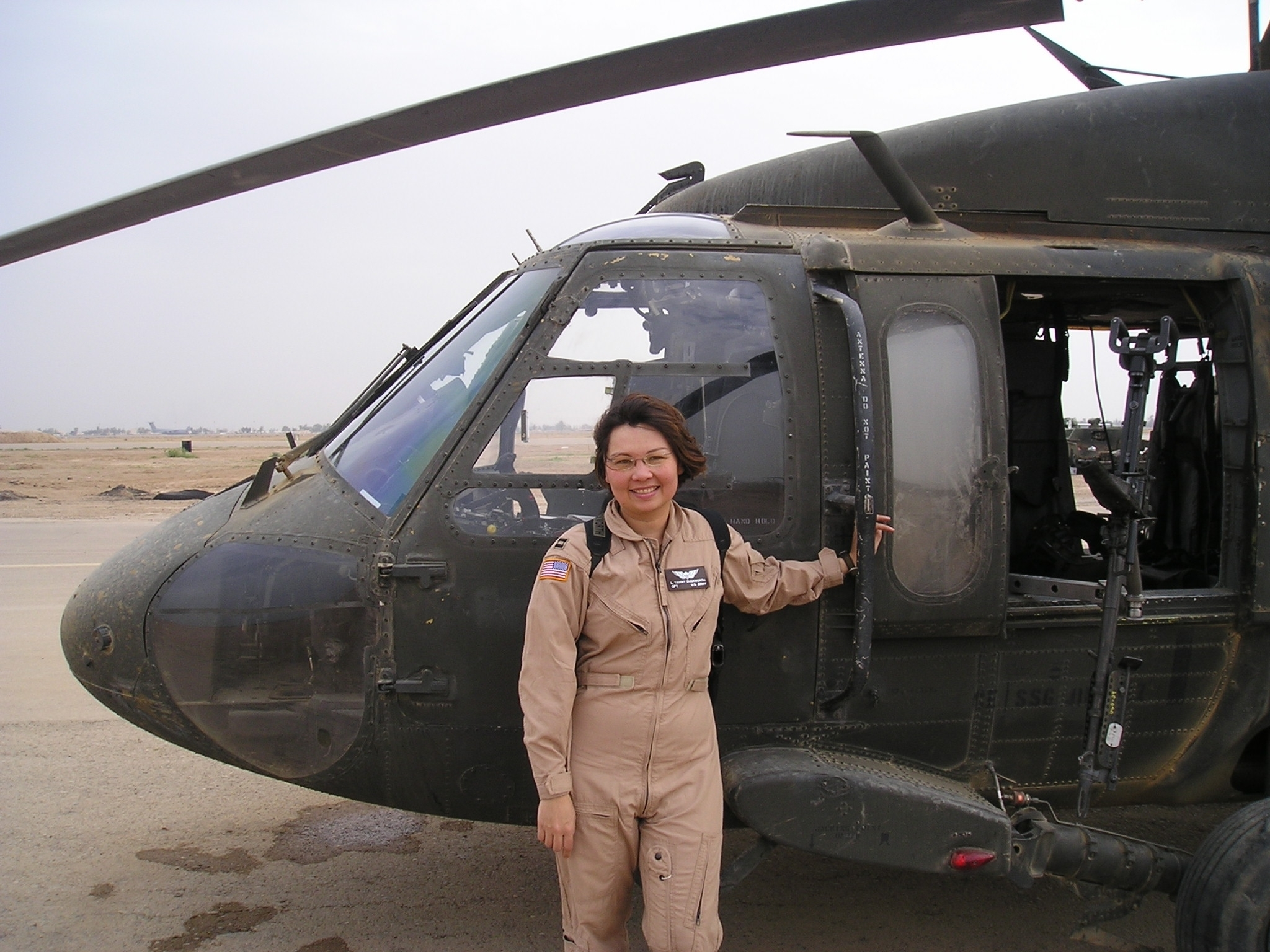
Captain Duckworth in 2000

Following in the footsteps of her father, who served in World War II and the Vietnam War, and ancestors who served in every major conflict since the Revolutionary War, Duckworth joined the Army Reserve Officers' Training Corps in 1990 as a graduate student at George Washington University. She became a commissioned officer in the United States Army Reserve in 1992 and chose to fly helicopters because it was one of the few combat jobs open to women at that time. As a member of the Army Reserve, she went to flight school, later transferring to the Army National Guard and in 1996 entering the Illinois Army National Guard. Duckworth also worked as a staff supervisor at Rotary International headquarters in Evanston, Illinois, and was the coordinator of the Center for Nursing Research at Northern Illinois University.

Duckworth was working toward a PhD in political science at Northern Illinois University, with research interests in the political economy and public health of southeast Asia, when she was deployed to Iraq in 2004. She lost her right leg near the hip and her left leg below the knee from injuries sustained on November 12, 2004, when the UH-60 Black Hawk helicopter she was co-piloting was hit by a rocket-propelled grenade fired by Iraqi insurgents. She was the first American female double amputee from the Iraq War. The explosion severely broke her right arm and tore tissue from it, necessitating major surgery to repair it. She has said she narrowly avoided becoming a triple amputee thanks to Adam Hamawy, a combat surgeon who she said used "a vascular procedure he'd just learned in medical school." Duckworth received a Purple Heart on December 3 and was promoted to the rank of major on December 21 at Walter Reed Army Medical Center, where she was presented with an Air Medal and Army Commendation Medal. She retired from the Illinois Army National Guard in October 2014 as a lieutenant colonel.

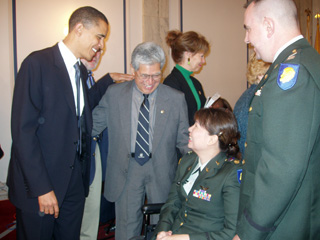
Duckworth with Senators Barack Obama and Daniel Akaka in 2005 at a Veterans Affairs hearing

In 2011, the Daughters of the American Revolution erected a statue with Duckworth's likeness and that of Molly Pitcher in Mount Vernon, Illinois. The statue is dedicated to female veterans.

In 2019, Duckworth participated in the National Air and Space Museum's "The Military Women Aviators Oral History Initiative (MWAOHI)" project alongside fourteen other veteran women aviators, including Olga Custodio, Sarah Deal, Stayce Harris, Jeannie Leavitt, Nicole Malachowski, Sally Murphy, Tammie Shults, Jacqueline Van Ovost, Lucy Young, and Kim "K. C." Campbell.

== Government service ==
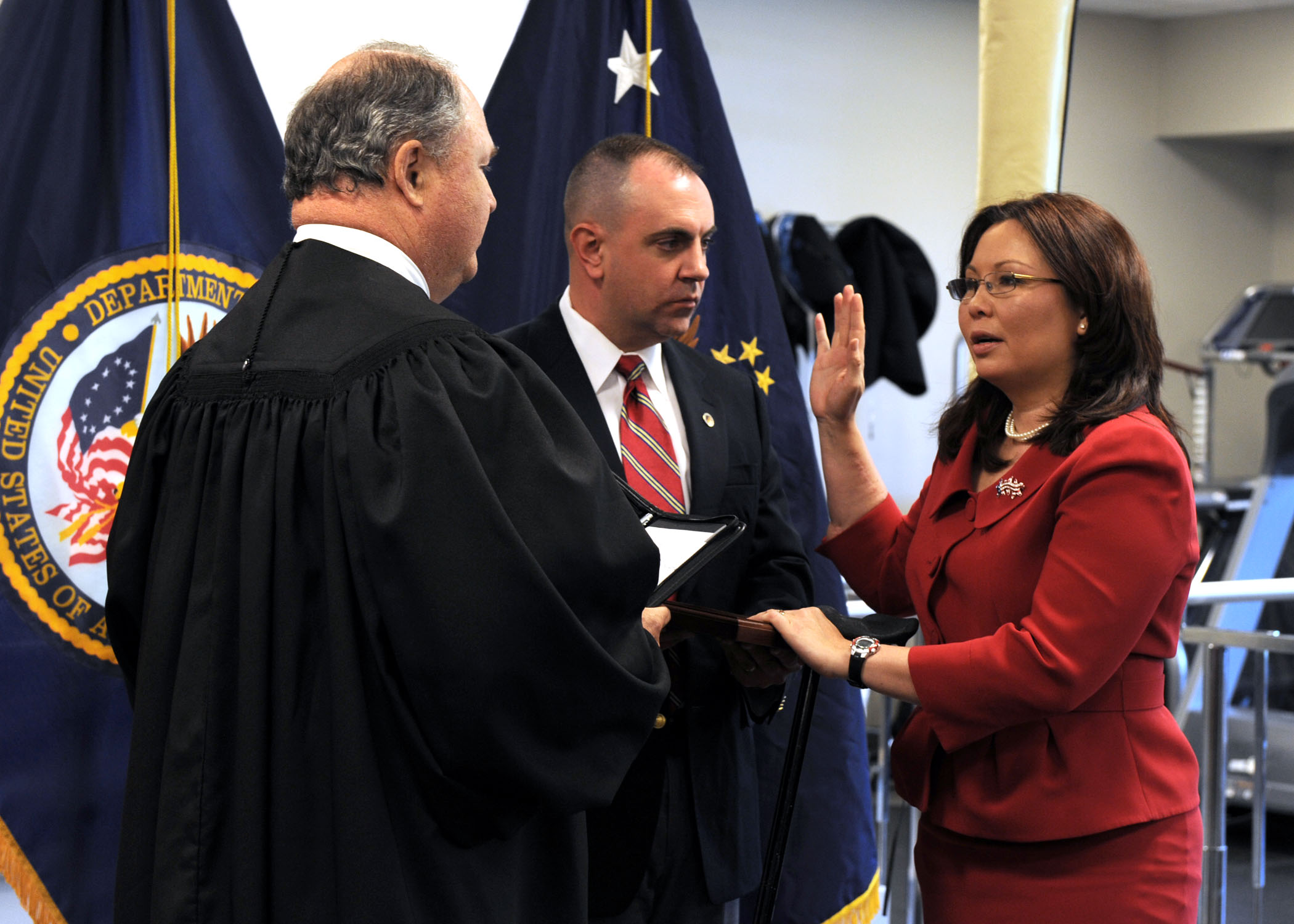
Duckworth being sworn in as Assistant Secretary of Public and Intergovernmental Affairs for the United States Department of Veterans Affairs, by Judge John J. Farley with her husband Bryan Bowlsbey beside her

On November 21, 2006, several weeks after losing her first congressional campaign, Duckworth was appointed director of the Illinois Department of Veterans Affairs by Governor Rod Blagojevich. She served in that position until February 8, 2009. While director, she was credited with starting a program to help veterans with post-traumatic stress disorder (PTSD) and veterans with brain injuries.

On September 17, 2008, Duckworth attended a campaign event for Dan Seals, the Democratic candidate for Illinois's 10th congressional district. She used vacation time, but violated Illinois law by going to the event in a state-owned van that was equipped for a person with physical disabilities. She acknowledged the mistake and repaid the state for the use of the van.

In 2009, two Illinois Department of Veterans Affairs employees at the Anna Veterans' Home in Union County filed a lawsuit against Duckworth. The lawsuit alleged that she wrongfully terminated one employee and threatened and intimidated another for bringing reports of abuse and misconduct of veterans when she was head of the Illinois Department of Veterans Affairs. Duckworth was represented in the suit by the Illinois Attorney General's office. The case was dismissed twice but refilings were allowed. The case settled in June 2016 for $26,000 with no admission of wrongdoing. The plaintiffs later indicated they no longer wanted to settle, but the judge gave them 21 days to sign the settlement and canceled the trial.

On February 3, 2009, President Barack Obama nominated Duckworth to be the Assistant Secretary of Public and Intergovernmental Affairs for the United States Department of Veterans Affairs (VA). and the United States Senate confirmed her for the position on April 22. As Assistant Secretary, she coordinated a joint initiative with the U.S. Department of Housing and Urban Development to help end Veteran homelessness, worked to address the unique challenges faced by female as well as Native American Veterans, and created the Office of Online Communications to improve the VA's accessibility, especially among young Veterans. Duckworth resigned her position in June 2011 in order to launch her campaign for the U.S. House of Representatives in Illinois's 8th congressional district in the 2012 election.

== U.S. House of Representatives ==
=== Elections ===
==== 2006 ====
After longtime incumbent Republican Henry Hyde announced his retirement from Congress, several candidates began campaigning for the open seat. Duckworth won the Democratic primary with a plurality of 44%, defeating 2004 nominee Christine Cegelis with 40%, and Wheaton College professor Lindy Scott with 16%. State Senator Peter Roskam was unopposed in the Republican primary. For the general election, Duckworth was endorsed by EMILY's List, a political action committee that supports female Democratic candidates who back abortion rights. She was also endorsed by the Brady Campaign to Prevent Gun Violence and the Fraternal Order of Police. While she raised $4.5 million to Roskam's $3.44 million, Duckworth lost by 4,810 votes, receiving 49% to Roskam's 51%.

==== 2012 ====
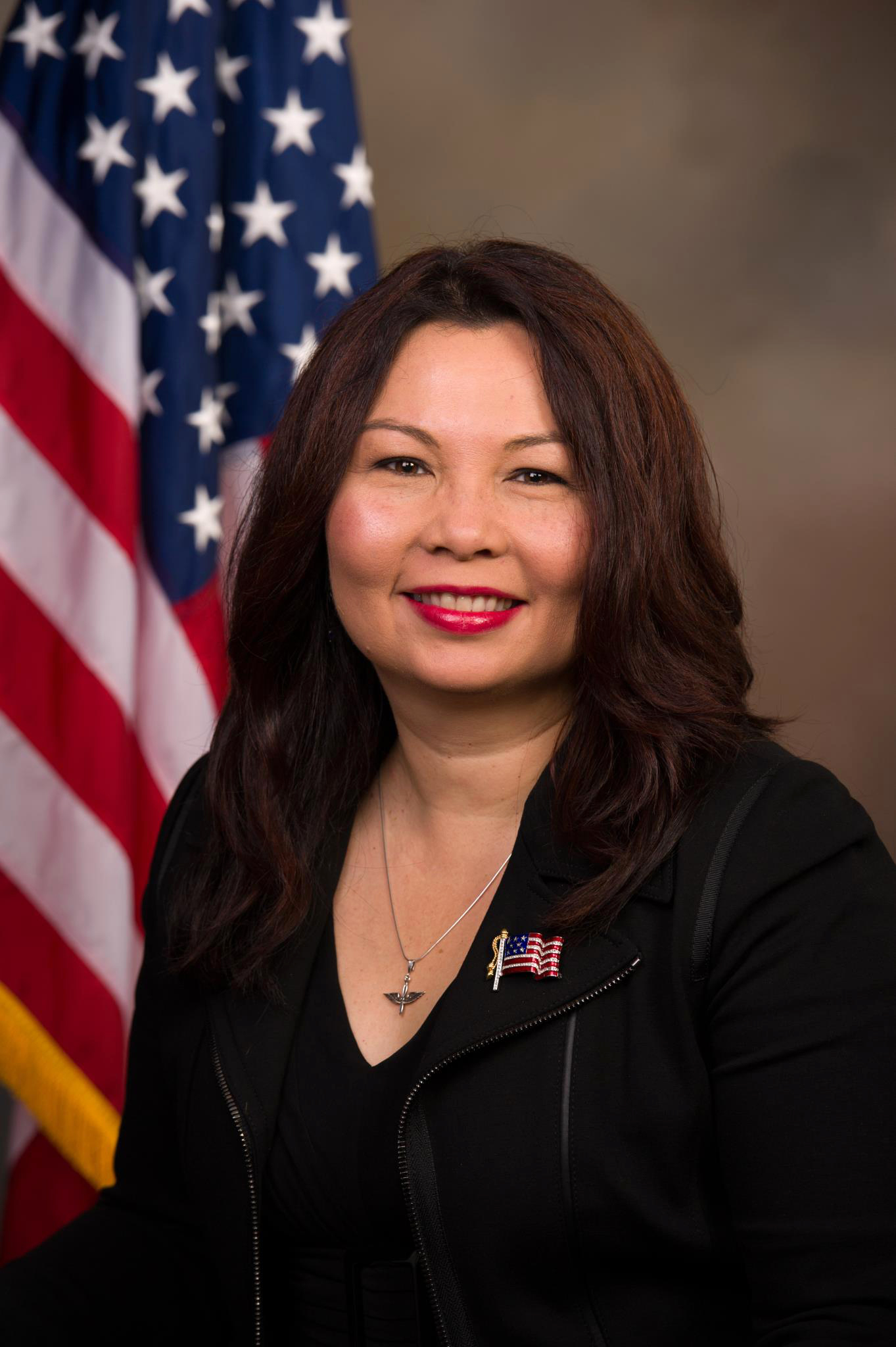
Duckworth as a U.S. representative during the 113th congress

In July 2011, Duckworth launched her campaign to run in 2012 for Illinois's 8th congressional district. She defeated former Deputy Treasurer of Illinois Raja Krishnamoorthi for the Democratic nomination on March 20, 2012, then faced incumbent Republican Joe Walsh in the general election. Duckworth received the endorsement of both the Chicago Tribune and the Daily Herald. Walsh generated controversy when in July 2012, at a campaign event, he accused Duckworth of politicizing her military service and injuries, saying "my God, that's all she talks about. Our true heroes, the men and women who served us, it's the last thing in the world they talk about." Walsh called the controversy over his comments "a political ploy to distort my words and distract voters" and said that "Of course Tammy Duckworth is a hero ... I have called her a hero hundreds of times."

On November 6, 2012, Duckworth defeated Walsh, 55% to 45%, making her the first Asian-American from Illinois in Congress, the first woman with a disability elected to Congress, and the first member of Congress born in Thailand.

==== 2014 ====
In the 2014 general election, Duckworth faced Republican nominee Larry Kaifesh, a United States Marine Corps officer who had recently left active duty as a colonel. She defeated Kaifesh, 56% to 44%.

=== Tenure ===
Duckworth was sworn into office on January 3, 2013.

On April 3, 2013, Duckworth publicly returned 8.4% ($1,218) of her congressional salary for that month to the United States Department of Treasury in solidarity with furloughed government workers.

On June 26, 2013, during a hearing of the House Oversight and Government Reform Committee, Duckworth received national media attention after questioning Strong Castle CEO Braulio Castillo on a $500 million government contract the company had been awarded based on Castillo's disabled veteran status. Castillo had injured his ankle at the US Military Academy's prep school, USMAPS, in 1984.

=== Committee assignments ===
- Committee on Armed Services
  - Subcommittee on Tactical Air and Land Forces (2013–2017)
  - Subcommittee on Oversight and Investigations (2013–2015)
  - Subcommittee on Readiness (2015–2017)
- Committee on Oversight and Government Reform
  - Subcommittee on Energy Policy, Health Care and Entitlements (2013–2015)
  - Subcommittee on Economic Growth, Job Creation and Regulatory Affairs (2013–2015)
  - Subcommittee on Transportation and Public Assets, Ranking Member (2015–2017)
  - Subcommittee on Information Technology (2015–2017)
- United States House Select Committee on Benghazi (May 2014–July 2016)

== U.S. Senate ==
=== Elections ===
==== 2016 ====
On March 30, 2015, Duckworth announced that she would challenge incumbent Republican U.S. senator Mark Kirk in the 2016 Senate election in Illinois. She defeated Andrea Zopp and Napoleon Harris in the March 15, 2016, Democratic primary.

During a televised debate on October 27, 2016, Duckworth talked about her ancestors' past service in the U.S. military. Kirk responded, "I'd forgotten that your parents came all the way from Thailand to serve George Washington." This led the Human Rights Campaign to rescind its endorsement of Kirk and switch it to Duckworth, calling Kirk's comment "deeply offensive and racist."

Duckworth was endorsed by Barack Obama, who actively campaigned for her.

On November 8, Duckworth defeated Kirk, 55% to 40%. She and Kamala Harris, who was also elected in 2016, are the second and third female Asian American senators, after Mazie Hirono, who was elected in 2012.

==== 2022 ====
In March 2021, Duckworth announced her candidacy for reelection in 2022. On November 8, 2022, she was reelected, defeating Republican nominee Kathy Salvi, 57% to 42%. The win made Duckworth the first woman reelected to the Senate from Illinois.

=== Tenure ===
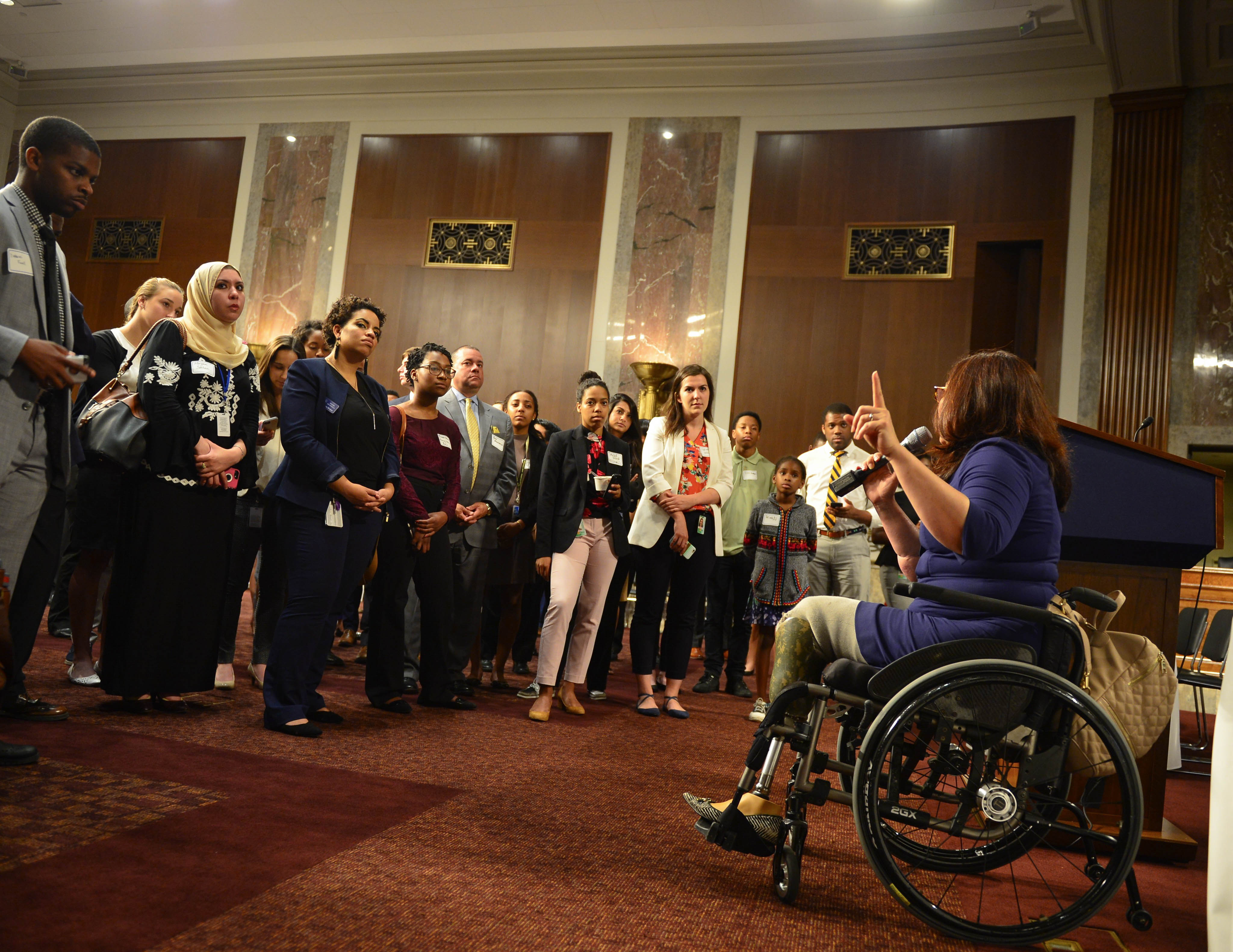
Senate Diversity Initiative in support of diversity in the Senate and its staff, June 21, 2017

==== First term (2017–2023) ====
According to the Center for Effective Lawmaking (CEL), a joint partnership between the University of Virginia's Frank Batten School of Leadership and Public Policy and Vanderbilt University, Duckworth's "Legislative Effectiveness Score" (LES) is "Exceeds Expectations" as a freshman senator in the 115th Congress (2017–18), the 11th highest out of 48 Democratic senators.

GovTrack's Report Card on Duckworth for the 115th Congress found that among Senate freshmen, she ranked first in favorably reporting bills out of committee and "Got influential cosponsors the most often compared to Senate freshmen." GovTrack also found that in the first session of the 116th Congress, Duckworth ranked first in favorably reporting bills out of committee and "Got influential cosponsors the most often compared to Senate sophomores."

During the 115th Congress, Duckworth was credited with saving the Americans with Disabilities Act. Specifically, she led public opposition to a controversial bill, H.R. 620, and led 42 senators in pledging to oppose any effort to pass H.R. 620 through the Senate. The Veterans Service Organization and Paralyzed Veterans of America recognized Duckworth's leadership in defending the Americans with Disabilities Act.

In January 2018, when the federal government shut down after the Senate could not agree on a funding bill, Duckworth responded to President Trump's accusations that the Democrats were putting "unlawful immigrants" ahead of the military:

I spent my entire adult life looking out for the well-being, the training, the equipping of the troops for whom I was responsible. Sadly, this is something that the current occupant of the Oval Office does not seem to care to do—and I will not be lectured about what our military needs by a five-deferment draft dodger. And I have a message for Cadet Bone Spurs: If you cared about our military, you'd stop baiting Kim Jong Un into a war that could put 85,000 American troops, and millions of innocent civilians, in danger.

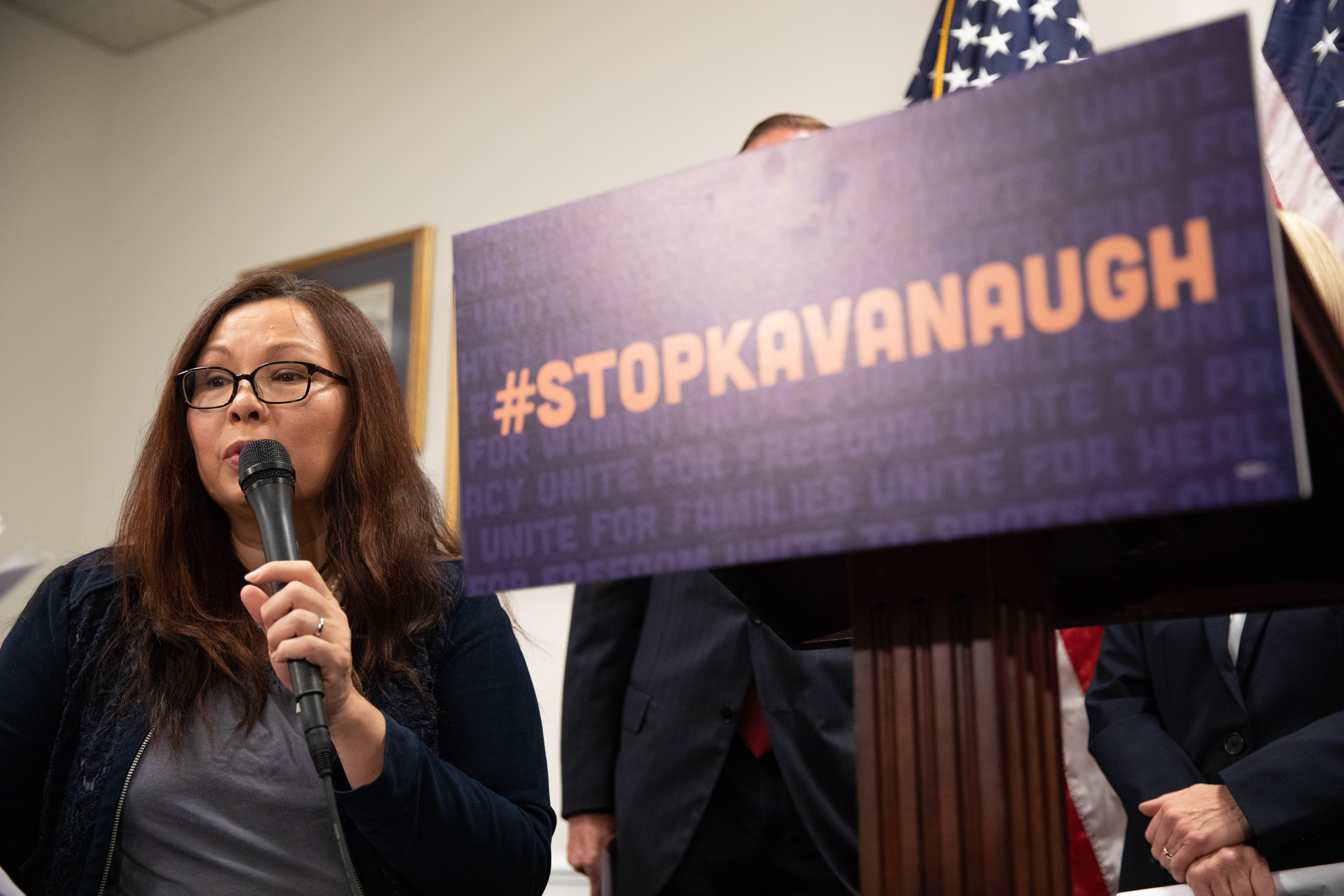
Stop Kavanaugh press conference on September 6, 2018

In 2018, Duckworth became the first U.S. senator to give birth while in office. Shortly afterward, the Senate passed Senate Resolution 463, which she introduced on April 12, 2018, by unanimous consent. The resolution changed Senate rules so that a senator may bring a child under one year old to the Senate floor during votes. The day after the rules were changed, Duckworth's daughter became the first baby on the Senate floor.

On April 15, 2020, the Trump administration invited Duckworth to join a bipartisan task force on the reopening of the economy amid the COVID-19 pandemic.

Duckworth was publicly critical of Trump's decision to nominate Amy Coney Barrett to the Supreme Court in September 2020. A devout Catholic, Barrett is a member of a group that considers in vitro fertilization immoral. Duckworth said that Barrett's membership in such an organization was "disqualifying and, frankly, insulting to every parent".

The Center for Effective Lawmaking ranked Duckworth the fifth-most effective Democratic senator in the 116th Congress and the most effective Democratic senator on transportation policy. Craig Volden and Alan Wiseman, co-directors of the Center for Effective Lawmaking, said, "While still in her first term, Senator Tammy Duckworth has risen to the top five among effective Democratic lawmakers in the Senate. She sponsored 77 bills in the 116th Congress, with four of them passing the Republican-controlled Senate and two becoming law."

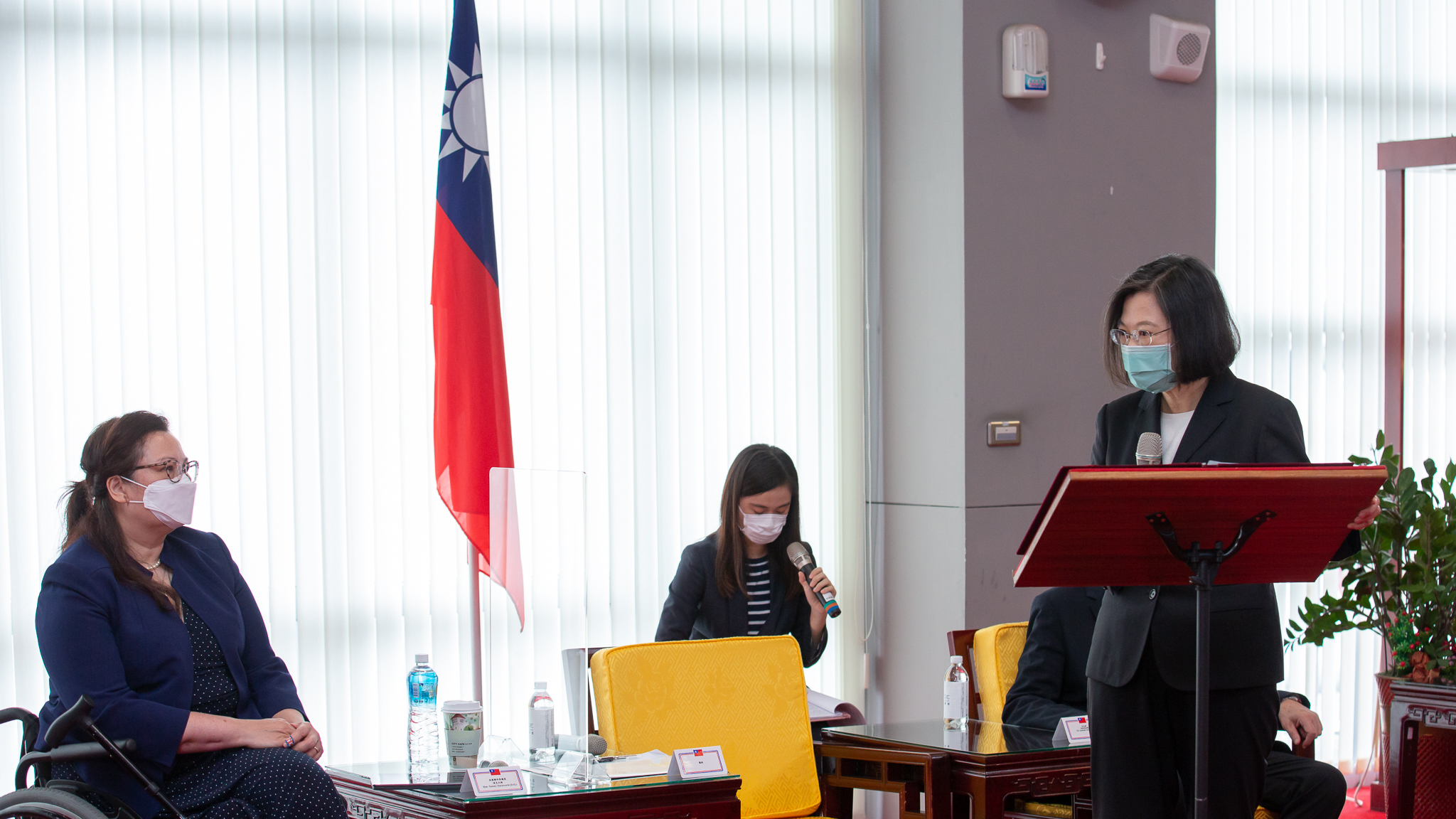
Duckworth and Taiwanese President Tsai Ing-wen in Taipei, Taiwan, June 2021

On January 3, 2021, Duckworth received a vote for Speaker of the House of Representatives from Jared Golden despite not being a member of that legislative body and therefore not a serious candidate.

Duckworth was participating in the certification of the 2021 United States Electoral College vote count when Trump supporters stormed the U.S. Capitol. In the wake of the attack, she called Trump "a threat to our nation" and called for his immediate removal from office through the invocation of the Twenty-fifth Amendment to the United States Constitution or impeachment. Two days later, on January 8, she also called for the resignation of Representative Mary Miller, who had quoted Adolf Hitler during a speech on January 5.

In June 2022, President Biden sent Duckworth to Taiwan, where she held a press conference with Tsai Ing-wen to announce the U.S.–Taiwan Initiative on 21st-Century Trade in the wake of fears of angering China by the other partners to the May 2022 Indo-Pacific Economic Framework. Her mission was planned in conjunction with the Office of the United States Trade Representative, which leads the Initiative for Washington.

Duckworth is the sponsor of S. 3635, the Public Safety Officer Support Act of 2022, which would provide line of duty death designation to law enforcement and other public safety officers who die as a result of traumatic brain injury, PTSD, and other "silent" injuries. The bill is based on the death of Washington, D.C., police officer Jeffrey Smith in the aftermath of the January 6, 2021, Capitol attack. Smith died of post-concussive syndrome after suffering repeated attacks at the Capitol.

==== Second term (2023–present) ====
In February 2023, Duckworth was named chair of the Subcommittee on Aviation Safety, Operations and Innovation of the Committee on Commerce, Science, and Transportation. She and Deb Fischer sponsored a bill to improve reporting on complaints from disabled airline passengers. In June 2023, Duckworth criticized Senator Kyrsten Sinema for proposing legislation to limit the amount of time an airplane pilot needs to train for certification.

In November 2023, Duckworth organized a meeting with Israeli defense officials to discuss their strategy in the Gaza war. In January 2024, when asked whether she would support a ceasefire in the Gaza Strip, she replied that it "would not help the residents of Gaza nor would it help the security of Israel". In July 2025, a press release from Duckworth explaining her vote against the sale of weapons to Israel cited her "deep frustration with the Netanyahu government's abject failure to address humanitarian needs in Gaza", referring to the Gaza Strip famine.

=== Committee assignments ===
==== Current ====
- Committee on Armed Services (2019–present)
  - Subcommittee on Airland
  - Subcommittee on Readiness and Management Support
  - Subcommittee on Strategic Forces
- Committee on Commerce, Science, and Transportation
  - Subcommittee on Aviation Operations, Safety, and Security (ranking member)
  - Subcommittee on Communications, Technology, Innovation, and the Internet
  - Subcommittee on Consumer Protection, Product Safety, Insurance and Data Security
  - Subcommittee on Surface Transportation and Merchant Marine Infrastructure, Safety, and Security
- Committee on Foreign Relations (2023–present)
  - Subcommittee on Multilateral International Development, Multilateral Institutions, and International Economic, Energy and Environmental Policy (chair)
  - Subcommittee on Europe and Regional Security Cooperation
  - Subcommittee on East Asia, The Pacific, and International Cybersecurity Policy
- Committee on Small Business and Entrepreneurship

==== Previous ====
- Committee on Energy and Natural Resources (2017–2019)
- Committee on Environment and Public Works (2017–2023)

=== Caucus memberships ===
- Congressional Asian Pacific American Caucus
- Expand Social Security Caucus
- Senate Taiwan Caucus
- Senate Whistleblower Protection Caucus

== National politics ==
Duckworth spoke at the 2008, 2012, 2016, 2020, and 2024 Democratic National Conventions. She was the permanent co-chair of the 2020 Democratic National Convention. At the 2020 convention, she called Trump "coward-in-chief" for not supporting the American military.

Duckworth was vetted as a possible running mate during Joe Biden's vice presidential candidate selection. Kamala Harris was selected instead. Biden nominated Duckworth as vice chair of the Democratic National Committee, along with Gretchen Whitmer, Keisha Lance Bottoms and Filemon Vela Jr.

== Political positions ==
=== Environment ===
In April 2019, Duckworth was one of 12 senators to sign a bipartisan letter to top senators on the Appropriations Subcommittee on Energy and Water Development advocating that the Energy Department be granted maximum funding for carbon capture, utilization and storage (CCUS), arguing that American job growth could be stimulated by investment in viable options to capture carbon emissions and expressing disagreement with Trump's 2020 budget request to combine the two federal programs that include carbon capture research. She was a member of the Senate Democrats' Special Committee on the Climate Crisis, which published a report of its findings in August 2020.

=== Foreign policy ===
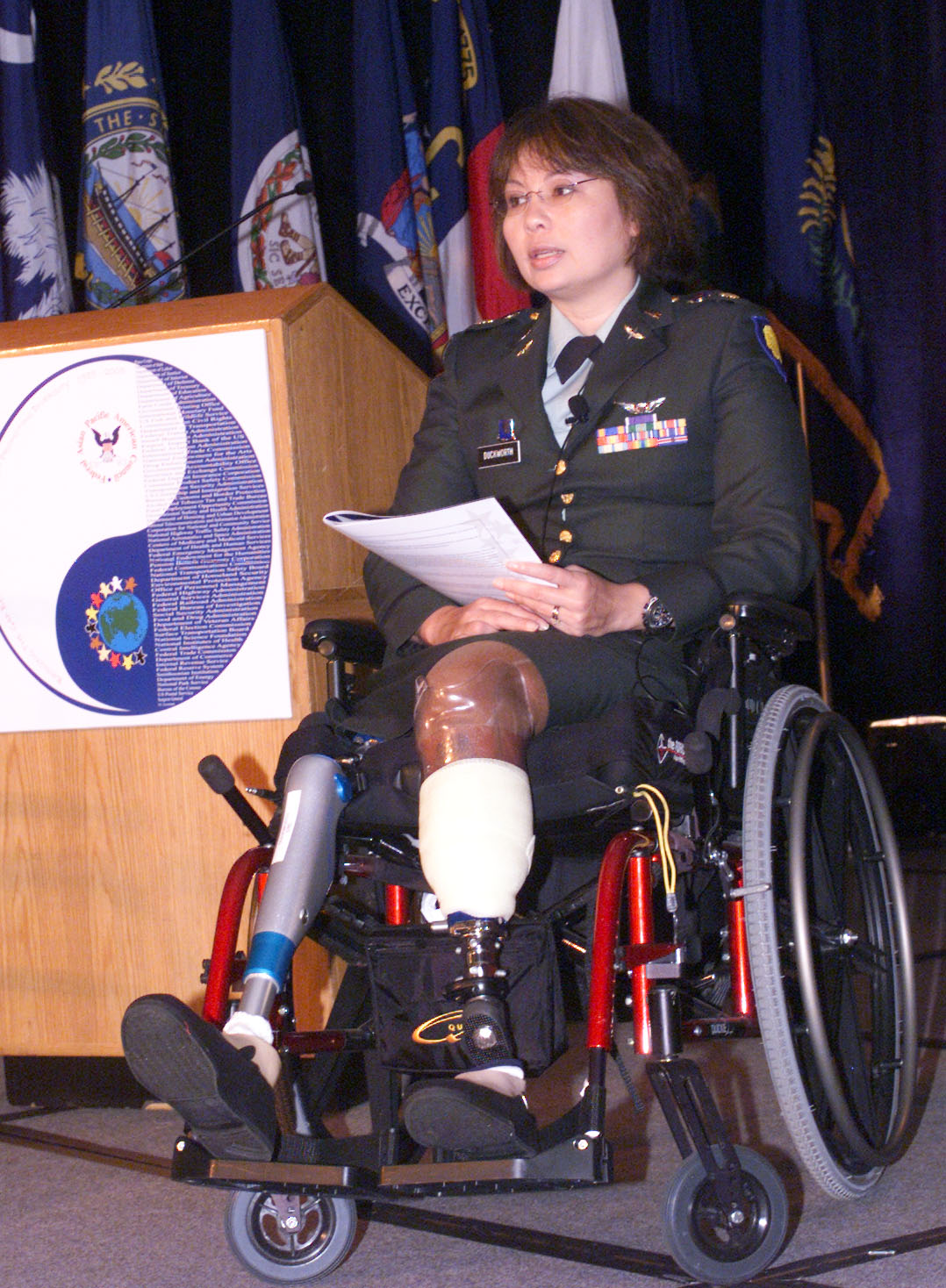
Duckworth narrates the Salute to Fallen Asian Pacific Islander Heroes in Arlington, Virginia, June 2, 2005.

During her unsuccessful 2006 congressional campaign, Duckworth called on Congress to audit the estimated $437 billion spent on overseas military and foreign aid since September 11, 2001.

On September 30, 2006, Duckworth gave the Democratic Party's response to President George W. Bush's weekly radio address. In it, she criticized Bush's Iraq War strategy.

In October 2006, The Sunday Times reported that Duckworth agreed with General Sir Richard Dannatt, the British Army chief, that the presence of coalition troops was exacerbating the conflict in Iraq. Duckworth supports continued U.S. military aid to Israel and opposes the movement for Boycott, Divestment and Sanctions (BDS) against Israel. She opposes Israel's plan to annex parts of the occupied West Bank.

In May 2019, Duckworth was a cosponsor of the South China Sea and East China Sea Sanctions Act, a bipartisan bill reintroduced by Marco Rubio and Ben Cardin that was intended to disrupt China's consolidation or expansion of its claims of jurisdiction over both the sea and air space in disputed zones in the South China Sea.

On June 6, 2021, Duckworth and Senators Dan Sullivan and Christopher Coons visited Taipei in a U.S. Air Force C-17 Globemaster III transport to meet President Tsai Ing-wen and Minister Joseph Wu during the pandemic outbreak of Taiwan to announce President Biden's donation plan of 750,000 COVID-19 vaccines included in the global COVAX program.

=== Gun control ===
Duckworth was rated by the National Rifle Association of America as having a pro-gun control congressional voting record. A gun owner herself, she cites violence in Chicago as a major influence for her support of gun control. She supports universal background checks, the halting of state-to-state gun trafficking, and a national assault weapons ban.

Duckworth participated in the 2016 Chris Murphy gun control filibuster. During the 2016 United States House of Representatives sit-in, she hid her mobile phone in her prosthetic leg to prevent it being taken away from her since taking pictures and recording on the House floor is against policy.

In a 2016 interview with GQ magazine, Duckworth said that gaining control of the Senate and "closing the gap" in the House would be necessary to pass firearm restrictions. She also said she believed that moderate Republicans, who support gun control, would have more power if they were not "pushed aside by those folks who are absolutely beholden to the NRA. And so we never get the vote."

=== Health policy ===
Duckworth supports abortion rights. After Roe v. Wade was overturned in 2022, she said she was "outraged and horrified" and called the decision a "nightmare" that robbed women of their right to make health care decisions.

Duckworth supported the Affordable Care Act.

=== Immigration ===
Duckworth supports comprehensive immigration reform with a pathway to citizenship for those in the country illegally. She would admit 100,000 Syrian refugees into the United States.

In August 2018, Duckworth was one of 17 senators to sign a letter spearheaded by Kamala Harris to United States Secretary of Homeland Security Kirstjen Nielsen demanding that the Trump administration take immediate action in attempting to reunite 539 migrant children with their families, citing each passing day of inaction as intensifying "trauma that this administration has needlessly caused for children and their families seeking humanitarian protection."

In January 2025, Duckworth voted against the Laken Riley Act.

== Awards and accolades ==
In May 2010, Northern Illinois University awarded Duckworth the honorary degree of Doctor of Humane Letters. In 2011, Chicago's Access Living honored her for her work on behalf of veterans with disabilities, giving her the Gordon H. Mansfield Congressional Leadership Award.

Duckworth is heavily decorated for her service in Iraq, with over 10 distinct military honors, most notably the Purple Heart, an award her Marine father had also received. In 2010, she was inducted into the Army Women's hall of fame.

Former Republican presidential candidate and U.S. senator Bob Dole dedicated his autobiography One Soldier's Story in part to Duckworth. Duckworth credits Dole for inspiring her to pursue public service, while she recuperated at Walter Reed Army Medical Center.

== Personal life ==
Duckworth has been married to Bryan Bowlsbey since 1993. They met during Duckworth's participation in the Reserve Officers' Training Corps and served together in the Illinois Army National Guard. A Signal Corps officer, Bowlsbey is also a veteran of the Iraq War. Both have since retired from the armed forces.

Duckworth and Bowlsbey have two children, born in 2014 and 2018. Her second child's birth made Duckworth the first U.S. senator to give birth while in office. Former Senator Daniel Akaka helped the couple name both children; he died on April 6, 2018, three days before the second was born. Shortly thereafter, the Senate changed its rules to allow senators to bring children under one year old on the Senate floor to breastfeed. This was a symbolic moment for Duckworth, as she had previously introduced the bipartisan Friendly Airports for Mothers (FAM) Act to ensure new mothers access to safe, clean, and accessible lactation rooms in airports. The day after the rule change, Duckworth brought her baby with her while casting a vote, making Duckworth the first senator to cast a vote while holding a baby. Duckworth has discussed using IVF to conceive her children after struggling with infertility for 10 years, saying, "my struggle with infertility was more painful than any wound I earned on the battlefield".

Duckworth helped establish the Intrepid Foundation to help injured veterans.

== Military awards and decorations ==
Duckworth earned the following decorations and awards during her US Army career:

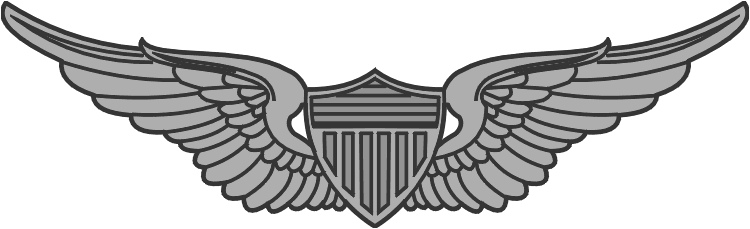

Army Aviator Badge
Purple Heart		Meritorious Service Medal
Air Medal	Army Commendation Medal with 1 bronze Oak leaf cluster	Army Reserve Components Achievement Medal with 4 bronze Oak leaf clusters
National Defense Service Medal	Global War on Terrorism Expeditionary Medal	Global War on Terrorism Service Medal
Armed Forces Reserve Medal with bronze hourglass device and "M" device	Army Service Ribbon	Army Reserve Overseas Training Ribbon with award numeral 2

== Publications ==
Articles

- "We've Been on the Front Lines. We Know What Ukraine Needs." The New York Times, July 24, 2023 (co-authored with Mark Kelly).

== Electoral history ==
Illinois 6th Congressional District Democratic Primary, 2006
Party	Candidate	Votes	%
Democratic	L. Tammy Duckworth	14,283	43.85
Democratic	Christine Cegelis	13,159	40.40
Democratic	Lindy Scott	5,133	15.76
Total votes		32,575	100.0

Illinois 6th Congressional District General Election, 2006
Party	Candidate	Votes	%
Republican	Peter J. Roskam	91,382	51.35
Democratic	L. Tammy Duckworth	86,572	48.65
Write-in votes	Patricia Elaine Beard	3	0.00
Total votes		177,957	100.0

Illinois 8th Congressional District Democratic Primary, 2012
Party	Candidate	Votes	%
Democratic	Tammy Duckworth	17,097	66.18
Democratic	Raja Krishnamoorthi	8,736	33.82
Total votes		25,833	100.0

Illinois 8th Congressional District General Election, 2012
Party	Candidate	Votes	%
Democratic	Tammy Duckworth	123,206	54.74
Republican	Joe Walsh (incumbent)	101,860	45.26
Total votes		225,066	100.0

Illinois 8th Congressional District General Election, 2014
Party	Candidate	Votes	%
Democratic	Tammy Duckworth (incumbent)	84,178	55.73
Republican	Larry Kaifesh	66,878	44.27
Total votes		151,056	100.0

Illinois U.S. Senator (Class III) Democratic Primary, 2016
Party	Candidate	Votes	%
Democratic	Tammy Duckworth	1,220,128	64.38
Democratic	Andrea Zopp	455,729	24.05
Democratic	Napoleon Harris	219,286	11.57
Democratic	Patricia Elaine Beard	1	0.00
Total votes		1,895,144	100.0

Illinois U.S. Senator (Class III) General Election, 2016
Party	Candidate	Votes	%
Democratic	Tammy Duckworth	3,012,940	54.86
Republican	Mark Steven Kirk (incumbent)	2,184,692	39.78
Libertarian	Kenton McMillen	175,988	3.20
Green	Scott Summers	117,619	2.14
Write-in votes	Chad Koppie	408	0.01
Write-in votes	Jim Brown	106	0.00
Write-in votes	Christopher Aguayo	77	0.00
Write-in votes	Susana Sandoval	42	0.00
Write-in votes	Eric Kufi James Stewart	5	0.00
Write-in votes	Patricia Beard	1	0.00
Total votes		5,491,878	100.0

Illinois U.S. Senator (Class III) General Election, 2022
Party	Candidate	Votes	%
Democratic	Tammy Duckworth (incumbent)	2,329,136	56.82
Republican	Kathy Salvi	1,701,055	41.50
Libertarian	Bill Redpath	68,671	1.68
Write-in votes	Lowell Martin Seida	23	0.00
Write-in votes	Connor Vlakancic	11	0.00
Total votes		4,098,896	100.0

== Bibliography ==
External videos
- After Words interview with Duckworth on Every Day Is a Gift, April 10, 2021, C-SPAN

- Duckworth, Tammy. Every Day is a Gift: A Memoir, Little, Brown & Company, 2021.

== See also ==
- List of Asian Americans and Pacific Islands Americans in the United States Congress
- List of United States senators born outside the United States
- Women in the United States House of Representatives
- Women in the United States Senate

Political offices
Preceded by Roy Dolgos	Director of the Illinois Department of Veterans Affairs; 2006–2009	Succeeded by Daniel Grant
Preceded by Lisette Mondello	Assistant Secretary of Veterans Affairs for Public and Intergovernmental Affairs; 2009–2011	Succeeded by Michael Galloucis
U.S. House of Representatives
Preceded by Joe Walsh	Member of the U.S. House of Representatives from Illinois's 8th congressional district 2013–2017	Succeeded by Raja Krishnamoorthi
Party political offices
Preceded by Alexi Giannoulias	Democratic nominee for U.S. Senator from Illinois (Class 3); 2016, 2022	Most recent
U.S. Senate
Preceded by Mark Kirk	U.S. Senator (Class 3) from Illinois; 2017–present Served alongside: Dick Durbin, Juliana Stratton (elect)	Incumbent
U.S. order of precedence (ceremonial)
Preceded by Todd Young	Order of precedence of the United States as United States Senator	Succeeded by Catherine Cortez Masto
Preceded by Todd Young	United States senators by seniority 58th	Succeeded by Maggie Hassan
