= Linda Chapa LaVia =

American politician

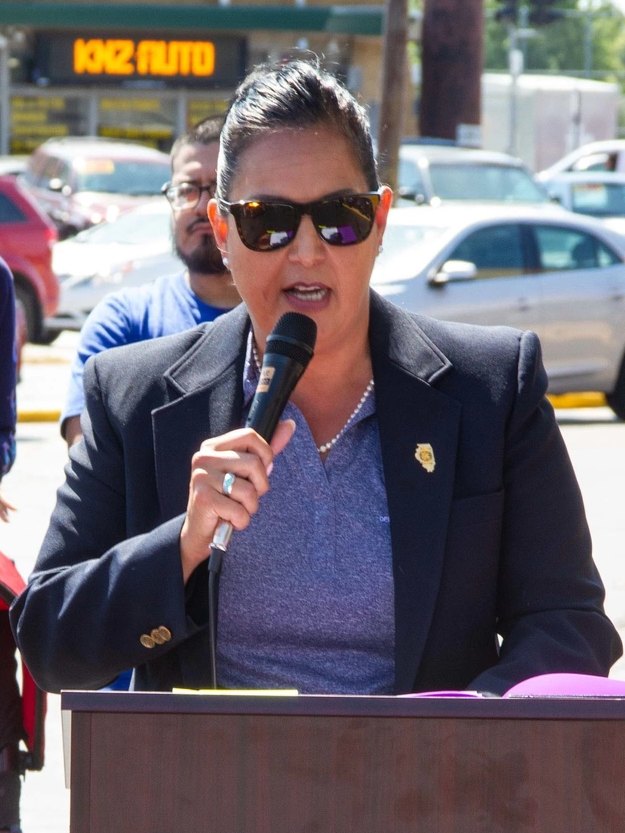
- Chapa LaVia speaking in 2019

Member of the Illinois House of Representatives from the 83rd district
- In office January 2003 – February 2019
- Preceded by: Brent Hassert (redistricted)
- Succeeded by: Barbara Hernandez

Personal details
- Born: August 16, 1966 (age 60) Aurora, Illinois, U.S.
- Party: Democratic
- Spouse: Vernon
- Children: Two
- Education: University of Illinois

Linda Chapa LaVia (born August 16, 1966) is an American politician and was a Democratic member of the Illinois House of Representatives, representing the 83rd District from 2003 until 2019, when she retired to accept an appointment to the cabinet of Illinois Governor J. B. Pritzker. The district covered part of Kane County, including the city of Aurora. She is the first Hispanic candidate to win a seat in the Illinois General Assembly outside of Cook County.

== Early life and career ==
The daughter of Texas cotton pickers, Linda attended Northern Illinois University and enrolled in the ROTC program, later graduating and becoming an officer in the United States Army. She has a bachelor’s degree in political science from the University of Illinois at Chicago.

Chapa LaVia entered business and became the president and co-owner of Aurora Pizzeria and La Aurora Cigar & Spirits, and a co-owner of Lincoln Manor and CGL Enterprise. She also worked as a managing real estate broker.

At the time of her election to the Illinois House of Representatives, she was a first lieutenant in the Inactive Ready Reserve.

Chapa LaVia, her husband, and two children live in Aurora.

== Political career ==
=== Illinois House of Representatives ===
She was first elected to the Illinois General Assembly in 2002 defeating Bob O'Connor, an Aurora Alderman-At-Large, becoming the first Hispanic to win a seat in the state legislature outside of Cook County.

=== Illinois Department of Veterans'Affairs ===
In 2018, Chapa LaVia was appointed to Governor-elect J.B. Pritzker's transition committee on Veterans' Affairs. On February 15, 2019, Governor Pritzker announced that Chapa LaVia would be appointed the director of the Illinois Department of Veterans' Affairs. Chapa LaVia resigned as Illinois Veterans' Affairs director in January, 2021.

A 2021 report from the Illinois Department of Human Services' Office of the Inspector General stated that systemic mismanagement by the Illinois Veterans' Affairs department had led to 36 deaths from COVID-19 at the LaSalle Veterans' Home. The report specifically called out Chapa LaVia's abdication of her responsibilities.

=== Other political activity ===
Chapa LaVia served as a delegate to the 2012 Democratic National Convention.

She was a candidate for mayor of Aurora, Illinois in the 2017 municipal election. However, she finished third of four candidates and did not advance to the runoff election.
