= Mondello (surname) =

Mondello is an Italian toponymic surname of Mondello, Italy. Notable people with the surname include:

- Bob Mondello (born 1949), American film critic
- Ferdinand J. Mondello (1906–1992), American politician
- Joseph Mondello (1938–2022), American politician
- Lisette M. Mondello, American government official
- Massimiliano Mondello (born 1975), American table tennis player
- Romina Mondello (born 1942), Italian actress and television personality
- Toots Mondello (1911–1992), American saxophonist

== Fictional characters ==
- Larry Mondello, character from Leave It to Beaver
