= Peter Nezamis =

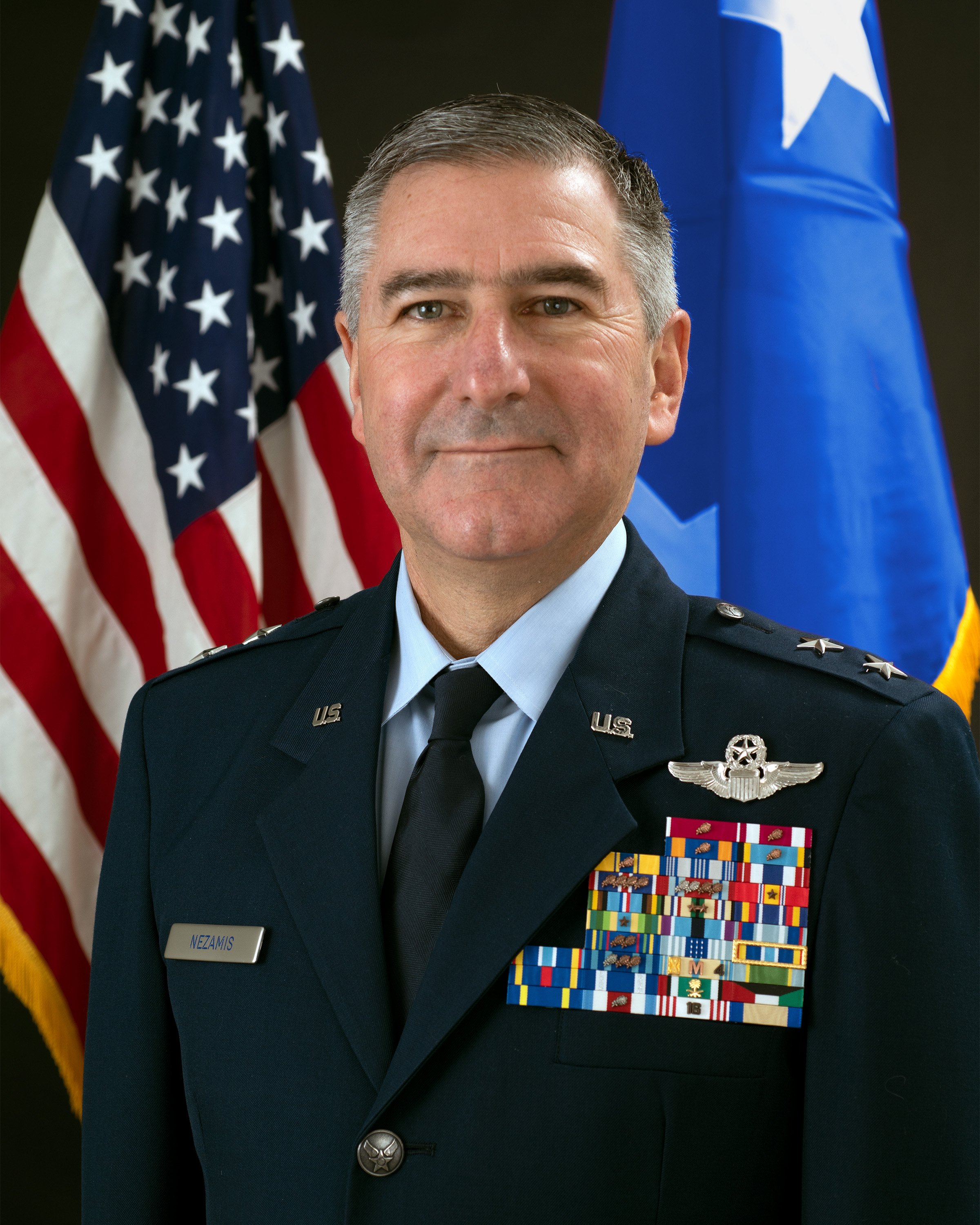
- Born: October 4, 1946 (age 80); Los Angeles County, California, US
- Military career
- Allegiance: United States
- Branch: United States Air Force
- Service years: 1986–2022
- Rank: Major general
- Units: Illinois Air National Guard; Michigan Air National Guard

Peter Nezamis is a retired American military officer and the acting Director of the Illinois Department of Veterans' Affairs.

General Nezamis graduated from Western Michigan University in 1986, where he earned a Bachelor of Science degree in Aviation Technology and Management. In December 1986, he commissioned as a Second Lieutenant in the Michigan Air National Guard. He completed Undergraduate Pilot Training and was assigned to the 108th Air Refueling Squadron at O’Hare International Airport as a KC-135E pilot. He is a command pilot, instructor and evaluator with more than 5,300 hours, commanded numerous expeditionary operations including the 492nd and the 506th Expeditionary Air Refueling Squadrons and flown over 275 combat hours in support of several operations including Operations Desert Strom, Enduring Freedom, and Iraqi Freedom. Previous commands include 126 ARW Wing Commander, Operations Group Commander, and Squadron Commander. Prior to his current assignment, General Nezamis was the Chief of the Joint Staff, Illinois National Guard, Camp Lincoln, Springfield Ill. He is a graduate of the Air War College.

Nezamis retired in 2022.
