= Barbara Hernandez =

American politician

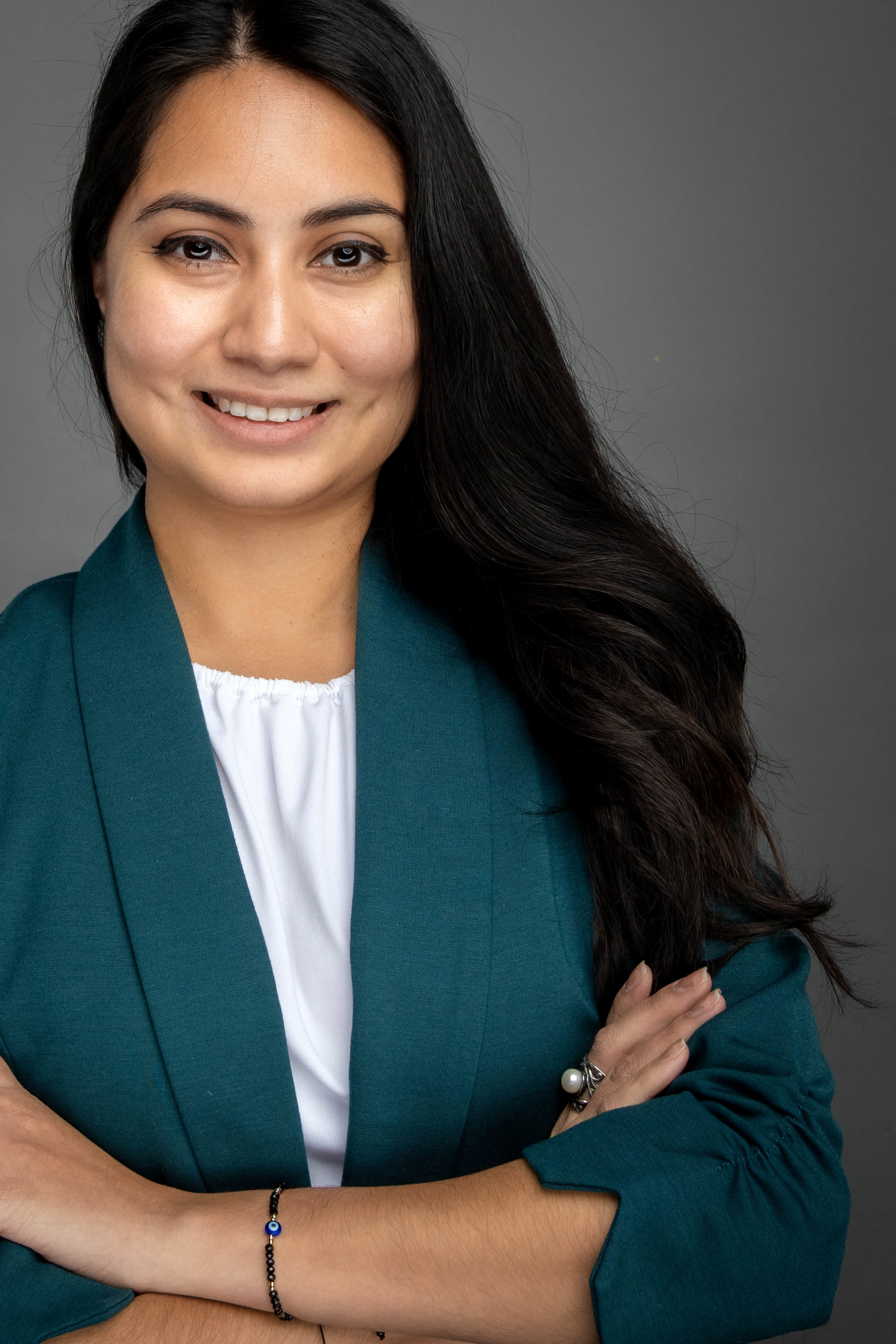

Member of the Illinois House of Representatives from the 83rd district
- Incumbent
- Assumed office March 7, 2019
- Preceded by: Linda Chapa LaVia

Personal details
- Born: 1992 or 1993 (age 33–34)
- Party: Democratic
- Education: Aurora University (BA)
- Profession: Legislator
- Website: Official legislative website

Barbara Hernandez is a Democratic member of the Illinois House of Representatives from the 50th district. The district, located in the Chicago metropolitan area, includes portions of Aurora, North Aurora, and Batavia.

In the House, Hernandez represented the 83rd District from 2019 to 2023. After new legislative maps were drawn to fit new census data, she won re-election to the House from the 50th District.

Prior to her appointment to the House, she was a member of the Kane County Board.

== Illinois House of Representatives ==
In 2019, Hernandez was appointed by the Democratic Representative Committee for the 83rd Representative District to fill the vacancy of the 83rd House District, which was left by Linda Chapa LaVia after her appointment to be Director of the Illinois Department of Veterans' Affairs. Hernandez was sworn into office by Judge Michael Noland on March 7, 2019. She became the youngest member of the General Assembly.

Hernandez won a first full term representing the 83rd District in 2020, defeating Republican Donald Walter.

She again defeated Walter for a third term in 2022, with both running in the redrawn 50th District.

In 2023, House Speaker Chris Welch named Hernandez an Assistant Majority Leader.

=== Committee assignments ===
During the 102nd General Assembly, Hernandez was the Vice-Chairperson of the City and Villages Committee. She also sat on the House Committees for Energy and Environment; Appropriations - Higher Education; Housing; International Trade and Commerce; and the subcommittees for Local Government and Clean Energy.

During the 101st General Assembly, Hernandez was a member of the Cities & Villages; Counties & Townships; Energy & Environment; Higher Education; and State Government Administration committees; and the Special Investigating Committee.

== Electoral history ==
Kane County Board District 8, Democratic Primary 2016
Party	Candidate	Votes	%
Democratic	Barbara Hernandez	418	50.36
Democratic	Margarita "Maggy" Ferguson	264	31.81

Kane County Board District 8, General Election 2016
Party	Candidate	Votes	%
Democratic	Barbara Hernandez	1,257	50.30
Republican	Linda Pasetti-Olson	1,077	43.10

Illinois House of Representatives District 83, Democratic Primary 2020
Party	Candidate	Votes	%
Democratic	Barbara Hernandez	5,340	72.2
Democratic	Juan Thomas	2,053	27.8

Illinois House of Representatives District 83, General Election 2020
Party	Candidate	Votes	%
Democratic	Barbara Hernandez	19,300	71.7
Republican	Donald Walter	7,607	28.3

Illinois House of Representatives District 50, General Election 2022
Party	Candidate	Votes	%
Democratic	Barbara Hernandez	14,188	62.7
Republican	Donald Walter	8,438	37.3

== Personal life ==
Around March 1, 2022, Hernandez experienced a stroke on the House floor. She returned to Springfield on November 15, 2022.

Hernandez resides in Aurora.
