= LG5 =

LG5 or variation, may refer to:

- Chevrolet LG5, a Chevrolet small-block engine
- General Motors LG5, a General Motors 60° V6 engine
- Laminin G domain 5 (LG5)
- Norinco LG5 / QLU-11 (LG5), semiautomatic grenade launcher
- Lower Group 5, of the Bushveld Igneous Complex
- Yonghe Yongping Elementary School metro station (station code LG05) on the Wanda–Zhonghe–Shulin line in New Taipei, Taiwan
- Cēsis district (LG05), Latvia; see List of FIPS region codes (J–L)

== See also ==
- Joanne (album) (#LG5), Lady Gaga's 5th studio album
- LG (disambiguation)
- LGV (disambiguation)
