= IVG =

IVG may refer to:

- In vitro gametogenesis
- Illinois Veteran Grant
- IVG Immobilien
- Berane Airport, IATA code IVG (as the city was formerly known as Ivangrad)
- Abortion, in languages such as French, Italian, and Portuguese where "voluntary interruption of pregnancy" translates with this abbreviation
