= LGV =

LGV may refer to:

== Transportation and vehicles ==
- Large goods vehicle, Europe
- Laser Guided Vehicle
- Light goods vehicle, Hong Kong
- Lignes à Grande Vitesse, French high-speed rail lines:
  - LGV Atlantique
  - LGV Est
  - LGV Interconnexion Est
  - LGV Nord
  - LGV Méditerranée
  - LGV Picardie
  - LGV Rhône-Alpes
  - LGV Rhin-Rhône
  - LGV Sud-Est
  - LGV Sud Europe Atlantique

== Other ==
- Lymphogranuloma venereum, a sexually transmitted disease
- Državljanska lista Gregorja Viranta (LGV) (Gregor Virant's Civic List), former name of Civic List (Slovenia), a political party in Slovenia
- Lattitude Global Volunteering, a British charity — volunteering for young people
- LG V series Android smartphones
- LGV a part of Legal & General
- The Lindström–Gessel–Viennot lemma, of use in algebraic combinatorics

== See also ==
- LVG (disambiguation)
- LG5 (disambiguation)
