= Bavarian State Office for Survey and Geoinformation =

Bavarian State Office for Digitizing, Broadband and Survey Landesamt für Digitalisierung, Breitband und Vermessung Bayern – LDBV –

Department overview
- Formed: 1 August 2005
- Type: state authority
- Jurisdiction: Free State of Bavaria
- Headquarters: Munich
- Department executive: Klement Aringer, President
- Parent department: Bavarian State Ministry of Finance
- Website: www.vermessung.bayern.de

The Bavarian State Office for Digitizing, Broadband and Survey (German: Landesamt für Digitalisierung, Breitband und Vermessung Bayern) or LDBV, until 31 December 2013 Bavarian State Office for Survey and Geoinformation (German: Landesamt für Vermessung und Geoinformation Bayern) or LVG, is the name of the new division of the Bavarian Department of Survey, Information and Communication Technology within the Bavarian State Ministry of Finance formed on 1 August 2005 as part of the administrative reform in Bavaria. It was formed by a merge of the Bavarian State Survey Office and the survey departments of the district finance divisions responsible for cadastral survey.

The LDBV has its headquarters in Munich, discharging its function as a middle-level authority for the 51 survey offices through the three regional divisions in Munich, Landshut and Schwabach. Head of the LDBV since 1 November 2008 is Klement Aringer.

BayernViewer, Bavaria's online mapping and aerial photographic service, is one of the better-known products of this state office.

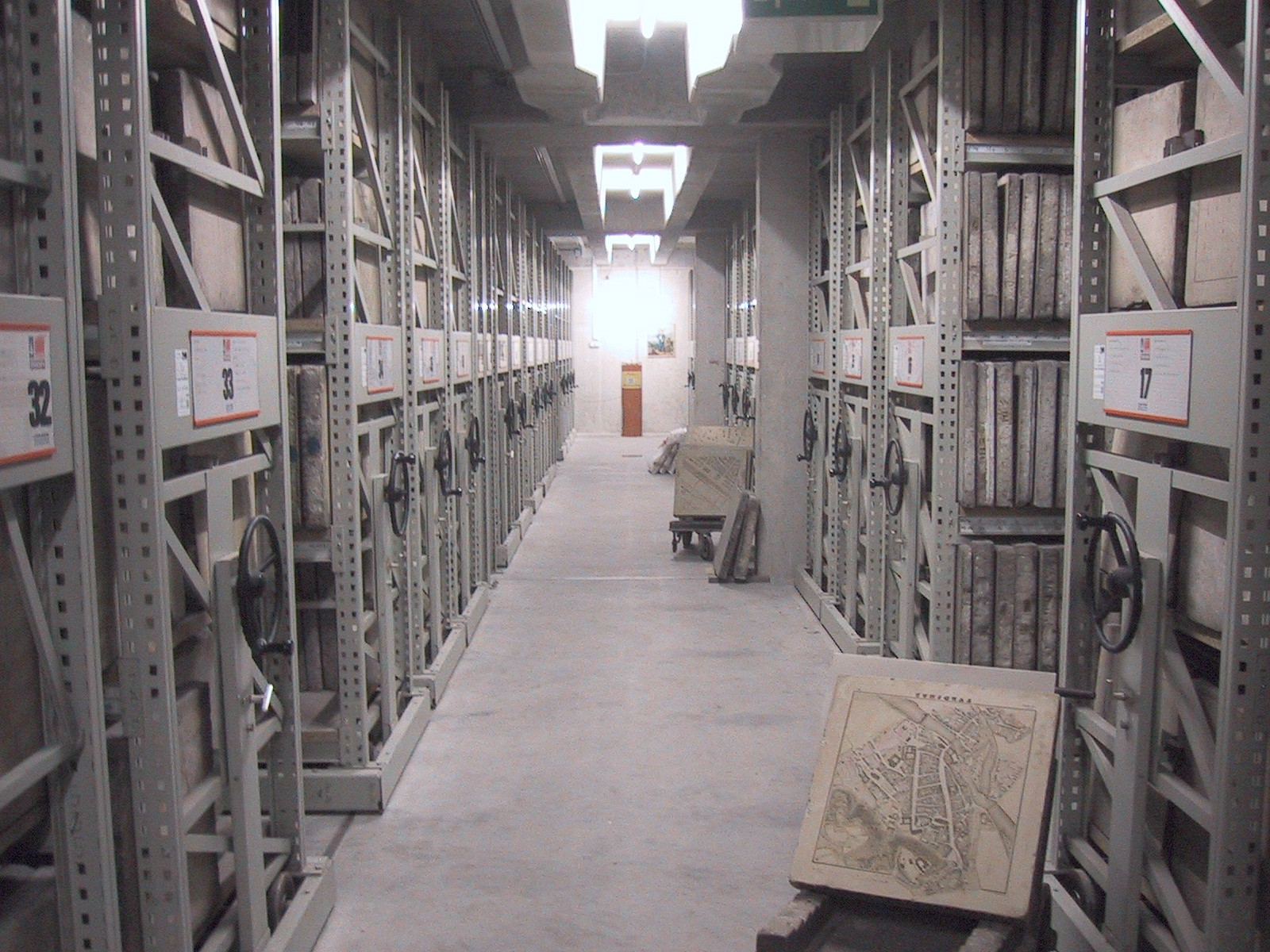
Lithography archive of the Bavarian Survey Office (Munich)

The stone cellar of the State Office for Digitizing, Broadband and Survey is the largest lithographic library in the world.

The office of Feldgeschworene in Bavaria is the oldest known and still operating communal honorary appointment in Bavaria.
