= Lexical Variant Generation (software) =

- Developer(s): The Lexical Systems Group
- Initial release: 2002; 23 years ago
- Stable release: lvg2014 / December 13, 2013; 11 years ago
- Written in: Java
- Platform: Java SE
- Type: Lexical semantics
- License: NLM copyright and terms of use

Lexical Variant Generation (LVG) is a suite of command-line interface (CLI) tools designed to perform lexical transformations on text. The primary goal is to generate lexical variants for Natural language processing of patient clinical documents.

== See also ==
- Lexical semantics
- Unified Medical Language System
