= Lisette M. Mondello =

American government official

Lisette McSoud Mondello
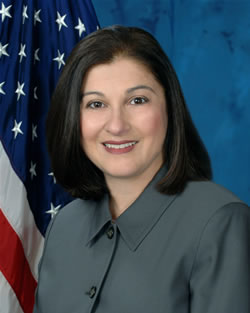

Assistant Secretary of Veterans Affairs for Public and Intergovernmental Affairs
- In office May 4, 2006 – April 24, 2009
- President: George W. Bush; Barack Obama
- Preceded by: Cynthia R. Church
- Succeeded by: Tammy Duckworth

Personal details
- Party: Republican
- Education: Trinity University (BA)

Lisette McSoud Mondello is an American political advisor who served as Assistant United States Secretary of Veterans Affairs for Public and Intergovernmental Affairs from 2006 to 2009.

== Education ==
Mondello earned a Bachelor of Arts degree from Trinity University in San Antonio.

== Career ==
After graduating from college, Mondello worked as a press aide for Senator Kay Bailey Hutchison of Texas, Alfonse D'Amato of New York, and Congressman James M. Collins of Texas. She worked as senior vice president for the Spaeth Communications, a communications and public relations culsultantcy firm founded by Merrie Spaeth, a former communications advisor in the Reagan Administration. She then served as executive director of the Texas Foundation for Conservative Studies and Associated Texans Against Crime.

Before serving in the United States Department of Veterans Affairs, she was senior advisor to the United States Secretary of Education and helped develop the long-term communications plan for the No Child Left Behind Act.

Mondello was succeeded by Tammy Duckworth. Mondello has operated The Mondello Group, a government relations and communications from, since 2012.

Political offices
Preceded by Cynthia R. Church	Assistant Secretary of Public and Intergovernmental Affairs in the Department of Veterans Affairs; May 4, 2006 - April 24, 2009	Succeeded by Tammy Duckworth
