= Lucy Young =

American naval officer (born 1954)

- Born: September 9, 1954 (age 71); Waterbury, Connecticut
- Occupations: Naval officer, pilot
- Known for: First woman to qualify in Naval Air Combat Maneuvering (1980)

Lucy Young (born September 9, 1954, in Waterbury, Connecticut) is an American naval officer. In 1980 she became the first woman to qualify in Naval Air Combat Maneuvering (ACM). After that, she became an ACM instructor. At that time, female aviators were forbidden from combat duty stations. After she retired from the Navy, she got a job at a legacy carrier and became one of the first female captains.

Women had first been allowed to fly military aircraft in 1974.

The first female pilots to be qualified in any type of aircraft were graduated by the United States Air Force in 1978.

Female military personnel were first authorized to be posted to combat stations in 1993.

== Early life and professional trainings ==
Lucy Young was born in Waterbury, Connecticut (on September 9, 1954). She grew up in Roxbury, Connecticut, attending Shepaug Valley High School in Washington, Connecticut. Lucy was selected for a four-year Navy ROTC scholarship to study at Purdue University from which she graduated in 1976 with a B.S. degree. After graduation, she was commissioned an ensign in the US Navy and sent to 42d Attack Squadron (VA-42) at NAS Oceana, Virginia. Lucy Young was selected for flight training in August 1976, she reported to Pensacola, Florida in October 1976. Flying the T-28 Trojan and the T-44 King Air, ENS Young won her wings of gold in October 1977, after which she was selected for Jet Aircraft Transition Training.

== Aviation career ==
Upon qualifying in the TA-4J Skyhawk, Lucy Young moved to Fleet Composite Squadron One (VC-1), NAS Barbers Point, Hawaii where she accumulated over 1000 hours in a variety of fleet support missions for Pacific fleet units and multinational exercises. LT Young qualified as a section leader, instructor pilot and air combat maneuvering pilot while in VC-1, then received orders to Training Squadron Twenty-One (VT-21), NAS Kingsville, Texas. Being a TA-4J flight instructor, she trained student naval aviators in phases of advanced strike training in May 1982.

In May 1986 Lucy Young began training as a Boeing 727 flight engineer (under Piedmont Airlines) in Winston-Salem, North Carolina. In October 1987 she upgraded to first officer on the Boeing 737. Promoted to commander in July 1991, Lucy transferred to VTU-6767 at NAS Atlanta in March 1992. In over six years with VR-46, CDR Young accumulated over 1600 hours in the C-9 and qualified as a transport aircraft commander with over water and international qualification. She is a veteran of Desert Shield/Storm and flew missions to Saudi Arabia, Egypt, Greece and Israel during this conflict.

== See also ==
- Dogfight
- Sully: Young appears in Sully (2016) as a Co-Pilot in the first simulation flight.
