= Illinois Veteran Grant =

Government program

The Illinois Veteran Grant (IVG) is a state-funded financial aid program administered by the state of Illinois. The program provides educational benefits to Illinoisans who have served in the Armed Forces of the United States.

The IVG provides recipients with the full amount of tuition and fees to attend any approved public universities and community colleges in Illinois.

Veterans who were residents in the state of Illinois at least six months before entering military service and who have completed a full year or more of federal active duty (or have served in a designated combat zone) may be eligible for the grant. Qualified applicants may use this grant at the undergraduate or graduate level for the equivalent of four academic years of full-time enrollment. A recent program update allows eligibility for veterans who did not return within six months after discharge if they have been a resident of Illinois for at least 15 consecutive years.
