= Illinois Department of Veterans' Affairs =

Illinois executive agency

IL Department of Veterans' Affairs
- Great Seal of Illinois

Department overview
- Formed: 1976
- Jurisdiction: Illinois
- Headquarters: Springfield, Illinois
- Employees: 1200
- Annual budget: $138,179,100
- Department executives: FORCM, USN(Ret), Terry Prince Director; Anthony Vaughn, USMC, (Ret) Assistant Director
- Website: www2.illinois.gov/veterans/

The Illinois Department of Veterans' Affairs (IDVA) is the department of the Illinois state government that assists veterans and their families in navigating the system of federal state and local resources and benefits, provides long-term health care for eligible veterans, and helps veterans address education, mental health, housing, employment, and other challenges.

== Duties ==
IDVA is an Illinois executive agency, funded and administered under the auspices of the Governor, and operates independently of the U.S. Department of Veterans' Affairs (USDVA). While the USDVA provides the bulk of healthcare and financial benefits for the nation's veterans, IDVA provides critical augmenting programs and services for Illinois veterans. Additionally, IDVA's Veterans Service Officers are experts in both federal and state benefits and resources; they assist veterans in navigating and applying for USDVA and IDVA programs and benefits. IDVA is not a part of the US Department of Veterans Affairs (USDVA, or simply "the VA"). VA medical centers (Jesse Brown, Hines, etc.) and USDVA benefits (disability compensation, etc.) are administered and funded by the federal government. The IDVA team consists of more than 1,200 staff, many of whom are veterans.

- Veteran Service Officers
- Veterans' Home Staff
- Central Office
- Special programs, including Women Veterans, Veterans Cash Grants, home construction, and others.
- State-Approving Agency (SAA)
- Grants/Records

In addition, IDVA serves as a liaison to the U.S. Department of Veterans' Affairs and other federal and Illinois State agencies that provide programs for veterans. The IDVA actively partners with others who help and empower veterans, including educational institutions, county officials, and employment service personnel.

== History ==
Illinois’ long and proud history of service to veterans began in 1886 with the establishment of the Illinois Soldiers’ and Sailors’ Home for Civil War Veterans. Created through legislation enacted in 1945, the Illinois Veterans’ Commission was responsible for state services to veterans until 1976, when it was succeeded by the Illinois Department of Veterans’ Affairs (IDVA). The IDVA, created by Public Act 79-376, is charged with responsibility for the welfare and needs of Illinois veterans, their dependents and survivors. IDVA maintains administrative offices in Springfield and Chicago, four veterans’ homes, and more than 73 full- and part-time field offices servicing the 102 counties of the state.

Through the field offices, veterans and their families obtain assistance in navigating the complex system of federal, state and local resources and benefits. Acting as veterans’ authorized representatives, the Department’s accredited Veteran Service Officers provide counseling and assistance in presenting claims to the United States Department of Veterans Affairs on behalf of veterans and their dependents or survivors; these claims may include disability compensation, education benefits, pensions, insurance, hospitalization and rehabilitation. Services also include confirming veterans’ eligibility for state benefits and services, as well as assisting veterans in coordinating with local, state and federal agencies.

In FY 2014, IDVA was funded to provide skilled nursing care to more than 900 veterans each month through its Veterans’ Homes in Quincy, Manteno, LaSalle, Anna and most recently, Chicago. These facilities primarily provide licensed skilled care beds available to veterans in need of long-term care; Quincy and Anna also have a limited number of domiciliary beds for residents who do not require skilled care. In addition, the Prince Home at Manteno provides a homeless program that can serve up to 15 veterans at any one time. All of IDVA’s Veterans’ Homes are inspected by the U.S. Department of Veterans Affairs and licensed and inspected by the Illinois Department of Public Health.

IDVA assists in coordinating services and activities among state and federal agencies, as well as with non-profit organizations that serve veterans. To accomplish this, IDVA staff serve on a number of statutory committees and task forces and work in partnership with several federal agencies, including the U.S. Department of Veterans Affairs, the U.S. Small Business Administration, and the U.S. Department of Labor. IDVA has established and maintains a network of advocacy with a variety of state agencies including the Department of Employment Security, the Department of Corrections, the Department on Aging, the Department of Commerce and Economic Opportunity, the Department of Public Aid, the Department of Human Services, the Department of Military Affairs, the Department of Children and Family Services, the Department of Public Health and the Department of Healthcare and Family Services.

The Department continues to work with Illinois Joining Forces (IJF), a public-private network which assists service members, veterans, and their families to navigate the “sea of goodwill”; along with the Illinois Association of County Veterans Assistance Commission (IACVAC) and other veteran service organizations. They increased outreach efforts through the agency newsletter, redesigned website and improved access to Veteran Service Officers online; programs, initiatives, and partnerships to address veteran unemployment issue and equip Veteran-Owned Small Businesses; assistance to veterans in accessing training opportunities and transitioning their military training toward state license requirements; expansion of the Women Veterans’ Program; the Veterans Cash Lottery Ticket Grant Program, and Veterans Treatment Courts in various counties

== See also ==
- Illinois Veteran Grant
