= Elections in Illinois =

Elections in Illinois provide for the election of over 40,000 elected seats across over 6,000 units of government.

In a 2020 study, Illinois was ranked as the 4th easiest state for citizens to vote in.

== Election system ==
As of 2026, elections in Illinois are directly administered by 109 election authorities. Six municipalities (Chicago, Rockford, Bloomington, Galesburg, Danville, and East St. Louis) each have an election commission as the local election authority only within that municipality. Outside of those, the county clerk is the local election authority in 101 counties and Peoria County has a separate election commission. The local election authority's tasks include taking voter registration, selecting the polling places, ordering the ballots, training the election judges, overseeing the election itself, and supervising the vote count.

The State Board of Elections (SBE) performs certain statewide election functions. Among its functions are providing uniform instructions, forms, and other material to the election authorities; adopting rules consistent with the other election law in Illinois; and approving the voting machines allowed for use by election authorities in Illinois. The SBE is also the election authority for accepting candidate petitions and nominations for certain state and national offices and for modifications to the Constitution of Illinois and other statewide referendums.

== Elections held ==
United States presidential election results for Illinois
Year	Republican / Whig		Democratic		Third party(ies)	
Year	No.	%	No.	%	No.	%
1824	1,516	32.46%	1,272	27.23%	1,883	40.31%
1828	4,662	32.78%	9,560	67.22%	0	0.00%
1832	6,745	31.40%	14,609	68.01%	127	0.59%
1836	15,220	45.31%	18,369	54.69%	0	0.00%
1840	45,574	48.91%	47,441	50.92%	160	0.17%
1844	45,854	42.05%	58,795	53.91%	4,408	4.04%
1848	52,853	42.42%	55,952	44.91%	15,791	12.67%
1852	64,733	41.77%	80,378	51.87%	9,863	6.36%
1856	96,275	40.23%	105,528	44.09%	37,531	15.68%
1860	172,171	50.69%	160,215	47.17%	7,280	2.14%
1864	189,512	54.42%	158,724	45.58%	0	0.00%
1868	250,304	55.69%	199,116	44.31%	0	0.00%
1872	241,936	56.27%	184,884	43.00%	3,151	0.73%
1876	278,232	50.20%	258,611	46.66%	17,384	3.14%
1880	318,036	51.11%	277,321	44.56%	26,948	4.33%
1884	337,469	50.17%	312,351	46.43%	22,850	3.40%
1888	370,475	49.54%	348,351	46.58%	28,987	3.88%
1892	399,288	45.70%	426,281	48.79%	48,078	5.50%
1896	607,130	55.66%	465,613	42.68%	18,126	1.66%
1900	597,985	52.83%	503,061	44.44%	30,851	2.73%
1904	632,645	58.77%	327,606	30.43%	116,248	10.80%
1908	629,932	54.53%	450,810	39.02%	74,512	6.45%
1912	253,593	22.13%	405,048	35.34%	487,532	42.54%
1916	1,152,549	52.56%	950,229	43.34%	89,929	4.10%
1920	1,420,480	67.81%	534,395	25.51%	139,839	6.68%
1924	1,453,321	58.84%	576,975	23.36%	439,771	17.80%
1928	1,769,141	56.93%	1,313,817	42.28%	24,531	0.79%
1932	1,432,756	42.04%	1,882,304	55.23%	92,866	2.73%
1936	1,570,393	39.69%	2,282,999	57.70%	103,130	2.61%
1940	2,047,240	48.54%	2,149,934	50.97%	20,761	0.49%
1944	1,939,314	48.05%	2,079,479	51.52%	17,268	0.43%
1948	1,961,103	49.22%	1,994,715	50.07%	28,228	0.71%
1952	2,457,327	54.84%	2,013,920	44.94%	9,811	0.22%
1956	2,623,327	59.52%	1,775,682	40.29%	8,398	0.19%
1960	2,368,988	49.80%	2,377,846	49.98%	10,575	0.22%
1964	1,905,946	40.53%	2,796,833	59.47%	62	0.00%
1968	2,174,774	47.08%	2,039,814	44.15%	405,161	8.77%
1972	2,788,179	59.03%	1,913,472	40.51%	21,585	0.46%
1976	2,364,269	50.10%	2,271,295	48.13%	83,269	1.76%
1980	2,358,049	49.65%	1,981,413	41.72%	410,259	8.64%
1984	2,707,103	56.17%	2,086,499	43.30%	25,486	0.53%
1988	2,310,939	50.69%	2,215,940	48.60%	32,241	0.71%
1992	1,734,096	34.34%	2,453,350	48.58%	862,711	17.08%
1996	1,587,021	36.81%	2,341,744	54.32%	382,626	8.87%
2000	2,019,421	42.58%	2,589,026	54.60%	133,676	2.82%
2004	2,345,946	44.48%	2,891,550	54.82%	36,826	0.70%
2008	2,031,179	36.73%	3,419,348	61.83%	79,652	1.44%
2012	2,135,216	40.66%	3,019,512	57.50%	96,704	1.84%
2016	2,146,015	38.35%	3,090,729	55.24%	358,535	6.41%
2020	2,446,891	40.45%	3,471,915	57.39%	130,694	2.16%
2024	2,449,079	43.47%	3,062,863	54.37%	121,368	2.15%

=== Regular elections ===
There are four types of regular elections in Illinois: the general primary election and the general election, which occur in even years, and the consolidated primary election and the consolidated election, which occur in odd years.

The election day for the general election is the Tuesday after the first Monday in November of each even year, which is the day usually associated with election day in the United States. Its associated general primary election is held on the preceding third Tuesday in March.

The election day for the consolidated election is the first Tuesday in April of each odd year, unless that day is during Passover, in which case the election is the first Tuesday after Passover. Its associated consolidated primary election is held on the preceding last Tuesday in February. The consolidated election was established in 1982; before this, many local governments held separate elections on unrelated days at unrelated places.

=== Special elections ===
Illinois statutes limit special elections to specific circumstances, prohibiting all other elections from being held at any other time than for the regular elections.

==== Vacancies ====
===== United States Congress =====
If a seat in the United States House of Representatives becomes vacant more than 240 days before the next general election, the governor chooses a date within 180 days and issues a writ of election to hold a special election on the chosen day for that congressional district.

== Election judges ==
=== Illinois high school student election judges ===
High school students in many states across the country are permitted to serve as election judges (poll workers) in their states, even when the students are not yet old enough to vote. In the 41 states that allow high school students to serve as election judges, the laws typically allow for students to work if they are 16 years of age and in good academic standing at their schools. Specific requirements vary from state to state. Some states do not allow high school students to serve as election judges, or the law has no specific provisions for persons who are not yet eligible to vote. The following states permit high school students to serve as election judges: Alaska, Arizona, Arkansas, California, Colorado, Connecticut, Delaware, District of Columbia, Georgia, Guam, Hawaii, Idaho, Illinois, Kansas, Kentucky, Louisiana, Maine, Maryland, Massachusetts, Michigan, Minnesota, Mississippi, Nebraska, Nevada, New Hampshire, New Jersey, New York, North Carolina, North Dakota, Ohio, Oregon, Pennsylvania, Rhode Island, South Carolina, South Dakota, Tennessee, Texas, Utah, Vermont, West Virginia, Wisconsin, and Wyoming.

The State of Illinois, specifically Chicago, has a robust model. Chicago's contingencies of student judges are the largest in the country. Illinois law provided that students meet the following criteria to serve as Election Judges:

- Be a high school junior or senior in good standing;
- Have a grade point average of at least 3.0 on a 4.0 scale;
- Be a U.S. citizen by Election Day;
- Be able to read, write, and speak English;
- Successfully complete a 4-hour training session;
- Be able to work on Election Day beginning at 5 a.m. until all duties are completed after the polls close;
- Be recommended by his/her high school principal;
- Have the written approval of his/her parent or legal guardian.,

There is no minimum age requirement to serve as a student election judge in Illinois. A maximum of two high school students, 1 from each party, may serve in each precinct. In the City of Chicago, a partnership between the Chicago Board of Elections and Mikva Challenge, a non-partisan civic engagement organization, has contributed to the Election Board leading the nation in the utilization of student judges.

== See also ==
- 2024 Illinois elections
- Politics of Illinois
- Political party strength in Illinois
- Electoral reform in Illinois
- Government of Illinois
- United States presidential elections in Illinois
- Women's suffrage in Illinois

=== Statewide offices ===
- Illinois gubernatorial elections
- Illinois Attorney General elections
- Illinois Comptroller elections

Elected officials

- Illinois General Assembly
  - Illinois Senate
  - Illinois House of Representatives
- Governor of Illinois
- Lieutenant Governor of Illinois
- Illinois Treasurer
- Illinois Attorney General
- Illinois Comptroller
