= 1892 United States presidential election in Illinois =

- November 8, 1892

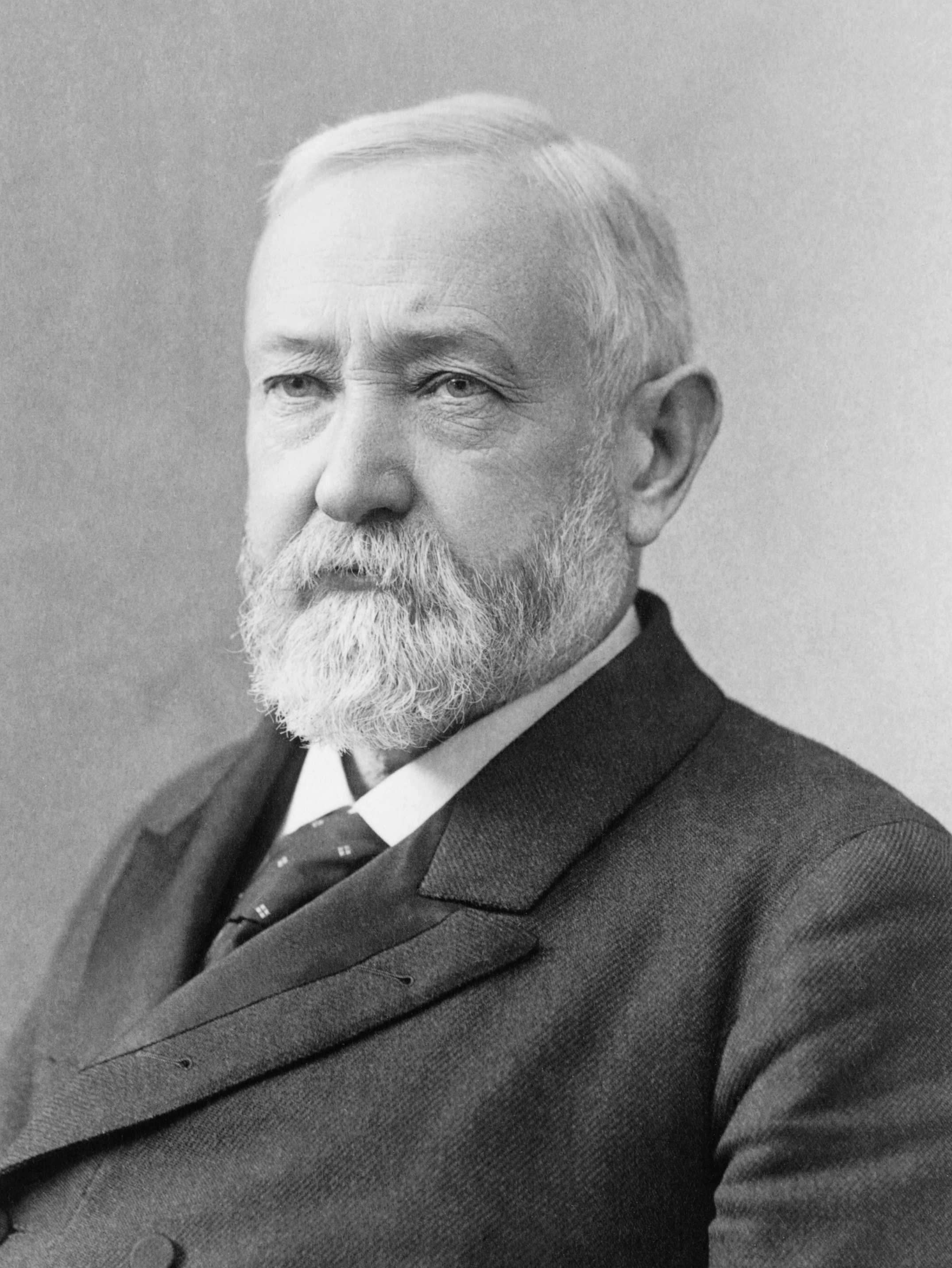
Nominee	Grover Cleveland	Benjamin Harrison
Party	Democratic	Republican
Home state	New York	Indiana
Running mate	Adlai Stevenson I	Whitelaw Reid
Electoral vote	24	0
Popular vote	426,281	399,288
Percentage	48.79%	45.70%
County results
Cleveland
40–50%
50–60%
60–70%
Harrison
40–50%
50–60%
60–70%
70–80%
President before election
Benjamin Harrison
Republican
Elected President
Grover Cleveland
Democratic

The 1892 United States presidential election in Illinois took place on November 8, 1892. All contemporary 44 states were part of the 1892 United States presidential election. State voters chose 24 electors to the Electoral College, which selected the president and vice president.

Illinois was won by the Democratic nominees, former President Grover Cleveland of New York and his running mate Adlai Stevenson I of Illinois. This marked the first time a Democratic candidate won Illinois since 1856 when James Buchanan carried the state. Illinois is one of the three states that voted Republican in both 1884 and 1888 but flipped to Cleveland in 1892, the others being California and Wisconsin.

== Results ==
1892 United States presidential election in Illinois
Party	Candidate	Votes	Percentage	Electoral votes
Democratic	Grover Cleveland	426,281	48.79%	24
Republican	Benjamin Harrison (incumbent)	399,288	45.70%	0
Prohibition	John Bidwell	25,871	2.96%	0
Populist	James B. Weaver	22,207	2.54%	0
Totals		873,647	100.00%	24
Voter turnout				—

== See also ==
- United States presidential elections in Illinois
