= 1820 United States presidential election in Illinois =

- November 1 – December 6, 1820
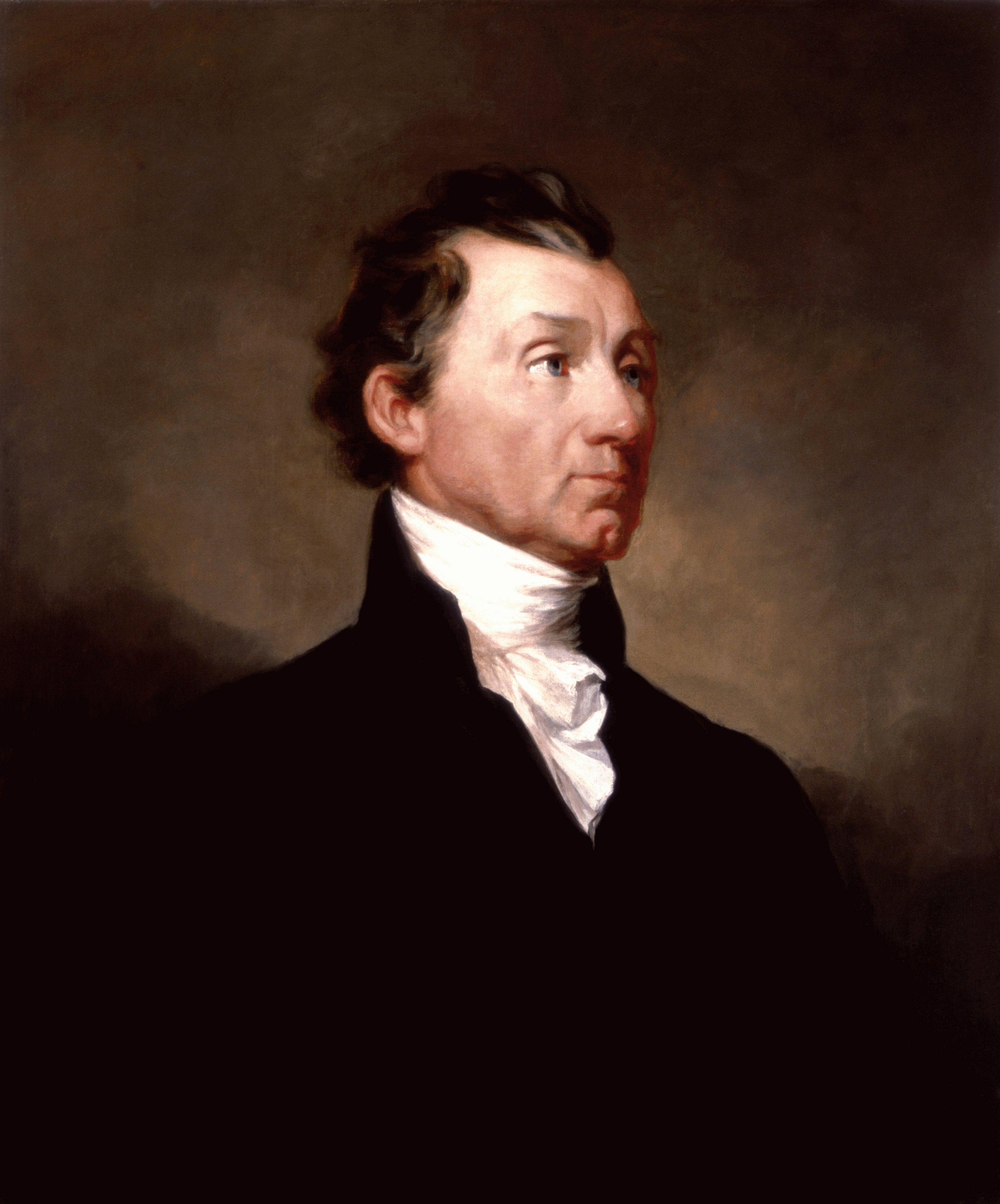

Nominee	James Monroe	Unpledged electors
Party	Democratic-Republican	Independent
Home state	Virginia	N/A
Running mate	Daniel D. Tompkins	N/A
Electoral vote	3	0
Popular vote	866	382
Percentage	69.39%	30.60%
County results
Monroe
50–60%
70–80%
80–90%
90–100%
No candidate
50–60%
80–90%
No data/vote

The 1820 United States presidential election in Illinois took place between November 1 and December 6, 1820, as part of the 1820 United States presidential election. Voters chose three representatives, or electors, to the Electoral College, who voted for president and vice president. It was the first presidential election that Illinois participated in since being admitted to the Union on December 3, 1818.

Illinois cast three electoral votes for the Democratic-Republican candidate and incumbent President James Monroe, as he ran effectively unopposed. The electoral votes for vice president were cast for Monroe's running mate Daniel D. Tompkins from New York. The state was divided into electoral districts with one elector each, and each district's voters chose the electors.

== Results ==
1820 United States presidential election in Illinois
Party	Candidate	Votes	Percentage	Electoral votes
Democratic-Republican	James Monroe (incumbent)	866	69.39%	3
Independent	Unpledged electors	382	30.60%	0
Totals		1,248	100.0%	3

=== Results by county ===
1820 United States presidential election in Illinois (by county)
County	James Monroe Democratic-Republican (Note: Combined totals of James Moore, Michael Jones, and Adolphus F. Hubbard.)		Unpledged electors (Note: Combined totals of Charles Campbell, William Campbell, Peter Kimmel, John Edgar, Elisha Mills, William Kinney, John Y. Sawyer, and Abraham Prewitt.)		Total votes cast
County	#	%	#	%	Total votes cast
Alexander	10	52.63%	9	47.37%	19
Bond	39	49.37%	40	50.63%	79
Crawford	93	91.18%	9	8.82%	102
Edwards	10	100.00%	0	0.00%	10
Franklin	6	42.86%	8	57.14%	14
Gallatin	67	70.53%	28	29.47%	95
Jackson	47	48.96%	49	51.04%	96
Jefferson	30	88.24%	4	11.76%	34
Johnson	6	20.00%	24	80.00%	30
Madison	27	18.88%	116	81.12%	143
Monroe	121	80.67%	29	19.33%	150
Pope	75	100.00%	0	0.00%	75
Randolph	170	79.81%	43	20.19%	213
Union	127	94.07%	8	5.93%	135
Wayne	38	71.70%	15	28.30%	53
Total	866	69.39%	382	30.60%	1,248

== See also ==
- United States presidential elections in Illinois
