= United States presidential elections in Illinois =

US election season

Presidential elections in Illinois
- Number of elections: 51
- Voted Democratic: 26
- Voted Republican: 24
- Voted Democratic-Republican: 2
- Voted other: 0
- Voted for winning candidate: 42
- Voted for losing candidate: 10

Following is a table of United States presidential elections in Illinois, ordered by year. Since its admission to statehood in 1818, Illinois has participated in every U.S. presidential election.

From 1896 to 1996, Illinois was a bellwether state, voting for the winner of the presidential election 24 of 26 times, the exceptions being 1916 and 1976. Since 1992, Illinois has consistently backed Democratic candidates.

Winners of the state are in bold. The shading refers to the state winner, and not the national winner.

== Elections from 1864 to present ==
View source data.

Year	Winner (nationally)	Votes	Percent	Runner-up (nationally)	Votes	Percent	Other national candidates (Note: For purposes of these lists, other national candidates are defined as those who won at least one electoral vote, or won at least ten percent of the vote in multiple states.)	Votes	Percent	Electoral votes	Notes
2024	Donald Trump	2,449,079	43.47	**Kamala Harris**	3,062,863	54.37	-			19	
2020	**Joe Biden**	3,471,915	57.54	Donald Trump	2,446,891	40.55	-			20	
2016	Donald Trump (Note: Won the electoral college while losing the popular vote)	2,146,015	38.36	**Hillary Clinton**	3,090,729	55.24	-			20	
2012	**Barack Obama**	3,019,512	57.60	Mitt Romney	2,135,216	40.73	-			20	
2008	**Barack Obama**	3,419,348	61.92	John McCain	2,031,179	36.78	-			21	
2004	George W. Bush	2,345,946	44.48	**John Kerry**	2,891,550	54.82	-			21	
2000	George W. Bush	2,019,421	42.58	**Al Gore**	2,589,026	54.60	-			22	
1996	**Bill Clinton**	2,341,744	54.32	Bob Dole	1,587,021	36.81	Ross Perot	346,408	8.03	22	
1992	**Bill Clinton**	2,453,350	48.58	George H. W. Bush	1,734,096	34.34	Ross Perot	840,515	16.64	22	
1988	**George H. W. Bush**	2,310,939	50.69	Michael Dukakis	2,215,940	48.60	-			24	
1984	**Ronald Reagan**	2,707,103	56.17	Walter Mondale	2,086,499	43.30	-			24	
1980	**Ronald Reagan**	2,358,049	49.65	Jimmy Carter	1,981,413	41.72	John B. Anderson	346,754	7.30	26	
1976	Jimmy Carter	2,271,295	48.13	**Gerald Ford**	2,364,269	50.10	-			26	
1972	**Richard Nixon**	2,788,179	59.03	George McGovern	1,913,472	40.51	-			26	
1968	**Richard Nixon**	2,174,774	47.08	Hubert Humphrey	2,039,814	44.15	George Wallace	390,958	8.46	26	
1964	**Lyndon B. Johnson**	2,796,833	59.47	Barry Goldwater	1,905,946	40.53	-			26	
1960	**John F. Kennedy**	2,377,846	49.98	Richard Nixon	2,368,988	49.80	-			27	
1956	**Dwight D. Eisenhower**	2,623,327	59.52	Adlai Stevenson II	1,775,682	40.29	T. Coleman Andrews/ Unpledged Electors (Note: Was allied with a slate of unpledged electors in Louisiana, Mississippi and South Carolina)	-		27	
1952	**Dwight D. Eisenhower**	2,457,327	54.84	Adlai Stevenson II	2,013,920	44.94	-			27	
1948	**Harry S. Truman**	1,994,715	50.07	Thomas E. Dewey	1,961,103	49.22	Strom Thurmond	-		28	
1944	**Franklin D. Roosevelt**	2,079,479	51.52	Thomas E. Dewey	1,939,314	48.05	-			28	
1940	**Franklin D. Roosevelt**	2,149,934	50.97	Wendell Willkie	2,047,240	48.54	-			29	
1936	**Franklin D. Roosevelt**	2,282,999	57.70	Alf Landon	1,570,393	39.69	-			29	
1932	**Franklin D. Roosevelt**	1,882,304	55.23	Herbert Hoover	1,432,756	42.04	-			29	
1928	**Herbert Hoover**	1,769,141	56.93	Al Smith	1,313,817	42.28	-			29	
1924	**Calvin Coolidge**	1,453,321	58.84	John W. Davis	576,975	23.36	Robert M. La Follette	432,027	17.49	29	
1920	**Warren G. Harding**	1,420,480	67.81	James M. Cox	534,395	25.51	Parley P. Christensen	49,630	2.37	29	
1916	Woodrow Wilson	950,229	43.34	**Charles E. Hughes**	1,152,549	52.56	-			29	
1912	**Woodrow Wilson**	405,048	35.34	Theodore Roosevelt	386,478	33.72	William H. Taft	253,593	22.13	29	
1908	**William H. Taft**	629,932	54.53	William Jennings Bryan	450,810	39.02	-			27	
1904	**Theodore Roosevelt**	632,645	58.77	Alton B. Parker	327,606	30.43	-			27	
1900	**William McKinley**	597,985	52.83	William Jennings Bryan	503,061	44.44	-			24	
1896	**William McKinley**	607,130	55.66	William Jennings Bryan	465,613	42.68	-			24	
1892	**Grover Cleveland**	426,281	48.79	Benjamin Harrison	399,288	45.70	James B. Weaver	22,207	2.54	24	
1888	**Benjamin Harrison**	370,475	49.54	Grover Cleveland	348,351	46.58	-			22	
1884	Grover Cleveland	312,351	46.43	**James G. Blaine**	337,469	50.17	-			22	
1880	**James A. Garfield**	318,036	51.11	Winfield S. Hancock	277,321	44.56	James B. Weaver	26,358	4.24	21	
1876	**Rutherford B. Hayes**	278,232	50.20	Samuel J. Tilden	258,611	46.66	-			21	
1872	**Ulysses S. Grant**	241,936	56.27	Horace Greeley	184,884	43.00	-			21	
1868	**Ulysses S. Grant**	250,304	55.7	Horatio Seymour	199,116	44.3	-			16	
1864	**Abraham Lincoln**	189,512	54.4	George B. McClellan	158,724	45.6	-			16	

== Election of 1860 ==
The election of 1860 was a complex realigning election in which the breakdown of the previous two-party alignment culminated in four parties each competing for influence in different parts of the country. The result of the election, with the victory of an ardent opponent of slavery, spurred the secession of eleven states and brought about the American Civil War.

Year	Winner (nationally)	Votes	Percent	Runner-up (nationally)	Votes	Percent	Runner-up (nationally)	Votes	Percent	Runner-up (nationally)	Votes	Percent	Electoral votes
1860	**Abraham Lincoln**	172,171	50.7	Stephen A. Douglas	160,215	47.2	John C. Breckinridge	2,331	0.7	John Bell	4,914	1.4	11

== Elections from 1828 to 1856 ==
Year	Winner (nationally)	Votes	Percent	Runner-up (nationally)	Votes	Percent	Other national candidates	Votes	Percent	Electoral votes	Notes
1856	**James Buchanan**	105,528	44.09	John C. Frémont	96,275	40.23	Millard Fillmore	37,531	15.68	11	
1852	**Franklin Pierce**	80,378	51.87	Winfield Scott	64,733	41.77	John P. Hale	9,863	6.36	11	
1848	Zachary Taylor	52,853	42.42	**Lewis Cass**	55,952	44.91	Martin Van Buren	15,702	12.6	9	
1844	**James K. Polk**	58,795	53.91	Henry Clay	45,854	42.05	-			9	
1840	William Henry Harrison	45,574	48.91	**Martin Van Buren**	47,441	50.92	-			5	
1836	**Martin Van Buren**	18,369	54.69	William Henry Harrison	15,220	45.31	various (Note: Three other candidates ran and received electoral votes nationally as part of the unsuccessful Whig strategy to defeat Martin Van Buren by running four candidates with local appeal in different regions of the country. The others were Hugh Lawson White, Daniel Webster, and Willie Person Mangum. None of these candidates appeared on the ballot in Illinois.)			5	
1832	**Andrew Jackson**	14,609	68.01	Henry Clay	6,745	31.40	William Wirt	97	0.45	5	
1828	**Andrew Jackson**	9,560	67.22	John Quincy Adams	4,662	32.78	-			3	

== Election of 1824 ==
The election of 1824 was a complex realigning election following the collapse of the prevailing Democratic-Republican Party, resulting in four different candidates each claiming to carry the banner of the party, and competing for influence in different parts of the country. The election was the only one in history to be decided by the House of Representatives under the provisions of the Twelfth Amendment to the United States Constitution after no candidate secured a majority of the electoral vote. It was also the only presidential election in which the candidate who received a plurality of electoral votes (Andrew Jackson) did not become president, a source of great bitterness for Jackson and his supporters, who proclaimed the election of Adams a corrupt bargain.

Year	Winner (nationally)	Votes	Percent	Runner-up (nationally)	Votes	Percent	Runner-up (nationally)	Votes	Percent	Runner-up (nationally)	Votes	Percent	Electoral votes
1824	Andrew Jackson	1,272	27.23	**John Quincy Adams**	1,516	32.46	Henry Clay	1,036	22.18	William H. Crawford	847	18.13	3 (Electoral College split, 2 for Jackson and 1 for Adams)

== Election of 1820 ==
In the election of 1820, incumbent President James Monroe ran effectively unopposed, winning all electoral votes (including the three electoral votes from Illinois) except one electoral vote in New Hampshire. The popular vote was primarily directed to filling the office of vice president.

== See also ==
- Elections in Illinois
