= 1876 United States presidential election in Illinois =

- November 7, 1876
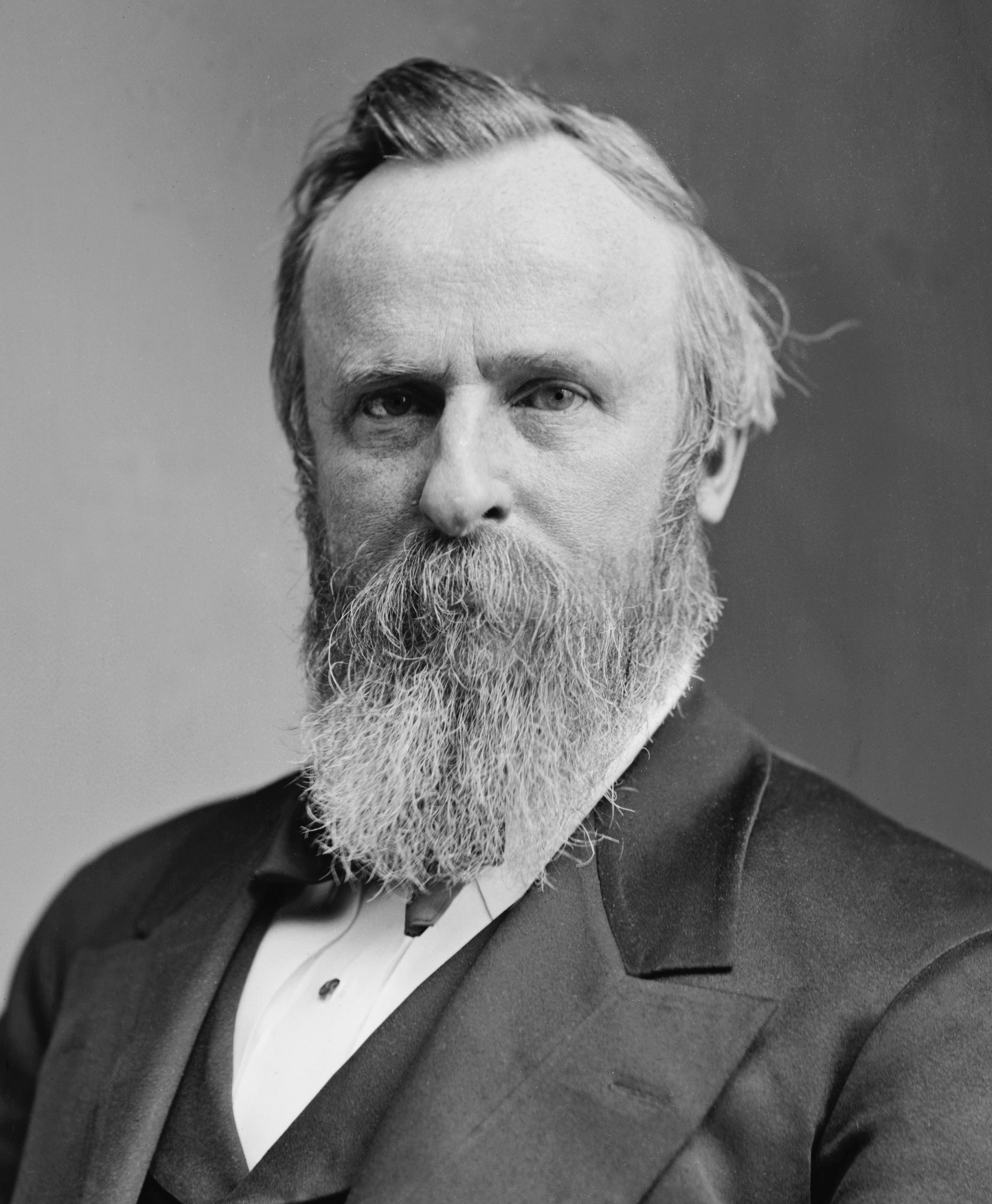

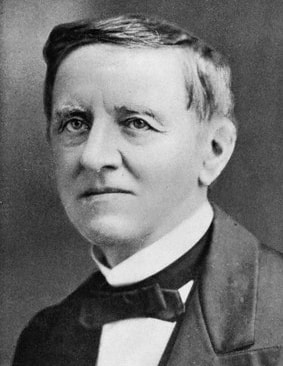
Nominee	Rutherford B. Hayes	Samuel J. Tilden
Party	Republican	Democratic
Home state	Ohio	New York
Running mate	William A. Wheeler	Thomas A. Hendricks
Electoral vote	21	0
Popular vote	278,232	258,611
Percentage	50.20%	46.66%
County results
Hayes
40–50%
50–60%
60–70%
70–80%
80–90%
Tilden
40–50%
50–60%
60–70%
President before election
Ulysses S. Grant
Republican
Elected President
Rutherford B. Hayes
Republican

The 1876 United States presidential election in Illinois took place on November 7, 1876, as part of the 1876 United States presidential election. Voters chose 21 representatives, or electors to the Electoral College, who voted for president and vice president.

Illinois voted for the Republican nominee, Rutherford B. Hayes, over the Democratic nominee, Samuel J. Tilden. Hayes won the state by a narrow margin of 3.54%.

== Results ==
1876 United States presidential election in Illinois
Party	Candidate	Running mate	Popular vote		Electoral vote	
Party	Candidate	Running mate	Count	%	Count	%
Republican	Rutherford B. Hayes of Ohio	William A. Wheeler of New York	278,232	50.20%	21	100.00%
Democratic	Samuel J. Tilden of New York	Thomas A. Hendricks of Indiana	258,611	46.66%	0	0.00%
Greenback	Peter Cooper of New York	Samuel Fenton Cary of Ohio	17,207	3.10%	0	0.00%
Anti-Masonic	James Walker of Illinois	Donald Kirkpatrick of New York	177	0.03%	0	0.00%
Total			554,227	100.00%	21	100.00%

== See also ==
- United States presidential elections in Illinois
