= 1856 United States presidential election in Illinois =

- November 4, 1856
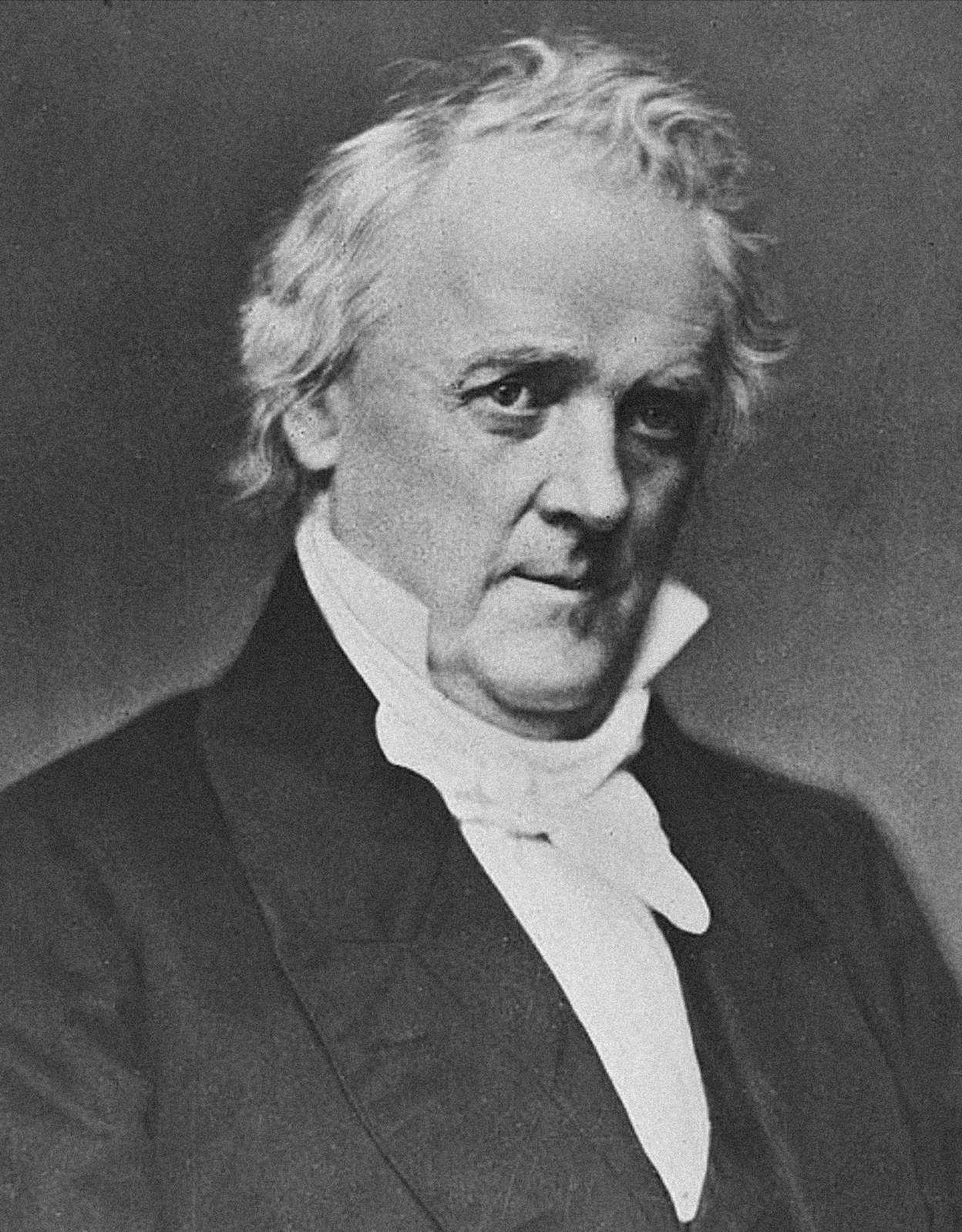

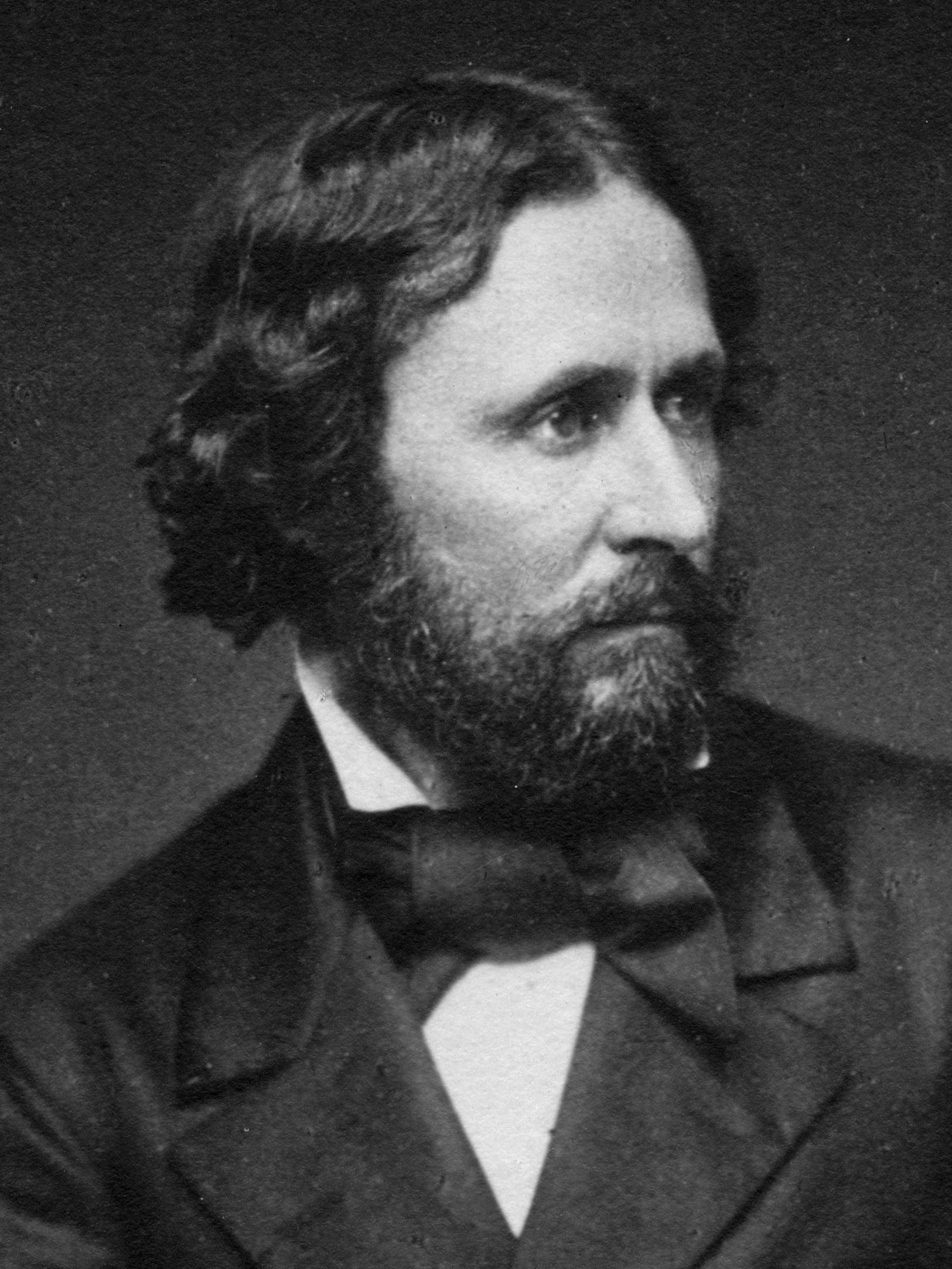

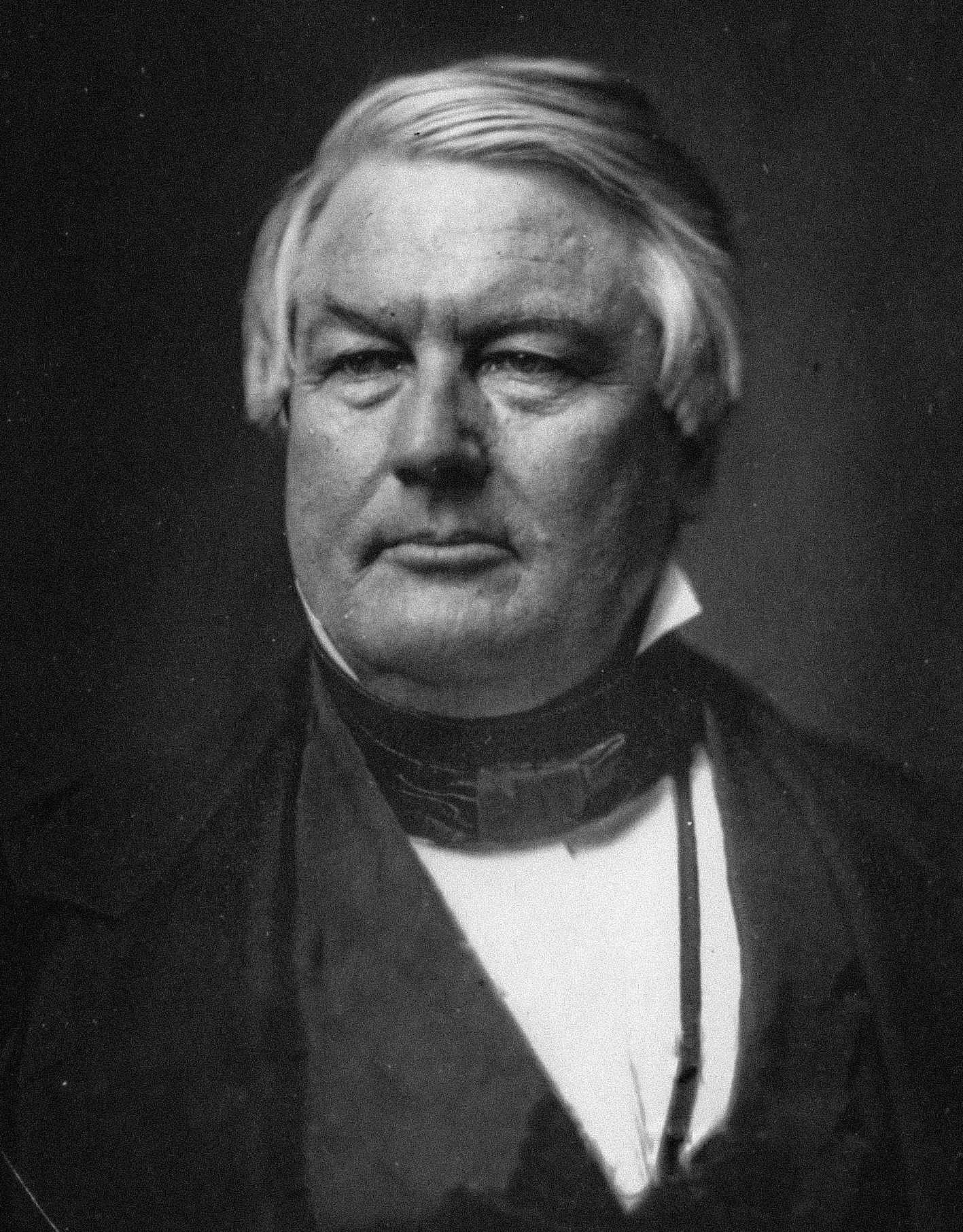
Nominee	James Buchanan	John C. Frémont	Millard Fillmore
Party	Democratic	Republican	Know Nothing
Home state	Pennsylvania	California	New York
Running mate	John C. Breckinridge	William L. Dayton	Andrew Jackson Donelson
Electoral vote	11	0	0
Popular vote	105,528	96,275	37,531
Percentage	44.09%	40.23%	15.68%
County results
Buchanan
40–50%
50–60%
60–70%
70–80%
80–90%
90–100%
Fremont
40–50%
50–60%
60–70%
70–80%
80–90%
Fillmore
40–50%
President before election
Franklin Pierce
Democratic
Elected President
James Buchanan
Democratic

The 1856 United States presidential election in Illinois took place on November 4, 1856, as part of the 1856 United States presidential election. Voters chose 11 representatives, or electors to the Electoral College, who voted for president and vice president.

Illinois voted for the Democratic candidate, James Buchanan, over Republican candidate John C. Frémont and American Party candidate Millard Fillmore. Buchanan won Illinois by a narrow margin of 3.86%.

This would be the final time a Democratic presidential candidate would win Illinois until Grover Cleveland won it in 1892.

== Results ==
1856 United States presidential election in Illinois
Party	Candidate	Votes	%
Democratic	James Buchanan	105,528	44.09%
Republican	John C. Fremont	96,275	40.23%
Know Nothing	Millard Fillmore	37,531	15.68%
Total votes		239,334	100%

=== Results by County ===
1856 United States Presidential Election in Illinois (By County)
County	James Buchanan Democratic		John C. Frémont Republican		Millard Fillmore Know Nothing		Total votes cast
County	#	%	#	%	#	%	Total votes cast
Adams	3,311	53.76%	2,226	36.14%	622	10.10%	6,159
Alexander	401	62.07%	15	2.32%	230	35.60%	646
Bond	607	42.78%	153	10.78%	659	46.44%	1,419
Boone	243	12.04%	1,748	86.62%	27	1.34%	2,018
Brown	903	60.00%	169	11.23%	433	28.77%	1,505
Bureau	1,234	31.76%	2,603	67.00%	48	1.24%	3,885
Calhoun	391	62.66%	70	11.22%	163	26.12%	624
Carroll	237	15.28%	1,161	74.85%	153	9.86%	1,551
Cass	914	55.23%	303	18.31%	438	26.47%	1,655
Champaign	550	36.23%	732	48.22%	236	15.55%	1,518
Christian	884	62.17%	239	16.81%	299	21.03%	1,422
Clark	1,318	55.92%	709	30.08%	330	14.00%	2,357
Clay	731	56.23%	29	2.23%	540	41.54%	1,300
Clinton	840	61.63%	161	11.81%	362	26.56%	1,363
Coles	1,178	42.73%	783	28.40%	796	28.87%	2,757
Cook	5,680	37.76%	9,020	59.97%	342	2.27%	15,042
Crawford	961	57.13%	477	28.36%	244	14.51%	1,682
Cumberland	641	57.13%	246	21.93%	235	20.94%	1,122
DeKalb	381	14.06%	2,254	83.17%	75	2.77%	2,710
DeWitt	679	40.42%	623	37.08%	378	22.50%	1,680
DuPage	542	28.07%	1,387	71.83%	2	0.10%	1,931
Edgar	1,342	51.58%	952	36.59%	308	11.84%	2,602
Edwards	283	36.80%	176	22.89%	310	40.31%	769
Effingham	784	75.60%	90	8.68%	163	15.72%	1,037
Fayette	947	52.21%	68	3.75%	799	44.05%	1,814
Franklin	1,051	80.41%	5	0.38%	251	19.20%	1,307
Fulton	2,724	48.27%	2,021	35.81%	898	15.91%	5,643
Gallatin	764	63.09%	24	1.98%	423	34.93%	1,211
Greene	1,565	61.88%	245	9.69%	719	28.43%	2,529
Grundy	618	39.95%	923	59.66%	6	0.39%	1,547
Hamilton	1,135	86.91%	9	0.69%	162	12.40%	1,306
Hancock	2,011	48.69%	1,120	27.12%	999	24.19%	4,130
Hardin	332	58.76%	4	0.71%	229	40.53%	565
Henderson	610	40.13%	757	49.80%	153	10.07%	1,520
Henry	876	30.77%	1,924	67.58%	47	1.65%	2,847
Iroquois	460	34.90%	750	56.90%	108	8.19%	1,318
Jackson	1,056	75.86%	14	1.01%	322	23.13%	1,392
Jasper	679	58.53%	323	27.84%	158	13.62%	1,160
Jefferson	1,278	72.45%	60	3.40%	426	24.15%	1,764
Jersey	702	43.36%	387	23.90%	530	32.74%	1,619
Jo Daviess	1,509	41.20%	2,110	57.60%	44	1.20%	3,663
Johnson	1,144	93.77%	2	0.16%	74	6.07%	1,220
Kane	912	19.44%	3,750	79.94%	29	0.62%	4,691
Kankakee	258	15.14%	1,386	81.34%	60	3.52%	1,704
Kendall	334	16.96%	1,622	82.38%	13	0.66%	1,969
Knox	1,490	32.27%	2,851	61.74%	277	6.00%	4,618
Lake	558	19.14%	2,347	80.51%	10	0.34%	2,915
LaSalle	2,665	40.96%	3,721	57.18%	121	1.86%	6,507
Lawrence	729	53.96%	89	6.59%	533	39.45%	1,351
Lee	601	24.66%	1,804	74.03%	32	1.31%	2,437
Livingston	480	42.22%	585	51.45%	72	6.33%	1,137
Logan	823	41.95%	655	33.38%	484	24.67%	1,962
Macon	821	47.90%	500	29.17%	393	22.93%	1,714
Macoupin	1,778	49.24%	823	22.79%	1,010	27.97%	3,611
Madison	1,451	34.38%	1,111	26.33%	1,658	39.29%	4,220
Marion	1,150	67.13%	150	8.76%	413	24.11%	1,713
Marshall	834	42.62%	1,008	51.51%	115	5.88%	1,957
Mason	737	47.33%	267	17.15%	553	35.52%	1,557
Massac	630	71.11%	5	0.56%	251	28.33%	886
McDonough	1,370	48.51%	590	20.89%	864	30.59%	2,824
McHenry	945	24.50%	2,869	74.38%	43	1.11%	3,857
McLean	1,517	37.79%	1,937	48.26%	560	13.95%	4,014
Menard	854	52.36%	109	6.68%	668	40.96%	1,631
Mercer	769	37.51%	1,141	55.66%	140	6.83%	2,050
Monroe	900	51.02%	346	19.61%	518	29.37%	1,764
Montgomery	992	53.91%	162	8.80%	686	37.28%	1,840
Morgan	1,656	47.26%	963	27.48%	885	25.26%	3,504
Moultrie	432	48.48%	154	17.28%	305	34.23%	891
Ogle	734	21.02%	2,469	70.70%	289	8.28%	3,492
Peoria	2,459	49.86%	2,082	42.21%	391	7.93%	4,932
Perry	671	51.46%	200	15.34%	433	33.21%	1,304
Piatt	310	41.61%	85	11.41%	350	46.98%	745
Pike	2,163	51.18%	1,053	24.92%	1,010	23.90%	4,226
Pope	855	79.17%	11	1.02%	214	19.81%	1,080
Pulaski	473	71.67%	21	3.18%	166	25.15%	660
Putnam	307	32.18%	532	55.77%	115	12.05%	954
Randolph	1,222	49.33%	709	28.62%	546	22.04%	2,477
Richland	786	62.13%	39	3.08%	440	34.78%	1,265
Rock Island	1,114	39.38%	1,439	50.87%	276	9.76%	2,829
Saline	1,004	81.16%	4	0.32%	229	18.51%	1,237
Sangamon	2,475	47.04%	1,174	22.32%	1,612	30.64%	5,261
Schuyler	1,369	58.83%	388	16.67%	570	24.50%	2,327
Scott	843	53.97%	183	11.72%	536	34.31%	1,562
Shelby	1,414	70.10%	152	7.54%	451	22.36%	2,017
St. Clair	1,728	36.79%	1,996	42.50%	973	20.72%	4,697
Stark	353	28.86%	718	58.71%	152	12.43%	1,223
Stephenson	1,308	40.06%	1,907	58.41%	50	1.53%	3,265
Tazewell	1,313	42.38%	1,028	33.18%	757	24.44%	3,098
Union	1,283	81.46%	46	2.92%	246	15.62%	1,575
Vermilion	1,111	39.52%	1,506	53.58%	194	6.90%	2,811
Wabash	481	44.21%	122	11.21%	485	44.58%	1,088
Warren	1,117	41.28%	1,282	47.38%	307	11.35%	2,706
Washington	1,132	68.23%	244	14.71%	283	17.06%	1,659
Wayne	1,218	69.64%	129	7.38%	402	22.98%	1,749
White	1,062	54.91%	27	1.40%	845	43.69%	1,934
Whiteside	613	22.50%	1,902	69.80%	210	7.71%	2,725
Will	1,575	39.59%	2,393	60.16%	10	0.25%	3,978
Williamson	1,419	87.76%	10	0.62%	188	11.63%	1,617
Winnebago	457	11.00%	3,636	87.53%	61	1.47%	4,154
Woodford	747	48.76%	596	38.90%	189	12.34%	1,532
Totals	105,528	44.09%	96,275	40.23%	37,531	15.68%	239,334

== See also ==
- United States presidential elections in Illinois
