= 1868 United States presidential election in Illinois =

- November 3, 1868
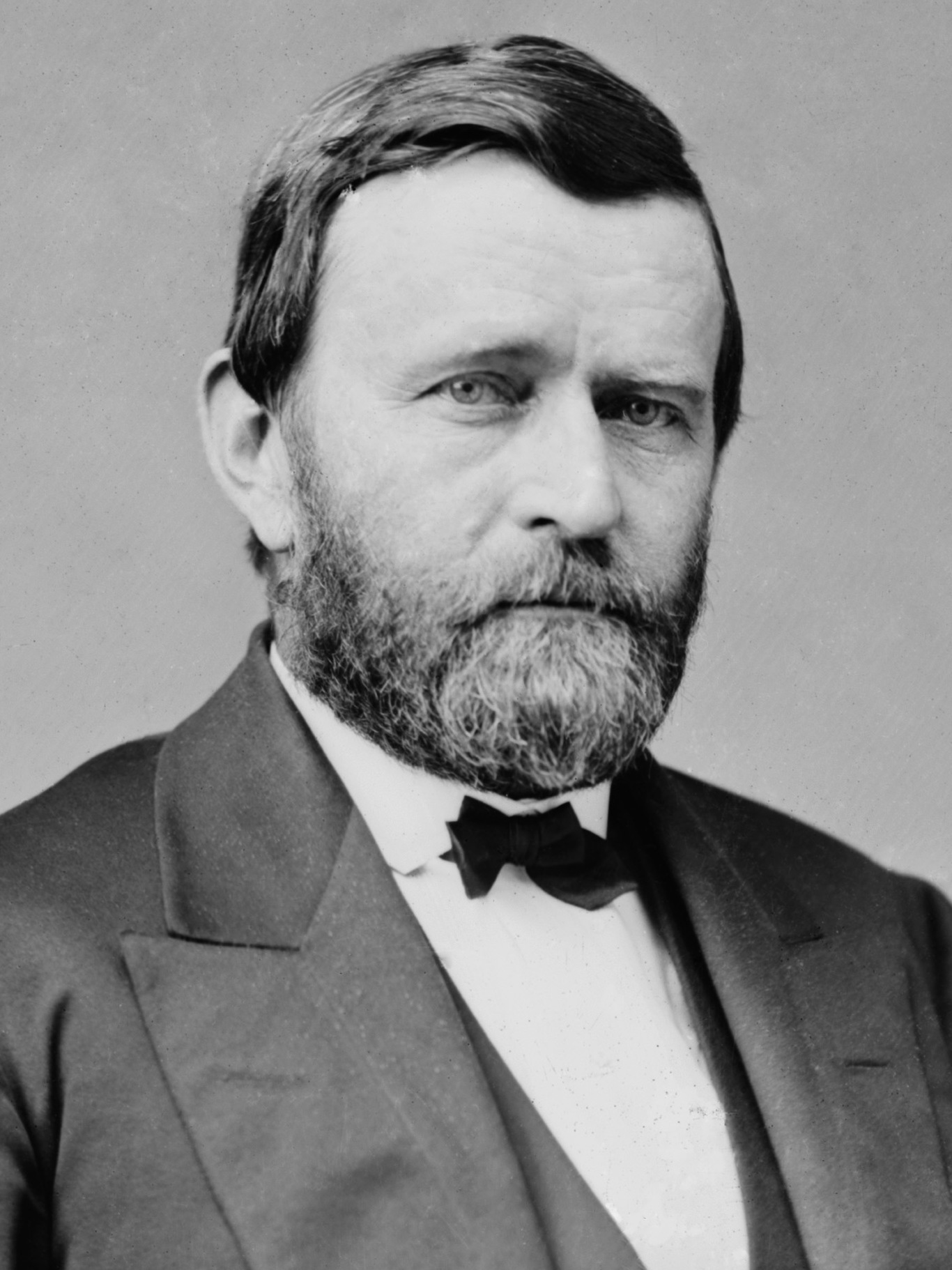

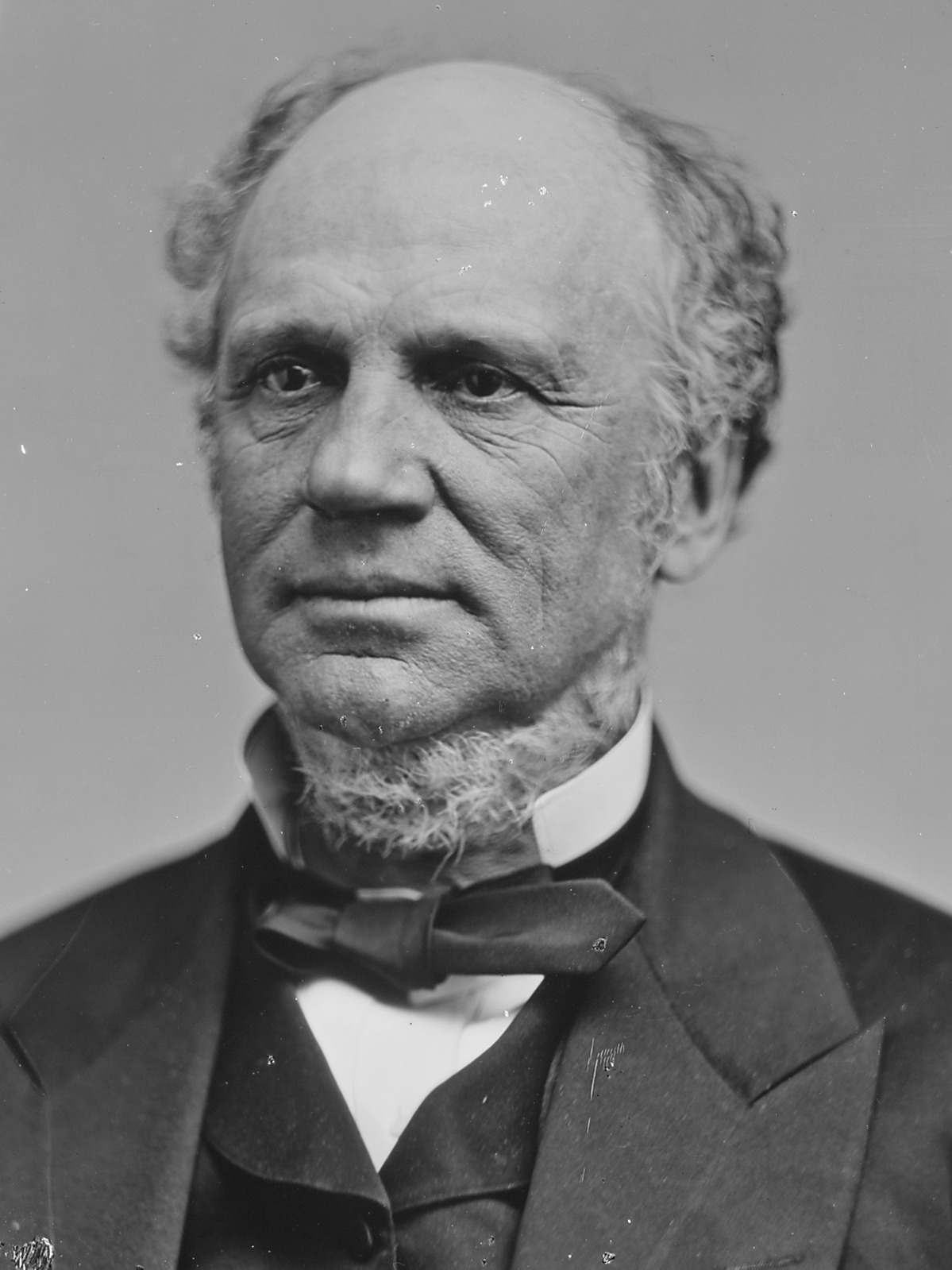
Nominee	Ulysses S. Grant	Horatio Seymour
Party	Republican	Democratic
Home state	Illinois	New York
Running mate	Schuyler Colfax	Francis Preston Blair Jr.
Electoral vote	16	0
Popular vote	250,304	199,116
Percentage	55.69%	44.31%
County results
Grant
50–60%
60–70%
70–80%
80–90%
Seymour
50–60%
60–70%
President before election
Andrew Johnson
Democratic
Elected President
Ulysses S. Grant
Republican

The 1868 United States presidential election in Illinois took place on November 3, 1868, as part of the 1868 United States presidential election. Voters chose 16 representatives, or electors to the Electoral College, who voted for president and vice president.

Illinois voted for the Republican nominee, Ulysses S. Grant, over the Democratic nominee, Horatio Seymour. Grant won his home state by a margin of 11.38%.

== Results ==
1868 United States presidential election in Illinois
Party	Candidate	Running mate	Popular vote		Electoral vote	
Party	Candidate	Running mate	Count	%	Count	%
Republican	Ulysses S. Grant of Illinois	Schuyler Colfax of Indiana	250,304	55.69%	16	100.00%
Democratic	Horatio Seymour of New York	Francis Preston Blair Jr. of Missouri	199,116	44.31%	0	0.00%
Total			449,420	100.00%	16	100.00%

== See also ==
- United States presidential elections in Illinois
