= 1880 United States presidential election in Illinois =

- November 2, 1880
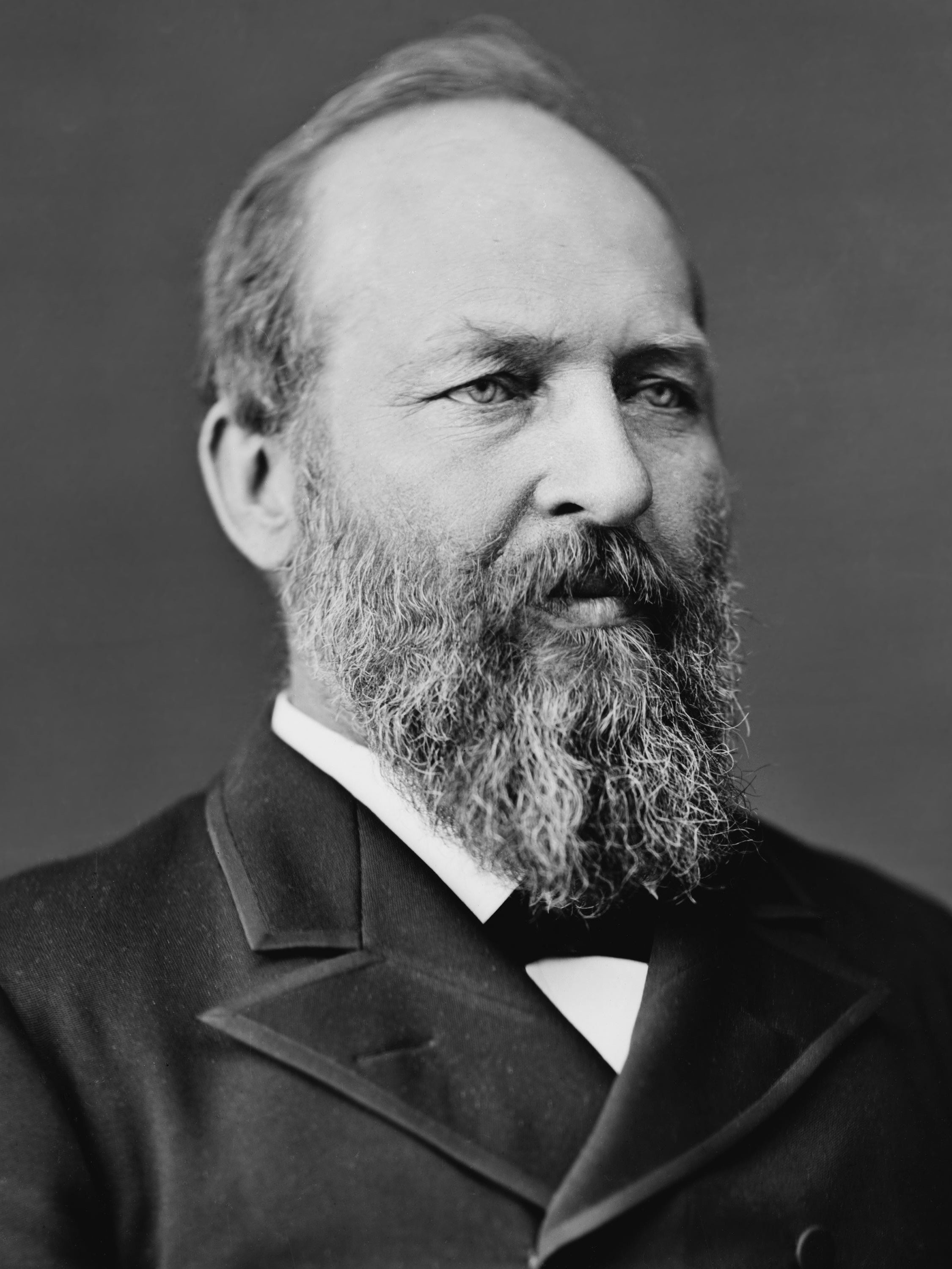

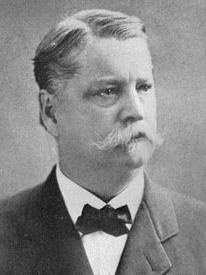
Nominee	James A. Garfield	Winfield Scott Hancock
Party	Republican	Democratic
Home state	Ohio	Pennsylvania
Running mate	Chester A. Arthur	William Hayden English
Electoral vote	21	0
Popular vote	318,036	277,321
Percentage	51.11%	44.56%
County results
Garfield
40–50%
50–60%
60–70%
70–80%
80–90%
Hancock
40–50%
50–60%
60–70%
President before election
Rutherford B. Hayes
Republican
Elected President
James A. Garfield
Republican

The 1880 United States presidential election in Illinois took place on November 2, 1880, as part of the 1880 United States presidential election. Voters chose 21 representatives, or electors to the Electoral College, who voted for president and vice president.

Illinois voted for the Republican nominee, James A. Garfield, over the Democratic nominee, Winfield Scott Hancock. Garfield won the state by a margin of 6.55%.

== Results ==
1880 United States presidential election in Illinois
Party	Candidate	Running mate	Popular vote		Electoral vote	
Party	Candidate	Running mate	Count	%	Count	%
Republican	James Abram Garfield of Ohio	Chester Alan Arthur of New York	318,036	51.11%	21	100.00%
Democratic	Winfield Scott Hancock of Pennsylvania	William Hayden English of Indiana	277,321	44.56%	0	0.00%
Greenback	James Baird Weaver of Iowa	Barzillai Jefferson Chambers of Texas	26,358	4.24%	0	0.00%
Prohibition	Neal Dow of Maine	Henry Adams Thompson of Ohio	440	0.07%	0	0.00%
Anti-Masonic	John Wolcott Phelps of Vermont	Samuel Clarke Pomeroy of Kansas	150	0.02%	0	0.00%
Total			622,305	100.00%	21	100.00%

== See also ==
- United States presidential elections in Illinois
