= 1872 United States presidential election in Illinois =

- November 5, 1872
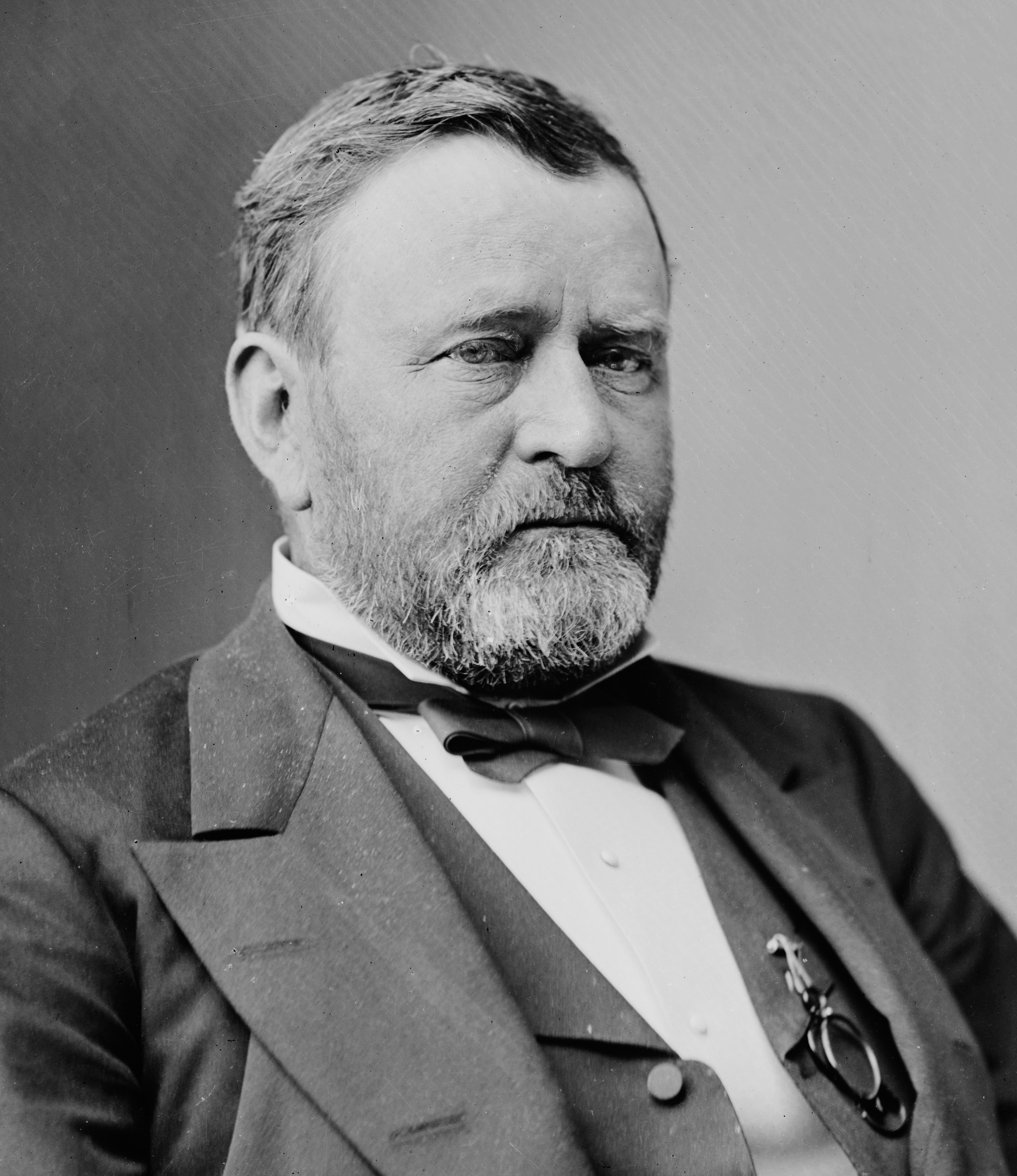

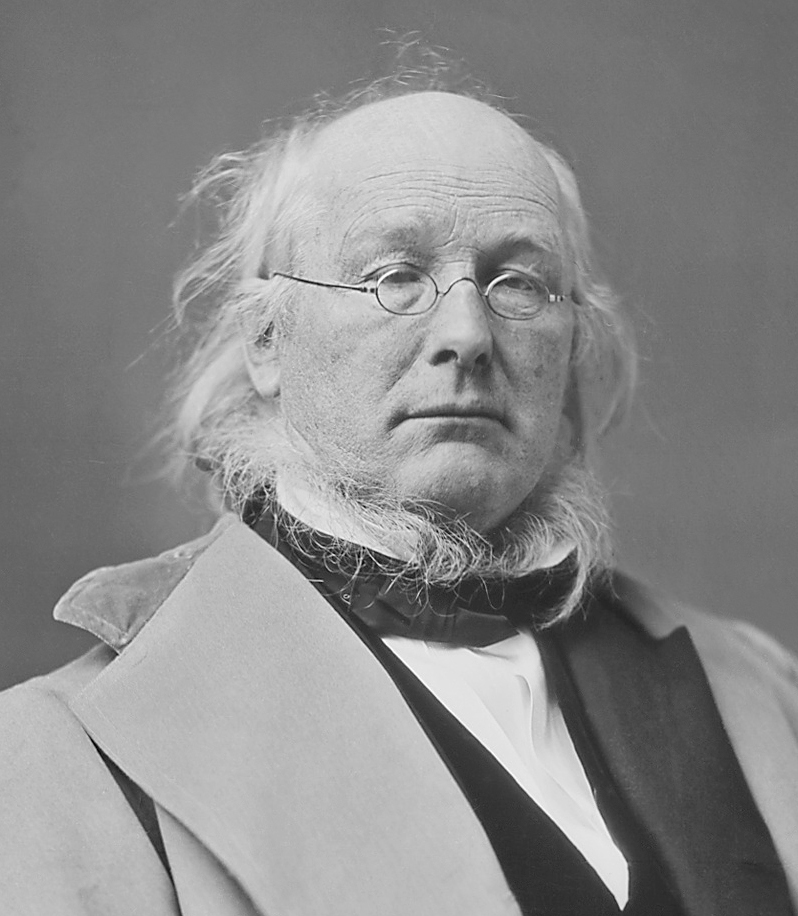
| Nominee | Ulysses S. Grant | Horace Greeley |
| Party | Republican | Liberal Republican |
| Home state | Illinois | New York |
| Running mate | Henry Wilson | Benjamin G. Brown |
| Electoral vote | 21 | 0 |
| Popular vote | 241,936 | 184,884 |
| Percentage | 56.27% | 43.00% |
County results
Grant
40–50%
50–60%
60–70%
70–80%
80–90%
Greeley
40–50%
50–60%
60–70%
70–80%
Tie
President before election
Ulysses S. Grant
Republican
Elected President
Ulysses S. Grant
Republican

The 1872 United States presidential election in Illinois took place on November 5, 1872. All contemporary 37 states were part of the 1872 United States presidential election. The state voters chose 21 electors to the Electoral College, which selected the president and vice president.

Illinois was won by the Republican nominees, incumbent President Ulysses S. Grant of Illinois and his running mate Senator Henry Wilson of Massachusetts. Grant and Wilson defeated the Liberal Republican and Democratic nominees, former Congressman Horace Greeley of New York and his running mate former Senator and Governor Benjamin Gratz Brown of Missouri.

Grant won his home state by a margin of 13.27%.

== Results ==
1872 United States presidential election in Illinois
| Party | Candidate | Running mate | Popular vote | | Electoral vote | |
| Party | Candidate | Running mate | Count | % | Count | % |
|---|---|---|---|---|---|---|
| Republican | Ulysses S. Grant of Illinois | Henry Wilson of Massachusetts | 241,936 | 56.27% | 21 | 100.00% |
| Liberal Republican | Horace Greeley of New York | Benjamin Gratz Brown of Missouri | 184,884 | 43.00% | 0 | 0.00% |
| Bourbon Democrat | Charles O'Conor | John Quincy Adams II | 3,151 | 0.73% | 0 | 0.00% |
| Total | | | 429,971 | 100.00% | 21 | 100.00% |

== See also ==
- United States presidential elections in Illinois
