= 1828 United States presidential election in Illinois =

- October 31 – December 2, 1828

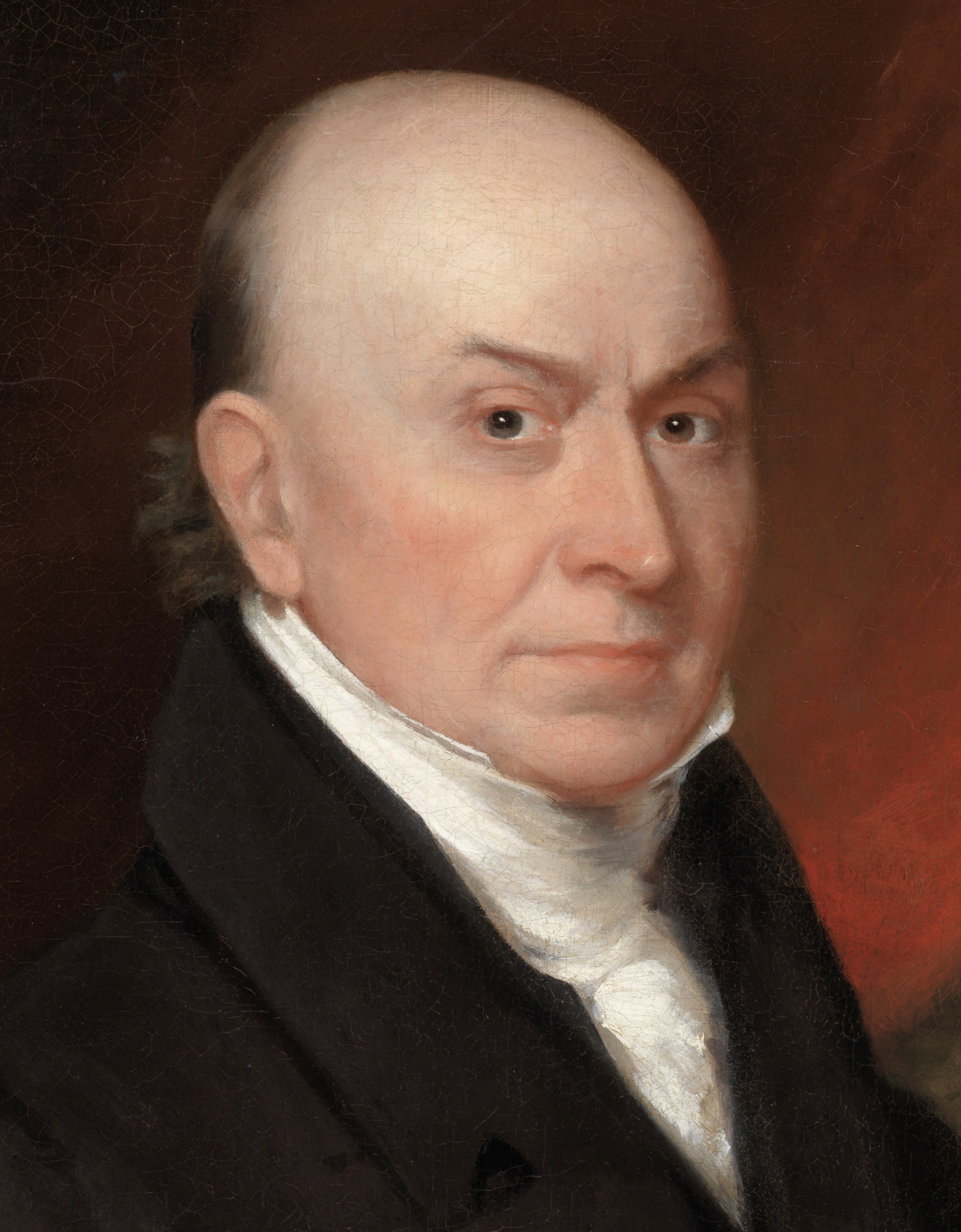
Nominee	Andrew Jackson	John Quincy Adams
Party	Democratic	National Republican
Home state	Tennessee	Massachusetts
Running mate	John C. Calhoun	Richard Rush
Electoral vote	3	0
Popular vote	9,560	4,662
Percentage	67.22%	32.78%
County results
Jackson
50–60%
60–70%
70–80%
80–90%
90–100%
Adams
50–60%
60–70%
No Data/Vote

The 1828 United States presidential election in Illinois took place between October 31 and December 2, 1828, as part of the 1828 United States presidential election. Voters chose three representatives, or electors to the Electoral College, who voted for president and vice president.

Illinois voted for the Democratic candidate, Andrew Jackson, over the National Republican candidate, John Quincy Adams. Jackson won Illinois by a margin of 34.44%.

== Results ==
1828 United States presidential election in Illinois
Party	Candidate	Votes	Percentage	Electoral votes
Democratic	Andrew Jackson	9,560	67.22%	3
National Republican	John Quincy Adams (incumbent)	4,662	32.78%	0
Totals		14,222	100.0%	3

== See also ==
- United States presidential elections in Illinois
