= 1836 United States presidential election in Illinois =

- November 7, 1836
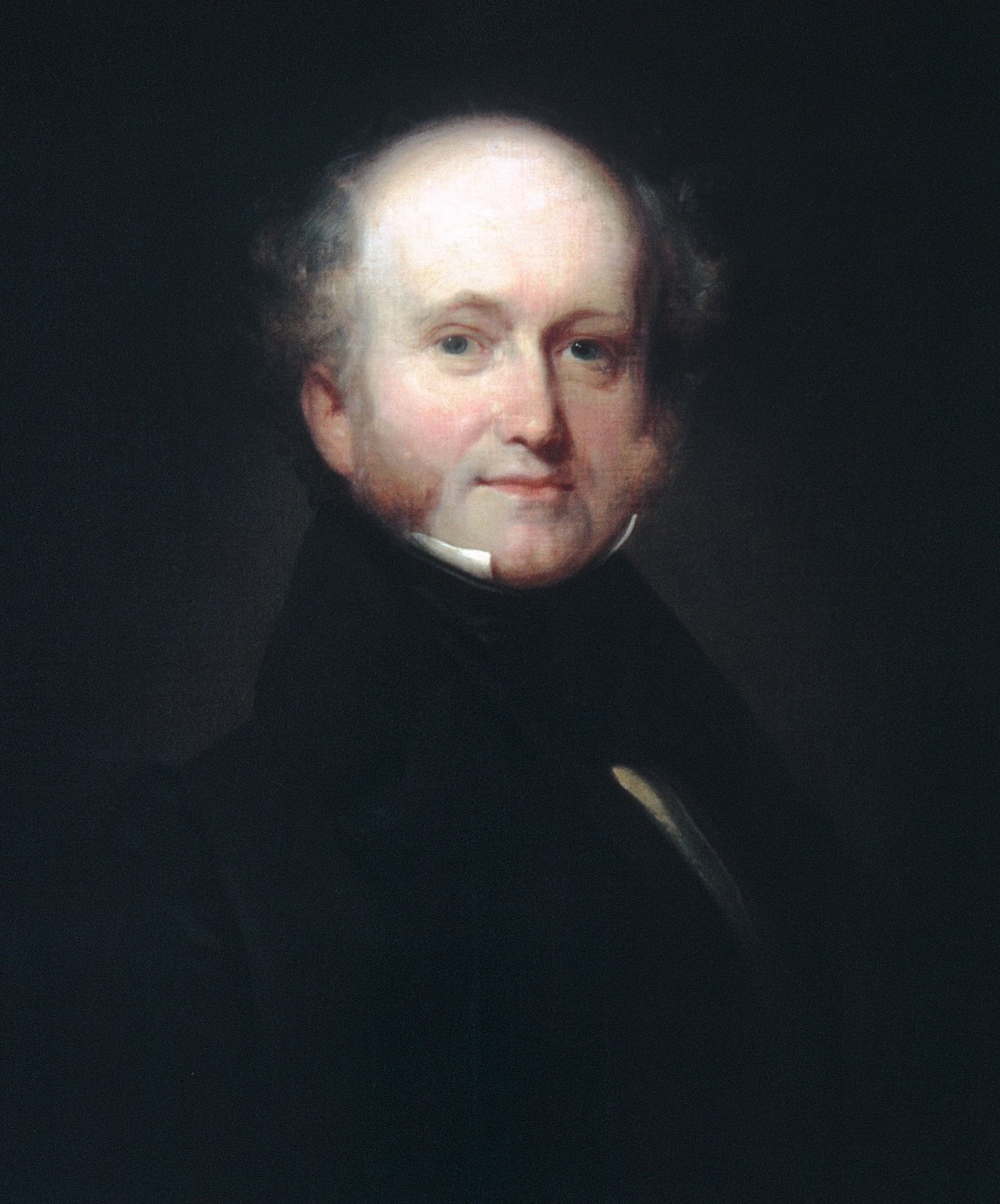

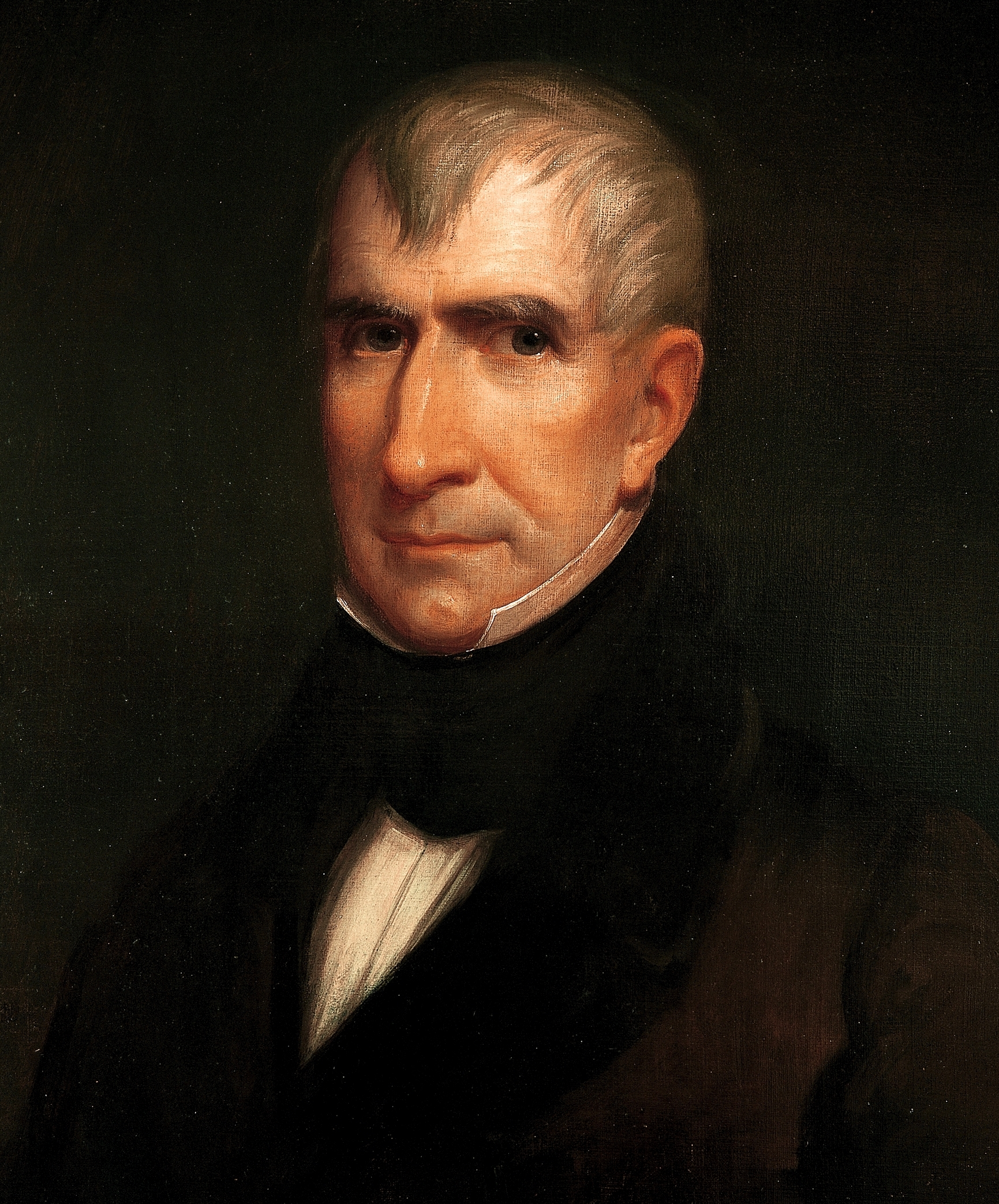
Nominee	Martin Van Buren	William Henry Harrison
Party	Democratic	Whig
Home state	New York	Ohio
Running mate	Richard Mentor Johnson	Francis Granger
Electoral vote	5	0
Popular vote	18,369	15,220
Percentage	54.69%	45.31%
County results
Van Buren
50–60%
60–70%
70–80%
80–90%
90–100%
Harrison
50–60%
60–70%
70–80%
No Data/Vote

A presidential election was held in Illinois on November 7, 1836, as part of the 1836 United States presidential election. Voters chose five representatives, or electors to the Electoral College, who voted for President and Vice President.

Illinois voted for the Democratic candidate, Martin Van Buren, over Whig candidate William Henry Harrison. Van Buren won Illinois by a margin of 9.38%.

Harrison won Chicago by six votes.

== Results ==
1836 United States presidential election in Illinois
Party	Candidate	Votes	Percentage	Electoral votes
Democratic	Martin Van Buren	18,369	54.69%	5
Whig	William Henry Harrison	15,220	45.31%	0
Totals		33,589	100.0%	5

== See also ==
- United States presidential elections in Illinois

== Works cited ==
- Merriner, James (2004). Grafters and Goo Goos: Corruption and Reform in Chicago, 1833-2003. Southern Illinois University Press. ISBN 0809325713.
