= 1848 United States presidential election in Illinois =

- November 7, 1848
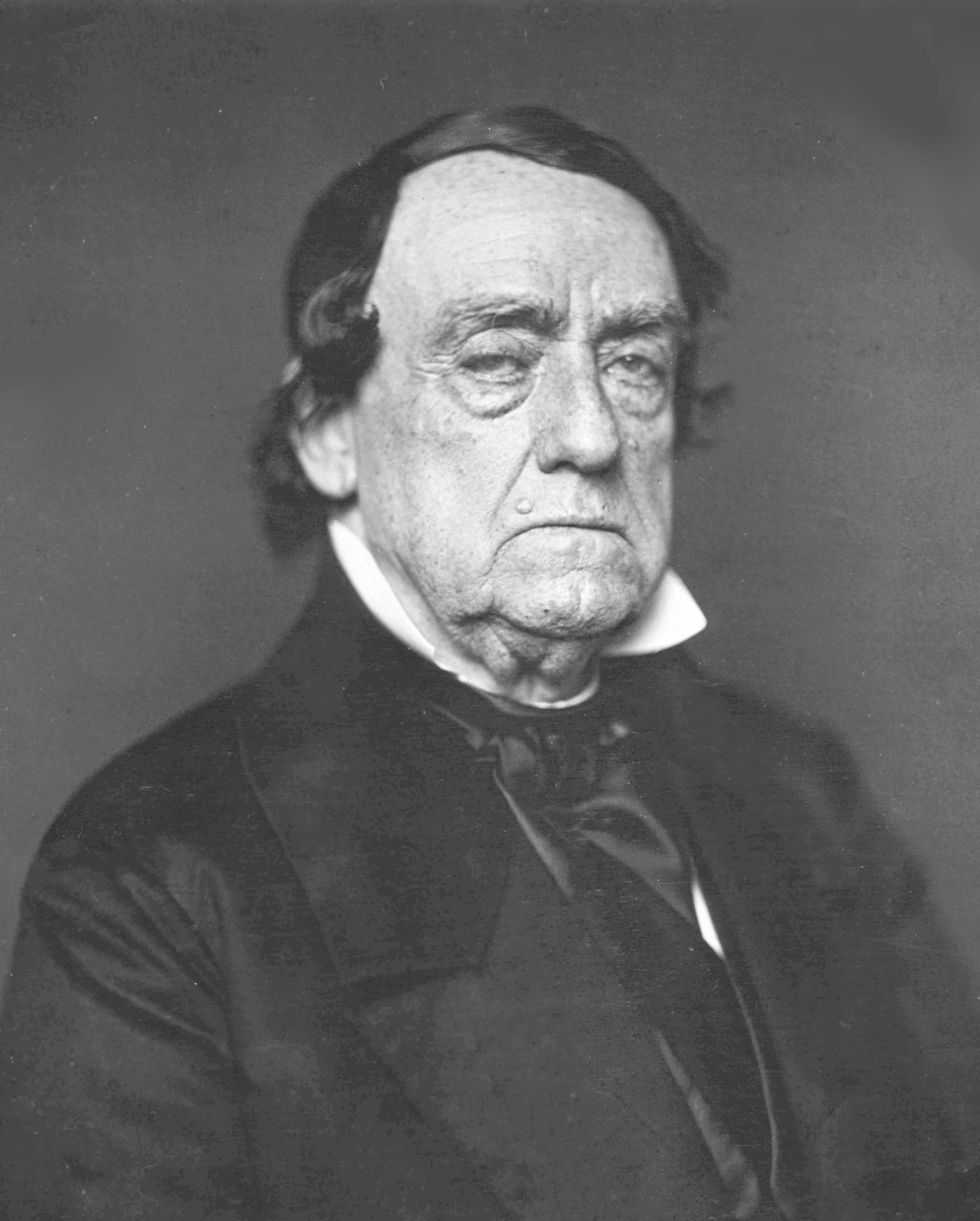

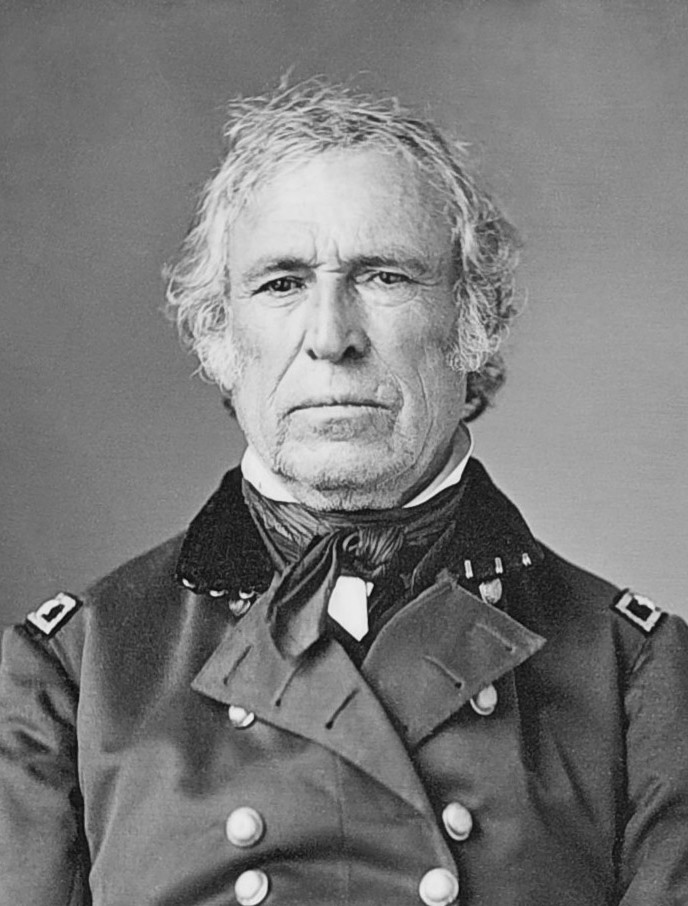

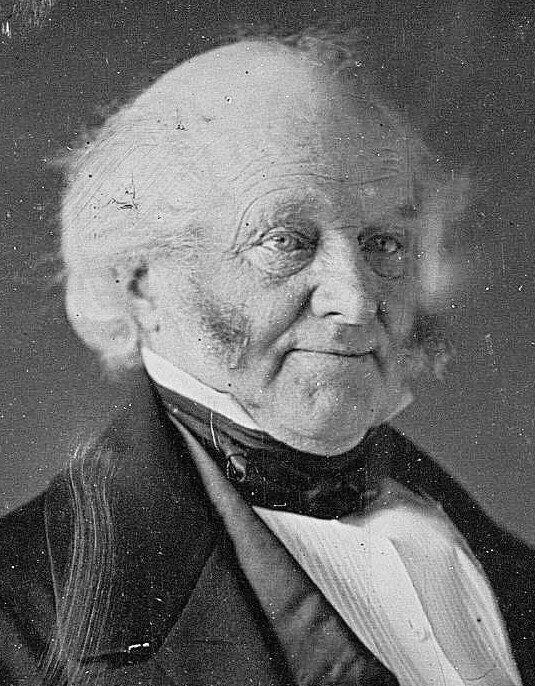
Nominee	Lewis Cass	Zachary Taylor	Martin Van Buren
Party	Democratic	Whig	Free Soil
Home state	Michigan	Louisiana	New York
Running mate	William O. Butler	Millard Fillmore	Charles Francis Adams Sr.
Electoral vote	9	0	0
Popular vote	55,952	52,853	15,702
Percentage	44.91%	42.42%	12.60%
County results
Cass
40–50%
50–60%
60–70%
70–80%
80–90%
Taylor
40–50%
50–60%
60–70%
Van Buren
40–50%
50–60%
President before election
James K. Polk
Democratic
Elected President
Zachary Taylor
Whig

The 1848 United States presidential election in Illinois took place on November 7, 1848, as part of the 1848 United States presidential election. Voters chose nine representatives, or electors to the Electoral College, who voted for President and Vice President.

Illinois narrowly voted for the Democratic candidate, Lewis Cass, over Whig candidate Zachary Taylor and Free Soil candidate Martin Van Buren. Cass won Illinois by a tight margin of 2.49%. This was the last time until 2000 that Illinois would back a losing Democrat in a presidential election and the last time until 2004 that they would back a Democrat that lost the popular vote.

== Results ==
1848 United States presidential election in Illinois
Party	Candidate	Running mate	Popular vote		Electoral vote	
Party	Candidate	Running mate	Count	%	Count	%
Democratic	Lewis Cass of Michigan	William O. Butler of Kentucky	55,952	44.91%	9	100.00%
Whig	Zachary Taylor of Louisiana	Millard Fillmore of New York	52,853	42.42%	0	0.00%
Free Soil	Martin Van Buren of New York	Charles Francis Adams Sr. of Massachusetts	15,702	12.60%	0	0.00%
Clay Whig	Henry Clay of Kentucky	–	89	0.07%	0	0.00%
Total			124,596	100.00%	9	100.00%

== See also ==
- United States presidential elections in Illinois
