= 1864 United States presidential election in Illinois =

- November 8, 1864
- Turnout: 20.34% of the total population ▲0.50 pp

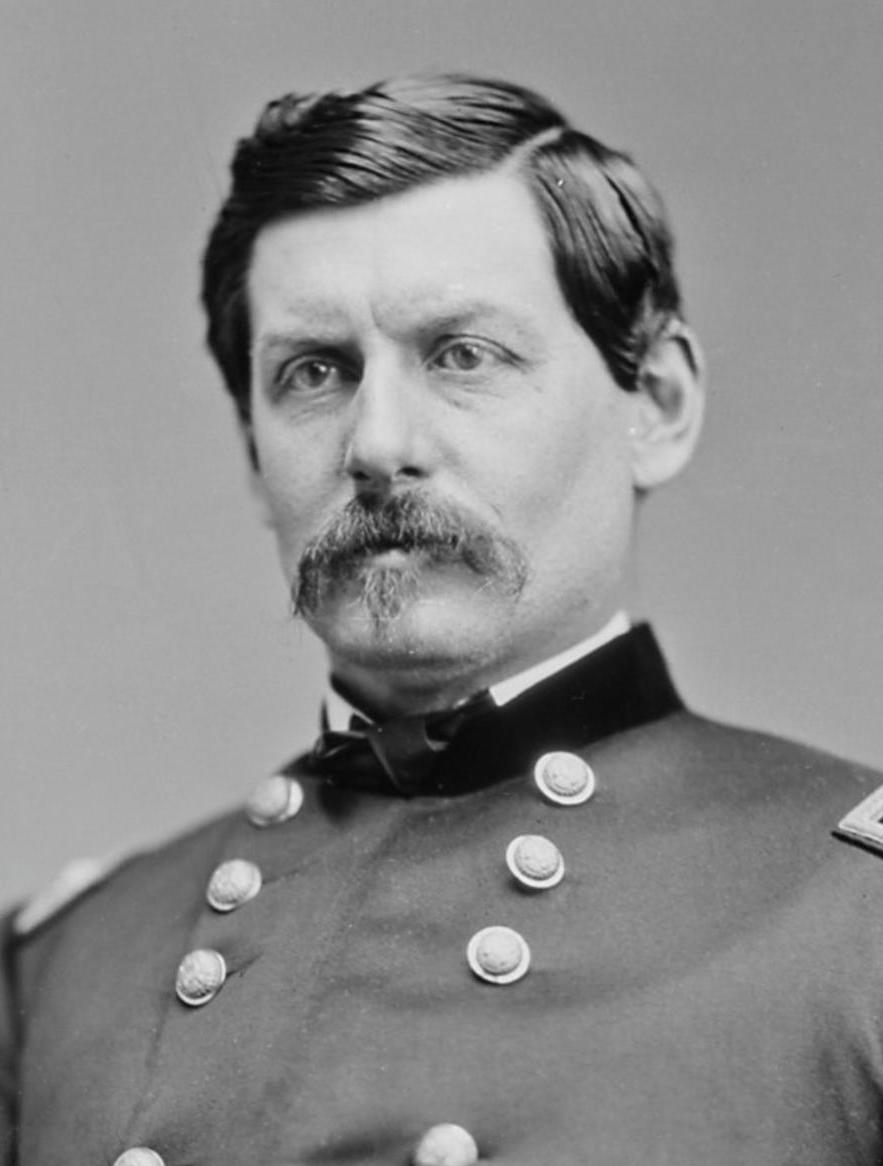
| Nominee | Abraham Lincoln | George B. McClellan |
| Party | National Union | Democratic |
| Home state | Illinois | New Jersey |
| Running mate | Andrew Johnson | George H. Pendleton |
| Electoral vote | 16 | 0 |
| Popular vote | 189,512 | 158,724 |
| Percentage | 54.42% | 45.58% |
County results
Lincoln
50–60%
60–70%
70–80%
80–90%
McClellan
50–60%
60–70%
70–80%
President before election
Abraham Lincoln
Republican
Elected President
Abraham Lincoln
National Union

The 1864 United States presidential election in Illinois took place on November 8, 1864, as part of the 1864 United States presidential election. State voters chose 16 representatives, or electors, to the Electoral College, who voted for president and vice president.

Illinois was won by the National Union candidate incumbent Republican President Abraham Lincoln of Illinois and his running mate former Senator and Military Governor of Tennessee Andrew Johnson. They defeated the Democratic candidate 4th Commanding General of the United States Army George B. McClellan of New Jersey and his running mate Representative George H. Pendleton of Ohio. Lincoln won his home state by a margin of 8.84%.

== Results ==
1864 United States presidential election in Illinois
| Party | Candidate | Running mate | Popular vote | | Electoral vote | |
| Party | Candidate | Running mate | Count | % | Count | % |
|---|---|---|---|---|---|---|
| National Union | Abraham Lincoln of Illinois | Andrew Johnson of Tennessee | 189,512 | 54.42% | 16 | 100.00% |
| Democratic | George B. McClellan of New Jersey | George H. Pendleton of Ohio | 158,724 | 45.58% | 0 | 0.00% |
| Total | | | 348,236 | 100.00% | 16 | 100.00% |

== See also ==
- United States presidential elections in Illinois
