= 1844 United States presidential election in Illinois =

- November 4, 1844

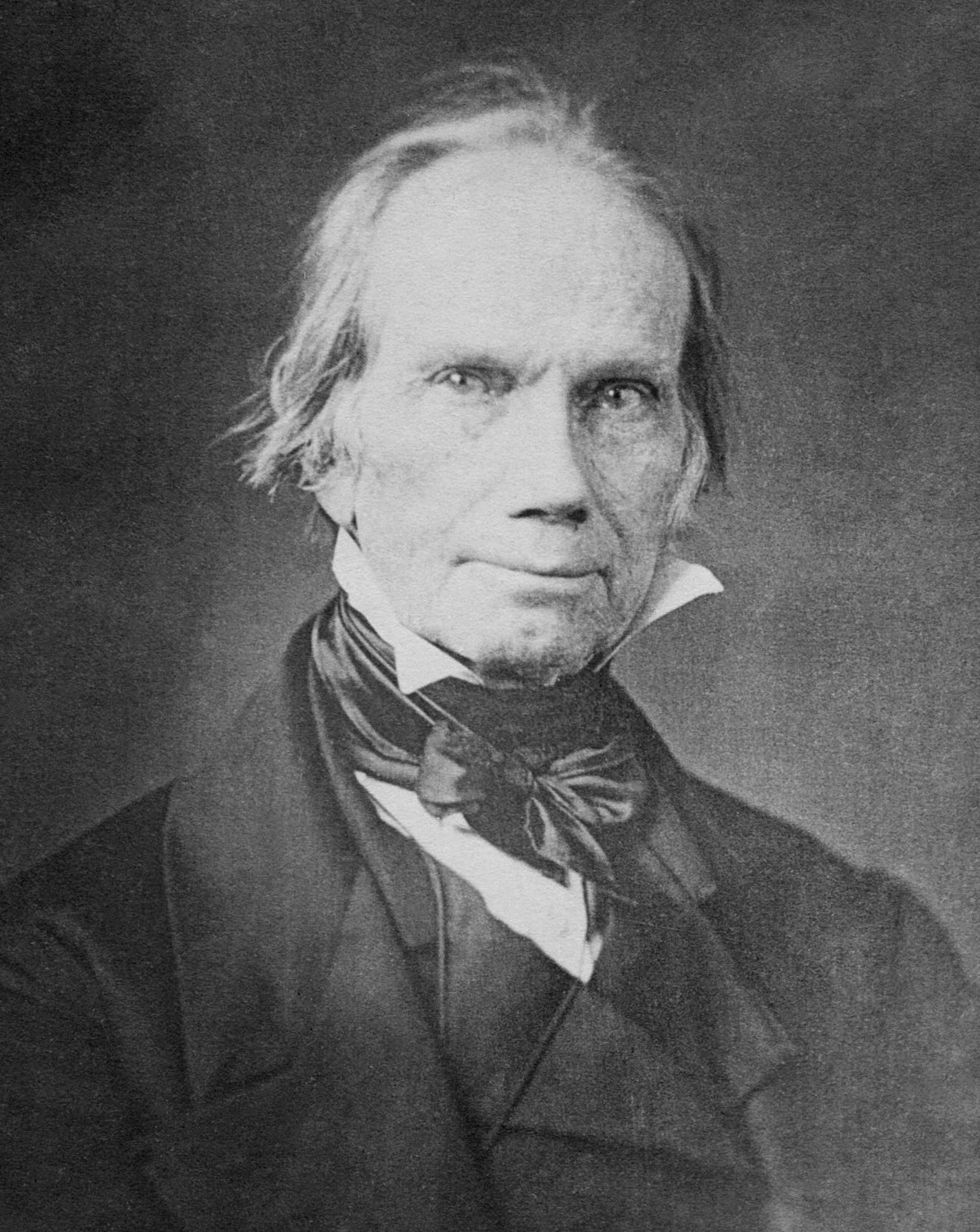
Nominee	James K. Polk	Henry Clay
Party	Democratic	Whig
Home state	Tennessee	Kentucky
Running mate	George M. Dallas	Theodore Frelinghuysen
Electoral vote	9	0
Popular vote	58,795	45,854
Percentage	53.91%	42.05%
County results
Polk
40–50%
50–60%
60–70%
70–80%
80–90%
90–100%
Clay
30–40%
40–50%
50–60%
60–70%
No Data/Vote
President before election
John Tyler
Independent
Elected President
James K. Polk
Democratic

A presidential election was held in Illinois on November 4, 1844, as part of the 1844 United States presidential election. Voters chose nine representatives, or electors to the Electoral College, who voted for President and Vice President.

Illinois voted for the Democratic candidate, James K. Polk, over Whig candidate Henry Clay. Polk won Illinois by a margin of 11.86%. Boone County would not vote Democratic again until 2008.

== Results ==
1844 United States presidential election in Illinois
Party	Candidate	Running mate	Popular vote		Electoral vote	
Party	Candidate	Running mate	Count	%	Count	%
Democratic	James K. Polk of Tennessee	George M. Dallas of Pennsylvania	58,795	53.91%	9	100.00%
Whig	Henry Clay of Kentucky	Theodore Frelinghuysen of New York	45,854	42.05%	0	0.00%
Liberty	James G. Birney of Michigan	Thomas Morris of Ohio	3,469	3.18%	0	0.00%
N/A	Others	Others	939	0.86%	0	0.00%
Total			109,057	100.00%	9	100.00%

== See also ==
- United States presidential elections in Illinois
