= 1852 United States presidential election in Illinois =

- November 2, 1852

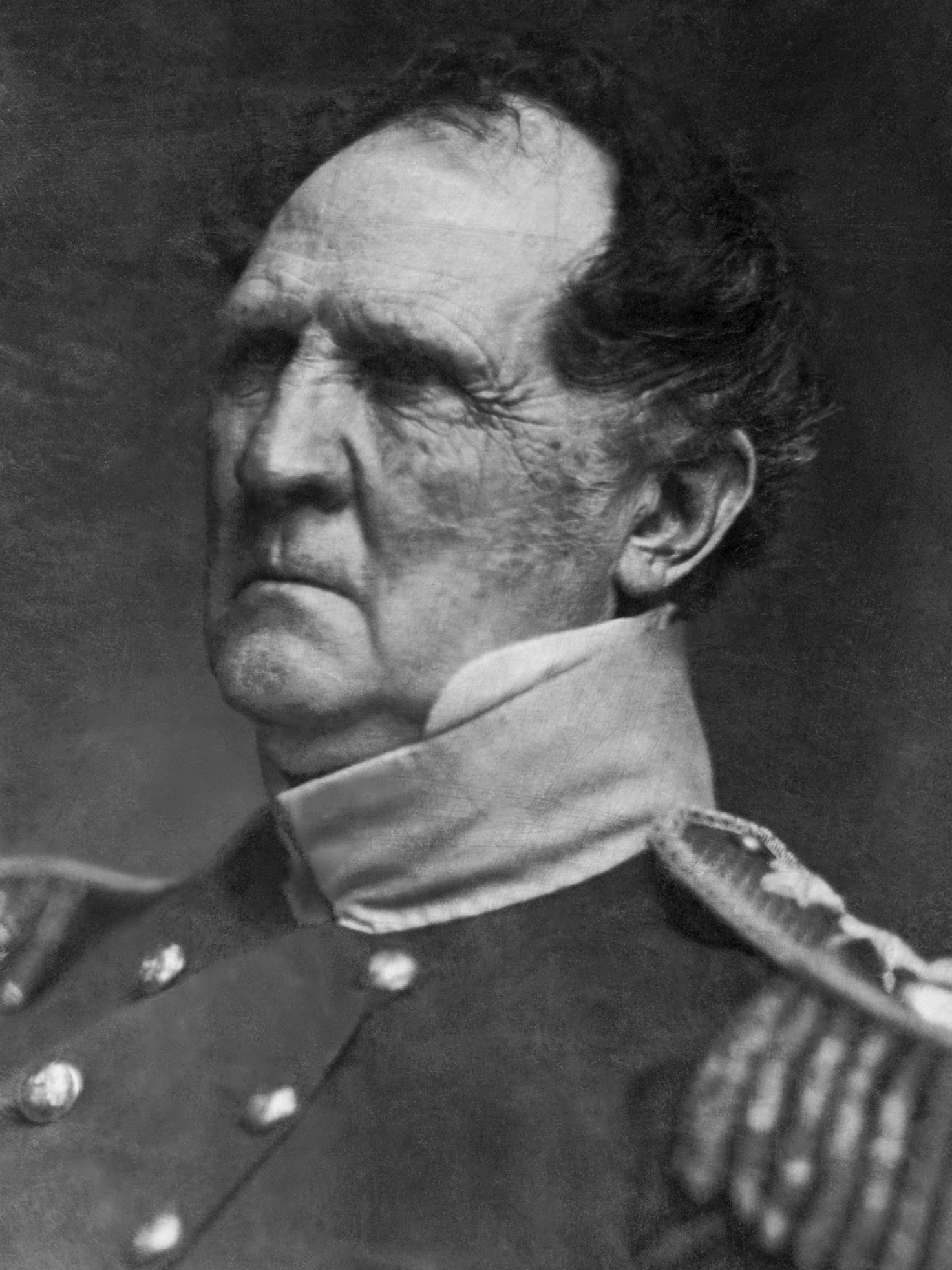

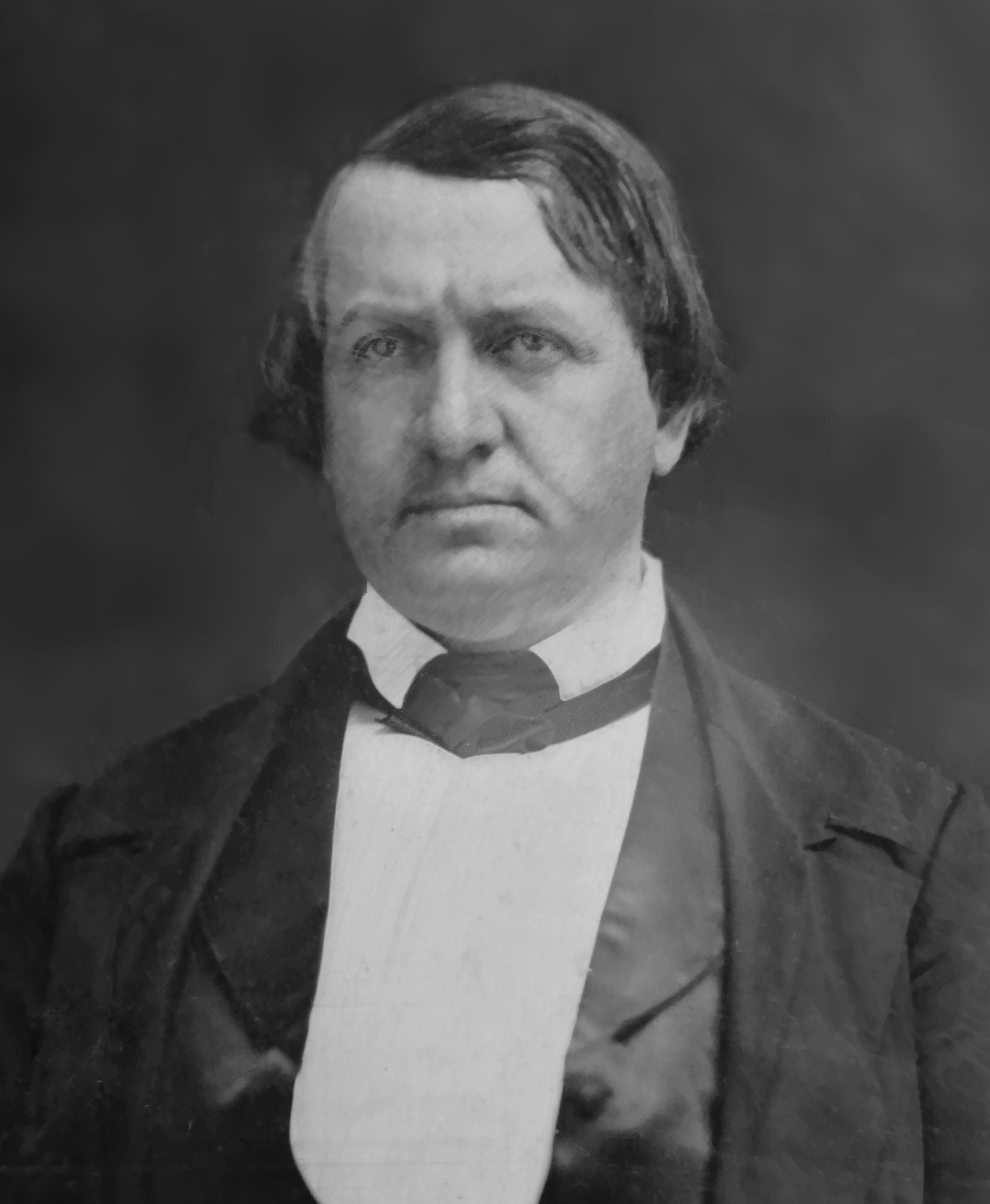
Nominee	Franklin Pierce	Winfield Scott	John P. Hale
Party	Democratic	Whig	Free Soil
Home state	New Hampshire	New Jersey	New Hampshire
Running mate	William R. King	William Alexander Graham	George W. Julian
Electoral vote	11	0	0
Popular vote	80,378	64,733	9,863
Percentage	51.87%	41.77%	6.36%
County results
Pierce
40–50%
50–60%
60–70%
70–80%
80–90%
Scott
30–40%
40–50%
50–60%
60–70%
President before election
Millard Fillmore
Whig
Elected President
Franklin Pierce
Democratic

The 1852 United States presidential election in Illinois took place on November 2, 1852, as part of the 1852 United States presidential election. Voters chose 11 representatives, or electors to the Electoral College, who voted for President and Vice President.

Illinois voted for the Democratic candidate, Franklin Pierce, over Whig candidate Winfield Scott and Free Soil candidate John P. Hale. Pierce won Illinois by a margin of 10.10%. This is the last time that Lee County voted for the Democratic candidate. DuPage, Kane, Kendall, and McHenry counties would not vote Democratic again until 2008. DeKalb County would not vote Democratic again until 1992.

== Results ==
1852 United States presidential election in Illinois
Party	Candidate	Running mate	Popular vote		Electoral vote	
Party	Candidate	Running mate	Count	%	Count	%
Democratic	Franklin Pierce of New Hampshire	William R. King of Alabama	80,378	51.87%	11	100.00%
Whig	Winfield Scott of New Jersey	William Alexander Graham of North Carolina	64,733	41.77%	0	0.00%
Free Soil	John P. Hale of New Hampshire	George W. Julian of Indiana	9,863	6.36%	0	0.00%
Total			154,974	100.00%	11	100.00%

== See also ==
- United States presidential elections in Illinois
