= 1840 United States presidential election in Illinois =

- November 2, 1840
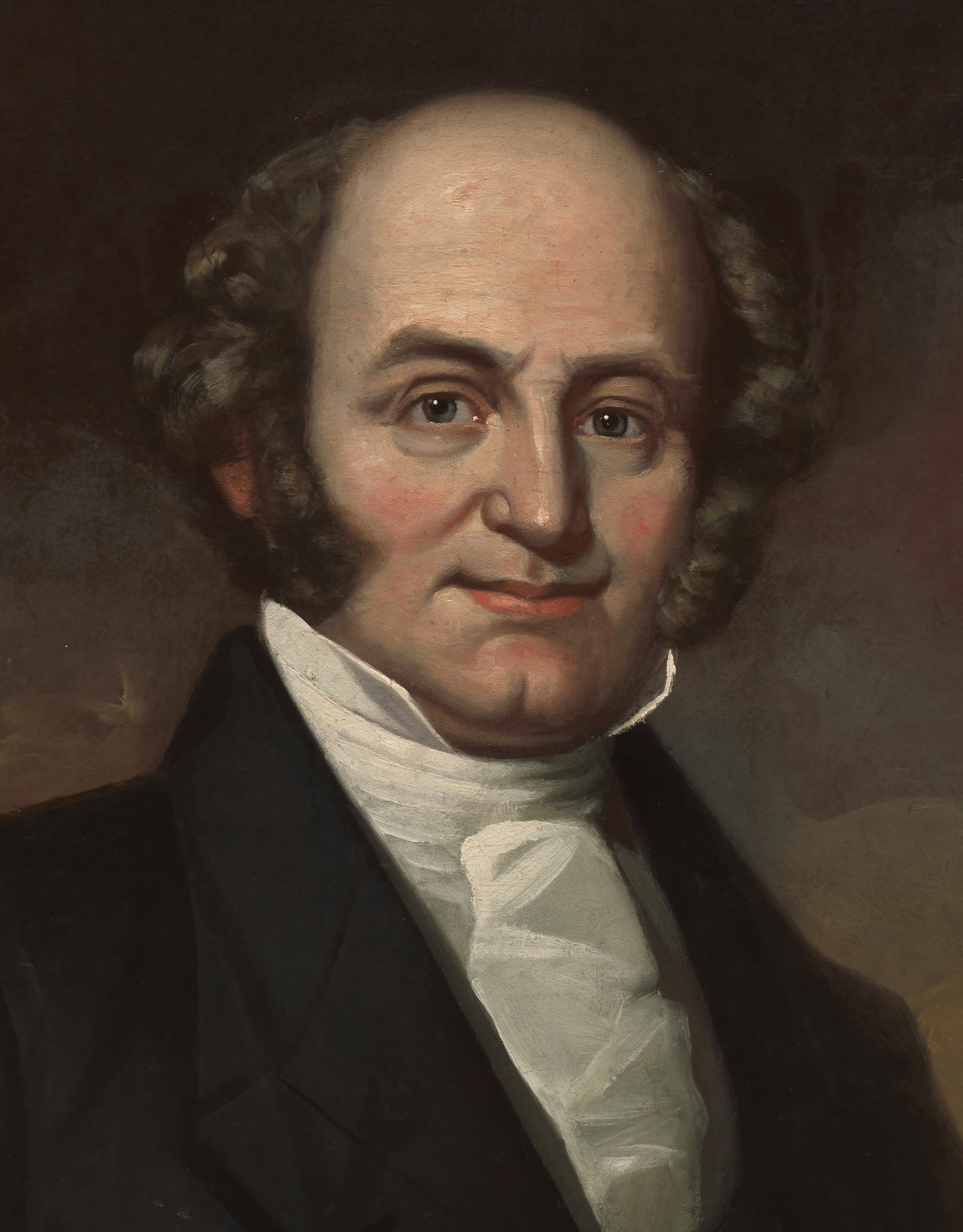

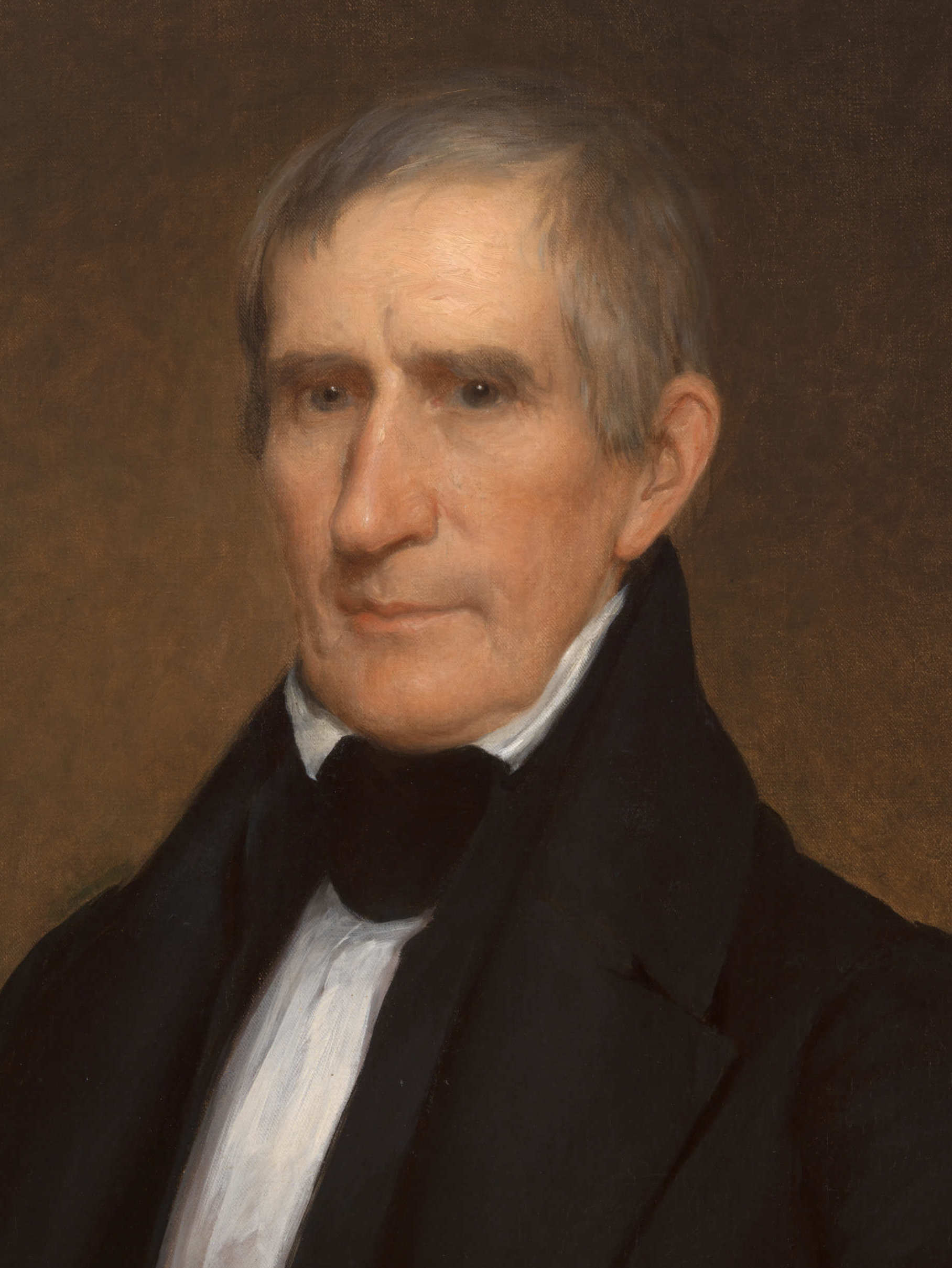
Nominee	Martin Van Buren	William Henry Harrison
Party	Democratic	Whig
Home state	New York	Ohio
Running mate	Richard Mentor Johnson	John Tyler
Electoral vote	5	0
Popular vote	47,441	45,574
Percentage	50.92%	48.91%
County results
Van Buren
50–60%
60–70%
70–80%
80–90%
Harrison
50–60%
60–70%
70–80%
President before election
Martin Van Buren
Democratic
Elected President
William Henry Harrison
Whig

A presidential election was held in Illinois on November 2, 1840, as part of the 1840 United States presidential election. Voters chose five representatives, or electors to the Electoral College, who voted for President and Vice President.

Illinois voted for the Democratic candidate, Martin Van Buren, over Whig candidate William Henry Harrison. Van Buren won Illinois by a margin of 2.01%.

== Results ==
1840 United States presidential election in Illinois
Party	Candidate	Running mate	Popular vote		Electoral vote	
Party	Candidate	Running mate	Count	%	Count	%
Democratic	Martin Van Buren of New York	Richard Mentor Johnson of Kentucky	47,441	50.92%	5	100.00%
Whig	William Henry Harrison of Ohio	John Tyler of Virginia	45,574	48.91%	0	0.00%
Liberty	James G. Birney of New York	Thomas Earle of Pennsylvania	160	0.17%	0	0.00%
Total			93,175	100.00%	5	100.00%

== See also ==
- United States presidential elections in Illinois
