= 1832 United States presidential election in Illinois =

- November 2 – December 5, 1832
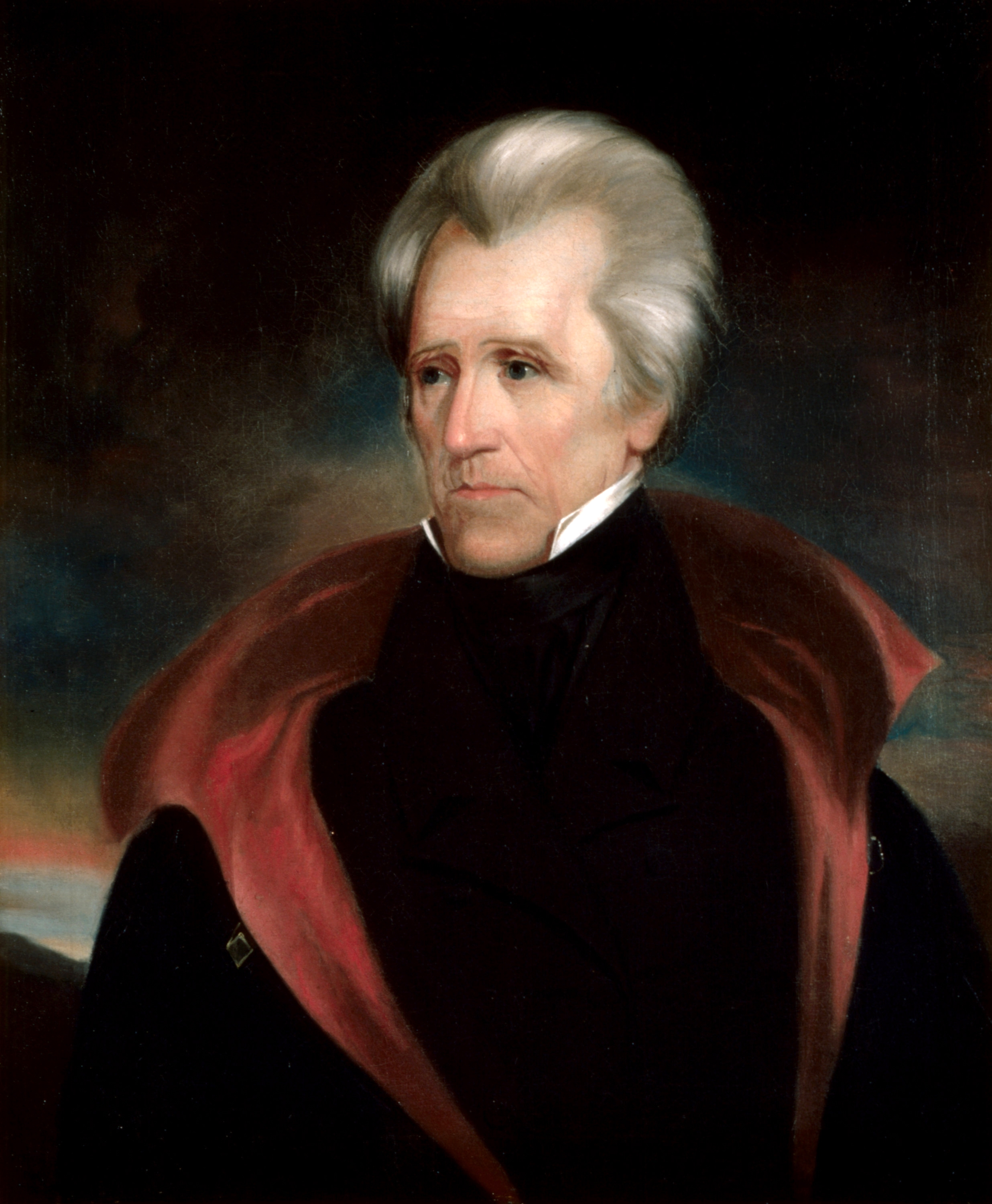

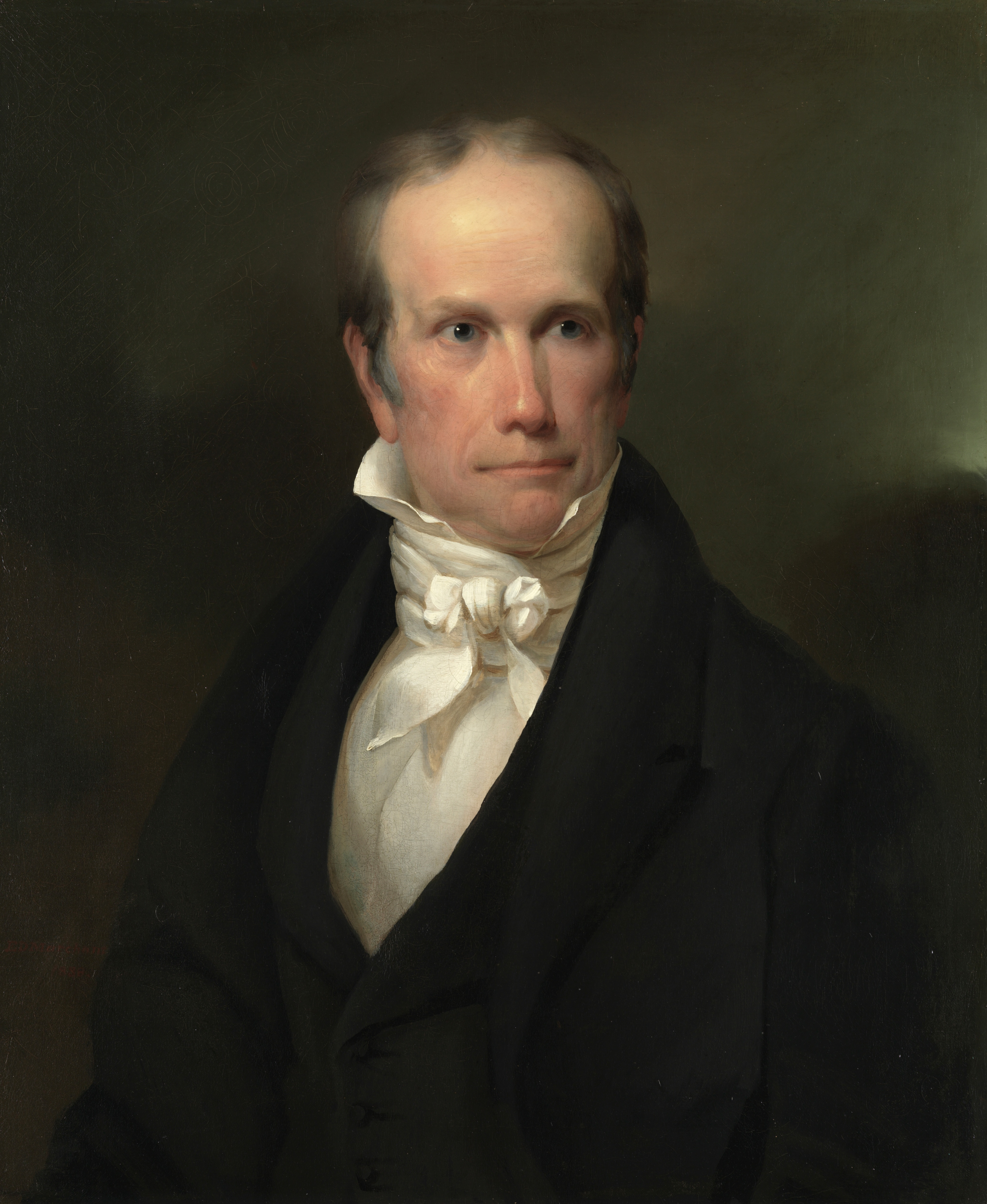
Nominee	Andrew Jackson	Henry Clay
Party	Democratic	National Republican
Home state	Tennessee	Kentucky
Running mate	Martin Van Buren	John Sergeant
Electoral vote	5	0
Popular vote	14,609	6,745
Percentage	68.01%	31.40%
County results
Jackson
50–60%
60–70%
70–80%
80–90%
90–100%
Clay
50–60%
60–70%
No Data/Vote

The 1832 United States presidential election in Illinois took place between November 2 and December 5, 1832, as part of the 1832 United States presidential election. Voters chose five representatives, or electors to the Electoral College, who voted for President and Vice President.

Illinois voted for the Democratic Party candidate, Andrew Jackson, over the National Republican candidate, Henry Clay, and the Anti-Masonic Party candidate, William Wirt. Jackson won Illinois by a margin of 36.61%. This is the most recent election in which Edwards County voted for the Democratic candidate.

As of 2024, this remains the strongest performance by a Democrat in Illinois. This is the last election in which a Democrat won Illinois with more than 60% of the vote until Barack Obama in 2008.

== Results ==
1832 United States presidential election in Illinois
Party	Candidate	Votes	Percentage	Electoral votes
Democratic	Andrew Jackson (incumbent)	14,609	68.01%	5
National Republican	Henry Clay	6,745	31.40%	0
Anti-Masonic	William Wirt	97	0.45%	0
N/A	Others	30	0.14%	0
Totals		21,481	100.0%	5

== See also ==
- United States presidential elections in Illinois
