= 1888 United States presidential election in Illinois =

- November 6, 1888
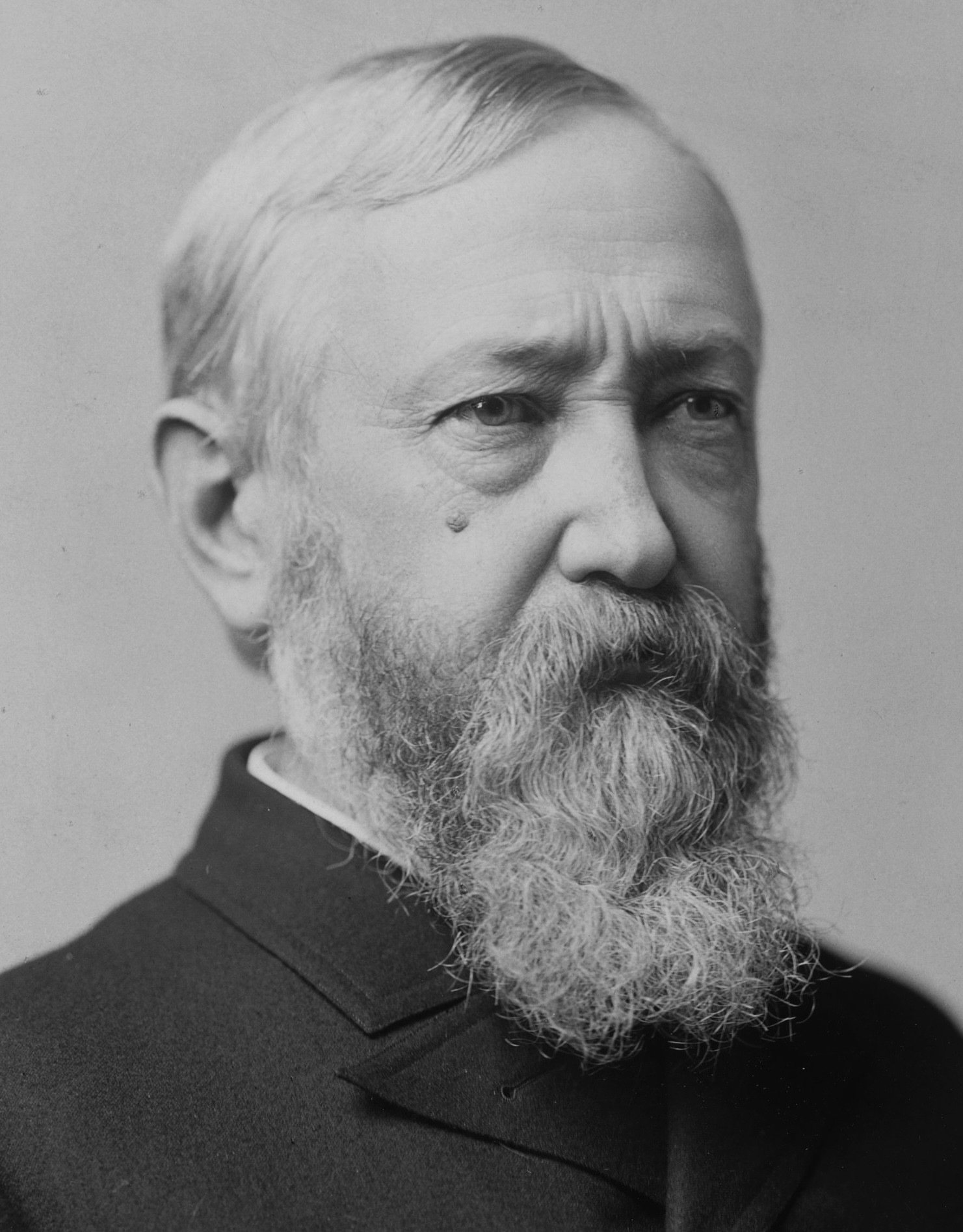

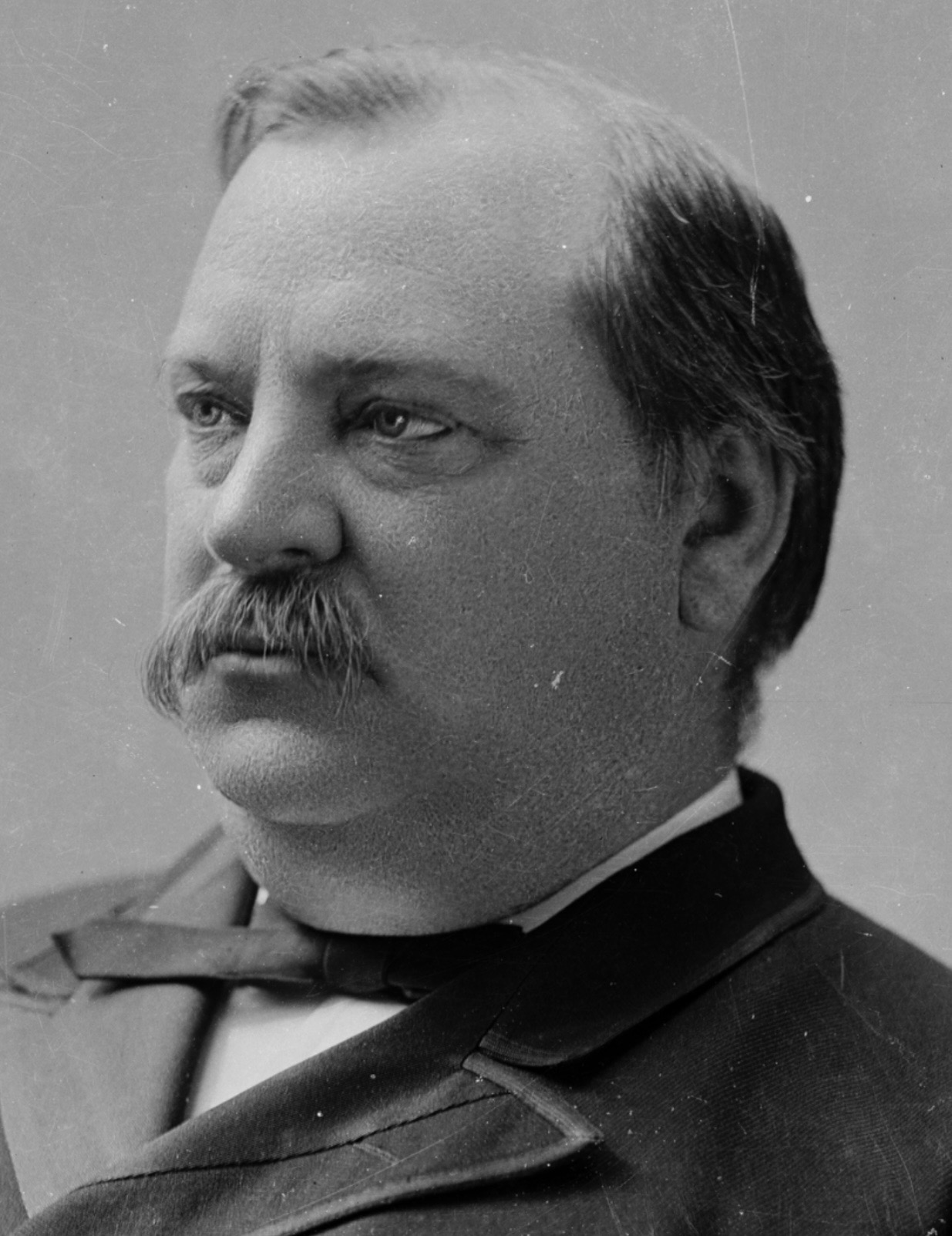
Nominee	Benjamin Harrison	Grover Cleveland
Party	Republican	Democratic
Home state	Indiana	New York
Running mate	Levi P. Morton	Allen G. Thurman
Electoral vote	22	0
Popular vote	370,475	348,351
Percentage	49.54%	46.58%
County results
Harrison
40–50%
50–60%
60–70%
70–80%
Cleveland
40–50%
50–60%
60–70%
President before election
Grover Cleveland
Democratic
Elected President
Benjamin Harrison
Republican

The 1888 United States presidential election in Illinois took place on November 6, 1888, as part of the 1888 United States presidential election. Voters chose 22 representatives, or electors to the Electoral College, who voted for president and vice president.

Illinois voted for the Republican nominee, Benjamin Harrison, over the Democratic nominee, incumbent President Grover Cleveland. Harrison won the state by a narrow margin of 2.96%.

== Results ==
1888 United States presidential election in Illinois
Party	Candidate	Running mate	Popular vote		Electoral vote	
Party	Candidate	Running mate	Count	%	Count	%
Republican	Benjamin Harrison of Indiana	Levi Parsons Morton of New York	370,475	49.54%	22	100.00%
Democratic	Grover Cleveland of New York (incumbent)	Allen Granberry Thurman of Ohio	348,351	46.58%	0	0.00%
Prohibition	Clinton Bowen Fisk of New Jersey	John Anderson Brooks of Missouri	21,703	2.90%	0	0.00%
Union Labor	Alson Jenness Streeter of Illinois	Charles E. Cunningham of Arkansas	7,134	0.95%	0	0.00%
United Labor Party	Robert Cowdrey	W.H.T. Wakefield	150	0.02%	0	0.00%
Total			747,813	100.00%	22	100.00%

=== Chicago results ===
1888 United States presidential election in Chicago
Party	Candidate	Votes	Percentage
Democratic	Grover Cleveland	63,561	50.73%
Republican	Benjamin Harrison	59,914	47.82%
Prohibition	Clinton B. Fisk	1,246	0.99%
Union Labor	Alson Streeter	563	0.45%
Totals		125,284	100.00%

== See also ==
- United States presidential elections in Illinois
