= 1884 United States presidential election in Illinois =

- November 4, 1884
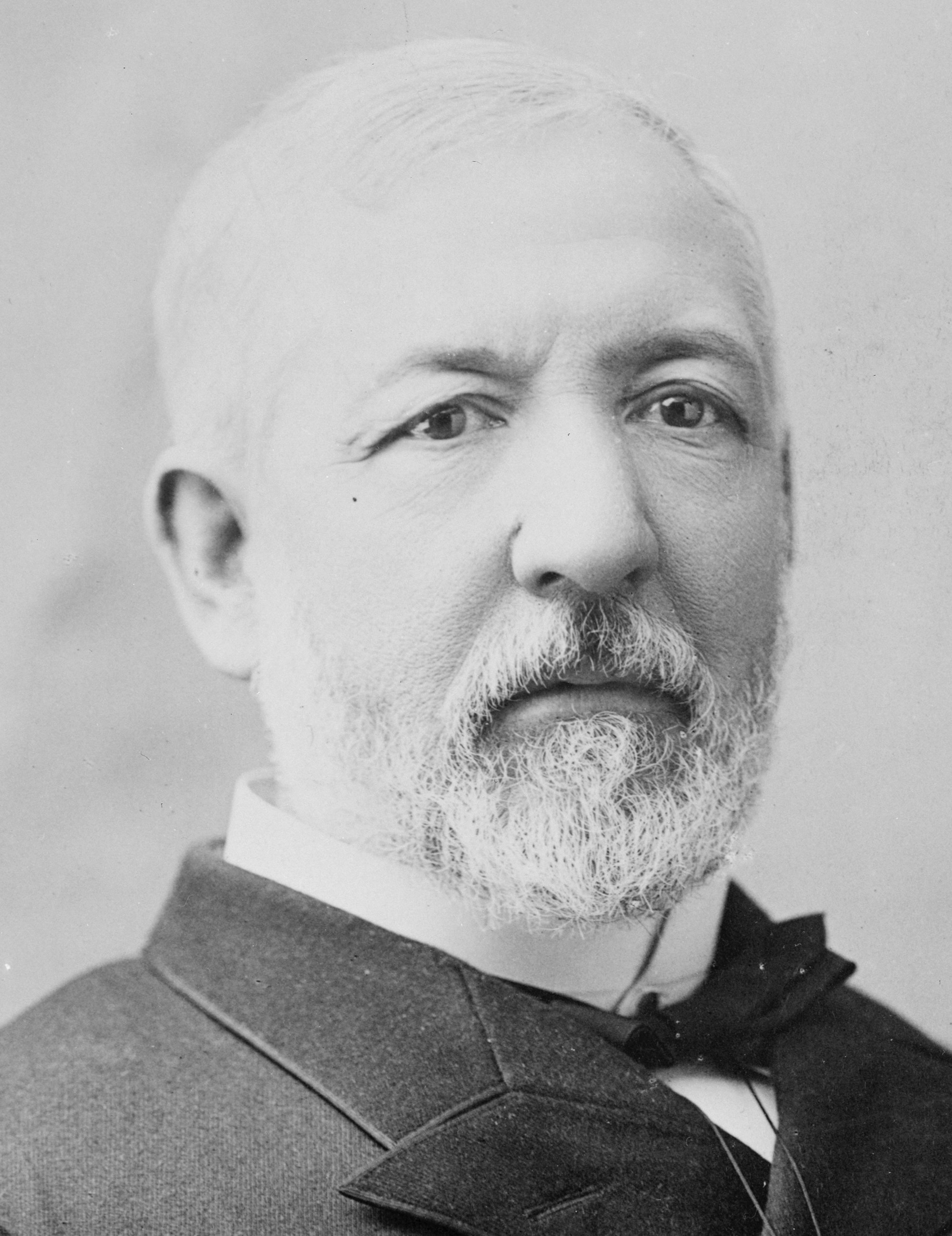

Nominee	James G. Blaine	Grover Cleveland
Party	Republican	Democratic
Home state	Maine	New York
Running mate	John A. Logan	Thomas A. Hendricks
Electoral vote	22	0
Popular vote	337,469	312,351
Percentage	50.17%	46.43%
County results
Blaine
40–50%
50–60%
60–70%
70–80%
Cleveland
40–50%
50–60%
60–70%
Tie
<50%
President before election
Chester A. Arthur
Republican
Elected President
Grover Cleveland
Democratic

The 1884 United States presidential election in Illinois took place on November 4, 1884, as part of the 1884 United States presidential election. Voters chose 22 representatives, or electors to the Electoral College, who voted for president and vice president.

Illinois voted for the Republican nominee, James G. Blaine, over the Democratic nominee, Grover Cleveland. Blaine won the state by a narrow margin of 3.74%.

This is the first of only three elections in the history of the party that a Democrat won the presidency without winning Illinois (the others being 1916 and 1976).

== Results ==
1884 United States presidential election in Illinois
Party	Candidate	Running mate	Popular vote		Electoral vote	
Party	Candidate	Running mate	Count	%	Count	%
Republican	James Gillespie Blaine of Maine	John Alexander Logan of Illinois	337,469	50.17%	22	100.00%
Democratic	Grover Cleveland of New York	Thomas Andrews Hendricks of Indiana	312,351	46.43%	0	0.00%
Prohibition	John Pierce St. John of Kansas	William Daniel of Maryland	12,074	1.79%	0	0.00%
Greenback	Benjamin Franklin Butler of Massachusetts	Absolom Madden West of Mississippi	10,776	1.60%	0	0.00%
Total			672,670	100.00%	22	100.00%

== See also ==
- United States presidential elections in Illinois
