= Government of Illinois =

Government of a U.S. state

- Great Seal of the State of Illinois
- Part of: United States
- Constitution: Constitution of Illinois

Legislative branch
- Name: Legislature
- Type: Bicameral
- Meeting place: Illinois General Assembly
- Upper house
- Name: Senate
- Presiding officer: Don Harmon, President
- Lower house
- Name: House of Representatives
- Presiding officer: Emanuel Chris Welch, Speaker

Executive branch
- Head of state and government
- Title: Governor
- Currently: J. B. Pritzker
- Appointer: Election
- Cabinet
- Name: Cabinet
- Leader: Governor
- Deputy leader: Lieutenant Governor
- Headquarters: Illinois State Capitol

Judicial branch
- Name: Judiciary of Illinois
- Courts: Courts of Illinois
- Supreme Court of Illinois
- Chief judge: P. Scott Neville Jr.
- Seat: Springfield, Illinois

The Government of Illinois, under the State of Illinois Constitution, has three branches of government: Executive, Legislative, and Judicial. The State's executive branch is split into several statewide elected offices, with the Governor as chief executive and head of state, and has numerous departments, agencies, boards and commissions. Legislative functions are granted to the General Assembly, a bicameral body consisting of the 118-member House of Representatives and the 59-member Senate. The judiciary is composed of the Supreme Court of Illinois and lower courts.

== Executive ==
The executive branch is composed of six elected officers and their offices, as well as numerous other departments. Illinois is one of 26 states that elect their governor on the same ticket as their lieutenant governor. The six elected officers are:

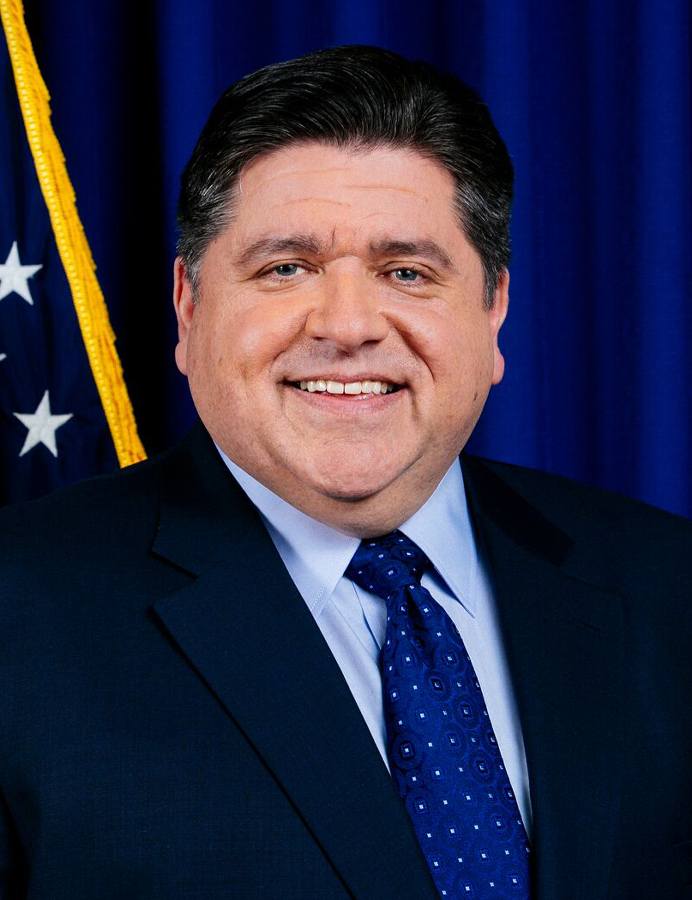
J. B. Pritzker (D)
Governor

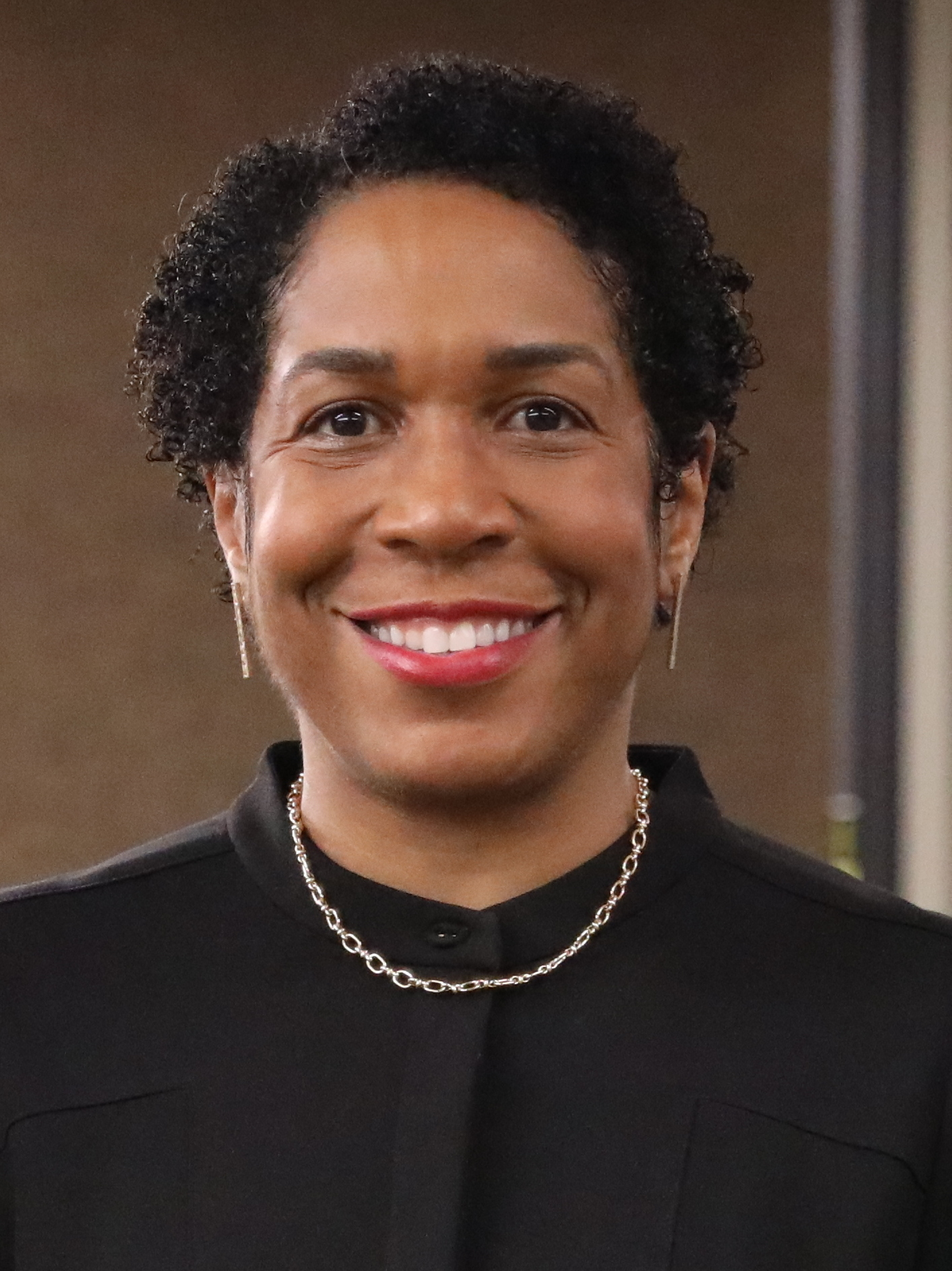
Juliana Stratton (D)
Lieutenant Governor

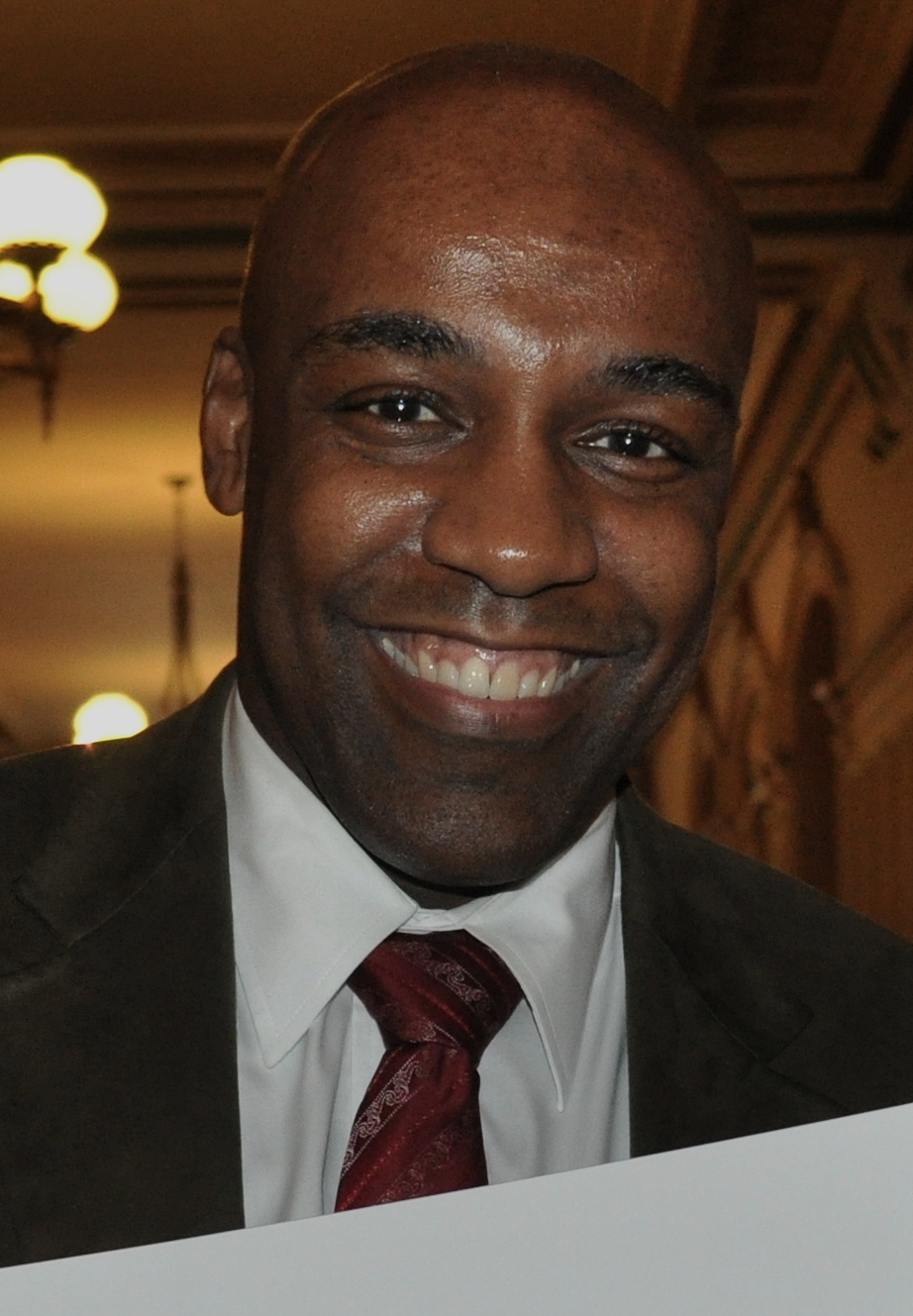
Kwame Raoul (D)
Attorney General

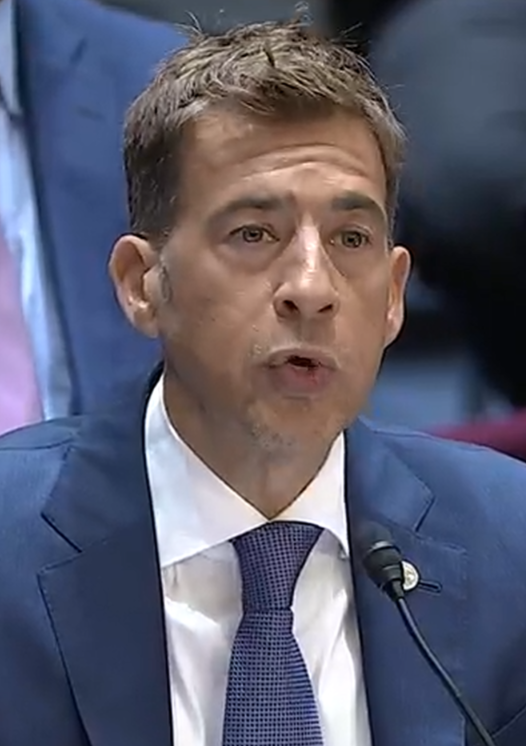
Alexi Giannoulias (D)
Secretary of State

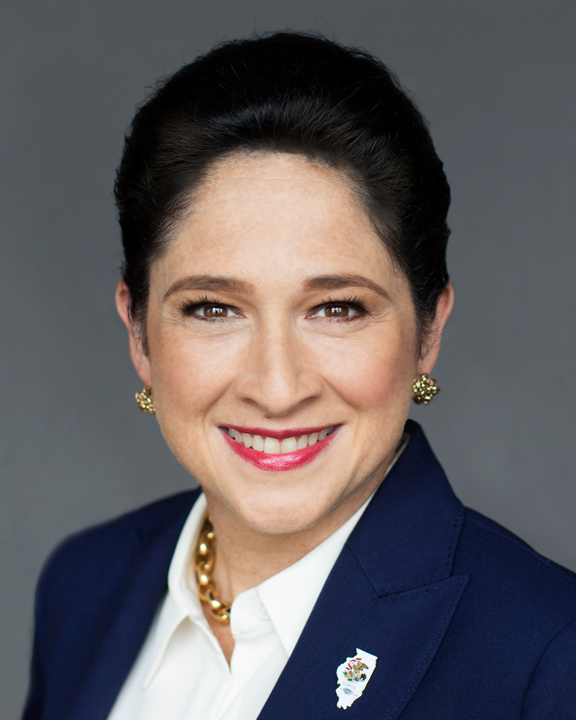
Susana Mendoza (D)
Comptroller

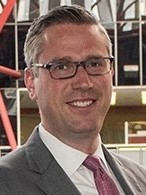
Mike Frerichs (D)
Treasurer

=== Departments ===
The government of Illinois has numerous departments, agencies, boards and commissions; however, the code departments, so called because they are established by the Civil Administrative Code of Illinois, provide most of the state's services:

- Department on Aging
- Department of Agriculture
- Department of Central Management Services
- Department of Children and Family Services
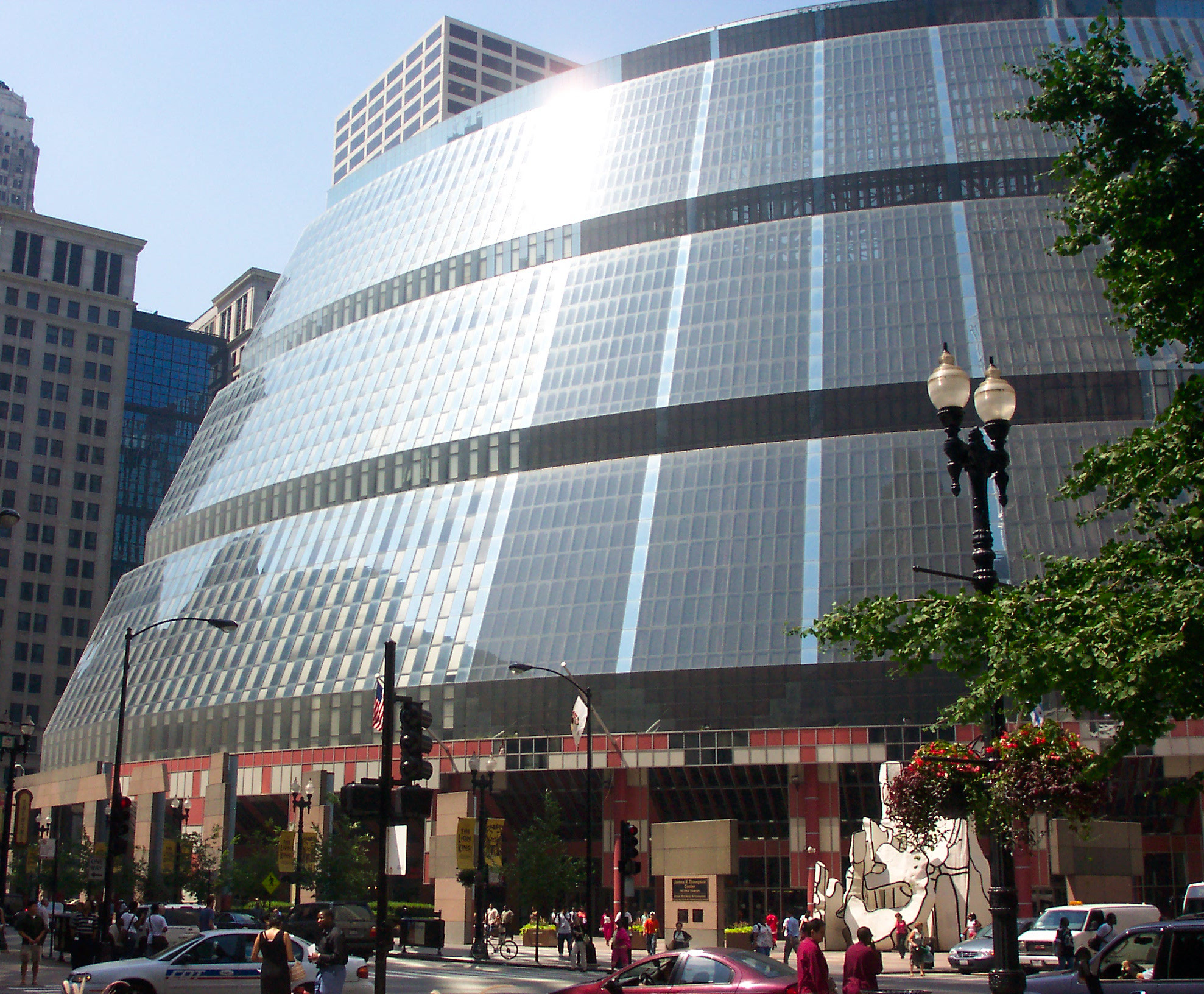
  The James R. Thompson Center in the Loop
- Department of Commerce and Economic Opportunity
- Department of Corrections
- Emergency Management Agency
- Department of Employment Security
- Department of Financial and Professional Regulation
- Department of Healthcare and Family Services
- Department of Human Rights
- Department of Human Services
- Department of Juvenile Justice
- Department of Labor
- Department of the Lottery
- Department of Natural Resources
- Department of Public Health
- Department of Revenue
- Department of State Police
- Department of Transportation
- Department of Veterans' Affairs

Regulations are codified in the Illinois Administrative Code. The Illinois Register is the weekly publication containing proposed and adopted rules.

== Legislature ==
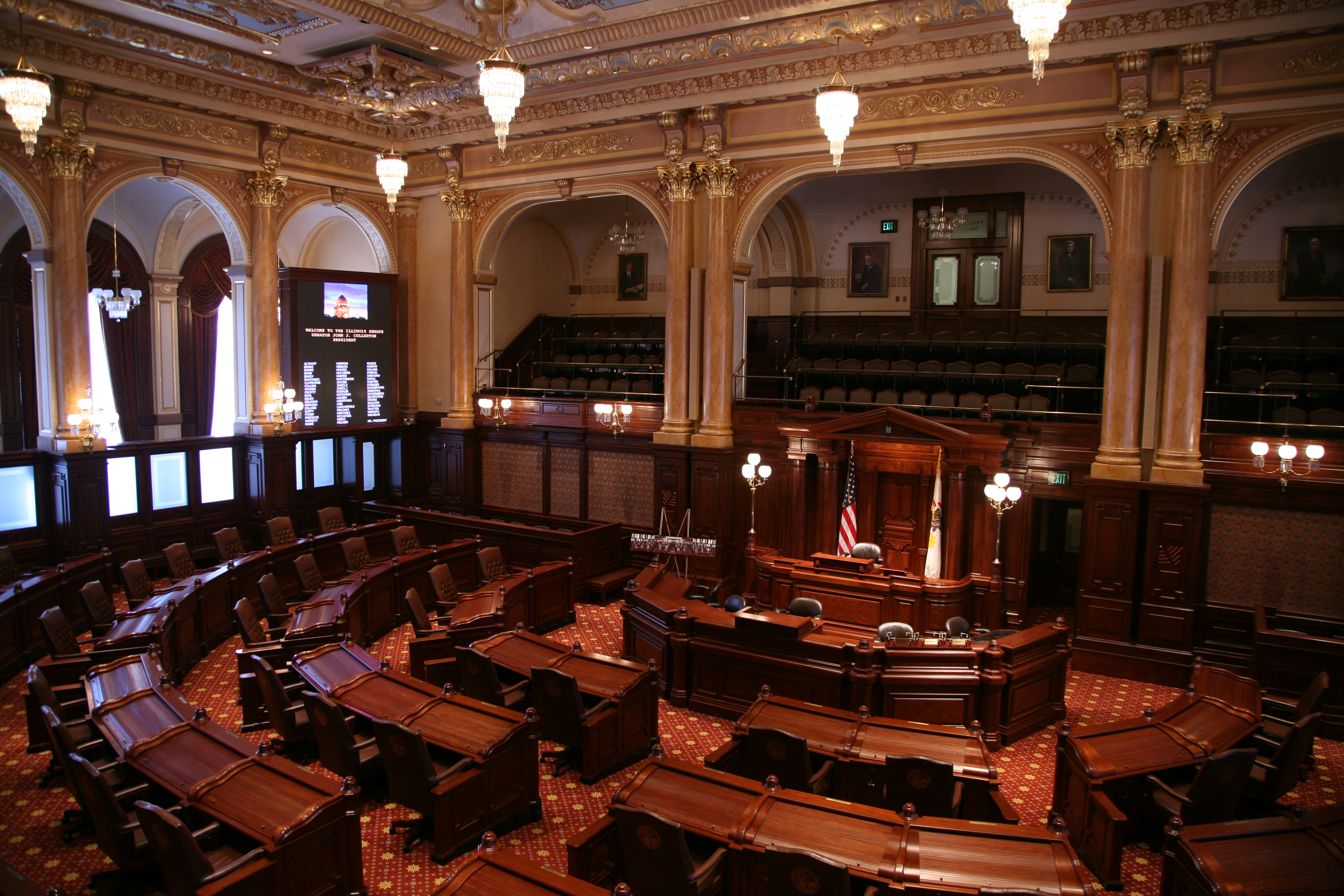
The State Senate Chamber of the Illinois State Capitol in Springfield

The Illinois General Assembly is the state legislature, composed of the 118-member Illinois House of Representatives and the 59-member Illinois Senate. Representatives elect from their chamber a Speaker and Speaker pro tempore, and senators elect from the chamber a President of the Senate.

The Governor has different types of vetoes, such as a full veto, reduction veto, and an amendatory veto, but the General Assembly has the power to override gubernatorial vetoes through a three-fifths majority vote of each chamber. The General Assembly's session laws are published in the official Laws of Illinois. The Illinois Compiled Statutes (ILCS) are the codified statutes of a general and permanent nature.

== Judiciary ==
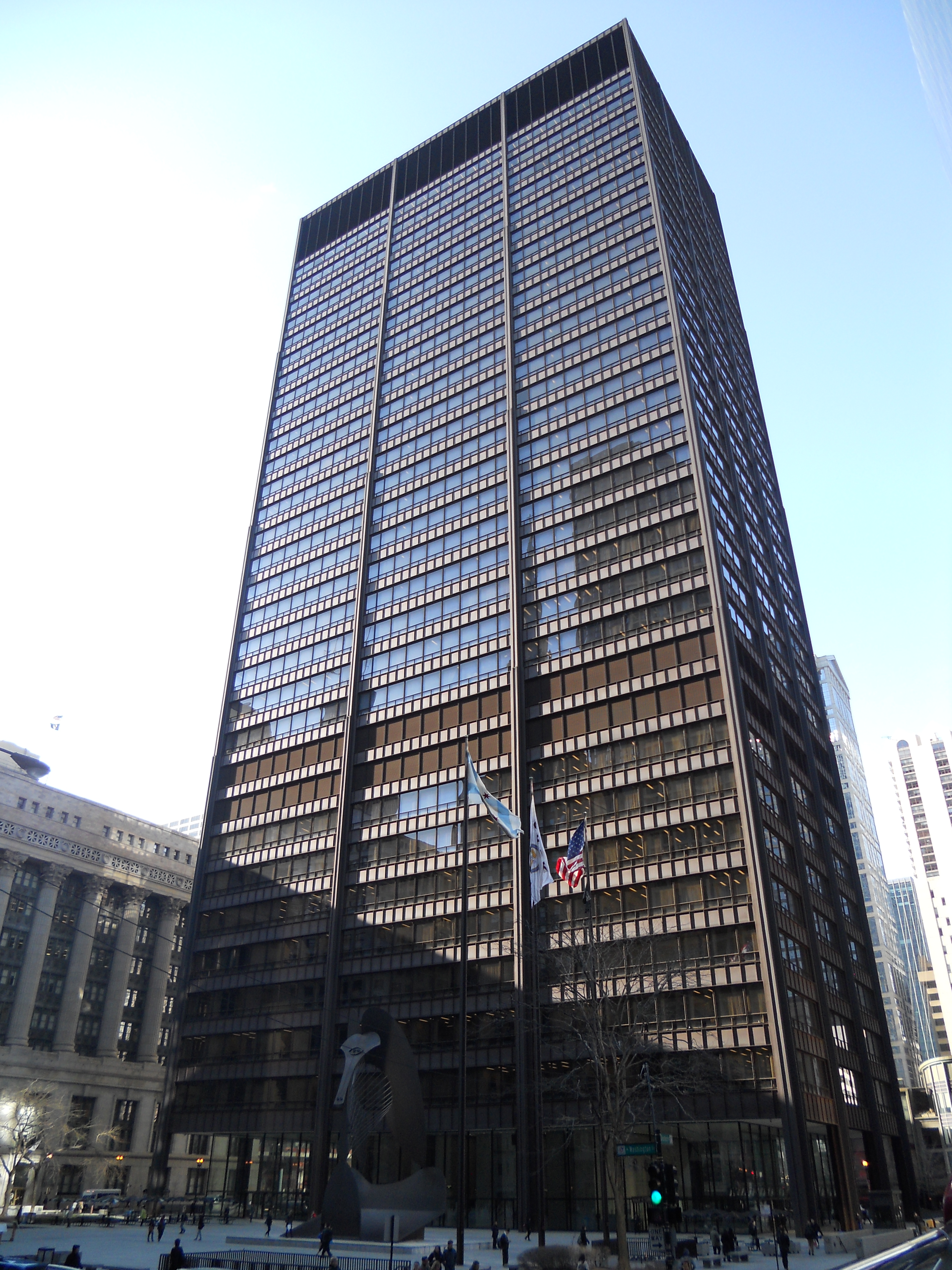
The Daley Center in Chicago houses offices and courtrooms for the Cook County Circuit Court

The Supreme Court has limited original jurisdiction and has final appellate jurisdiction. It has mandatory jurisdiction in capital cases and cases where the constitutionality of laws has been called into question, and has discretionary jurisdiction from the Appellate Court. The Appellate Court is the court of first appeal for civil and criminal cases rising in the Illinois circuit courts.

The circuit courts are trial courts of original jurisdiction. There are 25 judicial circuits in the state (24 numbered circuits and one for Cook County), each comprising one or more of Illinois' 102 counties. The circuit court has general jurisdiction and can decide, with few exceptions, any kind of case.

== Capital ==
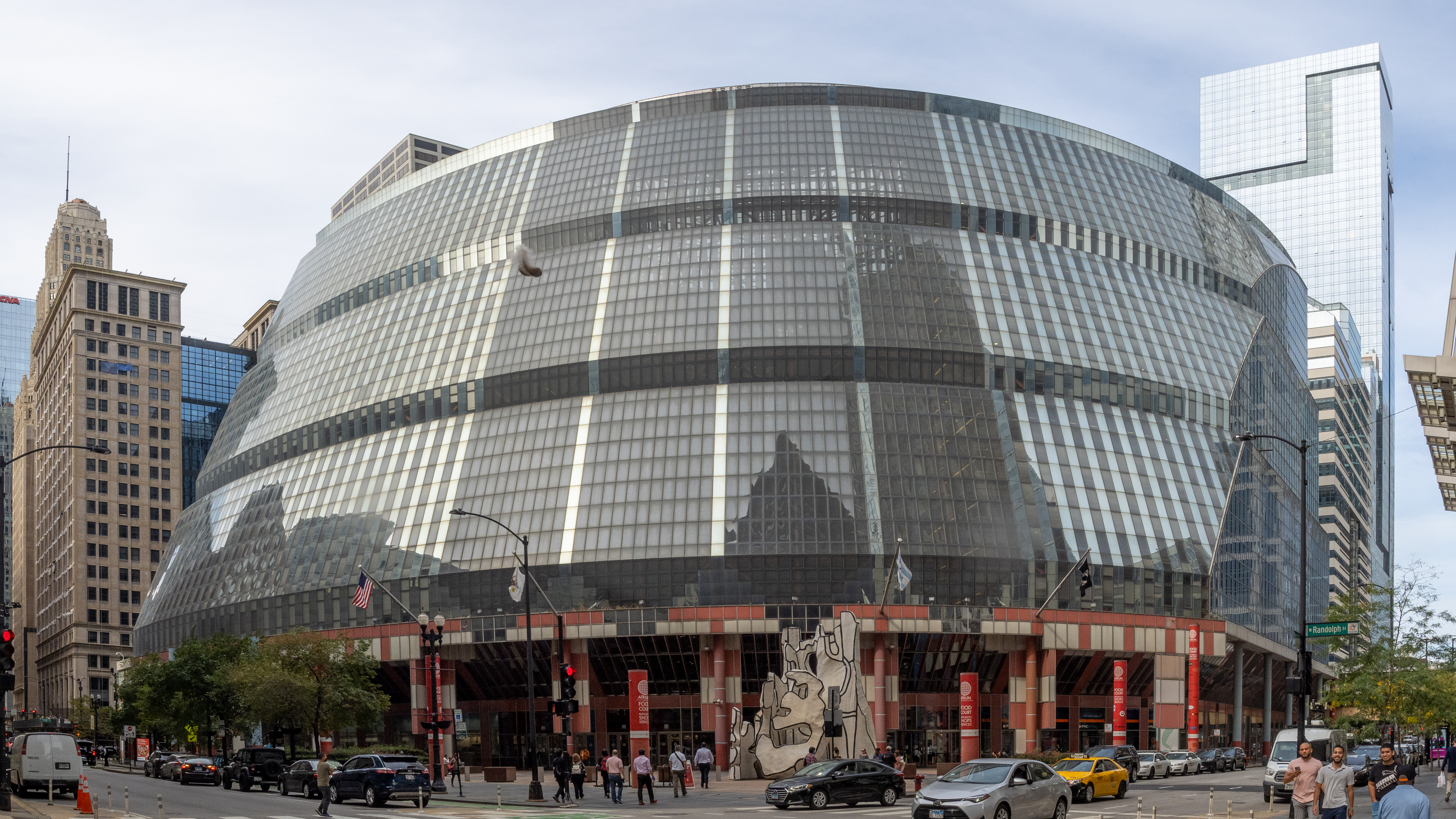
James R. Thompson Center, which formerly hosted offices of Illinois officials. Pat Gauen, columnist of the St. Louis Post-Dispatch, argued that Chicago is "de facto" state co-capital with Springfield.

Springfield is the state capital. Many state offices are in Springfield, and it is the regular meeting place of the Illinois General Assembly. All officers chosen in statewide elections are required to have at least one residence in Springfield, funded by the state government.

Cabinet officers and constitutional officers conduct much of their business at state offices in Chicago. In 2012, St. Louis Post-Dispatch columnist Pat Gauen argued that "in the reality of Illinois politics, [Springfield] shares de facto capital status with Chicago." According to Gauen, "Everybody who's anybody in Illinois government has an office in Chicago." University of Illinois researcher and former member of the Illinois legislature Jim Nowlan stated "It’s almost like Chicago is becoming the shadow capital of Illinois" and that "Springfield is almost become a hinterland outpost." A former director of the Southern Illinois University Paul Simon Institute for Public Affairs, Mike Lawrence, criticized state officials for spending so little time in Springfield since it estranged them from and devalued Illinois state employees in that city.

In 2007, Illinois state representative Raymond Poe sponsored House Bill 1959, which proposed ending state financing for officers' travel to Springfield. "The state capital is Springfield, and that should be their work location," said Poe.

== Local government ==
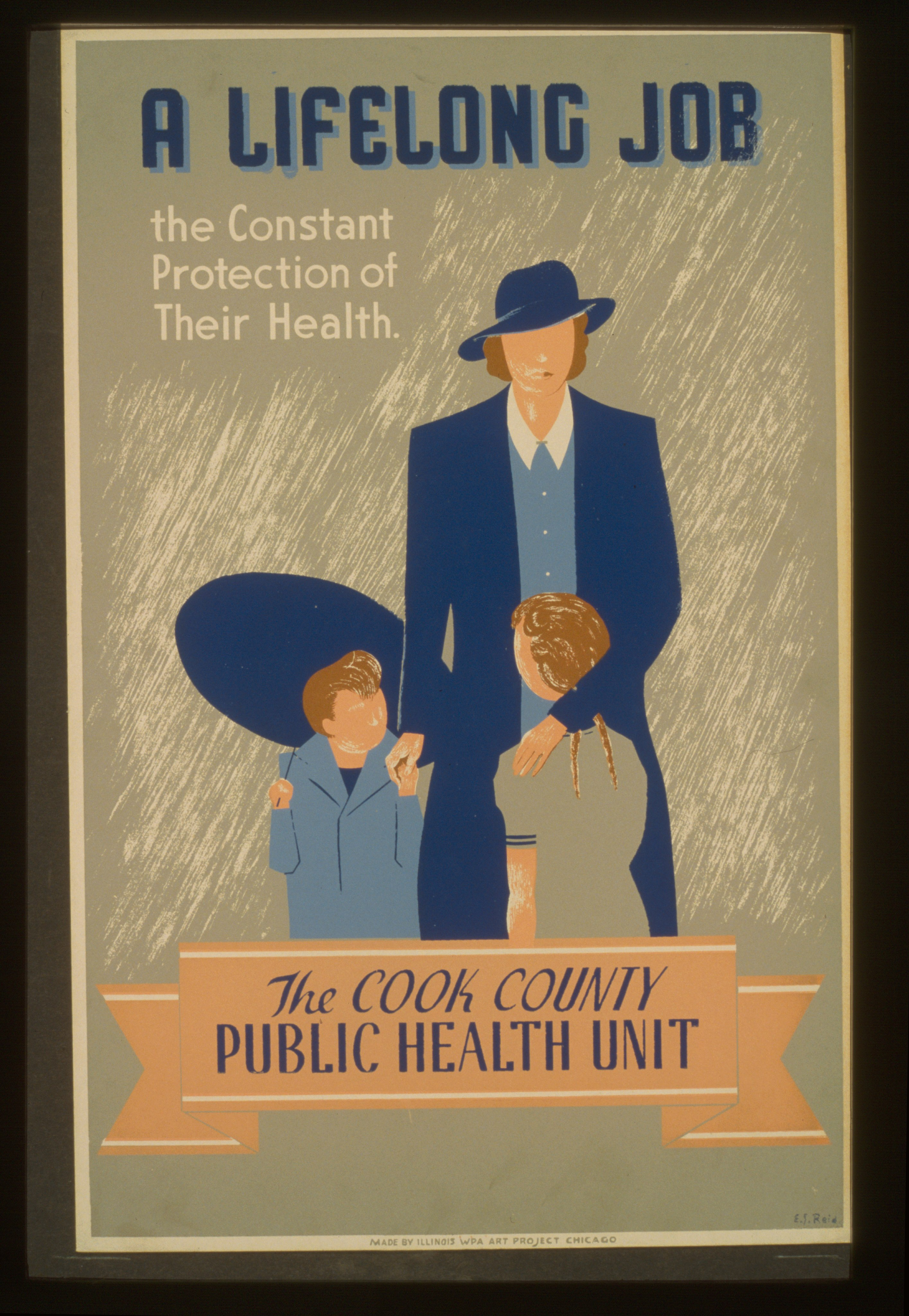
WPA poster for the Cook County Public Health Unit (1941)

The administrative divisions of Illinois are the counties, townships, precincts, cities, towns, villages, and special-purpose districts. Illinois has more units of local government than any other state—over 8,000 in all. The basic subdivision of Illinois are the 102 counties, of which 85 are in turn divided into 1,432 townships. Municipal governments are the cities, villages, and incorporated towns. Some localities possess "home rule", which allows them to govern themselves to a certain extent. Illinois counties, townships, cities, and villages may promulgate local ordinances. Illinois also has several types of school districts (including the Chicago Public Schools and the Illinois Community College System) and additional units of government that oversee many other functions.

== See also ==
- Elections in Illinois
- Illinois Budget Impasse
- Law enforcement in Illinois
- Law of Illinois
- Politics of Illinois
