= Law of Illinois =

The law of Illinois, a state of the United States, consists of several levels, including constitutional, statutory, and regulatory law, as well as case law and local law. Illinois state law is promulgated under the Illinois State Constitution. The Illinois Compiled Statutes (ILCS) form the general statutory law. The case law of the Illinois Supreme Court and state appellate courts is currently published online under a public domain reporting system. Interpretations of law and conflicts among the various levels of law are referred to the Illinois courts in suits for application of common law. The states administrative law is published in codified form in the Illinois Administrative Code. Local ordinances are published by the respective local authorities, which are granted that authority under state law.

== Sources ==
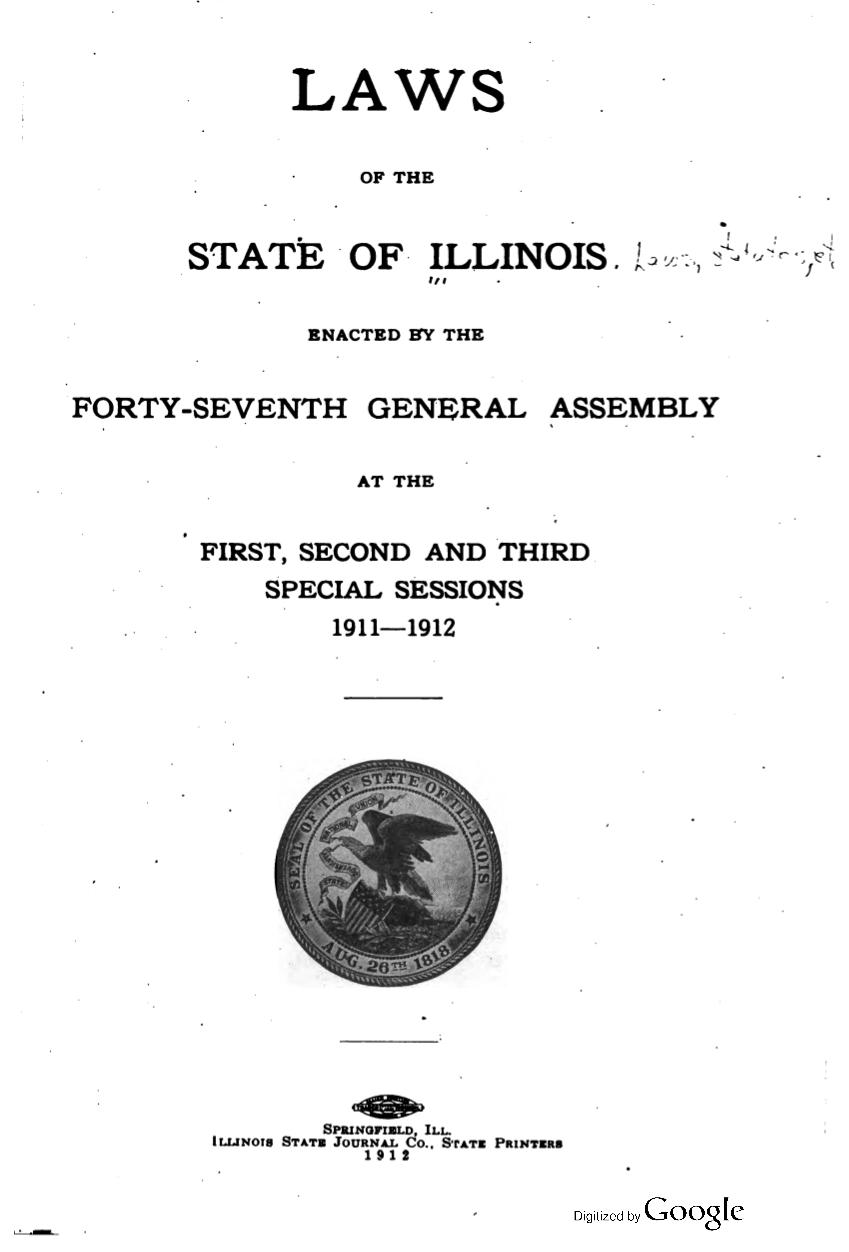
Title page of the 1912 Laws of Illinois

The Constitution of Illinois is the foremost source of state law. Legislation is enacted by the Illinois General Assembly, published in the Laws of Illinois, and codified in the Illinois Compiled Statutes (ILCS). State agencies publish regulations (sometimes called administrative law) in the Illinois Register, which are in turn codified in the Illinois Administrative Code. Illinois's legal system is based on common law, which is interpreted by case law through the decisions of the Supreme Court and the Appellate Courts, which are published on the website of the Supreme Court. Counties, townships, cities, and villages may also promulgate local ordinances. There are also several sources of persuasive authority, which are not binding authority but are useful to lawyers and judges insofar as they help to clarify the current state of the law.

=== Constitution ===
The Constitution of Illinois is the foundation of the government of Illinois and vests the legislative power of the state in the Illinois General Assembly. The Illinois Constitution in turn is subordinate only to the Constitution of the United States, which is the supreme law of the land.

=== Legislation ===
Pursuant to the state constitution, the Illinois General Assembly has enacted legislation. These legislative acts are published in the official Laws of Illinois and are called "session laws". The Illinois Compiled Statutes (ILCS) are the codified statutes of a general and permanent nature.

The Illinois Legislative Reference Bureau (LRB) makes additions, deletions, and changes to ILCS. There is no official version of the ILCS. There are several unofficial versions: Illinois State Bar Association's/West's Illinois Compiled Statutes, West's Smith–Hurd Illinois Compiled Statutes Annotated, and LexisNexis's Illinois Compiled Statutes Annotated.

=== Administrative law ===
Front page of volume 39 of the Illinois Register

Pursuant to certain statutes, state agencies have promulgated regulations. The regulations are codified in the Illinois Administrative Code. The Illinois Register is the weekly publication containing proposed and adopted rules. There also exist administrative law decisions.

Both the Illinois Administrative Code and Illinois Register are maintained by the Illinois Secretary of State. The Illinois Administrative Code was last printed in 1996. The General Assembly's Joint Committee on Administrative Rules also publishes online versions.

The Flinn Report is a weekly newsletter published by the Joint Committee meant to inform and educate Illinois citizens about current rulemaking activity.

=== Case law ===
Illinois's legal system is based on common law, which is interpreted by case law through the decisions of the Supreme Court of Illinois and the Illinois Appellate Court. The official reporter for opinions of the Supreme Court and the Appellate Court are published on the website of the Illinois Supreme Court using a public domain case citation. There are also unofficial sources such as West's Illinois Decisions (an Illinois-specific version of the North Eastern Reporter) with opinions since 1886. Illinois Appellate Court decisions from before 1935 are not binding. Illinois Circuit Court decisions are not published, but jury verdicts and settlements are published in the monthly Illinois Jury Verdict Reporter, with regular updates from the Chicago Daily Law Bulletin, and the weekly Cook County Jury Verdict Reporter. Decisions of the Illinois Court of Claims are published in the Court of Claims Reports.

The Illinois Digest is an indexed compilation of summaries of opinions, or digest.

The opinions of the Supreme Court and Appellate Court had been published in the Illinois Reports and Illinois Appellate Court Reports, respectively, from 1831 to 2011; according to the University of Chicago Library, since 1819 and 1877, respectively. Illinois Circuit Court decisions were published from 1907 to 1909.

=== Local ordinances ===
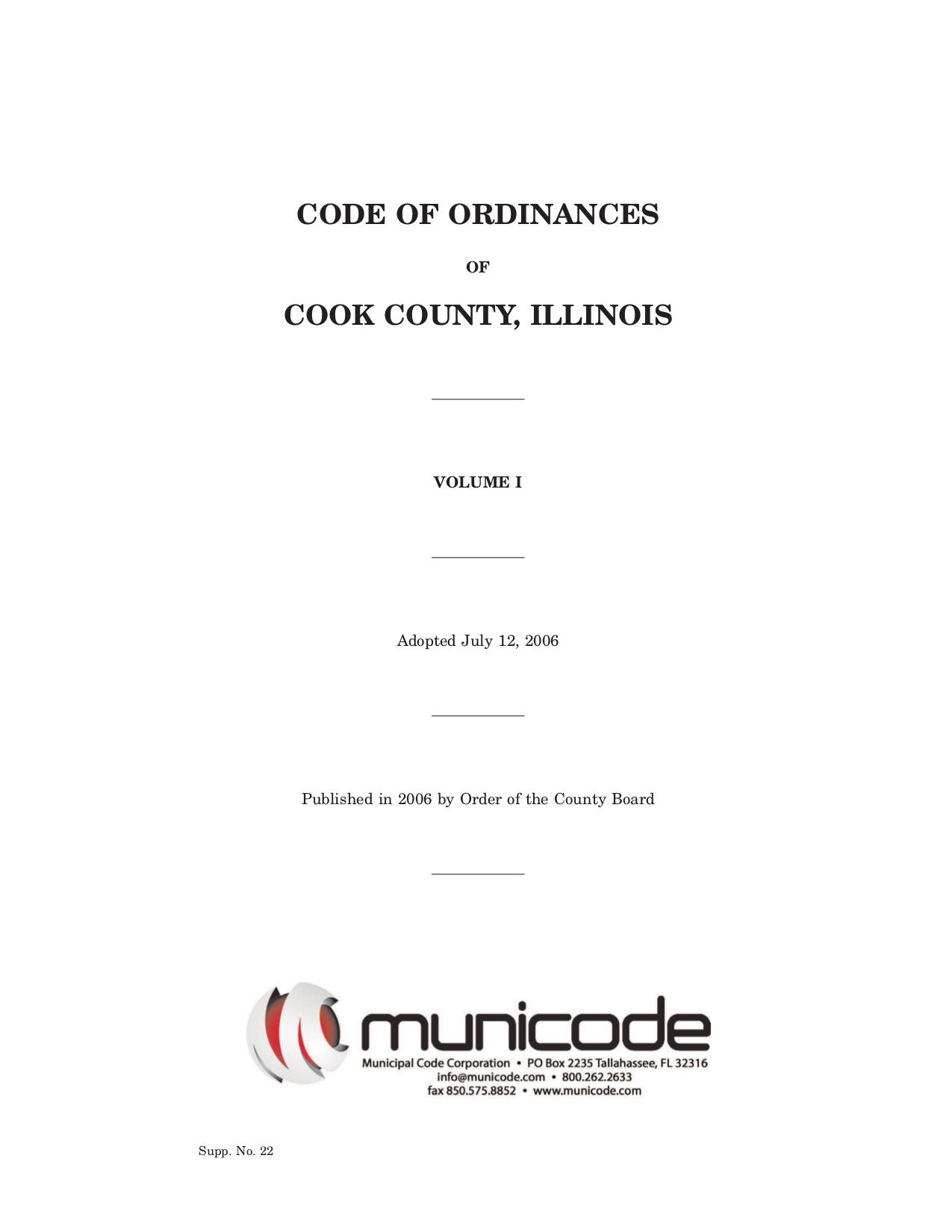
Title page of the Cook County Code of Ordinances

Illinois counties, townships, cities, and villages may promulgate local ordinances.

The Government of Chicago operates as a special charter municipality. The Journal of the Proceedings of the City Council of the City of Chicago is the official publication of the acts of the Chicago City Council, and the Municipal Code of Chicago is the codification of its local ordinances of a general and permanent nature.

Shepard's Illinois Citations includes judicial interpretations of local ordinances.

=== Other ===
In addition, there are also several sources of persuasive authority, which are not binding authority but are useful to lawyers and judges insofar as they help to clarify the current state of the law. Illinois Jurisprudence and Illinois Law and Practice are two major legal encyclopedias. The Illinois Institute for Continuing Legal Education (IICLE) also publishes guides for continuing legal education.

== Unique features ==
Illinois was one of the last remaining states to recognize the alienation of affections tort. However, recognition of the tort was statutorily abrogated at the beginning of 2016, pursuant to the Alienation of Affections Abolition Act.

== See also ==
=== Topics ===
- Gun laws in Illinois
- LGBT rights in Illinois
- Illinois wiretapping law

=== Other ===
- Politics of Illinois
- Law enforcement in Illinois
- Crime in Illinois
- Law of the United States
