= Judiciary of Illinois =

Unified court system of Illinois

The judiciary of Illinois is the unified court system of Illinois primarily responsible for applying the Constitution and law of Illinois. It consists of the Supreme Court, the Appellate Court, and circuit courts. The Supreme Court oversees the administration of the court system.

== Courts ==
=== Circuit courts ===
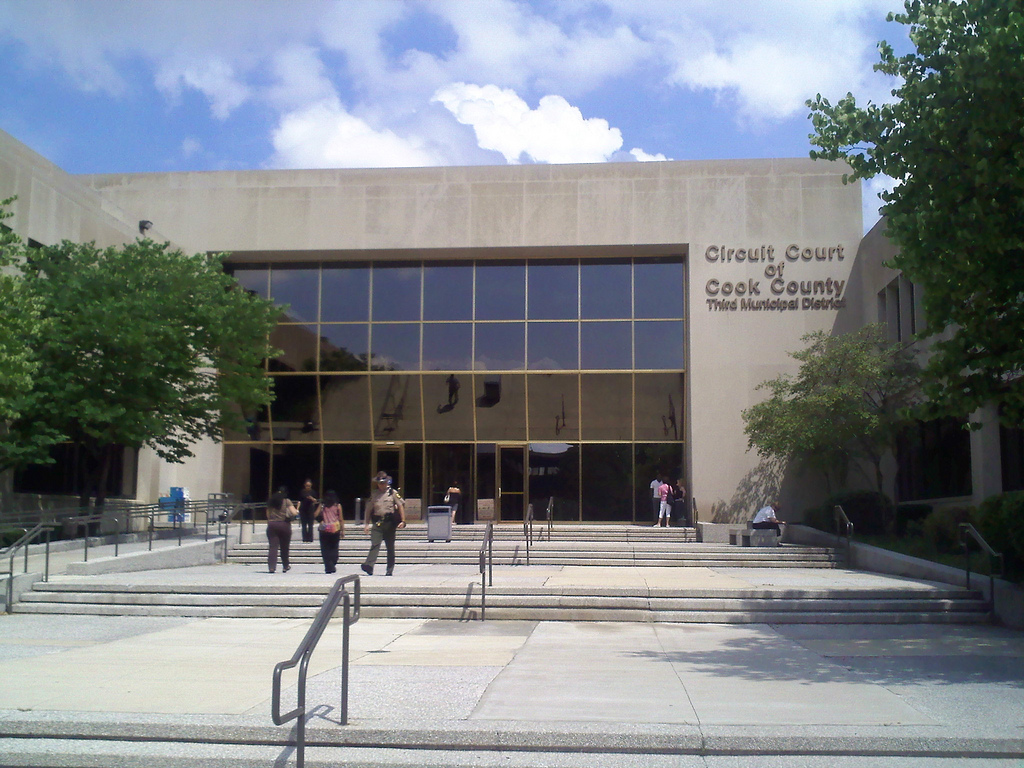
A Cook County Circuit Court courthouse in Rolling Meadows

The Illinois circuit courts are trial courts of original jurisdiction. There are 25 judicial circuits in the state, each comprising one or more of Illinois' 102 counties. Six circuits comprise solely of a single county; these are Cook, Kane, Will, DuPage, Lake, and McHenry. The other 18 circuits each contain between two and 12 counties.

The circuit court has general jurisdiction and can decide, with few exceptions, any kind of case. The exceptions are redistricting of the Illinois General Assembly and the ability of the governor of Illinois to serve or resume office. The circuit court also shares jurisdiction with the Supreme Court of Illinois to hear cases relating to revenue, mandamus, prohibition, and habeas corpus. However, if the supreme court chooses to exercise its jurisdiction over these cases, the circuit court may not decide them. The circuit court also reviews administrative decisions of certain state agencies.

There are two kinds of judges in the circuit court: circuit judges (elected) and associate judges (appointed by the elected judges). An associate judge can hear any case, except criminal cases punishable by a prison term of one year or more, unless the associate judge has received approval from the Chief Judge of the Circuit Court to hear other criminal cases.

=== Appellate Court ===
The Illinois Appellate Court is the court of first appeal for civil and criminal cases rising in the Illinois circuit courts.

Three Illinois Appellate Court judges hear each case and the concurrence of two is necessary to render a decision. The Illinois Appellate Court will render its opinion in writing, in the form of a published opinion or an unpublished order. As of 1935, decisions of the Illinois Appellate Court became binding authority upon lower courts in Illinois.

The Illinois Appellate Court has fifty-four judges serving five districts, administratively centering on Chicago (1st District), Elgin (2nd District), Ottawa (3rd District), Springfield (4th District), and Mt. Vernon (5th District).

Civil cases appealed from the Illinois Appellate Court are heard by the Supreme Court of Illinois upon the grant of a Petition for Leave to Appeal under Illinois Supreme Court Rule 315, a Certificate of Importance under Illinois Supreme Court Rule 316, or a Petition for Appeal as a Matter of Right under Illinois Supreme Court Rule 317. The same rules apply to criminal cases.

=== Supreme Court ===
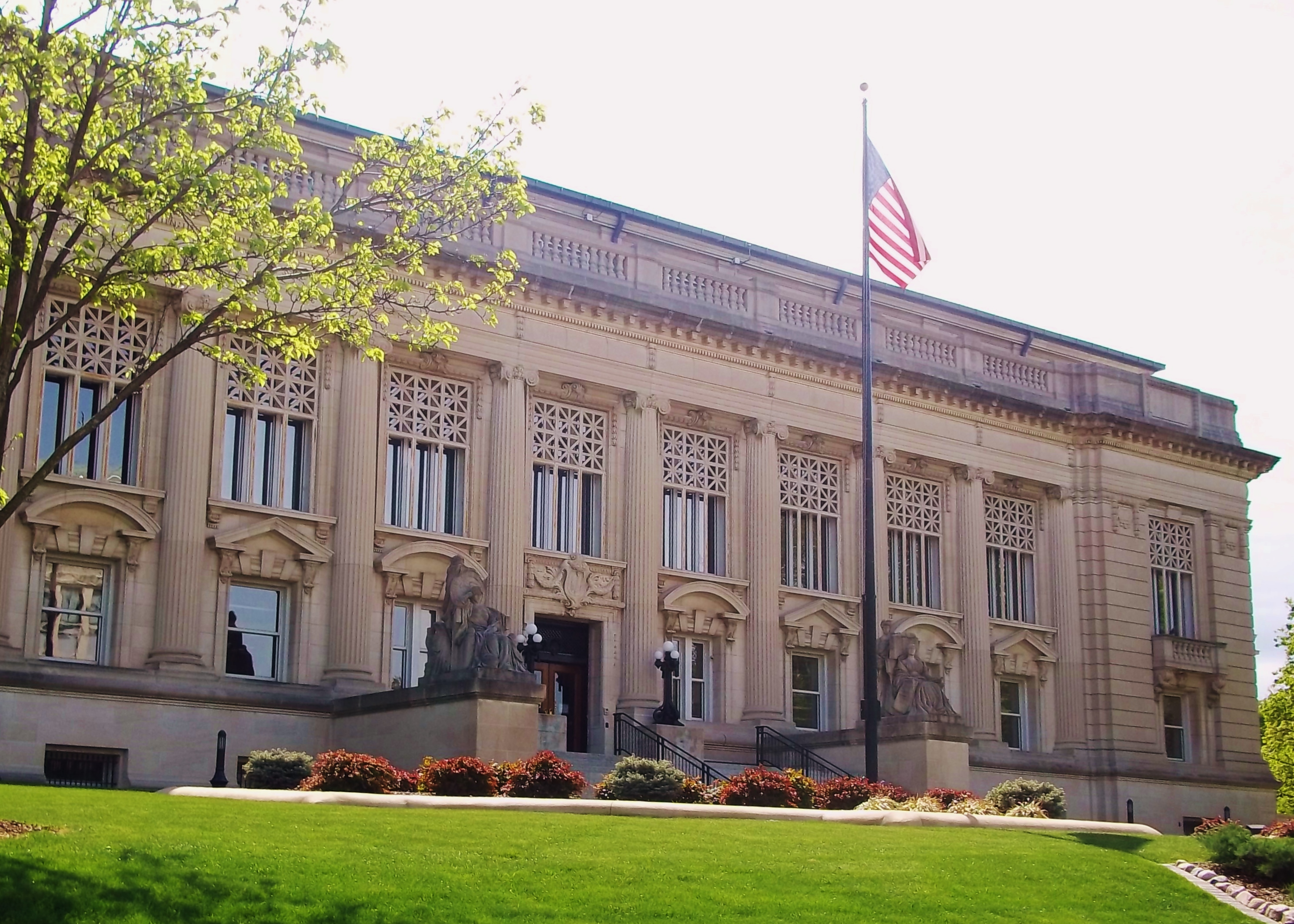
The Illinois Supreme Court building in Springfield

The Supreme Court of Illinois is the state supreme court and consists of seven justices including a chief justice.

The court has limited original jurisdiction and has final appellate jurisdiction. Prior to the state's moratorium and abolition of the death penalty (see capital punishment in Illinois), the court had mandatory appellate jurisdiction in capital cases, and cases where the constitutionality of laws has been called into question as well as had discretionary jurisdiction from the Illinois Appellate Court.

=== Other tribunals ===
The Illinois Court of Claims decides all monetary claims against the government and is better characterized as part of the legislative branch.

== Administration ==
The Supreme Court oversees the administration of the court system. Along with the state legislature, the court promulgates rules for all state courts.

The Administrative Office of the Illinois Courts (AOIC) assists the Supreme Court in administration, and is headed by the Administrative Director. The AOIC conducts the election process for the appointment of associate judges; provides support services to the courts and the judicial conference; develops the judicial budget; provides legislative support services to the courts; assists in the development and oversight of the judicial education plan; develops and monitors probation programs for the circuit courts and administrative-service training for all judges; collects and publishes statistical information on caseloads; and handles payroll for all judicial personnel. The Administrative Director also is secretary of the Illinois Courts Commission, and is an ex officio member of the Illinois Judicial Conference. The AOIC Executive Office plans and directs AOIC staff support for Supreme Court Committees and the Committees of the Illinois Judicial Conference.

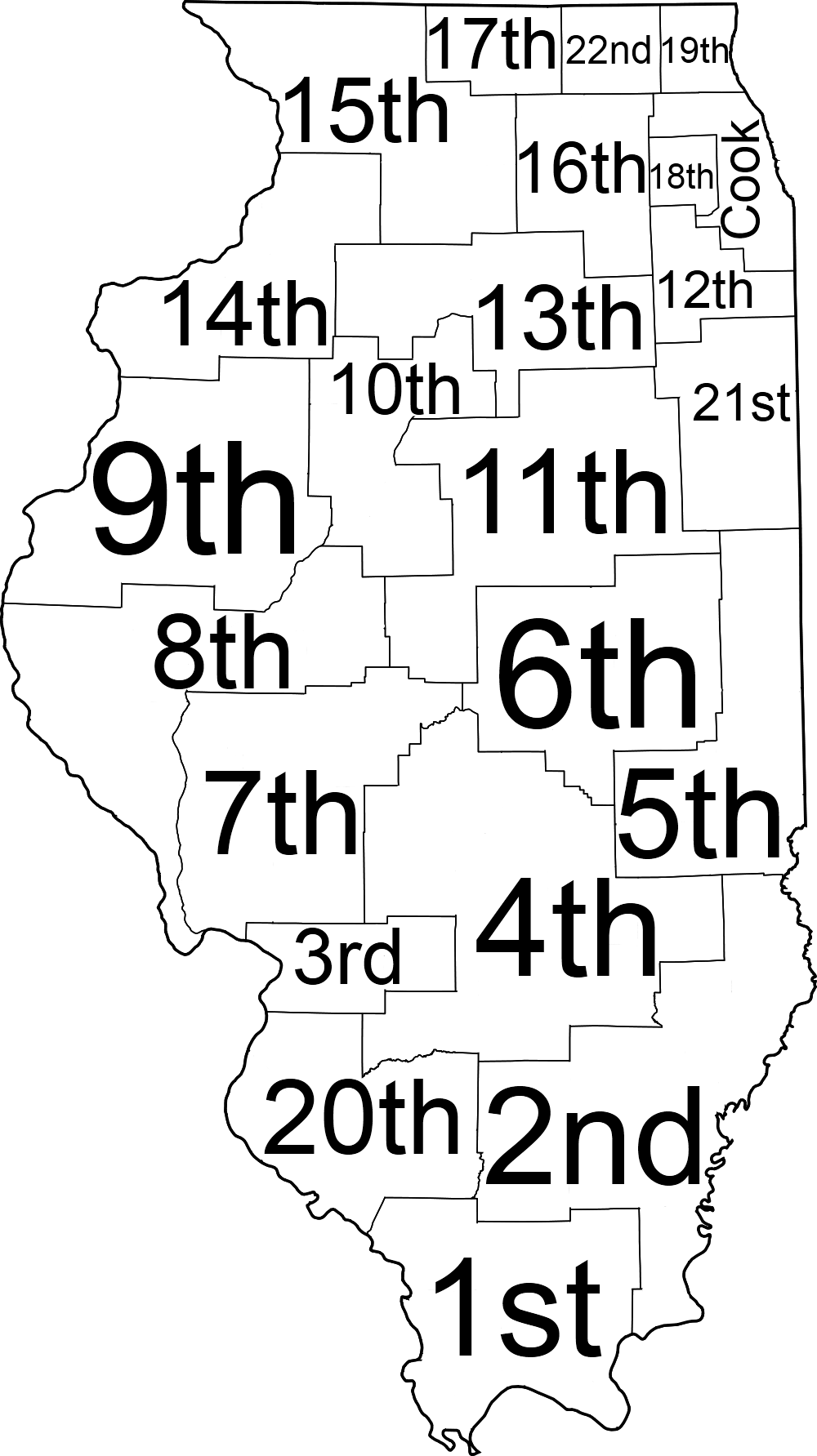
Map of Illinois judicial circuits

Several courts have been approved by the Supreme Court to operate electronic court filing (e-filing) systems. The official reporter for opinions of the Supreme Court and the Appellate Court are published on the website of the Supreme Court using a public domain case citation. There are also unofficial sources such as West's Illinois Decisions (an Illinois-specific version of the North Eastern Reporter). The opinions of the Supreme Court and Appellate Court had been published in the Illinois Reports and Illinois Appellate Court Reports, respectively, from 1831-2011. Illinois Appellate Court decisions from before 1935 are not binding. Jury verdicts and settlements are published in the monthly Illinois Jury Verdict Reporter, with regular updates from the Chicago Daily Law Bulletin, and the weekly Cook County Jury Verdict Reporter. Decisions of the Illinois Court of Claims are published in the Court of Claims Reports.

The Illinois Judicial Conference committees are charged with examining and making recommendations on matters of judicial branch policy. The Illinois Criminal Justice Information Authority published information about criminal justice issues in On Good Authority.

The chief justice of the Supreme Court is elected by the court from its members for a three-year term. Circuit judges in a circuit elect one of their members to serve as chief judge of the circuit court. Cases may be assigned to general or specialized divisions by the chief judge who has general administrative authority in the circuit, subject to the overall administrative authority of the Supreme Court.

== Officers and personnel ==
=== Judges ===
Some judges are elected while others are appointed. For elected offices, judges are nominated in party primaries and elected in partisan elections. The seven justices of the Supreme Court are elected from the five appellate judicial districts of the state: three justices from the First District (Cook County) and one from each of the other four districts. Each justice is elected for a term of ten years. The majority of the Appellate Court judges (18 in the First District, and between seven and nine in each of the Second, Third, Fourth, and Fifth Districts) are elected for a term of ten years, with the remaining judges having been appointed by the Supreme Court. Members of the Supreme Court also have the authority to elevate trial judges to the appellate court on a temporary basis.

There are two kinds of judges in the circuit court: circuit judges and associate judges. Circuit judges are elected for six years, may be retained by voters for additional six-year terms, and can hear any kind of case. Circuit judges are elected on a circuit-wide basis or from the county where they reside. In the Circuit Court of Cook County, which contains Chicago and is the largest of the 22 circuits in Illinois, circuit judges are elected from the entire county or as resident judges from each of the fifteen subcircuits within the county. Associate judges are appointed by circuit judges, under Supreme Court rules, for four-year terms. An associate judge can hear any case, except criminal cases punishable by a prison term of one year or more, unless the associate judge has received approval from the Chief Judge of the circuit to hear other criminal cases.

The Illinois Courts Commission, composed of one Supreme Court justice, two Appellate Court judges, two circuit court judges and two citizens, has the authority after notice and public hearing to remove from office, suspend without pay, censure or reprimand any member of the judiciary for willful misconduct in office, persistent failure to perform his or her duties, or other conduct that is prejudicial to the administration of justice or that brings the judicial office into disrepute; or to suspend, with or without pay, or retire any member of the judiciary who is physically or mentally unable to perform his or her duties. The Illinois Judicial Inquiry Board, created by the 1970 Illinois Constitution, has the authority to conduct investigations, receive or initiate complaints concerning any member of the judiciary, and file complaints with the Courts Commission.

=== Attorneys ===
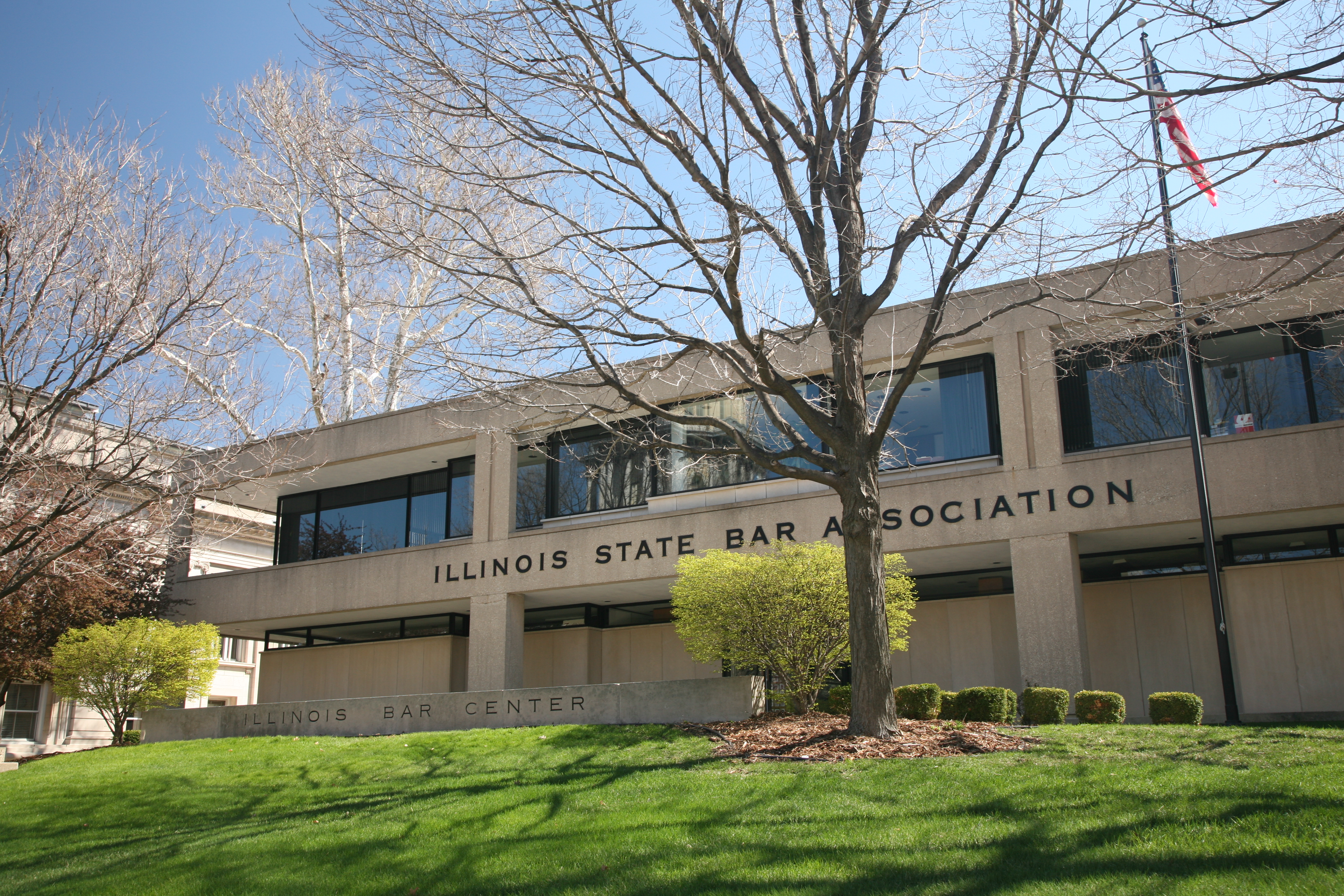
The Illinois State Bar Association headquarters in Springfield

The Supreme Court administers professional discipline through the Illinois Attorney Registration and Disciplinary Commission (ARDC), and they govern initial licensing through the Illinois Board of Admissions to the Bar, where the applicant must receive a certification of good moral character and general fitness to practice law by the Illinois State Bar Association (ISBA) Committee on Character and Fitness.

== Accusation of corruption ==
Accusations have been made of corruption in the Probate Division of the Circuit Court of Cook County, resulting in a three-year suspension recommendation against the accusing attorney by the Attorney Registration and Disciplinary Commission.

== See also ==
- Government of Illinois
- Law of Illinois
- Law enforcement in Illinois
