= Government of Chicago =

Political and legal structure

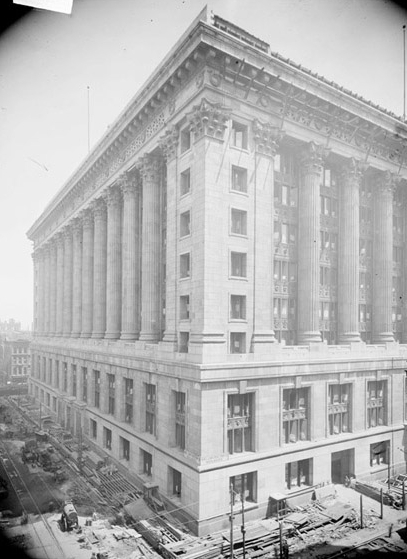
Chicago City Hall, shortly before construction was completed in 1911

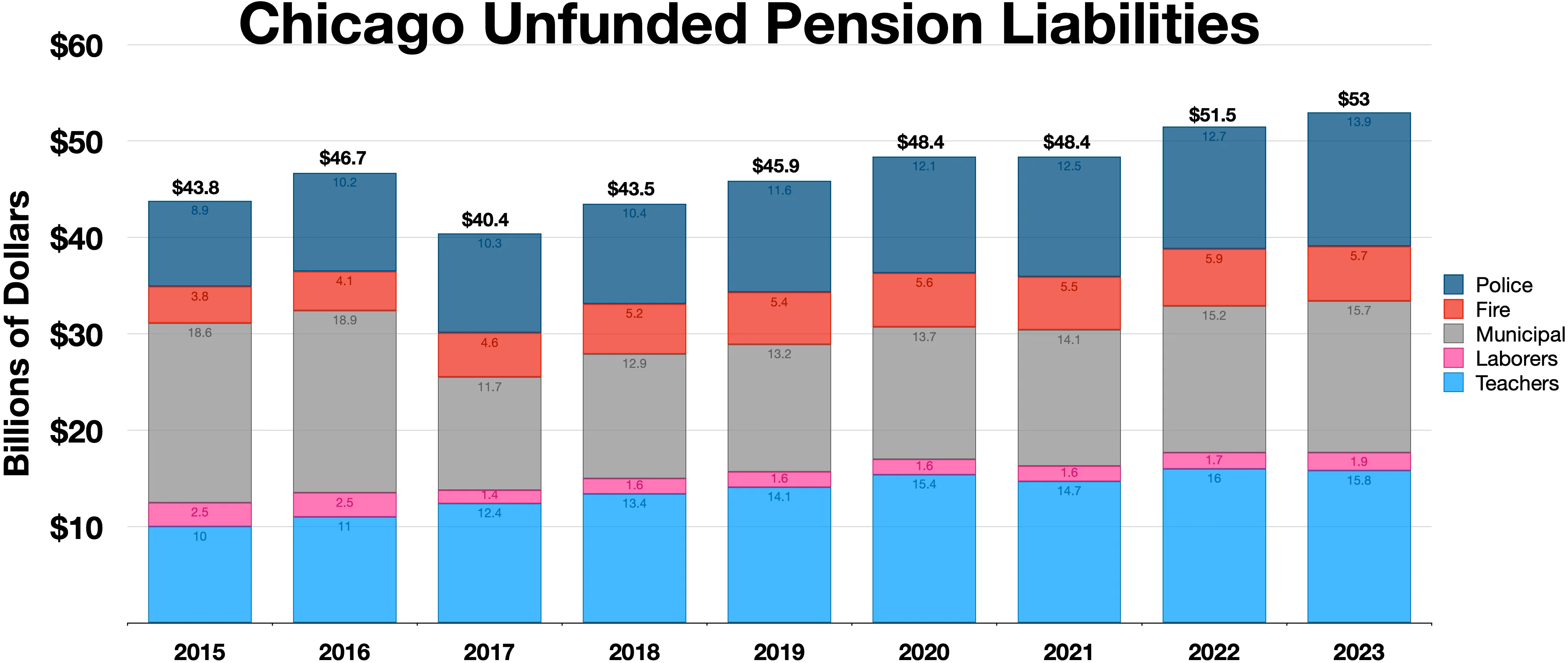
Chicago and Chicago Public Schools unfunded pension liabilities

The government of Chicago, Illinois, United States, is divided into executive and legislative branches. The chief executive of Chicago is the mayor, elected for a term of four years, with no term limits. The mayor appoints commissioners and other officials who oversee the various departments. In addition to the mayor, Chicago's two other citywide elected officials are the City Clerk and the City Treasurer.

The City Council is the legislative branch and is made up of 50 alderpersons, one elected from each ward in the city. The council takes official action through the passage of ordinances and resolutions and approves the city budget. Government priorities and activities are established in a budget ordinance usually adopted each November.

== Organization ==
Generally speaking, the mayor and city departments comprise the executive branch of the city government, and the city council comprises the legislative branch. However, the mayor does have some formal legislative functions such as being the presiding officer of the council and being able to break tie votes, and informally has dominated legislative activity since the late 19th century. On the other hand, the council has oversight authority over city departments. The city treasurer and city clerk are the only other directly elected positions in the city government, and are independent from the mayor's office and the council.

=== City departments and agencies ===
The below city departments and agencies operate as part of the executive branch, under the Office of the Mayor:

==== Finance and Administration ====
- Department of Administrative Hearings
- Department of Finance
- Department of Fleet and Facility Management
- Department of Law
- Department of Human Resources
- Department of Technology and Innovation
- Department of Procurement Services
- Office of Budget and Management

==== Legislative and Elections ====
- Board of Election Commissioners

==== City Development ====
- Department of Cultural Affairs and Special Events
- Department of Housing
- Department of Planning and Development

==== Community Services ====
- Board of Health
  - Department of Public Health
- Commission on Human Relations
- Department of Family and Support Services
- Mayor's Office for People with Disabilities
- Public Libraries

==== Public Safety ====
- Fire Department
- Police Board
  - Civilian Office of Police Accountability
  - Police Department
- Office of Emergency Management and Communications

==== Regulatory ====
- Office of the Inspector General
- Department of Buildings
- Department of Business Affairs and Consumer Protection
- Chicago Animal Care and Control
- License Appeal Commission
- Board of Ethics

==== Infrastructure Services ====
- Department of Aviation
- Department of Streets and Sanitation
- Department of Transportation
- Department of Water Management

=== Other city agencies ===
Other city-level government bodies include:

- The Chicago Board of Education, which oversees the Chicago Public Schools system, and whose members are appointed by the mayor
- The Chicago Housing Authority, a not-for-profit municipal corporation whose board of commissioners is appointed by the mayor
- The Chicago Water Department, oversees water utility. Water Commissioner is appointed by the Mayor and confirmed by the City Alderpersons. Services they handle includes: Metersave, Water Quality Reports, Sewer Regulations, Pay Water Bills Online, Conservation, Education, Chicago Water Quality, as well as, Full Payment Certifications.
- The City Council Office of Financial Analysis (COFA) was created in 2015 to provide the City Council with independent analysis of the fiscal implications of the issues before it. COFA works with the City Council's Committee on Budget and Government Operations, and applies the tools of financial analysis to budget recommendations and forecasts, the city's annual audit, proposed public-private partnership agreements or asset leases, bond rating agency actions, and other matters as requested by Alderpersons. COFA also provides an options report of potential cost-saving reforms and efficiencies.
- The Board of Trustees of the City Colleges of Chicago, whose members are appointed by the mayor with the approval of the council (except one elected student member)

== Law ==
Chicago is a special charter municipality. The Journal of the Proceedings of the City Council of the City of Chicago is the official publication of the acts of the City Council. The Municipal Code of Chicago is the codification of Chicago's local ordinances of a general and permanent nature.

== Other governments ==
Chicago is also part of Cook County. The Government of Cook County is primarily composed of the Board of Commissioners, other elected officials such as the Sheriff, State's Attorney, Treasurer, Board of Review, Clerk, Assessor, Recorder, Circuit Court judges and Circuit Court Clerk, as well as numerous other officers and entities. Illinois State police also operate in Chicago.

Other agencies that operate in the city of Chicago include the Chicago Transit Authority and the Metropolitan Pier and Exposition Authority, both of which were created by the state government of Illinois.

The United States Postal Service operates post offices in Chicago. The main Chicago Post Office is located at 433 West Harrison Street in the Near West Side community area. The post office is the only 24-hour post office in the United States.

=== State government ===
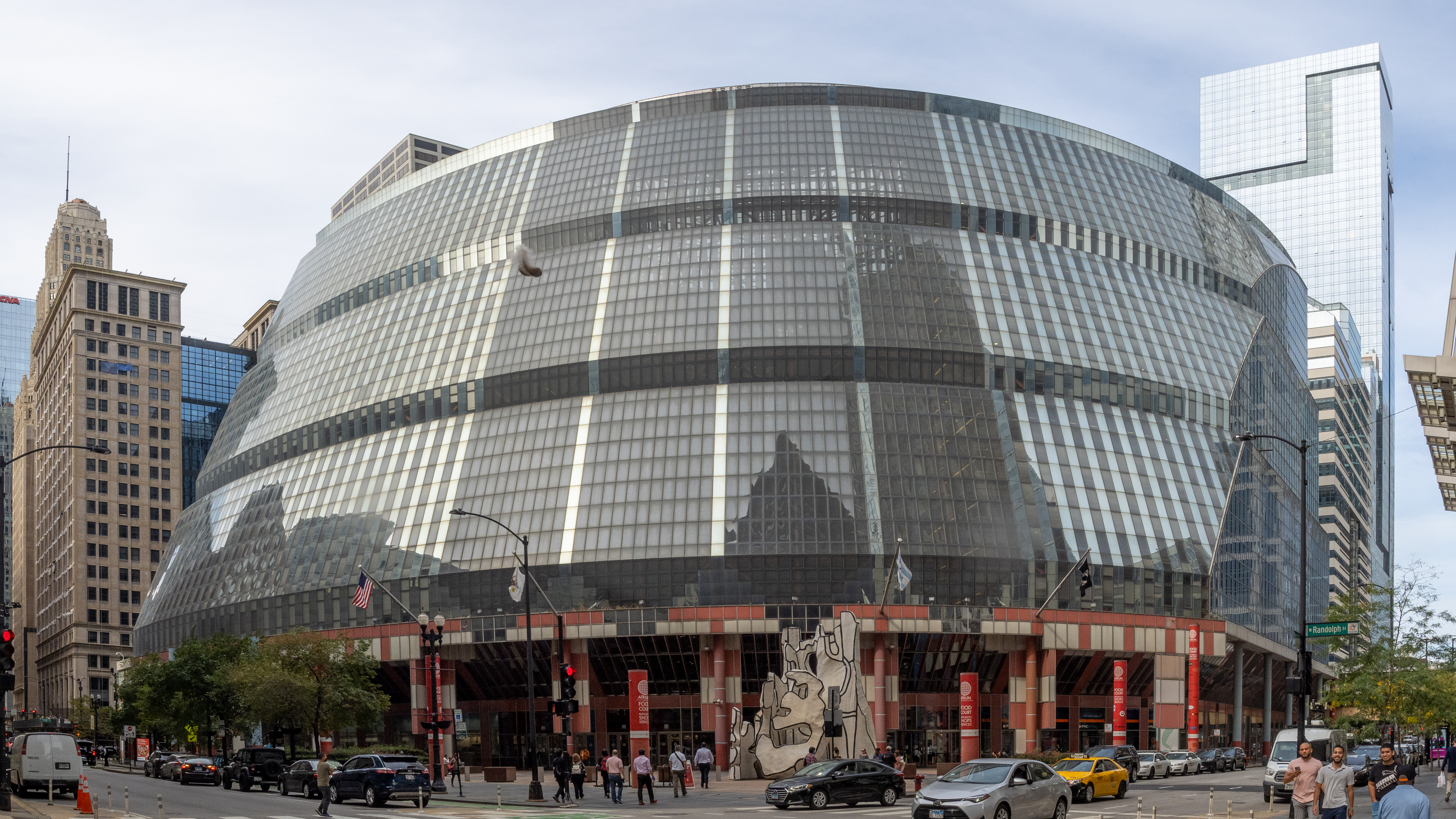
James R. Thompson Center, which has offices of Illinois officials. Pat Gauen, columnist of the St. Louis Post-Dispatch, argued that Chicago is "de facto" state co-capital with Springfield

As of 2012 most cabinet officers and constitutional officers of the Government of Illinois conduct a majority of their business in Chicago, with offices at the James R. Thompson Center. In 2012, St. Louis Post-Dispatch columnist Pat Gauen argued that "in the reality of Illinois politics, [Springfield] shares de facto capital status with Chicago." According to Gauen, "Everybody who's anybody in Illinois government has an office in Chicago." University of Illinois researcher and former member of the Illinois legislature Jim Nowlan stated "It's almost like Chicago is becoming the shadow capital of Illinois" and that "Springfield is almost become a hinterland outpost." A former director of the Southern Illinois University Paul Simon Institute for Public Affairs, Mike Lawrence, criticized state officials for spending so little time in Springfield since it estranged them from and devalued Illinois state employees in that city.

== See also ==
- Sister cities of Chicago
- Flag of Chicago
- Government of Illinois
