= Courts of Illinois =

Courts of Illinois include:

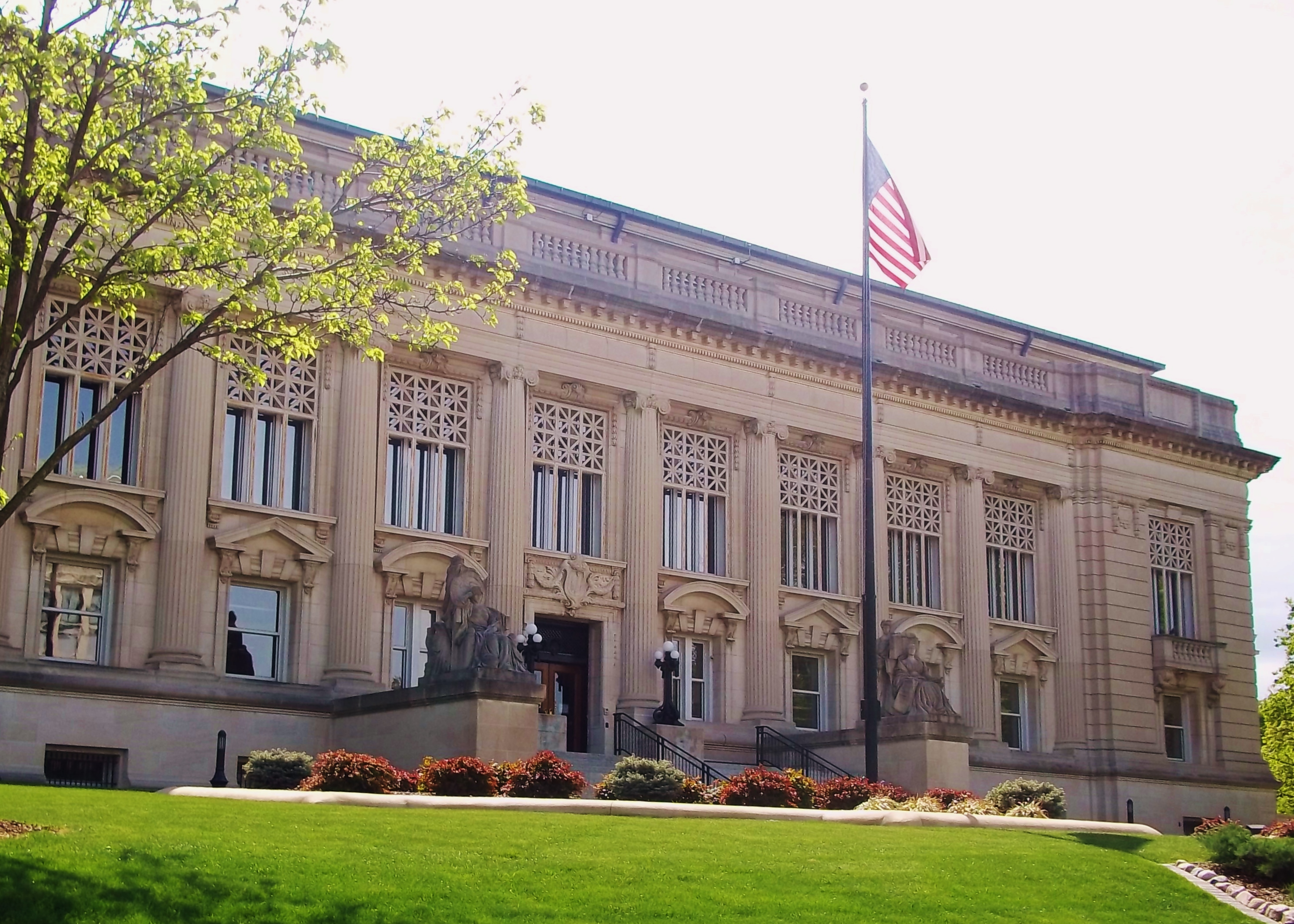
Illinois Supreme Court building, in Springfield, Illinois

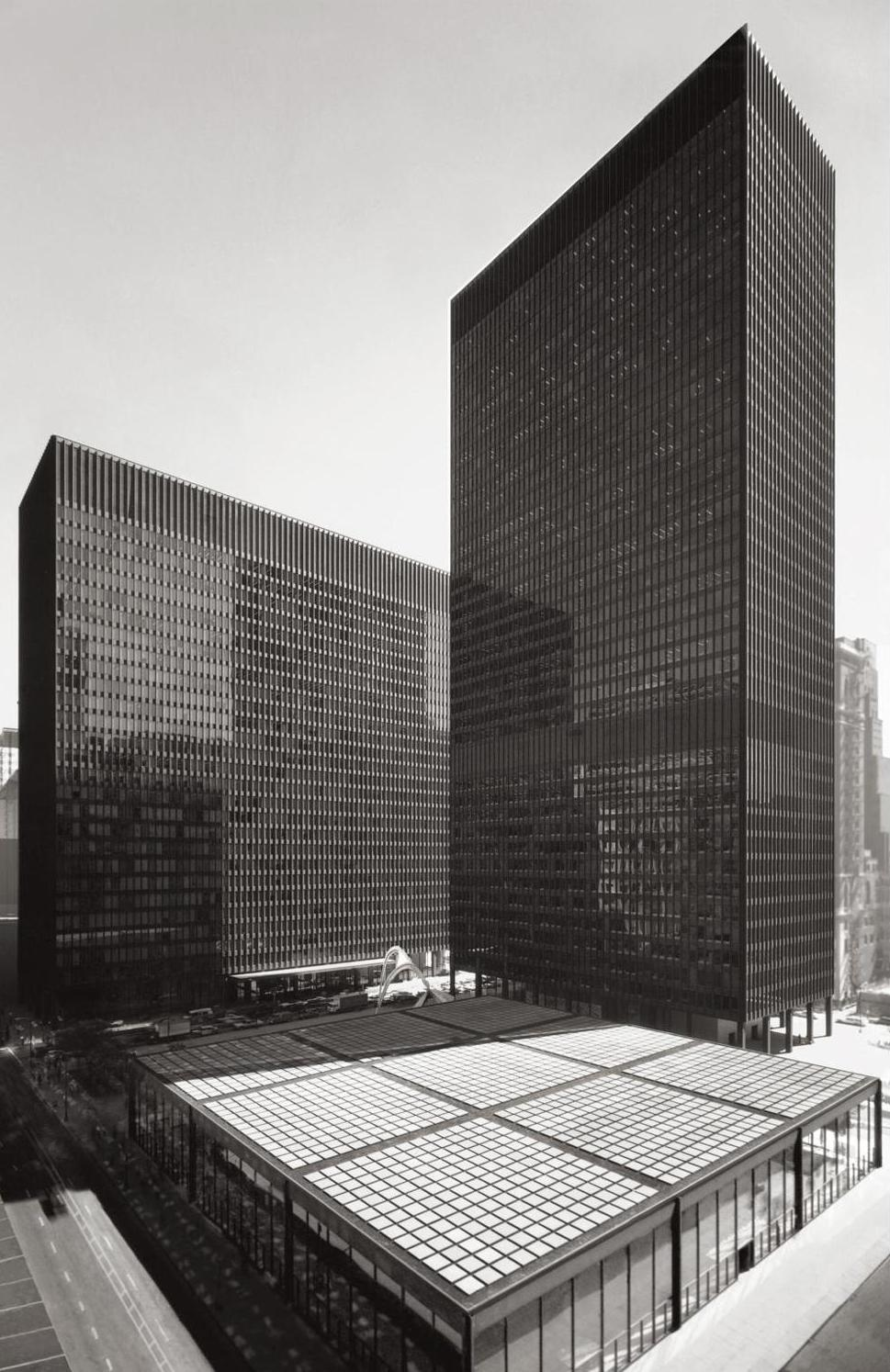
The Dirksen Federal Building in Chicago, headquarters of the United States Court of Appeals for the Seventh Circuit.

State courts of Illinois

- Supreme Court of Illinois
  - Illinois Appellate Court (5 districts)
    - Illinois Circuit Courts (24 judicial circuits)

Federal courts located in Illinois

- United States Court of Appeals for the Seventh Circuit (headquartered in Chicago, having jurisdiction over the United States District Courts of Illinois, Indiana, and Wisconsin)
- United States District Court for the Northern District of Illinois
- United States District Court for the Central District of Illinois
- United States District Court for the Southern District of Illinois

Former federal courts of Illinois

- United States District Court for the District of Illinois (extinct, subdivided in 1855)
- United States District Court for the Eastern District of Illinois (extinct, reorganized in 1978)

== See also ==
- Judiciary of Illinois
