= Eighteenth Judicial Circuit Court =

Eighteenth Judicial Circuit Court may refer to:

- Eighteenth Judicial Circuit Court of Florida
- Eighteenth Judicial Circuit Court of Illinois
