= Illinois wiretapping law =

Illinois's wiretapping law (720 Illinois Compiled Statutes 5 / Criminal Code of 2012. Article 14, also called the Illinois eavesdropping law) was a "two-party consent" law. Illinois made it a crime to use an "eavesdropping device" to overhear or record a phone call or conversation without the consent of all parties to the conversation. The law was ruled unconstitutional in 2014 by the Illinois Supreme Court, but was replaced by a near-identical law later that same year.

== History ==
In 2009, Christopher Drew was arrested for "selling artwork without a permit" on State Street in the downtown Chicago Loop. He also had charges brought against him for "felony eavesdropping on a government official."

In August 2010, Tiawanda Moore had criminal wiretapping charges brought against her for secretly recording police officers with her BlackBerry when she was filing a complaint for sexual harassment. In August 2011, a jury cleared her of the charges brought against her, and in 2012, Moore filed a federal suit against the city, alleging "unreasonable seizure, false arrest and malicious prosecution".

== Court proceedings ==
In 2010, the American Civil Liberties Union filed the lawsuit ACLU v. Alvarez against Cook County State Attorney Anita Alvarez, to block prosecution of ACLU staff for recording police officers performing their duties in public places, one of the group's long-standing monitoring missions. On 2 March 2012, Criminal Courts Judge Stanley Sacks deemed the Illinois wiretapping law unconstitutional, potentially criminalizing "wholly innocent conduct". In November 2012, the Supreme Court declined to hear an appeal of this ruling.

On March 20, 2014, the Illinois Supreme Court declared the Illinois wiretapping law unconstitutional unanimously in People v. Melongo and People v. Clark.

== Revised law ==
Following the Melongo and Clark decisions, the state legislature drafted a bill amending the wiretapping statute to make it constitutionally compliant. The bill was injected into an unrelated piece of legislation, and was passed as SB1342 late in the legislative session. On December 30, 2014, Governor Pat Quinn signed the bill into law as Public Act 098-1142.

SB1342 makes changes to the original language of the wiretapping law, adding that in order to commit a criminal offense, a person must be recording "in a surreptitious manner". The bill's sponsors, Elaine Nekritz and Kwame Raoul, claim the law upholds the rights of citizens to record in public.

== See also ==
- Law of Illinois
- Glik v. Cunniffe
