= Illinois Administrative Code =

The Illinois Administrative Code (Ill. Adm. Code or IAC) is the official compilation of the administrative rules of Illinois state agencies published in the Illinois Register, and is maintained by the Illinois Secretary of State in cooperation with the Joint Committee on Administrative Rules. The Illinois Administrative Code was last printed in 1996, but is available online from the Illinois General Assembly's website.

The Illinois Administrative Procedure Act [5 ILCS 100] governs the rulemaking process in Illinois.

== Style ==
The Secretary of State maintains the style manual for the Illinois Administrative Code and Illinois Register on its website. One notable feature of the Code and Register text is the use of italics (or, in less recently updated sections, all caps) to indicate that a particular set of words is quoting or closely summarizing statutory text; a reference to the relevant section of the Illinois Compiled Statutes should be provided in brackets after the italicized text.

== See also ==
- Illinois Register
- Law of Illinois
- Rulemaking in Illinois
