= Illinois Department of Labor =

State agency in Illinois, United States

Department of Labor
Department overview
- Jurisdiction: Illinois
- Employees: 107
- Annual budget: $12,495,400
- Department executive: Jane Flanagan, Director of Labor
- Website: www.illinois.gov/idol/

The Illinois Department of Labor (IDOL) is the code department of the Illinois state government that is responsible for the administration and enforcement of more than 20 labor and safety laws. Its director is Jane Flanagan, who was appointed in by Governor J. B. Pritzker.

Beginning in 2015, it will also be responsible for enforcing the Job Opportunities For Qualified Applicants Act, which prohibits employers from inquiring into, considering, or requiring the disclosure of a job applicant's criminal history or background on a job application.

== See also ==
- Illinois Department of Employment Security
