= Illinois Department of Employment Security =

U.S. state government agency

Department of Employment Security
Department overview
- Jurisdiction: Illinois
- Department executive: Jeffrey D. Mays, Director of Employment Security
- Website: www.ides.illinois.gov

The Illinois Department of Employment Security (IDES) is the code department of the Illinois state government that administers state unemployment benefits, runs the employment service and Illinois Job Bank, and publishes labor market information. As of 12 January 2015, Jeffrey D. Mays was the Director of Employment Security.

== Structure ==
The board of review consists of 5 members, 2 of whom are representative citizens chosen from the employee class, 2 of whom are representative citizens chosen from the employing class, and one of whom is a representative citizen not identified with either the employing or employee classes.

The Employment Security Advisory Board is composed of 12 persons, 4 of whom are representative citizens chosen from the employee class, 4 of whom are representative citizens chosen from the employing class, and 4 of whom are representative citizens not identified with either the employing class or the employee class.

== See also ==
- Illinois Department of Labor
