= Laws of Illinois =

Laws of the State of Illinois

Laws of the State of Illinois
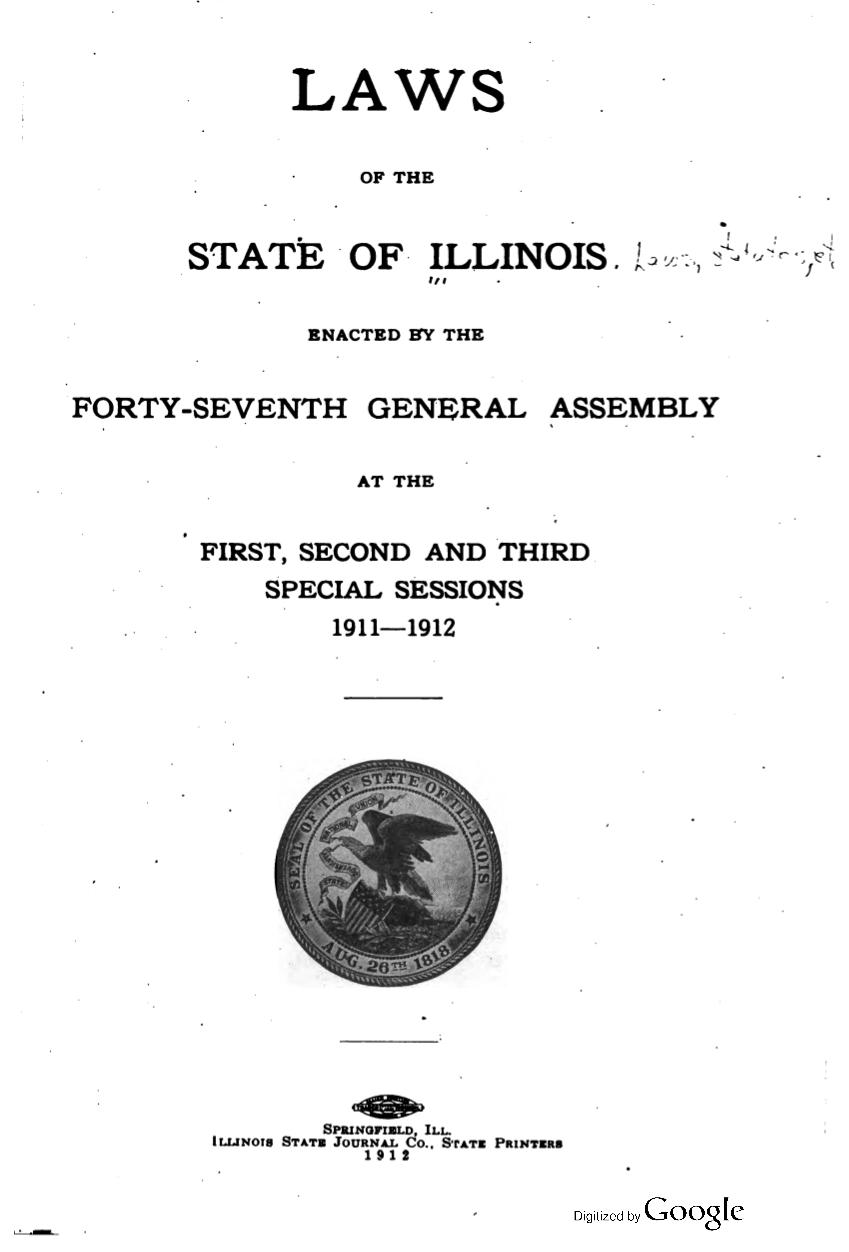
- 1912 volume
- OCLC: 4576847

The Laws of the State of Illinois are the official publication of the session laws of the Illinois General Assembly.

== History ==
Originally, the Illinois General Assembly met every two years, although special sessions were sometimes held, and the laws passed during a session were printed within a year of each session. Early volumes of Illinois laws contained public and private laws, as well as the auditors and treasurer's report for that biennium. Later, especially during and after the Civil War, public and private laws were printed in separate volumes.

== See also ==
- Illinois Compiled Statutes
- Law of Illinois
- United States Statutes at Large
