= Illinois Reports =

Illinois Reports is the official reporter of the Illinois Supreme Court and the Illinois Appellate Courts. It is published by Thomson Reuters, under contract with the Illinois Supreme Court Reporter of Decisions. The Illinois Supreme Court retains the copyright.

For purposes of citation, Illinois Reports and Illinois Reports Second are abbreviated "Ill." and "Ill. 2d"; although, the oldest volumes are abbreviated "Breeze", "Gilm.", and "Scam.", for Breeze's Illinois Reports, Gilman's Illinois Reports, and Scammon's Illinois Reports.

The publication is separate from Illinois Decisions—a popular unofficial reporter also published by Thomson Reuters—that contains additional materials, such as the West Key Number System.

== See also ==
- Illinois Appellate Reports
- Law of Illinois
