= Illinois Department on Aging =

Illinois public authority

Department overview
- Jurisdiction: Illinois
- Department executive: Mary Killough, Director
- Website: ilaging.illinois.gov

The Illinois Department on Aging is the code department of the Illinois state government that exercises, administers, and enforces all rights, powers, and duties vested in it by the Illinois Act on the Aging.

The current Director of Aging is Mary Killough. The Illinois Council on Aging, with its citizen and legislative members, serves as the advisory body to the Department on Aging.
