= Illinois Compiled Statutes =

Legal code of Illinois, U.S.

The Illinois Compiled Statutes (ILCS) are the codified statutes of a general and permanent nature of Illinois. The compilation organizes the general Acts of Illinois into 67 chapters arranged within 9 major topic areas. The ILCS took effect in 1993, replacing the previous numbering scheme generally known as the Illinois Revised Statutes (Ill. Rev. Stat.), the latest of which had been adopted in 1874 but appended by private publishers since.

Additions, deletions, and changes to the ILCS are done through the Illinois Legislative Reference Bureau (LRB), which files the changes as provided for by Public Act 87-1005.

The compilation is an official compilation by the state and is entirely in the public domain for purposes of federal copyright law; anyone may publish the statutes. There is no official version of the ILCS, but there are several unofficial versions: West's Illinois Compiled Statutes endorsed by the Illinois State Bar Association, West's Smith–Hurd Illinois Compiled Statutes Annotated, and LexisNexis's Illinois Compiled Statutes Annotated.

== History ==
Illinois officially revised its laws in 1807, 1809–12, 1819, 1827–29, 1833, 1845, and 1874.

== See also ==
- Laws of Illinois — the official publication of the acts passed into law, whether or not statutory
- Law of Illinois — in general
- United States Code — federal equivalent of the ILCS
