= Illinois Register =

Government gazette of Illinois

- Volume 39, issue 1 of January 2, 2015
- Type: Weekly government gazette
- Editor: Illinois Secretary of State
- Website: www.ilsos.gov/departments/index/register/

The Illinois Register (Ill. Reg.) is the official weekly publication containing proposed and adopted rules of Illinois state agencies. It is published online every Friday by the Illinois Secretary of State.

== Citation format ==
References to the Illinois Register contain the volume number (each volume is one calendar year) and the page number, which is continuously numbered over the course of a volume. For example, 42 Ill. Reg. 10808 refers to page 10808 of the 42nd volume (calendar year 2018). The Illinois Register's website includes references to page numbers to make it easier to find the correct issue, which in this example would be the 22 June 2018 issue.

== Archived volumes/issues ==
All issues of the Illinois Register since the 16 August 2002 issue (volume 26, issue 33) are available on the Secretary of State's website. Issues before that are available sporadically online via Google Books or the Internet Archive. For help in finding a particular issue, check with the Reference Desk at the Illinois State Library or the Joint Committee on Administrative Rules.

== See also ==
- Illinois Administrative Code
- Law of Illinois
- Federal Register
