= Politics of Illinois =

Illinois is considered a blue state, one of the three largest states that consistently supports Democratic Party federal candidates alongside California and New York. Following the 2018 elections, all six statewide elected offices are held by a Democrat. There is a significant division between Democratic-leaning cities and college towns, and highly conservative rural regions, which continue to be dominated by Republicans, but are drowned out due to their relatively low population.

United States presidential election results for Illinois
Year	Republican / Whig		Democratic		Third party(ies)	
Year	No.	%	No.	%	No.	%
1824	1,516	32.46%	1,272	27.23%	1,883	40.31%
1828	4,662	32.78%	9,560	67.22%	0	0.00%
1832	6,745	31.40%	14,609	68.01%	127	0.59%
1836	15,220	45.31%	18,369	54.69%	0	0.00%
1840	45,574	48.91%	47,441	50.92%	160	0.17%
1844	45,854	42.05%	58,795	53.91%	4,408	4.04%
1848	52,853	42.42%	55,952	44.91%	15,791	12.67%
1852	64,733	41.77%	80,378	51.87%	9,863	6.36%
1856	96,275	40.23%	105,528	44.09%	37,531	15.68%
1860	172,171	50.69%	160,215	47.17%	7,280	2.14%
1864	189,512	54.42%	158,724	45.58%	0	0.00%
1868	250,304	55.69%	199,116	44.31%	0	0.00%
1872	241,936	56.27%	184,884	43.00%	3,151	0.73%
1876	278,232	50.20%	258,611	46.66%	17,384	3.14%
1880	318,036	51.11%	277,321	44.56%	26,948	4.33%
1884	337,469	50.17%	312,351	46.43%	22,850	3.40%
1888	370,475	49.54%	348,351	46.58%	28,987	3.88%
1892	399,288	45.70%	426,281	48.79%	48,078	5.50%
1896	607,130	55.66%	465,613	42.68%	18,126	1.66%
1900	597,985	52.83%	503,061	44.44%	30,851	2.73%
1904	632,645	58.77%	327,606	30.43%	116,248	10.80%
1908	629,932	54.53%	450,810	39.02%	74,512	6.45%
1912	253,593	22.13%	405,048	35.34%	487,532	42.54%
1916	1,152,549	52.56%	950,229	43.34%	89,929	4.10%
1920	1,420,480	67.81%	534,395	25.51%	139,839	6.68%
1924	1,453,321	58.84%	576,975	23.36%	439,771	17.80%
1928	1,769,141	56.93%	1,313,817	42.28%	24,531	0.79%
1932	1,432,756	42.04%	1,882,304	55.23%	92,866	2.73%
1936	1,570,393	39.69%	2,282,999	57.70%	103,130	2.61%
1940	2,047,240	48.54%	2,149,934	50.97%	20,761	0.49%
1944	1,939,314	48.05%	2,079,479	51.52%	17,268	0.43%
1948	1,961,103	49.22%	1,994,715	50.07%	28,228	0.71%
1952	2,457,327	54.84%	2,013,920	44.94%	9,811	0.22%
1956	2,623,327	59.52%	1,775,682	40.29%	8,398	0.19%
1960	2,368,988	49.80%	2,377,846	49.98%	10,575	0.22%
1964	1,905,946	40.53%	2,796,833	59.47%	62	0.00%
1968	2,174,774	47.08%	2,039,814	44.15%	405,161	8.77%
1972	2,788,179	59.03%	1,913,472	40.51%	21,585	0.46%
1976	2,364,269	50.10%	2,271,295	48.13%	83,269	1.76%
1980	2,358,049	49.65%	1,981,413	41.72%	410,259	8.64%
1984	2,707,103	56.17%	2,086,499	43.30%	25,486	0.53%
1988	2,310,939	50.69%	2,215,940	48.60%	32,241	0.71%
1992	1,734,096	34.34%	2,453,350	48.58%	862,711	17.08%
1996	1,587,021	36.81%	2,341,744	54.32%	382,626	8.87%
2000	2,019,421	42.58%	2,589,026	54.60%	133,676	2.82%
2004	2,345,946	44.48%	2,891,550	54.82%	36,826	0.70%
2008	2,031,179	36.73%	3,419,348	61.83%	79,652	1.44%
2012	2,135,216	40.66%	3,019,512	57.50%	96,704	1.84%
2016	2,146,015	38.35%	3,090,729	55.24%	358,535	6.41%
2020	2,446,891	40.45%	3,471,915	57.39%	130,694	2.16%
2024	2,449,181	43.33%	3,062,893	54.19%	140,163	2.48%

Historically, Illinois was a critical swing state leaning marginally towards the Republican Party. Between its admission into the Union and 1996, it voted for the losing candidate just six times - in 1824, 1840, 1848, 1884, 1916, and 1976. However, following Bill Clinton's election in 1992, and his victory in Illinois, the state has been realigned in favor of Democratic candidates for president, with eight consecutive wins by that party, regardless of the national outcome. In 2000, George W. Bush became the first Republican to win the presidency without the state.

Traditionally, Chicago, East Saint Louis, and the Quad Cities region have tended to vote heavily Democratic, along with the Central Illinois population centers of Peoria, Champaign-Urbana and Decatur. In recent years, Chicago's suburban collar counties continue to trend Democratic as well, contributing to the end of its swing state status, even as rural areas became even more heavily Republican.

Rod Blagojevich, a Democrat, was elected as Illinois' Governor in 2002, the first Democrat elected since 1972. Blagojevich was re-elected in 2006, defeating Republican State Treasurer Judy Baar Topinka. However, in 2009, Blagojevich was impeached and removed from office due to charges that he abused his power while in office. Lieutenant Governor Pat Quinn succeeded him. Following Quinn's election to a full term outright in 2010, the state elected in 2014 Bruce Rauner, the first Republican chief executive in twelve years. Following the 2018 elections, J. B. Pritzker became the state's current Democratic governor.

== Statewide elected officials ==
Office	Officeholder	Party	Took office
Governor	J. B. Pritzker	Democratic	2019
Lieutenant Governor	Juliana Stratton	Democratic	2019
Secretary of State	Alexi Giannoulias	Democratic	2023
Attorney General	Kwame Raoul	Democratic	2019
Comptroller	Susana Mendoza	Democratic	2016
Treasurer	Mike Frerichs	Democratic	2015
U.S. Senator (Class II)	Dick Durbin	Democratic	1997
U.S. Senator (Class III)	Tammy Duckworth	Democratic	2017

== Voter registration ==
As of October 2016, Illinois had nearly 8 million active, registered voters.

== Federal representation ==
Illinois currently has 17 House districts. In the 118th Congress, 14 of Illinois's seats are held by Democrats and 3 are held by Republicans:

- Illinois's 1st congressional district represented by Jonathan Jackson (D)
- Illinois's 2nd congressional district represented by Robin Kelly (D)
- Illinois's 3rd congressional district represented by Delia Ramirez (D)
- Illinois's 4th congressional district represented by Chuy García (D)
- Illinois's 5th congressional district represented by Mike Quigley (D)
- Illinois's 6th congressional district represented by Sean Casten (D)
- Illinois's 7th congressional district represented by Danny K. Davis (D)
- Illinois's 8th congressional district represented by Raja Krishnamoorthi (D)
- Illinois's 9th congressional district represented by Jan Schakowsky (D)
- Illinois's 10th congressional district represented by Brad Schneider (D)
- Illinois's 11th congressional district represented by Bill Foster (D)
- Illinois's 12th congressional district represented by Mike Bost (R)
- Illinois's 13th congressional district represented by Nikki Budzinski (D)
- Illinois's 14th congressional district represented by Lauren Underwood (D)
- Illinois's 15th congressional district represented by Mary Miller (R)
- Illinois's 16th congressional district represented by Darin LaHood (R)
- Illinois's 17th congressional district represented by Eric Sorensen (D)

Illinois's two United States senators are Democrats Dick Durbin and Tammy Duckworth, serving since 1997 and 2017, respectively.

Illinois is part of the United States District Court for the Northern District of Illinois, the United States District Court for the Central District of Illinois, and the United States District Court for the Southern District of Illinois in the federal judiciary. The district's cases are appealed to the Chicago-based United States Court of Appeals for the Seventh Circuit.

== See also ==
- Elections in Illinois
- Government of Illinois
- Political party strength in Illinois
