= Illinois Court of Claims =

Quasi-judicial court in the US state of Illinois

The Illinois Court of Claims is a quasi-judicial entity in the State of Illinois.

== Powers ==
The Illinois Court of Claims has exclusive jurisdiction to hear all claims regarding any contract with the State of Illinois; torts committed by agents of the state; time unjustly served by innocent persons in Illinois prisons; torts committed by escaped inmates of state-controlled institutions; and lapsed appropriations claims. The Court of Claims administers assistance programs to compensate families of law enforcement officers, firefighters and military personnel killed in the line of duty. The court also vouchers awards to in nocent victims of violent crimes as authorized by the Crime Victims’ Compensation Act.

Mark Wojcik, a professor at University of Illinois Chicago School of Law, considers the Court more accurately a part of the legislative branch than the judicial branch.

== Structure ==
There are seven judges on the court of claims who are assisted by sixteen commissioners. The Illinois Secretary of State serves as the ex-officio Clerk of the Court of Claims. Judges on the Court of Claims are appointed by the Governor of Illinois and confirmed by the Illinois Senate. In 1987, state legislation increased the number of judges on the Illinois Court of Claims from five judges to seven judges.

== Incumbent judges ==
As of the publication of the 2021-2022 edition of the Illinois Blue Book, the below seven are:

- Peter J. Birnbaum, Chief Justice (appointed 2004)
- Mary Patricia Burns (appointed 2009)
- Joseph Gagliardo (appointed 2017)
- Michael McGlynn (appointed 2015)
- Robert J. Sprague (appointed 2019)
- Nancy Zettler (appointed 2019)

Past notable judges include Kirk Dillard, Roger Sommer, and Anne M. Burke.
