= Municipal Code of Chicago =

The Municipal Code of Chicago is the codification of local ordinances of a general and permanent nature of the City of Chicago. The Code contains original and new ordinances, adopted by the Chicago City Council, organized into eighteen titles of varying subject matter. The first Code of Chicago was adopted in 1837. The current Code, adopted 28 February 1990, wholly replaced and renumbered the previous Code adopted 30 August 1939. It is the responsibility of the City Clerk of Chicago to maintain a current copy of the Code, and revisions to the Code must be published at least every six months.

Building, Electrical, Fire Prevention, and Zoning Codes are contained within the Municipal Code and are published as separate volumes.

== See also ==
- Legal code (municipal)
