= Discretionary jurisdiction =

Power of a court to engage in discretionary review

Discretionary jurisdiction is a power that allows a court to engage in discretionary review. This power gives a court the authority to decide whether to hear a particular case brought before it. Typically, courts of last resort and intermediate courts in a state or country will have discretionary jurisdiction. In contrast, the lower courts have no such power. For this reason, the lower courts must entertain any case properly filed, so long as the court has subject matter jurisdiction over the questions of law and in personam jurisdiction over the parties to the case. Customarily a court is granted the power by rule, statute, or constitutional provision. When a constitutional provision establishes the court's power, it will have more limitations on its screening process. The usual intent behind granting power through a constitutional provision is to maintain decisional uniformity.

The power is coined as “discretionary” because a court may choose whether to accept or deny the petitioner's appeal. Moreover, discretionary jurisdiction is reactive rather than proactive. In other words, appellate courts do not search for cases review. Rather the court's exercise of discretion is in response to a petitioner's appeal of a lower court's decision or in a motion for rehearing made to the intermediate [appellate] court. Moreover, the highest [supreme] court's exercise of discretion is similar to the intermediate court, except that a supreme court will grant review at a much smaller percentage. For example, the United States Supreme Court merely grants review for five percent of its requests for discretionary review.

== United States ==
Generally, there are three tiers of court at the state and federal levels in the United States: trial, intermediate (appellate) court, and court of last resort (supreme court).

This structure creates a two-tier appellate system. The system affords a litigant one appeal as a matter of right after trial. The state's or district's intermediate court will review the first appeal, and after the intermediate court renders a decision, the supreme court will conduct any further review. However, unlike the first appeal, a litigant is not entitled to a successive appeal by the supreme court. Alternatively, in a few cases, those of great importance, such as capital cases, may be appealed directly to the highest court as a matter of right.

At either tier, the court has two basic functions: "error correction" and "law declaring."

The "error correction" function allows the appellate court to examine the record to determine whether the lower court applied existing law correctly according to the law and applicable procedure. The function affords a litigant a second set of eyes and promotes the court's interest in fairness. It is the job of the lower court to adjudicate a matter in accordance with applicable legal standards. However, oftentimes a litigant will appeal, asserting that while the parties agree on the applicable law, they believe the trial court incorrectly interpreted the existing law or incorrectly applied the existing law to the facts. Thus, if the lower court makes an error, the intermediate or highest court will reverse or remand (sends back to the lower court) the case.

The "law declaring" function means that the appellate court rules on novel issues in a case, and under stare decisis, those rulings become new laws in themselves. In those cases where: (1) the parties disagree vigorously if any existing legal rule even applies to the facts of the case; (2) the appellant may be deliberately trying to attack an established rule hoping the appellate court will overturn a prior decision and establish a new rule; (3) multiple intermediate appellate courts have ruled upon the question and the question is so perplexing that all the lower courts disagree with each other.

An appellate court with discretionary jurisdiction can delegate error correction to lower courts while it focuses its limited resources on properly developing case law. In the latter situation, the appellate court will focus on truly novel questions or revisiting older legal rules that are now clearly obsolete or unconstitutional.

For example, the United States Supreme Court hears cases by a writ of certiorari, meaning that it calls appellants up to the court only if their case is important enough to merit the court's resources. The Supreme Court employs a "rule of four," meaning that four justices have to think the case is important enough to hear before the court will grant it a review. Many state supreme courts use a similar process to choose which cases they will hear.

=== The selection process ===
A judge's personal policy preferences and workload inadvertently drive the court's selection process or screening procedures. Generally, a court will select cases involving broad and significant policy questions that have produced uncertainties amongst lower courts as the higher courts are concertedly looking to establish uniformity in the law. Although uniformity is the court's primary responsibility, judges are more likely motivated by their policy goals. They will vote to accept cases if the believe they can improve their court's policies or make a decision more favorable to their own policy preferences.

=== Florida case study ===
In Florida, discretionary jurisdiction is a power assigned to the State's highest court through a Constitutional Provision. Florida's discretion in exercising power is likely the most limited of the States courts that employ the discretionary power jurisdiction. While the provision does not expressly state "discretionary jurisdiction," the categorical nature of the language restricts the use of the court's discretion. Like other federal and state court systems, Florida has a two-tier appellate system. A litigant can take two pathways to discretionary review: (1) directly petitioning the State's supreme court or (2) permission from the district court of appeal.

There are four instances where the State's supreme court can exercise discretion when to review: (1) district court decisions that expressly declare a valid state statute—even where the validity of the statute is not the issue before the court; (2) District Court decisions involving the interpretation of [a provision or term] of federal constitution; (3) when the district court's decision directly conflicts with another district's or supreme court ruling; (4) and district court decisions directly affecting the duties, powers, validity, formation, termination or regulation of constitutional or state officers.

When a litigant is petitioning the court for discretionary review, the litigant must file a notice in the district court w/in 30 days of "a notice to invoke discretionary jurisdiction. Wells v. State, 132 So. 3d 1110 (2014). This petitioner must file a notice to invoke within 10 days of filing the notice petitioner must submit a jurisdictional brief to the Supreme Court. If subject to the State's Supreme Court's jurisdiction. a panel of five justices, one of whom oversees the preparation of a memorandum analyzing whether there is a basis for the court's exercise of discretionary jurisdiction, will review the case. If four justices agree on a jurisdictional disposition of the case—based on the four instances listed above—the parties are notified of the court's decision, and the case proceeds accordingly.

== United Kingdom ==
In a 2011 hearing regarding two concurrent legal challenges to the proposed award of a public sector contract in Northern Ireland, where the court had made a decision regarding the first challenge, the judge handling the second challenge noted that his role to exercise "what is plainly a discretionary jurisdiction". In the particular circumstances of the case in First4Skills Ltd v Department for Employment and Learning, the judge (Mr Justice McCloskey) observed that it would be "incongruous" to exercise this discretion in the second case in a way which would annul the decision made in the first.
