= Law enforcement in Illinois =

Law enforcement in Illinois is complex with many overlapping jurisdictions related to the administrative divisions of Illinois.

At the state level, there are at least eleven law enforcement agencies. At the county level, there are sheriffs, forest preserve police and other specialized police forces. At the local level, most cities and many villages have municipal police forces, park district police forces, and even local specialized police forces. Many colleges also have their own campus police that are often sworn police officers.

In 2000, Illinois was ranked 4th in the U.S. in the number of full-time sworn officers with 321 per 100,000 persons, behind Louisiana (415), New York (384), and New Jersey (345). In this ranking, only New York had a higher total population than Illinois. Illinois is also near the top of most law enforcement numbers lists, such as number of agencies per state, number of agencies with special jurisdictions, and number of local police agencies. Even taking into account that Illinois is the fifth most populous state, many of the ratios are higher than more populated states.
