= Illinois Appellate Court =

Intermediate appellate court of Illinois

Court locations

The Illinois Appellate Court is the court of first appeal for civil and criminal cases arising in the Illinois circuit courts. In Illinois, litigants generally have the right to appeal first to the circuit court's final decisions or judgments. Three Illinois Appellate Court judges hear each case. The concurrence of two is necessary to render a decision. The Illinois Appellate Court will render its opinion in writing, in the form of a published opinion or an unpublished order. As of 1935, decisions of the Illinois Appellate Court became binding authority upon lower courts in Illinois.

The Illinois Appellate Court has 52 judges serving five districts. The majority of the judges (18 in the First District, and between seven and nine in each of the Second, Third, Fourth, and Fifth Districts) are elected, with the remaining judges having been appointed by the Supreme Court of Illinois.

Civil cases appealed from the Illinois Appellate Court are heard by the Supreme Court of Illinois upon the grant of a Petition for Leave to Appeal under Illinois Supreme Court Rule 315, a Certificate of Importance under Illinois Supreme Court Rule 316, or (for very limited type of case) a Petition for Appeal as a Matter of Right under Illinois Supreme Court Rule 317. The same rules apply to criminal cases.

== First District ==
The First District is based in Chicago and, unlike its counterparts, hears cases arising from Cook County alone. It is divided into six divisions, each with four different judges. The First District clerk's office, and the principal seat of the court are located in the Michael A. Bilandic Building, at 160 North LaSalle Street, Chicago, IL 60601.

== Second District ==
The Second District is based in Elgin and hears cases arising in five counties in northern Illinois (Kane, Lake, McHenry, DeKalb, and Kendall). The Second District has seven judges. The Second District clerk's office is located at Appellate Court Building, 55 Symphony Way, Elgin, IL 60120.

== Third District ==
The Third District is based in Ottawa and hears cases arising in seven counties in central Illinois (Will, Bureau, Grundy, LaSalle, Iroquois, and Kankakee). The Third District has seven judges. The Third District clerk's office is located at 1004 Columbus Street, Ottawa, IL 61350.

The Third District is based in Ottawa, IL, and hears cases arising in seven counties in Illinois (DuPage, Will, Kankakee, Iroquois, Grundy, LaSalle, and Bureau Counties.

https://www.illinoiscourts.gov/courts/appellate-court/districts-third-district/

== Fourth District ==
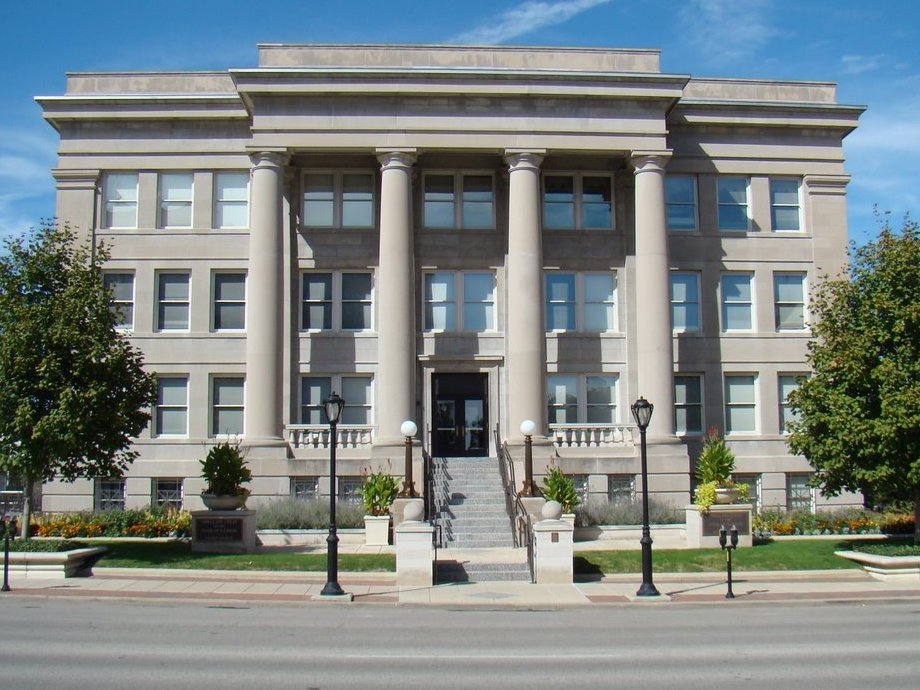
Fourth District Appellate Court building in Springfield

The Fourth District is based in Springfield and hears cases arising in 41 counties in central Illinois (Greene, Jersey, Macoupin, Morgan, Sangamon, Scott, Adams, Brown, Calhoun, Cass, Mason, Menard, Pike, Schuyler, Fulton, Hancock, Henderson, Knox, McDonough, Warren, Marshall, Peoria, Putnam, Stark, Tazewell, Ford, Livingston, Logan, McLean, Woodford, Henry, Mercer, Rock Island, Whiteside, Carroll, Jo Daviess, Lee, Ogle, Stephenson, Boone, and Winnebago). The Fourth District has ten judges. The Fourth District clerk's office is located at 201 West Monroe Street, Springfield, IL 62794.

== Fifth District ==
The Fifth District is based in Mount Vernon and hears cases arising in 48 counties in southern Illinois (Alexander, Jackson, Johnson, Massac, Pope, Pulaski, Saline, Union, Williamson, Crawford, Edwards, Franklin, Gallatin, Hamilton, Hardin, Jefferson, Lawrence, Richland, Wabash, Wayne, White, Bond, Madison, Christian, Clay, Clinton, Effingham, Fayette, Jasper, Marion, Montgomery, Shelby, Clark, Coles, Cumberland, Edgar, Vermilion, Champaign, DeWitt, Douglas, Macon, Moultrie, Piatt, St. Clair, Monroe, Perry, Randolph, Washington). The Fifth District has nine judges. The Fifth District clerk's office is located at 14th & Main Street, Mount Vernon, IL 62864. The Fifth District Appellate Court building has been listed on the National Register of Historic Places since July 2, 1973.

== See also ==
- Judiciary of Illinois
