= Session laws =

Type of United States law

Session laws are the collection of statutes enacted by a legislature during a single session of that legislature, often published following the end of the session as a bound volume. The United States Statutes at Large is an example of session laws which are published biennially, because the United States Congress meets for two years per session. Session laws are typically published annually or biennially, depending on the length of the session of the legislature, which in turn typically depends on the frequency with which general elections of the legislature are held.

Laws that are enacted during a session may modify existing statutes of the jurisdiction, or may need to be added to the collection of statutes. If the agency responsible for printing updated statutes has not yet published a new collection of statutes containing the amendments or additions passed during a recent legislative session, people who need to refer to the changes may refer directly to the session laws. Furthermore, some laws may be passed during a legislative session that is not intended to apply to the general population, e.g. a successful appropriation bill or a private act. Such laws might never be added to the statutes of the jurisdiction, and might only be contained in the session laws.

== See also ==
- Slip law
