= Illinois General Assembly =

Bicameral legislature of Illinois

Type
- Type: Bicameral
- Houses: Senate; House of Representatives

Leadership
- Senate President: Don Harmon (D) since January 19, 2020
- House Speaker: Chris Welch (D) since January 13, 2021

Structure
- Seats: 177 voting members: 59 senators; 118 representatives
- State Senate political groups: Democratic (40); Republican (19)
- House of Representatives political groups: Democratic (78); Republican (40)

Elections
- Last general election: November 3, 2026
- Next general election: November 7, 2028

Meeting place
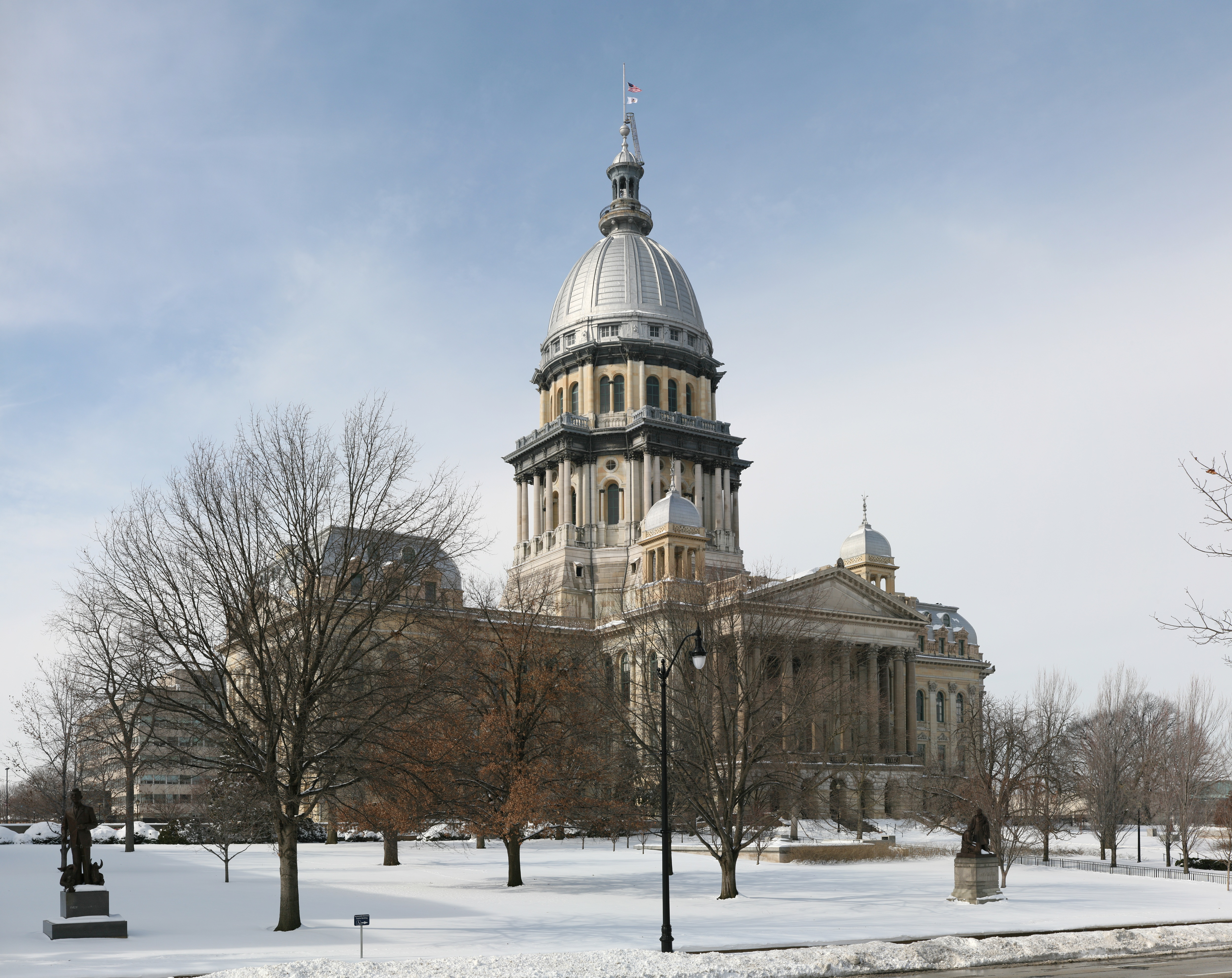
- Illinois State Capitol; Springfield

Website
- ilga.gov

Constitution
- Constitution of Illinois

The Illinois General Assembly is the legislature of the U.S. state of Illinois. It has two chambers, the Illinois House of Representatives and the Illinois Senate. The General Assembly was created by the first state constitution adopted in 1818. As of November 2026, the General Assembly is the 104th. The term of an assembly lasts two years.

Under the Illinois Constitution, since 1983 the Senate has had 59 members and the House has had 118 members. In both chambers, all members are elected from single-member districts and districts are drawn to represent generally equal populations and redrawn every ten years based on census returns. Each Senate district is divided into two adjacent House districts.

The General Assembly meets in the Illinois State Capitol in Springfield. Its session laws are generally adopted by majority vote in both houses, and upon gaining the assent of the Governor of Illinois. They are published in the official Laws of Illinois.

Two presidents of the United States, Abraham Lincoln and Barack Obama, began their political careers in the Illinois General Assembly, in the Illinois House of Representatives and Illinois Senate, respectively.

== History ==
The Illinois General Assembly was created by the first state constitution adopted in 1818. Initially, the state did not have organized political parties, but the Democratic and Whig parties began to form in the 1830s.

Future U.S. President Abraham Lincoln successfully campaigned as a member of the Whig Party to serve in the General Assembly in 1834. He served four successive terms 1834–1842 in the Illinois House of Representatives, supporting expanded suffrage and economic development. He later went to the presidency as part of then new Republican Party.

In 1877, John W. E. Thomas was the first African American elected to the legislature. In 1922, Lottie Holman O'Neill was elected to the Illinois House of Representatives, becoming the first woman to serve in the Illinois General Assembly.

Future U.S. President Barack Obama was elected to the Illinois Senate in 1996, serving there until 2004 when he was elected to the United States Senate.

=== Size over time ===
The size of the General Assembly has changed over time. The first General Assembly, elected in 1818, consisted of 14 senators and 28 representatives. Under the 1818 and 1848 Illinois Constitutions, the legislature could add and reapportion districts at any time, and by 1870 it had done so ten times. Under the 1870 Illinois Constitution, Illinois was divided into 51 legislative districts, each of which elected one senator and three representatives. The representatives were elected by cumulative voting, in which each voter had three votes that could be distributed among one, two, or three candidates. Due to the unwillingness of downstate Illinois to cede power to the growing Chicago area, the district boundaries were not redrawn from 1901 to 1955.

After voters approved the Legislative Apportionment Amendment in 1954, there were 58 Senate districts and 59 House districts, which did not necessarily coincide. This new arrangement was conceived as a "little federal" system: the Senate districts would be based on land area and would favor downstate, while the House districts would be based on population. House members continued to be elected by cumulative voting, three from each House district. With the adoption of the 1970 Illinois Constitution, the system of separate House and Senate districts was eliminated, and legislative districts were apportioned on a one person, one vote basis. The state was divided into 59 legislative districts, each of which elected one senator and three representatives.

The cumulative voting system was abolished by the Cutback Amendment in 1980. Since then, the House has been elected from 118 single-member districts, which are formed by dividing each of the 59 Senate districts in half. Each senator is "associated" with two representatives.

== Terms of members ==
Members of the House of Representatives are elected to a two-year term without term limits.

Members of the Illinois Senate serve two four-year terms and one two-year term each decade. This ensures that Senate elections reflect changes made when the General Assembly is redistricted following each United States Census. To prevent complete turnovers in membership (except after an intervening Census), not all Senators are elected simultaneously. The term cycles for the Senate are staggered, with the placement of the two-year term varying from one district to another. Each district's terms are defined as 2-4-4, 4-2-4, or 4-4-2. Like House members, Senators are elected without term limits.

== Officers ==
The officers of the General Assembly are elected at the beginning of each even-numbered year. Representatives of the House elect from its membership a Speaker and Speaker pro tempore, drawn from the majority party in the chamber. The Illinois Secretary of State convenes and supervises the opening House session and leadership vote. State senators elect from the chamber a President of the Senate, convened and under the supervision of the governor. Since the adoption of the current Illinois Constitution in 1970, the Lieutenant Governor of Illinois does not serve in any legislative capacity as Senate President, and has had its office's powers transferred to other capacities. The Illinois Auditor General is a legislative officer appointed by the General Assembly that reviews all state spending for legality.

== Sessions and qualifications ==
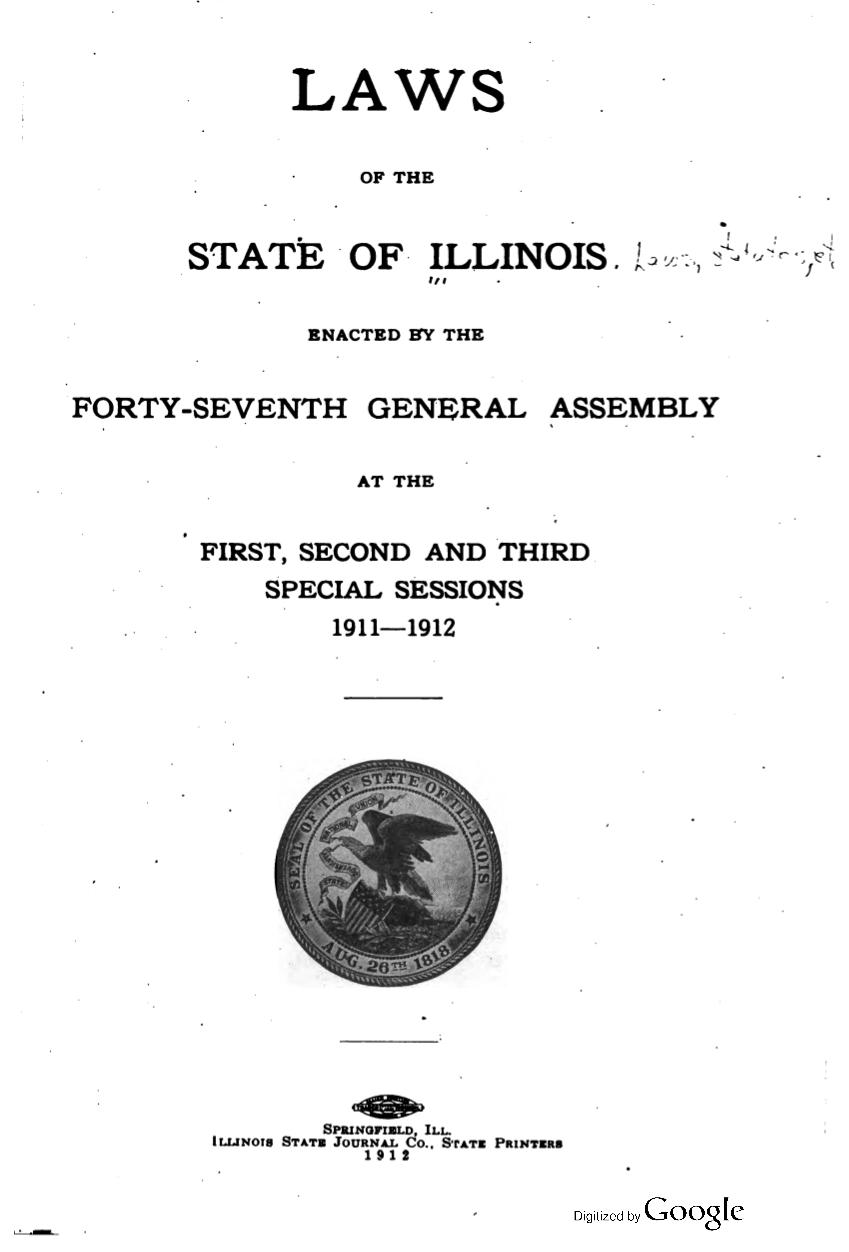
Title page of the 1912 Laws of Illinois

The General Assembly's first official working day is the second Wednesday of January each year. The Secretary of State presides over the House until it chooses a Speaker and the governor presides over the Senate until it chooses a President. Both chambers must also select a Minority Leader from among the members of the second most numerous party.

In order to serve as a member in either chamber of the General Assembly, a person must be a U.S. citizen, at least 21 years of age, and for the two years preceding their election or appointment a resident of the district which they represent. In the general election following a redistricting, a candidate for any chamber of the General Assembly may be elected from any district which contains a part of the district in which they resided at the time of the redistricting and reelected if a resident of the new district they represents for 18 months prior to reelection.

=== Restrictions ===
Members of the General Assembly may not hold other public offices or receive appointments by the governor, and their salaries may not be increased during their tenure.

== Vacancies ==
Seats in the General Assembly may become vacant due to a member resigning, dying, being expelled, or being appointed to another office. Under the Illinois Constitution, when a vacancy occurs, it must be filled by appointment within 30 days. If a Senate seat becomes vacant more than 28 months before the next general election for that seat, an election is held at the next general election. The replacement member must be a member of the same party as the departing member. The General Assembly has enacted a statute governing this process. Under that statute, a replacement member is appointed by the party committee for that district, whose votes are weighted by the number of votes cast for that office in the area that each committee member represents.

The appointment process was unsuccessfully challenged before the Illinois Supreme Court in 1988 as an unconstitutional grant of state power to political parties, but the challenge failed.

== Vetoes ==
The governor can veto bills passed by the General Assembly in four different ways: a full veto, an amendatory veto, and, for appropriations only, an item veto and a reduction veto. These veto powers are unusually broad among US state governors. The line item veto was added to the Illinois Constitution in 1884. The amendatory and reduction vetoes were new additions in the 1970 Constitution.

The General Assembly can override full, amendatory and item vetoes by a three-fifths majority vote in both chambers. It can override a reduction veto by a simple majority vote in both chambers. If both chambers agree to the changes the governor suggests in an amendatory veto, these changes can be approved by a simple majority vote in both chambers. If the General Assembly approves an amended law in response to the governor's changes, the bill becomes law once the governor certifies that the suggested changes have been made.

== Joint Committee on Administrative Rules ==
By statute, the General Assembly has the power to block regulations, including emergency regulations, proposed by state administrative agencies. This power is currently exercised by the Joint Committee on Administrative Rules (JCAR). JCAR is made up of 12 members, with equal numbers from the House and Senate and equal numbers from each political party. It can block proposed rules by a 3/5 vote. The General Assembly can then reverse the block by a joint resolution of both houses.

JCAR was first established in 1978 and given only advisory powers. The General assembly gave it the power to temporarily block or suspend administrative regulations for 180 days in 1980. In September 2004, the General Assembly expanded this temporary suspension power into a permanent veto. As the Illinois Constitution does not provide for a legislative veto, the constitutionality of this arrangement has been questioned. Among the charges brought against Governor Rod Blagojevich in his 2009 impeachment trial was that he had not respected the legitimacy of JCAR blocking his rulemaking on healthcare in 2008.

== See also ==
- Government of Illinois
- Law of Illinois
- List of Illinois state legislatures

== Works cited ==
- Illinois Constitution of 1818
- Illinois Constitution of 1870
- Illinois Constitution of 1970
- Green, Paul M. (1987). "Legislative Redistricting in Illinois: An Historical Analysis" (PDF). Illinois Commission on Intergovernmental Cooperation.
- Miller, David R. (2005). 1970 Illinois Constitution Annotated for Legislators (PDF) (4th ed.). Illinois Legislative Reference Unit.
