= Illinois circuit courts =

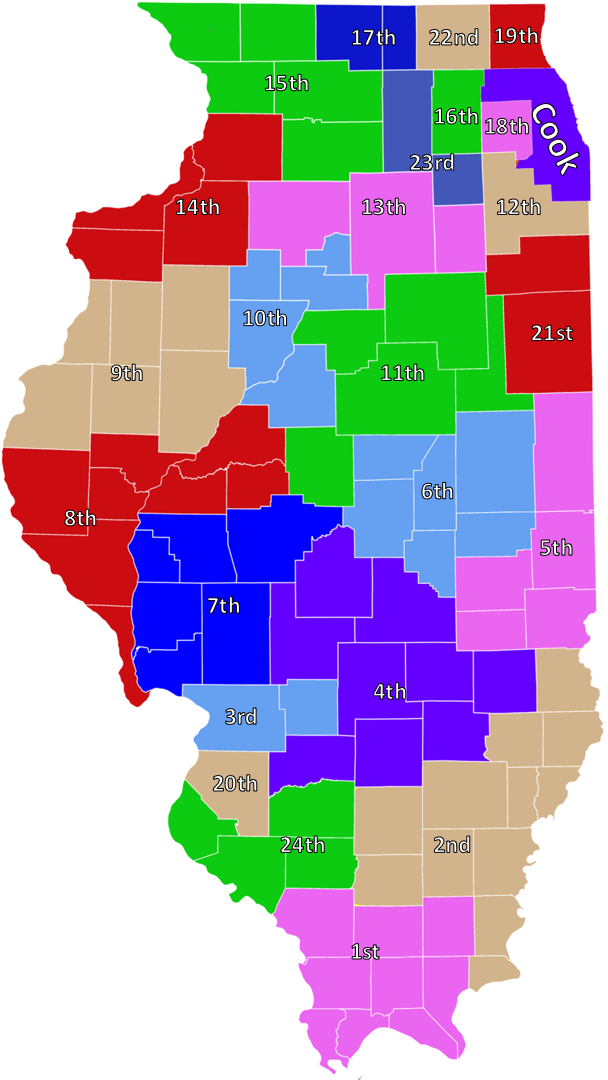
A map of Illinois breaking out its twenty-five total judicial circuits as of December 5, 2022.

The Illinois circuit courts are state courts of the judiciary of Illinois. They are trial courts of original and general jurisdiction. Cook County has its own circuit court, whereas the other 24 circuits may include one or more counties of Illinois—the numbering of the circuits is based on when they were created, with higher numbers going to circuits that were later created from the lower numbered circuit courts.

== History ==
The Illinois legislature originally created nine circuits in 1839.

In the 19th century, one of the most important circuits was the Eighth, which at its largest encompassed 15 counties including Abraham Lincoln's home county, Sangamon (now in the Seventh Circuit). It was where Lincoln launched the political career which culminated in his election as President of the United States.

In 1962, the voters of Illinois passed a constitutional amendment that moved the functions of justice of the peace courts, police magistrate courts, city, village and incorporated town courts, municipal courts, county courts, probate courts, the Superior Court of Cook County, Criminal Court of Cook County, and the Municipal Court of Cook County and transferred them to circuit courts which have "original jurisdiction of all justiciable matters." This structure was carried over largely unchanged to the Illinois Constitution of 1970.

== Judges ==
There are two kinds of judges in the circuit court: circuit judges and associate judges. Circuit judges are elected for six years, may be retained by voters for additional six-year terms, and can hear any kind of case. Circuit judges are elected on a circuit-wide, or "at-large", basis or from the county or sub-circuit where they reside, depending on how the particular seat was created. The Illinois State Constitution provides that each county have at least one circuit judge elected from that county's residents. Additional "resident" circuit judges may exist pursuant to a constitutional provision or legislative act. Associate judges are appointed by the circuit judges of a circuit pursuant to Supreme Court rule to serve four-year terms. Associate judges may be reappointed by the circuit judges for additional four-year terms. The terms of all associate judges throughout the state run concurrently; I.e., they all expire on the same date regardless of when an associate judge is appointed. An associate judge can hear any case, except criminal cases punishable by a prison term of one year or more, unless the associate judge has received approval from the Chief Judge of the respective circuit court to hear other criminal cases. Circuit judges in a circuit elect one of their members to serve as chief judge of the circuit court. Judges of the court may be assigned to general or specialized divisions by the chief judge, who has general administrative authority in the circuit, subject to the overall administrative authority of the Supreme Court.

== Jurisdiction ==
The circuit court has general jurisdiction and can decide, with few exceptions, any kind of case. The exceptions are redistricting of the Illinois General Assembly and the ability of the governor of Illinois to serve or resume office. The circuit court also shares jurisdiction with the Supreme Court of Illinois to hear cases relating to revenue, mandamus, prohibition, and habeas corpus. However, if the Supreme Court chooses to exercise its jurisdiction over these cases, the circuit court may not decide them. The circuit court also reviews administrative decisions of certain state agencies. Circuit courts may also have concurrent jurisdiction with federal courts, subject to removal jurisdiction.

== Circuits ==
There are 25 judicial circuits in the state, each comprising one or more of Illinois' 102 counties. The jurisdiction of seven of these circuit courts are solely within the confines of a single county; these are Cook, Kane, Will, DuPage, Lake, McHenry (all Chicago metropolitan area counties), and St. Clair in Metro East. The other 18 circuits each contain between two and 12 counties.

=== Circuit Court of Cook County ===
The Circuit Court of Cook County is not a numbered circuit. The Judicial Circuits Districting Act of 2022 increased the number of subcircuits from 15 to 20 subcircuits starting December 2, 2024.

=== First Circuit ===
The First Circuit consists of the counties of Alexander, Pulaski, Massac, Pope, Johnson, Union, Jackson, Williamson, and Saline.

=== Second Circuit ===
The Second Circuit consists of the counties of Hardin, Gallatin, White, Hamilton, Franklin, Wabash, Edwards, Wayne, Jefferson, Richland, Lawrence, and Crawford.

=== Third Circuit ===
The Third Circuit consists of the counties of Madison and Bond. Under the Judicial Circuits Districting Act of 2022, the third circuit is to receive four subcircuits (three in Madison County, one in Bond County).

=== Fourth Circuit ===
The Fourth Circuit consists of the counties of Clinton, Marion, Clay, Fayette, Effingham, Jasper, Montgomery, Shelby, and Christian.

=== Fifth Circuit ===
The Fifth Circuit consists of the counties of Vermilion, Edgar, Clark, Cumberland, and Coles.

=== Sixth Circuit ===
The Sixth Circuit consists of the counties of Champaign, Douglas, Moultrie, Macon, DeWitt, and Piatt.

=== Seventh Circuit ===
The Seventh Circuit consists of the counties of Sangamon, Macoupin, Morgan, Scott, Greene, and Jersey. Under the Judicial Circuits Districting Act of 2022, the seventh circuit is to receive seven subcircuits (two in Sangamon County, one in each of the remaining counties).

=== Eighth Circuit ===
The Eighth Circuit consists of the counties of Adams, Schuyler, Mason, Cass, Brown, Pike, Calhoun, and Menard.

=== Ninth Circuit ===
The Ninth Circuit consists of the counties of Knox, Warren, Henderson, Hancock, McDonough, and Fulton.

=== Tenth Circuit ===
The Tenth Circuit consists of the counties of Peoria, Marshall, Putnam, Stark, and Tazewell.

=== Eleventh Circuit ===
The Eleventh Circuit consists of the counties of McLean, Livingston, Logan, Ford, and Woodford.

=== Twelfth Circuit ===
The Twelfth Circuit consists of Will County. Under the Judicial Circuits Districting Act of 2022, the twelfth circuit is to receive five subcircuits.

=== Thirteenth Circuit ===
The Thirteenth Circuit consists of the counties of Bureau, LaSalle, and Grundy.

=== Fourteenth Circuit ===
The Fourteenth Circuit consists of the counties of Rock Island, Mercer, Whiteside, and Henry.

=== Fifteenth Circuit ===
The Fifteenth Circuit consists of the counties of Jo Daviess, Stephenson, Carroll, Ogle, and Lee.

=== Sixteenth Circuit ===
The Sixteenth Circuit consists of Kane County.

=== Seventeenth Circuit ===
The Seventeenth Circuit consists of the counties of Winnebago and Boone. The number of subcircuits will decrease from four to two effective December 2, 2024.

=== Eighteenth Circuit ===
The Eighteenth Circuit consists of DuPage County. The circuit is further divided into seven subcircuits.

=== Nineteenth Circuit ===
The Nineteenth Circuit consists of Lake County. Under the Judicial Circuits Districting Act of 2022, the number of subcircuits in the Nineteenth Circuit is to increase from 6 to 12 subcircuits.

=== Twentieth Circuit ===
As of December 5, 2022, the twentieth circuit consists solely of St. Clair County. Prior to December 5, 2022, it had also included the counties of Randolph, Monroe, Washington, and Perry.

=== Twenty-first Circuit ===
The Twenty-first Circuit consists of the counties of Iroquois and Kankakee.

=== Twenty-second Circuit ===
The Twenty-second Circuit consists of McHenry County. The circuit was created when McHenry County was separated from the Nineteenth Circuit into its own circuit and is divided into four subcircuits. It came into effect December 4, 2006.

=== Twenty-third Circuit ===
The Twenty-third Circuit consists of the counties of DeKalb and Kendall. The circuit was created after DeKalb County and Kendall County were split from the Sixteenth Circuit by Public Act 97-0585. The circuit came into effect on December 3, 2012.

=== Twenty-fourth Circuit ===
The twenty-fourth circuit came into effect on December 5, 2022. It consists of the counties of Randolph, Monroe, Washington, and Perry.

== See also ==
- Judiciary of Illinois
