= List of Illinois state agencies =

The Illinois state government has numerous departments, but the so-called code departments provide most of the state's services.

== Code departments ==
- Department on Aging
- Department of Agriculture
- Department of Central Management Services
- Department of Children and Family Services
- Department of Commerce and Economic Opportunity
- Department of Corrections
- Department of Employment Security
- Emergency Management Agency
- Department of Financial and Professional Regulation
- Department of Healthcare and Family Services
- Department of Human Rights
- Department of Human Services
- Department of Innovation and Technology
- Department of Insurance
- Department of Juvenile Justice
- Department of Labor
- State Lottery
- Department of Military Affairs
- Department of Natural Resources
- Department of Public Health
- Department of Revenue
- State Police
- Department of Transportation
- Department of Veterans' Affairs

== Boards, commissions and offices ==
There are also many boards, commissions and offices, including:

- Abraham Lincoln Presidential Library and Museum
- Attorney Registration & Disciplinary Commission of the Supreme Court of Illinois
- Illinois Arts Council
- Illinois State Board of Elections
- Illinois Board of Higher Education
- Illinois Budgeting for Results Commission
- Illinois Bureau of Criminal Investigations
- Capital Development Board
- Illinois Civil Service Commission
- Illinois Commerce Commission
- Illinois Commission on Government Forecasting and Accountability
- Illinois Commission on Volunteerism and Community Service
- Illinois Community and Residential Services Authority
- Illinois Community College Board
- Illinois Comprehensive Health Insurance Plan
- Illinois Council on Developmental Disabilities
- Illinois Criminal Justice Information Authority
- Illinois Deaf and Hard of Hearing Commission
- Illinois Educational Labor Relations Board
- Illinois Environmental Protection Agency
- Illinois Executive Ethics Commission
- Illinois Export Advisory Council
- Illinois Finance Authority
- Illinois Gaming Board
- Illinois General Assembly
- Illinois Guardianship and Advocacy Commission
- Illinois Health Information Exchange Authority
- Illinois Historic Preservation Agency
- Illinois House Democrats
- Illinois House Republicans
- Illinois Housing Development Authority
- Illinois Human Rights Commission
- Illinois Independent Tax Tribunal
- Illinois Judicial Inquiry Board
- Illinois Labor Relations Board
- Illinois Law Enforcement Training and Standards Board
- Illinois Liquor Control Commission
- Illinois Medical District Commission
- Illinois National Guard
- Illinois Office of Management and Budget
- Illinois Pollution Control Board
- Illinois Power Agency
- Illinois Prisoner Review Board
- Illinois Procurement Policy Board
- Illinois Property Tax Appeal Board
- Illinois Racing Board
- Illinois Senate Democrats
- Illinois Senate Republicans
- Illinois State Board of Education
- Illinois State Board of Investment
- Illinois State Fair
- Illinois State Police
- Illinois State Police Merit Board
- Illinois State Toll Highway Authority
- Illinois State Universities Civil Service System
- Illinois State Universities Retirement System
- Illinois Student Assistance Commission
- Illinois Workers' Compensation Commission
- Office of the Illinois Attorney General
- Office of the Illinois Auditor General
- Office of the Illinois Comptroller
- Office of the Illinois Governor
- Office of the Illinois Lieutenant Governor
- Office of the Illinois Secretary of State
- Office of the Illinois State Appellate Defender
- Office of the Illinois State Fire Marshal
- Office of the Illinois State Treasurer
- Office of the Illinois State's Attorneys Appellate Prosecutor
- State Retirement Systems of Illinois
- Teachers' Retirement System of the State of Illinois
