= Dan Cronin =

Illinois politician

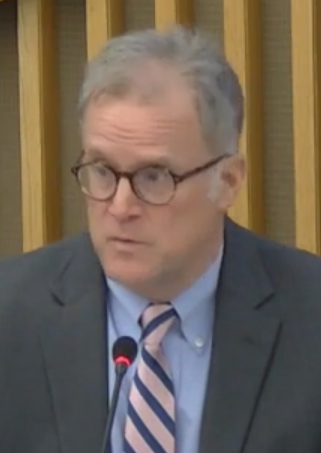

Chair of the DuPage County Board
- In office December 2010 – December 5, 2022
- Preceded by: Bob Schillerstrom
- Succeeded by: Deb Conroy

Member of the Illinois Senate from the 21st district 39th district (1993–2003)
- In office January 1993 – November 2010
- Preceded by: Redistricted
- Succeeded by: Ronald Sandack

Member of the Illinois House of Representatives from the 40th district
- In office January 1991 – January 1993
- Preceded by: Gene L. Hoffman
- Succeeded by: Redistricted

Personal details
- Born: November 7, 1959 (age 66) Elmhurst, Illinois, U.S.
- Party: Republican
- Spouse: Juliann Cronin
- Children: 4
- Education: Northwestern University (BA); Loyola University Chicago (JD)

Daniel J. Cronin (born November 7, 1959) is an American politician and attorney who served as county board chairman of DuPage County, Illinois from December 2010 until December 2022. A member of the Republican Party, he previously served in the Illinois General Assembly from 1991 through 2010.

Cronin was born in Elmhurst, Illinois. He received a bachelor's degree from Northwestern University and later graduated from the Loyola University Chicago School of Law. Cronin spent his early legal career as counsel for the Illinois House of Representatives from 1985 to 1987, then as a prosecutor in DuPage County from 1987 to 1989. Since 1991, he has worked in private practice. He comes from a family that has been politically prominent in DuPage. His father, a sports physician who ran his practice and owned a medical office building in Elmhurst, helped with Dan's campaigns. Dan's brother, an attorney, managed campaigns for Republican candidates at the state and county levels in 1994, then ran unsuccessfully for DuPage state's attorney during the 1996 elections. His sister, an accountant, previously served as city treasurer of Elmhurst and later as a member of the Illinois Liquor Control Commission; she was elected to the DuPage County Board in 2022.

Cronin was elected to the House of Representatives in 1990, after defeating Republican incumbent Gene L. Hoffman on an anti-tax and anti-abortion platform. He supported cutbacks to taxes and government spending, and earned a reputation as a conservative Republican. He then ran for the Senate during the 1992 elections. Recent redistricting pitted Cronin against Ted Leverenz, an incumbent Democratic senator, in what was considered one of the "liveliest and most bitter contests" of the election season. Cronin won the election. He became chairman of the Senate's education committee, where he sponsored or debated several bills concerning reforms of Chicago Public Schools. He also sponsored legislation that restricted Medicaid funding for abortions, but the bill was vetoed by Governor George Ryan.

After becoming chairman of the DuPage County Board in 2010, Cronin launched initiatives to consolidate units of local government in the county. His reforms included merging the county's election commission into the county clerk's office in 2019, with the approval of voters during a non-binding countywide referendum. Cronin was re-elected to a second term in 2014. His accomplishments included reducing the county's sales tax by 0.25 percentage points. While running for his third term in 2018, he faced a strong challenge from Democratic candidate Lynn LaPlante, and narrowly won re-election. Following the 2018 elections, DuPage was no longer a Republican stronghold, and Cronin lamented increased political infighting on the board. In 2020, Democrats won a majority of the seats on the board for the first time since the 1930s. He submitted budgets for fiscal years 2022 and 2023 – his last as chairman – which kept property tax rates unchanged and took advantage of surpluses from rising sales tax revenues. Cronin decided not to run for re-election at the end of his term in 2022; he was succeeded by Democratic state representative Deb Conroy.

== Early life and legal career ==
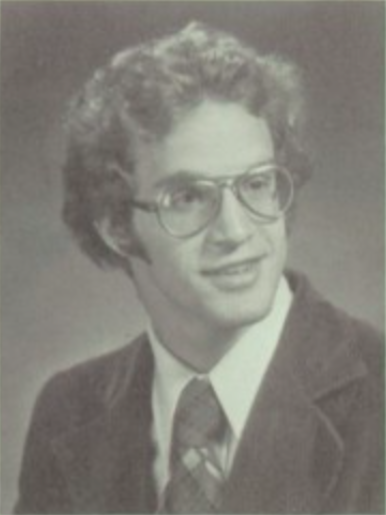
Cronin in 1977

Cronin was born on November 7, 1959, in Elmhurst, Illinois. His parents, Richard Cronin and Claire Cronin (née Cusack), had nine children: five sons and four daughters. The family lived across the street from York Community High School. Cronin graduated from Immaculate Conception Grade School and Fenwick High School. Cronin earned a bachelor of arts degree from Northwestern University and a Juris Doctor degree from the Loyola University Chicago School of Law. From 1985 to 1987, he served as legal counsel to Lee A. Daniels, minority leader of the Illinois House of Representatives, where Cronin helped oversee the movement of legislation presented on the House floor.

From 1987 through 1989, Cronin worked as a prosecutor in DuPage County, serving under Jim Ryan, the county state's attorney. He worked alongside Joe Birkett, who would eventually become state's attorney in 1996 and Appellate Court judge in 2010. In 1991, he began to practice law at Cronin & Ruggiero, where he specialized in criminal law, family law, and real estate. He was also associated with Kemp & Capanna Ltd. In 1993, he transferred to Power & Cronin, based in Oak Brook. He eventually became a senior partner at that law firm.

== Family ==
Dan is married to Juliann Ashley Cronin, owner of A&H Lithoprint, a lithography company in Broadview. Juliann is also a part-time yoga instructor. The couple became engaged in October 1991 and married in May 1992. They have three daughters and one son, and they are members of Immaculate Conception Parish in Elmhurst.

Cronin is part of a large, Irish American, Catholic, Republican political family. Most of the family lives in DuPage, several in Elmhurst. Around 50 family members and friends attended his inauguration to the House of Representatives in 1991. After Dan was elected to the Senate in 1992, the Cronin family was called the "Kennedys of DuPage" or "Kennedys of Elmhurst", not necessarily a compliment in the Republican-dominated county. The family was seen as politically ambitious, potentially prompting animosity and wariness from incumbents and insiders.

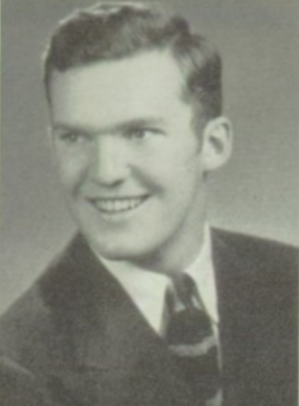
Richard Cronin, Dan's father, in 1944

Dan's father, Richard Cronin, was born in Oak Park. Richard played football while attending Fenwick High School and the University of Notre Dame, where he graduated in 1946. He earned a Doctor of Medicine degree in 1950 at the Stritch School of Medicine, part of Loyola University Chicago, and completed his residency at the University of Illinois Hospital & Health Sciences System. He and Claire Cusack married in 1952. Richard enlisted in the Air Force in 1954 and served as an orthopedic surgery resident for two years at Chanute Air Force Base in Rantoul. He then opened a medical practice in Chicago's west suburbs, and in 1960 the family moved from River Forest to Elmhurst. Within the next few years, he organized a group of around ten doctors who purchased land to construct a medical office building at Palmer Drive and Kenilworth Avenue in Elmhurst. He specialized in sports medicine, and was crucial to the recovery of John Huarte, who suffered an injury in 1964 while playing football at Notre Dame and later went on to play for the National Football League. In 1986, Richard acquired full ownership of his office building after buying out the other partners. Richard was also a clinical medical professor at Loyola, and served as the vice chair and program director of the school's department of orthopedics. He retired from practicing medicine in the 1990s, but continued to manage the office building. He subsequently helped Dan with his senate and county board campaigns. Richard died in 2016, aged 89.

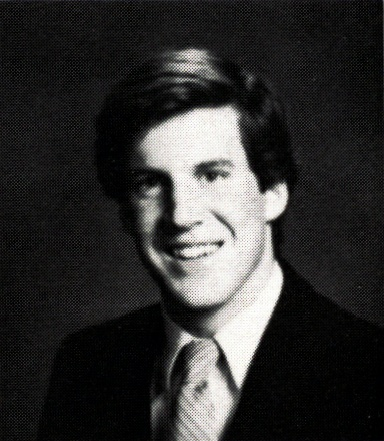
Tom Cronin, Dan's brother, in 1982

Tom Cronin, Dan's younger brother by four years, was interested in politics as early as when he attended York Community High School. He and Dan worked at the Elmhurst office of Daniels, their state representative. Tom pursued undergraduate studies in political philosophy at Harvard University, and continued to work for Daniels during summer breaks. He then received a Juris Doctor and a Master of Business Administration at the University of Chicago. From 1990 to 1992, he clerked for William J. Bauer, chief judge of the US Court of Appeals for the Seventh Circuit and former state's attorney of DuPage. Tom then worked as an attorney at Winston & Strawn starting in the fall of 1992. He took a leave of absence to work on campaigning during the 1994 elections, managing Ryan's successful campaign for attorney general and Gayle Franzen's campaign for DuPage County board chairman. He earned $3,400 per month while serving as campaign manager for Franzen, who had turned to Tom and Dan for help in asserting Franzen's independence from party leadership. Tom's and Dan's mother, Claire Cronin, and two sisters also volunteered for Franzen's campaign.

Tom had political ambitions of his own. In 1994, he expressed interest in running for the US Congress if Representative Henry Hyde, whose district included northeastern DuPage, were to retire. (Hyde did not retire until 2007, and Tom did not run to replace him.) Tom ran for DuPage state's attorney in 1996 against Birkett, who by then had worked in the state's attorney's office for 14 years and was endorsed by DuPage Republican leaders. Tom positioned himself as the outsider candidate, despite having managed the campaigns of Ryan and Franzen. At a forum between the two candidates, Dan asked a question attacking Birkett for accepting campaign contributions from criminal defense attorneys. During the campaign, Dan also protested language in sample letters circulated among Republican precinct workers that endorsed Birkett and criticized Tom. Additionally, Tom faced criticisms for receiving traffic tickets and failing to appear in court to answer them, causing his drivers license to be suspended. Tom lost to Birkett.

Dan's and Tom's sister, Cindy Cronin Cahill, was the first in the family to enter politics. A part-time accountant with her own company, Cahill ran for city treasurer of Elmhurst in 1989. The Cronin family helped with canvassing, including Juliann, who had not yet married Dan. Cahill was the youngest candidate in the race, and defeated her two male opponents by a wide margin. After four years, she stepped down as treasurer in 1993 to care for her children. Cahill later served as a member of the Illinois Liquor Control Commission from 2012 through 2019. She was elected to the county board during the 2022 elections.

== Illinois House of Representatives ==
Cronin considered running for the General Assembly in 1986 and 1988. Daniels, by then the House minority leader, advised him to wait both times. Cronin declined to wait at the 1990 elections, when he ran for the 40th district of the House of Representatives. During the Republican primary, he defeated incumbent Gene L. Hoffman, who had been in the legislature for 24 years and was the longest-serving Republican in the House. Financing for the campaign came primarily from Dan's father, Richard Cronin. The campaign was managed by Tom Cronin, Dan's brother, and also Tom Manion, a political operative from Elmhurst who previously directed field operations for the campaigns of Chicago Mayor Richard M. Daley and US representative Dan Rostenkowski. Pam McDonough, chief of staff for Daniels, regarded Cronin as a "good campaigner".

Cronin touted an anti-tax platform, which appealed to voters, especially the conservative wing of the Republican Party. He portrayed Hoffman as being aligned with special interests. Cronin also criticized his opponent for supporting a temporary increase to state income taxes to fund education, suggesting that Hoffman was more interested in his dream job of becoming Illinois State Superintendent. Cronin, an anti-abortion candidate, contrasted himself from Hoffman's support for abortion rights. He positioned his campaign as a change from the incumbents, and he pledged to make government more responsive and accessible to the public.

A few weeks before the primary in March, Cronin's campaign claimed that roughly 150 yard signs were removed from properties along major roadways in Elmhurst. Supporters speculated that Hoffman's backers had removed the signs ahead of the arrival of Governor James R. Thompson, who was visiting Elmhurst to endorse Hoffman. Cronin's anti-establishment positions, though they helped him win the primary, did not endear him to the party's leadership. He referred to Daniels, a Hoffman supporter, as "ineffective", and the relationship between Cronin and Daniels became strained. By the general election, Cronin would eventually ease the criticism and work with Daniels again. Tom and Dan Cronin worked afterwards to further improve their relationship with Daniels.

In the general election, Cronin faced Democratic nominee Truman Kirkpatrick, a retired chemist from York Center. Cronin estimated that his campaign debt could reach $60,000–70,000, of which $25,000 was a personal loan, compared to Kirkpatrick's much more modest campaign. He urged an audit of the Illinois Department of Commerce and Community Affairs, and pledged to give the DuPage County auditor the authority to audit school districts and agencies of county government. Cronin supported amending the state constitution to provide for more referendums and to promote tax accountability. Kirkpatrick, an abortion rights advocate, believed 70% of voters in the district to be against Cronin's anti-abortion stance. Further, while Cronin supported requiring a supermajority in the General Assembly to increase taxes, Kirkpatrick countered that the scheme would make it easier for a simple majority of the legislature to spend without being able to back it up with revenue.

Cronin won the election and began his term in the House in January 1991. He credited his victory against Hoffman for attracting statewide attention to rising property taxes. He supported cutbacks to state programs and personnel, and sponsored legislation that capped property taxes in the suburban counties. However, he opposed property tax-capping legislation sponsored by Daniels and Senate Minority Leader James Philip, claiming the bill extended or made permanent a surcharge on the state's income tax.

As of October 1992, Cronin was the youngest member of the General Assembly. He earned a reputation as a conservative Republican. However, he supported paid family leave, opposed by Republican leadership and business constituents.

== Illinois Senate ==
=== Senate campaigns and political activity ===
In 1991, Republicans took control of the redistricting of the state's legislative districts, and drew maps that gave partisan advantage to Republican candidates, especially in the suburbs of Chicago. Under the new maps, suburban voters controlled more legislative districts than Chicago or Downstate voters for the first time, reflecting population shifts. For the upcoming elections in 1992, Cronin decided to run in the new 39th senate district, solidly Republican territory with two-thirds of the district in DuPage. Two suburban senate districts in Chicago were eliminated. Senator Ted Leverenz, a Democrat of Maywood, was forced into the 39th district, losing much of his base to another district.

The race between Cronin and Leverenz was considered one of the "liveliest and most bitter contests" of the election season. Democratic colleagues regarded Leverenz as a strong campaigner to help overcome his steep odds. He touted his lengthy career as a state legislator for more than 16 years, and his pro-suburban record. Cronin, already being mentioned by observers as a possible candidate for statewide office in the 1994 elections, cast the race as a choice between a suburban conservative and a "wheeler-dealer" with ties to Chicago. Manion, who managed Cronin's previous campaign for the House, likewise managed this campaign for the Senate. Cronin won, and he joined the Senate in 1993.

In the 1996 elections, Cronin was challenged in the Republican primary by attorney Nancy Miller, but he won re-election. He was seen as a potential candidate for attorney general in the 1998 elections as Ryan, the incumbent, considered running for the US Senate. (Ryan ultimately did not run for US Senate in 1998.)

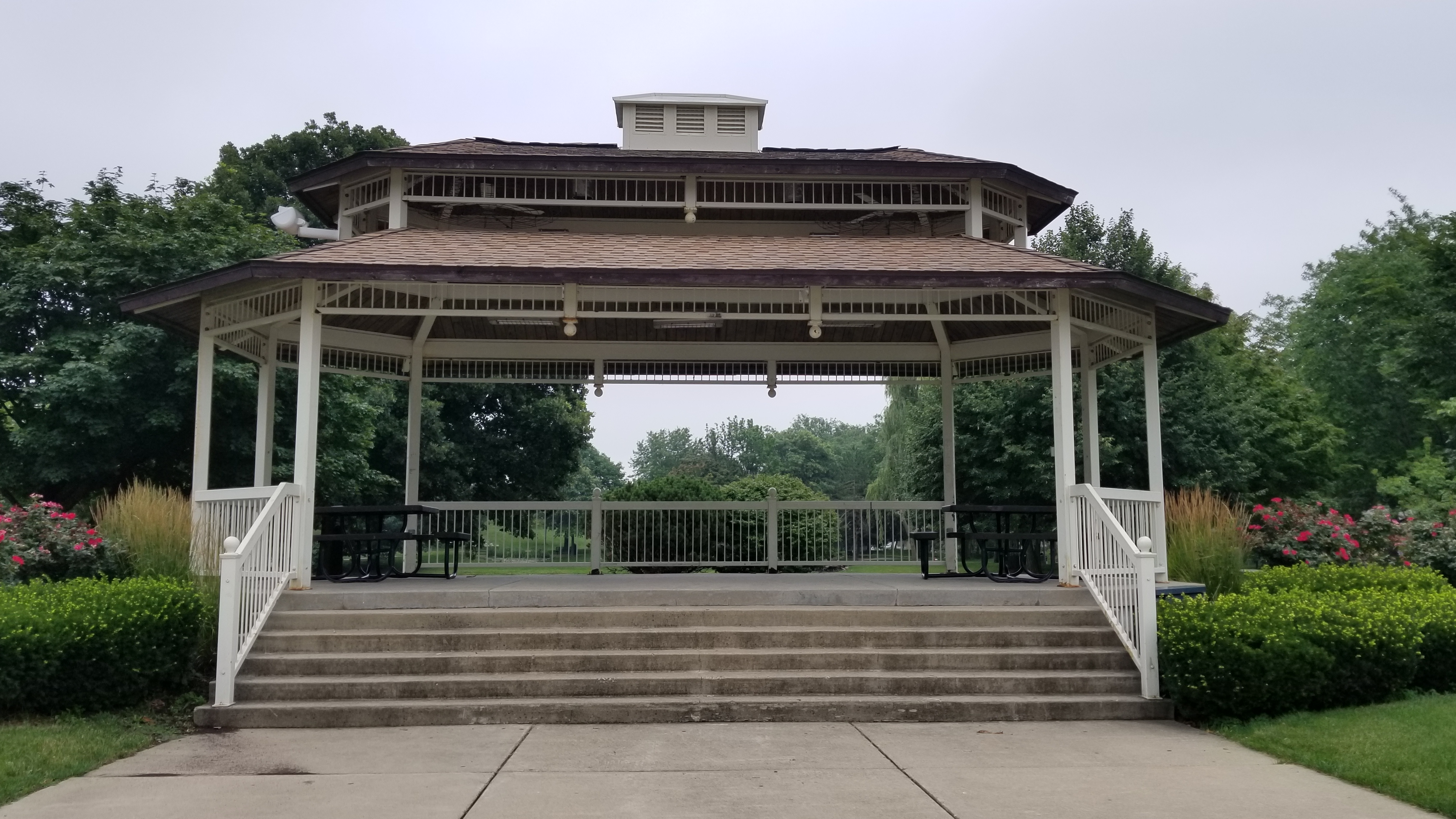
Cronin directed grant funding toward this gazebo in North Riverside.

The state's legislative districts were again redistricted in 2001. For the 2002 elections, Cronin ran for the newly-established 21st district. Tom Walsh, the Republican incumbent senator for the then-existing 22nd district, was forced to run in the same district against Cronin. In February, Cronin was criticized for committing $30,000 in pork barrel grant funding to a proposed gazebo in North Riverside, which was outside his present 39th district but inside the new 21st district he was running for. The gazebo had been backed by Illinois treasurer Judy Baar Topinka and North Riverside Mayor Richard Scheck. Cronin defended his actions by pointing to his record of supporting other projects outside his district. He won the election.

During the 2006 elections, Cronin endorsed Jeff Redick, a colleague at Cronin's law firm, during a successful run for a seat on the DuPage County Board. In April 2007, Cronin became the chairman of the DuPage County Republican Party, succeeding Senator Kirk Dillard. His priorities as party chair included filling all vacant precinct committeeman positions and conducting performance evaluations of incumbent committeemen. Cronin assumed this role at a time when Republican margins of victory in county races were getting slimmer. By then, Democrats had taken control over state government.

=== Senate career ===
In 1994, Cronin supported a bill backed by Governor Jim Edgar that would have banned assault weapons, though the measure faced strong opposition from Philip. He also sponsored a bill attempting to reverse the Illinois Supreme Court's decision in the Baby Richard case and keep children with their adoptive parents. The following year, he sponsored a bill that authorized winners of the Illinois Lottery to receive their winnings as lump-sum payments.

Cronin served as chair of the Senate's education committee and was regarded as a leading voice for Senate Republicans on education issues. In 1995, he sponsored a bill that gave the mayor of Chicago more control over the management of Chicago Public Schools (CPS). The following year, he backed a measure that would have required pay raises for teachers to be based on merit rather than seniority. In 1997, Cronin worked with several legislators to overhaul funding for public schools in Illinois, and supported Edgar's proposal to switch the burden from property taxes to income taxes. In 1998, he supported a proposal to provide direct financial relief to Catholic schools run by the Archdiocese of Chicago, amidst a broader push towards tax credits for private school tuition. In 1999, Cronin sponsored a bill that would have removed the power of Local School Councils to fire principals without the approval of central administration, but postponed further action on the bill after it became controversial. In 2002, he opposed an agreement between CPS and the Chicago Teachers Union that restored some of the bargaining rights that had been restricted under the 1995 law. In 2004, he opposed a deal in which Governor Rod Blagojevich earmarked $20 million towards the Gwendolyn Brooks College Preparatory Academy, a project backed by Senate President Emil Jones, in exchange for giving the governor more power over the Illinois State Board of Education. In 2007, Cronin proposed a bill that would have reviewed the role and authority of Local School Councils, but the legislation did not move forward.

In 2000, Cronin sponsored legislation that would have restricted Medicaid funding for abortions. The bill was vetoed by Governor George Ryan, a Republican who had long opposed abortion rights, prompting condemnation by Cronin and other social conservatives. In 2002, he sponsored a bill requiring the Illinois Department of Transportation to consult local communities and environmental groups on projects affecting highways.

Cronin sponsored a constitutional amendment to allow voters to recall elected officials, but the proposal was blocked by Senate Democrats. In 2008, he voted in favor of a pension reform bill that required the Chicago Transit Authority (CTA) to increase its pension contributions. In 2010, he co-sponsored legislation with Representative Randy Ramey that would reform DuPage County's water commission, an independent entity, by bringing it under the county's direct control. The proposal came after it was revealed that the commission had misspent around $69 million in reserve funds, with the financial administrator spending down some of those reserve funds without informing the water commission. A forensic audit revealed that missteps by the commission, the financial administrator, and the general manager caused several accounting errors that nearly depleted the reserves. The city council of Naperville joined the DuPage Mayors and Managers Conference in opposing the legislation, citing fears that the county would be taking control over municipal amenities.

Cronin stepped down from the Senate on November 30, 2010, after being elected to the county board. He was replaced by Ron Sandack.

== DuPage County board chairman ==
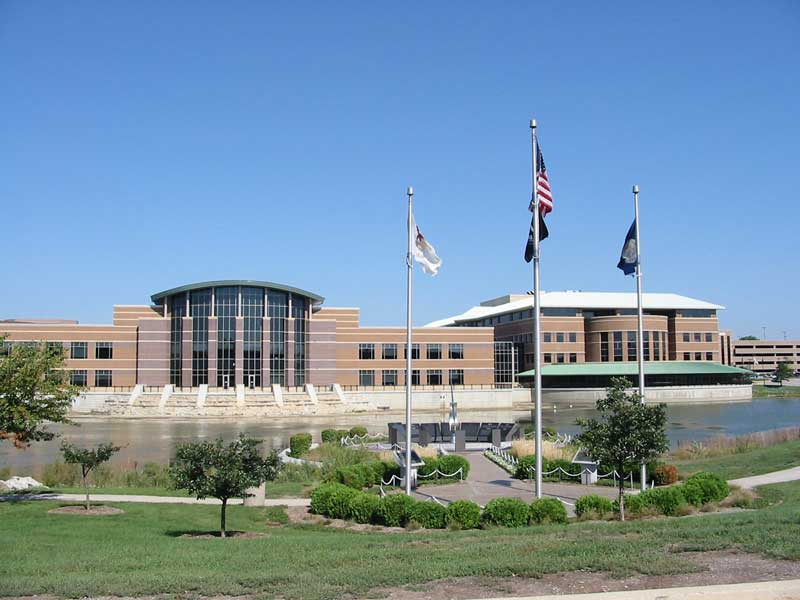
DuPage County government complex in Wheaton

=== Campaign ===
Cronin ran for chairman of the DuPage County Board during the 2010 elections. He announced his candidacy at a Westin hotel in Lombard; over 300 supporters attended the event. In the Republican primary, he faced Senator Carole Pankau, Burr Ridge Mayor Gary Grasso, and county board member Debra Olson. All four candidates touted their experience in government. Grasso differentiated himself from his opponents as the only candidate to have experience as an executive of a government. Pankau stated that she would be a full-time board chairman, unlike her opponents who have other jobs or business interests. Cronin won the primary, and faced Democratic candidate Carole Cheney, an attorney from Aurora. By then, countywide elections would depend more on support from independent voters. Cheney ran a positive campaign, though she labeled Cronin as a "career politician".

In September 2010, Cronin opposed the county board's decision to issue a large amount of bonds. At the time, Cronin's relationship with the county board was perceived to have been "icy" for a long time. Later that month, the board voted to take away several powers from the chairman, which Cronin saw as a reaction to the possibility of him winning the election. The board, seeking more checks and balances between the county executive and legislature, gave itself more oversight over the hiring of staff members, the ability to conduct decennial redistricting via a board committee, and the authority to determine its own committee assignments and appoint committee chairs.

Cronin subsequently won the general election after receiving nearly 63 percent of the vote.

=== First term ===
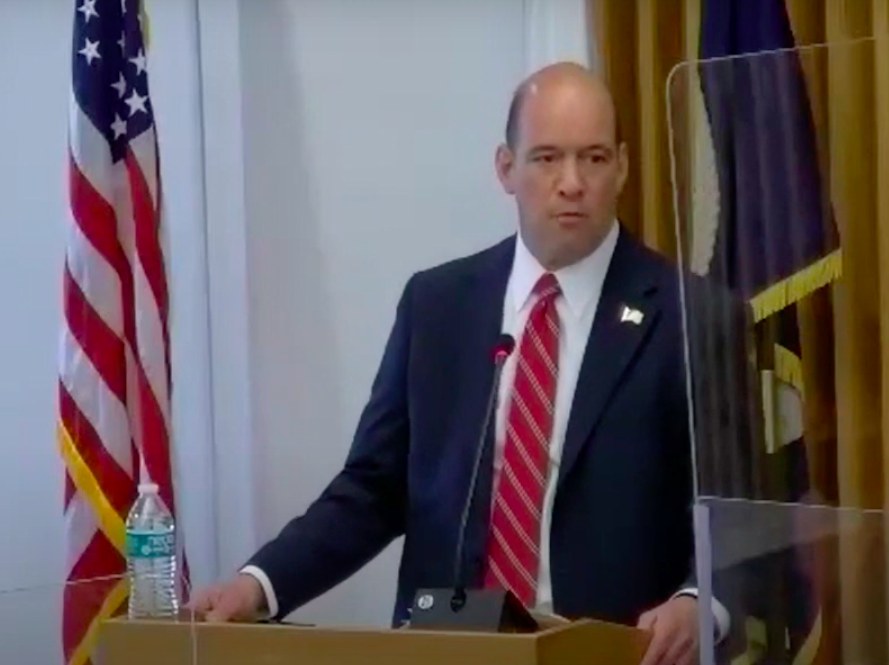
Bob Berlin, Cronin's appointee to fill the vacant county state's attorney position in 2010

Shortly after taking office, Cronin appointed Robert Berlin, a veteran prosecutor and chief of criminal prosecutions in the county, to succeed Birkett as DuPage state's attorney. The appointment was regarded as Cronin's "first major decision" as board chairman, due to the perceived high profile and powerful position of the state's attorney.

In January 2011, the DuPage County Board approved a $125,000 contract with a distinguished law firm based in Itasca to assist with redistricting the county's electoral boundaries. Cronin, who does not vote unless there is a tie, raised concerns regarding the contract's vague terms, including its open-ended nature and lack of clear responsibilities. He emphasized the importance of transparency and accountability in government contracts and successfully removed a confidentiality provision. However, the decision also faced scrutiny from Democratic board members, due to the firm's contributions of nearly $16,000 to the campaign funds of nine board members. Democratic members labeled it as "pay to play" politics, despite not offering an alternative firm for consideration. Other board members characterized the donations as minor and insisted that it did not influence their vote, emphasizing the firm's qualifications and expertise in redistricting. Observers of the issue noted that business contributions are a common, legal practice. The law firm stated they contribute to candidates they believe do the best for government and constituents, notably citing a $10,000 donation made to Democratic mayor Richard M. Daley in 2003, indicating its political contributions spanned across county lines. The law firm was also involved in redrawing legislative maps for both DuPage and the state of Illinois in the last redistricting a decade prior.

In April 2011, Cronin announced the formation of a committee aimed at aligning county employee benefits with those in the private sector, primarily to address rising pension costs. A key focus was on "pension spiking," where additional payouts for sick leave and vacation days are added to an employee's final salary for pension calculations. Cronin highlighted that the current system diverts funds from essential services like flood control and affordable housing. The committee also reviewed the controversial Elected County Officials (ECO) pension plan, which has allowed some part-time elected officials to receive substantial pensions, often exceeding $100,000 annually. This system was criticized for its lenient rules regarding salary calculations, allowing significant pay increases shortly before retirement to inflate pension benefits. Cronin described these pension arrangements as "outrageous" and unfair to taxpayers, especially those in the private sector facing economic uncertainty.

By August, DuPage County saw a significant increase in retirements, with over 100 county employees retired in 2011, compared to 25 the previous year. Cronin attributed this surge to recent changes in employment benefits, specifically the scaling back of time-off policies aimed at saving the county up to $28 million over two weeks. Effective that December, the changes eliminated large cash payouts for unused sick days and reduced vacation days for long-term employees. Board members emphasized that these reforms were necessary for long-term financial stability, as previous benefits were unsustainable. Finance officials estimated the policy changes could save the county between $8 million and $12 million over 20 years. Cronin believes that maintaining the old policy could have cost the county an additional $20 million in that timeframe. He also expressed support for ongoing pension reform discussions at the state level, acknowledging the financial pressures from pension benefits on government budgets.

In July 2011, Cronin stepped down as chairman of the DuPage County Republican Party, prompting the executive committee to unanimously select State Representative Randy Ramey as his successor. Cronin, who had led the county Republicans since taking over from State Senator Kirk Dillard nearly four years prior, cited his heavy workload as DuPage County Board chairman. A week prior, Governor Pat Quinn had tapped Cronin to head the Elgin-O’Hare West Bypass committee.

In June 2012, Elmhurst officials received a legal opinion stating they could prohibit local leaders from serving on more than one elected board if residents supported the measure in a referendum. This discussion followed Mayor Pete DiCianni’s announcement that he would resign as mayor if elected to the DuPage County Board in November, citing the distraction as a burden on the city. The issue of dual office-holding had been contentious, with DuPage County State’s Attorney Robert Berlin advising against it. While a state proposal allowing mayors to also serve on county boards did not advance, DuPage County Board Chairman Dan Cronin introduced a ballot question on the matter for the November 2012 elections. Cronin expressed concerns that dual office-holding prevented officials from adequately serving taxpayers.

According to an investigation published by the Better Government Association (BGA) in 2013, Cronin's administration signed contracts with four firms connected to state legislative leaders, including House Speaker Michael Madigan, Senate President John Cullerton, Senate President pro tempore Don Harmon, and House Minority Leader Tom Cross. The BGA speculated that these contracts were intended to bolster a potential run for higher office in the future, along with an aggressive legislative agenda that supported Cronin's efforts to consolidate governmental agencies in DuPage.

In April 2014, Cronin claimed that labor and pension costs of the CTA were a "drag" on the entire Regional Transportation Authority. He also lamented that CTA was getting a greater share of discretionary funds compared to the region's other transit agencies, including Metra, echoing concerns that he had previously raised in 2012.

=== Government consolidation ===
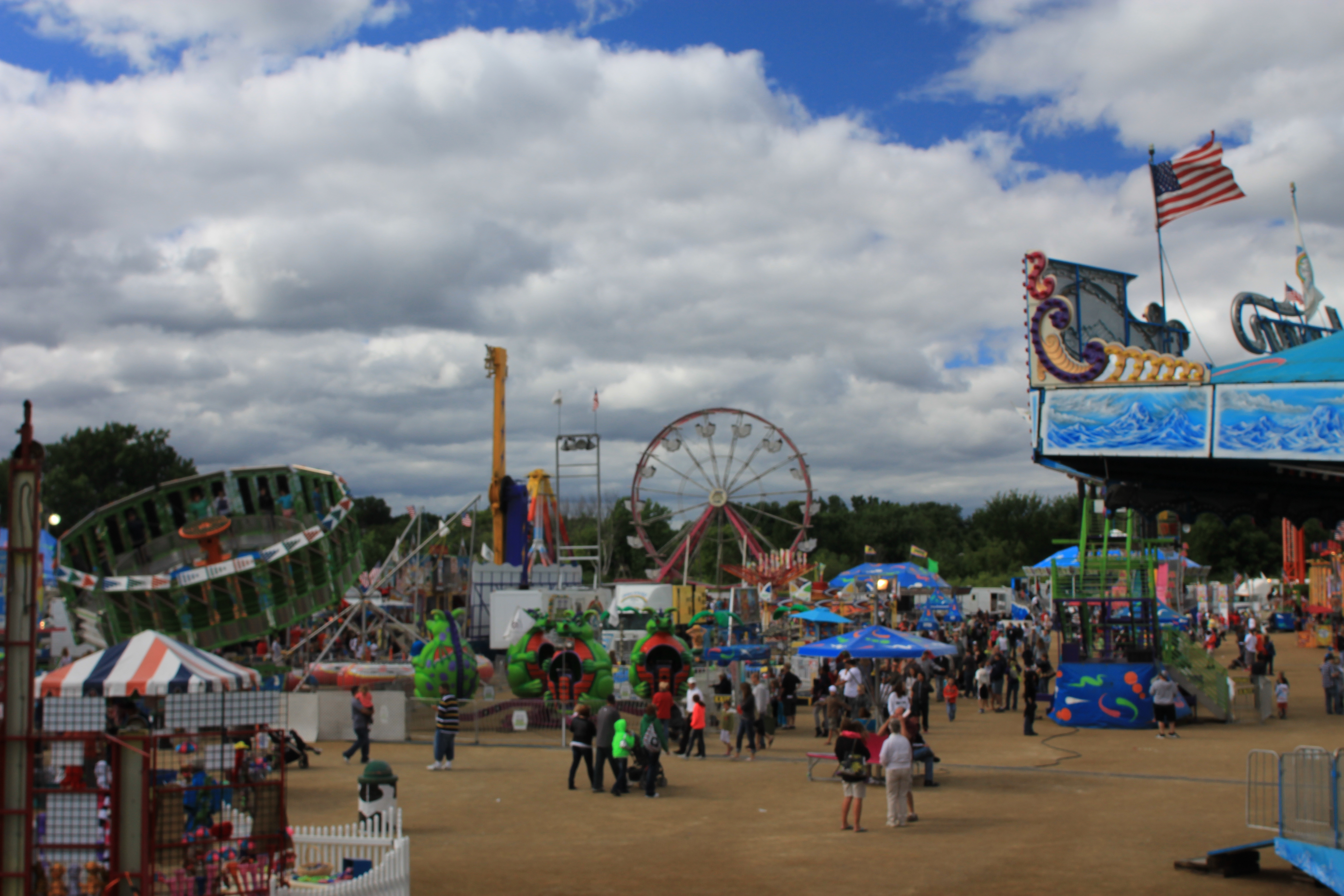
Cronin's efforts included the elimination of the DuPage County Fair and Exposition Authority, the agency that oversaw the county fair.

In 2011, Cronin launched efforts to consolidate units of government in DuPage. His efforts were labelled the "ACT Initiative", where "ACT" stands for "Accountability, Consolidation, Transparency". Cronin worked with State Senator Tom Cullerton and other legislators to propose bills in the General Assembly that would have granted DuPage more authority over agencies whose officers are appointed by the county board. In 2011, after Cronin faced difficulties inspecting the finances of various agencies under his purview, Cullerton sponsored a bill requiring such agencies to provide documents and certain information to the county board. In 2014, Cronin helped form Transform Illinois, a statewide collaboration of elected officials, private organizations, and civic activists. Transform Illinois advocated for legislation favoring government efficiency, though the organization became inactive in 2020 amid the COVID-19 pandemic.

In August 2013, the General Assembly passed a bill that gave the county board the authority to dissolve or consolidate 13 units of government: four sanitary districts, three fire districts, two mosquito abatement districts, the airport authority, county fair authority, housing authority, and a district responsible for street lights. The Timberlake Estates Sanitary District, an inactive district, was dissolved in 2013 with the support of a majority of residents in the district. By 2014, the county government achieved roughly $80 million in savings from reducing or eliminating government agencies. Meanwhile, around 60 board members of agencies under Cronin's purview did not support these consolidation efforts, and either resigned or were not reappointed to their roles. In 2015, Cronin considered the dissolution of the Salt Creek Sanitary District. Eventually, the county eliminated its Fair & Exposition Authority, the Century Hill Street Lighting District, the Fairview Fire Protection District, the Highland Hills Sanitary District, and the North Westmont Fire Protection District.

In 2016, county and state officials estimated that DuPage had saved $116 million through shared services, $20 million through reforming employee benefits, and $6.9 million through closing the county's youth home and consolidating its youth detention services with Kane County.

By 2018, reforms of the county's election commission had achieved roughly $3 million in savings. Cronin proposed merging the election commission into the county clerk's office, expected to save as much as an additional $300,000 annually. In 2017, Senators Harmon and Chris Nybo proposed a bill that would have consolidated the two agencies and established a five-member oversight board within the clerk's office. The board would have included two Democrats and two Republicans appointed by Cronin as county board chairman, with the county clerk serving as the board's fifth member and chairman. Some opponents were against giving Cronin the authority to appoint commissioners to the oversight board, and other opponents expressed concerns about the anticipated salaries of the commissioners in the expanded board. Cronin countered that the full county board would review and approve appointments to the election board, a power that the county board had not previously held. He also expected that salaries of the new election board to fall from the annual pay for commissioners at the time: $27,500. The proposal passed the Senate, but stalled in the House rules committee.

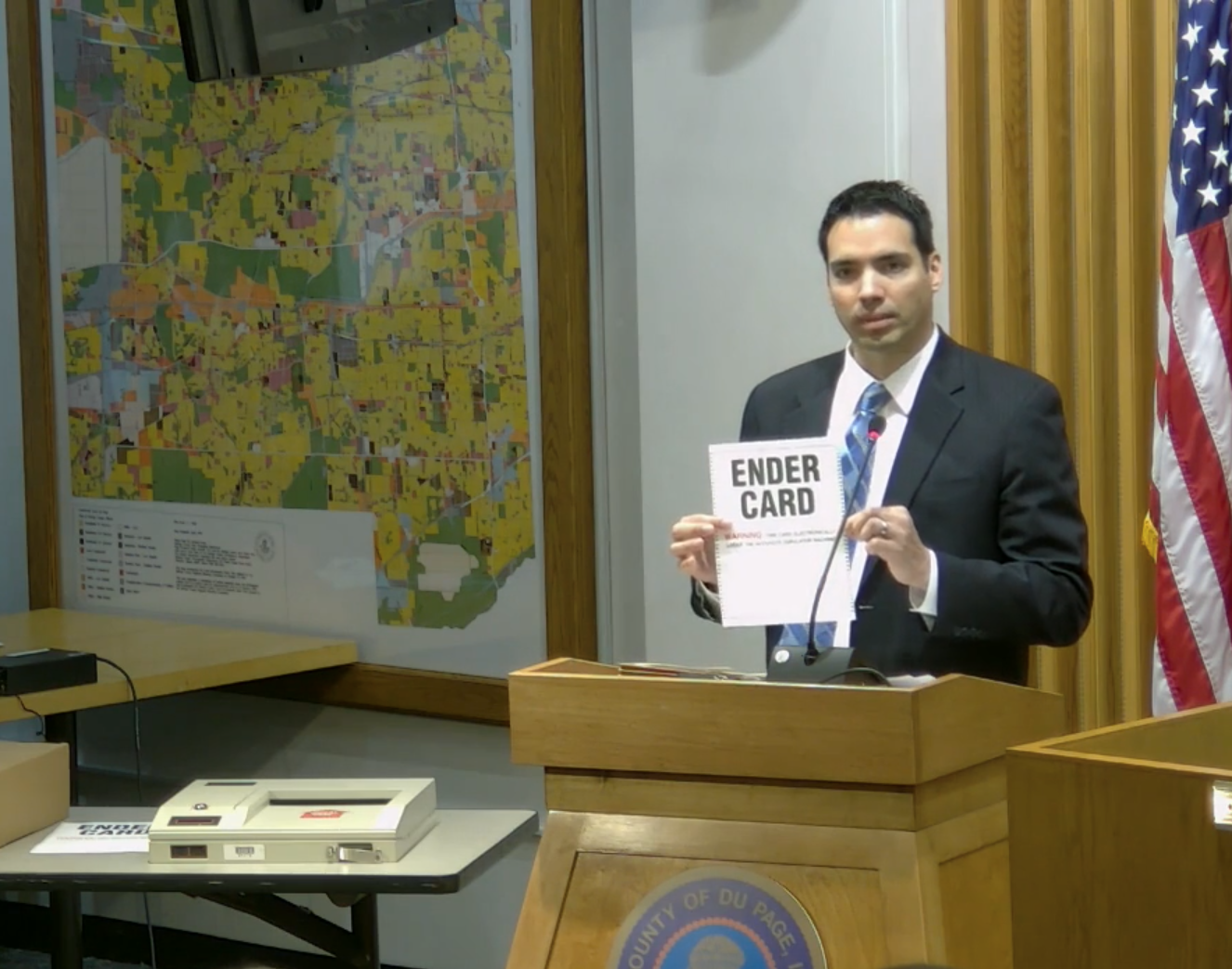
A county election official explains a technical issue that caused reporting delays during the March 2018 primary, amid increasing calls for the election commission to be merged into the clerk's office.

A separate bill, introduced in the House in February 2018, proposed to consolidate the agencies without creating a separate board. A non-binding countywide referendum was held on the matter in March of that year, with 56% of voters supporting consolidation. During the same election, the election commission faced technical issues that caused significant delays in reporting the results, accelerating calls for the merger to take place. In May 2018, the General Assembly passed legislation that would allow the county board to finalize the merger without creating a separate board. In January 2019, the county board formally dissolved the election commission, despite a request from County Clerk Jean Kaczmarek to delay the merger until May.

Cronin has also suggested consolidating the county recorder's office, which is not a constitutional office in Illinois, with another county office or department. As of 2020, Cronin's efforts to consolidate agencies in DuPage, including the election commission, were expected to save $145 million over a 20-year period.

=== Second term ===
Cronin ran for re-election in November 2014. He was challenged by Democratic candidate Robert Peickert, a former small business owner and chairman of the DuPage County Democratic Party. During the campaign, after initial efforts to impose stormwater fees garnered strongly negative public feedback, Cronin proposed setting fees based on how much water a given property displaces into public waterways, while Peickert proposed increasing sales tax revenues to pay for flood mitigation. Peickert also called for more engineering plans and capabilities to support stormwater projects, and criticized Cronin and other officials for not doing enough, but Cronin pointed to a lack of funding as a major constraint. Peickert touted his availability to work full-time as board chairman, in contrast to Cronin, an attorney in addition to his county office. Cronin argued that the connections he formed while a state legislator help him secure funding for the county's stormwater projects. Ultimately, Cronin won with 64 percent of the vote.

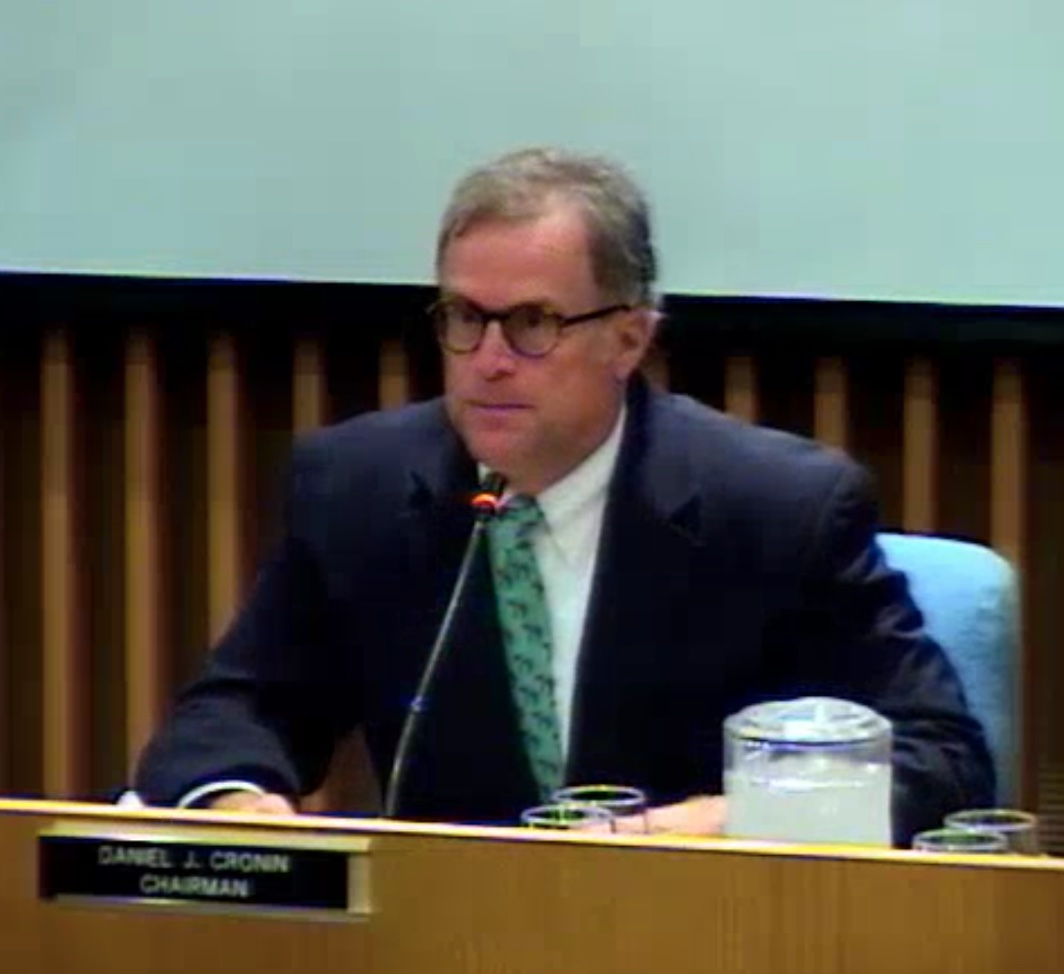
Cronin in 2016

In April 2016, the county's water commission released a tentative budget that reduced operating expenses for the fifth consecutive year, and lowered water rates for the second consecutive year. By June of that year, county officials were able to abolish the 0.25 percent sales tax originally approved in 1985 to fund the water commission, allowing the sales tax on general merchandise in DuPage to fall from 7.25 to 7 percent. Cronin celebrated during a county board meeting by cutting one-fourth of a layer cake designed in the image of a penny.

In August 2016, Cronin supported the county board's decision to spend $290,000 to hire federal and state lobbyists. During the local elections in April 2017, Cronin endorsed Richard Irvin for mayor of Aurora. In September, Cronin appointed Burr Ridge resident Greg Hart to the county board to replace John Curran, who had been appointed to the Senate. Cronin presented a balanced budget for fiscal year 2018, despite the challenges faced from a $2.7 million reduction in revenue. This revenue loss was caused by the state keeping 10% of the income tax revenue intended for municipalities and counties as well as reducing DuPage's share of the RTA sales tax and personal property replacement revenues. Cronin's budget allocated funds toward public safety, the DuPage Care Center, a new communications center for DuPage County Public Safety Communications, among other projects. In November of that year, Cronin joined local mayors and county officials in opposing the Small Cell Wireless Bill (SB1451), proposed state legislation that would regulate small cell wireless installations statewide, but not on a local level. The local officials argued that while 5G technology was needed, statewide regulation would give private companies control over installations on taxpayer-owned facilities, also imposing a low fee for local government to recover costs incurred by the use of those facilities. Local officials urged the state legislature to negotiate the bill to ensure fairness to local communities. The bill was signed into law in April 2018, exempting Chicago from the legislation.

In September 2018, Cronin joined a letter written by Curran, regarding an ongoing public health investigation of a sterilization plant in Willowbrook operated by Sterigenics International. Amidst an attempt by the Illinois Environmental Protection Agency (under the direction of Governor Bruce Rauner) to withhold relevant pollution reports from the office of the Illinois Attorney General, Curran and Cronin urged cooperation between Rauner and Attorney General Lisa Madigan to review the emissions permit previously issued to Sterigenics. Later that month, Cronin met with William Wehrum, assistant administrator of the federal Environmental Protection Agency for air and radiation, to urge increased monitoring of pollutants at the facility.

=== Third term and rise of Democrats ===
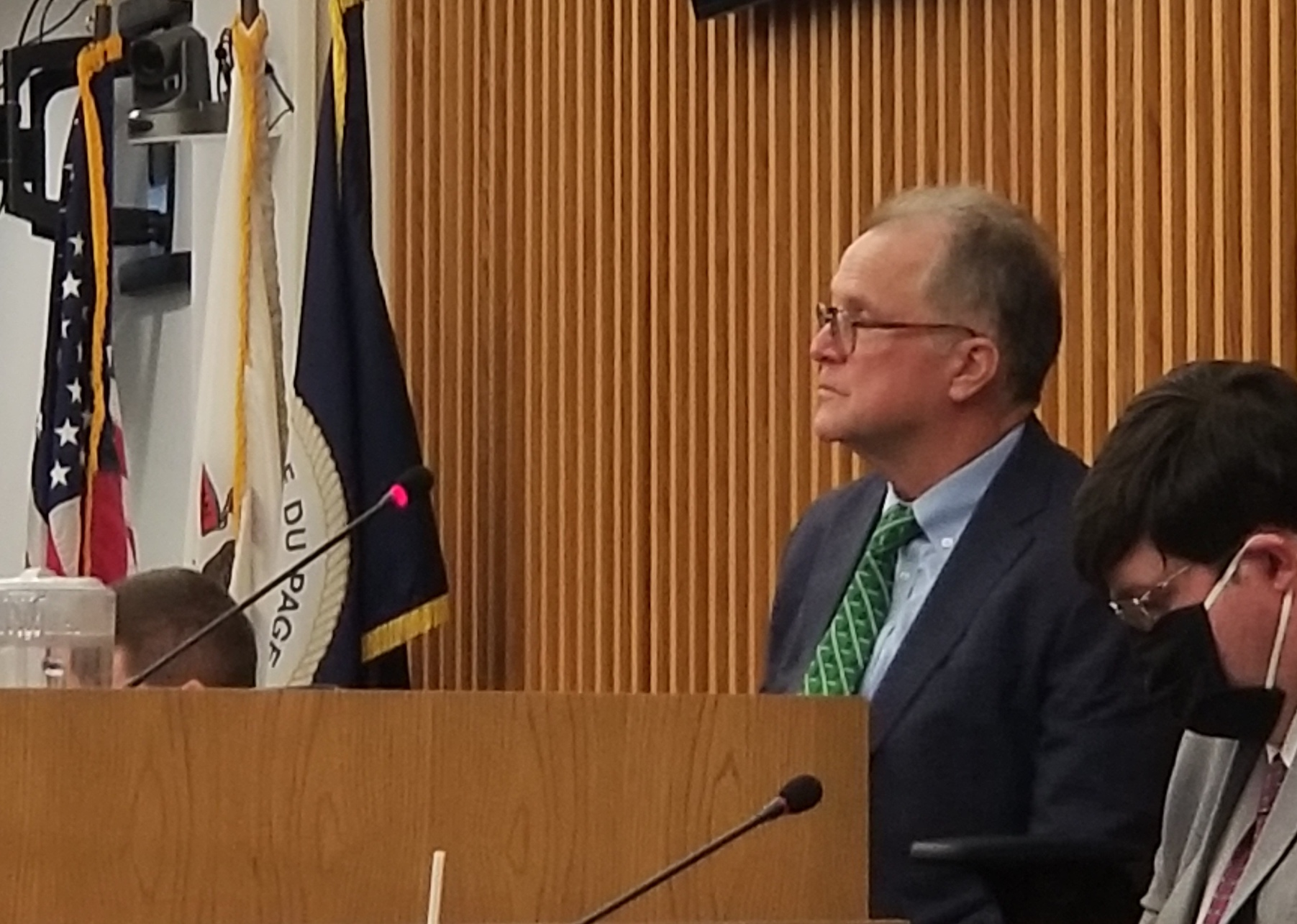
Cronin presiding over a county board meeting in 2022

Cronin ran for reelection in November 2018, and he was challenged by Democratic candidate Lynn LaPlante, principal violist for the Chicago Jazz Philharmonic. Cronin's campaign focused on his record of not raising property taxes on residents. However, Peickert, as chairman of the DuPage County Democratic Party, countered that the board had merely passed a maintenance budget with no initiatives. Cronin won reelection with 51% of the vote, but faced a strong challenge from LaPlante, who earned 49% of the vote. Peickert considered the thin margin to be a good showing for LaPlante, a first-time candidate.

As of the 2018 election, DuPage was no longer a Republican stronghold, with Democrats winning all of the US congressional races in the county. Democrats outperformed Republicans in other elections, winning several state legislative races, the county clerk's race, and one county judgeship. In the county board, which has 18 members, Democrats increased their seats from one to seven. The results were driven by unfavorable opinions of President Donald Trump and Governor Rauner, both Republicans, and the diversifying demographics of DuPage County. Over the year following the election, Cronin lamented increased partisan fighting within the board. Democratic and Republican members fought over appointments and committee assignments, whether to have invocations at the beginning of board meetings, consolidation proposals, and accusations of bullying.

In June 2019, Cronin submitted a proposal to divide the responsibilities of the outgoing county administrator among three executives, which was approved by a 14–3 vote despite accusations that Cronin's plans had not been transparent. In September, Cronin presented his proposed budget for the following fiscal year, but was later criticized by Democrats for not holding workshop meetings or sharing public feedback with the board. He also resisted a request from Kaczmarek and several local chapters of the League of Women Voters to increase the budget for the clerk's office to $9 million. Kaczmarek had requested additional funding to address anticipated record turnout in the 2020 elections, but Cronin still considered it a "dramatic increase". The board approved the budget in November with an 11–6 vote. In October 2019, the board approved a 3% tax on cannabis sales in DuPage. However, the county did not receive tax revenue for 18 months of sales, estimated to be $4 million, after discovering in fall 2021 that the Illinois Department of Revenue had not received the required paperwork from the county clerk's office, run by Kaczmarek. Cronin and Kaczmarek blamed each other for apparent errors in their respective processes.

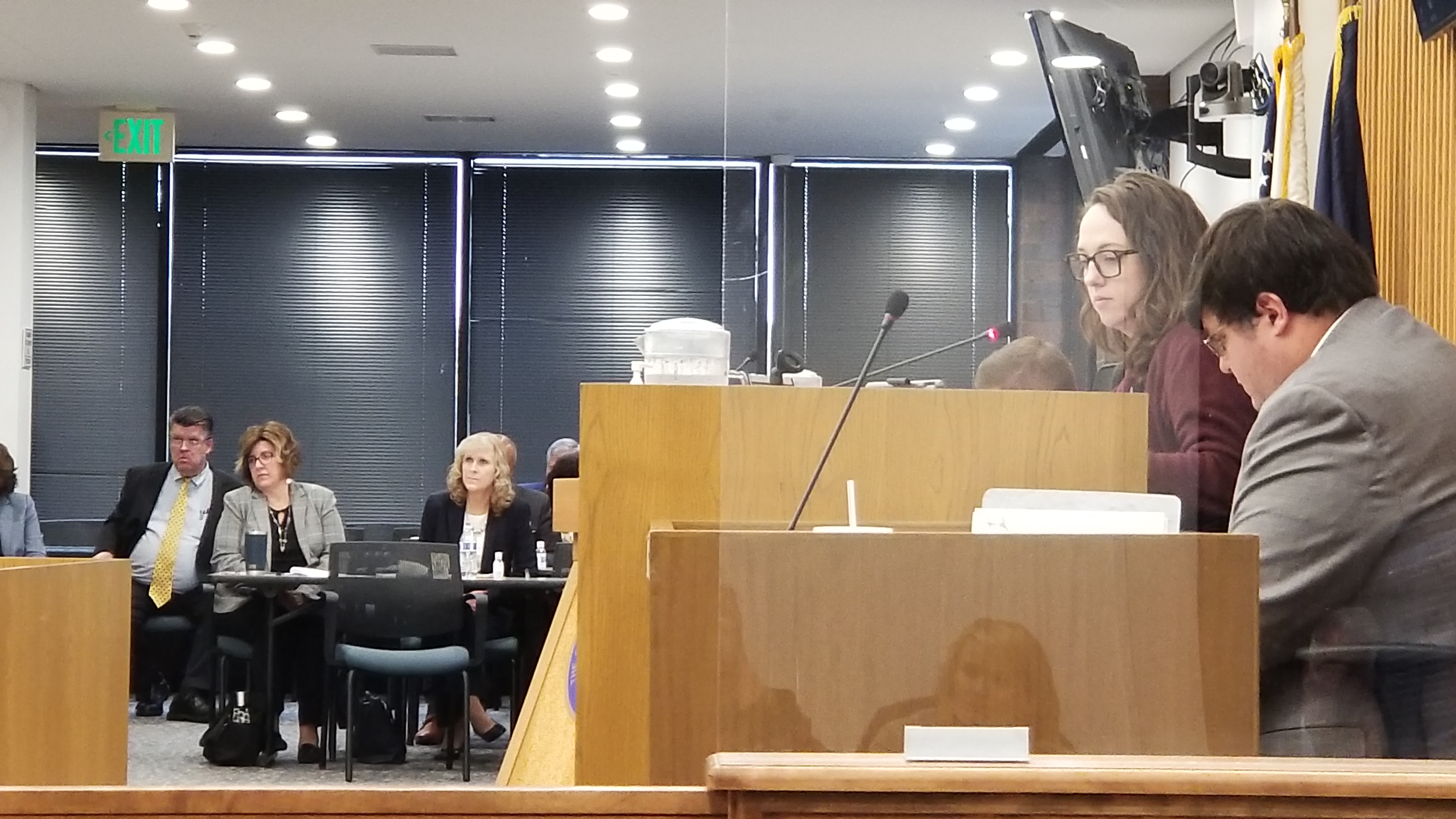
In December 2020, Ashley Selmon (second from right) was unanimously elected to serve as Vice Chairwoman, the first Democratic woman. The vice chair presides over meetings in the chairman's absence.

In July 2020, Democrats on the board criticized Cronin for appointing Republican Sam Tornatore as the chair of the board's health and human services committee, passing over Democrat and committee vice-chair Julie Renehan. During the 2020 elections, Democrats won additional races for the county board, enough to give them a majority for the first time since the 1930s. Democrats in DuPage also prevailed in every federal election and several races at the state and county level.

In early 2021, amidst the COVID-19 pandemic, Cronin criticized the state Department of Public Health for providing inadequate vaccine doses to DuPage. For fiscal year 2022, Cronin drafted a budget that took advantage of rising sales tax revenues while keeping the property tax rate unchanged. With sales tax revenues exceeding expectations by $24 million, the budget included funding to replace aging vehicles, support infrastructure projects, and pay down debt issued for draining projects. In August 2022, Cronin drew controversy for appointing his former Democratic opponent LaPlante, who by then had been elected as a county board member, to the county's board of health, declining to reappoint an incumbent Democrat, Paula Deacon Garcia. Garcia's allies on the county board contended that Cronin's successor should make the appointment, despite the same allies arguing that vacancies needed to be filled. Ultimately, the board approved LaPlante's appointment. Several Democrats also unsuccessfully opposed Cronin's appointment of Noreen Ligino-Kubinski, former alderman of West Chicago, where the airport is located, to the board of the DuPage Airport Authority. In September, Cronin appointed Amy Phillips, a sustainability consultant from Naperville, to fill a vacancy on the county board left by the resignation of Democratic member Amy Chavez. Her appointment received unanimous approval by the County Board. By the end of fiscal year 2022, Cronin left behind a $40 million surplus and a balanced budget for fiscal year 2023. The surplus was driven by sales tax revenues exceeding the county's initial expectations, especially taxes on internet sales, a relatively new source of revenue. The surplus was allocated towards new projects including nursing home renovations, transportation infrastructure, a stormwater project and installation of roof-mounted solar panels, to name a few. Cronin reduced property taxes for the average DuPage County homeowner while also providing pay raises for employees. In Cronin's time as chairman, he managed to secure a balanced budget each year.

=== Succession ===
In September 2021, Cronin announced that he would not run for re-election at the end of his term in 2022. At the time, his campaign fund held over $400,000. Though he stated that he was not leaving because of the Democratic majority on the board, he continued to express frustration with the partisan disputes. Supporters have encouraged him to run for statewide or federal office in the future. Cronin was mentioned as a potential challenger to incumbent J. B. Pritzker in the 2022 race for governor, but he dismissed such speculation. He supported Irvin, a candidate in the Republican primary, as a member of Irvin's law enforcement advisory council.

Cronin endorsed Hart, who by then had moved to Hinsdale, to succeed him as board chairman during the 2022 elections. Hart won the Republican primary but was defeated by Deb Conroy, a state representative and the Democratic nominee. Cronin shared his plans to serve on nonprofit boards and remain politically active, using his campaign fund to support like-minded candidates. Upon leaving office as board chairman, Cronin formed the DuPage Leadership political action committee to promote Republicans and Democrats running for local office. He also announced plans to continue working at his law firm, take a European vacation, and mentor young policymakers.
