= IMRF =

IMRF may refer to:

- Illinois Municipal Retirement Fund
- International Maritime Rescue Federation
