= Claiming race =

Thoroughbred horse race where the horses are up for sale

In Thoroughbred racing, a claiming race is a type of horse race in which the horses are all for sale at a specified claiming price until shortly before the race. They were known as selling races until 1924 after which they were relabeled claiming races.

In the hierarchy of horse races, based on the quality of the horses that compete, claiming races are at the bottom, below maiden races (races for horses that have never won a race). Most races are claiming races in the United States. For example, 54% of all Kentucky races run in 1999 were claiming races but had only 20% of the purse dollar value, the lowest average purse among race types.

The mechanics of claiming vary based on jurisdiction but in most cases almost anyone, or possibly anyone who is licensed to own racehorses, may claim. For example, the Illinois Racing Board stipulates that any horse may be claimed for its entered price by any licensed owner or agent or anyone who has filed an application and been granted a claiming license. Title to the horse typically transfers just before the start of the race, but the previous owner is entitled to the purse, if any, that results from the horse's performance in the race. Usually related parties such as the trainer or employees, or relatives, are prohibited from claiming, as are reciprocal agreements between owners to "protect" each other's horses. If a horse is purchased, a track official tags it (often with a red tag) after the race, and it goes to its new owner, assuming the new owner had sufficient funds on deposit.

Claiming races have claim amounts which vary, and higher amounts tend to have richer purses. The intent of this is to even the race; if a better-than-class horse is entered (with the expectation of an easy purse win), it might be lost for the claiming price, which is likely less than the horse is worth. Someone may wish to claim a horse if they think the horse has not been trained to its fullest potential under another trainer.

Claiming races serve several purposes. They are a quality classification, as well as a way of ensuring racing outcomes are less predictable, which in turn increases the handle, or amount of parimutuel betting, and a way to bring liquidity to the racehorse marketplace. Although many horses never rise above claiming races, some do. For example Stymie, a US$1500 claimer, went on to earn over US$900,000, winning many top-level stakes and handicap races in the 1940s. General Quarters, a US$20,000 claimer, won the grade 1 Blue Grass Stakes and ran in the 2009 Kentucky Derby. Make A Stand, claimed for £8,000 in 1995, won the 1997 Champion Hurdle. In 2018, Maximum Security won a claiming race, but was not claimed, and went on to run in the 2019 Kentucky Derby, and initially appeared to win, but was disqualified for interfering with other horses. The 2022 Kentucky Derby winner Rich Strike was purchased in a claiming race for $30,000, was entered into the Derby only after Ethereal Road was scratched, and won at 80-1 odds.
