= Serve Illinois Commission =

State agency in Illinois, United States

The Serve Illinois Commission on Volunteerism and Community Service (or simply Serve Illinois) is a 40-member, bi-partisan board appointed by the Governor. Its mission is to improve Illinois communities by enhancing traditional volunteer activities and supporting national service programs. The Commission is accomplishing this mission through the support of local community-based efforts to enhance volunteer opportunities and the administration of Illinois' AmeriCorps programs.

== Overview ==
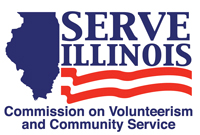
Serve Illinois

The Serve Illinois Commission is a 40-member, bi-partisan board appointed by the Governor. Its mission is to improve Illinois communities by enhancing traditional volunteer activities and supporting national service programs. The Commission is accomplishing this mission through the support of local community-based efforts to enhance volunteer opportunities and the administration of Illinois' AmeriCorps programs.

The Commission's vision is an Illinois where all citizens recognize their ability and responsibility to help strengthen their communities through voluntary service. It works to expand volunteerism throughout rural, suburban, and urban Illinois, involving people of all backgrounds, cultures, and ages.

The enabling legislation of the Serve Illinois Commission (PA91-798, 20 ILCS 710) charges the Commission to promote and support community service in public and private programs to meet the needs of Illinois citizens, to stimulate new volunteerism and community service initiatives and partnerships, and to serve as a resource and advocate within the Department of Human Services for community service agencies, volunteers, and programs which utilize state and private volunteers.

In July 2014, Serve Illinois Commission was relocated to the Illinois Department of Public Health. The move was aligned with Governor Quinn's increased focus on helping communities recover from disasters following a record setting period of disasters.

== Leadership and organizational structure ==
=== Executive Director ===
Serve Illinois is led by an Executive Director appointed by the Governor. With the concurrence of the Director of the Illinois Department of Public Health (IDPH), the Executive Director administers the activities of the Commission. Scott McFarland is Serve Illinois' current Executive Director.

=== Commissioners ===
Serve Illinois consists of up to 25 voting members and 15 nonvoting ex officio members. At least 25% of the members are from the city of Chicago, and no more than 50% may be from the same political party. Members of Serve Illinois are appointed by the Governor to serve three-year terms. Members may not serve more than three full consecutive three-year terms, except for those specifically mandated by the enabling state legislation. Both voting and nonvoting ex officio members are allowed to serve on committees.

The Serve Illinois by-laws stipulate that voting commission members must include:

- An individual with expertise in the educational, training and developmental needs of youth, particularly disadvantaged youth;
- An individual with experience in promoting the involvement of older adults in service and volunteerism;
- A representative of community-based organizations within the state;
- The State Superintendent of Education;
- A representatives of local governments in the State;
- A representative of local labor organizations in the State;
- The Chairman of the City Colleges of a municipality with a population of more than 2 million;
- The human services department of a municipality with a population of more than 2 million;
- The Superintendent of Police of a municipality with a population of more than 2 million;
- The President of a County Board of a county with a population of more than 2 million;
- The Public Health Commissioner of a municipality with a population of more than 2 million;
- A representatives of a national service program;
- A youth between 16 and 25 years old who is a participant or supervisor in a community service program;
- A representative of the business community.

The by-laws also require the State Corporation Representative to serve as an ex officio (nonvoting) member.

=== Officers ===
Serve Illinois has two officers: a Chair and a Vice Chair. Both are elected by the Commission, and serve two-year terms. The Chair is responsible for facilitating meetings of the Commission and the Executive Committee, assisting the Executive Director in planning the agenda for Commission meetings, and representing the Commission and the Department of Human Services as needed. The Vice Chair will assume the responsibilities of the Chair in the event of the Chair's absence or resignation. When the Vice Chair permanently assumes the responsibilities of the Chair, an election will be held to identify a new Vice Chair who shall serve until the next election.

=== Committees ===
Serve Illinois has four standing committees:

- Executive
- Community Outreach
- Public Relations and Marketing
- Resource Development

Additional committees may be established by a majority vote.

== Services ==
=== AmeriCorps ===
AmeriCorps

Serve Illinois oversees the annual grant competition that awards funding to AmeriCorps State and handles administration of those grants after they are awarded. On October 7, 2013, Governor Pat Quinn and Serve Illinois announced that the Corporation for National and Community Service (CNCS) had awarded $7.5 million to enable 900 volunteers in 29 AmeriCorps programs to better serve Illinois communities. The announcement comes at the beginning of a yearlong 20th anniversary celebration for the program.

AmeriCorps programs receiving funds from the Corporation for National and Community Service are:

- American Red Cross, Safe Families – Chicago
- Academy for Urban School Leadership – Chicago
- Asian Human Services – Chicago
- Illinois Bar Foundation, Illinois Justice Corps – Chicago
- Children’s Home Association of Illinois – Peoria
- City Year – Chicago
- Greater Chicago Food Depository – Chicago
- Illinois Public Health Association – Springfield
- Lessie Bates Davis Neighborhood House – East St. Louis
- Literacy Volunteers of Illinois, Project VOCAL – Chicago
- Lutheran Social Services, Prisoner & Family Ministries – Marion
- Peace Corps Fellows, Western Illinois University – Macomb
- Project MORE, University of Illinois Board of Trustees – Chicago
- Project YES, Northwestern University Settlement Association – Chicago
- Public Allies – Chicago
- Public Health Institute of Metro Chicago, Healthy Communities Corps – Chicago
- Rend Lake College – Ina
- Sauk Valley Community College, ABC Program – Dixon
- Schuler Family Foundation – Chicago
- Southwestern Illinois College – Belleville
- Springfield Urban League – Springfield
- Teach For America – Chicago
- Up2Us Sports- Chicago
- Western Illinois University Quad Cities Campus - Moline
- West Suburban PADS – Maywood
- Youth Guidance - Chicago)
- Youth Organization Umbrella – Evanston
- YMCA of Rock River Valley - Rockford

=== Cities of Service ===
Serve Illinois has taken an active role in connecting municipal leaders in the state with Cities of Service, a national, bipartisan coalition of more than 170 mayors committed to addressing critical city needs through impact volunteering. Rapidly expanding outreach in 2013 helped Illinois become the number one state in the nation for Cities of Service. In December 2013, Campton Hills, Illinois, became Illinois's first city to be awarded funds from the Impact Volunteering fund. Mayor Patsy Smith will use the award to help residents prepare for emergencies.

=== Volunteerism Conferences and Networks ===
Serve Illinois co-sponsors several annual conferences around the state that build skills and networks among volunteer managers and coordinators. Offering training through workshops and keynote speeches, topics covered at past conferences include volunteer retention, navigating grants, volunteering after disasters, and program evaluation. Serve Illinois is involved in other networks that engage volunteers such as Volunteer Centers of Illinois and Illinois's state chapter of National Voluntary Organizations Active in Disaster.

Four conferences planned for summer 2014:

- Central Illinois Volunteerism Conference
- Illinois Conference on Volunteer Administration (Northeastern Illinois)
- Southern Illinois Volunteerism Conference
- Northwestern Illinois/MVDOVIA Volunteerism Conference

== Related legislation ==
Serve Illinois operates under several federal statutes including:

- The Domestic Volunteer Service Act of 1973
- The National and Community Service Act of 1990
- The Edward M. Kennedy Serve America Act of 2009

Serve Illinois also operates under the Illinois Commission on Volunteerism and Community Service Act (P.A. 91‑798).

The enabling legislation of the Serve Illinois Commission (PA91-798, 20 ILCS 710) charges the Commission to promote and support community service in public and private programs to meet the needs of Illinois citizens, to stimulate new volunteerism and community service initiatives and partnerships, and to serve as a resource and advocate within the Department of Human Services for community service agencies, volunteers, and programs which utilize state and private volunteers.

== See also ==
Illinois Governor Bruce Rauner

AmeriCorps

List of Illinois state agencies
