= Ted Leverenz =

American politician (1941–2020)

Ted E. Leverenz (June 19, 1941 – April 8, 2020) was an American politician who served as a Democratic member of the Illinois General Assembly from 1975 to 1993.

== Biography ==
Leverenz was born June 19, 1941, in Blue Island, Illinois. He was educated at Carl Sandburg High School in Orland Park, Illinois, and Southern Illinois University Carbondale in Carbondale, Illinois. Leverenz worked as a business consultant. He was elected to the Illinois House of Representatives as one of three members from the 5th legislative district. After the passage of the Cutback Amendment, he was elected to represent the 51st district. During his time in the House, he rose to become the Chairman of the House's Appropriations Committee.

In the early 1990s he was appointed to the Illinois Senate. In the 1991 decennial reapportionment, Leverenz was gerrymandered by the Republican Party into a heavily Republican district that included a large swath of what was then staunchly-Republican DuPage County. He was defeated in the 1992 general election by Republican candidate Daniel Cronin.

Leverenz died on April 8, 2020. He was 78 years old.
