= Deb Conroy =

American politician

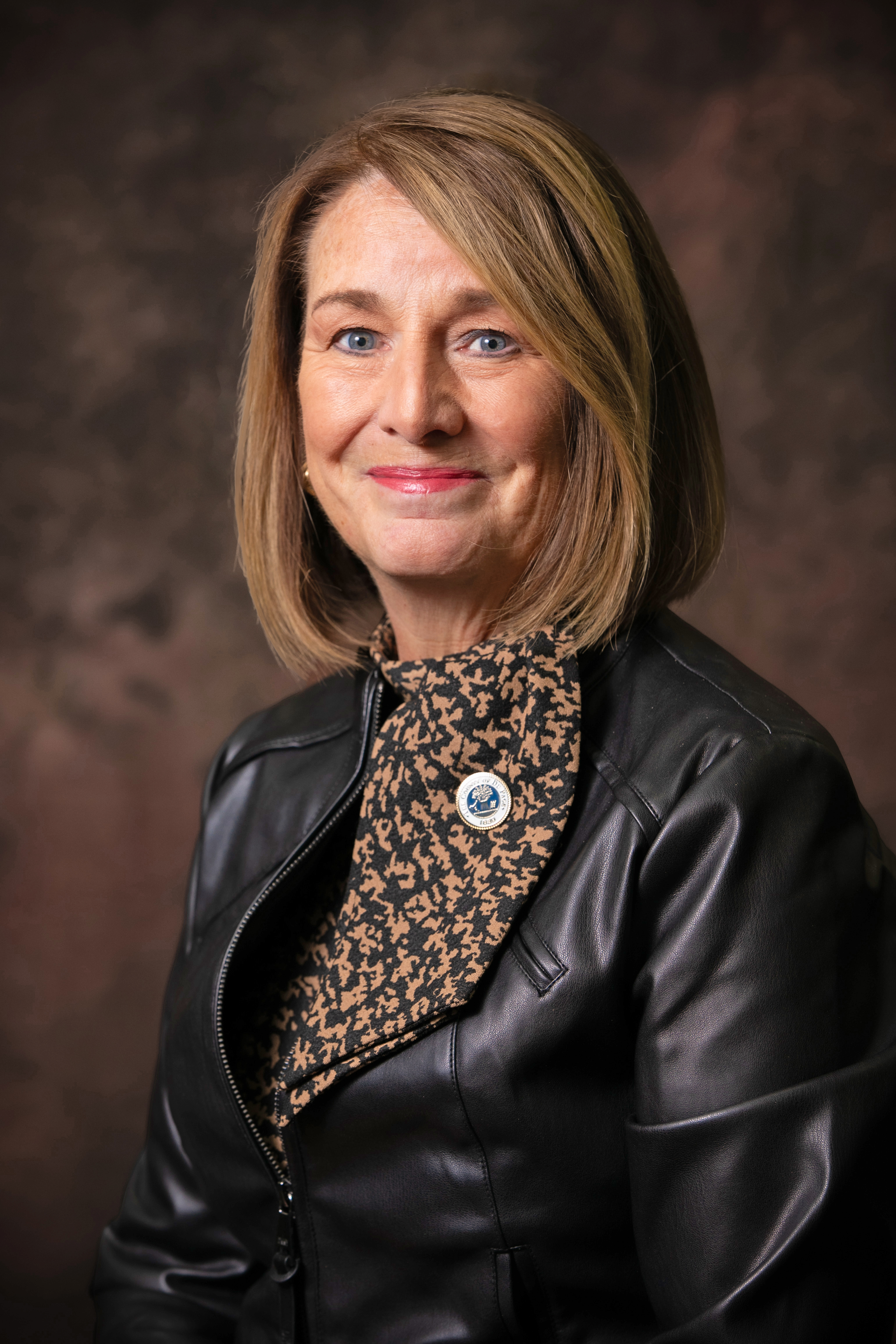
- Conroy in 2024

Chair of the DuPage County Board
- Incumbent
- Assumed office December 5, 2022
- Preceded by: Dan Cronin

Member of the Illinois House of Representatives from the 46th district
- In office January 9, 2013 – December 5, 2022
- Preceded by: Dennis Reboletti (redistricted)
- Succeeded by: Diane Blair-Sherlock

Personal details
- Born: August 29, 1962 (age 63) Elmhurst, Illinois, U.S.
- Party: Democratic
- Children: 4 sons
- Education: College of DuPage; Columbia College Chicago

Deborah O'Keefe Conroy (born 29 August 1962) is an American politician currently serving as chair of the county board of DuPage County, Illinois. She previously served as a member of the Illinois House of Representatives, representing the 46th district from 2012 through 2022. She is also a former member of the school board of Elmhurst Community Unit School District 205.

== Electoral career ==
Deb Conroy first ran to be a state representative in 2010 as the Democratic candidate for District 46 of the Illinois House of Representatives. She lost to Dennis Reboletti, the Republican incumbent, by a margin of 16 percentage points.

Conroy ran again in 2012 for the District 46 seat in the Illinois House of Representatives after redistricting. In the primary, Conroy ran unopposed as the Democratic nominee, and later faced Republican nominee, Daniel J. Kordik. Conroy won in the general election with 58% of the vote.

Conroy was re-elected to her position in 2014, 2016, 2018, and 2020. She was sworn in to her fifth term as State Representative in January 2021.

== Illinois State Representative ==
=== Committees ===
At the time of her retirement from the Illinois House, Conroy served on five House committees and one subcommittee:

- Mental Health & Addiction committee (Chairperson)
- Elementary Secondary Education: School Curriculum & Policies committee
- Insurance committee
- Labor & Commerce committee
- Prescription Drug Affordability committee
- Special Issues subcommittee

In the House, Conroy served as whip of the women's caucus.

On February 3, 2017, Conroy was selected as the new chairperson for the Mental Health & Addiction Committee. Prior to her appointment, Conroy said that she had held her own "Mental Health Advisory Committee" in her district for four years. In 2021, Conroy sponsored a bill that effectively extended Medicaid insurance coverage to ABA therapy. Conroy had previously served as a member of the Counties and Townships Committee, the Health Care Availability Access Committee, the Juvenile Justice and System Involved Committee, the Construction Industry & Code Enforcement Committee, the Government Consolidation & Modernization Committee, the Higher Education Committee, the Police & First Responders Committee, the Justice System Subcommittee, and is the former vice-chairperson of the Youth and Young Adults Committee.

In 2018, Democrat J. B. Pritzker appointed Conroy as a member of the gubernatorial transition's Healthy Children and Families Committee.

=== Legislation ===
As the chair of the House Mental Health and Addiction Committee, Conroy's legislative priorities often tied in with mental healthcare and wellness.

In April 2017, HB 3502, a bill that was introduced by Conroy, passed the Illinois House with unanimous support. In July 2017, Illinois Governor Bruce Rauner signed the bill into law. Upon taking effect, the legislation set up an advisory council with the goal of developing recommendations and an action plan to address the barriers to early and regular screening and identification of mental health conditions in children, adolescents and young adults in Illinois.

In 2021, HB 1805, which was originally filed by Conroy, was signed into law by Illinois Governor J. B. Pritzker. The legislation permanently established the Call4Calm mental health support text line.

== DuPage County board chairperson ==
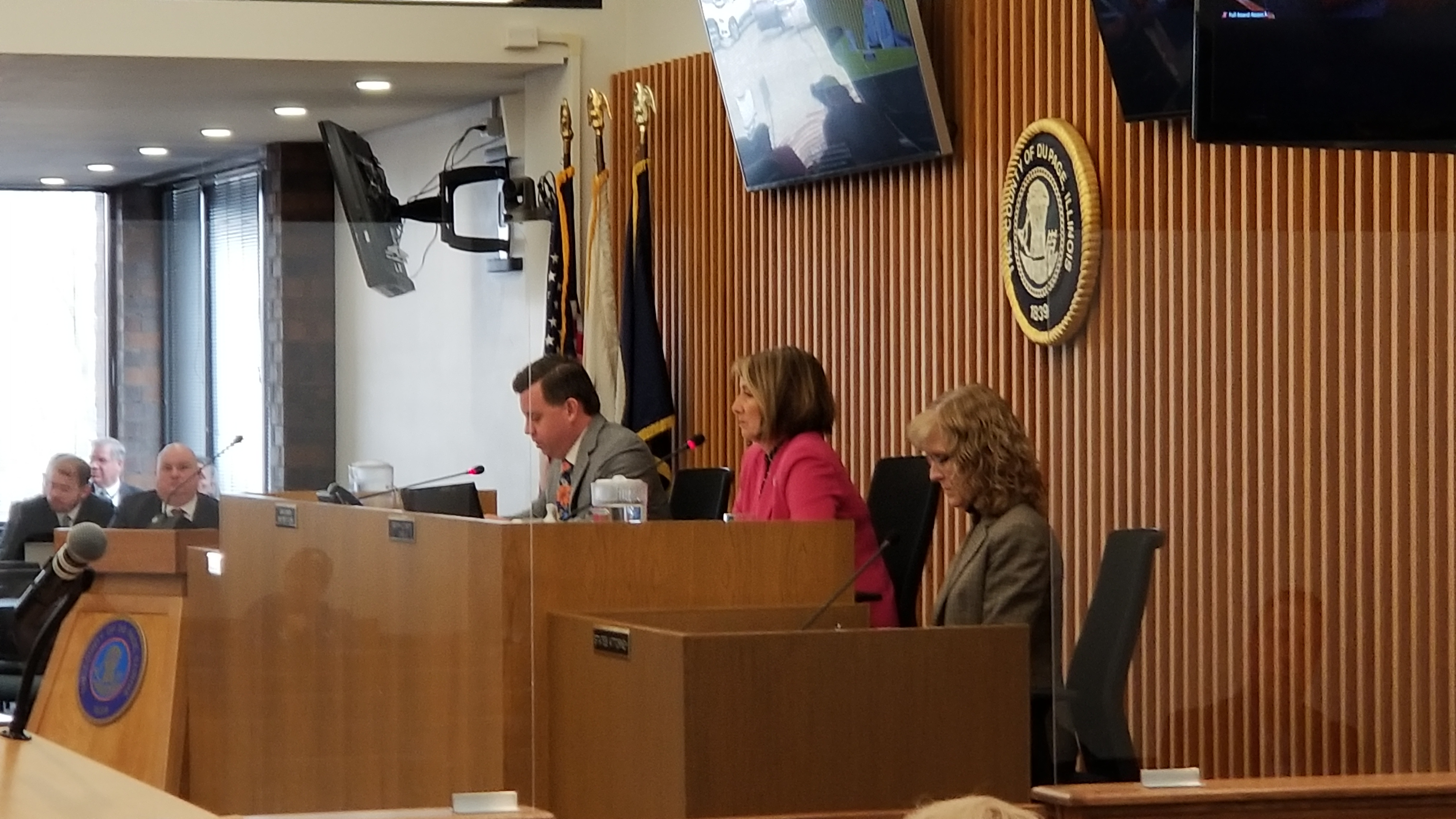
Conroy (second from right) presiding over a county board meeting

In January 2022, Conroy announced that she would not seek re-election to her Illinois House seat, and instead announced the start of her campaign to succeed Dan Cronin as the county board chairperson of DuPage County. Cronin had previously announced in September 2021 that he would not be running for reelection. In addition to Conroy, Democratic county board members Liz Chaplin and Lynn LaPlante also announced their campaigns for the same position. Chaplin dropped out of the race when Conroy announced her campaign, citing personal reasons and her desire to avoid a contested primary battle. Chaplin endorsed Conroy, whose campaign had the most funding among the Democratic candidates. Two months later, LaPlante also ended her campaign for the county board chair, leaving Conroy as the only candidate for the Democratic nomination. Both Chaplin and LaPlante instead ran for re-election to their respective seats on the county board.

During the general election, Conroy was challenged by Republican nominee Greg Hart, a 35-year-old management consultant and incumbent county board member from Hinsdale. Hart raised $1.7 million during the campaign, almost double Conroy's funds of $924,000. Hart was supported by many within the county's Republican establishment, having received endorsements from Cronin and other Republican officials.

Conroy defeated Hart in the general election. She is the first woman to chair the county board, and the first Democrat to hold the position in over 75 years. Her victory reflected the changing politics of DuPage, which had historically been a Republican stronghold until Democrats gained more solid political footing in recent years. As chair, Conroy has stated that she plans to focus on environmental issues, address climate change, establish a mental health committee, and designate a chair of diversity on the board.

== Personal life ==
Conroy is from Elmhurst, Illinois, and has four adult sons. She attended York Community High School, College of DuPage, and Columbia College Chicago.

== Electoral history ==
Illinois 46th State House District General Election, 2010
Party	Candidate	Votes	%
Republican	Dennis M. Reboletti (incumbent)	15,957	58.18
Democratic	Deborah O'Keefe Conroy	11,469	41.82
Total votes		27,426	100.0

Illinois 46th State House District General Election, 2012
Party	Candidate	Votes	%
Democratic	Deborah O'Keefe Conroy	20,200	57.67
Republican	Daniel J. Kordik	14,825	42.33
Total votes		35,025	100.0

Illinois 46th State House District General Election, 2014
Party	Candidate	Votes	%
Democratic	Deb Conroy (incumbent)	12,774	52.53
Republican	Heidi Holan	11,542	47.47
Total votes		24,316	100.0

Illinois 46th State House District General Election, 2016
Party	Candidate	Votes	%
Democratic	Deb Conroy (incumbent)	23,369	58.97
Republican	Heidi Holan	16,257	41.03
Total votes		39,626	100.0

Illinois 46th State House District General Election, 2018
Party	Candidate	Votes	%
Democratic	Deb Conroy (incumbent)	18,679	58.68
Republican	Gordon (Jay) Kinzler	13,155	41.32
Total votes		31,834	100.0

Illinois 46th State House District General Election, 2020
Party	Candidate	Votes	%
Democratic	Deb Conroy (incumbent)	34,949	100.00
Total votes		34,949	100.0

DuPage County Board Chairman Election, 2022
Party	Candidate	Votes	%
Democratic	Deb Conroy	172,068	51.32
Republican	Greg Hart	163,233	48.68
Total votes		335,301	100.0
Democratic gain from Republican			
