= State Universities Retirement System =

Government agency of Illinois, U.S.

State Universities Retirement System of Illinois (SURS)

Agency overview
- Formed: 1941
- Headquarters: Champaign, Illinois, United States
- Employees: 164 (2022)
- Agency executives: Suzanne Mayer, Executive Director; John Atkinson, Chairperson, Board of Trustees
- Website: surs.org

The State Universities Retirement System, or SURS, is an agency in the U.S. state of Illinois government that administers retirement, disability, death, and survivor benefits to eligible SURS participants and annuitants. Membership in SURS is attained through employment with 61 employing agencies, including public universities, community colleges, and other qualified state agencies. Eligible employees are automatically enrolled in SURS when employment begins. SURS participants do not pay Federal Social Security taxes and are not eligible for Federal Social Security coverage based on their employment with a SURS-covered employer.

== History ==
The Governor and General Assembly founded the University Retirement System in 1941 as an administrator of benefits for employees of the University of Illinois. In the following years, the system grew to include other universities, colleges, and affiliated agencies throughout the state. In 1963, the system adopted its current name, State Universities Retirement System (SURS). SURS employs approximately 132 individuals in its Champaign, Illinois and Naperville, Illinois offices and provides retirement, survivor, disability, and death benefits. SURS serves over 228,000 active and inactive members and benefit recipients throughout the world. SURS is considered a component unit of the State of Illinois’ financial reporting entity and is included in the state's financial reports as a pension trust fund. SURS is governed by Section 5/15, Chapter 40, of the Illinois Compiled Statutes.

== Membership ==
SURS serves a diverse group of members with occupations ranging from professors and teachers to clerical, building service workers, and groundskeepers. Unlike many other public pension systems, SURS is the sole source of retirement income for its participants. The state/employer does not contribute to Social Security on the employee's behalf and there is no coordinated benefit for SURS-covered employment from Social Security upon retirement. Receipt of a SURS annuity may reduce, or eliminate entirely, his or her Social Security benefit at retirement under the Windfall Elimination Provision or the Government Pension Offset Participation in the State Universities Retirement System (SURS) is mandatory for all eligible University employees. The employee contribution to the system is 8% of the gross salary. University employees do not contribute to Social Security. SURS contributions are deducted from your pay on a pre-tax basis, and income taxes will be due when you make withdrawals at retirement. Eligible employees must select one of the three SURS plan options (Traditional, Portable, or Retirement Savings Plan) within 6 months of your date of hire. This is a lifetime, irrevocable decision.

== Funding history ==
Prior to 1989, 15-155 provided the employer contribution should be "sufficient to meet the requirements of this Article in accordance with actuarial determinations." The statute further provided that in no event were employer contributions from state appropriations to be less than an amount which, when added to contributions from other sources, is less than the total accruing normal costs plus interest at the prescribed rate on the unfunded accrued liabilities.

Public Act 86-273, effective August 23, 1989, attempted to add some particularity. It provided: "Starting with the fiscal year which ends in 1990, the state's contribution shall be increased incrementally over a 7 year period so that by the fiscal year which ends in 1996, the minimum contribution to be made by the State shall be an amount that, when added to other sources of employer contributions, is sufficient to meet the normal cost and amortize the unfunded liability over 40 years as a level percentage of payroll, determined under the projected unit credit actuarial cost method. The State contribution, as a percentage of the applicable employee payroll, shall be increased in equal annual increments over the 7 year period until the funding requirement specified above is met."

People EX REL. Sklodowski V. STATE The General Assembly and the Governor did not live up to the provisions of this amended 15-155. A Class action suit was brought against the State for failure to live up to the provisions of the funding program established in public act 86-273. The case went to the Illinois Supreme Court, where the court ruled, in 1994, that participants and retirement systems have neither a constitutional or a vested contractual right to enforce statutory funding obligations.

== Retirement plans ==
Upon enrollment with SURS members must choose one of three retirement options.

=== Traditional Pension Plan ===
This is the historical SURS defined benefit retirement plan. Unless a member chooses one of the other plans within a specified period of time they are automatically enrolled in the traditional plan. Until 1998 it was the only SURS plan available. It provides lifetime retirement benefits and provides for a survivor benefit at no additional cost.

=== Portable Pension Plan ===
This is also a Defined Benefit retirement plan that has much in common with the Traditional Benefit Package. However, it provides a more generous separation refund if you leave the system. But the provisions for survivor benefits require a reduction to the retirement and death benefits.

=== Retirement Savings Plan (RSP) ===
This is a Defined Contribution plan that establishes an account in your name into which your contributions and the employer (State of Illinois) contributions are placed. You decide how your account balance will be invested, selecting from a variety of mutual funds and variable annuities.

== Reciprocity ==
SURS has reciprocity only with other Illinois public retirement systems in determining your eligibility for, and amount of, SURS retirement and survivor benefits. These other systems are:

- County Employees' Annuity and Benefit Fund of Cook County
- Forest Preserve District Employees' Annuity and Benefit Fund of Cook County
- General Assembly Retirement System
- Illinois Municipal Retirement Fund
- Judges Retirement System of Illinois
- Laborers' Annuity and Benefit Fund
- Metropolitan Water Reclamation District Retirement Fund
- Municipal Employees' Annuity and Benefit Fund of Chicago
- Park Employees' Annuity and Benefit Fund of Chicago
- Public School Teachers' Pension and Retirement Fund of Chicago
- State Retirement Systems of Illinois
- State Teachers' Retirement System

The Illinois Retirement Systems Reciprocal Act ensures that pension credits remain in the system in which they are earned. You may not transfer your credits from one system to another. You will be entitled to a retirement annuity from each system, and you survivor(s) will qualify for a survivors annuity, if:

- You have at least 1 year of pension credit in more than one of the retirement systems; and
- Your combined service credits are equal to the longest minimum service requirement of any of the systems in which you have credit.

== Investment program history ==
SURS has been developing its investment program since the early 1980s, when Illinois, like many other states, changed its laws to allow the state pension funds to adopt modern investment practices. At the same time, the new laws established a high standard of fiduciary responsibility, namely adopting the prudent expert rule. Those changes permitted the investment program to modernize, resulting in investment income and gains of more than $13.6 billion over the past twenty-five years. This growth in assets has been achieved during a time when the fund has earned 10.0 percent per year. During this same period, funding by the State of Illinois fell far short of both the actuarial and statutory requirements, missing an opportunity for SURS to significantly reduce, if not eliminate, its unfunded liability.

== Investment managers ==
As of 31 December 2008, SURS uses 40+ direct investment managers, of which 20+ are minority-owned or female-owned. SURS also has 17+ indirect investment managers, all of which are minority-owned or female-owned. Minority-owned and female-owned investment managers invest over 10% of the System's total assets. More than 25% of the SURS portfolio is indexed or passively managed.

== See also ==
- Teachers' Retirement System of the State of Illinois the comparable system for downstate public schools.
