= Climate change in Illinois =

Climate change in the US state of Illinois

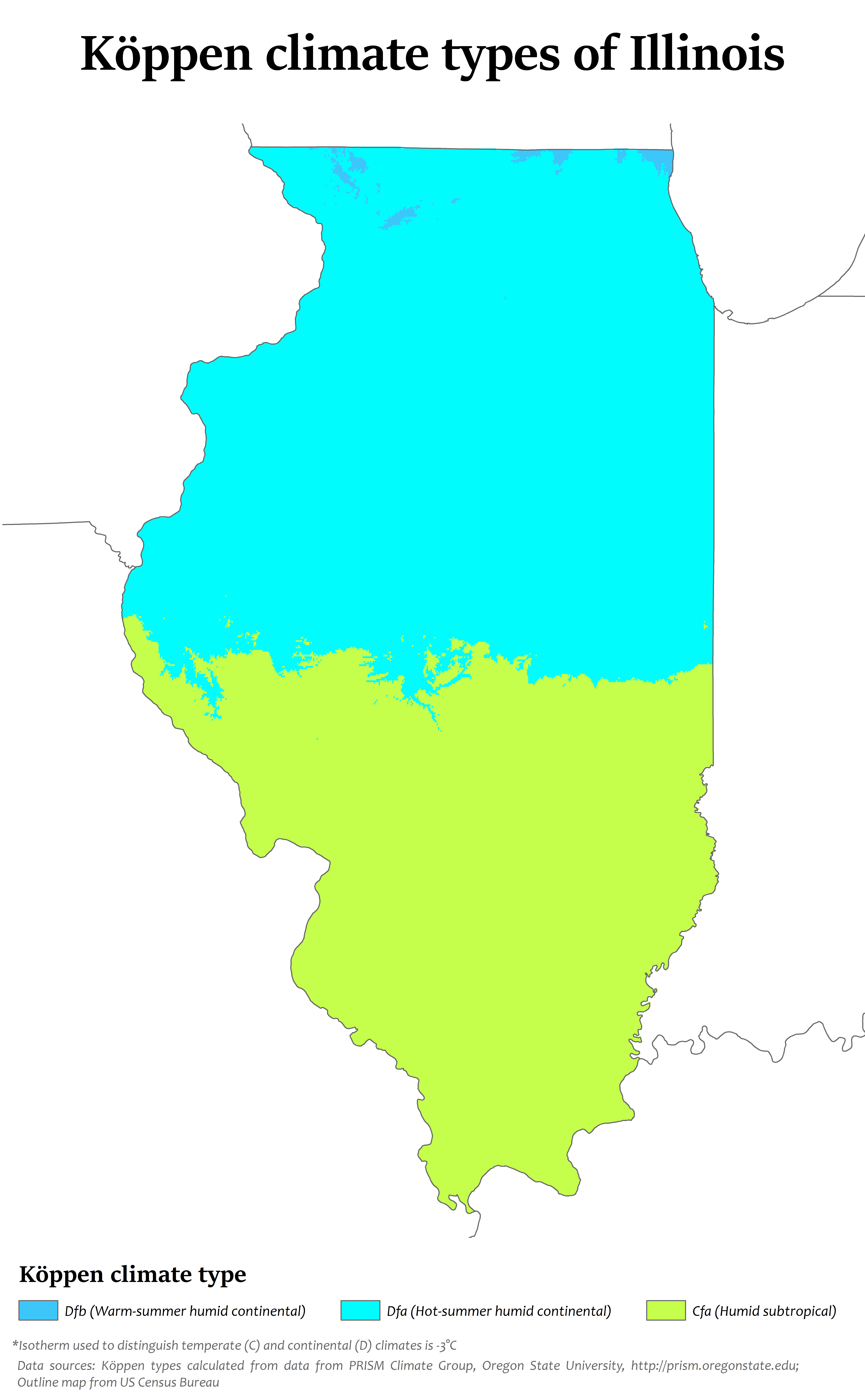
Köppen climate types in Illinois.

Climate change in Illinois encompasses the effects of climate change, attributed to man-made increases in atmospheric carbon dioxide, in the U.S. state of Illinois.

The United States Environmental Protection Agency reports that the climate of Illinois is changing. According to a 2016 report, Illinois is already experiencing the effects of climate change, including warming of approximately one degree Fahrenheit (about 0.6 degrees Celsius), more frequent flooding and later ice formation on the Great Lakes, and earlier melting. This same article notes that in the future, Illinois is likely to experience greater hazards from human-caused climate change, including heaving precipitation and higher flooding, large algae blooms on Lake Michigan, a longer growing season, but higher temperatures, which will offset the benefits of the longer season, higher levels of ground-level ozone, and more days with high temperatures above 95 °F (35 °C).

On January 23, 2019, Governor J.B. Pritzker committed Illinois to joining the United States Climate Alliance. In 2021, the Illinois Legislature passed the Climate and Equitable Jobs Act, which was signed into law by Pritzker on September 15, 2021.

== Changes in Illinois' climate ==
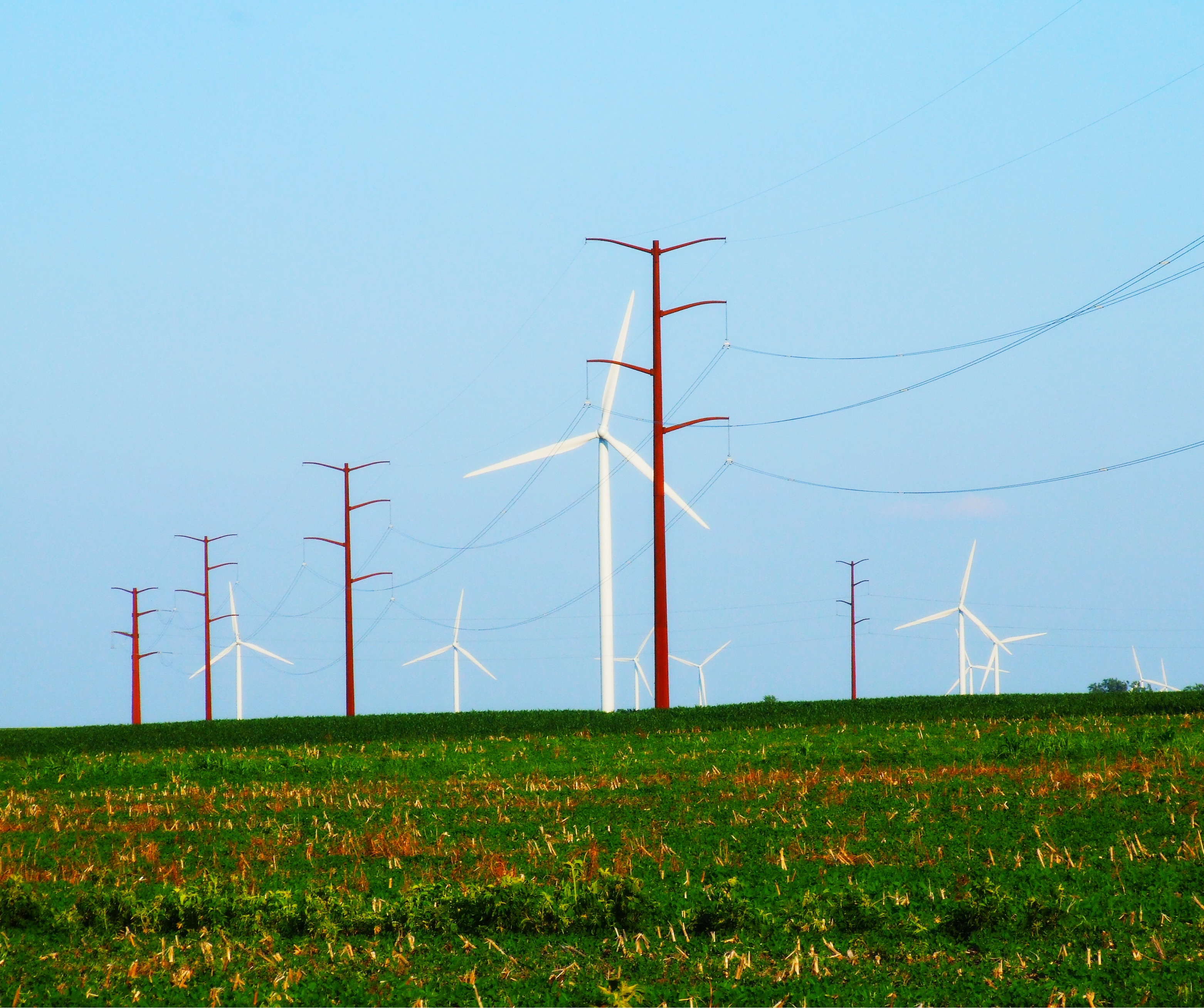
Twin Grove Wind Farm, McLean County

=== Temperature ===
According to a 2021 report from The Nature Conservancy, the average daytime temperature in Illinois has increased by 1 to 2 °F (0.56 to 1.11 °C) over the historical average in the last 100 years. Additionally, the nighttime minimum temperatures are rising at a faster rate than the daytime high temperatures.

=== Precipitation and flooding ===
Illinois has seen a 10-20% increase in annual precipitation over historical averages in the last 100 years. This precipitation increase is happening most in the Fall. Additionally, there has been a 40% increase in the number of days with precipitation of 2 inches (5.1 cm) or more. More frequent heavy precipitation events are a predicted outcome of climate change.

Historically, average snowfall ranges from about 10 inches (25 cm) in southern Illinois to 40 inches (100 cm) in northern Illinois. The change in annual snowfall amounts show no trends at all, with years being higher or lower than average. However, the season when snow is likely to fall has shrunk by about two weeks since the late 1970s.

Flooding events have increased in frequency across all of Illinois' waterways as well, due to higher levels of precipitation. This problem is exacerbated by high rates of urban development and aging sewer infrastructure.

Illinois has seen a decrease in droughts over historical averages, due to higher precipitation levels.

== Projections for climate change in Illinois ==
=== Temperature ===
Temperatures in Illinois are projected to rise over the course of the 21st century. The amount of increase depends on how much humans curtail their CO_{2} emissions. If humans continue to emit at current levels, the increase will be between 8 and 14 °F (4.4 and 7.8 °C). If emissions are lowered, the rise will be between 4 and 9 °F (2.2 and 5.0 °C).

Increased levels of atmospheric carbon dioxide and a longer growing season may benefit crops in the future, but those benefits are likely to be offset by decreased yields. Corn and possibly soy beans, which are two staple crops in Illinois, are likely to experience decreased yields in the future.

Over the historical period of 1910–1960, northern Illinois experienced 1–2 days with temperatures above 95 °F (35 °C). Interestingly, this number will remain steady for the next couple of decades, due to an increase in water vapor in the air. Water has a high specific heat capacity, so will absorb a large amount of heat without raising the air temperature. However, by the end of the 21st century, the number of days seeing temperatures above this threshold is projected to be 25 to 90 if higher emissions continue. Models with lower emissions show an increase to 10 to 60 days by 2090.

=== Precipitation and flooding ===
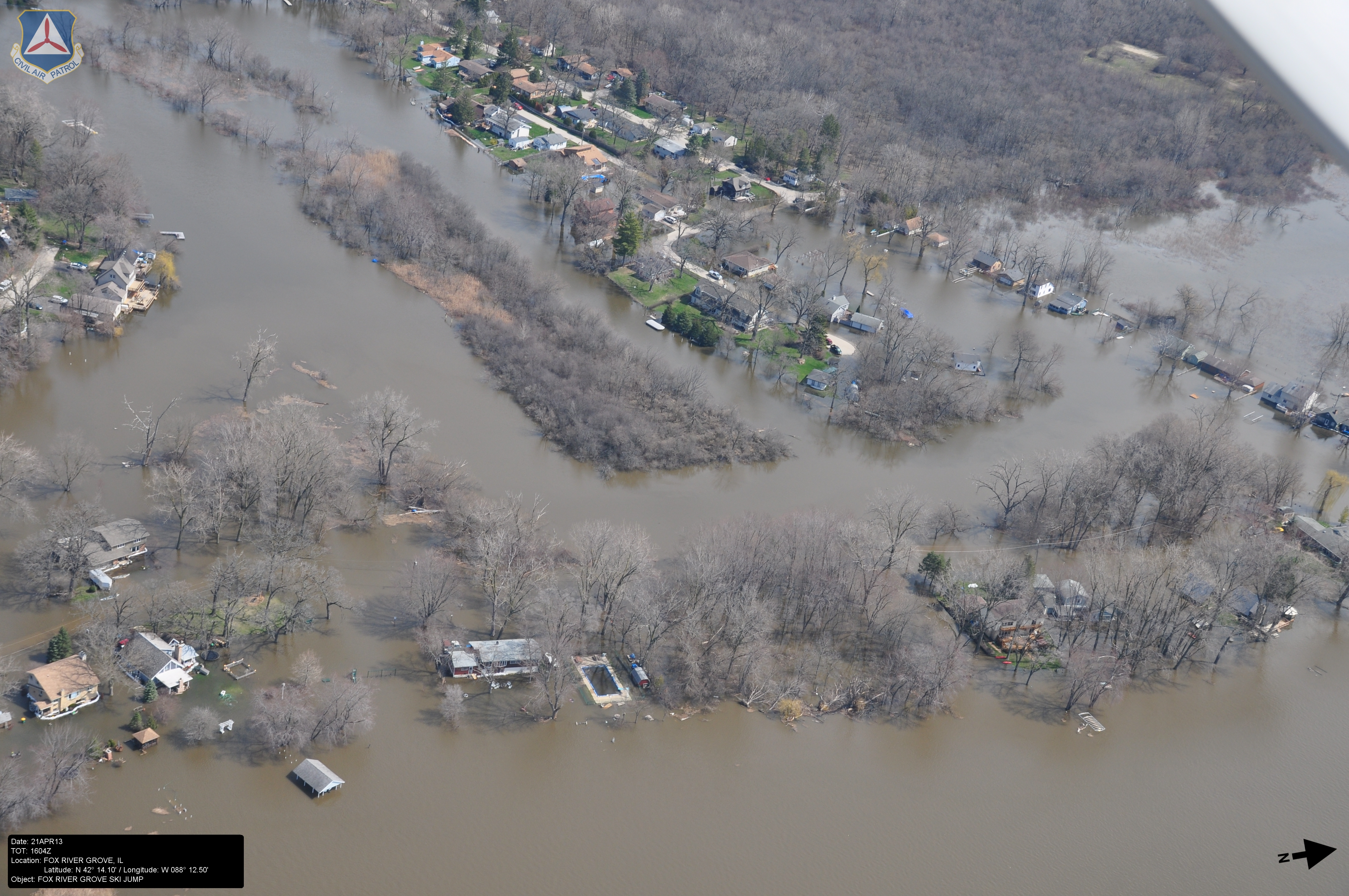
Flooding, Fox River Grove, 2013 floods

Between the years of 1999 and 2019, northern Illinois received on average 35 inches (89 cm) of rainfall. Under high emissions scenarios, that level is projected to increase to up to 42 inches. Low emissions scenarios limit the increase to 40 inches. In central Illinois, rainfall is expected to increase from 37 inches a year to 42 or 45 inches under low or high emissions scenarios, respectively. Southern Illinois is expected to see an increase from 43 inches currently to 48 or 52 under the different emissions scenarios. Precipitation is expected to fall in the summer across the entire state, while it will increase in Spring. The decrease in summer precipitation is expected to increase droughts in those months, impacting crop yields. Additionally, drought can narrow navigation channels on the Mississippi River, Illinois River and Ohio River. The Army Corps of Engineers estimates that a drought in 2012 cost the region $275 million.

Surface water will also increase in temperature leading to more algae blooms, which decrease water quality. An increase in flooding will also increase algae blooms, since urban and rural fertilizer runoff feeds algae. This is especially important in the Great Lakes, as they represent a significant fresh water supply for millions of people in the United States and Canada.

Flooding will also cause damage to cropland and infrastructure around the rivers in Illinois. A flood in Illinois in 2011 closed the Mississippi and Ohio waterways. Flooding from this incident caused an estimated $360 million to damage in croplands and infrastructure.

== Impacts on human health ==
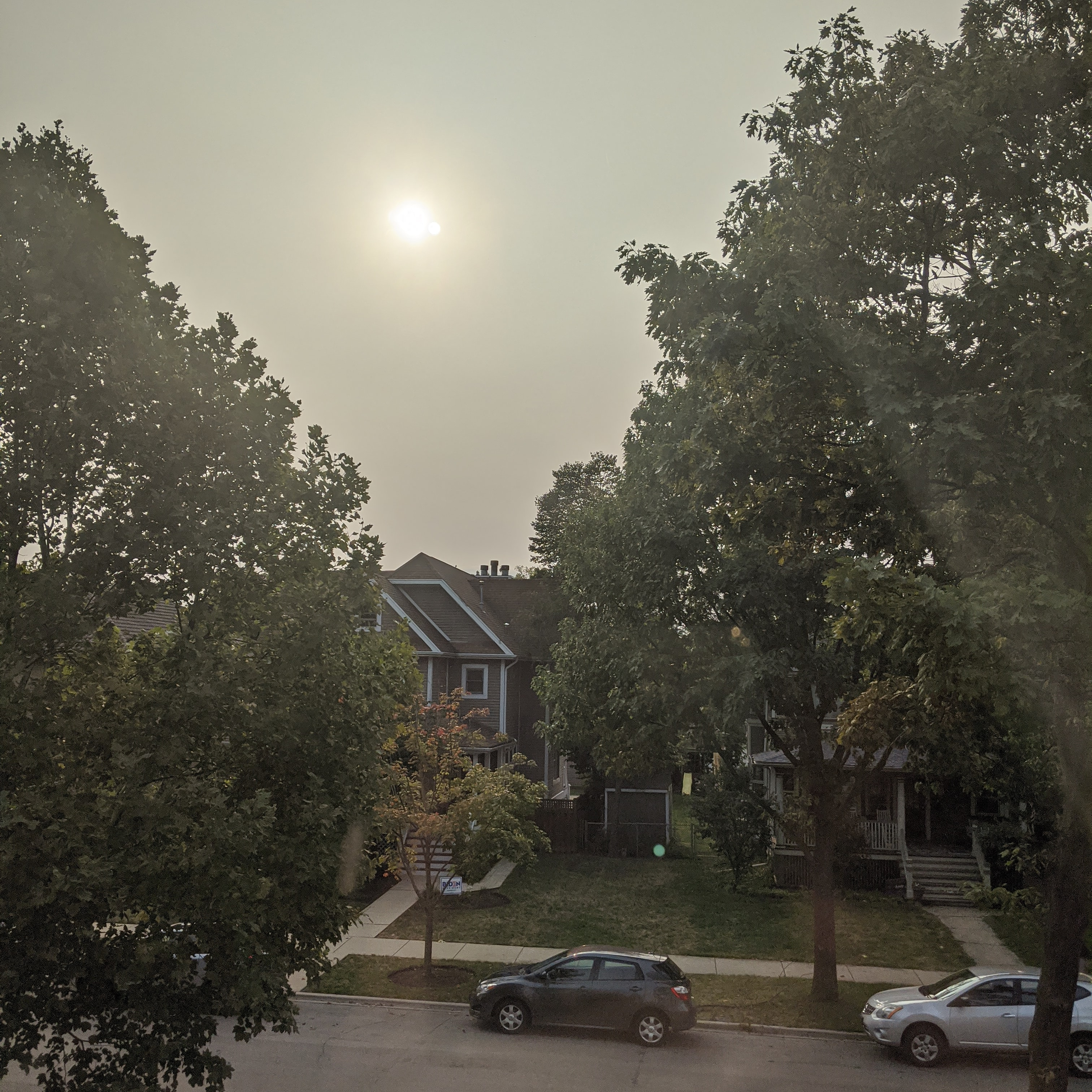
Wildfire smoke, 2020 wildfire season, Oak Park

=== Temperature ===
Higher temperatures will yield more heat waves like the 1995 Chicago heat wave. According to the National Weather Service, heat is a leading contributor to weather-related deaths. Increases in temperature are especially dangerous in cities like Chicago, which experience the urban heat island effect. Future heat waves will yield similar results to the 1995 heat wave, resulting in many deaths. These deaths will happen more frequently to the elderly and those with low incomes, because they typically have less access to air conditioning and a higher rate of health issues like asthma.

Higher air temperatures also lead to higher levels of ground-level ozone and fine particles suspended in the air. These types of particles trigger asthma attacks. Additionally, changing climate in Illinois will change the types of allergens that are present in the air. It has also been shown to lengthen the season for some common allergens, like ragweed.

=== Precipitation and flooding ===
Flooding events in areas with combined municipal sewer systems cause raw sewage to flow into surface water. This can lead to an uptick in diarrhea in children. It can also lead to higher numbers of mosquitos, which carry illnesses such as West Nile Virus.

== Efforts to Mitigate Climate Change in Illinois ==
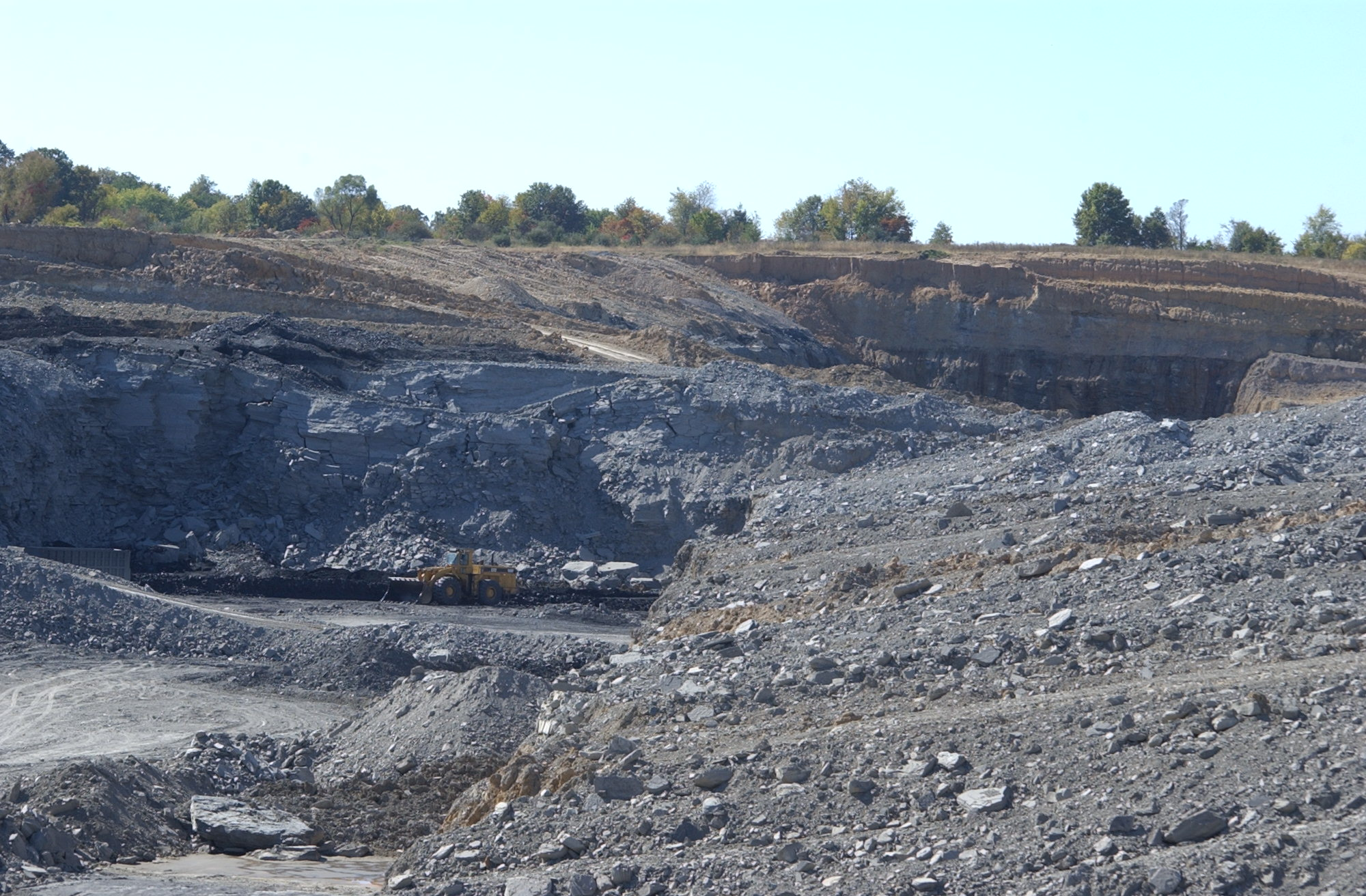
Coal mine remediation near Pinckneyville

=== Climate and Equitable Jobs Act ===
On September 15, 2021, Governor J.B. Pritzker signed the Climate and Equitable Jobs Act, which takes the following actions to decrease Illinois' contributions to human-caused climate change:

- Transitions Illinois' power production to 100% clean energy by requiring 40% of all power to come from renewable resources and all remaining fossil fuel power plants be carbon neutral by 2050
- Encourages development of Illinois' green energy job sector and invests money in retraining programs for workers who are impacted by the switch away from fossil fuels
- Puts in place new consumer protection laws regarding utilities
- Incentivizes the transition to widespread use of electric vehicles
- Expands ethic laws for utilities and politicians
- Changes how utilities can charge for electricity

=== Mitigating Chicago's urban heat island ===
The Chicago Region Trees Initiative has worked to mitigate the urban heat island effect in Chicago and the surrounding suburbs. This effort has included mapping the urban heat island and identifying which areas need to increase local tree coverage.

== See also ==
- List of U.S. states and territories by carbon dioxide emissions
- Plug-in electric vehicles in Illinois
