= Office of the Illinois State's Attorneys Appellate Prosecutor =

Illinois state agency

Illinois State’s Attorneys Appellate Prosecutor
Agency overview
- Jurisdiction: State of Illinois
- Headquarters: Springfield, Illinois
- Agency executive: Patrick Delfino, Director
- Website: https://www.ilsaap.org/index.asp

The Office of the Illinois State's Attorneys Appellate Prosecutor (ILSAAP) is a State agency that organizes a corps of experienced trial attorneys who assist in the prosecutions of criminal cases, especially on the appellate level.

== Description ==
The ILSAAP, a judicial agency of the State of Illinois, is an office of persons, centering on licensed trial attorneys, who are available to assist in or carry out the prosecutions of criminal cases. The elected county prosecutors of Illinois, who are called “state’s attorneys,” can request assistance from ILSAAP at any time. In addition, the Illinois Supreme Court, the appellate courts, or the circuit courts, depending on jurisdiction, may appoint ILSAAP to prosecute a case.

To carry out these duties in the appellate courts of the state, the Office has district offices in four of the five non-Chicago-area appellate court districts of Illinois – Elgin, Mt. Vernon, Ottawa, and Springfield. The ILSAAP administrative office is located in Springfield, the state capital.

ILSAAP is active in 96 of the 102 counties of Illinois. By tradition and inclination, the state's attorneys offices of the counties immediately surrounding Chicago handle their own cases. The Office of the Illinois State's Attorneys Appellate Prosecutor is created by the State's Attorneys Appellate Prosecutor's Act. The Act is current Illinois state law in the Illinois Compiled Statutes, 725 ILCS 210. In cases where questions have been asked about an Illinois law enforcement team and the prosecutor of jurisdiction has day-to-day ties with that law enforcement team, ILSAAP may be asked to conduct an independent review. For example, after two inmates died in a jail in Iroquois County, Illinois, ILSAAP was asked to review the case.

== See also ==
- Office of the Illinois State Appellate Defender
