= Illinois Environmental Protection Agency =

U.S. state government agency

Logo of the Illinois Environmental Protection Agency.

The Illinois Environmental Protection Agency (Illinois EPA) of the state of Illinois is the primary body concerned with the protection of the environment for the state. The Illinois EPA's mission is "to safeguard environmental quality, consistent with the social and economic needs of the State, so as to protect health, welfare, property and the quality of life."

Its stated goals are to:

- Provide leadership to chart a new course for clean air which is responsive to relevant needs in Illinois and complies with priority aspects of the Clean Air Act Amendments.
- Address outstanding solid and hazardous waste management concerns and participate, as appropriate, in the national deliberations on reauthorization of the hazardous waste program.
- Utilize creative means to address the priority needs for clean and safe water in Illinois and participate, as appropriate, in the national deliberations on reauthorization of the water programs.
- Enhance capability to fund environmental cleanup, when necessary, and to provide better service for private party actions.
- Promote pollution prevention and market-based approaches for continued environmental progress.
- Develop an environmental planning capability which emphasizes risk-based analysis, good science and sound data, and open communication and informed participation.

The current director of the Illinois EPA is James Jennings.

== History ==
The Illinois EPA was established in July 1970, shortly after the first Earth Day. Governor Richard Ogilvie signed into law the Illinois Environmental Protection Act (PA 76-2429), which became effective on July 1, 1970, and created the Illinois EPA. Illinois was the first US state with a comprehensive environmental protection act. This was the same year that the United States Environmental Protection Agency was created.

== Structure ==
The agency's headquarters is located in Springfield, with a laboratory in Springfield, and field offices centered in Champaign, Marion, Elgin, Rockford, Moline, Des Plaines, Collinsville, and Peoria. The Illinois EPA is composed of three main Bureaus:

- Bureau of Air
  - Division of Air Pollution Control - "to improve air quality by identifying air pollution problems, proposing appropriate regulations to control or reduce air contaminants, conducting inspections and reviewing permit applications to assure compliance with existing air pollution regulations"
  - Division of Mobil Source Programs - "to enforce vehicle emission limitations"
- Bureau of Land
  - Division of Land Pollution Control - "to ensure that hazardous and nonhazardous wastes are managed in an environmentally sound manner and to implement regulatory programs such as the Resource Conservation and Recovery Act (RCRA) and the Solid Waste program"
  - Division of Remediation Management - "for administering cleanup programs for hazardous waste sites (including Superfund), leaking underground storage tanks, and used tires"
- Bureau of Water
  - Division of Water Pollution Control - "to identify sources of water pollution and implement steps to abate the pollution"
  - Division of Public Water Supply - "to protect the public from disease and to assure an adequate supply of pure water for all beneficial uses"

There are also offices designed to assist both industry and the public in the areas of pollution prevention, community relations, and environmental justice.

== See also ==
- Climate change in Illinois
- List of ecoregions of Illinois
