= Plug-in electric vehicles in Illinois =

As of October 2021, there were about 33,000 electric vehicles in Illinois.

== Government policy ==
As of October 2021, the state government's official policy goal is to have 1 million electric vehicles in Illinois by 2030.

In July 2022, the state government started issuing tax rebates of $4,000 for electric vehicle purchases. This amount will drop to $2,500 in 2026 and $1,000 in 2028.

As of October 2022, the state government charges an annual registration fee of $251 for electric cars, compared with $151 for gasoline-powered cars.

Politicians who have led the effort to implement these fees have been found to have received significant funding from the oil and gas industry. In addition, organizations funded by the oil and gas industry, such as ALEC, are actively pushing for fee increases.

In March 2022, Tesla, Inc. was sued in state court in regards to their cars' facial recognition technology and whether it violated state privacy laws.

== Charging stations ==
As of February 2022, Illinois has around 900 charging stations.

In January 2022, lawmakers in the state legislature introduced a bill that would require all new buildings in the state to designate parking spaces for electric vehicle charging.

== Manufacturing ==
According to Governor J. B. Pritzker, Illinois is "one of the most attractive [locations] in the country" for electric vehicle manufacturing. In November 2021, Pritzker signed the Reimagining Electric Vehicles in Illinois (REV) Act, which provides tax credits for electric vehicle manufacturers.

== By region ==
=== Bloomington–Normal ===
Bloomington–Normal is widely considered to be a potential hub for electric vehicle manufacturing. In 2017, Rivian opened the state's largest manufacturing plant in Normal. The plant has a planned production capacity of 150,000 vehicles per year, but as of April 2022, it was only producing 25,000.

In 2021, Heartland Community College introduced a training program for electric vehicle manufacturing at its campus in Normal.

=== Champaign–Urbana ===
As of October 2021, there were 220 electric vehicles registered in Champaign.

=== Chicago ===
As of October 2021, there were about 6,000 electric vehicles in Chicago, 1,500 in Naperville, 500 in Aurora, 260 in Elgin, and 120 in Joliet.

As of February 2022, there were about 220 public charging stations in Chicago, and about 600 in the Chicago metropolitan area.

In April 2020, the Chicago City Council passed an ordinance requiring all new residential buildings constructed with at least 30 parking spaces to have 20% of parking spaces be dedicated to electric vehicle charging.

There have been concerns about racial inequality with regards to the prevalence of charging stations in Chicago.

=== Peoria ===
As of October 2021, there were 205 electric vehicles registered in Peoria.

=== Rockford ===
As of 2020, there were about 5,000 electric vehicles registered in the Rockford metropolitan area.

=== Springfield ===
As of June 2022, there were 420 electric vehicles registered in Sangamon County.
