= Illinois Independent Tax Tribunal =

Illinois state agency

Agency overview
- Formed: 2012
- Jurisdiction: State of Illinois
- Website: https://taxtribunal.illinois.gov/tax-tribunal-act.html

The Illinois Independent Tax Tribunal (IITA) is an independent State of Illinois agency that creates a forum of original jurisdiction for the initial appeal of back-tax determinations made by the Illinois Department of Revenue (IDOR), the chief tax-collecting agency of Illinois.

== Description ==
Created in 2012, the Tribunal is an administrative law forum of original jurisdiction for the adjudication of cases that involve determinations made by the Illinois Department of Revenue. These determinations may include notices of tax liability, and many of the cases heard by the Tribunal are appeals launched by taxpayers. There is a filing fee. The Tribunal is made up of from 1 to 4 administrative law judges, of whom one serves as Chief Judge. The Tribunal sits in both Chicago, the largest city of Illinois, and Springfield, the state capital. Decisions of the Tribunal are subject to judicial review.

The Tribunal exists and draws its authority from a law enacted by the Illinois General Assembly. The Tribunal's basic law is cited as 35 ILCS 1010.

== See also ==
- United States Tax Court
