= Illinois Guardianship and Advocacy Commission =

Illinois state agency

Agency overview
- Formed: 1979
- Jurisdiction: State of Illinois
- Headquarters: Chicago, Illinois
- Website: https://www2.illinois.gov/sites/gac/Pages/default.aspx

The Illinois Guardianship and Advocacy Commission (IGAC) is a quasi-independent State of Illinois agency that serves as a public-sector advocate for persons with disabilities.

== Description ==
The IGAC derives its standing from the Guardianship and Advocacy Act, enacted in 1978. Advocates in the 1970s had pointed out the existence of many Illinois residents who needed a legal guardian and had none. Under the English common law, it had been assumed that persons requiring guardianship would be taken care of by their extended families. Even if this had ever been true, by the 1970s it was no longer valid. As of 2022, the Commission provides legal representation, investigates complaints of rights violations, and provides state guardianship for Illinois' population with disabilities.

Although the commission is a quasi-independent panel, it is a fully-staffed, taxpayer-funded State of Illinois agency. The IGAC, as of 2022, has nine regional offices; they are located in Chicago (one office), the Chicago suburbs (two offices), and in Downstate Illinois (6 offices). A board of eleven Commissioners, who serve without compensation, govern the agency.
