= Illinois Department of Innovation and Technology =

State agency in Illinois, United States

Department overview
- Jurisdiction: Illinois
- Headquarters: 120 W. Jefferson St. Springfield, Illinois
- Website: https://doit.illinois.gov/

The Illinois Department of Innovation and Technology (DoIT) is an agency of the Illinois state government that operates and maintains the IT infrastructure, telecommunications, software development, and web development of the state. The department was created by executive order of former Governor Bruce Rauner in July 2016, and its existence and operations were made official by statutory law in July 2018.

DoIT's headquarters is located at 120 W. Jefferson St., Springfield, IL. The Chicago office is located at 555 Monroe St., Chicago, IL.
