= Illinois Municipal Retirement Fund =

U.S. state public pension system

Agency overview
- Formed: 1941
- Headquarters: Oak Brook, IL
- Employees: 239
- Agency executives: Brian Collins, Executive Director; Gwen Henry, 2025 Board of Trustees President
- Website: www.imrf.org

The Illinois Municipal Retirement Fund (or IMRF) is the second largest and best-funded public pension system in Illinois. Since 1941, has partnered with local units of government to provide retirement, disability and death benefits for public employees. With a funded status of about 95.8 percent and more than $55 billion in assets, IMRF is well-funded and sustainable.

Today, IMRF has more than 520,000 members and serves more than 3,050 different units of government, including towns and villages, libraries and park districts, and counties and school districts (non-teaching personnel). The typical IMRF retiree receives a modest and sustainable benefit, earned after decades of public service. In 2024, 50% of retirees received a benefit of less than $12,000 annually.

In 2019, IMRF became the first public pension fund in the nation to receive a Malcolm Baldrige National Quality Award for Performance Excellence. This Presidential-level honor recognizes exemplary U.S. organizations and businesses. In 2017, IMRF received an Illinois Performance Excellence (ILPEx)] Gold Award for Achievement of Excellence. IMRF is governed by an elected board of trustees. IMRF is administered by a staff of 239 professionals, led by Executive Director Brian Collins.

== Mission statement ==
"To efficiently and impartially develop, implement, and administer in a prudent manner programs that provide income protection to members and their beneficiaries on behalf of participating employers."

== Plan structure and current administration ==
=== Board of trustees ===
IMRF is established under statutes adopted by the Illinois General Assembly. It is governed by a fully elected board of eight trustees. Four trustees are elected by employers, three are elected by participating members, and one annuitant trustee is elected by IMRF retirees. The Board appoints an Executive Director who is responsible for all administrative functions and supervision of staff employees.

=== Plan structure ===
IMRF is a defined benefit retirement plan that provides retirement, survivor, disability, and death benefits to municipal government employees in Illinois. It is governed by Article 7 of the Illinois Pension Code. Eligible employees are automatically enrolled in IMRF when employment begins.

About 98% of IMRF's membership participates in the Regular Plan. IMRF administers a separate plan for Sheriffs' Law Enforcement Personnel (SLEP).

Members participate as either Tier 1 or Tier 2 members. To participate as a Tier 1 member, the employee must have started work with an IMRF employer on or before December 31, 2010. All other members participate in Tier 2. All IMRF Tier 2 plans have a less generous benefit structure as compared to Tier 1. The cost to provide a Tier 2 pension is more than 40% less than the cost of providing a Tier 1 pension. In 2024, more than half of IMRF members participate in Tier 2.

== IMRF history ==
=== How IMRF was founded ===
The 61st General Assembly of the State of Illinois created IMRF, effective July 29, 1939. The first meeting of the IMRF board was held on September 8, 1939, in the office of the Municipal Public Utility annuity and benefit fund at 135 S. LaSalle St. in Chicago.

=== Five original employers enroll ===
IMRF began operation on January 1, 1941, with five original employers, City of Evanston, City of Galesburg, Village of Riverside, Rockford Park District and City of Rockford. The first benefit awards were approved at the March 1941 board meeting. At that same meeting, the board approved IMRF's first investment, a $5,000 Treasury bond at 2½ percent due on March 15 of 1952 or 1954, with the assumption that 1952 was an option year.

=== Additional groups covered ===
In 1947, the Illinois legislature required the IMRF staff to participate as members of the system. Later in that same year, the Illinois legislature mandated participation by all Illinois school districts (except those located in the city of Chicago) and all their employees except those covered by the Teachers' Retirement System of the State of Illinois. Coverage of schools increased the number of employers in IMRF from 156 to 652 and the number of members from 11,171 to 17,119.

Effective January 1, 1951, all cities, villages, and incorporated towns with populations of 10,000 or more and all counties (except Cook County) and sanitary districts (except Metropolitan Chicago Sanitary District) were mandated by legislation into IMRF.

In 1955, an Illinois Supreme Court decision ruled that IMRF statutes provided an option for municipalities to enter, but none to exit.

=== Retirement Systems Reciprocal Act ===
In 1955, IMRF was included in the Retirement Systems Reciprocal Act, a provision of the statutes which allows total service with any of several public pension systems in Illinois to be considered when determining an annuity.
