= Illinois Property Tax Appeal Board =

Illinois state agency

Agency overview
- Formed: 1967
- Jurisdiction: State of Illinois
- Headquarters: Springfield, Illinois
- Website: www.ptab.illinois.gov

The Illinois Property Tax Appeal Board (PTAB) is an Illinois agency that serves as a final administrative panel of appeal for statewide appellants in property tax assessment cases.

== Description ==
The PTAB is a quasi-judicial body that hears from both taxpayers and taxing bodies. These parties, with their disparate points of view, share a common interest in maintaining access to an administrative panel that can hear their appeals of property tax assessments.

Founded in 1967, the PTAB was originally a panel of final administrative appeal for property tax assessment cases from the 101 counties of Illinois other than Cook County, Illinois's largest county in terms of population and property value. In 1997, the Illinois General Assembly expanded PTAB's jurisdictions to cover Cook County. PTAB, by statute, has no jurisdiction over property tax exemptions, extensions, or rates per dollar of equalized assessed value; its jurisdiction is limited to assessments only.
