= Office of the Illinois State Appellate Defender =

Illinois state agency

Illinois State Appellate Defender
Agency overview
- Jurisdiction: State of Illinois
- Headquarters: Springfield, Illinois
- Agency executive: James E. Chadd, State Appellate Defender
- Website: https://www2.illinois.gov/osad/Pages/default.aspx

The Office of the Illinois State Appellate Defender (OSAD) is a State agency that represents indigent persons on appeal in criminal cases.

== Description ==
The OSAD is an office of persons, including persons licensed to practice law, who can represent indigent defendants on appeal. The Illinois Supreme Court, the appellate courts, or the circuit courts may appoint attorneys from OSAD to represent these defendants.

To carry out these duties in the appellate courts of the state, the Office has district offices in each of the five appellate court districts of Illinois – Chicago, Elgin, Mt. Vernon, Ottawa, and Springfield. The OSAD administrative office is located in Springfield, the state capital.

The Office of the Illinois State Appellate Defender is created by the State Appellate Defender Act. The Act is current Illinois state law in the Illinois Compiled Statutes, 725 ILCS 105.

== Honors ==
In 1986, the American Bar Association honored OSAD as the outstanding public defender office of the United States.

== Current events ==
The Office of the Illinois State Appellate Defender came under severe criticism in the late 2010s for the lengthy queue required for clients - most of them persons convicted of felonies and subject to imprisonment - to get their cases actively taken up by OSAD. As one point, OSAD had more than 3,759 cases under advisement. In March 2022, the Office told a legislative committee that this backlog had been reduced to fewer than 500 cases.

== See also ==
- Office of the Illinois State's Attorneys Appellate Prosecutor
