= Illinois Department of Human Services =

State agency in Illinois, United States

Department of Human Services
Department overview
- Jurisdiction: Illinois
- Department executive: Dulce M. Quintero, Secretary of Human Services
- Website: www.dhs.state.il.us

The Illinois Department of Human Services (IDHS) is a department of the Illinois state government responsible for providing a wide variety of safety net services to Illinois residents in poverty, who are facing other economic challenges, or who have any of a variety of disabilities. As of 2006, it was the largest administrative agency of the state of Illinois in terms of state employee headcount, with 14,057 employees.

== Structure ==
The following subdepartments are listed alphabetically:

- The Division of Community Health & Prevention attempts to maintain the health of existing family structures in Illinois by staffing efforts to contain domestic violence and maximize prenatal care and child care and welfare.
- The Division of Developmental Disabilities provides community and residential services to persons with developmental disabilities. In 2006, the division had approximately 45,000 clients.
- The Division of Human Capital Development is the primary welfare agency of the state of Illinois. It oversees programs such as TANF and food stamps.
- The Division of Mental Health provides community and residential services to persons with challenges of mental health.

It also includes:

- The Office of Alcoholism & Substance Abuse provides community care for persons with challenges related to alcoholism and substance abuse.
- The Office of Strategic Planning and Performance Management coordinates divisional program planning and performance management.
- The Office of Security and Emergency Preparedness ensures the safety and readiness of the agency's facilities, staff, customers and visitors
- The Office of Rehabilitation Services provides community services to persons with disabilities. In 2006, the Office had approximately 230,000 clients.
