= Illinois Liquor Control Commission =

The Liquor Control Commission is an Illinois state government commission, with four divisions.

The Licensing Division is responsible for reviewing state liquor applications and issuing new and renewal state liquor licenses. There are 28 different license categories - including airplanes, trains, liquor stores, non-beverage users, out-of-state distributors, special events, non-resident dealers, national and foreign licensing, and brand registration.

The Investigations Division utilizes Special Agents to conduct inspections at ILCC-licensed entities throughout Illinois, to plan and execute underage compliance details, to conduct investigations concerning complaints against licensed entities, and to coordinate and cooperate with local, state and federal law enforcement agencies.

The Legal Division is responsible for counseling the Commissioners and the Executive Director on interpretations of the Illinois Liquor Control Act and its Rules and Regulations. The Division reviews all violations to weigh the severity of the offenses. Minor offenses are handled quickly through an administrative review process, similar to paying parking tickets. When necessary, the Division holds predisciplinary conferences with licensees. More serious violations are reviewed by a staff attorney and a citation is prepared for formal hearing before the Commissioners.

The Industry Education Division is responsible for educating the liquor industry regarding the laws that govern liquor sales throughout the state. This division makes available a variety of educational publications including, newsletters, booklets, flyers, news releases, signs and a Commission website.
