= Teachers' Retirement System of the State of Illinois =

State agency in Illinois, United States

Teachers' Retirement System of the State of Illinois (TRS)

Agency overview
- Formed: 1939
- Headquarters: Springfield, Illinois
- Agency executives: Stan Rupnik, Executive Director and Chief Investment Officer; Matthew Hunt, President, Board of Trustees
- Website: www.trsil.org

The Teachers' Retirement System of the State of Illinois is an American state government agency dealing with pensions and other financial benefits for teachers and other workers in education in Illinois.

== Purpose ==
The Illinois General Assembly created the Teachers’ Retirement System of the State of Illinois (TRS, or the System) in 1939 for the purpose of providing retirement annuities, and disability and survivor benefits for educators employed in public schools outside the city of Chicago. The System's enabling legislation is in the Illinois Pension Code at 40 ILCS 5/16-101.

== Membership ==
TRS members fall into the following categories: active, inactive, annuitant, and beneficiary.

Active members are Illinois public school personnel who work full-time, part-time, or as substitutes, employed outside the city of Chicago in positions requiring licensure by the Illinois State Board of Education. Persons who are employed in certain state agencies and statewide or national organizations related to education are also active TRS members. As of June 30, 2021, there were 159,027 active members.

Inactive members are no longer contributing to the System but have service credit that will entitle them to draw a benefit or refund when statutory eligibility requirements are met. As of June 30, 2021, there were 145,769 inactive members.

Annuitants are persons receiving a retirement annuity or disability retirement annuity. Beneficiaries are persons receiving a survivor benefit or reversionary annuity. As of June 30, 2021, there were 127,518 annuitants and beneficiaries.

== Benefits ==
Subject to various qualification requirements, members and annuitants of TRS may be eligible for a range of benefits, including retirement annuity, death benefits, disability benefits, and post-retirement health insurance.

== Funding ==
TRS is funded by member contributions, investment income, employer contributions, and appropriations from the Illinois state government.

== Creation of Tier II ==
Public Act 96–0889, which was signed into law in the spring of 2010, adds a new section to the Pension Code that applies different benefits to anyone who first contributes to TRS on or after January 1, 2011, and does not have previous service credit with a pension system that has reciprocal rights with TRS. These members are referred to as “Tier II” members.

Changes from the “Tier I” pension law include raising the minimum eligibility to draw a retirement benefit to age 67 with 10 years of service, initiating a cap on the salaries used to calculate retirement benefits, and limiting cost-of-living annuity adjustments to the lesser of 3 percent or half of the annual increase in the Consumer Price Index, not compounded. The retirement formula is unchanged. The new pension law does not apply to anyone who has TRS service prior to January 1, 2011. These members remain participants of Tier I.

== See also ==
- Chicago Teachers' Federation
- Chicago Teachers Union
- Education in Illinois
- Illinois pension crisis
- Illinois Public Pension Amendment
- Public employee pension plans in the United States
- State Universities Retirement System, the comparable system for state higher education in Illinois
