= Illinois Racing Board =

Illinois state agency

Agency overview
- Formed: 1933
- Jurisdiction: State of Illinois
- Headquarters: Chicago, Illinois
- Agency executive: Daniel Beiser, Chairman
- Website: https://www2.illinois.gov/sites/irb/Pages/default.aspx

The Illinois Racing Board (IRB) is a quasi-independent State of Illinois agency that oversees and regulates the Illinois horse racing industry, including tracks that hold race meetings where wagers can be placed.

== Description ==
As of 2021, the ICJIA derives its mission statement from the Illinois Horse Racing Act of 1975. The Board enjoys jurisdiction, supervision, powers, and duties over every person who holds or conducts any race meeting within the state of Illinois where horse racing is permitted for any stake, purse, or reward. Toward this end, the Board enforces rules and regulations to ensure the honesty and integrity of Illinois horse racing and wagering. As of 2021 with the closing of Arlington Park and a preliminary agreement leading to a future sale of the former track property to the Chicago Bears, two horse racetracks remain in operation in Illinois:

- Fairmount Park Racetrack
- Hawthorne Race Course

Hawthorne is located in the western suburbs of Chicago. Fairmount is located in Downstate Illinois, near St. Louis. Both courses host thoroughbred race meetings between horses ridden by jockeys. During the race meetings, both the horses and the jockeys are under the Board's supervision. Hawthorne also hosts a meeting of harness racing between standardbred horses that pull drivers in light carts. The Board supervises the horses, carts, and drivers.

The Racing Board approves times and dates for the race meetings. In a typical season, the Chicago-area race meeting schedule is set up. For example in the past, when Arlington was racing thoroughbreds, Hawthorne would hold harness racing. The race meeting schedules are posed on each track's website and on the website of the Racing Board. Subsidiary race meetings, typically between harness horses, are held at the Illinois State Fairgrounds Racetrack, the DuQuoin State Fair, and at several of the county fairs of Illinois.

The Illinois Racing Board was founded in 1933.

== Ethics violations ==
Illinois state law prohibits the board's members from engaging in political activity. Several commissioners have been found in violation of this law over the course of the board's history, or have resigned to evade legal action.

In 2020, chairman Jeffrey Brincat, and commissioners Greg Sronce and Edgar Ramirez, all resigned due to prohibited activity. Brincat made donations to a state legislator, Antonio Munoz, and a candidate for local office in Lake County. Ramirez, meanwhile, donated to Michael Rodriguez, a Chicago alderman, and Sronce donated to the Sangamon County Republican Party and Kentucky U.S. Senator Mitch McConnell.
