= Illinois Freedom of Information Act =

Public records law in Illinois

Freedom of Information Act

83rd Illinois General Assembly
- Citation: 5 ILCS 140/1 et seq. Public Act 83-1013
- Passed: June 28, 1983
- Signed by: Governor James R. Thompson (after amendatory veto agreed to by the General Assembly)
- Signed: December 27, 1983
- Effective: July 1, 1984

Legislative history
- Bill title: House Bill 234
- Introduced by: Barbara Flynn Currie (House); Terry L. Bruce (Senate)

Amended by
- Public Act 96-542 (effective January 1, 2010)

Related legislation
- State Records Act; Local Records Act; Open Meetings Act
- Status: Amended

The Illinois Freedom of Information Act (FOIA /ˈfɔɪjə/ FOY-yə), 5 ILCS 140/1 et seq., is an Illinois statute that grants to all persons the right to copy and inspect public records in the state. The law applies to executive and legislative bodies of state government, units of local government, and other entities defined as "public bodies". All records related to governmental business are presumed to be open for inspection by the public, except for information specifically exempted from disclosure by law. The statute is modeled after the federal Freedom of Information Act and serves a similar purpose as freedom of information legislation in the other U.S. states.

Once a person submits a request to inspect public records, the public body is required to respond within deadlines specified by FOIA. Under certain circumstances, the public body may charge fees for providing the records. Public bodies may deny access to certain types of information, such as invasions of personal privacy, preliminary drafts and other pre-decisional materials, and other types of information specifically enumerated by FOIA and other statutes. When a FOIA request is denied, requesters may file suit in the circuit courts, and potentially recover attorney's fees if they prevail in the litigation. Requesters may also appeal to the Public Access Counselor (PAC), which issues binding opinions on rare occasions, typically opting to resolve disputes through non-binding opinions or other informal means.

Illinois was the last state in the United States to enact freedom of information legislation. Before FOIA became effective, statutes granted limited access to records held by certain officials or governmental bodies, and courts recognized the public's right to access other records, subject to limitations established through common law. FOIA was first introduced to the General Assembly in 1974, but faced repeated resistance from Democratic lawmakers representing Chicago. FOIA was finally enacted in 1984, after lengthy negotiations between the legislature, executive, and civic organizations lobbying for or against the law. FOIA became the exclusive disclosure statute that filled the gaps left by other statutes, and it expanded the public's right to access information. However, the law was criticized for its weak enforcement provisions, with public bodies facing few incentives to comply. An overhaul of FOIA became effective in 2010, turning the Illinois law into one of the most liberal and comprehensive public records statutes throughout the United States. The new law strengthened FOIA's enforcement provisions and authorized the PAC to resolve disputes.

== Purpose ==
We are not surprised that governmental entities ... generally prefer not to reveal their activities to the public. If this were not a truism, no FOIA would be needed. Our legislature enacted the FOIA in recognition that (1) blanket government secrecy does not serve the public interest and (2) transparency should be the norm, except in rare, specified circumstances. The legislature has concluded that the sunshine of public scrutiny is the best antidote to public corruption, and Illinois courts are duty-bound to enforce that policy.

—Appellate Court opinion in Better Government Association v. Blagojevich (2008)

The American understanding of the right to know is based on the First Amendment to the United States Constitution. Freedom of speech depends on freedom to collect information about which to speak, and the Framers of the Constitution recognized the importance of an informed populace to democratic government. The "right to know" is provided not by the Constitution, but rather defined by statutory and common law.

Illinois law has recognized the public's right to access and inspect public records and information about the workings of their government. The courts have also recognized a common law duty to disclose public records, balanced against an individual's right to privacy and the interests of the government. Access to records concerning the use of public funds is guaranteed by the Constitution of Illinois, which provides: "Reports and records of the obligation, receipt and use of public funds of the State, units of local government and school districts are public records available for inspection by the public according to law." This constitutional provision has been implemented through the State Records Act and Local Records Act, (Note: State Records Act (5 ILCS 160/1 et seq.), Local Records Act (50 ILCS 205/1 et seq.)) which require agencies to permit inspection and copying of records related to public funds. Certain statutes have also required specific officials to make their records open to public inspection.

Since the public policy of Illinois has promoted access to public records, the enactment of FOIA did not drastically change the substance of Illinois law. FOIA is significant because it provides a comprehensive statutory statement of longstanding public policy, provides a codified balancing of competing interests recognized by common law, and establishes procedures to promote public inspection of records. The purpose of FOIA is codified in section 1 of the act:

Pursuant to the fundamental philosophy of the American constitutional form of government, it is declared to be the public policy of the State of Illinois that all persons are entitled to full and complete information regarding the affairs of government and the official acts and policies of those who represent them as public officials and public employees ... Such access is necessary to enable the people to fulfill their duties of discussing public issues fully and freely, making informed political judgments and monitoring government to ensure that it is being conducted in the public interest.

However, FOIA further states that it is not intended to cause an invasion of personal privacy, to allow commercial interests to impose a burden on public resources, or to disrupt the other responsibilities of public bodies aside from their duty to provide access to public records.

The Illinois FOIA is modeled on the federal FOIA. The legislature intended that case law interpretations of the federal FOIA guide the Illinois courts in interpreting the state FOIA, though Illinois courts have also noted that the state and federal FOIAs may still be interpreted differently.

== History ==
=== Prior to enactment ===
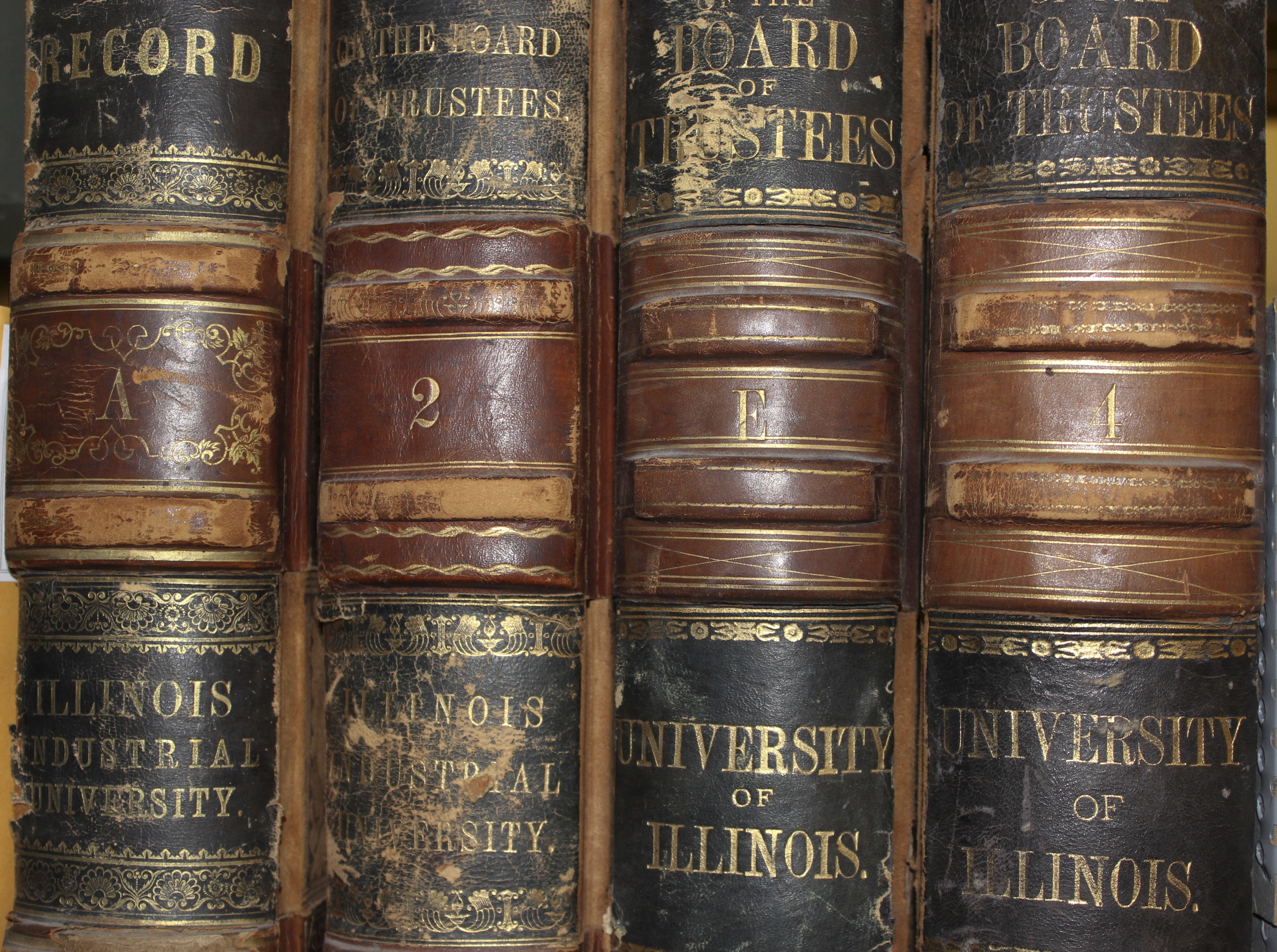
Records of the board of trustees of Illinois Industrial University and its successor, the University of Illinois

The first Illinois statutes concerning public access to records involved county offices. A law enacted in 1887 granted public access to records in the possession of a county recorder, and other statutes granted access to records of a county clerk or board of supervisors. The courts also recognized the legislature's authority to grant access to records in 1867, and the public's right to copy records in 1907. In the following years, the General Assembly began to enact disclosure provisions into various statutes, but such provisions were non-uniform and pertained only to specific agencies. Not all agencies were covered by disclosure requirements, and in those cases where a statute did not apply, the courts came to rely on common law to preserve the public's access to information.

Common law granted taxpaying residents of a village or school district the right to inspect and copy records. However, appellate case law also held that private financial records submitted to a city government by franchise applicants were not public records, as they were private business records that happened to be in the possession of city officials. Under common law, whether a document was considered a public record was based on the purpose of the law that related to that type of document. A record may be considered a public record for one purpose, but not another. Judges also considered whether the requester had an "interest" in what was sought, and whether the record was "required to be kept". Common law was used to balance the public's right to know against competing interests, such as the rights to privacy and due process of the subject of the information, along with the government's ability to conduct its business efficiently and without undue interference. Due to a lack of guidance from the General Assembly, the courts often weighed these factors differently, arriving at inconsistent decisions for each case. Also, the Constitution of Illinois ensures that the financial records of local governments are open to disclosure, but since the Constitution also protects an individual's personal privacy, courts addressing constitutional questions were again faced with the balancing tests similar to common law.

The General Assembly enacted the State Records Act in 1957, and the Local Records Act in 1961. However, neither statute provided general access to records. The State Records Act was primarily concerned with the financial records of the state government. In 1979, the Supreme Court held in Lopez v. Fitzgerald (Note: Lopez v. Fitzgerald, 76 Ill. 2d 107 (1979).) that while the Local Records Act requires the preservation of public records, it does not impose an obligation on agencies to allow access to those records. The ACLU of Illinois reported issues with accessing building inspection reports and draft city ordinances. Exemptions under the State Records Act and Local Records Act were vague, but the laws did provide exemptions against invasions of privacy. Furthermore, common law recognized an exemption for "preliminary documents", applying to records that were "part of an investigation or decision making process upon which final action had not been taken".

=== Initial legislation ===
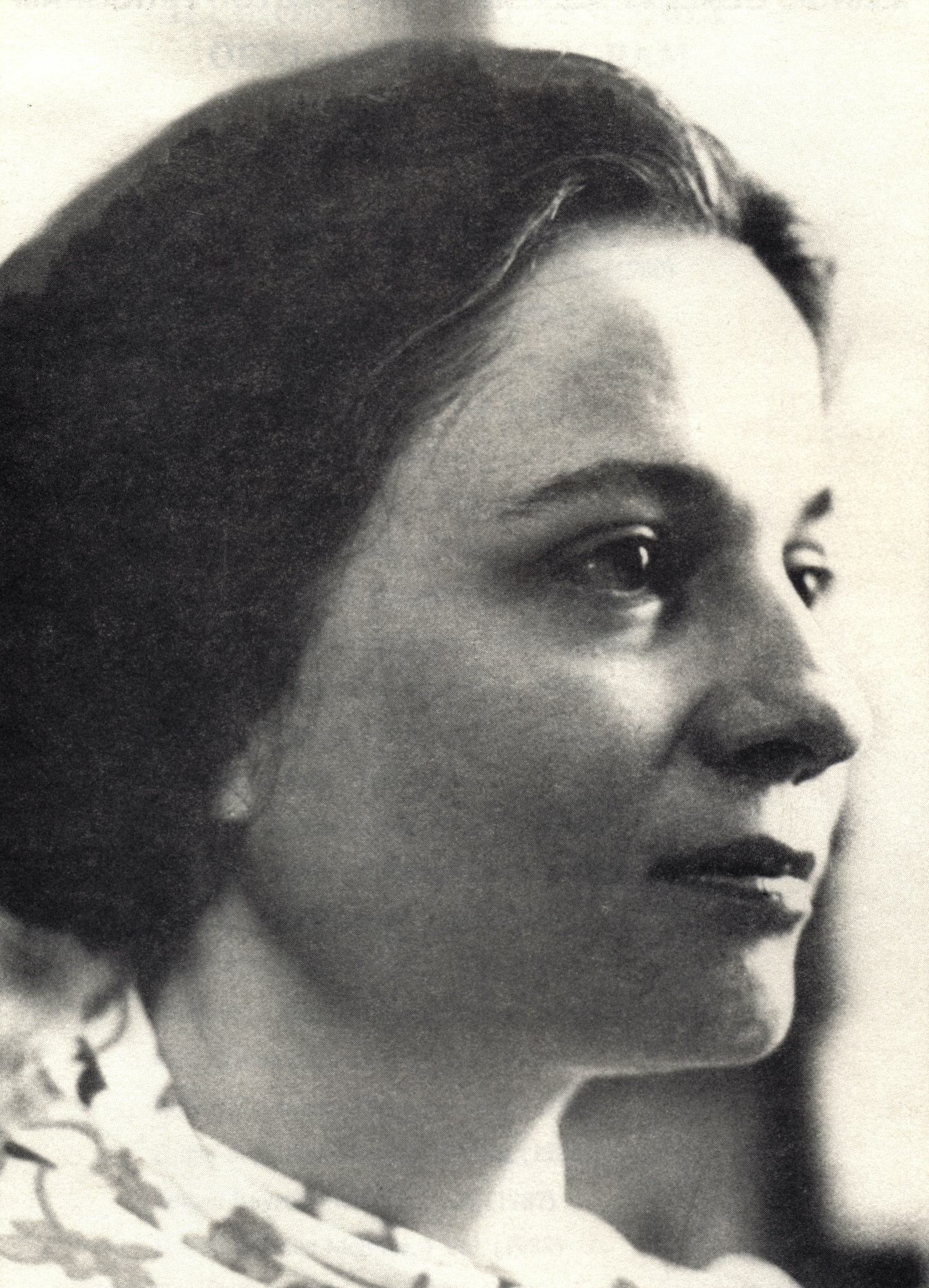
Susan Catania introduced initial FOIA legislation in 1974.

The first version of FOIA was introduced to the General Assembly in 1974 by Representative Susan Catania. Her proposal came after the Watergate scandal, and also the 1968 Democratic National Convention, which was held in Chicago and brought scrutiny to the administration of Mayor Richard J. Daley. However, Catania, a Republican, was a member of the minority party and had trouble gaining supporters for the bill. The Illinois Municipal League, a statewide lobbying organization for municipalities, opposed FOIA as burdensome and disruptive to local government. Other opponents included lobbying organizations for law enforcement and county officials. Impediments to reform included a strong patronage system in Illinois, especially in Chicago, the state's largest city. Chicago-based Democrats in the General Assembly often opposed FOIA initiatives in the mid-1970s, referring the matters back to legislative committees to avoid consideration. These actions reflected Chicago's secretive political climate. Daley, mayor of Chicago from 1955 through 1976, kept few records in writing, and was known to make decisions in a way that was difficult to monitor. This trend continued with the mayors after Daley's tenure, Michael Bilandic and Jane Byrne.

FOIA was introduced during every legislative session from 1974 through 1982, but rejected each time. Supporters included the ACLU and Common Cause, who formed the Illinois Freedom of Information Coalition. The coalition included 26 civic organizations, such as the Chicago Urban League, Chicago Bar Association, League of Women Voters, and the Better Government Association. Jeff Shaman, of the ACLU and a professor at DePaul University College of Law, served as chief drafter of the new law, consulting the federal FOIA, similar laws in other states, and relevant case law. Other contributors to the draft legislation included counsel for the governor, a representative of the attorney general, and the Illinois Press Association. In August 1981, Common Cause and the Better Government Association conducted a survey of 126 state agencies, to assess how those agencies respond to requests for records. The study found that 72 agencies had no written policy on public access to records, 82 lacked a policy on response times, and 35 had no records that were required to be disclosed under the statutes in effect at the time.

In 1983, Mississippi became the 49th state to enact a public records law, leaving Illinois as the only remaining state without a FOIA. In the same year, reform-minded Harold Washington became the mayor of Chicago. Washington, an advocate for increased public participation in government, pledged during the mayoral campaign that he would issue a Freedom of Information order for city government. After the election, Washington's chief of staff signed Chicago's FOI order on May 16, 1983, and it became effective on August 6, 1983.

=== Enactment in 1983–1984 ===
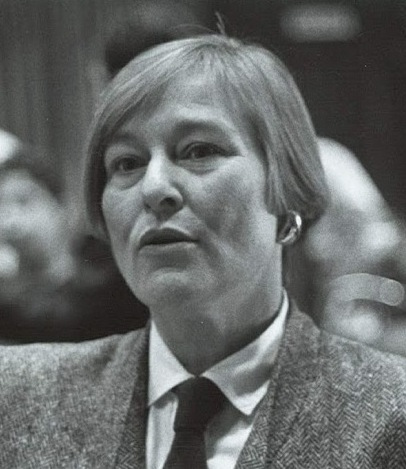
Barbara Flynn Currie sponsored the FOIA legislation that would eventually be enacted.

Catania left the General Assembly in 1982, and Representative Barbara Flynn Currie took over sponsorship of the bill. Currie, a Democrat from Chicago, had endorsed Washington in the mayoral race and supported his reforms. She introduced House Bill 234 to the House of Representatives on February 9, 1983. Currie held several meetings in early 1983 and negotiated with opponents of the bill. Speaker Michael Madigan, who previously opposed FOIA, reversed his position to support the bill after making changes. Madigan's support may have been secured by Currie's influence and Washington's reforms in Chicago. After consideration by the judiciary committee, the bill passed the House on May 25, 1983, and proceeded to the Senate. There, the bill was sponsored by Assistant Majority Leader Terry L. Bruce. The bill passed on June 27, 1983, after being considered by the executive committee. The House concurred in the Senate's amendments the following day. Illinois became the last state in the United States to enact freedom of information legislation.

The law was detailed and comprehensive in its attempt to fill the gaps left by the State Records Act and Local Records Act. The new law defined the scope of FOIA's provisions, and specified the process through which a person can request records from a public body. The new statute codified the common law exemption for "preliminary documents". Courts no longer had to resort to common law balancing tests as frequently as before, unless privacy issues or preliminary documents were involved. FOIA became the exclusive disclosure statute for agencies not already subject to other disclosure statutes, and raised the minimum standards for disclosure above those previously granted under the common law. As concessions to the Illinois Municipal League, the bill was clarified to say that public bodies would not have to keep additional records beyond what was already required, and that requesters would pay for copying costs. By the time the bill passed both houses of the General Assembly, the Illinois Municipal League had secured 11 amendments. The Illinois Press Association, dissatisfied with the large number of compromises, "washed their hands of the process".

==== Amendatory veto ====
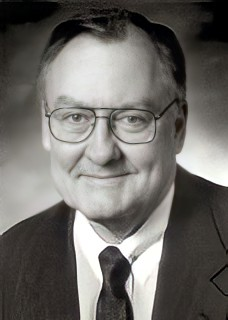
Governor James R. Thompson issued an amendatory veto, and later signed FOIA into law.

Governor James R. Thompson issued an amendatory veto (Note: In an amendatory veto, the Governor makes specific changes and recommendations to the bill. The bill returns to the General Assembly, along with a message indicating that the Governor would approve the bill if the changes are made. The General Assembly can agree to the changes with a simple majority, override the Governor's veto with a three-fifths majority, or let the bill expire by doing nothing.) on September 23, 1983, which weakened the bill by expanding exemptions and removing criminal penalties for non-compliance, among other things. In total, Thompson made over 50 changes to the bill, around half of which were substantive. The changes were influenced by the Illinois Municipal League, along with a state judge. James Zagel, director of the Illinois State Police, proposed changes that expanded the types of records excluded from FOIA, mainly involving police. Internal audits became exempt from disclosure, and the changes further restricted the disclosure of student records, employee grievances, disciplinary cases, and internal audits. The amendatory veto altered the "balance of interests", such that the burden on public bodies no longer had to "strongly" outweigh the public's interest in the information to deny the request. Thompson also moved the effective date of the law from January 1 to July 1, 1984, to give public bodies more time to prepare.

Thompson's usage of the amendatory veto during his administration had been controversial; in 1983 alone, he issued amendatory vetoes for 351 out of 918 acts he signed into law. After the Illinois Constitution of 1970 granted this power for the first time, no other governor had issued amendatory vetoes more extensively than Thompson did, and his actions often created policy disagreements with the General Assembly. Currie considered Thompson's veto a "substantial rewrite" of House Bill 234, and an "invasive abuse of the amendatory veto". The Freedom of Information Council, the Illinois News Broadcasters Association, and WCIA in Champaign wanted the legislature to override, though Currie felt she didn't have the votes needed to do so. Madigan wanted to use the bill as a test case to challenge the governor's amendatory veto power, but other proponents of the bill did not want to risk losing the case, which would have caused the bill to die. The Freedom of Information Coalition, Chicago Tribune, and Peoria's Journal Star urged the legislature to pass the bill as amended. The General Assembly ultimately did not consider whether Thompson had exceeded his veto powers, accepting the amendments on November 2, 1983. With Thompson's certification on December 27, 1983, the law was enacted as Public Act 83–1013. Thompson's actions led directly to a report by a task force on the governor's amendatory veto power, established by Madigan in 1984. The task force concluded that the executive branch had become ascendant in Illinois government.

=== Developments in 1985–2008 ===
In 1985, Harlan Cleveland, dean of the Humphrey School of Public Affairs at the University of Minnesota, conducted a study of the public access laws of all 50 states. The study considered measures including openness for labor negotiations, employment matters, and security issues. Illinois ranked higher than half of states.

Over the nine years after FOIA's enactment, the exemptions were amended numerous times. In 1989, the Illinois Press Association approached Madigan to raise concerns after 15 bills had been introduced that the association felt would have weakened FOIA. Madigan agreed to impose a moratorium on amendments, and formed a task force under Currie's leadership to review the future of FOIA. However, negotiations between the Illinois Municipal League and the Press Association collapsed, leaving the task force at an impasse. A representative of the attorney general's office then formed a new joint committee, which excluded the Municipal League, to discuss the proposed amendments.

The procedures for responding to requests remained stable. By 1993, one lawyer concluded that public bodies had implemented FOIA with "minimal disruptions of operations".

Even with the disclosure requirements codified into law, FOIA was criticized for its weak enforcement provisions. Public bodies were unlikely to face repercussions when denying or ignoring FOIA requests. Starting in 2004, requesters could seek assistance from the Attorney General's Public Access Counselor (PAC), who could mediate disputes and write letters to encourage public bodies to comply with FOIA. However, the PAC had no formal enforcement powers, and its capacities were merely advisory and non-binding. This left the practical burden on requesters to pursue lengthy, time-consuming litigation. Requesters were not likely to appeal to the courts, creating a natural deterrent that public bodies leveraged to avoid full compliance.

An audit conducted by the Better Government Association in 2006 revealed that 62% of public bodies did not comply with FOIA, and 39% did not respond to FOIA requests at all. The Better Government Association also conducted a survey in 2008 with the National Freedom of Information Coalition, ranking Illinois among the 38 out of 50 states receiving a grade of "F" for their versions of FOIA. In addition, the public was contending with a history of corruption in Illinois, considered at the time to be one of the most corrupt states in the United States. Governor Rod Blagojevich had several scandals during his administration, including corruption charges in December 2008 that led to his impeachment and removal from office.

=== Overhaul in 2009–2010 ===
Public Act 96-542

96th Illinois General Assembly
- Passed: May 28, 2009
- Signed by: Governor Pat Quinn
- Signed: August 17, 2009
- Effective: January 1, 2010

Legislative history
- Bill title: SB 189, House Floor Amendment No. 2 (Note: Senate Bill 189 was originally introduced to address an unrelated matter regarding gubernatorial appointments. House Floor Amendment No. 2 replaced the entire bill with new legislation that later became the final version.)
- Introduced by: Michael Madigan (House); Kwame Raoul (Senate)

Amends
- Freedom of Information Act; Attorney General Act; Open Meetings Act

Starting in January 2009, Attorney General Lisa Madigan, daughter of Michael Madigan, worked on draft legislation to amend FOIA with the Illinois Press Association, the Illinois Campaign for Political Reform, the Better Government Association, and Citizen Advocacy Center. The Illinois Reform Commission, appointed by Governor Pat Quinn and led by former federal prosecutor Patrick M. Collins, considered recommendations for ethics reforms over a 100-day period that culminated in a final report issued in April 2009. The commission's recommendations included rewriting FOIA and imposing tougher sanctions for violations. The following month, the commission and the attorney general's office agreed on a joint proposal that would have given Lisa Madigan's office broad authority to settle disputes, impose criminal penalties for willful violations of FOIA, and narrow the exemptions from disclosure. However, staff of Michael Madigan and other legislative leaders circulated an opposing proposal, taking Lisa Madigan's aides by surprise and drawing objections from the Illinois Press Association. The legislative leaders' proposal would have limited the attorney general's authority to only state agencies overseen by the governor, eliminated the proposed criminal penalties, and maintained or broadened existing exemptions from disclosure.

Requesters were also allowed to submit complaints to the PAC, which became a more viable alternative to litigation because it leveled the "playing field" between two government agencies, rather than pitting private citizens against public bodies with more resources. The General Assembly formally recognized and granted additional enforcement powers to the PAC, by amending the Attorney General Act (Note: Attorney General Act (15 ILCS 205/0.01 et seq.)) at the same time as FOIA. With these changes, the PAC could issue subpoenas and file lawsuits in the circuit courts to force compliance with a binding opinion or prevent a FOIA violation.

At the 96th Illinois General Assembly, the final legislation was introduced in the House of Representatives by Michael Madigan on May 27, 2009, as a floor amendment to Senate Bill 189. The bill passed the House the same day, then proceeded to the Senate, where it was sponsored by Kwame Raoul. The Senate concurred in the House's amendment on May 28, 2009. Quinn signed the bill, enacted as Public Act 96–542 on August 17, 2009. The legislation became effective on January 1, 2010, issuing the most sweeping changes to FOIA since the original enactment in 1984. The amendments roughly doubled the size of the Act based on its word count. The Illinois FOIA became considered one of the most liberal and comprehensive public records statutes throughout the United States.

The Illinois Municipal League opposed the changes as "overly burdensome" and "unworkable". It further contended that the updated version of FOIA resulted in a "confusing and complex system for FOIA responses", and presented a "legal thicket" that is overwhelming to officials who process FOIA requests. The Illinois States Attorneys Association also objected, as the Attorney General and the PAC acquired an expanded role under the new law. The Association suggested that the role of the state's attorney should be expanded instead.

Transparency advocates praised the revisions, but still found certain provisions to be inadequate. David Kidwell, a reporter for the Chicago Tribune, expressed concerns about "sweeping" exemptions that still remained, including the privacy or preliminary drafts exemptions. He was also concerned about large amount of power given to the attorney general.

=== Subsequent developments ===
Two weeks after Public Act 96-542 became effective, the General Assembly quickly passed a law that exempted the performance evaluations of school superintendents, principals, and teachers from disclosure. By the end of 2010, the General Assembly passed another law that exempted all public employees' performance evaluations from disclosure. In 2011, more than three dozen bills were introduced in the General Assembly to amend FOIA, most with the goal of reducing disclosure requirements as a backlash to Public Act 96-542. The proposals included bills that would have reduced the rights of "vexatious" requesters, added more exemptions to FOIA, or allowed public bodies to charge higher fees.

In 2015, the Center for Public Integrity reviewed every state's public records laws, giving Illinois a grade of "F". The group contended that the state's enforcement of FOIA is weak, and that public bodies often claim the exemption for requests that are "unduly burdensome". Still, Illinois ranked as the 15th most transparent state under the criteria used by the Center for Public Integrity. Additionally, ProPublica and the Chicago Sun-Times published a report on the PAC in 2018, labeling it "an overwhelmed and inconsistent enforcement system". The PAC has rarely used its full authority to enforce FOIA, and violators have faced few consequences for ignoring the PAC's opinions.

== Scope ==
=== Public bodies ===
FOIA applies to all "public bodies" in Illinois. Public bodies include:

- legislative, executive, administrative, and advisory bodies of the government of Illinois, including boards, bureaus, and commissions
- state universities and colleges
- local governments in Illinois including counties, townships, municipalities, school districts, and all other municipal corporations
- home rule units of government
- subsidiary bodies, such as committees and subcommittees, of the aforementioned entities
- School Finance Authorities created under the Downstate School Finance Authority Law (Note: Downstate School Finance Authority Law (105 ILCS 5/1E-1 et seq.))

However, public bodies do not include child death review teams, the Illinois Child Death Review Teams Executive Council, regional youth advisory boards, or the Statewide Youth Advisory Board. (Note: Child death review teams and the Illinois Child Death Review Teams Executive Council are created by the Child Death Review Team Act (20 ILCS 515/1 et seq.). Regional youth advisory boards and the Statewide Youth Advisory Board are created by the Department of Children and Family Services Statewide Youth Advisory Board Act (20 ILCS 527/1 et seq.).) Additionally, FOIA does not apply to quasi-governmental bodies, such as economic development or strategic planning groups. The Supreme Court held in 2017 that the Illinois High School Association is not subject to FOIA because it is neither a public body nor a subsidiary of a governmental unit. FOIA also does not apply to private universities, even though they may receive research grants and financial support from governmental sources.

Currie, when introducing House Bill 234 to the General Assembly in 1983, stated that the legislature intended to make the courts subject to FOIA, in addition to the executive and legislative branches. However, the judicial branch is omitted from the definition of "public body", so the court in Copley Press v. Administrative Office of the Illinois Courts (Note: Copley Press v. Administrative Office of the Illinois Courts, 271 Ill. App. 3d 548 (2d Dist. 1995), archived from the original on May 17, 2023.) ruled that the judiciary is exempt. Therefore, FOIA does not apply to courts and entities that report to the chief judge, such as a probation department. The Illinois Courts Commission, an adjudicative body of the judiciary, is also exempt. However, court proceedings and related documents are generally open to the public, through other laws like the Clerks of Courts Act. (Note: Clerks of Courts Act (705 ILCS 105/0.01 et seq.))

The textual definition of "public bodies" in FOIA is nearly identical to "public bodies" under the Open Meetings Act, (Note: Open Meetings Act (5 ILCS 120/1 et seq.)) a related Illinois statute that requires meetings to be open to the public. However, the scope of "public bodies" is broader under FOIA, and includes individual officers and agencies who do not hold meetings. However, officials who are merely members of public bodies (such as members of a city council) are not separately considered "public bodies" in their individual capacities.

=== Public records ===
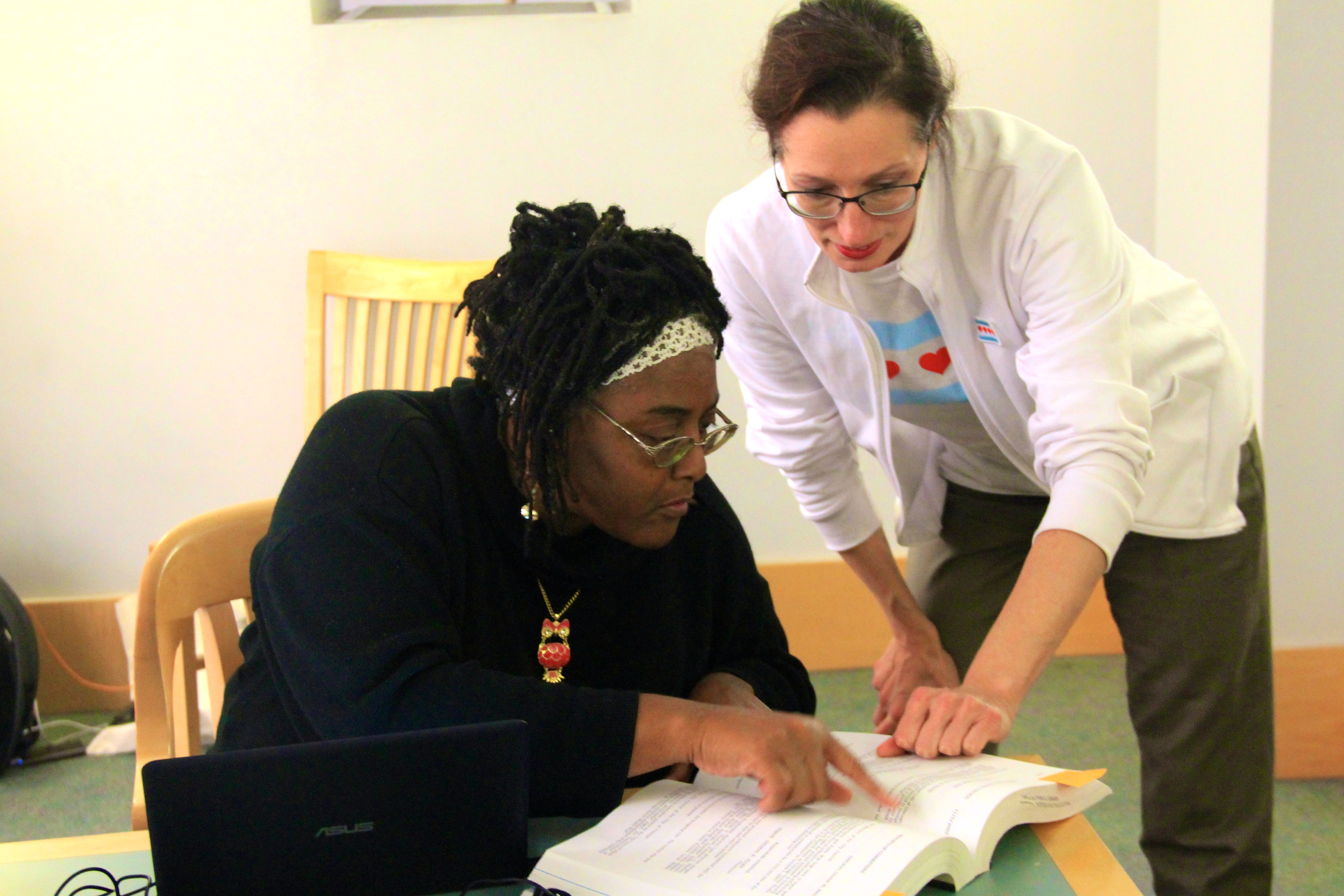
Members of the public inspecting the journal of proceedings of the Chicago City Council

FOIA requires the disclosure of "public records", which includes records "pertaining to the transaction of public business, regardless of physical form or characteristics, having been prepared by or for, or having been or being used by, received by, in the possession of, or under the control of any public body". Records related to public funds, payrolls, arrest reports, and criminal records are also considered "public records".

Records of a public body's contractors are subject to disclosure, provided that the records directly relate to a governmental function. Public bodies cannot contract out their governmental functions to evade disclosure under FOIA. In 2017, the Appellate Court ruled that College of DuPage had to produce records from its fundraising foundation in response to a FOIA request, since the foundation was performing governmental functions on the college's behalf. On the other hand, school districts are not required to disclose records held by the Illinois High School Association, since the association does not perform governmental functions on behalf of a school district. In particular, coordinating athletic events is not a function required by statute.

FOIA does not require public bodies to create new records that do not already exist, though other statutes may already require certain records to be maintained. A requester must seek a particular record, rather than general information or statistics. Public bodies are not obligated to provide a compilation of information that is not already available in an existing record, nor are they required to answer questions, or to explain to requesters the significance or meaning of the information provided. Public records may be stored in a wide range of formats, including paper, electronic, photographs, and audio or video recordings. When the records are available in an electronic format, public bodies must provide the records in the format specified by the requester. In some cases, the requested format might not be feasible to the public body, in which case the public body may opt to provide the records in a different electronic format, or on paper.

==== Enumerated examples in original enactment ====
When it enacted the original version of FOIA, the General Assembly replaced the common law test with a more explicit listing of the types of documents that are to be considered public records. Enumerated examples of public records included, but were explicitly not limited to:

- Administrative manuals, procedural rules, and staff instructions, except for records related to information security
- Adjudicative opinions and orders, except for student or school employee disciplinary cases
- Substantive rules
- Policy statements and interpretations
- Final planning policies, recommendations, and decisions
- Factual reports, inspection reports, and studies
- Information dealing with receipt or expenditure of public funds
- Employment and compensation information for personnel and officers
- Opinions concerning the rights of the state, the public, a governmental agency, or a private person
- Reports of proceedings of public bodies
- Applications for contracts, permits, grants, or agreements, except for trade secrets and commercial information that is confidential
- Reports prepared by consultants and contractors for the public body
- All other information required by law to be made publicly available
- Grants or contracts with another public body or a private organization

A court could easily check this listing to determine whether a record clearly fell within one of the examples provided in the statute. If so, then the General Assembly intended its disclosure. On the other hand, if the record fit neither the listed examples of public records nor the exemptions from disclosure, then the court had to look to other sources, such as specific statutes governing the agency in question, prior to making its determination. Courts could also refer to case law under the federal FOIA, which has a very broad interpretation of what constitutes a public record. The enumerated list of examples was removed by Public Act 96-542.

==== Records on private electronic devices ====
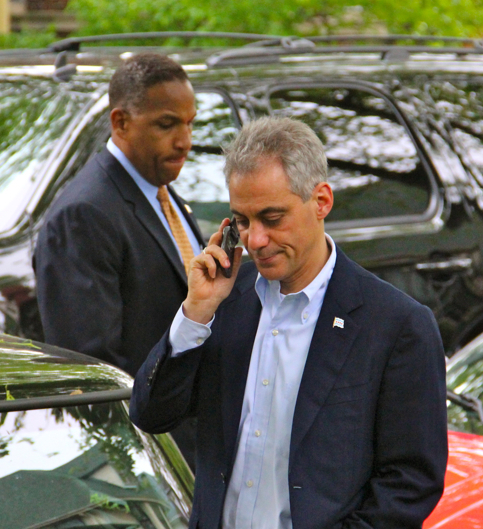
A court ordered Chicago Mayor Rahm Emanuel to disclose messages related to public business stored on his private devices.

Emails and other communications stored on private electronic devices may be subject to disclosure. City of Champaign v. Madigan was the first decision by an Illinois court addressing whether the private emails of government officials are subject to FOIA. In that case, the Appellate Court found that members of a city council do not constitute a "public body" when acting individually, but they do act collectively as a "public body" once they have convened a meeting to conduct public business. By this interpretation, if a constituent sends a message to a city council member at home on their personal device, that message would not be subject to FOIA even if it pertains to public business. However, messages sent and received by elected officials during a city council meeting are public records, regardless of whether they communicated via personal devices not owned by the city.

Regarding employees (rather than elected members) of the public body, the applicability of City of Champaign was unclear, as a legal expert noted that "executive branch employees" act on the public body's behalf. In May 2016, the Circuit Court of Cook County clarified the matter when it ruled that personal emails of Chicago Mayor Rahm Emanuel may be subject to disclosure, even when stored on private devices. Later that year, the Attorney General ruled in Public Access Opinion 16‑006 that officers of the Chicago Police Department were required to disclose their work-related emails stored on personal accounts. In 2020, the Appellate Court ordered the release of correspondence held on private devices of several Chicago officials, including Emanuel (who by then was no longer the mayor), his staff, and the public health commissioner, as such communications are presumed to be used by or prepared for the public body.

==== Settlement and severance agreements ====
Section 2.20 of FOIA expressly provides that settlement and severance agreements are public records subject to disclosure. Prior to Public Act 96-542, public bodies often withheld settlement agreements under the privacy exemption, or by incorporating restrictions into the agreements to evade disclosure. With the enactment of Public Act 96-542, the General Assembly limited or prohibited this practice altogether. Public bodies cannot include confidentiality provisions in settlement agreements to evade disclosure, and such provisions are unenforceable. Subsequently, the General Assembly passed Public Act 99–478 to require the disclosure of severance agreements in addition to settlement agreements. If any settlement or severance agreements contain a non-disclosure provision, such provisions are contrary to FOIA and unenforceable.

==== Police misconduct records ====
Records concerning investigations into police misconduct are not exempt from public disclosure under FOIA. In Kalven v. City of Chicago, the Appellate Court ordered the Chicago Police Department to release its misconduct investigation and disciplinary files, as the records were not part of an adjudication that would have otherwise been exempt from disclosure.

Parties to collective bargaining—such as a public body and its unionized employees—may not negotiate additional exemptions that alter the disclosure requirements of FOIA. After the court's ruling in Kalven, Chicago officials intended to comply by releasing the police misconduct records. However, the city then faced a lawsuit from the Fraternal Order of Police, the police union, claiming that releasing misconduct records older than 5 years would violate the union's collective bargaining agreement. The Appellate Court ruled that the agreement's requirement to destroy records was unenforceable, as it would cause the city to violate FOIA.

=== Exemptions ===
Public bodies may redact information that is exempt from disclosure. Here, Elmhurst Community Unit School District 205 partially redacted the minutes of a school board meeting that was closed to the public under the Open Meetings Act.

FOIA's many exemptions form the longest part of the statute. In 1988, there were 29 exemptions from disclosure listed in the statute. By 2011, FOIA contained roughly 45 exemptions from disclosure, codified in sections 7 and 7.5 of the act. (Note: Section 7: 5 ILCS 140/7, Section 7.5: 5 ILCS 140/7.5) Section 7 contains exemptions that cover private information, personal information, records related to administrative enforcement proceedings, and preliminary drafts containing recommendations or opinions. (Enumerated below in more detail.) Section 7.5 contains "statutory" exemptions, referring to independent statutes that exempt specific types of information from disclosure under FOIA. For example, performance evaluations for all public employees are exempt under section 7.5.

FOIA does not require public bodies to withhold information, and asserting an exemption is at the discretion of the public body. All public records are presumed to be open to the public. If a public body wishes to claim that specific information is exempt from disclosure, it "has the burden of proving by clear and convincing evidence that it is exempt." Thus, the law is broadly interpreted in favor of openness and disclosure, and exemptions are strictly construed. In Lieber v. Board of Trustees of Southern Illinois University, (Note: Lieber v. Board of Trustees of Southern Illinois University, 176 Ill. 2d 401 (1997).) considered to be the seminal case regarding FOIA, the Supreme Court held that as long as a public body can prove that the information falls within the scope of an exemption specified by FOIA, then the information is per se exempt from disclosure.

Noteworthy exemptions include, but are not limited to:

- Information specifically exempted from disclosure by state or federal law.
- Private information, which includes unique identifiers and personal data such as Social Security numbers, driver's license numbers, employee identification numbers, biometrics, passwords, medical records, personal finance information, personal telephone numbers, and personal email addresses. Private information also includes home addresses and personal license plate numbers, except when disclosure is required by law or when the information is compiled without possible attribution to a person. Biometrics include fingerprints and voice patterns, but not photo identification. Public bodies can withhold people's names under this exemption if such disclosure would reveal personal financial information, such as eligibility for scholarships or financial assistance.
- Law enforcement records that, if disclosed, would interfere with a pending or "contemplated" proceeding, disclose the identity of a confidential source, or endanger the life or physical safety of any person.
- Business trade secrets or commercial information that is proprietary or confidential, and disclosure would cause competitive harm.
- Procurement proposals and bids until a final selection is made.
- Minutes of meetings closed to the public under the Open Meetings Act.
- Attorney communications protected by attorney–client privilege. However, attorney billing invoices are generally subject to disclosure.
- Records relating to the adjudication of employee grievances or disciplinary cases, except that when discipline is imposed, the final decision is subject to disclosure. If there was an investigation that did not lead to an adjudicatory proceeding, then those records do not relate to an "adjudication" and are not covered by the exemption.
- Administrative or technical information associated with automated data processing, including software, file layouts, user guides, and design documentation of computerized systems.
- Names and information of individuals who applied for Firearm Owner's Identification cards.

==== Invasions of personal privacy ====
FOIA provides an exemption from disclosure for "personal information" that, if disclosed, would constitute a "clearly unwarranted invasion of personal privacy", which means "disclosure of information that is highly personal or objectionable to a reasonable person and in which the subject’s right to privacy outweighs any legitimate public interest in obtaining the information". On the other hand, information that relates to the public duties of a public employee or official is not considered an invasion of personal privacy.

Personnel records are normally considered to be private and exempt from disclosure. However, in Stern v. Wheaton-Warrenville Community Unit School District 200, (Note: Stern v. Wheaton-Warrenville Community Unit School District 200, 233 Ill. 2d 396 (2009).) the Supreme Court ruled that employment contracts must be released to the public, even when contained within a personnel file, because they bear on the public duties of public employees. Job applications and resumes of public employees are also subject to disclosure, as they bear on the employees' abilities to perform their duties satisfactorily. Other disclosable information includes employee timesheets, requests for time off, administrative evaluations, student evaluations of teachers (with student information redacted), complaints against employees (with complainant information redacted), records of dismissals, and settlement agreements with former employees. On the other hand, this exemption covers: dates of birth, marital status, records relating to maternity leave, medical information, personal appointments on an employee calendar, and past salary history from private employers.

==== Preliminary drafts and pre-decisional materials ====
FOIA provides an exemption from disclosure for preliminary drafts, notes, or recommendations in which opinions are expressed or policies are formed. However, records that are publicly cited and identified by the head of the public body (Note: FOIA defines "head of the public body" as "the president, mayor, chairman, presiding officer, director, superintendent, manager, supervisor or individual otherwise holding primary executive and administrative authority for the public body, or such person's duly authorized designee".) are not exempt from disclosure. The bill originally passed by the General Assembly contained a more limited exemption, which Thompson found to have a chilling effect on internal debate within agencies. His amendatory veto expanded the scope of this exemption.

This exemption is modeled after the "deliberative process" exemption in the federal FOIA. Therefore, case law involving the federal FOIA is used to help interpret this exemption in Illinois law. The Appellate Court has held that this exemption is intended to protect internal agency communications and encourage frank and open discussion among agency officials, or between agencies and outside consultants, before a final decision is made. The exemption applies when the information is "pre-decisional", occurring before the adoption of policy, and "deliberative", relating to the formulation of policy. The underlying agency policy or action must also be "substantive". The final decision, and any factual information, would be subject to disclosure.

==== School and university records ====
During negotiations for the bill originally passed in 1983, representatives of the University of Illinois secured an exemption to protect: the privacy of scholarly peer review, the adjudication of student or employee grievances and disciplinary cases, and course or research materials used by faculty members. However, despite having lobbied for these special exemptions, universities invoke them less frequently than more generic exemptions, such as invasions of personal privacy, preliminary drafts, and attorney–client communications.

Other exemptions affecting schools and universities include: formulae, designs, drawings, and research data if disclosure would produce private gain or public loss; and test questions, scoring keys, and other examination data. Personal student information may also be exempt from disclosure under FOIA. However, a federal district court in Illinois has ruled that public bodies may not rely on the federal Family Educational Rights and Privacy Act to withhold documents concerning students, as that law does not prohibit such disclosure.

== Requesting records ==
Sample FOIA request form provided by the Attorney General. Public bodies may recommend, but not require, that requesters use a specified form.

All public bodies are required to appoint at least one FOIA officer, who is responsible for receiving and responding to FOIA requests. FOIA officers also complete annual training offered by the PAC. Public bodies are required to publicly display the names and contact information of its FOIA officers, along with instructions on how to submit a FOIA request. FOIA officers are required by the statute to record the date that the FOIA request was received, note the deadline to respond, maintain a copy of the FOIA request until the request has been granted or denied, and create a file to retain the original request, the response, written communications with the requester, and other communications.

Any person may submit a FOIA request, including people who live outside Illinois. Most FOIA requests come from non-journalists. Requesters may make their FOIA request in writing, such as by postal mail, email, fax, or in person. Public bodies may also accept oral requests, but are not required to do so. Public bodies cannot require requesters to use a specific form. When a requester seeks documents under FOIA provisions that were subsequently amended, the version of FOIA in effect at the time of the request is controlling, unless the legislature specifies that the amendments are retroactive.

=== Deadlines and responses ===
Under the original version of FOIA, public bodies were given seven working days to comply with a request, and were allowed to extend their deadlines by an additional seven days under certain circumstances. These timelines were shortened by Public Act 96-542, which required public bodies to respond to non-commercial FOIA requests within five business days. Public bodies may extend their deadlines by an additional five business days under certain circumstances, and must explain to the requester the reason for the extension. Also, requesters and public bodies may reach their own agreements to grant more time for public bodies to comply with the request. Failing to respond by the statutory deadline is considered a denial of the FOIA request, and public bodies can no longer impose fees if they subsequently provide the requested records after the deadline. The Better Government Association, analyzing PAC data from April 2010 through March 2018, found that there were 4,668 cases in which public bodies initially failed to meet the deadlines to respond, and ultimately responded only after PAC intervention. Top offenders included the Chicago Police Department, Illinois Department of Corrections, Illinois State Police, Chicago Public Schools, and the Cook County State's Attorney.

Requesters cannot be compelled to explain the purpose of their requests, except to determine whether the records will be used for a "commercial purpose". If the request is for commercial purposes, the deadline for the public body to respond increases from 5 to 21 business days. Commercial requests do not include those made by news, non-profit, scientific, or academic organizations. Public bodies cannot deny requests solely because they have a commercial purpose. Although the original legislation effective in 1984 stated that FOIA was not intended "for the purpose of furthering a commercial enterprise," this statement was in the preamble, not in the body of the act. Therefore, the Supreme Court held in Lieber that it had no legal force. Public bodies in local government have considered FOIA requests from large commercial entities to be among the most burdensome unfunded mandates.

With the enactment of Public Act 98–1129, effective December 3, 2014, public bodies may also extend the deadlines for "voluminous" requests. These are requests that seek more than five different categories of records within a period of 20 days, or requests that seek multiple records totaling more than 500 pages. Similar to commercial requests, voluminous requests do not include those made by news, non-profit, scientific, or academic organizations. When treating the request as voluminous, the public body must allow the requester 10 business days to narrow the request. The public body will then respond to the request within five business days, but if the request remains voluminous, then the deadline is extended by an additional 10 business days.

During the initial response in April 2020 to the COVID-19 pandemic in Illinois, municipal officials urged Raoul, by then serving as Attorney General, to extend the deadline to respond to FOIA requests, as public bodies were operating with fewer employees and struggled to maintain core services. However, Raoul's office contended that it did not have the authority to suspend FOIA deadlines during the pandemic. In May 2020, the General Assembly considered a bill that would have postponed all FOIA deadlines by 30 days. The proposal was controversial, and it failed by one vote in the House of Representatives.

=== Fees ===
Public bodies may charge fees for providing copies of records, according to a standard fee schedule that must be publicly available. The bill initially proposed in 1983 stated that public bodies could charge a maximum of 50 cents per page, but this provision was deleted by the Senate in favor of allowing public bodies to charge the actual costs of copying the records. Additionally, the initial version of the bill allowed for a waiver of fees if the requester was "indigent". Thompson's amendatory veto struck this provision, noting that there was no objective criteria to determine whether a person is indigent. In 1997, FOIA was amended to require fee waivers or fee reductions when the FOIA request is not for "personal or commercial benefit".

Starting in 2010, Public Act 96-542 set limits on the amount of fees that may be charged to a requester. For black-and-white copies on letter or legal size paper, the first 50 pages are free, and additional pages may cost up to 15 cents per page. For other types of records, public bodies may continue to charge fees that cover the actual costs of copying or providing the required storage media. For "voluminous" requests, the public body may require fees to be paid in full before processing the request. If the requester fails to collect or accept the records, the public body may still charge the fees, considered a debt owed by the requester. Public bodies may waive fees if disclosure is in the "public interest", meaning that the information concerns the welfare or rights of the general public, and disclosure does not provide a personal or commercial benefit.

Public bodies may not charge for staff's time spent searching for and reviewing the records. An Illinois task force on local government found FOIA compliance to be an unfunded mandate, and agencies have reported high personnel costs to hire full-time FOIA officers.

=== Denials ===
If a request is denied, the public body must issue its denial in writing, and provide the legal reasons for withholding the information. The denial letter must include the names and titles of each person responsible for denying the FOIA request. The public body must also notify the requester of the right to appeal to the PAC or to file litigation.

Public bodies may deny requests as "unduly burdensome" if fulfilling the request would interfere with the public body's operations in a way that outweighs the public's interest in disclosure. However, the public body must first work with the requester to attempt to narrow the scope of the request. A court can still order disclosure when it is in the public interest; in 2021 the Appellate Court held that the Chicago Board of Education must review 28,000 pages of records due to the significant public interest in records related to racial discrimination.

Public Act 96-542 required public bodies to seek pre-approval from the PAC prior to denying records based on the personal privacy or preliminary drafts exemptions, even without the requesters initiating their own complaints. Once this requirement became effective in 2010, pre-approval of FOIA denials eventually comprised a large portion of the PAC's workload. Of the complaints received by the PAC in 2010, 63 percent were requests for pre-approval of a FOIA denial. This requirement was repealed by the end of 2011 to ease the workload of the PAC and public bodies.

The Better Government Association, analyzing PAC data from April 2010 through March 2018, found that there were 1,345 cases in which the PAC found that the public body incorrectly asserted a FOIA exemption, approximately 30% of cases in which the PAC made a substantive (as opposed to procedural) determination. Top offenders included the City of East St. Louis, University of Illinois system, City of Joliet, Illinois Department of Central Management Services, Illinois Department of Transportation, and the Chicago Police Department.

== Enforcement ==
=== Head of the public body ===
Under the original version of FOIA, if a public body denies a FOIA request, the requester must first appeal to the head of the public body. The statute gave no deadline to appeal, but the Illinois Municipal League advised public bodies to set a 14-day limit. If the head of the public body affirmed the denial, or failed to respond within 7 days, then the requester could file litigation in court. Public bodies were advised to appoint other employees to initially handle FOIA requests, so that the head could focus on appeals and obtain legal advice as needed. The Illinois Commerce Commission has noted that this appeals process has sometimes helped requesters receive the information they had initially been denied. In other cases, the explanation of the denial by the head of the public body may have satisfied the requester, who would then opt not to litigate further. This helped alleviate the workload of the courts. However, this process was also viewed as "perfunctory" and repealed by Public Act 96-542, which allowed requesters to file litigation immediately after receiving the initial denial.

=== Litigation ===
Unlike the Open Meetings Act, FOIA does not authorize state's attorneys to bring charges for violations. Instead, requesters enforce FOIA on their own, acting as private attorney general. The requester may appeal by filing litigation in the circuit court, and there is no deadline for the requester to file suit. When litigation is filed, the court considers the matter de novo and conducts an in camera review of the records to determine whether the information is exempt from disclosure. FOIA cases take precedence on the court's docket. If the court finds that FOIA has been violated, it may provide injunctive or declaratory relief, ordering the disclosure of records. The court's orders are enforceable through its contempt powers. However, lawsuits may last for months, or even years, before records are released. Cases may be appealed to the Appellate Court, and then to the Supreme Court. However, the Supreme Court only rarely agrees to consider FOIA appeals, due to their relatively low priority compared to other cases.

In 1995, it was estimated that litigation could cost requesters $2,000–4,000 at the lowest level, and $30,000–45,000 for appeals. The bill initially proposed in 1983 gave the court discretion to award attorney's fees to successful plaintiffs. However, Thompson's amendatory veto required that the requester "substantially prevail" in litigation, that the records were "of clearly significant interest to the general public", and that the public body lacked "any rational legal basis" for denying the request. Thus, awards of attorney's fees became unlikely, except for the most severe violations. Attorneys proceeding pro se are not entitled to an award of their fees. The court also could not impose civil penalties on the public body.

Public Act 96-542 introduced civil penalties between $2,500 and $5,000 per violation if the court finds that the public body "willfully and intentionally" violated FOIA. The Appellate Court has held that a public body "willfully and intentionally" violates FOIA when it acts "deliberately, by design, or with a dishonest purpose". The new law also stated that awards of attorney's fees are mandatory when requesters "prevail" in litigation (compared to "substantially prevail" under the prior version of FOIA), a provision intended to promote accountability and discourage frivolous denials. Still, there is conflicting case law that leaves uncertainty and confusion among FOIA litigants. In Rock River Times v. Rockford Public School District 205, (Note: Rock River Times v. Rockford Public School District 205, 2012 IL App (2d) 110879.) the Appellate Court for the Second District noted that the legislature had removed the word "substantially", which modified the verb "prevail". Since this change had not aligned with a 2007 amendment to the federal FOIA that used the phrase "substantially prevail", the court concluded that the General Assembly had intended to narrow the circumstances under which plaintiffs recover attorney's fees. Under Rock River Times, a plaintiff "prevails" only when receiving the requested records pursuant to a court order; not when the public body releases the records prior to any judicial intervention. On the other hand, the Appellate Court for the First District reached the opposite conclusion in Uptown People's Law Center v. Department of Corrections. (Note: Uptown People’s Law Center v. Department of Corrections, 2014 IL App (1st) 130161.) In that case, the court found that the General Assembly had intended to expand the ability of plaintiffs to recover attorney's fees, even when the lawsuit is resolved prior to a court order. However, the court also determined that non-profit organizations with salaried attorneys cannot be reimbursed for their legal expenses in enforcing FOIA requests.

An investigation by the Better Government Association showed that the city of Chicago paid $2.4 million in attorney's fees to requesters who had prevailed in FOIA litigation from 2010 through 2021. Roughly 90 percent of the city's payouts involved FOIA denials by the Chicago Police Department, including denials of access to police shooting videos. The requesters were often the media, citizen activists, and relatives or attorneys on behalf of people injured or killed by police. John Rappaport, a professor at the University of Chicago Law School, speculated that these FOIA denials are driven by a lack of clear precedent from the courts, along with an insular culture at the police department. The Better Government Association's investigation did not find similar patterns of FOIA denials by other public bodies. FOIA's mandatory awards of attorney's fees has prompted a small number of attorneys, such as the Loevy & Loevy law firm, to specialize in filing public records litigation. Loevy & Loevy filed over 100 such lawsuits against the city of Chicago from 2019 to 2022.

=== Public Access Counselor ===
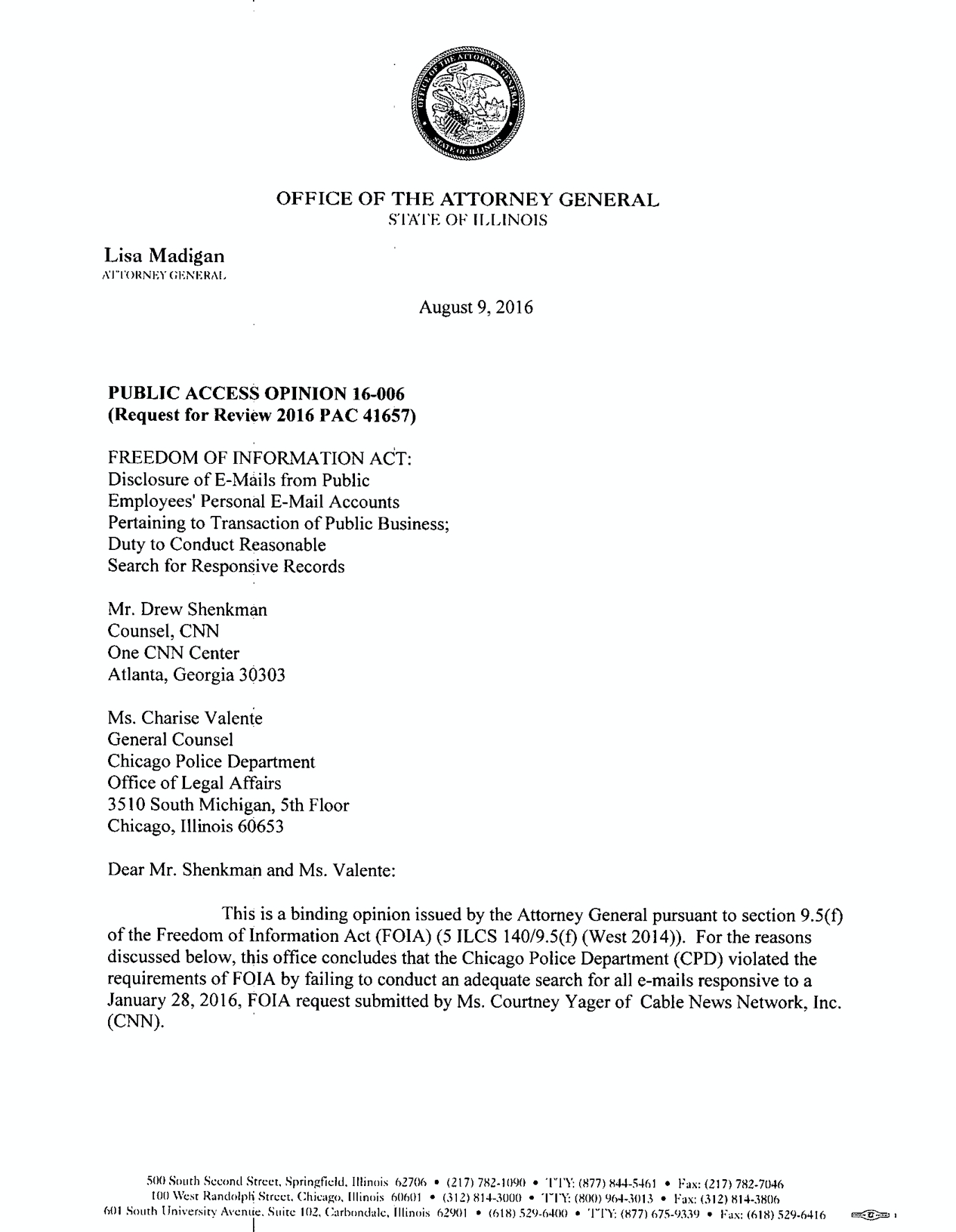
First page of Illinois Public Access Opinion 16‑006, issued by the Attorney General in 2016

The requester may also appeal to the PAC within 60 days of the FOIA denial. Unlike litigation, the PAC review process is available at no cost to the requester. However, FOIA requests to the General Assembly or its subsidiary bodies may not be appealed to the PAC. People whose FOIA requests are treated as commercial requests cannot appeal to the PAC, except for the limited purpose of reviewing whether the FOIA request was made for a commercial purpose. Similarly, people whose requests are considered voluminous may ask the PAC to review only whether the request was properly determined to be voluminous. The PAC will review whether the FOIA request was properly denied, and may issue a subpoena to obtain more information. Requesters may not appeal through the PAC and the courts at the same time. If the PAC is already reviewing the matter when a lawsuit is filed, then the requester must notify the PAC, who will stop its review and take no further action.

The PAC may issue a binding opinion within 60 days of receiving the complaint, and this timeline may be extended by an additional 21 days. If the PAC issues a binding opinion, the result is binding on the requester and the public body, but either side may continue to appeal in court under administrative review. Binding opinions also establish precedent for other public bodies issuing FOIA denials under similar circumstances. Binding opinions are rare, as they are issued for only less than half of one percent of complaints submitted to the PAC. Since binding opinions are subject to legal challenge in the courts, the PAC is intentionally conservative in issuing them, seeing itself as an alternative to litigation. The PAC generally issues binding opinions on "issues of broad public interest", and is careful to research each case to ensure that its opinions are upheld upon judicial review. Journalists and news organizations are more likely than private citizen requesters to receive a binding opinion.

When the PAC declines to issue a binding opinion, it is no longer bound by any statutory deadlines to resolve the matter. It may issue a non-binding or advisory opinion, resolve the dispute through mediation, or decide to take no further action on the matter. Requesters often wait months or years before their appeals are reviewed by the PAC. Of the more than 28,000 appeals filed with the PAC from January 2010 through August 2018, over 3,800 appeals took more than one year to resolve, and about 500 took more than four years to resolve.
