= White Oaks Mall (Springfield, Illinois) =

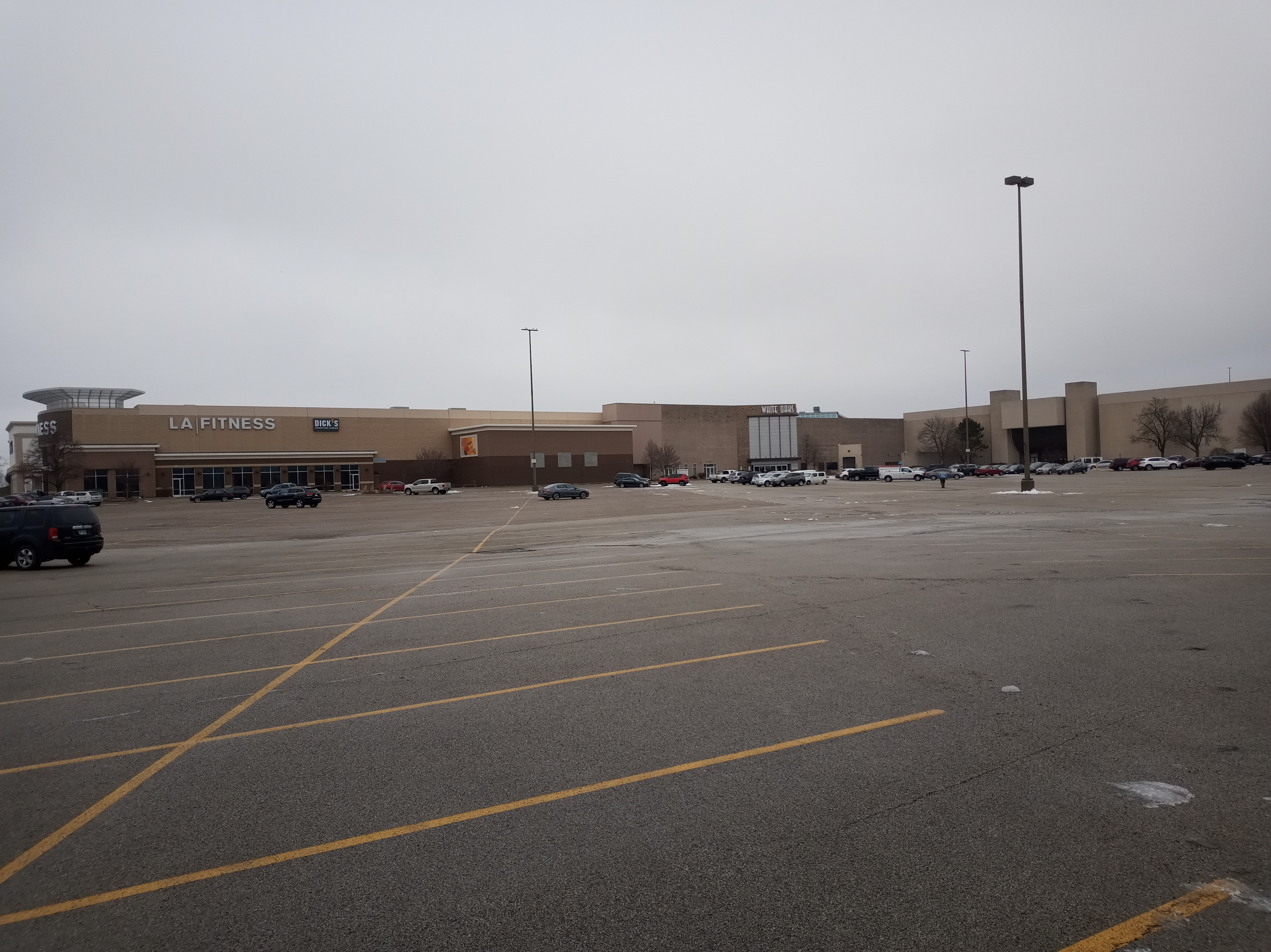
- White Oaks Mall from the southeast
- Location: Springfield, Illinois
- Coordinates: 39.76723°N 89.70358°W
- Address: 2501 Wabash Ave
- Opened: August 24, 1977; 49 years ago
- Manager: Simon Property Group
- Owner: Simon Property Group (80.7%)
- Num. of stores: 77
- Num. of anchor tenants: 6 (5 open, 1 vacant)
- Floor area: 928,772 square feet (86,285.7 m^{2})
- Floors: 2
- Public transit: SMTD
- Website: simon.com/mall/white-oaks-mall

White Oaks Mall is a shopping mall in Springfield, Illinois, United States. It is located on the southwest side of Springfield, approximately five miles (8 km) southwest of the city center, at the junction of Illinois Route 4 (Veterans Parkway) and Wabash Avenue. With 928,772 square feet (86,285.7 m^{2}) of retail space, it is the largest shopping mall in Central Illinois. The mall is anchored by Malibu Jack’s, Illinois Environmental Protection Agency, and Dick’s Sporting Goods. Junior anchors in the former Montgomery Ward anchor building are Michaels, and Esporta Fitness. The mall's former Sears anchor store was remodeled in 2025 as state government offices.

== History ==
Construction began in 1974. The original planned name of the mall was Westroads Mall. Ed McMahon and Billy Carter attended the grand opening, on August 24, 1977. The four original anchor stores were Sears, Montgomery Ward, Famous-Barr and Myers Brothers. Myers Brothers was bought by Bergner's in 1978 and the store was rebranded in 1983.

In the early 1990s, it underwent a $14 million renovation which included the addition of a new food court. A carousel was installed in 1997.

White Oaks Mall houses over 100 stores. Its operator, the Simon Property Group, which owns 80.7% of the mall, describes White Oaks Mall as a "super-regional shopping mall". The mall shares its name with the White Oak, the state tree of Illinois.

White Oaks Mall has a children's play area. The Children's Place and Carter's specialize in juvenile clothing.

In 2001, the Montgomery Ward anchor store closed, after the chain went out of business. In 2006, all Famous-Barr stores were rebranded as Macy's.

In July 2018, the Bergner's anchor store closed when the parent company, Bon Ton, went out of business. In September 2018, the Sears anchor store closed as part of a plan to close 78 stores nationwide. This left Macy's as the only traditional anchor store.

In 2020, the Illinois Department of Central Management Services, the custodian of Illinois state government real estate, purchased the 120,000 sq ft Sears anchor store, to be remodeled as office space for the Illinois Department of Innovation and Technology, Illinois Environmental Protection Agency, and Illinois Pollution Control Board. In January 2025, after $80 million in remodeling work, the Illinois EPA moved into the building.

After Bergner’s closed, the space was replaced with an entertainment facility known as Malibu Jack’s in 2023. Malibu Jack’s has since become the primary anchor tenant for the space.

On January 9, 2025, it was announced that Macy's store would close as part of a plan to close 66 stores nationwide. The store closed in March 2025, leaving the mall with no traditional anchors but with non-traditional anchor tenants with more of a focus on entertainment and office space.
