= City of Champaign v. Madigan =

Illinois court case concerning freedom of information

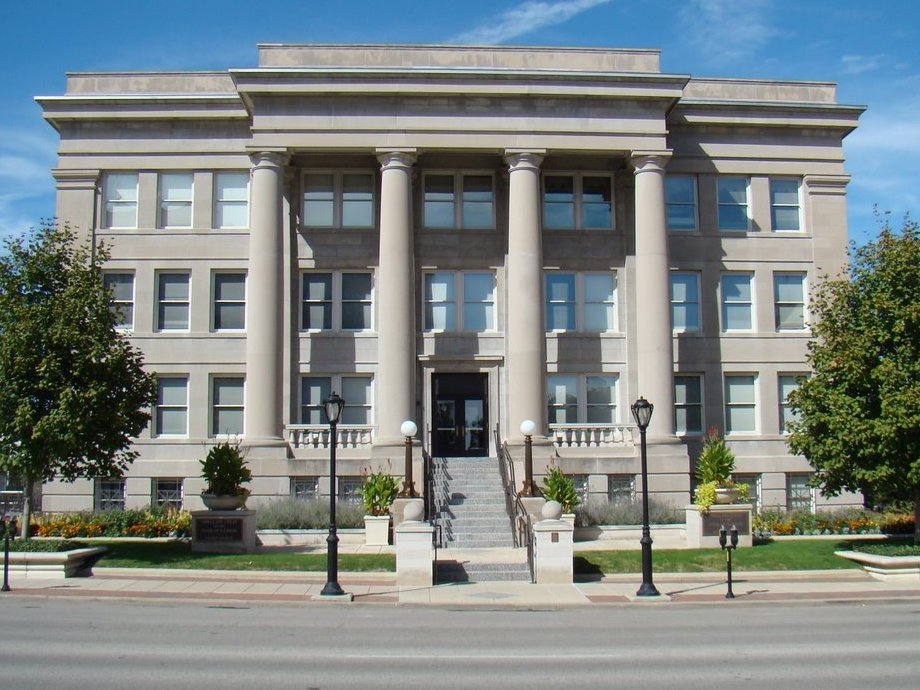
- Fourth District Appellate Court building in Springfield, Illinois
- Court: Illinois Appellate Court, Fourth District
- Full case name: The City of Champaign v. Lisa Madigan, Attorney General of the State of Illinois; Patrick Wade; and The News-Gazette, Inc.
- Decided: July 16, 2013
- Citations: 2013 IL App (4th) 120662; 992 N.E.2d 629 (2013)

Case history
- Prior actions: Attorney General, Public Access Opinion 11-006
- Appealed from: Circuit Court of Sangamon County, No. 11-MR-680; John Schmidt, Judge, presiding

Court membership
- Judges sitting: Carol Pope, Thomas R. Appleton, Lisa Holder White

Case opinions
- Electronic communications during city council meetings and pertaining to public business are subject to disclosure under the Freedom of Information Act, regardless of whether they are stored on personal devices.
- Decision by: Pope, joined by Appleton, Holder White

City of Champaign v. Madigan, 2013 IL App (4th) 120662, 992 N.E.2d 629 (2013), is a case decided by the Illinois Appellate Court in 2013 concerning the state's Freedom of Information Act (FOIA). The court ruled that messages sent and received by elected officials during a city council meeting and pertaining to public business are public records subject to disclosure, even when those communications are stored on personal electronic devices. It was the first court ruling in Illinois to hold that private messages were subject to public disclosure under FOIA.

The case addressed a public records request from a reporter for The News-Gazette in Champaign, Illinois, who observed Champaign city council members and the mayor using their personal electronic devices to send messages during a city council meeting. City officials denied the reporter's request for disclosure of the private messages. The case eventually reached the Appellate Court, which held that public officials have to disclose their records, even if they are stored on a personal electronic device or account, but only when acting as a public body. The court found that members of a city council do not constitute a public body when acting individually. However, because the city council members in question had convened a public meeting, they were acting collectively as a public body, and their messages were therefore subject to disclosure under FOIA.

== Background ==
Patrick Wade, a reporter for The News-Gazette in Champaign, Illinois, observed members of the Champaign city council and mayor Don Gerard using their personal electronic devices to send messages during a public meeting. Curious about the contents of their private discussions, Wade filed a Freedom of Information Act (FOIA) request to the city on July 15, 2011, for the following records:

All electronic communications, including cellphone text messages, sent and received by members of the city council and the mayor during city council meetings and study sessions since (and including) May 3. Please note that this request applies to both city-issued and personal cellphones, city-issued or personal email addresses and Twitter accounts.

City officials provided Wade with 24 pages of emails stored on city-owned accounts. However, they denied his request for records from personal devices, responding that "private citizen's communications to the Council member's or the Mayor's privately owned electronic devices is not within the scope of the Freedom of Information Act." A city attorney also advised Wade that the Appellate Court had previously held, in Quinn v. Stone, (Note: Quinn v. Stone, 211 Ill. App. 3d 809 (1st Dist. 1991).) that only a public body is subject to FOIA, not individual public officials such as the mayor or city council members.

On August 1, 2011, Wade requested administrative review by the Public Access Counselor, the bureau of the Illinois Attorney General responsible for enforcing FOIA. Wade maintained that the requested records, even when privately held, are subject to disclosure because the officials were each communicating "in their role as a member of that public body during an ongoing public meeting".

== Attorney General opinion ==
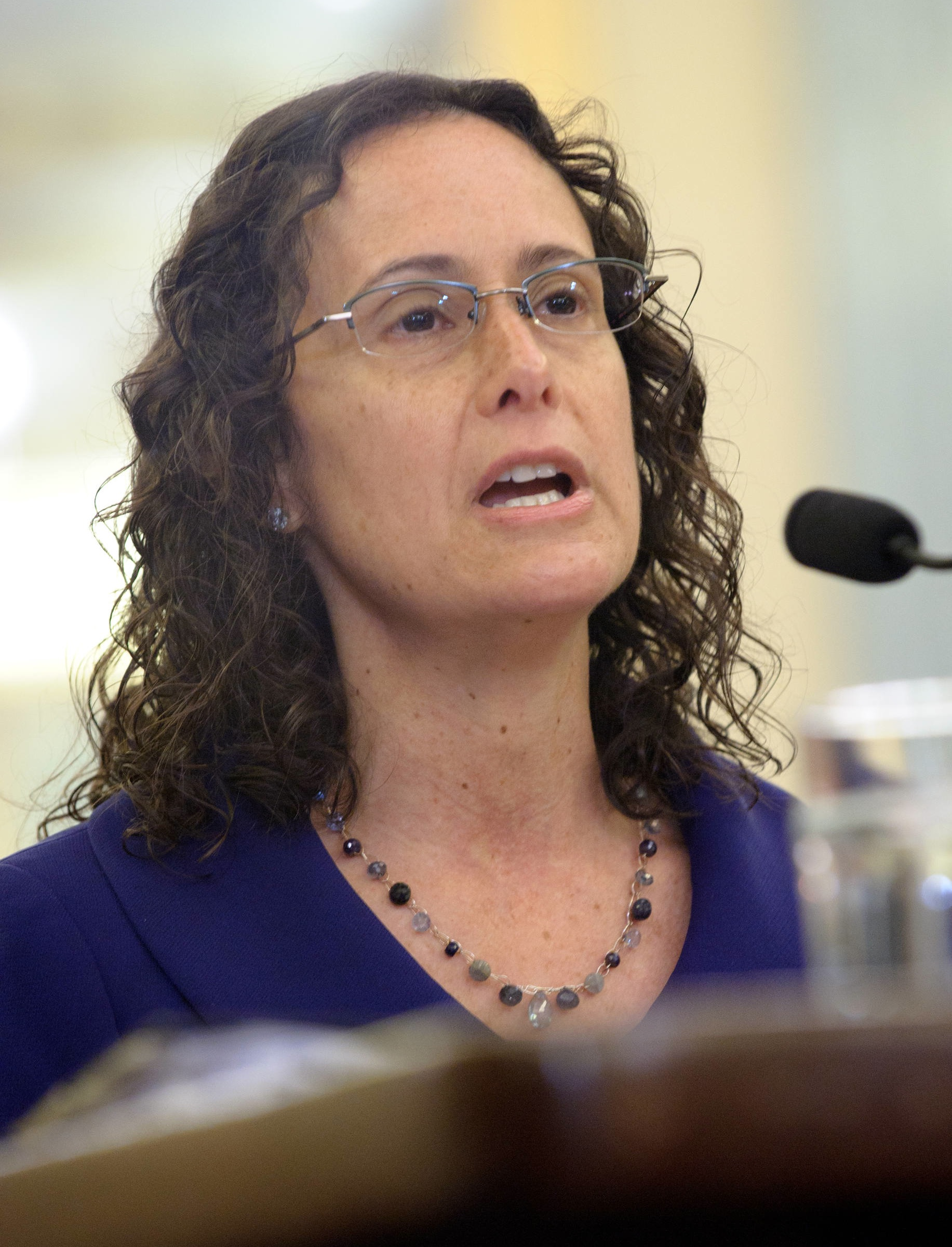
Illinois Attorney General Lisa Madigan in 2011

The Attorney General's office, led by Lisa Madigan, issued a binding opinion titled "Public Access Opinion 11-006" on November 15, 2011. (Note: The opinion was signed on Madigan's behalf by Michael J. Luke, counsel to the Attorney General.) Binding opinions are rare; less than 0.5 percent of complaints submitted to the Public Access Counselor result in a binding opinion from the Attorney General. (Note: Most complaints to the Public Access Counselor are resolved by advisory opinions that are not legally binding on the parties.) The ruling held that electronic communications, whether on publicly or privately owned devices, may be subject to disclosure under FOIA.

The opinion referred to FOIA's definition of public records, which includes documents "pertaining to the transaction of public business, regardless of physical form or characteristics, having been prepared by or for, or having been or being used by, received by, in the possession of, or under the control of any public body". The Attorney General concluded that the city was narrowly focused on the phrase "in the possession of" when determining whether the requested communications were subject to disclosure. When construing FOIA as a whole, the opinion stated that records "in the possession of" the city are only one type of public record. The opinion further added: "Whether information is a 'public record' is not determined by where, how, or on what device that record was created; rather the question is whether that record was prepared by or used by one or more members of a public body in conducting the affairs of government." The key factor in determining what constitutes a public record is whether the record relates to public business.

The Attorney General also rejected the city's reliance on Quinn. In Quinn, the Appellate Court determined that a FOIA request cannot be directed at an individual official, but must instead be submitted to a public body. In this case, the opinion affirmed the court's decision in Quinn, but asserted that the communications of city officials are considered records of the city and not of the officials individually.

Lastly, the city raised concerns that disclosure of private information could potentially implicate First Amendment rights. However, the opinion stated that records needed to be produced only when they relate to public business, and there was no evidence that such disclosure would violate the First Amendment. Family matters, political business, and other personal issues would not be subject to disclosure.

== Appeals ==
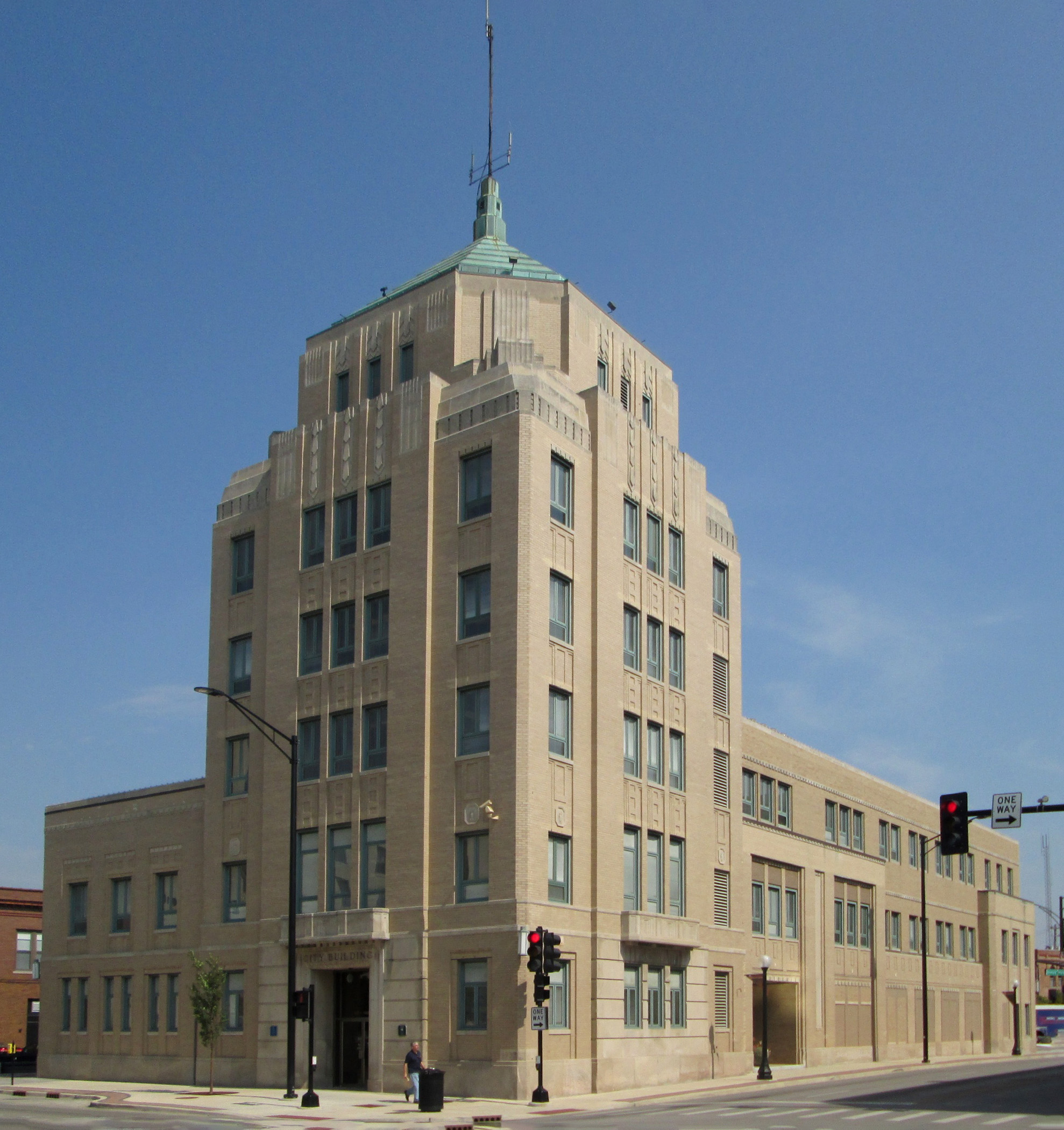
City Building of Champaign, Illinois

The city attorney – handling the matter internally rather than through outside counsel – felt that the Attorney General's opinion had addressed a novel question that warranted further review by a court. The city had to make a strategic decision on where to appeal – either the Circuit Court of Cook County or that of Sangamon County. The city ultimately appealed the Attorney General's opinion in Sangamon County. In the circuit court proceedings, attorney Laura Hall represented the city, while attorney Don Craven represented The News-Gazette. Craven contended that the text messages are part of the city council's deliberations, and "voters are entitled to hear the deliberations" of public bodies.

The circuit court affirmed the Attorney General's opinion in June 2012. The city then appealed to the Fourth District of the Appellate Court. On July 16, 2013, the Appellate Court upheld the opinion that the messages were public records, but on more limited grounds. The court's opinion was written by Justice Carol Pope. The other members of the appellate panel, Justices Thomas R. Appleton and Lisa Holder White, agreed with Pope's opinion.

First, the court clarified that messages concerning personal matters were not subject to disclosure, since FOIA addresses only records pertaining to the transaction of public business. Communications relating to community interests, rather than private affairs, constitute public records under FOIA. The city admitted that some of the communications related to this case were related to public business.

The court found that, while the individual members of a city council are not considered a public body, they collectively form one during council meetings. Through this interpretation, messages sent to a council member's personal device at home are not subject to FOIA, even if related to public business, but messages created during council meetings are subject to FOIA. Additionally, the court noted that a quorum of individual members constitutes a public body capable of making binding decisions. A communication becomes a record of a public body if sent to enough members to establish a quorum, and it may also be subject to disclosure when sent to a government-owned account.

This was the first court decision in Illinois to find that private messages were subject to disclosure under FOIA, reflecting a growing consensus interpreting freedom of information laws elsewhere in the United States. The city announced that it intended to comply with the court's ruling, noting that there were "very few documents" to release, and did not plan to appeal the case any further.

== Reactions and subsequent developments ==
Illinois Policy, a conservative advocacy group, praised the ruling as "a victory for increased transparency in government", noting that the state's Open Meetings Act (Note: Open Meetings Act (5 ILCS 120/1 et seq.)) also requires transparency on what takes place during public meetings. Frank LoMonte of the Student Press Law Center regarded the court's decision as "a positive step for accountability", but noted that its effects are meaningful only if public officials follow retention guidelines for any government-related messages on their personal devices.

Because of the ambiguity in FOIA, the court recommended that the Illinois General Assembly expressly amend FOIA if it intended messages stored on personal devices to be subject to disclosure. It also urged local governments to enact their own rules prohibiting city council members from using their personal devices during public meetings. Legal experts noted that the ruling's implications on local governments remain uncertain. John M. O'Driscoll, a local government attorney, has advised public bodies across Illinois to review their practices and ordinances to avoid having to disclose private communications. He also urged public officials to refrain from using their phones during public meetings, but this may prove difficult as officials heavily rely on their personal devices to conduct public business. O'Driscoll said that responding to FOIA requests for electronic communications remains difficult, and subsequent scenarios may be addressed by future litigation on a case-by-case basis.

The court's decision left room for interpretation in other contexts. The disclosure requirements for council members was limited because a city council technically is not acting as a public body until it has convened a meeting to conduct its business. The applicability of City of Champaign to employees (rather than elected officials) of a public body remains unclear. Attorney Matt Topic, a FOIA expert based in Chicago, suggested that executive branch employees may still be required to disclose their records because they act on the public body's behalf. The University of Illinois System cited such ambiguity when it revealed in 2015 that it had failed to disclose emails stored on the private accounts of Phyllis Wise, chancellor of the university at Urbana-Champaign. An internal investigation had found that Wise intentionally evaded FOIA by using her personal account when discussing sensitive topics (such as the Steven Salaita hiring controversy) and subsequently deleting those emails.

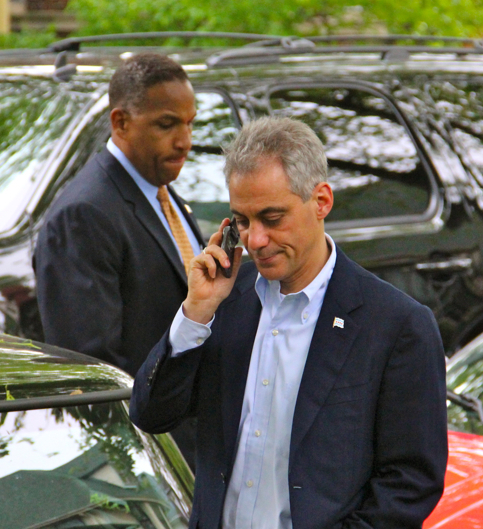
A court ordered Chicago Mayor Rahm Emanuel to disclose messages related to public business stored on his private devices.

In May 2016, the Circuit Court of Cook County cited City of Champaign when it ruled that personal emails of Chicago Mayor Rahm Emanuel may be subject to disclosure, even when stored on private devices. Later that year, the Attorney General's office revisited this issue by issuing Public Access Opinion 16‑006, deciding that officers of the Chicago Police Department were required to release their private emails about the police-involved murder of Laquan McDonald. Journalists also pointed towards similar public access issues during the administration of Illinois Governor Bruce Rauner and the Hillary Clinton email controversy. In 2020, the First District of the Appellate Court ordered the release of correspondence held on private devices of several Chicago officials, including the mayor, his staff, and the public health commissioner. In that ruling, the court noted that City of Champaign held "that personal communications are at least sometimes public records".

In 2017, the General Assembly considered two bills, which appeared to be in response to City of Champaign and Public Access Opinion 16‑006. One bill would have made it more difficult to obtain records not already in the control of a public body. Another bill would have amended the Local Records Act (Note: Local Records Act (50 ILCS 205/1 et seq.)) to explicitly state that all emails sent or received by government officials and employees are public records, even when using a personal email address. The latter bill also would have required public officials and employees to use government-issued email addresses, and forward any emails related to public business on personal accounts to their governmental accounts. Both bills expired in January 2019 without becoming law.
