= White Oaks Mall =

White Oaks Mall may refer to:

- White Oaks Mall (Springfield, Illinois)
- White Oaks Mall (London, Ontario)
