= Illinois Public Access Counselor =

Bureau under Illinois Attorney General

Public Access Bureau

Bureau overview
- Formed: December 2004
- Jurisdiction: Government of Illinois
- Headquarters: Springfield, Illinois
- Bureau executive: Leah Bartelt, Public Access Counselor
- Parent department: Illinois Attorney General
- Website: https://www.illinoisattorneygeneral.gov/open-and-honest-government/pac/

The Illinois Public Access Counselor (PAC) is an attorney in the office of the Illinois Attorney General who is responsible for enforcing the state's Freedom of Information Act (FOIA) and Open Meetings Act (OMA). The PAC is the head of the Public Access Bureau, a group of more than one dozen attorneys who process complaints against public bodies and provide education to the public on Illinois' transparency laws.

== Background ==
The Freedom of Information Act (FOIA) is an Illinois statute that grants to all persons the right to copy and inspect public records in the state. The law applies to executive and legislative bodies of state government, units of local government, and other entities defined as "public bodies". All records related to governmental business are presumed to be open for inspection by the public, except for information specifically exempted from disclosure by law. Once a person submits a request to inspect public records, the public body is required to respond within deadlines specified by FOIA. Public bodies are authorized to deny access to certain types of information enumerated by FOIA and other statutes.

The Open Meetings Act (OMA) is a related Illinois statute that grants to all persons the right to attend meetings in which public business is discussed. "Public bodies", defined similarly as in FOIA, are required to provide advance notice of meetings to the public and maintain minutes for public inspection. All discussions of public business are presumed to be open to the public, except for matters specifically exempted by law. OMA also requires public bodies to allow public comment at every meeting.

Persons alleging a violation of FOIA or OMA may file a complaint with the PAC or the Illinois circuit courts.

== Process ==
If a public body denies a FOIA request, the requester may appeal to the PAC within 60 days of the FOIA denial. However, FOIA requests to the General Assembly or its subsidiary bodies may not be appealed to the PAC. The PAC may issue a binding opinion within 60 days of receiving the request for review, and this timeline may be extended by an additional 21 days. If a member of the public believes that a public body has violated OMA, that person must file a complaint with the PAC within 60 days of the alleged violation. The timeline for the PAC to make a decision under OMA is similar to that under FOIA.

If the PAC issues a binding opinion, the result is binding on the requester and the public body, but either side may continue to appeal in court under administrative review. Binding opinions are rare, as they are issued for only less than half of one percent of complaints submitted to the PAC. Since binding opinions are subject to legal challenge in the courts, the PAC is intentionally conservative in issuing them, seeing itself as an alternative to litigation. The PAC generally issues binding opinions on "issues of broad public interest", and is careful to research each case to ensure that its opinions are upheld upon judicial review. Journalists and news organizations are more likely than private citizen requesters to receive a binding opinion.

When the PAC declines to issue a binding opinion, it is no longer bound by any statutory deadlines to resolve the matter. It may issue a non-binding or advisory opinion, resolve the dispute through mediation, or decide to take no further action on the matter. When the PAC chooses to resolve a complaint informally, it is more likely that the PAC would have ruled against the public body anyway. Usually, cases are informally resolved once the public body releases records that should not have been withheld in the first place. Requesters often wait months or years before their appeals are resolved by the PAC. Of the more than 28,000 appeals filed with the PAC from January 2010 through August 2018, over 3,800 appeals took more than one year to resolve, and about 500 took more than four years to resolve.

The PAC maintains a dataset to internally track all requests for review. Each case is labeled with one of 32 codes, to indicate the "disposition" or outcome of each complaint. Dispositions can be substantive or not. Non-substantive dispositions include complaints that were resolved through agreement or mediation, withdrawn, untimely, or otherwise procedurally defective. Dispositions can also be non-substantive because the complaints were not directed at public bodies, because a lawsuit has been filed concerning the same issue, or because the public body responded to the FOIA request after the PAC intervened. Cases that are still under review are marked "open". Substantive dispositions, specifically for FOIA, include the following:

- FOIA non-violation, request for review is unfounded – The PAC determines that it does not need to initiate a formal review, and finds that the public body did not violate FOIA. These complaints are found to have no merit, or the requester has not provided facts to allege an actual violation of FOIA.
- FOIA non-violation, public body's asserted exemption is proper – The PAC determines that the public body properly asserted an exemption when denying a FOIA request.
- FOIA violation, PAC disagrees with public body's asserted exemption – The PAC determines that the public body improperly asserted an exemption to deny a FOIA request.

Of the cases resolved with substantive dispositions, the PAC has found roughly 30% to have been FOIA violations. Top offenders include the City of East St. Louis, University of Illinois system, City of Joliet, Illinois Department of Central Management Services, Illinois Department of Transportation, and Chicago Police Department. For OMA requests for review, disposition codes are generic and do not identify the specific requirements of OMA that were alleged to have been violated.

== History ==
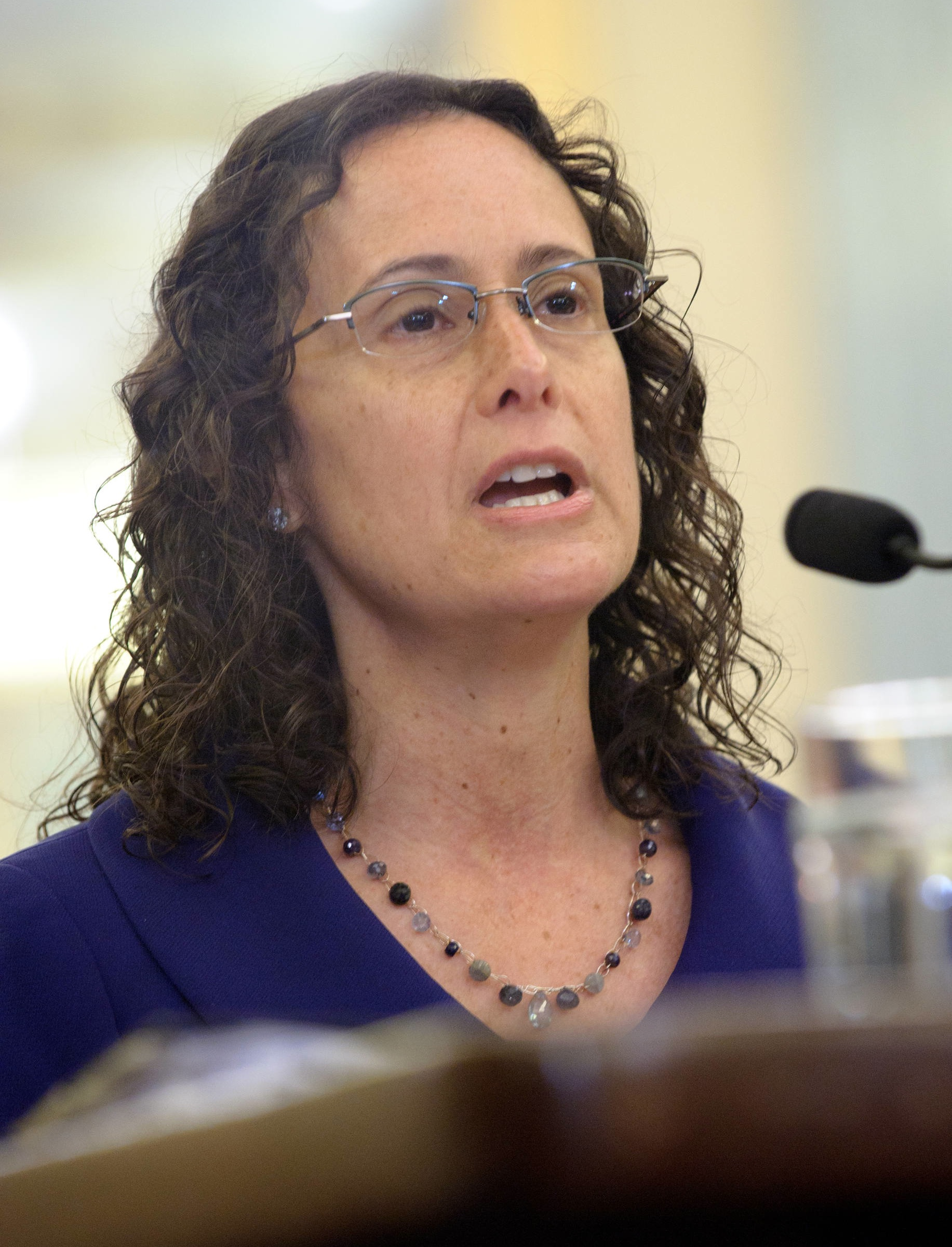
Attorney General Lisa Madigan created the Public Access Counselor position in 2004.

Attorney General Lisa Madigan established the Public Access and Opinions Division in December 2004, and appointed Terry Mutchler as the first Public Access Counselor. The PAC could mediate disputes and write letters to encourage public bodies to comply with FOIA. However, the PAC had no formal enforcement powers, and its capacities were merely advisory and non-binding. This left the practical burden on requesters to pursue lengthy, time-consuming litigation. Requesters were not likely to appeal to the courts, creating a natural deterrent that public bodies leveraged to avoid full compliance.

The PAC received additional enforcement powers on January 1, 2010, after the passage of Public Act 96-542. With this new law, requesters were allowed to submit "requests for review" to the PAC, which became a more viable alternative to litigation because it provided a level "playing field" between two government agencies (the PAC and the public body being challenged), rather than pitting private citizens against public bodies with more resources. The General Assembly also authorized the PAC to issue subpoenas and file lawsuits in the circuit courts to force compliance with a binding opinion or prevent violations of the law.

The Illinois States Attorneys Association objected to the changes, as the Attorney General and the PAC acquired an expanded role under the new law. The Association suggested that the role of the state's attorney should be expanded instead. As of 2019, the PAC employed 13 full-time attorneys, three supervisors, and four support staff.

From 2013 through 2021, the PAC processed approximately 3,500 FOIA complaints and 360 OMA complaints per year, and that volume dropped by over 10 percent in 2022. The Attorney General's office attributed the decline to better training for public officials.

== Reception ==
After receiving its new enforcement powers, the PAC quickly became backlogged, handling nearly 6,500 requests for review from January 2010 through April 2011. Requesters often had to wait over 3 months before their appeals were resolved. Nonetheless, supporters viewed the backlog as a sign of growing pains and an expected outcome of the new enforcement mechanisms. Terry Pastika, executive director of the Citizen Advocacy Center, viewed the new appeals process as an "enormous improvement" from before, despite the delays.

Although the PAC may issue subpoenas to obtain more information, it has declined to exercise its authority to do so. ProPublica and the Chicago Sun-Times published a report on the PAC in 2018, labeling it "an overwhelmed and inconsistent enforcement system". The PAC has rarely used its full authority to enforce FOIA and OMA, and violators have faced few consequences for ignoring the PAC's opinions. Bruce Rushton, a journalist for the Illinois Times, suggested "pull[ing] the plug on the PAC's office", contending that the Attorney General's office is too politicized to resolve disputes concerning other public bodies.

ProPublica further criticized the PAC's weak enforcement actions in the aftermath of the murder of Laquan McDonald by an officer of the Chicago Police Department in October 2014. A lawsuit filed in the Circuit Court of Cook County was instrumental in securing the release of a video recording of McDonald's murder in November 2015, while the PAC's involvement was delayed and its opinion non-binding. By 2018, journalists and citizen activists filed at least 10 appeals to the PAC after Chicago officials blocked requests for records related to the incident, but most appeals stayed open for several months or years. The PAC issued one binding opinion in this matter, Public Access Opinion 16‑006, ordering the Police Department to release private emails from officers related to McDonald's murder.
