= Bon Ton (brothel) =

New Zealand escort agency chain

- Type: Private
- Industry: Sex industry
- Headquarters: New Zealand
- Number of locations: 1 agency
- Area served: Queenstown
- Key people: Jennifer Souness
- Products: Escort Agency
- Services: Sexual services
- Owner: Jennifer Souness
- Website: www.bonton.co.nz

Bon Ton is a high-end escort agency chain in New Zealand. It initially operated two escort agencies - one in the capital city Wellington and a second in the nation's largest city Auckland. It now operates in Queenstown. Bon Ton is a French term which means "good taste". The luxury escort agency is owned by Jennifer Souness, a former model who modeled for various European fashion labels.

In a feature story on prostitution in New Zealand, the BBC News Online described Bon Ton as "an ideal showcase for New Zealand-style liberalisation". The escort agency is characterized by quality rooms resembling luxury suites and a professionally maintained office. Louise Jolliffe writing in The Wellington Guide asserted that Bon Ton looks closer to "a luxury lodge than a brothel".

All the women working at Bon Ton have other occupations and work as escorts on a part-time basis. According to the BBC News Online, the escorts working at Bon Ton say they find the work environment respectful.

Bon Ton bills itself as "a boutique agency for a select clientele" and states that it intends "to provide a tasteful and discreet haven for gentlemen to enjoy the attentions of elegant, beautifully groomed, intelligent women". The website of the escort agency makes invitation calls to potential clients to come into what is described as a "safe and secret oasis where the outside world melts away".

The Bon Ton website publishes biographies of their escorts. As per the requirement by the Prostitution Reform Act 2003, Bon Ton has a safe sex policy that requires customers to wear condoms.

Two members of the United Kingdom-based Women's Institute (WI), who visited various brothels throughout the world to check their quality and were featured in a BBC documentary titled The WI And The Search For The Perfect Brothel, voted Bon Ton the world's best.
