= Lisa Holder White =

American judge (born 1968)

Justice of the Illinois Supreme Court
- Incumbent
- Assumed office July 8, 2022
- Preceded by: Rita Garman

Personal details
- Born: 1968 (age 57–58) Decatur, Illinois, U.S.
- Party: Republican
- Education: Lewis University (BA); University of Illinois, Urbana-Champaign (JD)

Lisa Holder White (born 1968) is an African-American lawyer who has served as a justice of the Illinois Supreme Court since July 2022. She previously served as a judge of the Illinois Fourth District Appellate Court from 2013 to 2022, and as a trial judge in the Illinois Sixth Judicial Circuit Court from 2001 to 2013. She is the first Black woman to be elevated to the Illinois Supreme Court.

== Early life and education ==
Holder White was born in 1968 in Decatur, Illinois. She graduated magna cum laude from Lewis University in 1990 with a Bachelor of Arts degree in political science. She received her Juris Doctor from the University of Illinois College of Law in 1993.

== Legal career ==
Upon graduation from law school, Holder White served as an assistant state's attorney for Macon County. While there, she handled various matters ranging from traffic to criminal felony cases. Subsequently, Holder White served as an assistant public defender litigating on behalf of those charged with criminal offenses and representing abused and neglected juveniles. Prior to her appointment to the bench, Holder White was in private practice at the Decatur law firm formerly known as Brinkoetter & White.

== Judicial career ==
In 2001, Holder White was appointed to the office of associate judge in the Sixth Judicial Circuit Court. In 2008, she was appointed by the Supreme Court as a circuit judge of the same court and was elected to that position in November 2010.

On December 20, 2012, Holder White was assigned to the Fourth District Appellate Court to fill the vacancy left by the death of Judge John McCullough. On January 14, 2013, Holder White was sworn into office, becoming the first African American to be seated on the court. Holder White was subsequently appointed to the same seat in July 2014 and ultimately elected to that office in November 2014.

=== Appointment to supreme court ===
On May 10, 2022, Holder White was appointed to the Illinois Supreme Court to fill the vacancy left by the retirement of Justice Rita Garman. Holder White was sworn in by Justice Mary Jane Theis on July 7, 2022. Her appointment was effective July 8, 2022, and she became the first African American woman to serve on the court. The Illinois Supreme Court appointed Eugene Doherty, a Judge of the Seventeenth Judicial Circuit, to the position vacated by Holder White for a period effective July 14, 2022, and terminating December 2, 2024.

== Memberships and associations ==
Holder White is a member of the following associations and boards:

- Decatur Bar Association
- Illinois Judges Association
- Community Foundation of Macon County Board
- Millikin University Board

== Personal life ==
Holder White is married to her husband James and they have two children. She is a Republican.

== Electoral history ==
=== 4th district (McCullough vacancy) ===
Holder White was assigned to the Fourth District Appellate Court effective January 2013 to fill the vacancy left by the death of John T. McCullough. She ran unopposed in both the Republican primary and general election. This was a regular election, as McCullough's term ended in 2014.

==== Republican primary ====
Illinois Appellate Court 4th district (McCullough vacancy) Republican primary
Party	Candidate	Votes	%
Republican	Lisa Holder White	115,841	100
Total votes		115,841	100

==== General election ====
Illinois Appellate Court 4th district (McCullough vacancy) election
Party	Candidate	Votes	%
Republican	Lisa Holder White	335,693	100
Total votes		335,693	100

== See also ==
- City of Champaign v. Madigan
- List of African-American jurists
- List of first women lawyers and judges in Illinois

Legal offices
Preceded by Rita Garman	Justice of the Illinois Supreme Court; 2022–present	Incumbent
