= Bonton =

Bonton may refer to:

- Bonton, Dallas, neighborhood in Dallas, Texas
- Bonton Group, a media/entertainment holding company
- A brand name for Lorazepam

== See also ==
- Bon Ton (disambiguation)
