= Bon Ton =

Bon Ton may refer to:

- Ton (le bon ton), a term used to refer to Britain's high society in the early 19th century
- Bon Ton (brothel), Escort Agency in New Zealand
- The Bon-Ton, a department store company based in New York, New York
- Bon Ton (play), a play by David Garrick
- "Bon ton" (song), a song by Drillionaire

== See also ==
- Bonton (disambiguation)
