= Rita Garman =

American judge

Rita B. Garman

Justice of the Illinois Supreme Court
- In office February 1, 2001 – July 7, 2022
- Preceded by: Benjamin K. Miller
- Succeeded by: Lisa Holder White

Judge of the Illinois Fourth District Appellate Court
- In office July 17, 1995 – February 1, 2001
- Preceded by: Carl A. Lund
- Succeeded by: John Turner

Circuit Judge of the Fifth Judicial Circuit Court of Illinois
- In office 1986–1995
- Preceded by: Matthew A. Jurczak
- Succeeded by: Claudia Jackson

Associate Judge of the Fifth Judicial Circuit Court of Illinois
- In office 1974–1986

Personal details
- Born: November 19, 1943 (age 82) Aurora, Illinois, U.S.
- Party: Republican
- Education: University of Illinois (BS); University of Iowa (JD)

Rita B. Garman (born November 19, 1943) is a former American judge who served as a justice of the Supreme Court of Illinois. She represented the Fourth Judicial District on the Supreme Court. She was elected by her peers to serve a three-year term as chief justice from October 26, 2013, to October 25, 2016. Garman announced on May 9, 2022, that she would retire from the Supreme Court on July 7, 2022. On May 10, 2022, the Illinois Supreme Court announced that Fourth District Appellate Justice Lisa Holder White would be appointed to succeed Garman effective July 8, 2022.

== Early life and education ==
Garman was born in Aurora, Illinois. She was valedictorian of Oswego High School in 1961.

She received her Bachelor of Science degree in economics with highest honors from the University of Illinois in 1965, Bronze Tablet. She earned her Juris Doctor degree with distinction from the University of Iowa College of Law in 1968.

== Career ==
After law school, Garman was briefly employed by the Vermilion County Legal Aid Society. Garman was an assistant state's attorney in Vermilion County, Illinois from 1969 to 1973. She later briefly worked in private practice with Sebat, Swanson, Banks, Lessen & Garman in 1973.

In 1973, she was appointed an associate judge for the Fifth Judicial Circuit, where she served for twelve years. In 1986, Garman filed to run for the judgeship being vacated by John Meyer. Garman won the general election and succeeded Matthew A. Jurczak, a retired judge and placeholder appointee. She served as the Fifth Circuit's presiding judge from 1987 until her assignment to the appellate court. Claudia Anderson was appointed to succeed Garman as a circuit judge.

Carl A. Lund retired from his position as an appellate justice and Garman was appointed to the appellate bench on July 17, 1995. She was elected to the position in November 1996. She was appointed to the Supreme Court of Illinois on February 1, 2001, and elected to the court on November 5, 2002. Representative John Turner was appointed to succeed Garman on the appellate court.

She was retained by the voters in 2012 for a term that ends in 2022. While on the Supreme Court, Garman also established a special committee on child custody issues and still serves as its liaison.

She is a member of the Vermilion County Bar Association, Illinois State Bar Association, and Iowa State Bar Association, as well as the Illinois Judges' Association.

== See also ==
- List of female state supreme court justices
- List of first women lawyers and judges in Illinois

Legal offices
Preceded by Benjamin K. Miller	Justice of the Supreme Court of Illinois; 2001–2022	Succeeded by Lisa Holder White
