= Illinois Public Access Opinion 16-006 =

Illinois Attorney General opinion

Illinois Public Access Opinion 16‑006
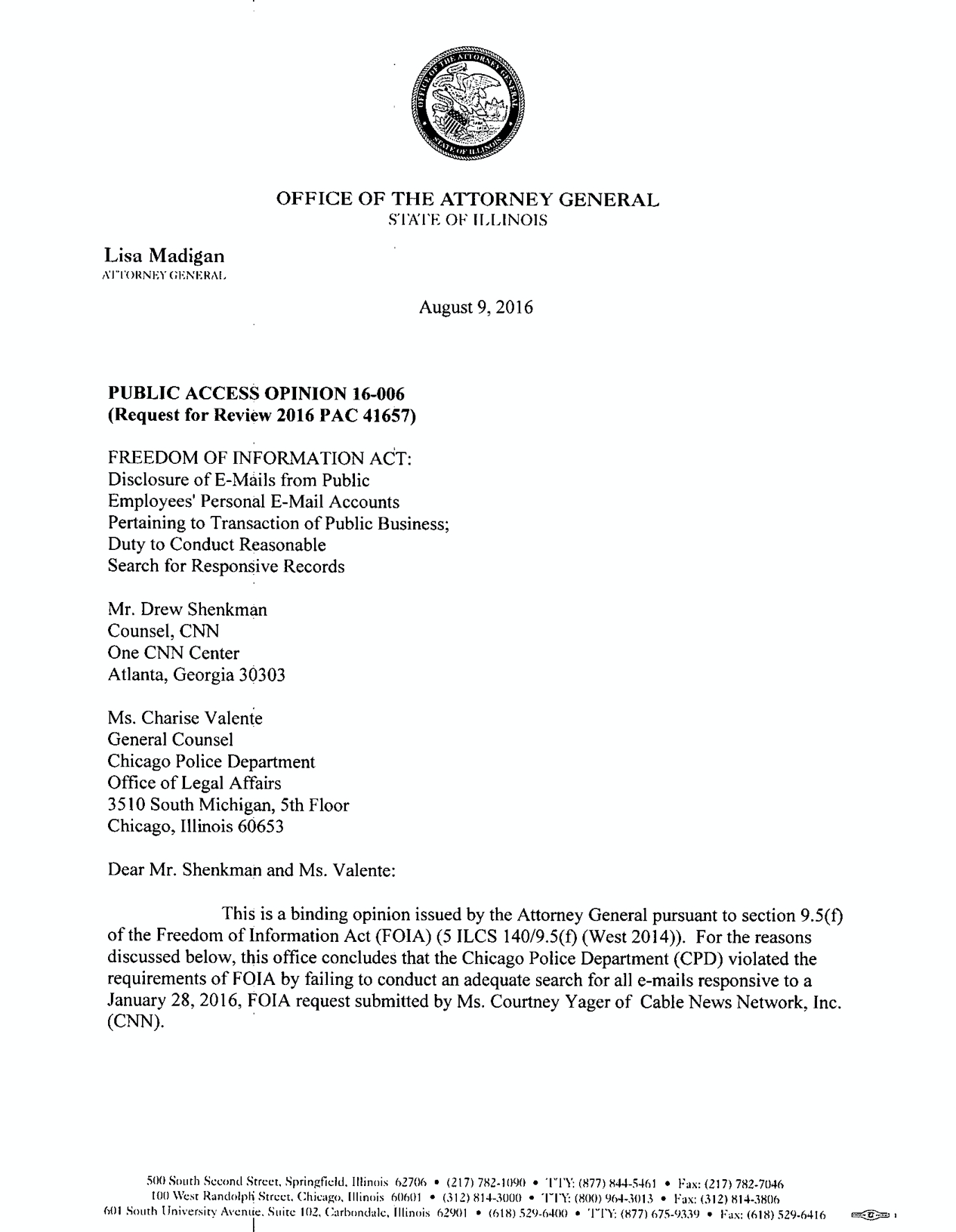
- First page of the binding opinion, addressed to the attorneys representing CNN and the Chicago Police Department
- Date effective: August 9, 2016
- Author(s): Lisa Madigan, Illinois Attorney General
- Subject: Illinois Freedom of Information Act
- Purpose: Determine whether the Chicago Police Department lawfully withheld emails regarding the murder of Laquan McDonald which were on police officers' personal email accounts

Official website
- Public Access Opinion 16‑006

Illinois Public Access Opinion 16‑006 is a binding opinion of the Illinois Attorney General pursuant to that state's Freedom of Information Act (FOIA). Issued in 2016 in the aftermath of the police murder of Laquan McDonald, the opinion addressed a public records request from Cable News Network (CNN) for emails by officers of the Chicago Police Department (CPD) related to the incident, which were on the officers' personal email accounts. After the CPD denied CNN's request, the Attorney General's office, led by Lisa Madigan, ruled that the police officers' email messages about McDonald's murder were subject to public disclosure, even though those messages were communicated on personal accounts outside of the police department's email servers.

A prior appellate court decision in City of Champaign v. Madigan had established that communications about public business on personal electronic devices may be subject to disclosure. However, the scope of that decision applied only during public meetings convened by a city council or other public body, and it was unclear how it would apply to employees. In Public Access Opinion 16‑006, the Attorney General found that the police officers were acting on behalf of the police department, making their messages public records of the police department. Nonetheless, CNN never received the emails that it had requested, even after it went to court to enforce the Attorney General's opinion.

== Background ==
On October 20, 2014, Laquan McDonald was fatally shot in Chicago by police officer Jason Van Dyke. Preliminary reports by the Chicago Police Department (CPD) and Van Dyke claimed that McDonald had pointed a knife and moved towards Van Dyke, forcing the officer to shoot in self defense. The shooting was recorded by a CPD dashboard camera. However, the video was not initially available to the public, and a lawsuit was filed in the Circuit Court of Cook County to secure the video's release. On November 19, 2015, the court ordered CPD to release the video, and CPD complied five days later. By then, 13 months had passed since the shooting. The video revealed that McDonald had a knife in his hand, but had been walking away from police when he was shot. Van Dyke shot McDonald 16 times, most of them while McDonald was already on the ground.

On January 28, 2016, Courtney Yager, a producer for Cable News Network (CNN), submitted an Illinois Freedom of Information Act (FOIA) request to CPD for "all emails related to Laquan McDonald from Police Department email accounts and personal email accounts where business was discussed" for twelve CPD officers, including Van Dyke and others involved in the case. The request covered emails from October 19 through October 24, 2014 (around the date of the shooting), and November 19 through November 29, 2015 (around the date of the circuit court's order, and the video's subsequent release). CPD provided a large number of emails from the police officers' CPD-issued email accounts, but CPD failed to search the officers' personal email accounts, despite CNN's request. The Associated Press surmised that CNN was trying to determine whether the officers coordinated efforts to cover up the true circumstances behind McDonald's death.

On April 28, 2016, CNN attorney Drew Shenkman appealed CPD's omission to the Public Access Counselor, the bureau of the Illinois Attorney General responsible for enforcing FOIA. CNN's situation was not unique. By 2018, journalists and citizen activists had filed at least 10 appeals to the Public Access Counselor after Chicago officials blocked requests for records related to the murder of McDonald.

== Case law ==
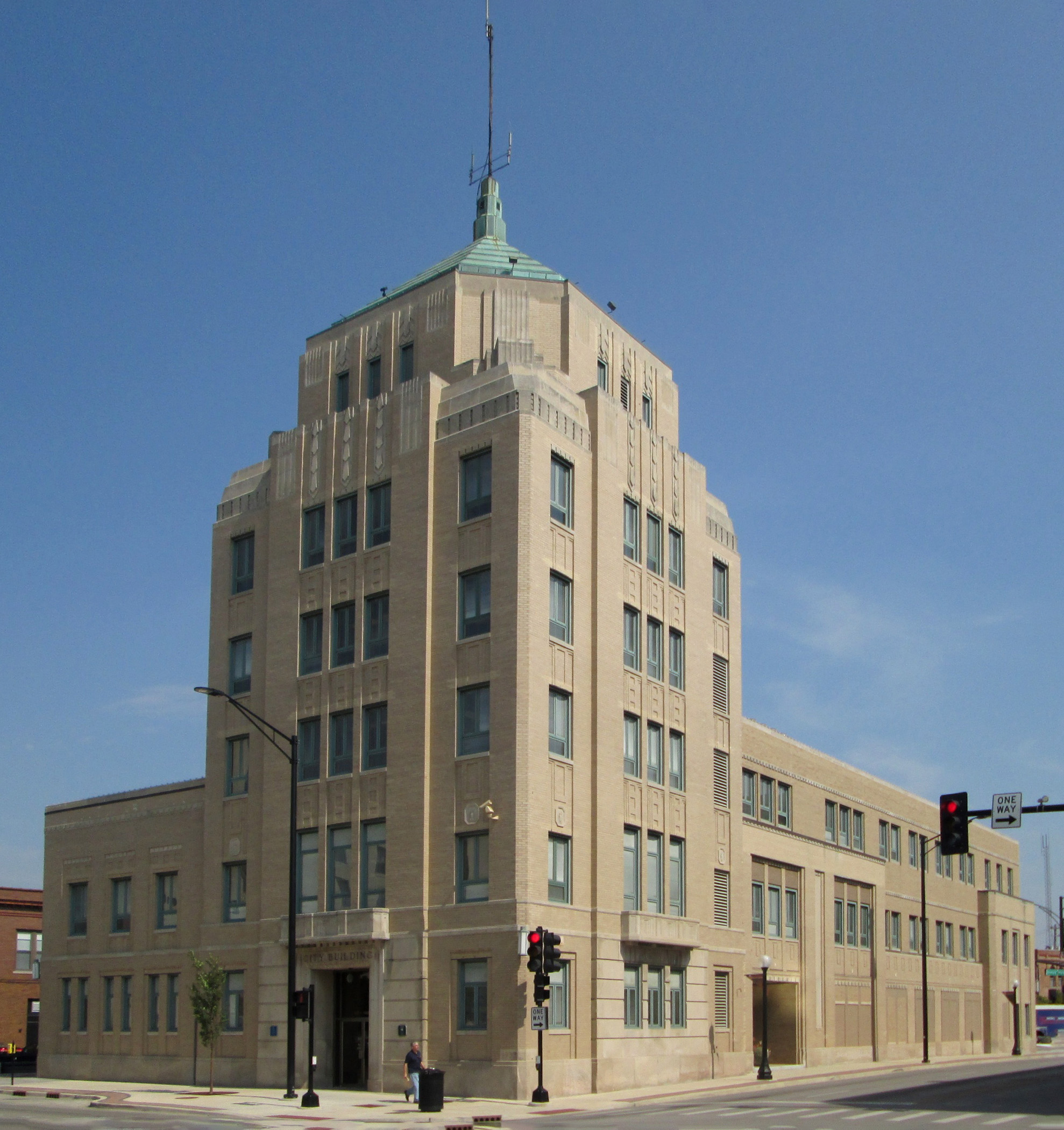
City Building of Champaign, Illinois

Public bodies in Illinois, including CPD, are required under FOIA to make all public records open to disclosure. Public records include all emails "pertaining to the transaction of public business, regardless of physical form or characteristics, having been prepared by or for, or having been or being used by, received by, in the possession of, or under the control of any public body".

In City of Champaign v. Madigan, a 2013 case, the Illinois Appellate Court considered a FOIA dispute regarding elected officials who were observed using their cell phones during a city council meeting to communicate with each other. The court found that the communications in question must be disclosed to the public, as long as they pertained to public business, because the city council had collectively formed a public body upon convening a council meeting. Therefore, the court ruled that the communications, though stored on personal devices, must be disclosed. This was the first court decision in Illinois to find that messages sent on private devices were subject to disclosure under FOIA.

However, the court's decision left room for interpretation in other contexts. The court found that, while city council members collectively form a public body during council meetings, they are not individually considered a public body. Therefore, a council member would not necessarily have to disclose messages received from constituents on their personal electronic devices while at home. Still, the applicability of City of Champaign to employees (rather than elected officials) of a public body remained unclear. Attorney Matt Topic, a FOIA expert based in Chicago, suggested that executive branch employees may still be required to disclose their records because they act on the public body's behalf.

The University of Illinois System cited such ambiguity when it revealed in 2015 that it had failed to disclose emails stored on the private accounts of Phyllis Wise, chancellor of the university at Urbana-Champaign. An internal investigation had found that Wise intentionally evaded FOIA by using her personal account when discussing sensitive topics (such as the Steven Salaita hiring controversy) and subsequently deleting those emails. In May 2016, the Circuit Court of Cook County cited City of Champaign when it ruled that personal emails of Chicago Mayor Rahm Emanuel may be subject to disclosure, even when stored on private devices.

== Opinion ==
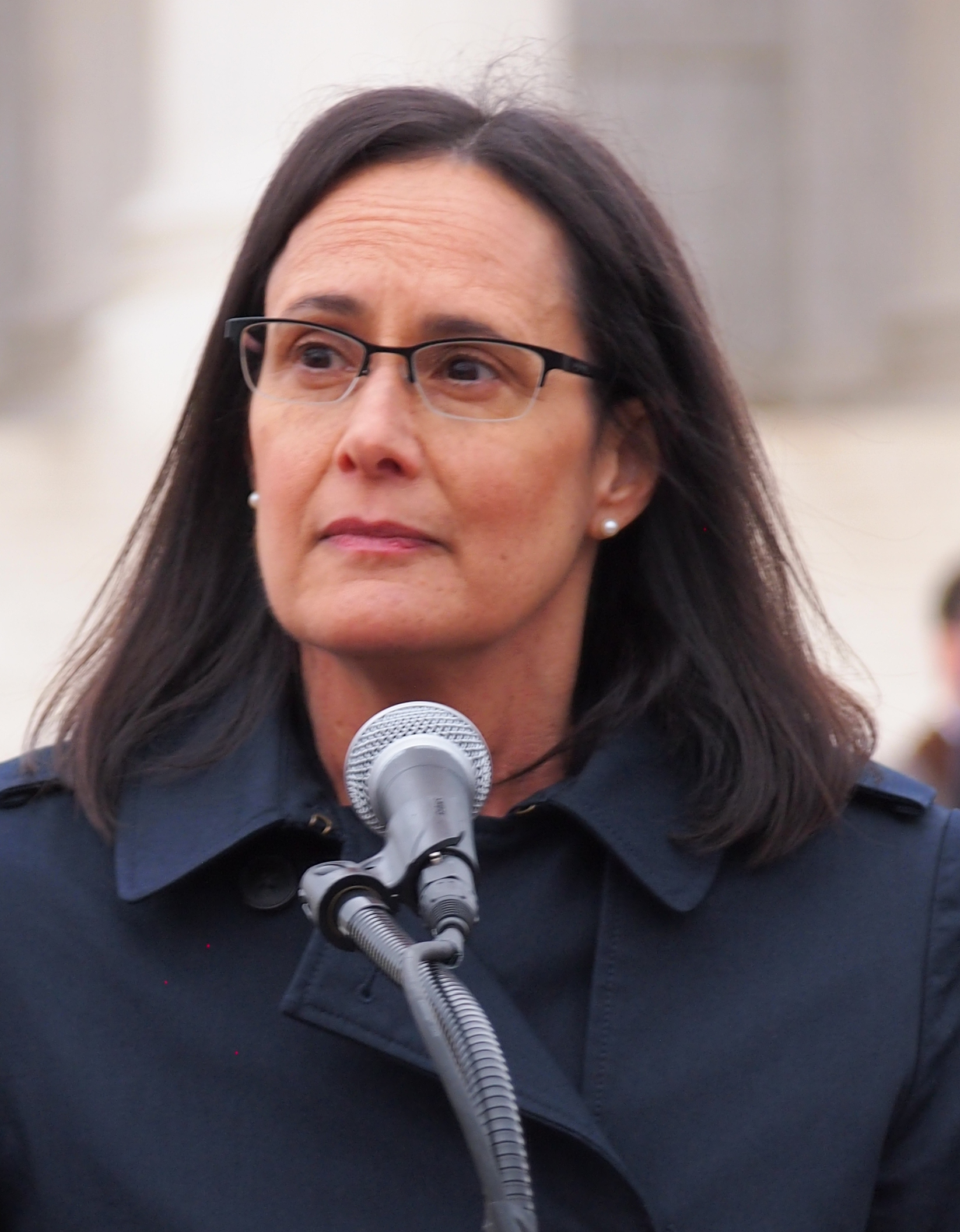
Lisa Madigan, Illinois Attorney General, author of the opinion

Relying on the appellate court's ruling in City of Champaign, CPD argued that the emails were sent by individual officers, and could not be considered public records because they were not prepared by or for CPD. Further, CPD argued that the emails were not stored on CPD's servers, and therefore were not under the police department's control.

The Attorney General's office, led by Lisa Madigan, issued its ruling on August 9, 2016. (Note: The opinion was signed on Madigan's behalf by Michael J. Luke, counsel to the Attorney General.) It rejected CPD's arguments, ruling that officers' emails about public business are subject to disclosure, even when sent on private devices. To determine whether an email pertains to public business, the Attorney General stated that one must focus on the content of the email, not on how it is sent. The opinion cited a federal appellate court decision, Competitive Enterprise Institute v. Office of Science and Technology Policy, (Note: Competitive Enterprise Institute v. Office of Science and Technology Policy, No. 15-5128 (D.C. Cir. July 5, 2016).) noting that "an agency always acts through its employees and officials. If one of them possesses what would otherwise be agency records, the records do not lose their agency character just because the official who possesses them takes them out the door." Otherwise, public employees could avoid public scrutiny by storing their records on private accounts, contrary to the intent of the Illinois General Assembly to ensure "public access to full and complete information regarding the affairs of government".

Additionally, CPD suggested that searching the personal emails would violate the officers' personal privacy. The Attorney General rejected this argument as well, noting FOIA's explicit statement that "the disclosure of information that bears on the public duties of public employees and officials shall not be considered an invasion of personal privacy".

CPD also countered that it could not compel employees to grant CPD access to personal email accounts. However, the opinion noted that CPD did not necessarily have to obtain access to the officers' personal email accounts to perform an automated search. Instead, CPD could meet its legal obligations by ordering the officers to search their own personal accounts themselves, and to turn over relevant emails to CPD.

The ruling was a binding opinion, a rare power that is exercised by the Attorney General in only less than 0.5 percent of complaints submitted to the Public Access Counselor. (Note: Most complaints to the Public Access Counselor are resolved by advisory opinions that are not legally binding on the parties.) CPD was required to comply by searching the officers' personal email accounts, or file for administrative review in the Circuit Court of Cook or Sangamon County within 35 days.

== Appeal ==
CPD appealed the ruling in the Circuit Court of Cook County, (Note: City of Chicago v. Attorney General of the State of Illinois and Cable News Network, Inc., Docket No. 2016-CH-12085 (Circuit Court, Cook County).) maintaining that the officers' personal emails are not subject to public disclosure. CPD contended that the Attorney General incorrectly considered individual police officers to be the same as the collective police department, thereby reaching the erroneous conclusion that individual officers conduct public business as a public body when communicating on privately owned, personal email accounts. Furthermore, CPD argued that the ruling was too broad because it obligated CPD to search the personal emails and personal devices of all employees. In CPD's view, FOIA does not impose such a requirement, as the law does not provide a way for a public body to force its employees to grant access to personal email accounts.

CPD lost the appeal on September 20, 2017, with Judge Pamela McLean Meyerson writing, "Government operations in a free society must not be shrouded in secrecy." Meyerson also found the FOIA request to be reasonable and limited in time and scope. Nonetheless, CNN never received the emails that it had requested, even after it went to court a second time to enforce Meyerson's order. Each of the officers, individually or through their attorneys, either refused to provide emails, ignored the request, or denied having any relevant emails.

== Reactions ==
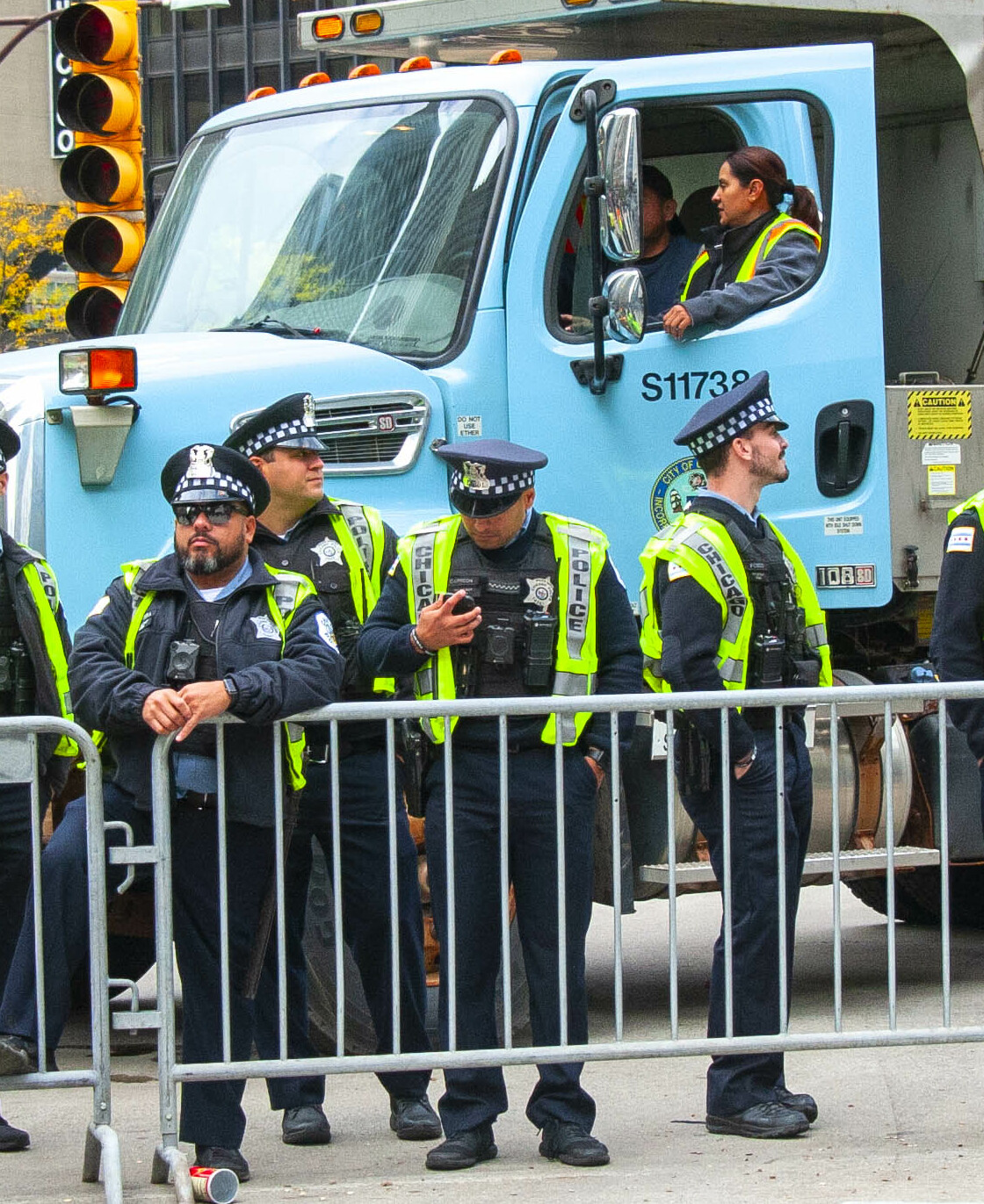
A Chicago police officer using his mobile phone in 2019

The ruling was hailed by public access advocates as an important step towards transparency in a national debate concerning access to discussions of public business on privately held electronic devices. Charles N. Davis, dean of the Grady College at the University of Georgia, commented that the opinion "correctly focuses on the question whether the communication is intended to memorialize public business ... If the opinion had come down the other way, it would send a clear signal to every public official on how to avoid public records laws. All they would have to do is get a Hotmail account and start discussing public business." Davis also suggested that the state legislature could mandate that all public business be conducted on governmental email accounts.

In addition to the previous court order regarding Emanuel's emails, journalists pointed towards similar public access issues during the administration of Illinois Governor Bruce Rauner and the Hillary Clinton email controversy. However, the Information Management Journal suggested that while the ruling applies to government employees, it still does not apply to elected officials. Benjamin Schuster, a Chicago-based attorney, criticized the Attorney General for not distinguishing between the dispute in City of Champaign v. Madigan and CPD's records at issue in this case. He also criticized the opinion for not clearly defining when a document is a public record, and for not specifying how much authority a public body has to compel employees to release private messages.

The opinion has led to concerns about potential impacts to the boundaries of privacy at the workplace, especially with the intermingling of work on personal devices and evolving attitudes towards personal privacy. Attorney Jeffrey Brown noted that public bodies should not allow officials and employees to conduct public business on private accounts and devices. Otherwise, he warned that public bodies may have to conduct a potentially cumbersome and time-consuming search for records, or a court may order the private device or account to be searched by a third party. If officials and employees continued to conduct public business on personal devices, Brown suggested that such communications should be forwarded to government accounts, to help facilitate responses to future FOIA requests. Even when a communication involves both public business and private matters, the private portions may still be redacted.

In 2017, the General Assembly considered two bills, which appeared to be in response to City of Champaign and Public Access Opinion 16‑006. One bill would have made it more difficult to obtain records not already in the control of a public body. Another bill would have amended the Local Records Act (Note: Local Records Act (50 ILCS 205/1 et seq.)) to explicitly state that all emails sent or received by government officials and employees are public records, even when using a personal email address. The latter bill also would have required public officials and employees to use government-issued email addresses, and forward any emails related to public business on personal accounts to their governmental accounts. Both bills expired in January 2019 without becoming law.
