= Benjamin K. Miller (judge) =

American judge (1936–2024)

Benjamin Miller
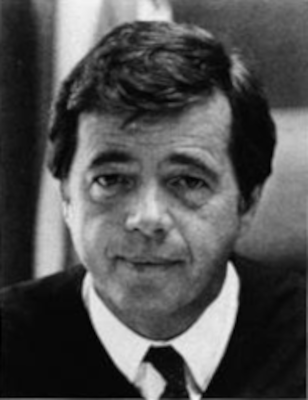

Justice of the Illinois Supreme Court
- In office December 1984 – February 2001
- Preceded by: Robert C. Underwood
- Succeeded by: Rita B. Garman

Personal details
- Born: November 5, 1936 Springfield, Illinois, U.S.
- Died: February 25, 2024 (aged 87)
- Party: Republican
- Education: Southern Illinois University (B.A.); Vanderbilt University (J.D.)
- Profession: Jurist; Attorney

Benjamin K. Miller (November 5, 1936 – February 25, 2024) was an American judge in Illinois. He was a member of the Illinois Supreme Court from 1984 to 2001. He served as chief justice from 1991 to 1994.

== Early life ==
Miller was born November 5, 1936, in Springfield, Illinois. He earned his B.A. degree from Southern Illinois University Carbondale in 1958 where he was a member of Sigma Pi fraternity. He then earned his J.D. degree from Vanderbilt University in 1961. He returned to Springfield where he had a private practice from 1961 to 1976.

Miller became an adjunct professor at the Southern Illinois University School of Medicine in the Department of Medical Humanities in 1974.

In 1976, Miller was appointed to be a judge on the Circuit Court for the 7th Judicial Circuit by the state's Supreme Court. He was elected to that position in 1978. He served as Presiding Judge in the Criminal Felony Division of the Circuit Court in Sangamon County from 1976 to 1980. In 1981, he was elected Chief Judge of the 7th Judicial Circuit and served in that capacity until 1982. It was during this time that he presided over the murder cases of inmates involved the 1978 riot at Pontiac Correctional Center. He was elected to the 4th District Appellate Court in 1982.

== Supreme Court ==
In 1984, he was elected to a ten-year term to the Supreme Court of Illinois defeating Democratic candidate and fellow Appellate Judge Jim Craven. Miller won re-election in 1994.

Miller represented the 4th judicial district, which runs across central Illinois.

While on the Supreme Court he served as chair of the Illinois Courts Commission from 1988 to 1991. He also dissented from the majority in a case that would have prevented the Harold Washington Party from being on the ballot in 1990. The U.S. Supreme Court used some of Miller's arguments in overruling the state court.

In 1991, Miller was awarded an honorary Doctor of Law degree from the John Marshall Law School, and the "Carl Rolewick Memorial" award from the Lawyers' Assistance Program.

Miller was elected Chief Justice of the Court in 1991 and served until January 1, 1994. During that time, he formed the Illinois Family Violence Coordinating Council to combat domestic violence. The Justice Benjamin K. Miller Recognition Award is an award named after him and is given to honor outstanding members of the community and judiciary for their work in preventing family violence. He focused on expanding judicial performance evaluations statewide. He added non-attorneys to disciplinary hearing boards that ruled on lawyer misconduct. He clarified the restrictions on political activity by judges and judicial candidates by amending the Code of Judicial Conduct. He also established the Special Commission on the Administration of Justice which produced reports on the management practices and administration of the state's courts, and juvenile justice system.

In 1997 Miller was openly critical of the conduct of then Chief Justice James D. Heiple who was accused of abusing his position during traffic stops and disobeying police. He testified during Heiple's impeachment proceedings that Heiple had failed to let other court members know the seriousness of the Illinois Courts Commission's investigation. The Illinois House of Representatives panel voted not to impeach Heiple though he did step down as chief justice but remained on the bench.

Miller wrote the majority opinion for the court in overturning Andrew Wilson's original murder conviction, which denounced forced confessions and police brutality. He also wrote opinions on rulings that upheld the state's guilty but mentally ill statute and ensured privileged communications between sex assault victims and rape crisis counselors. In all, he wrote 487 opinions, participated in over 2,000 cases, and evaluated over 20,000 requests for review.

Miller retired from the court on February 1, 2001. At the time, he was the senior member of the court. He was known as a keen administrator who streamlined court activities and a moderate-to-conservative Republican.

== Retirement ==
Upon retirement, Miller sailed between Florida and South America as well as studying the developing field of bioethics. He also began practicing law again as of counsel to the 500 litigation Chicago law firm Jenner & Block appearing in front of the state's appellate and supreme courts.

In 2013 he was named to co-lead a commission with David H. Coar to draw a path to Bond Court reform. The next year the commission issued a comprehensive report detailing the problems of the system and gave forty recommendations for reform.

In February 2014, he was one of a group of Illinois lawyers who wrote an open letter to President Barack Obama asking him to close the Guantanamo Bay prison.

Miller died on February 25, 2024, at the age of 87.

== Awards ==
On Saturday, May 18, 2019, The Lincoln Academy of Illinois granted Miller the Order of Lincoln award, the highest honor bestowed by the State of Illinois.
