= The Wellington Guide =

The Wellington Guide was a Wellington, New Zealand-based lifestyle magazine. It had an Auckland edition, The Auckland Guide. The magazine ceased publication in 2011.
