= Administrative divisions of Illinois =

The administrative divisions of Illinois are counties, townships, precincts, cities, towns, villages, and special-purpose districts. The basic subdivisions of Illinois are the 102 counties. Illinois has more units of local government than any other state—over 8,000 in all. The Constitution of 1970 created, for the first time in Illinois, a type of "home rule", which allows localities to govern themselves to a certain extent. Illinois also has several types of school districts and additional units of government that oversee many other functions.

Property taxes are a major source of tax revenue for local government taxing districts. The property tax is a local tax, imposed by counties, townships, municipalities, school districts, and special taxation districts. The property tax in Illinois is imposed only on real property. Illinois counties, townships, cities, and villages may also promulgate local ordinances.

== Counties ==
The basic subdivisions of Illinois are the 102 counties. Cook County is the only home rule county.

== Townships and precincts ==
Of the 102 counties, 85 are divided into townships. The remaining 17 counties are divided into 255 precincts, instead of townships. In addition, all governmental functions were removed from townships in Chicago by a mayoral proclamation in 1902.

For several cities in Illinois, including Springfield and Cicero, the township and municipal governments are carried out by the same governing body.

== Municipalities ==
Municipal governments are the cities, villages, and incorporated towns. The minimum size for incorporation as a city is 2,500, and the minimum size for incorporation as a village varies by the county population. Municipalities having a population above 25,000 automatically have home rule status, whereas smaller municipalities have the option via referendums.

== School districts ==
Illinois has several types of school districts:

- Chicago Public Schools
- Common school districts
- Community college districts (the Illinois Community College System)
- Community high school districts
- Community unit school districts
- Non-high school districts
- Special charter school districts
- Township high school districts

Elected boards of education and boards of trustees (in the case of community college districts) govern these districts, except for the Chicago Public Schools and the City Colleges of Chicago, for which the boards are appointed by the Mayor with the approval of the Chicago City Council, and the special charter districts, which may have elected or appointed boards. The Illinois Board of Higher Education (IBHE) is the administrative agency with responsibility for overseeing all higher education in Illinois. With regards to the Illinois Community College System, the Illinois Community College Board (ICCB) is the state coordinating board for community colleges.

Area vocational centers and special education cooperatives may be formed by joint agreement between two or more school districts. A board consisting of representatives of each participating school district governs each entity of these two types. Educational service regions replaced the former county school units administered by county superintendents. Each region originally served one county but now may serve multiple counties because of minimum population requirements. Each region is headed by a regional superintendent of schools and is also governed by a regional board of trustees; the latter deal primarily with district boundary changes. Township land commissioners manage school lands and funds in certain counties. Educational service centers are established by the state board of education and function primarily to coordinate and provide special and ordinary services to affiliated school districts. These service centers are governed by boards consisting of members appointed by the regional superintendent.

== Special districts ==
Special purpose districts in Illinois are forms of local government that are responsible for a narrow set of responsibilities. Illinois has the most special purpose districts of any U.S. state. The exact number depends on how one defines a “special purpose district.” The United States Census Bureau has determined that Illinois has 3,227 special purpose governments as of June 30, 2012. The Office of the Illinois Comptroller, which uses a broader definition that includes special districts without budget autonomy, determined the state has 4,755 as of December 2015.

== See also ==
- List of census-designated places in Illinois
- List of unincorporated communities in Illinois
