= Illinois Department of Central Management Services =

State agency providing resources to other agencies

Department of Central Management Services
Department overview
- Jurisdiction: Illinois
- Department executive: Raven DeVaughn, Director of Central Management Services
- Website: https://cms.illinois.gov/

The Illinois Department of Central Management Services (CMS) is a code department of the Illinois state government that is generally responsible for certain state properties, acquisitions, and services.

Via the Illinois Department of Innovation & Technology (DoIT), it operates the Illinois Century Network (ICN), a network to provide internet access to state agencies, schools, universities, public libraries, and museums. In January 2023, Governor J. B. Pritzker appointed Raven A. DeVaughn as the director of Central Management Services.
