= 2018 Illinois House of Representatives election =

- November 6, 2018

All 118 seats in the Illinois House of Representatives 60 seats needed for a majority
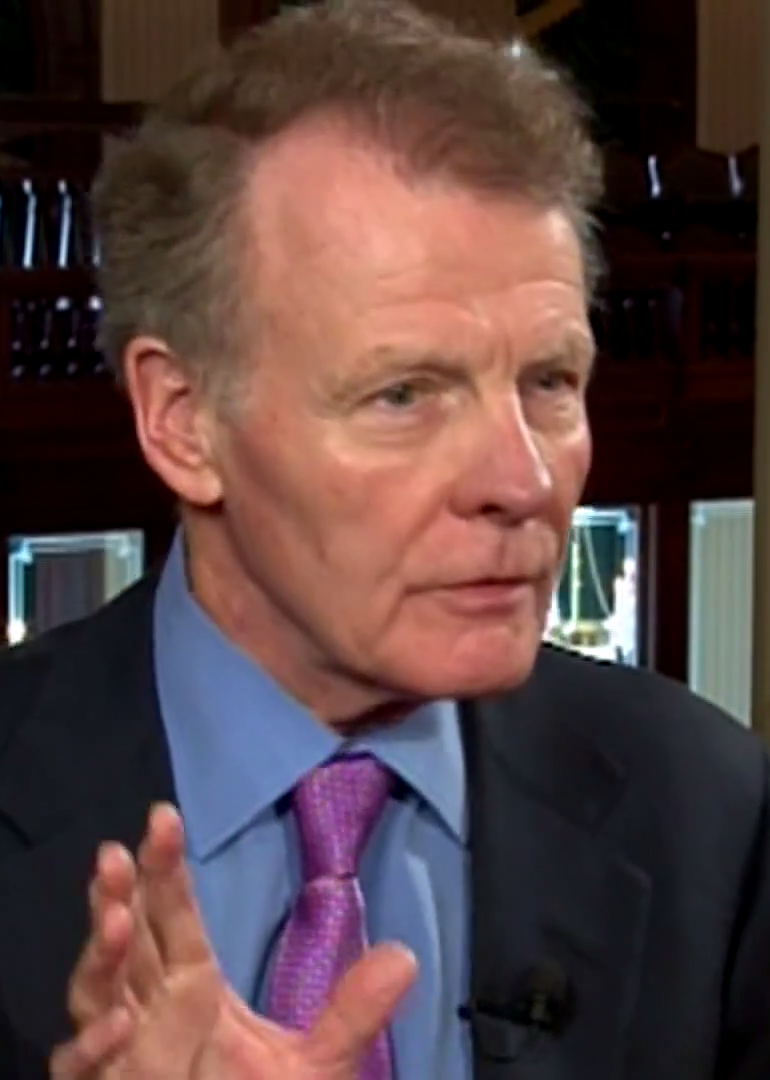

	Majority party	Minority party
Leader	Mike Madigan	Jim Durkin
Party	Democratic	Republican
Leader's seat	22nd-Chicago	82nd-Westchester
Last election	67	51
Seats won	74	44
Seat change	▲7	▼7
Popular vote	2,503,372	1,693,846
Percentage	59.64%	40.36%
Swing	▲5.77%	▼5.61%
- Democratic gain Republican gain Democratic hold Republican hold 50–60% 60–70% 70–80% >90% 50–60% 60–70% 70–80% >90%
Speaker before election
Mike Madigan
Democratic
Elected Speaker
Mike Madigan
Democratic

The 2018 elections for the Illinois House of Representatives took place on Tuesday, November 6, 2018, to elect representatives from all 118 districts. The winners of this election served in the 101st General Assembly, with seats apportioned among the states based on the 2010 United States census. The Democratic Party had held a House majority since 1997. The inauguration of the 101st General Assembly occurred on Wednesday, January 9, 2019. The Democrats flipped eight seats, while Republicans flipped one seat, resulting in a net gain of seven seats for the Democratic caucus.

The elections for Illinois's 18 congressional districts, governor and lieutenant governor, statewide constitutional officers, and the Illinois Senate were also held on this date.

== Results ==
2018 Illinois State House elections
Party	Votes	Percentage	% change	Seats before	Seats after	+/–
Democratic	2,503,372	59.64%	▲5.77%	67	74	▲7
Republican	1,693,846	40.36%	▼5.61%	51	44	▼7
Write-ins	51	0.00%	N/A	0	0	0
Totals	4,197,269	100.00%	—	118	118	—

== Retirements ==
The Illinois House of Representatives saw 28 representatives (14 Democratic and 14 Republican) choose to either retire or not run before the 2018 election.

=== Democratic retirements ===
- 4th district: Cynthia Soto: Soto ran for a seat on the Metropolitan Water Reclamation District.
- 5th district: Juliana Stratton: Stratton became J. B. Pritzker's running mate in the 2018 gubernatorial election.
- 17th district: Laura Fine: On July 28, 2017, Fine announced her intention to run for the senate seat being vacated by Daniel Biss.
- 21st district: Silvana Tabares: On June 15, 2018, Tabares was appointed as the 23rd Ward alderman of Chicago after Mike Zalewski retired from the position on May 31, 2018.
- 25th district: Barbara Flynn Currie: Majority Leader Barbara Flynn Currie, the longest tenured female legislator in Illinois history, announced she would retire.
- 34th district: Elgie Sims: After State Senator Donne Trotter announced his retirement, Sims was appointed to his seat and sworn in on January 26, 2018.
- 38th district: Al Riley: On September 26, 2017, Riley announced he would not seek reelection to a seventh term.
- 57th district: Elaine Nekritz announced she was planning to resign. Her official resignation became effective on October 2, 2017.
- 58th district: Scott Drury: Drury attempted to run for governor of Illinois, but opted to run for Illinois Attorney General after the retirement of Lisa Madigan.
- 59th district: Carol Sente: Sente announced she would not run for reelection on September 12, 2017.
- 67th district: Litesa Wallace: Wallace became Daniel Biss's running mate in the 2018 gubernatorial election.
- 85th district: Emily McAsey: McAsey resigned from her seat on June 2, 2017, to, according to the Daily Southtown, "join her husband who accepted a job out of state."
- 111th district: Dan Beiser: On August 30, 2017, Beiser announced his retirement from the Illinois House of Representatives. Beiser chose to resign in December 2017, and was succeeded by Monica Bristow.
- 118th district: Brandon Phelps: Phelps resigned in September 2017. Natalie Phelps Finnie was appointed to succeed him.

=== Republican retirements ===
- 42nd district: Jeanne Ives: In October 2017, Jeanne Ives announced her intention to run for the Republican nomination for Illinois Governor in 2018, adding that she had stopped distributing petitions for state representative.
- 47th district: Patti Bellock: On August 1, 2017, Deputy Republican Leader Bellock announced her intention to retire at the end of her term.
- 49th district: Mike Fortner: Fortner announced on August 7, 2017, that he would not seek reelection.
- 51st district: Nick Sauer: On August 1, 2018, Politico reported on Sauer allegedly using his ex-girlfriend's nude photos to catfish for seeking online relationships with men. Sauer resigned at 5 pm on the same day.
- 53rd district: David Harris: On October 4, 2017, Harris announced his retirement from the Illinois House, citing frustration from the Illinois Budget Impasse. Harris was one of the Republicans who crossed party lines to vote to end the impasse, which included an income tax increase.
- 64th district: Barbara Wheeler: Wheeler did not run for reelection in 2018.
- 65th district: Steven Andersson: On August 16, 2017, Andersson announced he would not seek reelection to the Illinois House of Representatives in 2018 during an appearance on Chicago Tonight. Andersson was one of the Republicans who voted to end the Illinois budget impasse which included an income tax increase.
- 70th district: Bob Pritchard: The 72 year old legislator announced he would retire at the end of the 100th General Assembly. Pritchard was one of the Republicans who voted to end the Illinois budget impasse which included an income tax increase.
- 89th district: Brian W. Stewart: Stewart vacated his seat to run for the senate seat being vacated by Tim Bivins.
- 99th district: Sara Wojcicki Jimenez: Wojcicki Jimenez announced she would not seek reelection in 2018.
- 101st district: Bill Mitchell: The Assistant Republican Leader announced he would not run for another term in the Illinois House on August 3, 2017.
- 104th district: Chad Hays: On July 7, 2017, Hays announced his retirement from the Illinois House, citing the budget impasse.
- 107th district: John Cavaletto: On September 18, 2017, Cavaletto announced he would not seek reelection.
- 110th district: Reggie Phillips: On September 22, 2017, Phillips announced he would not run for a third term.

== Predictions ==
Source	Ranking	As of
Governing	Safe D	October 8, 2018

== Districts 1–25 ==
=== District 1 ===
The 1st district, located in the Chicago area, includes parts of Forest View, as well as all or parts of the Chicago neighborhoods of Archer Heights, Brighton Park, Chicago Lawn, Garfield Ridge, New City, and West Elsdon. The district had been represented by Democrat Daniel J. Burke since January 9, 2013, previously serving the 23rd district from January 9, 1991, to January 9, 2013. Burke faced primary challenger Aaron Ortiz, a teacher and college counselor at Back of the Yards High School. After defeating Burke in the primary, Ortiz faced no Republican challenger.

Democratic primary
Party	Candidate	Votes	%
Democratic	Aaron Ortiz	5,636	53.12
Democratic	Daniel J. Burke (incumbent)	4,974	46.88
Total votes		10,610	100.0

General election
Party	Candidate	Votes	%
Democratic	Aaron Ortiz	16,913	100.0
Total votes		16,913	100.0
Democratic hold			

=== District 2 ===
The 2nd district includes all or parts of the Chicago neighborhoods of Armour Square, Bridgeport, Brighton Park, Lower West Side, McKinley Park, Near South Side, Near West Side, and New City. The district had been represented by Democrat Theresa Mah since January 11, 2017. Mah faced neither a Democratic challenger in the primary election nor a Republican challenger in the general election.

Democratic primary
Party	Candidate	Votes	%
Democratic	Theresa Mah (incumbent)	10,659	100.0
Total votes		10,659	100.0

General election
Party	Candidate	Votes	%
Democratic	Theresa Mah (incumbent)	20,455	100.0
Total votes		20,455	100.0
Democratic hold			

=== District 3 ===
The 3rd district, located in the Chicago area, includes parts of Elmwood Park, as well as all or parts of the Chicago neighborhoods of Austin, Belmont Cragin, Dunning, Hermosa, Logan Square, Montclare, and Portage Park. The district had been represented by Democrat Luis Arroyo since his appointment in December 2006. He was an Assistant Majority Leader of the Illinois House of Representatives during the 100th General Assembly. Arroyo faced neither a Democratic challenger in his primary nor a Republican challenger in the general election.

Democratic primary
Party	Candidate	Votes	%
Democratic	Luis Arroyo (incumbent)	7,893	100.0
Total votes		7,893	100.0

General election
Party	Candidate	Votes	%
Democratic	Luis Arroyo (incumbent)	19,782	100.0
Total votes		19,782	100.0
Democratic hold			

=== District 4 ===
The 4th district includes parts of the Chicago neighborhoods of Hermosa, Humboldt Park, Logan Square, and West Town. The district had been represented by Democrat Cynthia Soto since January 10, 2001. Soto ran for commissioner of the Metropolitan Water Reclamation District of Greater Chicago, and did not run for re-election for her seat. The Democratic primary for the 4th district seat featured four candidates.

- Iris J. Millán, community affairs liaison for Wilbur Wright College, former community development manager of St. Joseph Services, and former director of community affairs for the 1st Ward Office for the City of Chicago
- Alyx S. Pattison, campaign staffer and congressional aide to Congresswoman Jan Schakowsky; former local school council member and tutor of Jose de Diego Community Academy, Wicker Park; and former commissioner of the Cook County Commission on Women's Issues
- Delia C. Ramirez, former campaign chair for Irizarry for 26th Ward Alderman, former deputy director of the Community Renewal Society, and former executive director of the Center for Changing Lives
- Anne Shaw, community activist and civil rights attorney After winning the primary election, Ramirez faced no Republican challenger in the general election.

Democratic primary
Party	Candidate	Votes	%
Democratic	Delia Ramirez	7,120	47.99
Democratic	Iris J. Millan	3,076	20.73
Democratic	Alyx S. Pattison	2,346	15.81
Democratic	Anne Shaw	2,294	15.46
Total votes		14,836	100.0

General election
Party	Candidate	Votes	%
Democratic	Delia Ramirez	31,797	99.98
Write-in		6	0.02
Total votes		31,803	100.0
Democratic hold			

=== District 5 ===
The 5th district includes parts of the Chicago neighborhoods of Armour Square, Avalon Park, Douglas, Englewood, Fuller Park, Grand Boulevard, Greater Grand Crossing, Loop, Near North Side, Near South Side, South Shore, Washington Park, and Woodlawn. The district had been represented by Democrat Juliana Stratton since January 11, 2017. Stratton later became Governor J. B. Pritzker's running mate for lieutenant governor, leaving her seat open. The Democratic primary for the 5th district seat featured four candidates.

- Felicia Bullock, first-time candidate and procurement buyer
- Ken Dunkin, former representative of the 5th district, losing his primary race in 2016 to former representative Juliana Stratton
- Lamont Robinson, small business owner, director of the Kappa Leadership Institute based out of Kenwood High School, and member of the 51st Street Business Association
- Dilara Sayeed, first-time candidate and volunteer for several campaigns and candidates over 15 years, educator, and tech entrepreneur

After winning the primary election, Lamont Robinson faced no Republican challenger in the general election. Through his election and swearing-in, hemade history by becoming the first openly LGBTQ person of color to serve in the Illinois General Assembly.

Democratic primary
Party	Candidate	Votes	%
Democratic	Lamont Robinson	7,230	40.83
Democratic	Dilara Sayeed	4,844	27.36
Democratic	Ken Dunkin	3,246	18.33
Democratic	Felicia Bullock	2,387	13.48
Total votes		17,707	100.0

General election
Party	Candidate	Votes	%
Democratic	Lamont Robinson	35,388	100.0
Total votes		35,388	100.0
Democratic hold			

=== District 6 ===
The 6th district includes parts of the Chicago neighborhoods of Armour Square, Bridgeport, Chicago Lawn, Douglas, Englewood, Fuller Park, Grand Boulevard, Greater Grand Crossing, Loop, Near North Side, Near South Side, Near West Side, New City, and West Englewood. The district had been represented by Democrat Sonya Harper since her appointment in October 2015. Harper faced neither a Democratic challenger in her primary nor a Republican challenger in the general election.

Democratic primary
Party	Candidate	Votes	%
Democratic	Sonya Harper (incumbent)	11,564	100.0
Total votes		11,564	100.0

General election
Party	Candidate	Votes	%
Democratic	Sonya Harper (incumbent)	26,000	100.0
Total votes		26,000	100.0
Democratic hold			

=== District 7 ===
The 7th district, located in the Chicago area, includes all or parts of Bellwood, Berkeley, Broadview, Forest Park, Hillside, La Grange Park, Maywood, Melrose Park, Northlake, Oak Brook, River Forest, Westchester, and Western Springs. The district had been represented by Democrat Emanuel "Chris" Welch since January 9, 2013. Welch faced neither any Democratic challenger in his primary nor any Republican challenger in the general election.

Democratic primary
Party	Candidate	Votes	%
Democratic	Emanuel "Chris" Welch (incumbent)	16,269	100.0
Total votes		16,269	100.0

General election
Party	Candidate	Votes	%
Democratic	Emanuel "Chris" Welch (incumbent)	35,678	100.0
Total votes		35,678	100.0
Democratic hold			

=== District 8 ===
The 8th district, located in the Chicago area, includes all or parts of Berwyn, Brookfield, Forest Park, La Grange, La Grange Park, North Riverside, and Oak Park and parts of the Chicago neighborhood of Austin. The district had been represented by Democrat La Shawn Ford since January 10, 2007. Ford faced neither a Democratic challenger in his primary nor any Republican challenger in the general election.

Democratic primary
Party	Candidate	Votes	%
Democratic	La Shawn Ford (incumbent)	15,419	100.0
Total votes		15,419	100.0

General election
Party	Candidate	Votes	%
Democratic	La Shawn Ford (incumbent)	31,923	100.0
Total votes		31,923	100.0
Democratic hold			

=== District 9 ===
The 9th district includes parts of the Chicago neighborhoods of East Garfield Park, Lincoln Park, Loop, Lower West Side, Near North Side, Near West Side, North Lawndale, South Lawndale, West Garfield Park, and West Town. The district had been represented by Democrat Art Turner since December 2010. He was the Deputy Majority Leader of the Illinois House of Representatives during the 100th General Assembly. Turner faced neither any Democratic challenger in his primary nor any Republican challenger in the general election.

Democratic primary
Party	Candidate	Votes	%
Democratic	Art Turner (incumbent)	11,767	100.0
Total votes		11,767	100.0

General election
Party	Candidate	Votes	%
Democratic	Art Turner (incumbent)	30,951	100.0
Total votes		30,951	100.0
Democratic hold			

=== District 10 ===
The 10th district includes parts of the Chicago neighborhoods of Austin, East Garfield Park, Humboldt Park, Lincoln Park, Logan Square, Near North Side, Near West Side, West Garfield Park, and West Town. The district had been represented by Democrat Melissa Conyears-Ervin since January 11, 2017. Conyears-Ervin faced neither any Democratic challenger in her primary nor any Republican challenger in the general election.

Democratic primary
Party	Candidate	Votes	%
Democratic	Melissa Conyears-Ervin (incumbent)	12,396	100.0
Total votes		12,396	100.0

General election
Party	Candidate	Votes	%
Democratic	Melissa Conyears-Ervin (incumbent)	31,649	100.0
Total votes		31,649	100.0
Democratic hold			

=== District 11 ===
The 11th district includes parts of the Chicago neighborhoods of Albany Park, Avondale, Irving Park, Lake View, Lincoln Park, Lincoln Square, Logan Square, and North Center. The district had been represented by Democrat Ann Williams since January 12, 2011. Williams faced neither any Democratic challenger in her primary nor any Republican challenger in the general election.

Democratic primary
Party	Candidate	Votes	%
Democratic	Ann Williams (incumbent)	17,007	100.0
Total votes		17,007	100.0

General election
Party	Candidate	Votes	%
Democratic	Ann Williams (incumbent)	42,291	100.0
Total votes		42,291	100.0
Democratic hold			

=== District 12 ===
The 12th district includes parts of the Chicago neighborhoods of Lake View, Lincoln Park, Near North Side, and Uptown. The district had been represented by Democrat Sara Feigenholtz since January 11, 1995. Feigenholtz faced neither any Democratic challenger in her primary nor any Republican challenger in the general election.

Democratic primary
Party	Candidate	Votes	%
Democratic	Sara Feigenholtz (incumbent)	18,262	100.0
Total votes		18,262	100.0

General election
Party	Candidate	Votes	%
Democratic	Sara Feigenholtz (incumbent)	46,346	100.0
Total votes		46,346	100.0
Democratic hold			

=== District 13 ===
The 13th district includes parts of the Chicago neighborhoods of Albany Park, Edgewater, Lake View, North Center, North Park, Rogers Park, Uptown, and West Ridge. The district had been represented by Democrat Greg Harris since December 2006. He was an Assistant Majority Leader of the Illinois House of Representatives during the 100th General Assembly. Harris faced neither any Democratic challenger in his primary nor any Republican challenger in the general election.

Democratic primary
Party	Candidate	Votes	%
Democratic	Greg Harris (incumbent)	18,045	100.0
Total votes		18,045	100.0

General election
Party	Candidate	Votes	%
Democratic	Greg Harris (incumbent)	39,456	100.0
Total votes		39,456	100.0
Democratic hold			

=== District 14 ===
The 14th district, located in the Chicago area, includes parts of Evanston and includes parts of the Chicago neighborhoods of Edgewater, Rogers Park, Uptown, and West Ridge. The district had been represented by Democrat Kelly Cassidy since her appointment in May 2011. Cassidy faced primary challenger Arthur Noah Siegel, a former worker for Bernie Sanders' campaign and business owner in construction. After winning the primary election, Cassidy did not face any Republican challenger in the general election.

Democratic primary
Party	Candidate	Votes	%
Democratic	Kelly Cassidy (incumbent)	16,609	85.94
Democratic	Arthur Noah Siegel	2,718	14.06
Total votes		19,327	100.0

General election
Party	Candidate	Votes	%
Democratic	Kelly Cassidy (incumbent)	37,446	100.0
Total votes		37,446	100.0
Democratic hold			

=== District 15 ===
The 15th district, located in the Chicago area, includes parts of Glenview, Morton Grove, Niles, Park Ridge, and Skokie and includes parts of the Chicago neighborhoods of Albany Park, Forest Glen, Irving Park, Jefferson Park, North Park, and Norwood Park. The district had been represented by Democrat John D'Amico since November 2004. D'Amico faced Republican challenger Amanda Biela, a first-time candidate, former Chicago public school teacher, and past president of the local parenting organization Moms Club of Northwest Chicagoland.

Democratic primary
Party	Candidate	Votes	%
Democratic	John D'Amico (incumbent)	11,861	100.0
Total votes		11,861	100.0

Republican primary
Party	Candidate	Votes	%
Republican	Amanda Biela	3,096	100.0
Total votes		3,096	100.0

General election
Party	Candidate	Votes	%
Democratic	John D'Amico (incumbent)	21,908	61.50
Republican	Amanda Biela	13,714	38.50
Total votes		35,622	100.0
Democratic hold			

=== District 16 ===
The 16th district, located in the Chicago area, includes parts of Lincolnwood, Morton Grove, and Skokie and includes parts of the Chicago neighborhoods of North Park and West Ridge. The district had been represented by Democrat Lou Lang since his appointment in July 1987. Lang faced neither any Democratic challenger in his primary nor any Republican challenger in the general election. After winning his election, Lang resigned two days before his inauguration to work as a lobbyist. Yehiel Mark Kalish was appointed to fill the seat.

Democratic primary
Party	Candidate	Votes	%
Democratic	Lou Lang (incumbent)	11,698	100.0
Total votes		11,698	100.0

General election
Party	Candidate	Votes	%
Democratic	Lou Lang (incumbent)	24,605	100.0
Total votes		24,605	100.0
Democratic hold			

=== District 17 ===
The 17th district, located in the Chicago area, includes all or parts of Evanston, Glenview, Golf, Morton Grove, Northbrook, Skokie, and Wilmette. The district had been represented by Democrat Laura Fine since January 9, 2013. On July 28, 2017, Fine announced her intention to run for the senate seat being vacated by Daniel Biss, leaving her seat open. The Democratic primary for the 17th district seat featured five candidates.

- Candance Chow, Evanston/Skokie District 65 school board president
- Pete Dagher, former Deputy Political Director of the Democratic National Committee, former director of special projects at the White House, and former staffer for President Bill Clinton
- Alexandra Eidenberg, president and co-founder of the Insurance People; founder of We Will; worked on campaigns for Illinois Representative Robert Martwick, US Representative Chuy Garcia, and US Senator Bernie Sanders
- Jennifer Gong-Gershowitz, pro bono attorney for the National Immigrant Justice Center, founding member and co-chair of the Illinois Unaccompanied Children's Task Force, and board member of the Glenview Education Foundation
- Mary Rita Luecke, attorney, precinct volunteer for Niles Township Democratic Party, and former member of Evanston/Skokie District School Board

The Republican primary for the 17th district seat featured Peter Lee, attorney and president of the Korean Association of Chicago.

Democratic primary
Party	Candidate	Votes	%
Democratic	Jennifer Gong-Gershowitz	7,800	36.61
Democratic	Candance Chow	7,165	33.63
Democratic	Mary Rita Luecke	3,526	16.55
Democratic	Alexandra Eidenberg	1,812	8.51
Democratic	Pete Dagher	1,002	4.70
Total votes		21,305	100.0

Republican primary
Party	Candidate	Votes	%
Republican	Peter Lee	4,631	100.0
Total votes		4,631	100.0

General election
Party	Candidate	Votes	%
Democratic	Jennifer Gong-Gershowitz	34,328	69.20
Republican	Peter Lee	15,281	30.80
Total votes		49,609	100.0
Democratic hold			

=== District 18 ===
The 18th district, located in the Chicago area, includes all or parts of Deerfield, Evanston, Glencoe, Glenview, Kenilworth, Northbrook, Northfield, Wilmette, and Winnetka. The district had been represented by Democrat Robyn Gabel since her appointment in April 2010. The Republican challenger in this election was Julie Cho, an operations consultant.

Democratic primary
Party	Candidate	Votes	%
Democratic	Robyn Gabel (incumbent)	19,926	100.0
Total votes		19,926	100.0

Republican primary
Party	Candidate	Votes	%
Republican	Julie Cho	3,944	100.0
Total votes		3,944	100.0

General election
Party	Candidate	Votes	%
Democratic	Robyn Gabel (incumbent)	37,966	72.09
Republican	Julie Cho	14,697	27.91
Total votes		52,663	100.0
Democratic hold			

=== District 19 ===
The 19th district, located in the Chicago area, includes parts of Elmwood Park, Harwood Heights, Norridge, and River Grove and includes parts of the Chicago neighborhoods of Dunning, Forest Glen, Jefferson Park, Norwood Park, O'Hare, and Portage Park. The district had been represented by Democrat Robert Martwick since January 9, 2013. Martwick faced primary challenger Jeffrey La Porte, police officer, former director for the Gladstone Park Chamber of Commerce, and former parent representative for Onahan Elementary LSC. The Republican challenger in this election was Ammie Kessem, sergeant of police and active parishioner of the St. Monica Catholic Church.

Democratic primary
Party	Candidate	Votes	%
Democratic	Robert Martwick (incumbent)	9,332	67.16
Democratic	Jeffrey La Porte	4,563	32.84
Total votes		13,895	100.0

Republican primary
Party	Candidate	Votes	%
Republican	Ammie Kessem	2,637	100.0
Total votes		2,637	100.0

General election
Party	Candidate	Votes	%
Democratic	Robert Martwick (incumbent)	21,389	60.69
Republican	Ammie Kessem	13,852	39.31
Total votes		35,241	100.0
Democratic hold			

=== District 20 ===
The 20th district, located in the Chicago area, includes parts of Des Plaines, Franklin Park, Harwood Heights, Niles, Norridge, Park Ridge, Rosemont, and Schiller Park and includes parts of the Chicago neighborhoods of Dunning, Edison Park, Norwood Park, and O'Hare. The district had been represented by Republican Michael McAuliffe since his appointment in July 1996. He was the Assistant Republican Leader of the Illinois House of Representatives during the 100th General Assembly. McAuliffe is the only Republican to serve parts of Chicago in the Illinois House. According to Illinois Election Data, the 20th district was the most Democratic district represented by a Republican during the election. The Democratic challenger in this election was Merry Marwig, former Democratic candidate for this district in 2016 and owner of a data security company. After winning her primary, Marwig announced she would step down from the race, saying, "changing circumstances in my family have forced me to reconsider my run." After Marwig stepped down from the race, McAuliffe faced no other Democratic challenger in the general election.

Democratic primary
Party	Candidate	Votes	%
Democratic	Merry Marwig	10,411	100.0
Total votes		10,411	100.0

Republican primary
Party	Candidate	Votes	%
Republican	Michael McAuliffe (incumbent)	5,382	100.0
Total votes		5,382	100.0

General election
Party	Candidate	Votes	%
Republican	Michael McAuliffe (incumbent)	27,053	100.0
Total votes		27,053	100.0
Republican hold			

=== District 21 ===
The 21st district, located in the Chicago area, includes parts of Bedford Park, Bridgeview, Cicero, Forest View, Lyons, McCook, Riverside, Stickney, and Summit and includes parts of the Chicago neighborhoods of Brighton Park, Garfield Ridge, Lower West Side, McKinley Park, and South Lawndale. The district had been represented by Democrat Silvana Tabares since January 9, 2013. After winning her primary, Tabares was appointed as the 23rd Ward alderman of Chicago on June 15, 2018, after Mike Zalewski retired from the position on May 31, 2018. Celina Villanueva, youth engagement manager for the Illinois Coalition for Immigrant and Refugee Rights (ICIRR) and former director of Organizing for Chicago Votes, was appointed July 24, 2018 to the state representative seat. Villanueva faced no Republican challenger in the general election.

Democratic primary
Party	Candidate	Votes	%
Democratic	Silvana Tabares (incumbent)	7,519	100.0
Total votes		7,519	100.0

General election
Party	Candidate	Votes	%
Democratic	Celina Villanueva (incumbent)	15,344	100.0
Total votes		15,344	100.0
Democratic hold			

=== District 22 ===
The 22nd district, located in the Chicago area, includes parts of Bedford Park and Burbank and includes all or parts of the Chicago neighborhoods of Archer Heights, Ashburn, Brighton Park, Chicago Lawn, Clearing, Gage Park, Garfield Ridge, West Elsdon, and West Lawn. The district had been represented by Mike Madigan since January 13, 1971. He was the 67th Speaker of the House from 1983 to 1995, and had been the 69th Speaker of the House since 1997. He had been chairman of the Democratic Party of Illinois since 1998. Madigan faced neither any Democratic challengers in his primary nor any Republican challenger in the general election.

Democratic primary
Party	Candidate	Votes	%
Democratic	Mike Madigan (incumbent)	12,597	100.0
Total votes		12,597	100.0

General election
Party	Candidate	Votes	%
Democratic	Mike Madigan (incumbent)	21,619	100.0
Total votes		21,619	100.0
Democratic hold			

=== District 23 ===
The 23rd district, located in the Chicago area, includes parts of Bedford Park, Berwyn, Bridgeview, Brookfield, Burbank, Cicero, Countryside, Hickory Hills, Hodgkins, Justice, La Grange, La Grange Park, McCook, Riverside, and Summit. The district had been represented by Democrat Michael Zalewski since December 2008. Zalewski faced neither any Democratic challengers in his primary nor any Republican challenger in the general election.

Democratic primary
Party	Candidate	Votes	%
Democratic	Michael Zalewski (incumbent)	8,431	100.0
Total votes		8,431	100.0

General election
Party	Candidate	Votes	%
Democratic	Michael Zalewski (incumbent)	19,161	100.0
Total votes		19,161	100.0
Democratic hold			

=== District 24 ===
The 24th district, located in the Chicago area, includes parts of Berwyn, Brookfield, Cicero, Riverside, and Stickney and includes parts of the Chicago neighborhood of South Lawndale. The district had been represented by Democrat Elizabeth "Lisa" Hernandez since January 10, 2007. Hernandez faced primary challenger Robert Rafael Reyes, vice president of Realty of Chicago, worker for Antonio Villaraigosa’s mayoral campaign in Los Angeles, and alumnus of the Congressional Hispanic Caucus Institute D.C. After winning her primary, Hernandez faced no Republican challenger in the general election.

Democratic primary
Party	Candidate	Votes	%
Democratic	Elizabeth "Lisa" Hernandez (incumbent)	6,308	57.67
Democratic	Robert Rafael Reyes	4,630	42.33
Total votes		10,938	100.0

General election
Party	Candidate	Votes	%
Democratic	Elizabeth "Lisa" Hernandez (incumbent)	19,329	100.0
Total votes		19,329	100.0
Democratic hold			

=== District 25 ===
The 25th district includes parts of the Chicago neighborhoods of Calumet Heights, East Side, Hegewisch, Hyde Park, Kenwood, South Chicago, South Deering, South Shore, and Woodlawn. The district had been represented by Democrat Barbara Flynn Currie since January 13, 1993. She had served the Illinois House since January 1979. She had been Majority Leader of the Illinois House since 1997. Currie announced she was retiring from the House and did not run for re-election. As a result of the seat of a major political player in the Illinois House now being open, the Democratic primary for the seat was very crowded. The primary featured seven candidates:

- William Calloway, community leader, activist, and one of Laquan McDonald's video revealers
- Angelique Collins, small business owner and lobbyist
- Adrienne Irmer, former legislative coordinator to the Cook County Bureau of Asset Management, a 2018 Emerging Leader with the Chicago Council on Global Affairs, and involved with social causes for over 16 years
- Grace Chan McKibben, development director at Indo-American Center, former chief of staff at Illinois Department of Employment Security, and former deputy director at Chinese American Service League
- Anne Marie Miles, attorney and aldermanic candidate for 5th Ward of Chicago in 2011 and 2015
- Flynn Rush, community outreach specialist for the Cook County Assessors Office; employment specialist for the Rebirth of Englewood Community Development Corporation; and precinct captain and area coordinator for various campaigns including those of Barack Obama, Bill Clinton and Harold Washington
- Curtis Tarver II, trial attorney, board of trustees member of Depaul USA, and member of the Chairman's Advisory Council for Big Shoulders Fund

After winning his primary, Tarver did not face a Republican challenger in the general election.

Democratic primary
Party	Candidate	Votes	%
Democratic	Curtis Tarver II	4,737	25.21
Democratic	Flynn Rush	3,071	16.34
Democratic	Grace Chan McKibben	2,838	15.10
Democratic	Adrienne Irmer	2,811	14.96
Democratic	Angelique Collins	2,260	12.03
Democratic	Anne Marie Miles	1,731	9.21
Democratic	William Calloway	1,343	7.15
Total votes		18,791	100.0

General election
Party	Candidate	Votes	%
Democratic	Curtis Tarver II	32,796	99.93
Write-in		23	0.07
Total votes		32,819	100.0
Democratic hold			

== Districts 26–50 ==
=== District 26 ===
The 26th district includes parts of the Chicago neighborhoods of Calumet Heights, Douglas, Grand Boulevard, Hyde Park, Kenwood, Loop, Near North Side, Near South Side, South Chicago, South Shore, Washington Park, and Woodlawn. The district had been represented by Democrat Christian Mitchell since January 9, 2013. Mitchell faced neither any Democratic challengers in his primary nor any Republican challenger in the general election. After winning his election and the election of Governor J. B. Pritzker, Mitchell would join the Pritzker administration as a deputy governor. Kam Buckner was appointed to serve out the remainder of Mitchell's term.

Democratic primary
Party	Candidate	Votes	%
Democratic	Christian Mitchell (incumbent)	15,926	100.0
Total votes		15,926	100.0

General election
Party	Candidate	Votes	%
Democratic	Christian Mitchell (incumbent)	35,992	100.0
Total votes		35,992	100.0
Democratic hold			

=== District 27 ===
The 27th district, located in the Chicago area, includes parts of Alsip, Blue Island, Crestwood, Midlothian, Orland Park, Palos Heights, Robbins, and Worth and parts of the Chicago neighborhoods of Auburn Gresham, Beverly, Chatham, Morgan Park, Roseland, Washington Heights, and West Pullman. The district had been represented by Democrat Justin Slaughter since his appointment in January 2017. Slaughter faced primary challenger Tawana J. (T.J.) Robinson, a special education teacher, former campaigner with LSC members of the Riverdale School District 133, and former campaigner with the various school board members of District 205 Proviso Township High Schools. After winning his primary, Slaughter faced no Republican challenger in the general election.

Democratic primary
Party	Candidate	Votes	%
Democratic	Justin Slaughter (incumbent)	10,917	54.55
Democratic	Tawana J. (T.J.) Robinson	9,095	45.45
Total votes		20,012	100.0

General election
Party	Candidate	Votes	%
Democratic	Justin Slaughter (incumbent)	33,526	100.0
Total votes		33,526	100.0
Democratic hold			

=== District 28 ===
The 28th district, located in the Chicago area, includes parts of Blue Island, Calumet Park, Crestwood, Midlothian, Oak Forest, Orland Park, Riverdale, Robbins, and Tinley Park and parts of the Chicago neighborhoods of Morgan Park, Roseland, and West Pullman. The district had been represented by Democrat Robert Rita since January 8, 2003. Rita faced two challengers in the primary election: Mary Carvlin, teacher, Blue Island Library Board trustee for six years, and founder of Northeast Blue Island Resident Action Group (now a Rain Ready / CNT group) to solve flooding issues; and Kimberly Nicole Koschnitzky, a connected vehicle specialist for General Motors. As a result of the ongoing Me Too movement, Rita's past domestic battery case with a former girlfriend came back into the limelight, previously being at the center of his 2002 election to the seat, as his aforementioned former girlfriend sided with Rita's primary challenger, Carvlin. Carvlin accused fellow primary challenger Koschnitzky of being a "ghost candidate" from Speaker Mike Madigan to split the vote between Carvlin and Koschnitzky to guarantee Rita won in the primary. After winning his primary election, Rita faced no Republican challenger in the general election.

Democratic primary
Party	Candidate	Votes	%
Democratic	Robert Rita (incumbent)	11,123	69.99
Democratic	Mary Carvlin	2,752	17.32
Democratic	Kimberly Nicole Koschnitzky	2,017	12.69
Total votes		15,892	100.0

General election
Party	Candidate	Votes	%
Democratic	Robert Rita (incumbent)	28,841	100.0
Total votes		28,841	100.0
Democratic hold			

=== District 29 ===
The 29th district, located in the Chicago area, includes parts of Calumet Heights, Chicago Heights, Crete, Dolton, East Hazel Crest, Ford Heights, Glenwood, Harvey, Homewood, Lansing, Lynwood, Monee, Phoenix, Sauk Village, South Chicago Heights, South Holland, Steger, Thornton, and University Park and parts of the Chicago neighborhoods of Riverdale and West Pullman. The district had been represented by Democrat Thaddeus Jones since January 12, 2011. Jones faced primary challenger Corean Davis, a human resource professional. After winning his primary, Jones faced no Republican challenger in the general election.

Democratic primary
Party	Candidate	Votes	%
Democratic	Thaddeus Jones (incumbent)	11,021	64.23
Democratic	Corean Davis	6,137	35.77
Total votes		17,158	100.0

General election
Party	Candidate	Votes	%
Democratic	Thaddeus Jones (incumbent)	33,109	100.0
Total votes		33,109	100.0
Democratic hold			

=== District 30 ===
The 30th district, located in the Chicago area, includes all or parts of Blue Island, Dixmoor, Dolton, East Hazel Crest, Flossmoor, Harvey, Hazel Crest, Homewood, Markham, Midlothian, Oak Forest, Phoenix, Posen, Riverdale, and Robbins. The district had been represented by Democrat Will Davis since January 8, 2003. Davis faced neither a Democratic challenger in his primary nor a Republican challenger in the general election.

Democratic primary
Party	Candidate	Votes	%
Democratic	Will Davis (incumbent)	10,569	100.0
Total votes		10,569	100.0

General election
Party	Candidate	Votes	%
Democratic	Will Davis (incumbent)	25,787	100.0
Total votes		25,787	100.0
Democratic hold			

=== District 31 ===
The 31st district, located in the Chicago area, includes parts of Bedford Park, Bridgeview, Burr Ridge, Chicago Ridge, Countryside, Hickory Hills, Hodgkins, Hometown, Indian Head Park, Justice, Oak Lawn, Palos Hills, and Willow Springs and parts of the Chicago neighborhoods of Ashburn, Auburn Gresham, Chatham, Chicago Lawn, Englewood, Greater Grand Crossing, and West Englewood. The district had been represented by Democrat Mary E. Flowers since January 9, 1985. She was an Assistant Majority Leader of the Illinois House during the 100th General Assembly. She faced primary challenger Willie Preston, carpenter, community representative for Scott Joplin Elementary School, and former community organizer for SouthSiders Organized for Unity and Liberation (SOUL). After winning her primary, Flowers faced no Republican challenger in the general election.

Democratic primary
Party	Candidate	Votes	%
Democratic	Mary E. Flowers (incumbent)	14,077	82.78
Democratic	Willie Preston	2,929	17.22
Total votes		17,006	100.0

General election
Party	Candidate	Votes	%
Democratic	Mary E. Flowers (incumbent)	30,214	100.0
Total votes		30,214	100.0
Democratic hold			

=== District 32 ===
The 32nd district, located in the Chicago area, includes parts of Bridgeview, Burbank, Hickory Hills, Justice, and Oak Lawn and includes parts of the Chicago neighborhoods of Ashburn, Chicago Lawn, Englewood, Greater Grand Crossing, West Englewood, and Woodlawn. The district had been represented by Democrat Andre Thapedi since January 14, 2009. Thapedi faced neither any challengers in his primary nor any Republican challenger in the general election.

Democratic primary
Party	Candidate	Votes	%
Democratic	Andre Thapedi (incumbent)	10,273	100.0
Total votes		10,273	100.0

General election
Party	Candidate	Votes	%
Democratic	Andre Thapedi (incumbent)	22,901	100.0
Total votes		22,901	100.0
Democratic hold			

=== District 33 ===
The 33rd district, located in the Chicago area, includes parts of Burnham, Calumet City, Ford Heights, Lansing, Lynwood, and Sauk Village and includes all or parts of the Chicago neighborhoods of Avalon Park, Burnside, Calumet Heights, Chatham, East Side, Hegewisch, South Chicago, and South Deering. The district had been represented by Democrat Marcus C. Evans Jr. since his appointment in April 2012. Evans Jr. faced neither any challengers in his primary nor any Republican challenger in the general election.

Democratic primary
Party	Candidate	Votes	%
Democratic	Marcus C. Evans Jr. (incumbent)	16,541	100.0
Total votes		16,541	100.0

General election
Party	Candidate	Votes	%
Democratic	Marcus C. Evans Jr. (incumbent)	32,916	100.0
Total votes		32,916	100.0
Democratic hold			

=== District 34 ===
The 34th district, located in the Chicago area, includes all or parts of Beecher, Bourbonnais, Burnham, Calumet City, Crete, Ford Heights, Grant Park, Lansing, Lynwood, Manteno, Momence, Peotone, Sauk Village, South Holland, and Willowbrook and includes all or parts of the Chicago neighborhoods of Chatham, Greater Grand Crossing, Hegewisch, Pullman, Riverdale, Roseland, South Deering, and West Pullman. The district had been represented by Democrat Elgie Sims since his appointment in August 2012. After State Senator Donne Trotter announced his retirement, Sims was appointed to his seat and sworn in on January 26, 2018. Nicholas Smith, former Chicago 9th Ward Streets & Sanitation Superintendent, legislative aide to the Committee on Transportation and Public Way, and community liaison/coordinator for Chicago State University, was appointed to the seat in February 2018. Smith did not face any Republican challenger in the general election.

Democratic primary
Party	Candidate	Votes	%
Democratic	Nicholas Smith (incumbent)	14,926	100.0
Total votes		14,926	100.0

General election
Party	Candidate	Votes	%
Democratic	Nicholas Smith (incumbent)	31,939	100.0
Total votes		31,939	100.0
Democratic hold			

=== District 35 ===
The 35th district, located in the Chicago area, includes all or parts of Alsip, Chicago Ridge, Merrionette Park, Oak Lawn, Orland Hills, Orland Park, Palos Heights, Palos Park, Tinley Park, and Worth and includes parts of the Chicago neighborhoods of Auburn Gresham, Beverly, Morgan Park, Mount Greenwood, and Washington Heights. The district had been represented by Democrat Frances Ann Hurley since January 9, 2013. Herb Hebein, former Chicago police officer, was the Republican challenger in this election.

Democratic primary
Party	Candidate	Votes	%
Democratic	Frances Ann Hurley (incumbent)	17,377	100.0
Total votes		17,377	100.0

Republican primary
Party	Candidate	Votes	%
Republican	Herb Hebein	4,413	100.0
Total votes		4,413	100.0

General election
Party	Candidate	Votes	%
Democratic	Frances Ann Hurley (incumbent)	30,511	68.82
Republican	Herb Hebein	13,821	31.18
Total votes		44,332	100.0
Democratic hold			

=== District 36 ===
The 36th district, located in the Chicago area, includes parts of Chicago Ridge, Evergreen Park, Oak Lawn, Palos Heights, Palos Park, Willow Springs, and Worth and includes parts of the Chicago neighborhoods of Ashburn, Auburn Gresham, Beverly, and Mount Greenwood. The district had been represented by Democrat Kelly M. Burke since January 12, 2011. Burke faced neither any challengers in her primary nor any Republican challenger in the general election.

Democratic primary
Party	Candidate	Votes	%
Democratic	Kelly M. Burke (incumbent)	14,361	100.0
Total votes		14,361	100.0

General election
Party	Candidate	Votes	%
Democratic	Kelly M. Burke (incumbent)	30,339	100.0
Total votes		30,339	100.0
Democratic hold			

=== District 37 ===
The 37th district, located in the Chicago area, includes parts of Frankfort, Frankfort Square, Homer Glen, Joliet, Lockport, Mokena, New Lenox, Orland Park, and Tinley Park. The district had been represented by Republican Margo McDermed since January 14, 2015. McDermed's Democratic challenger in the general election was Matthew Hunt, property and casualty insurance agent for his family's agency, Hunt Insurance Group, board member of the Illinois State Fire Marshall Elevator Safety Division, and trustee of the Palos Heights Police Pension Board.

Democratic primary
Party	Candidate	Votes	%
Democratic	Matthew Hunt	8,355	100.0
Total votes		8,355	100.0

Republican primary
Party	Candidate	Votes	%
Republican	Margo McDermed (incumbent)	8,046	100.0
Total votes		8,046	100.0

General election
Party	Candidate	Votes	%
Republican	Margo McDermed (incumbent)	27,148	57.98
Democratic	Matthew Hunt	19,675	42.02
Total votes		46,823	100.0
Republican hold			

=== District 38 ===
The 38th district, located in the Chicago area, includes parts of Country Club Hills, Flossmoor, Frankfort, Frankfort Square, Harvey, Hazel Crest, Homewood, Markham, Matteson, Oak Forest, Olympia Fields, Park Forest, Richton Park, Tinley Park, and University Park. The district had been represented by Democrat Al Riley since January 10, 2007. On September 26, 2017, Riley announced he would not seek reelection to a seventh term. The Democratic primary for the 38th district featured four candidates:

- David Bonner, former legal officer and administrative law attorney in the Department of the Army's Office of the Inspector General at the Pentagon, former Illinois Assistant Attorney General in the Civil Trials and Prosecutions unit, formerly worked on Barack Obama's Senate campaign
- Cecil Matthews Jr., finance supervisor for Winston & Strawn LLP, first-time candidate
- Debbie Meyers-Martin, former village president and trustee of Olympia Fields, president of the South Suburban Mayors and Managers Association, and former member of several advisory boards, economic boards, and regulatory boards
- Max Solomon, attorney, adjunct professor at South Suburban College, and former primary candidate for the 19th district in the Illinois Senate

After winning her primary, Meyers-Martin faced no Republican challenger in the general election.

Democratic primary
Party	Candidate	Votes	%
Democratic	Debbie Meyers-Martin	7,974	44.83
Democratic	David Bonner	4,685	26.34
Democratic	Max Solomon	3,177	17.86
Democratic	Cecil Matthews Jr.	1,953	10.98
Total votes		17,789	100.0

General election
Party	Candidate	Votes	%
Democratic	Debbie Meyers-Martin	35,832	100.0
Total votes		35,832	100.0
Democratic hold			

=== District 39 ===
The 39th district includes parts of the Chicago neighborhoods of Avondale, Belmont Cragin, Dunning, Hermosa, Irving Park, Logan Square, and Portage Park. The district had been represented by Democrat Will Guzzardi since January 14, 2015. Guzzardi faced neither any challengers in his primary nor any Republican challenger in the general election.

Democratic primary
Party	Candidate	Votes	%
Democratic	Will Guzzardi (incumbent)	11,086	100.0
Total votes		11,086	100.0

General election
Party	Candidate	Votes	%
Democratic	Will Guzzardi (incumbent)	26,106	100.0
Total votes		26,106	100.0
Democratic hold			

=== District 40 ===
The 40th district includes parts of the Chicago neighborhoods of Albany Park, Avondale, Irving Park, Logan Square, and Portage Park. The district had been represented by Democrat Jaime Andrade Jr. since his appointment in August 2013. Andrade Jr. faced neither any challengers in his primary nor any Republican challenger in the general election.

Democratic primary
Party	Candidate	Votes	%
Democratic	Jaime Andrade Jr. (incumbent)	12,191	100.0
Total votes		12,191	100.0

General election
Party	Candidate	Votes	%
Democratic	Jaime Andrade Jr. (incumbent)	27,755	99.98
Write-in		6	0.02
Total votes		27,761	100.0
Democratic hold			

=== District 41 ===
The 41st district, located in the Chicago area, includes parts of Bolingbrook, Naperville, and Warrenville. The district had been represented by Republican Grant Wehrli since January 14, 2015. Val Montgomery was the Democratic challenger in this election. Montgomery was later found to be incorrectly listed by the DuPage County Election Commission as living in the 41st district, whereas her address placed her in the 49th district. DuPage County Judge Bonnie Wheaton ruled that Montgomery could not be a candidate in the election, and, if elected, could only be seated if she won and the Illinois General Assembly decided to seat her. Despite this ruling, Montgomery did not withdraw from the race and remained on the ballot.

Democratic primary
Party	Candidate	Votes	%
Democratic	Val Montgomery	8,809	100.0
Total votes		8,809	100.0

Republican primary
Party	Candidate	Votes	%
Republican	Grant Wehrli (incumbent)	7,414	100.0
Total votes		7,414	100.0

General election
Party	Candidate	Votes	%
Republican	Grant Wehrli (incumbent)	24,798	52.00
Democratic	Val Montgomery	22,890	48.00
Total votes		47,688	100.0
Republican hold			

=== District 42 ===
The 42nd district, located in the Chicago area, includes all or parts of Carol Stream, Lisle, Naperville, Warrenville, West Chicago, Wheaton, and Winfield. The district had been represented by Republican Jeanne Ives since January 9, 2013. Ives announced in October 2017 her intention to run for governor and that she would not run for reelection to her seat. The Republican primary for the 42nd district seat featured three candidates.

- Ryan Edward Byrne, director of marketing for Cunningham Trading Systems, LLC
- Amy Grant, former school teacher of Pittsburgh Public Schools, DuPage County board member since her election in 2012, and a Milton Township Republican committeewoman since 2006
- Burt Minor, former member of the Wheaton Chamber of Commerce, former alderman of Warrenville, Illinois, and a retired USAF officer lieutenant colonel

Burt Minor faced controversy after the leak of a conversation he had with Republican candidate for Illinois Attorney General, Erika Harold. The conversation involved Minor asking Harold about her marriage status, asking if she was a "lesbo", frequently using of the n-word in front of her and her assistant, and asking whether Harold found it offensive.

Kathleen Carrier, family caregiver, precinct committeeman since 2003, and former chair of the Wayne Township Democratic Party, was the sole Democratic nominee for the 42nd district.

Democratic primary
Party	Candidate	Votes	%
Democratic	Kathleen V. Carrier	9,469	100.0
Total votes		9,469	100.0

Republican primary
Party	Candidate	Votes	%
Republican	Amy L. Grant	7,593	66.26
Republican	Burt Minor	2,567	22.40
Republican	Ryan Edward Byrne	1,299	11.34
Total votes		11,459	100.0

General election
Party	Candidate	Votes	%
Republican	Amy L. Grant	26,381	52.24
Democratic	Kathleen V. Carrier	24,122	47.76
Total votes		50,503	100.0
Republican hold			

=== District 43 ===
The 43rd district, located in the Chicago area, includes parts of Barrington Hills, Carpentersville, East Dundee, Elgin, Hoffman Estates, and South Elgin. The district had been represented by Democrat Anna Moeller since her appointment in March 2014. Moeller's Republican challenger in the general election was Andrew Cuming, property management company owner, member of the Citizen's Police Academy Alumni Association, and president of the Elgin Southwest Area Neighbors.

Democratic primary
Party	Candidate	Votes	%
Democratic	Anna Moeller (incumbent)	4,270	100.0
Total votes		4,270	100.0

Republican primary
Party	Candidate	Votes	%
Republican	Andrew R. Cuming	2,197	100.0
Total votes		2,197	100.0

General election
Party	Candidate	Votes	%
Democratic	Anna Moeller (incumbent)	14,631	70.61
Republican	Andrew R. Cuming	6,090	29.39
Total votes		20,721	100.0
Democratic hold			

=== District 44 ===
The 44th district, located in the Chicago area, includes all or parts of Bartlett, Elgin, Hanover Park, Hoffman Estates, Schaumburg, and Streamwood. The district had been represented by Democrat Fred Crespo since January 10, 2007. Crespo's Republican challenger in the general election was Katy Dolan Baumer, business owner, president of the Streamwood Chamber of Commerce, and clerk of the Hanover Township.

Democratic primary
Party	Candidate	Votes	%
Democratic	Fred Crespo (incumbent)	6,459	100.0
Total votes		6,459	100.0

Republican primary
Party	Candidate	Votes	%
Republican	Katy Dolan Baumer	3,174	100.0
Total votes		3,174	100.0

General election
Party	Candidate	Votes	%
Democratic	Fred Crespo (incumbent)	18,028	65.59
Republican	Katy Dolan Baumer	9,459	34.41
Total votes		27,487	100.0
Democratic hold			

=== District 45 ===
The 45th district, located in the Chicago area, includes all or parts of Addison, Bartlett, Bloomingdale, Carol Stream, Elk Grove Village, Hanover Park, Itasca, Roselle, Streamwood, Wayne, West Chicago, and Wood Dale. The district had been represented by Republican Christine Winger since January 14, 2015. Prior to the primary election, the Democratic nominee for the district was Cynthia Borbas, an IT consultant who formerly volunteered at the Carol Stream Chamber of Commerce and the Northern Illinois Food Bank. At some unknown time, Borbas withdrew from the race. Diane Pappas, an attorney specializing in corporate counsel, former president of the Friends of the Itasca Community Library, and a Democratic Precinct Committeeman of Addison Township Precinct 23, became the Democratic candidate for the general election.

Democratic primary
Party	Candidate	Votes	%
Democratic	Cynthia Borbas	6,885	100.0
Total votes		6,885	100.0

Republican primary
Party	Candidate	Votes	%
Republican	Christine Winger (incumbent)	7,630	100.0
Total votes		7,630	100.0

General election
Party	Candidate	Votes	%
Democratic	Diane Pappas	20,383	50.84
Republican	Christine Winger (incumbent)	19,711	49.16
Total votes		40,094	100.0
Democratic gain from Republican			

=== District 46 ===
The 46th district, located in the Chicago area, includes all or parts of Addison, Bloomingdale, Carol Stream, Elmhurst, Glen Ellyn, Glendale Heights, Hanover Park, Lombard, Oakbrook Terrace, Villa Park, and Wheaton. The district had been represented by Democrat Deb Conroy since January 9, 2013. The Republican primary saw two candidates seek the nomination for the general election: Gordon "Jay" Kinzler, doctor and surgeon, member of the Glen Ellyn Park District Board, and former commissioner of the Environmental Commission of the Village of Glen Ellyn; and Roger Orozco, police detective and former school board member of Community Consolidated School District 93.

Democratic primary
Party	Candidate	Votes	%
Democratic	Deb Conroy (incumbent)	6,269	100.0
Total votes		6,269	100.0

Republican primary
Party	Candidate	Votes	%
Republican	Gordon "Jay" Kinzler	3,783	79.44
Republican	Roger Orozco	979	20.56
Total votes		4,762	100.0

General election
Party	Candidate	Votes	%
Democratic	Deb Conroy (incumbent)	18,679	58.68
Republican	Gordon "Jay" Kinzler	13,155	41.32
Total votes		31,834	100.0
Democratic hold			

=== District 47 ===
The 47th district, located in the Chicago area, includes all or parts of Burr Ridge, Clarendon Hills, Darien, Downers Grove, Elmhurst, Hinsdale, Lombard, Oak Brook, Oakbrook Terrace, Villa Park, Western Springs, Westmont, and Willowbrook. The district had been represented by Republican Patti Bellock since January 13, 1999. She had been the Deputy House Minority Leader since October 2013. On August 1, 2017, Bellock announced her intention to retire at the end of her term. Deanne Mazzochi, lawyer, business owner, and former chairman of the College of DuPage Board of Trustees, was the Republican nominee for this election. The Democratic primary featured two candidates: Jim Caffrey, former customer team manager for Clorox and a Democratic Precinct committeeman who served in the Peace Corps for two years; and Anne Sommerkamp, prenatal educator, former journalist from 1980 to 1999, and former candidate for Downers Grove Township Clerk in 2017. Caffrey won the primary election and became the Democratic nominee. Patti Bellock resigned from her state representative seat to serve as Illinois Department of Healthcare and Family Services Director. Candidate Mazzochi was appointed on July 16, 2018, to fill the vacancy.

Democratic primary
Party	Candidate	Votes	%
Democratic	James M. "Jim" Caffrey	5,953	53.65
Democratic	Anne Sommerkamp	5,142	46.35
Total votes		11,095	100.0

Republican primary
Party	Candidate	Votes	%
Republican	Deanne Marie Mazzochi	8,758	100.0
Total votes		8,758	100.0

General election
Party	Candidate	Votes	%
Republican	Deanne Marie Mazzochi (incumbent)	26,515	51.53
Democratic	James M. "Jim" Caffrey	24,938	48.47
Total votes		51,453	100.0
Republican hold			

=== District 48 ===
The 48th district, located in the Chicago area, includes parts of Downers Grove, Glen Ellyn, Lisle, Lombard, Oakbrook Terrace, Villa Park, and Wheaton. The district had been represented by Republican Peter Breen since January 14, 2015. The Democratic candidate for this election was Terra Costa Howard, lawyer, former member of the Glen Ellyn School District 41 Board of Education, and adjunct professor at College of DuPage.

Democratic primary
Party	Candidate	Votes	%
Democratic	Terra Costa Howard	10,859	100.0
Total votes		10,859	100.0

Republican primary
Party	Candidate	Votes	%
Republican	Peter Breen (incumbent)	8,609	100.0
Total votes		8,609	100.0

General election
Party	Candidate	Votes	%
Democratic	Terra Costa Howard	26,820	53.50
Republican	Peter Breen (incumbent)	23,313	46.50
Total votes		50,133	100.0
Democratic gain from Republican			

=== District 49 ===
The 49th district, located in the Chicago area, includes parts of Aurora, Bartlett, Batavia, Elgin, Geneva, Naperville, North Aurora, South Elgin, St. Charles, Warrenville, Wayne, and West Chicago. The district had been represented by Republican Mike Fortner since January 10, 2007. Fortner announced on August 7, 2017, that he would not seek reelection. The Democratic nominee, and winner of the general election, was Karina Villa. Villa was a school social worker, member of the West Chicago District 33 Board of Education since 2013, and vice president of the West Chicago 33 Board of Education. The Republican candidate was Tonia Jane Khouri, business owner, DuPage County board member, and chair of the DuPage County Economic Development Committee. She won the Republican primary against Nic Zito.

Democratic primary
Party	Candidate	Votes	%
Democratic	Karina Villa	7,513	100.0
Total votes		7,513	100.0

Republican primary
Party	Candidate	Votes	%
Republican	Tonia Jane Khouri	5,250	65.55
Republican	Nic Zito	2,759	34.45
Total votes		8,009	100.0

General election
Party	Candidate	Votes	%
Democratic	Karina Villa	22,133	53.81
Republican	Tonia Jane Khouri	18,997	46.19
Total votes		41,130	100.0
Democratic gain from Republican			

=== District 50 ===
The 50th district, located in the Chicago area, includes all or parts of Aurora, Batavia, Big Rock, Campton Hills, Elburn, Geneva, Lily Lake, Montgomery, North Aurora, Oswego, Plano, Prestbury, St. Charles, Sugar Grove, and Yorkville. The district had been represented by Republican Keith R. Wheeler since January 14, 2015. The Democratic candidate for this election was James Leslie, firefighter/paramedic, former executive of the Naperville IAFF L4302, and first-time candidate.

Democratic primary
Party	Candidate	Votes	%
Democratic	James Leslie	7,118	100.0
Total votes		7,118	100.0

Republican primary
Party	Candidate	Votes	%
Republican	Keith R. Wheeler (incumbent)	8,074	100.0
Total votes		8,074	100.0

General election
Party	Candidate	Votes	%
Republican	Keith R. Wheeler (incumbent)	25,862	54.99
Democratic	James Leslie	21,170	45.01
Total votes		47,032	100.0
Republican hold			

== Districts 51–75 ==
=== District 51 ===
The 51st district, located in the Chicago area, includes all or parts of Arlington Heights, Barrington, Barrington Hills, Buffalo Grove, Deer Park, Forest Lake, Grayslake, Green Oaks, Gurnee, Hawthorn Woods, Kildeer, Lake Barrington, Lake Zurich, Libertyville, Long Grove, Mettawa, Mundelein, North Barrington, Tower Lakes, Vernon Hills, Wauconda, and Waukegan. The district had been represented by Republican Nick Sauer since December 2016. Nick Sauer was slated to be the Republican nominee for the general election. On August 1, 2018, Politico reported on Sauer allegedly using his ex-girlfriend's nude photos to catfish in seeking online relationships with men. Sauer resigned at 5 pm on the same day. Helene Walsh, wife of former US representative Joe Walsh, was appointed to Sauer's seat on August 18, 2018.

Mary Edly-Allen, bilingual teacher, co-founder of Foundation 46, and board member of the Illinois Science Olympiad, was the Democratic candidate for the general election.

Republican primary
Party	Candidate	Votes	%
Republican	Nick Sauer (incumbent)	9,003	100.0
Total votes		9,003	100.0

General election
Party	Candidate	Votes	%
Democratic	Mary Edly-Allen	25,950	50.36
Republican	Helene Walsh (incumbent)	25,576	49.64
Total votes		51,526	100.0
Democratic gain from Republican			

=== District 52 ===
The 52nd district, located in the Chicago area, includes all or parts of Algonquin, Barrington, Barrington Hills, Carpentersville, Cary, Crystal Lake, East Dundee, Fox River Grove, Hoffman Estates, Inverness, Island Lake, Lake Barrington, Lake in the Hills, North Barrington, Oakwood Hills, Port Barrington, Prairie Grove, South Barrington, Tower Lakes, Trout Valley, and Wauconda. The district had been represented by Republican David McSweeney since January 9, 2013. McSweeney faced neither any challengers in his primary nor any Democratic challengers in the general election.

Republican primary
Party	Candidate	Votes	%
Republican	David McSweeney (incumbent)	7,383	100.0
Total votes		7,383	100.0

General election
Party	Candidate	Votes	%
Republican	David McSweeney (incumbent)	30,399	100.0
Total votes		30,399	100.0
Republican hold			

=== District 53 ===
The 53rd district, located in the Chicago area, includes parts of Arlington Heights, Buffalo Grove, Des Plaines, Elk Grove Village, Mount Prospect, Prospect Heights, and Wheeling. The district had been represented by Republican David Harris since January 12, 2011, previously serving the Illinois State House from January 12, 1983, to January 13, 1993. Harris announced on October 4, 2017, that he would retire from the Illinois House, citing his frustrations with the Illinois Budget Impasse, as he was one of the few Republicans who voted to overturn Governor Bruce Rauner's veto. The Republican primary featured two candidates: Eddie Corrigan, outreach coordinator and cancer research and awareness advocate; and Katie Miller, registered nurse, religious education teacher, and former basketball coach. Corrigan became the Republican nominee. The Democratic nominee was Mark Walker, experienced in business and entrepreneurship for 35 years, treasurer of the Journeys organization, and member of the Arlington Heights Park Foundation Board. He previously served as state representative from 2009 to 2011 in the 66th district.

Democratic primary
Party	Candidate	Votes	%
Democratic	Mark L. Walker	11,975	100.0
Total votes		11,975	100.0

Republican primary
Party	Candidate	Votes	%
Republican	Eddie Corrigan	5,832	61.53
Republican	Katie Miller	3,647	38.47
Total votes		9,479	100.0

General election
Party	Candidate	Votes	%
Democratic	Mark L. Walker	23,792	52.44
Republican	Eddie Corrigan	21,580	47.56
Total votes		45,372	100.0
Democratic gain from Republican			

=== District 54 ===
The 54th district, located in the Chicago area, includes parts of Arlington Heights, Barrington, Deer Park, Hoffman Estates, Inverness, Palatine, Rolling Meadows, Schaumburg, and South Barrington. The district had been represented by Republican Tom Morrison since January 12, 2011. The Democratic candidate for this election was Maggie Trevor, principal, owner of Trevor Research Services, LLC, and member of the City of Rolling Meadows Environmental Committee since 2015.

Democratic primary
Party	Candidate	Votes	%
Democratic	Maggie Trevor	9,763	100.0
Total votes		9,763	100.0

Republican primary
Party	Candidate	Votes	%
Republican	Tom Morrison (incumbent)	7,451	100.0
Total votes		7,451	100.0

General election
Party	Candidate	Votes	%
Republican	Tom Morrison (incumbent)	22,490	50.05
Democratic	Maggie Trevor	22,447	49.95
Total votes		44,937	100.0
Republican hold			

=== District 55 ===
The 55th district, located in the Chicago area, includes parts of Arlington Heights, Des Plaines, Elk Grove Village, Mount Prospect, Park Ridge, Rolling Meadows, and Schaumburg as well as parts of the Chicago neighborhood of O'Hare. The district had been represented by Democrat Marty Moylan since January 9, 2013. The Republican challenger for this election was Marilyn Smolenski, a business owner and volunteer for USO and Special Olympics, who was involved with the Boy Scouts of America for many years.

Democratic primary
Party	Candidate	Votes	%
Democratic	Marty Moylan (incumbent)	9,433	100.0
Total votes		9,433	100.0

Republican primary
Party	Candidate	Votes	%
Republican	Marilyn Smolenski	4,690	100.0
Total votes		4,690	100.0

General election
Party	Candidate	Votes	%
Democratic	Marty Moylan (incumbent)	20,449	55.63
Republican	Marilyn Smolenski	16,308	44.37
Total votes		36,757	100.0
Democratic hold			

=== District 56 ===
The 56th district, located in the Chicago area, includes parts of Elk Grove Village, Hanover Park, Hoffman Estates, Palatine, Rolling Meadows, Roselle, and Schaumburg. The district had been represented by Democrat Michelle Mussman since January 12, 2011. The Republican primary for this election featured two candidates: Jillian Rose Bernas, international relations manager, a Schaumburg Township District Library trustee, and Township of Schaumburg Mental Health Committee member; and Char Kegarise, branch officer manager and member of the Schaumburg District 54 School Board. Bernas became the Republican nominee for the general election.

Democratic primary
Party	Candidate	Votes	%
Democratic	Michelle Mussman (incumbent)	8,361	100.0
Total votes		8,361	100.0

Republican primary
Party	Candidate	Votes	%
Republican	Jillian Rose Bernas	3,457	60.00
Republican	Charlotte "Char" Kegarise	2,305	40.00
Total votes		5,762	100.0

General election
Party	Candidate	Votes	%
Democratic	Michelle Mussman (incumbent)	21,352	58.86
Republican	Jillian Rose Bernas	14,923	41.14
Total votes		36,275	100.0
Democratic hold			

=== District 57 ===
The 57th district, located in the Chicago area, includes parts of Arlington Heights, Buffalo Grove, Des Plaines, Glenview, Mount Prospect, Northbrook, Palatine, Prospect Heights, and Wheeling. The district had been represented by Democrat Elaine Nekritz since January 8, 2003. Nekritz announced that she was planning to resign in June 2017. Her official resignation became effective on October 2, 2017. Jonathan Carroll was appointed to Nekritz's seat on October 4, 2017. Mary Battinus was the Republican challenger in this election. On May 29, 2018, Battinus withdrew from the race as a result of moving out of the state.

Democratic primary
Party	Candidate	Votes	%
Democratic	Jonathan Carroll (incumbent)	8,286	100.0
Total votes		8,286	100.0

Republican primary
Party	Candidate	Votes	%
Republican	Mary Battinus	3,726	100.0
Total votes		3,726	100.0

General election
Party	Candidate	Votes	%
Democratic	Jonathan Carroll (incumbent)	24,446	100.0
Total votes		24,446	100.0
Democratic hold			

=== District 58 ===
The 58th district, located in the Chicago area, includes all or parts of Bannockburn, Deerfield, Glencoe, Highland Park, Highwood, Knollwood, Lake Bluff, Lake Forest, Lincolnshire, Mettawa, North Chicago, Northbrook, and Riverwoods. The district had been represented by Democrat Scott Drury since January 9, 2013. Drury attempted to run for governor of Illinois, but opted to run for Illinois Attorney General after the retirement of Lisa Madigan left the 58th district seat open. The Democratic nominee for this election was Bob Morgan, former lead healthcare attorney for Illinois, board member of the Anti-Defamation League, and a trustee for Equip for Equality. Cindy Masover was slated to be the Republican nominee for the general election until she decided to leave the race for personal reasons. Rick Lesser, small business owner and estate planning attorney, former member of the Lake Bluff Village Board of Trustees, and former president of the Lake County Bar Association, became the Republican nominee on July 26, 2018, for the general election.

Democratic primary
Party	Candidate	Votes	%
Democratic	Bob Morgan	12,194	100.0
Total votes		12,194	100.0

Republican primary
Party	Candidate	Votes	%
Republican	Cindy Masover	4,650	100.0
Total votes		4,650	100.0

General election
Party	Candidate	Votes	%
Democratic	Bob Morgan	29,974	63.81
Republican	Fredric Bryan "Rick" Lesser	16,998	36.19
Total votes		46,972	100.0
Democratic hold			

=== District 59 ===
The 59th district, located in the Chicago area, includes parts of Buffalo Grove, Green Oaks, Gurnee, Indian Creek, Knollwood, Lake Forest, Lincolnshire, Long Grove, Mettawa, Mundelein, North Chicago, Northbrook, Park City, Riverwoods, Vernon Hills, Waukegan, and Wheeling. The district had been represented by Democrat Carol Sente since her appointment in September 2009. Sente announced on September 12, 2017, that she would not seek reelection. The Democratic primary featured two candidates: Daniel Didech, municipal attorney and supervisor of the Vernon Township; and Susan Malter, attorney, founding member of the Chicago Legal Responders Network, and an active member of the Lawyers for Good Government (L4GG). Didech became the Democratic nominee for the general election. The Republican primary featured two candidates: Karen Feldman, residential realtor and village trustee of Lincolnshire from 2001 to 2018; and Marko Sukovic, business owner, former political director for Congressman Robert Dold, and outreach director for Turning Point USA. Feldman became the Republican nominee for the general election.

Democratic primary
Party	Candidate	Votes	%
Democratic	Daniel Didech	5,942	60.43
Democratic	Susan Malter	3,891	39.57
Total votes		9,833	100.0

Republican primary
Party	Candidate	Votes	%
Republican	Karen Feldman	2,485	58.89
Republican	Marko Sukovic	1,735	41.11
Total votes		4,220	100.0

General election
Party	Candidate	Votes	%
Democratic	Daniel Didech	22,038	61.34
Republican	Karen Feldman	13,891	38.66
Total votes		35,929	100.0
Democratic hold			

=== District 60 ===
The 60th district, located in the Chicago area, includes parts of Beach Park, Gurnee, North Chicago, Park City, and Waukegan. The district had been represented by Democrat Rita Mayfield since her appointment in July 2010. Mayfield faced neither any challengers in her primary nor any Republican challenger in the general election.

Democratic primary
Party	Candidate	Votes	%
Democratic	Rita Mayfield (incumbent)	5,327	100.0
Total votes		5,327	100.0

General election
Party	Candidate	Votes	%
Democratic	Rita Mayfield (incumbent)	18,694	100.0
Total votes		18,694	100.0
Democratic hold			

=== District 61 ===
The 61st district, located in the Chicago area, includes parts of Antioch, Beach Park, Gages Lake, Grandwood Park, Gurnee, Lake Villa, Lindenhurst, Old Mill Creek, Third Lake, Wadsworth, Waukegan, Winthrop Harbor, and Zion. The district had been represented by Republican Sheri Jesiel since her appointment on July 2, 2014. The Democratic nominee in this election was Joyce Mason, human resources consultant, vice president of the board of education for the Woodland Consolidated Community School District 50, and a member of the board of directors for A Safe Place, a domestic violence organization.

Democratic primary
Party	Candidate	Votes	%
Democratic	Joyce Mason	6,233	100.0
Total votes		6,233	100.0

Republican primary
Party	Candidate	Votes	%
Republican	Sheri Jesiel (incumbent)	5,392	100.0
Total votes		5,392	100.0

General election
Party	Candidate	Votes	%
Democratic	Joyce Mason	20,015	51.58
Republican	Sheri Jesiel (incumbent)	18,789	48.42
Total votes		38,804	100.0
Democratic gain from Republican			

=== District 62 ===
The 62nd district, located in the Chicago area, includes all or parts of Gages Lake, Grayslake, Gurnee, Hainesville, Lake Villa, Long Lake, Round Lake, Round Lake Beach, Round Lake Heights, Round Lake Park, Third Lake, Venetian Village, Volo, Wauconda, and Waukegan. The district had been represented by Democrat Sam Yingling since January 9, 2013. The Republican primary featured two candidates: Ken Idstein, mortgage banker, member of the Grayslake Chamber of Commerce, and member of the Grayslake Planning and Zoning Commission; and Adam Solano, financial advisor, former president of National Association of Insurance and Financial Advisors (NAIFA) in Illinois, and former president of NAIFA Chicago. Idstein became the Republican nominee.

Democratic primary
Party	Candidate	Votes	%
Democratic	Sam Yingling (incumbent)	6,586	100.0
Total votes		6,586	100.0

Republican primary
Party	Candidate	Votes	%
Republican	Ken Idstein	3,387	61.46
Republican	Adam Solano	2,124	38.54
Total votes		5,511	100.0

General election
Party	Candidate	Votes	%
Democratic	Sam Yingling (incumbent)	19,614	56.53
Republican	Ken Idstein	15,082	43.47
Total votes		34,696	100.0
Democratic hold			

=== District 63 ===
The 63rd district, located in the Chicago area, includes all or parts of Bull Valley, Chemung, Crystal Lake, Greenwood, Harvard, Hebron, Johnsburg, Lakemoor, Marengo, McCullom Lake, McHenry, Pistakee Highlands, Richmond, Ringwood, Spring Grove, Union, Wonder Lake, and Woodstock. The district had been represented by Republican Steve Reick since January 11, 2017. Reick faced neither any challengers in his primary nor any Democratic challenger in the general election.

Republican primary
Party	Candidate	Votes	%
Republican	Steven Reick (incumbent)	8,334	100.0
Total votes		8,334	100.0

General election
Party	Candidate	Votes	%
Republican	Steven Reick (incumbent)	26,121	100.0
Total votes		26,121	100.0
Republican hold			

=== District 64 ===
The 64th district, located in the Chicago area, includes all or parts of Antioch, Bull Valley, Channel Lake, Crystal Lake, Fox Lake, Fox Lake Hills, Holiday Hills, Island Lake, Johnsburg, Lake Catherine, Lake Villa, Lakemoor, Lakewood, Lindenhurst, Long Lake, McHenry, Prairie Grove, Round Lake Heights, Spring Grove, Venetian Village, Volo, Wauconda, Wonder Lake, and Woodstock. The district had been represented by Republican Barbara Wheeler since January 9, 2013. Wheeler announced on July 28, 2017, that she would not seek reelection in 2018. The Republican nominee in this election was Tom Weber, small business owner, member of the Lake County Board since 2012, and member of the Lake County Forest Preserve District Board. The Democratic nominee for this election was Trisha Zubert, who worked in finance, was a school board member and president, and was a volunteer with Lake County Haven.

Republican primary
Party	Candidate	Votes	%
Republican	Tom Weber	7,752	100.0
Total votes		7,752	100.0

General election
Party	Candidate	Votes	%
Republican	Tom Weber	23,929	56.72
Democratic	Trisha Zubert	18,262	43.28
Total votes		42,191	100.0
Republican hold			

=== District 65 ===
The 65th district, located in the Chicago area, includes all or parts of Batavia, Burlington, Campton Hills, Elgin, Geneva, Gilberts, Hampshire, Huntley, Pingree Grove, South Elgin, St. Charles, and Wayne. The district had been represented by Republican Steven Andersson since January 14, 2015. Andersson announced on August 16, 2017, that he would not seek reelection to the Illinois House of Representatives in 2018 during an appearance on Chicago Tonight. Andersson was one of the few Republicans during the Illinois Budget Impasse to vote to overturn Governor Bruce Rauner's veto. The Republican nominee for this election was Dan Ugaste, attorney, former member of the Illinois Workers Compensation Medical Fee Advisory Board, and the Technical Advisor to Governor's Office on Workers Comp Reform. The Democratic nominee for this election was Richard Johnson, law and psychology teacher at Bartlett High School and president of the Elgin Teachers Association.

Democratic primary
Party	Candidate	Votes	%
Democratic	Richard Johnson	8,420	100.0
Total votes		8,420	100.0

Republican primary
Party	Candidate	Votes	%
Republican	Dan Ugaste	8,563	100.0
Total votes		8,563	100.0

General election
Party	Candidate	Votes	%
Republican	Dan Ugaste	26,475	52.14
Democratic	Richard Johnson	24,306	47.86
Total votes		50,781	100.0
Republican hold			

=== District 66 ===
The 66th district, located in the Chicago area, includes all or parts of Algonquin, Carpetnersville, Crystal Lake, East Dundee, Elgin, Gilberts, Huntley, Lake in the Hills, Lakewood, Sleepy Hollow, and West Dundee. The district had been represented by Republican Allen Skillicorn since January 11, 2017. Skillicorn faced neither any challengers in his primary nor any Democratic challenger in the general election.

Republican primary
Party	Candidate	Votes	%
Republican	Allen Skillicorn (incumbent)	5,810	100.0
Total votes		5,810	100.0

General election
Party	Candidate	Votes	%
Republican	Allen Skillicorn (incumbent)	26,940	100.0
Total votes		26,940	100.0
Republican hold			

=== District 67 ===
The 67th district covers a large part of Rockford. The district had been represented by Democrat Litesa Wallace since her appointment in July 2014. Wallace became Daniel Biss' running mate for seeking the Democratic nomination in the gubernatorial election, leaving her seat open. The Democratic primary for this election featured four candidates.

- Gerald O. Albert, self-employed; former candidate for several town, township, and county positions; involved in several campaigns for elected officials in Rockford
- Valerie DeCastris, community volunteer activist, research associate for the Illinois General Assembly, and founder of the Rockford Ethnic Village Neighborhood Association
- Angela Fellars
- Maurice West, director of career development at Rockford University and member of the Community Action Agency Board in Rockford since 2013

After winning the Democratic nomination, West faced no Republican challenger in the general election.

Democratic primary
Party	Candidate	Votes	%
Democratic	Maurice A. West II	2,786	39.81
Democratic	Angela Fellars	1,913	27.33
Democratic	Valeri DeCastris	1,532	21.89
Democratic	Gerald O. Albert	768	10.97
Total votes		6,999	100.0

General election
Party	Candidate	Votes	%
Democratic	Maurice A. West II	18,623	100.0
Total votes		18,623	100.0
Democratic hold			

=== District 68 ===
The 68th district covers parts of Cherry Valley, Loves Park, Machesney Park, Rockford, and Roscoe. The district had been represented by Republican John Cabello since his appointment in August 2012. The Democratic nominee for this election was Jake Castanza, the executive director of Project First Rate.

Democratic primary
Party	Candidate	Votes	%
Democratic	Jake Castanza	7,855	100.0
Total votes		7,855	100.0

Republican primary
Party	Candidate	Votes	%
Republican	John M. Cabello (incumbent)	10,119	100.0
Total votes		10,119	100.0

General election
Party	Candidate	Votes	%
Republican	John M. Cabello (incumbent)	21,052	51.31
Democratic	Jake Castanza	19,980	48.69
Total votes		41,032	100.0
Republican hold			

=== District 69 ===
The 69th district covers all or parts of Belvidere, Caledonia, Capron, Cherry Valley, Loves Park, New Milford, Poplar Grove, Rockford, Rockton, Roscoe, South Beloit, and Timberlane. The district had been represented by Republican Joe Sosnowski since January 12, 2011. The Democratic nominee for this election was Angie Bodine, driver for First Student and Precinct Committee Person Secretary of Boone County Democrats.

Democratic primary
Party	Candidate	Votes	%
Democratic	Angelique "Angie" Bodine	5,843	100.0
Total votes		5,843	100.0

Republican primary
Party	Candidate	Votes	%
Republican	Joe Sosnowski (incumbent)	10,232	100.0
Total votes		10,232	100.0

General election
Party	Candidate	Votes	%
Republican	Joe Sosnowski (incumbent)	24,526	60.11
Democratic	Angelique "Angie" Bodine	16,277	39.89
Total votes		40,803	100.0
Republican hold			

=== District 70 ===
The 70th district, located partly in the Chicago area, includes Belvidere, Big Rock, Burlington, Campton Hills, Cortland, DeKalb, Elgin, Garden Prairie, Genoa, Hampshire, Hinckley, Kaneville, Kingston, Kirkland, Lily Lake, Malta, Maple Park, Poplar Grove, Sugar Grove, Sycamore, and Virgil. The district had been represented by Republican Bob Pritchard since his appointment in December 2003. Pritchard announced that he would retire at the end of his term. He was one of the few Republicans who voted to end the Illinois Budget Impasse. The Republican nominee for this election was Jeff Keicher, small business owner. The Democratic primary featured two candidates: Howard Solomon, retiree, member and secretary of the District 428 Board of Education, and former member of the Village of Fox Lake Planning Commission; and Paul Stoddard, retired associate professor of geology at Northern Illinois University and member of the DeKalb County board. Stoddard became the Democratic nominee for the general election. Republican candidate Keicher was later appointed to the seat in July 2018 to finish the remainder of Pritchard's term.

Democratic primary
Party	Candidate	Votes	%
Democratic	Paul Stoddard	5,225	76.30
Democratic	Howard Solomon	1,623	23.70
Total votes		6,848	100.0

Republican primary
Party	Candidate	Votes	%
Republican	Jeff Keicher	6,546	100.0
Total votes		6,546	100.0

General election
Party	Candidate	Votes	%
Republican	Jeff Keicher (incumbent)	20,307	51.72
Democratic	Paul Stoddard	18,955	48.28
Total votes		39,262	100.0
Republican hold			

=== District 71 ===
The 71st district, located partly in the Quad Cities area, covers all or parts of Albany, Carbon Cliff, Cleveland, Coal Valley, Colona, Como, Cordova, Deer Grove, East Moline, Erie, Fulton, Hampton, Hillsdale, Lyndon, Moline, Morrison, Port Byron, Prophetstown, Rapids City, Rock Falls, Savanna, Silvis, Sterling, Tampico, and Thomson. The district had been represented by Republican Tony McCombie since January 11, 2017. The Democratic nominee for this election was Joan Padilla, executive director of Home of Hope Cancer Wellness Center, former Sauk Valley Community College trustee, and a member of the Sauk Valley Community College Foundation.

Democratic primary
Party	Candidate	Votes	%
Democratic	Joan Padilla	6,067	100.0
Total votes		6,067	100.0

Republican primary
Party	Candidate	Votes	%
Republican	Tony M. McCombie (incumbent)	7,599	100.0
Total votes		7,599	100.0

General election
Party	Candidate	Votes	%
Republican	Tony M. McCombie (incumbent)	23,870	58.68
Democratic	Joan Padilla	16,805	41.32
Total votes		40,675	100.0
Republican hold			

=== District 72 ===
The 72nd district, located in the Quad Cities area, covers all or parts of Andalusia, Coyne Center, Milan, Moline, Oak Grove, Reynolds, Rock Island, and Rock Island Arsenal. The district had been represented by Democrat Michael Halpin since January 10, 2017. The Republican nominee for this election was Glen Evans Sr., former state house primary candidate for the Democratic Party in 2012 and 2016 and former candidate for multiple county and municipal positions.

Democratic primary
Party	Candidate	Votes	%
Democratic	Michael W. Halpin (incumbent)	7,457	100.0
Total votes		7,457	100.0

Republican primary
Party	Candidate	Votes	%
Republican	Glen Evans Sr.	3,380	100.0
Total votes		3,380	100.0

General election
Party	Candidate	Votes	%
Democratic	Michael W. Halpin (incumbent)	21,966	62.04
Republican	Glen Evans Sr.	13,440	37.96
Total votes		35,406	100.0
Democratic hold			

=== District 73 ===
The 73rd district, located in the Peoria metropolitan area, covers all or parts of Bay View Gardens, Bradford, Brimfield, Buda, Chillicothe, Dana, Dunlap, Elmwood, Germantown Hills, Henry, Hopewell, La Fayette, La Rose, Lacon, Leonore, Lostant, Metamora, Neponset, Peoria, Peoria Heights, Princeville, Roanoke, Rome, Rutland, Sparland, Spring Bay, Tiskilwa, Toluca, Toulon, Varna, Washburn, Wenona, Wyanet, and Wyoming. The district had been represented by Republican Ryan Spain since January 11, 2017. Spain faced neither any challengers in his primary nor any Democratic challenger in the general election.

Republican primary
Party	Candidate	Votes	%
Republican	Ryan Spain (incumbent)	10,986	100.0
Total votes		10,986	100.0

General election
Party	Candidate	Votes	%
Republican	Ryan Spain (incumbent)	38,897	100.0
Total votes		38,897	100.0
Republican hold			

=== District 74 ===
The 74th district covers all or parts of Aledo, Alexis, Alpha, Altona, Amboy, Andover, Annawan, Atkinson, Bishop Hill, Buda, Cambridge, Dover, East Galesburg, Galesburg, Galva, Geneseo, Gilson, Harmon, Henderson, Hooppole, Joy, Keithsburg, Kewanee, Knoxville, La Moille, London Mills, Manlius, Maquon, Matherville, Mineral, New Bedford, New Boston, North Henderson, Oak Run, Ohio, Oneida, Orion, Rio, Seaton, Sheffield, Sherrard, Sublette, Victoria, Viola, Walnut, Wataga, Williamsfield, Windsor, Woodhull, and Yates City. The district had been represented by Republican Daniel Swanson since January 11, 2017. Swanson faced neither any challengers in his primary nor any Democratic challenger in the general election.

Republican primary
Party	Candidate	Votes	%
Republican	Daniel Swanson (incumbent)	9,848	100.0
Total votes		9,848	100.0

General election
Party	Candidate	Votes	%
Republican	Daniel Swanson (incumbent)	36,925	100.0
Total votes		36,925	100.0
Republican hold			

=== District 75 ===
The 75th district, located in parts of the Chicago area, includes all or parts of Braceville, Braidwood, Carbon Hill, Channahon, Coal City, Diamond, Dwight, Godley, Joliet, Kinsman, Lake Holiday, Lakewood Shores, Lisbon, Marseilles, Mazon, Millbrook, Millington, Minooka, Morris, Newark, Oswego, Plano, Plattville, Ransom, Sandwich, Seneca, Sheridan, Verona, Wilmington, and Yorkville. The district had been represented by Republican David Welter since his appointment in July 2016. Welter faced neither any challengers in his primary nor any Democratic challenger in the general election.

Republican primary
Party	Candidate	Votes	%
Republican	David Welter (incumbent)	8,156	100.0
Total votes		8,156	100.0

General election
Party	Candidate	Votes	%
Republican	David Welter (incumbent)	34,366	100.0
Total votes		34,366	100.0
Republican hold			

== Districts 76–100 ==
=== District 76 ===
The 76th district covers all or parts of Arlington, Bureau Junction, Cedar Point, Cherry, Dalzell, Dayton, De Pue, Dover, Grand Ridge, Granville, Hennepin, Hollowayville, Kangley, LaSalle, Ladd, Magnolia, Malden, Mark, Marseilles, McNabb, Naplate, North Utica, Oglesby, Ottawa, Peru, Seatonville, Spring Valley, Standard, Streator, Tonica, and Troy Grove. The district had been represented by Republican Jerry Lee Long since January 11, 2017. The Democratic primary featured two candidates: Jill Bernal, registered nurse, member of the LaSalle County Board for the 8th district, and member of the Peru School Board; and Lance Yednock, business agent with Operating Engineers Local 150 and first-time candidate. Yednock became the Democratic nominee for the general election.

Democratic primary
Party	Candidate	Votes	%
Democratic	Lance Yednock	5,407	58.45
Democratic	Jill M. Bernal	3,844	41.55
Total votes		9,251	100.0

Republican primary
Party	Candidate	Votes	%
Republican	Jerry Lee Long (incumbent)	5,342	100.0
Total votes		5,342	100.0

General election
Party	Candidate	Votes	%
Democratic	Lance Yednock	21,185	55.06
Republican	Jerry Lee Long (incumbent)	17,293	44.94
Total votes		38,478	100.0
Democratic gain from Republican			

=== District 77 ===
The 77th district, located in the Chicago area, includes all or parts of Addison, Bellwood, Bensenville, Berkeley, Des Plaines, Elk Grove Village, Elmhurst, Franklink Park, Maywood, Melrose Park, Northlake, Rosemont, Stone Park, Villa Park, and Wood Dale as well parts of the Chicago neighborhood of O'Hare. The district had been represented by Democrat Kathleen Willis since January 9, 2013. The Republican nominee for this election was Anthony Airdo, sales director, former Republican candidate in the 2016 election, and church volunteer.

Democratic primary
Party	Candidate	Votes	%
Democratic	Kathleen Willis (incumbent)	5,440	100.0
Total votes		5,440	100.0

Republican primary
Party	Candidate	Votes	%
Republican	Anthony Airdo	2,440	100.0
Total votes		2,440	100.0

General election
Party	Candidate	Votes	%
Democratic	Kathleen Willis (incumbent)	15,420	70.58
Republican	Anthony Airdo	6,429	29.42
Total votes		21,849	100.0
Democratic hold			

=== District 78 ===
The 78th district, located in the Chicago area, includes parts of Elmwood Park, Franklin Park, Melrose Park, Oak Park, and River Grove and includes parts of the Chicago neighborhood of Austin. The district had been represented by Democrat Camille Lilly since her appointment in April 2010. Lilly faced no challengers in her primary nor any Republican challenger in the general election.

Democratic primary
Party	Candidate	Votes	%
Democratic	Camille Lilly (incumbent)	18,051	100.0
Total votes		18,051	100.0

General election
Party	Candidate	Votes	%
Democratic	Camille Lilly (incumbent)	36,237	100.0
Total votes		36,237	100.0
Democratic hold			

=== District 79 ===
The 79th district, located mostly in the Chicago area, includes all or parts of Aroma Park, Beecher, Bonfield, Bourbonnais, Braceville, Bradley, Buckingham, Cabery, Chebanse, Coal City, East Brooklyn, Essex, Gardner, Godley, Herscher, Hopkins Park, Irwin, Kankakee, Limestone, Momence, Peotone, Reddick, Sammons Point, South Wilmington, St. Anne, Sun River Terrace, and Union Hill. The district had been represented by Republican Lindsay Parkhurst since January 11, 2017. The Democratic nominee for this election was former state representative Lisa M. Dugan of the district from December 2003 to January 9, 2013. The race, dubbed a "battle royal" by the Daily Journal, was expected to cost in the millions of dollars.

Democratic primary
Party	Candidate	Votes	%
Democratic	Lisa M. Dugan	4,919	100.0
Total votes		4,919	100.0

Republican primary
Party	Candidate	Votes	%
Republican	Lindsay Parkhurst (incumbent)	5,263	100.0
Total votes		5,263	100.0

General election
Party	Candidate	Votes	%
Republican	Lindsay Parkhurst (incumbent)	19,702	56.13
Democratic	Lisa M. Dugan	15,397	43.87
Total votes		35,099	100.0
Republican hold			

=== District 80 ===
The 80th district, located in the Chicago area, includes all or parts of Chicago Heights, Flossmoor, Frankfort, Glenwood, Hazel Crest, Homewood, Joliet, Manhattan, Matteson, Mokena, Monee, New Lenox, Olympia Fields, Park Forest, Richton Park, South Chicago Heights, Steger, Symerton, University Park, and Wilmington. The district had been represented by Democrat Anthony DeLuca since his appointment in March 2009. DeLuca faced neither any challengers in his primary nor any Republican challenger in the general election.

Democratic primary
Party	Candidate	Votes	%
Democratic	Anthony DeLuca (incumbent)	12,640	100.0
Total votes		12,640	100.0

General election
Party	Candidate	Votes	%
Democratic	Anthony DeLuca (incumbent)	32,192	100.0
Total votes		32,192	100.0
Democratic hold			

=== District 81 ===
The 81st district, located in the Chicago area, includes parts of Bolingbrook, Darien, Downers Grove, Lisle, Naperville, Westmont, and Woodridge. The district had been represented by Republican David S. Olsen since his appointment on August 3, 2016. The Democratic nominee for this election was Anne Stava-Murray, former consumer researcher, member of the Naperville Board of Fire & Police, and former student non-voting member of the Naperville Board of Zoning Appeals from 2002 to 2004.

Democratic primary
Party	Candidate	Votes	%
Democratic	Anne M. Stava-Murray	10,935	100.0
Total votes		10,935	100.0

Republican primary
Party	Candidate	Votes	%
Republican	David S. Olsen (incumbent)	8,924	100.0
Total votes		8,924	100.0

General election
Party	Candidate	Votes	%
Democratic	Anne M. Stava-Murray	25,124	50.94
Republican	David S. Olsen (incumbent)	24,194	49.06
Total votes		49,318	100.0
Democratic gain from Republican			

=== District 82 ===
The 82nd district, located in the Chicago area, covers parts of Burr Ridge, Countryside, Darien, Hinsdale, Homer Glen, Indian Head Park, La Grange, Lemont, Lockport, Palos Park, Western Springs, Willow Springs, Willowbrook, and Woodridge. The district had been represented by Republican Leader Jim Durkin since his January 2006 appointment. He previously served in the Illinois House from January 1995 to January 2003.

Durkin was challenged by Burr Ridge Mayor Mickey Straub. Straub was backed by radio host and political operative Dan Proft. While Michael Madigan was challenged by Jason Gonzalez in 2016, it is rare that one of the "four tops" is challenged, let alone in a primary election. On October 26, 2017, Durkin was endorsed by a number of Republican mayors from DuPage County. Durkin became the Republican nominee for the general election.

Republican primary endorsements

Jim Durkin

Mayors

- Kevin Burns, mayor of Geneva, Illinois
- Roger Claar, mayor of Bolingbrook, Illinois
- Franco Coladipietro, village president of Bloomingdale, Illinois
- Rodney Craig, mayor of Hanover Park, Illinois
- Frank DeSimone, village president of Bensenville, Illinois
- Alice Gallagher, village president of Western Springs, Illinois
- Richard Irvin, mayor of Aurora, Illinois
- Andy Maglio, mayor of Roselle, Illinois
- Ruben Pineda, mayor of West Chicago, Illinois
- Nunzio Pulice, mayor of Wood Dale, Illinois
- Tony Ragucci, mayor of Oakbrook Terrace, Illinois
- Frank Saverino, mayor of Carol Stream, Illinois
- Frank Trilla, mayor of Willowbrook, Illinois
- Rich Veenstra, mayor of Addison, Illinois
- George Yukich, mayor of Homer Glen, Illinois

The Democratic nominee for this election was Tom Chlystek, alderman for the City of Darien in Ward 4.

Democratic primary
Party	Candidate	Votes	%
Democratic	Tom Chlystek	8,239	100.0
Total votes		8,239	100.0

Republican primary
Party	Candidate	Votes	%
Republican	Jim Durkin (incumbent)	6,798	67.58
Republican	Michael "Mickey" Straub	3,261	32.42
Total votes		10,059	100.0

General election
Party	Candidate	Votes	%
Republican	Jim Durkin (incumbent)	29,672	61.82
Democratic	Tom Chlystek	18,329	38.18
Total votes		48,001	100.0
Republican hold			

=== District 83 ===
The 83rd district, located in the Chicago area, includes parts of Aurora, Montgomery, and North Aurora. The district had been represented by Democrat Linda Chapa LaVia since January 8, 2003. LaVia faced neither any challengers in her primary nor any Republican challenger in the general election.

Democratic primary
Party	Candidate	Votes	%
Democratic	Linda Chapa LaVia (incumbent)	4,944	100.0
Total votes		4,944	100.0

General election
Party	Candidate	Votes	%
Democratic	Linda Chapa LaVia (incumbent)	15,303	100.0
Total votes		15,303	100.0
Democratic hold			

=== District 84 ===
The 84th district, located in the Chicago area, covers parts of Aurora, Boulder Hill, Montgomery, Naperville, and Oswego. The district had been represented by Democrat Stephanie Kifowit since January 9, 2013. The Republican nominee for this election was Patty Smith, an ABA certified paralegal at Prairie State Legal Services, chairwoman of the Western Suburb National Association for Down Syndrome, and board member and parent advocate for Gigi's Playhouse Fox Valley.

Democratic primary
Party	Candidate	Votes	%
Democratic	Stephanie A. Kifowit (incumbent)	6,382	100.0
Total votes		6,382	100.0

Republican primary
Party	Candidate	Votes	%
Republican	Patty Smith	2,985	100.0
Total votes		2,985	100.0

General election
Party	Candidate	Votes	%
Democratic	Stephanie A. Kifowit (incumbent)	21,057	66.24
Republican	Patty Smith	10,733	33.76
Total votes		31,790	100.0
Democratic hold			

=== District 85 ===
The 85th district, located in the Chicago area, covers parts of Bolingbrook, Crest Hill, Fairmont, Lemont, Lockport, Naperville, Romeoville, and Woodridge. The district had been represented by Democrat Emily McAsey since January 14, 2009. McAsey resigned from her seat on June 2, 2017, to, according to the Daily Southtown, "join her husband who accepted a job out of state." John Connor, a prosecutor for Will County for 14 years, was named to fill the seat in June 2017. The Republican nominee for this election was originally slated to be Lisa Bickus, but she later withdrew from the race at an unknown date.

Democratic primary
Party	Candidate	Votes	%
Democratic	John Connor (incumbent)	7,667	100.0
Total votes		7,667	100.0

Republican primary
Party	Candidate	Votes	%
Republican	Lisa Bickus	3,618	100.0
Total votes		3,618	100.0

General election
Party	Candidate	Votes	%
Democratic	John Connor (incumbent)	26,599	100.0
Total votes		26,599	100.0
Democratic hold			

=== District 86 ===
The 86th district, located in the Chicago area, covers all or parts of Channahon, Crest Hill, Elmwood, Ingalls Park, Joliet, New Lenox, Preston Heights, Rockdale, and Shorewood. The district had been represented by Democrat Larry Walsh Jr. since his appointment in April 2012. The Republican nominee for this election was Rick Laib, sergeant of the Will County Sheriff's Office, formerly a part of the United States Army Reserve, who in his police work was assigned as an Honor Guard and a member of the SWAT team.

Democratic primary
Party	Candidate	Votes	%
Democratic	Lawrence "Larry" Walsh Jr. (incumbent)	7,579	100.0
Total votes		7,579	100.0

Republican primary
Party	Candidate	Votes	%
Republican	Rick Laib	3,161	100.0
Total votes		3,161	100.0

General election
Party	Candidate	Votes	%
Democratic	Lawrence "Larry" Walsh Jr. (incumbent)	21,070	70.11
Republican	Rick Laib	8,981	29.89
Total votes		30,051	100.0
Democratic hold			

=== District 87 ===
The 87th district, located within the Springfield metropolitan area, includes all or parts of Armington, Athens, Atlanta, Beason, Broadwell, Buffalo, Cantrall, Chestnut, Clear Lake, Cornland, Dawson, Delavan, Elkhart, Emden, Grandview, Green Valley, Greenview, Hartsburg, Hopedale, Illiopolis, Lake Petersburg, Latham, Lincoln, Mechanicsburg, Middletown, Minier, Morton, Mount Pulaski, New Holland, Oakford, Pekin, Petersburg, Riverton, Rochester, San Jose, Sherman, Spaulding, Springfield, Tallula, Tremon, and Williamsville. The district had been represented by Republican Tim Butler since his appointment in March 2015. Butler faced neither any challengers in his primary nor any Democratic challengers in the general election.

Republican primary
Party	Candidate	Votes	%
Republican	Tim Butler (incumbent)	11,379	100.0
Total votes		11,379	100.0

General election
Party	Candidate	Votes	%
Republican	Tim Butler (incumbent)	34,783	100.0
Total votes		34,783	100.0
Republican hold			

=== District 88 ===
The 88th district, located in parts of the Peoria metropolitan area and Bloomington–Normal area, covers all or parts of Bloomington, Danvers, Deer Creek, East Peoria, Goodfield, Heritage Lake, Mackinaw, McLean, Morton, Normal, Pekin, Stanford, Twin Grove, and Washington. The district had been represented by Republican Keith P. Sommer since January 13, 1999. The Democratic nominee for this election was Jill Blair, communications analyst for Country Financial, former dean of adult education at Heartland Community College, and former full-time coordinator of the ESL program at the college.

Democratic primary
Party	Candidate	Votes	%
Democratic	Jill Blair	6,735	100.0
Total votes		6,735	100.0

Republican primary
Party	Candidate	Votes	%
Republican	Keith P. Sommer (incumbent)	10,331	100.0
Total votes		10,331	100.0

General election
Party	Candidate	Votes	%
Republican	Keith P. Sommer (incumbent)	26,126	58.66
Democratic	Jill Blair	18,412	41.34
Total votes		44,538	100.0
Republican hold			

=== District 89 ===
The 89th district covers all or parts of Adeline, Apple Canyon Lake, Apple River, Cedarville, Chadwick, Coleta, Dakota, Davis, Durand, East Dubuque, Elizabeth, Forreston, Freeport, Galena, The Galena Territory, German Valley, Hanover, Lake Summerset, Lanark, Leaf River, Lena, Menominee, Milledgeville, Mount Carroll, Mount Morris, Nora, Orangeville, Pearl City, Pecatonica, Ridott, Rock City, Rockford, Scales Mound, Shannon, Stockton, Warren, Winnebago, and Winslow. The district had been represented by Republican Brian W. Stewart since his appointment in October 2013. Stewart announced on September 6, 2017, that he would run for the seat of retiring state senator Tim Bivins, leaving his own seat open. The Republican primary featured two candidates: Andrew Chesney, small business owner and licensed real estate agent, chairman of the Stephenson County Republican Party, and an alderman of Freeport; and Steve Fricke, owner/operator of Triple Creek Farms, member of the Stephenson County board, and member of the Stephenson County Farmland Assessment Committee. Chesney became the Republican nominee for the general election. The Democratic nominee for this election was Nick Hyde, attorney, former worker for Senator Dick Durbin, and former volunteer for the Legislative Technical Review Office in the Illinois General Assembly. After winning the election, Chesney was appointed to the seat for the 100th General Assembly on December 5, 2018.

Democratic primary
Party	Candidate	Votes	%
Democratic	Nicholas P. Hyde	4,875	100.0
Total votes		4,875	100.0

Republican primary
Party	Candidate	Votes	%
Republican	Andrew S. Chesney	7,327	53.54
Republican	Steven R. Fricke	6,357	46.46
Total votes		13,684	100.0

General election
Party	Candidate	Votes	%
Republican	Andrew S. Chesney	25,485	61.84
Democratic	Nicholas P. Hyde	15,725	38.16
Total votes		41,120	100.0
Republican hold			

=== District 90 ===
The 90th district covers all or parts of Amboy, Ashton, Byron, Compton, Creston, Davis Junction, DeKalb, Dixon, Earlville, Franklin Grove, Grand Detour, Hillcrest, Lake Holiday, Lee, Leland, Lost Nation, Malta, Mendota, Monroe Center, Nelson, Oregon, Paw Paw, Polo, Rochelle, Sandwich, Shabbona, Somonauk, Steward, Stillman Valley, Sublette, Waterman, and West Brooklyn. The district had been represented by Republican Tom Demmer since January 9, 2013. The Democratic nominee for this election was Amy Davis, a retired educator who was involved in the Action for a Better Tomorrow organization.

Democratic primary
Party	Candidate	Votes	%
Democratic	Amy Davis	5,190	100.0
Total votes		5,190	100.0

Republican primary
Party	Candidate	Votes	%
Republican	Tom Demmer (incumbent)	9,284	100.0
Total votes		9,284	100.0

General election
Party	Candidate	Votes	%
Republican	Tom Demmer (incumbent)	23,690	61.18
Democratic	Amy Davis	15,030	38.82
Total votes		38,720	100.0
Republican hold			

=== District 91 ===
The 91st district, located in the Peoria metropolitan area, includes all or parts of Banner, Bartonville, Bryant, Canton, Creve Coeur, Cuba, Dunfermline, East Peoria, Fairview, Farmington, Glasford, Hanna City, Kingston Mines, Lake Camelot, Lewistown, Liverpool, Mapleton, Marquette Heights, Morton, Norris, North Pekin, Norwood, Pekin, South Pekin, and St. David. The district had been represented by Republican Mike Unes since January 12, 2011. He was an Assistant Republican Leader in the Illinois House during the 100th General Assembly. According to Illinois Election Data, the 91st district was the 4th most Democratic district represented by a Republican during the election. The Democratic challenger in this election was Carolyn Blodgett, a member of the Fulton County Board, caseworker for the Lewistown Department of Human Services, and AFSCME union steward.

Democratic primary
Party	Candidate	Votes	%
Democratic	Carolyn Blodgett	6,319	100.0
Total votes		6,319	100.0

Republican primary
Party	Candidate	Votes	%
Republican	Mike Unes (incumbent)	7,022	100.0
Total votes		7,022	100.0

General election
Party	Candidate	Votes	%
Republican	Mike Unes (incumbent)	22,902	63.9
Democratic	Carolyn Blodgett	12,915	36.1
Total votes		35,817	100.0
Republican hold			

=== District 92 ===
The 92nd district, located at the heart of the Peoria metropolitan area, covers all or parts of Bartonville, Bellevue, Peoria, Peoria Heights, and West Peoria. The district had been represented by Democrat Jehan Gordon-Booth since January 14, 2009. She was an Assistant Majority Leader of the Illinois House from 2015 to 2019. She faced neither any challengers in her primary nor any Republican challengers in the general election.

Democratic primary
Party	Candidate	Votes	%
Democratic	Jehan Gordon-Booth (incumbent)	7,375	100.0
Total votes		7,375	100.0

General election
Party	Candidate	Votes	%
Democratic	Jehan Gordon-Booth (incumbent)	26,808	100.0
Total votes		26,808	100.0
Democratic hold			

=== District 93 ===
The 93rd district represents all or parts of Abingdon, Adair, Alexis, Arenzville, Ashland, Astoria, Avon, Bardolph, Bath, Beardstown, Blandinsville, Browning, Bushnell, Camden, Chandlerville, Colchester, Easton, Ellisville, Forest City, Galesburg, Georgetown, Good Hope, Goofy Ridge, Havana, Industry, Ipava, Kilbourne, Littleton, London Mills, Macomb, Manito, Marietta, Mason City, Mound Station, Mount Sterling, Plymouth, Prairie City, Ripley, Rushville, San Jose, Sciota, Smithfield, St. Augustine, Table Grove, Tennessee, Topeka, Vermont, Versailles, and Virginia. The district had been represented by Republican Norine Hammond since her appointment in December 2010. As a result of Hammond's yea votes to overturn Governor Rauner's vetoes during the Illinois Budget Impasse, she faced a Republican challenger, Joshua Griffith, first-time candidate and manager of a roofing company in Galesburg. After winning her primary, Hammond faced Democratic challenger John Curtis, owner of Barefoot Gardens CSA and public school teacher, in the general election.

Democratic primary
Party	Candidate	Votes	%
Democratic	John Curtis	4,710	100.0
Total votes		4,710	100.0

Republican primary
Party	Candidate	Votes	%
Republican	Norine Hammond (incumbent)	5,227	53.83
Republican	Joshua Griffith	4,483	46.17
Total votes		9,710	100.0

General election
Party	Candidate	Votes	%
Republican	Norine Hammond (incumbent)	17,870	52.2
Democratic	John Curtis	16,365	47.8
Total votes		34,235	100.0
Republican hold			

=== District 94 ===
The 94th district represents all or parts of Augusta, Basco, Bentley, Biggsville, Bowen, Camp Point, Carthage, Clayton, Coatsburg, Columbus, Dallas City, Elvaston, Ferris, Gladstone, Golden, Gulf Port, Hamilton, Kirkwood, La Harpe, La Prairie, Liberty, Lima, Little York, Lomax, Loraine, Media, Mendon, Monmouth, Nauvoo, Oquawka, Payson, Plainville, Plymouth, Pontoosuc, Quincy, Raritan, Roseville, Stronghurst, Ursa, Warsaw, and West Point. The district had been represented by Republican Randy Frese since January 14, 2015. Democrat Richard Cramsey, former 30 year pharmaceutical employee and farmer, entered the race to challenge Frese after the primary election.

Republican primary
Party	Candidate	Votes	%
Republican	Randy Frese (incumbent)	7,476	100.0
Total votes		7,476	100.0

General election
Party	Candidate	Votes	%
Republican	Randy Frese (incumbent)	27,858	71.6
Democratic	Richard Cramsey	11,059	28.4
Total votes		38,917	100.0
Republican hold			

=== District 95 ===
The 95th district includes all or parts of Assumption, Benld, Brighton, Bunker Hill, Butler, Carlinville, Coalton, Coffeen, Donnellson, Dorchester, Eagarville, East Gillespie, Farmersville, Fillmore, Gillespie, Girard, Harvel, Hillsboro, Holiday Shores, Irving, Lake Ka-Ho, Litchfield, Livingston, Medora, Morrisonville, Mount Clare, Mount Olive, Moweaqua, New Douglas, Nilwood, Nokomis, Ohlman, Owaneco, Palmer, Pana, Panama, Raymond, Royal Lakes, Sawyerville, Schram City, Shipman, Standard City, Staunton, Stonington, Taylor Springs, Taylorville, Virden, Waggoner, Walshville, Wenonah, White City, Williamson, Witt, and Worden. The district had been represented by Republican Avery Bourne since her appointment in February 2015. Bourne faced Democratic challenger Dillon Clark, a Montgomery County board member and a compliance officer at the Litchfield National Bank.

Democratic primary
Party	Candidate	Votes	%
Democratic	Dillon Clark	6,288	100.0
Total votes		6,288	100.0

Republican primary
Party	Candidate	Votes	%
Republican	Avery Bourne (incumbent)	7,457	100.0
Total votes		7,457	100.0

General election
Party	Candidate	Votes	%
Republican	Avery Bourne (incumbent)	24,551	59.82
Democratic	Dillon Clark	16,488	40.17
Write-in		5	0.01
Total votes		41,044	100.0
Republican hold			

=== District 96 ===
The 96th district, located in the Springfield metropolitan area, includes all or parts of Blue Mound, Boody, Bulpitt, Decatur, Edinburg, Harristown, Jeisyville, Kincaid, Mount Auburn, Niantic, Rochester, Springfield, Stonington, Taylorville, and Tovey. The district had been represented by Democrat Sue Scherer since January 9, 2013. The Republican challenger in this election was Herman Senor, alderman for Springfield's Ward 2 who worked more than 25 years for the Illinois Department of Transportation.

Democratic primary
Party	Candidate	Votes	%
Democratic	Sue Scherer (incumbent)	6,876	100.0
Total votes		6,876	100.0

Republican primary
Party	Candidate	Votes	%
Republican	Herman Senor	3,930	100.0
Total votes		3,930	100.0

General election
Party	Candidate	Votes	%
Democratic	Sue Scherer (incumbent)	19,882	60.73
Republican	Herman Senor	12,845	39.24
Write-in		10	0.03
Total votes		32,737	100.0
Democratic hold			

=== District 97 ===
The 97th district, located in the Chicago area, includes parts of Aurora, Bolingbrook, Boulder Hill, Channahon, Joliet, Montgomery, Naperville, Oswego, Plainfield, Romeoville, and Shorewood. The district had been represented by Republican Mark Batinick since January 14, 2015. The Democratic challenger in this election was Mica Freeman, a fifth grade teacher and a ParentWISE volunteer through Anne & Robert H. Lurie Children's Hospital of Chicago.

Democratic primary
Party	Candidate	Votes	%
Democratic	Mica Freeman	7,270	100.0
Total votes		7,270	100.0

Republican primary
Party	Candidate	Votes	%
Republican	Mark Batinick (incumbent)	6,584	100.0
Total votes		6,584	100.0

General election
Party	Candidate	Votes	%
Republican	Mark Batinick (incumbent)	22,480	50.7
Democratic	Mica Freeman	21,890	49.3
Total votes		44,370	100.0
Republican hold			

=== District 98 ===
The 98th district, located in the Chicago area, includes all or parts of Bolingbrook, Crest Hill, Crystal Lawns, Joliet, Romeoville, and Shorewood. The district had been represented by Democrat Natalie Manley since January 9, 2013. The Republican challenger in the general election was Alyssia Benford, accountant, president of the Rotary Club of Bolingbrook, and a member of the board of directors for the United Way of Will County.

Democratic primary
Party	Candidate	Votes	%
Democratic	Natalie Manley (incumbent)	8,241	100.0
Total votes		8,241	100.0

Republican primary
Party	Candidate	Votes	%
Republican	Alyssia Benford	4,238	100.0
Total votes		4,238	100.0

General election
Party	Candidate	Votes	%
Democratic	Natalie Manley (incumbent)	24,318	63.9
Republican	Alyssia Benford	13,741	36.1
Total votes		38,059	100.0
Democratic hold			

=== District 99 ===
The 99th district, located in the Springfield metropolitan area, covers all or parts of Auburn, Berlin, Chatham, Curran, Divernon, Jerome, Leland Grove, Loami, New Berlin, Pawnee, Pleasant Plains, Southern View, Springfield, Thayer, and Virden. The district had been represented by Republican Sara Wojcicki Jimenez since November 2015. Jimenez announced that she would not seek reelection in 2018, leaving her seat open for other candidates. The Republican primary featured Mike Murphy, US Army and Illinois National Guard veteran, former member of the school board and village board of Divernon, and restaurateur. Steven Westerfield, originally on the Republican primary ballot, was kicked off due to invalid signatures, and filed as a write-in candidate for the primary. The Democratic challenger in this election was Marc Bell, former Illinois State Police officer for 28 years and member of the executive board of the NOBLE Land of Lincoln Chapter, who previously served on the board of directors for Big Brothers, Big Sisters of the Illinois Capitol Region.

Democratic primary
Party	Candidate	Votes	%
Democratic	Marc Bell	6,939	100.0
Total votes		6,939	100.0

Republican primary
Party	Candidate	Votes	%
Republican	Mike Murphy	9,317	99.38
Republican	Steven Westerfield	58	0.62
Total votes		9,375	100.0

General election
Party	Candidate	Votes	%
Republican	Mike Murphy	30,909	58.8
Democratic	Marc Bell	21,637	41.2
Total votes		52,546	100.0
Republican hold			

=== District 100 ===
The 100th district, located in parts of the Metro East, covers all or parts of Alsey, Batchtown, Baylis, Bluffs, Brighton, Brussels, Carrollton, Chapin, Chesterfield, Concord, Detroit, El Dara, Eldred, Exeter, Fidelity, Fieldon, Florence, Franklin, Glasgow, Godfrey, Grafton, Greenfield, Griggsville, Hamburg, Hardin, Hettick, Hillview, Hull, Jacksonville, Jerseyville, Kampsville, Kane, Kinderhook, Lynnville, Manchester, Meredosia, Milton, Modesto, Murrayville, Naples, Nebo, New Canton, New Salem, Otterville, Palmyra, Peal, Perry, Pittsfield, Pleasant Hill, Rockbridge, Roodhouse, Scottville, South Jacksonville, Time, Valley City, Waverly, White Hall, Wilmington, Winchester, and Woodson. The district had been represented by Republican C. D. Davidsmeyer since his appointment in December 2012. Davidsmeyer faced a primary challenge from business owner Jonas Petty. After winning his primary, Davidsmeyer faced no Democratic challenger in the general election.

Republican primary
Party	Candidate	Votes	%
Republican	C. D. Davidsmeyer (incumbent)	9,036	75.06
Republican	Jonas Petty	3,002	24.94
Total votes		12,038	100.0

General election
Party	Candidate	Votes	%
Republican	C. D. Davidsmeyer (incumbent)	33,271	100.0
Write-in		1	0.0
Total votes		33,272	100.0
Republican hold			

== Districts 101–118 ==
=== District 101 ===
The 101st district, located partly in the Bloomington-Normal area, covers all or parts of Argenta, Arrowsmith, Atwood, Bellflower, Bement, Cerro Gorod, Champaign, Cisco, Clinton, De Land, De Witt, Decatur, Downs, Ellsworth, Farmer City, Fisher, Foosland, Forsyth, Hammond, Heyworth, Ivesdale, Kenney, Lake of the Woods, LaPlace, Le Roy, Long Creek, Ludlow, Mahomet, Mansfield, Maroa, Monticello, Mount Zion, Niantic, Oreana, Saybrook, Wapella, Warrensburg, Waynesville, Weldon, and White Heath. The district had been represented by Republican Bill Mitchell since January 9, 2013, who had been serving the Illinois House of Representatives since 1999. On August 3, 2017, Mitchell announced he would not run for another term in the Illinois House. Former Decatur city councilman and Eastern Illinois University trustee Dan Caulkins ran as the Republican candidate. Jen McMillin, annual giving officer at Lincoln College, ran as the Democratic candidate.

Democratic primary
Party	Candidate	Votes	%
Democratic	Jennifer McMillin	6,176	100.0
Total votes		6,176	100.0

Republican primary
Party	Candidate	Votes	%
Republican	Dan Caulkins	6,112	43.94
Republican	Randy Keith	5,282	37.98
Republican	Todd Hendricks	2,515	18.08
Total votes		13,909	100.0

General election
Party	Candidate	Votes	%
Republican	Dan Caulkins	33,043	69.68
Democratic	Jennifer McMillin	14,379	30.32
Total votes		47,422	100.0
Republican hold			

=== District 102 ===
The 102nd district covers parts of the Champaign-Urbana metropolitan area, including all or parts of Allenville, Allerton, Arcola, Arthur, Atwood, Bethany, Bondville, Broadlands, Brocton, Camargo, Champaign, Chrisman, Cowden, Fairmount, Findlay, Garrett, Gays, Herrick, Hindsboro, Homer, Hume, Ivesdale, Longview, Lovington, Macon, Metcalf, Mount Zion, Moweaqua, Newman, Oconee, Pana, Paris, Pesotum, Philo, Redmon, Sadorus, Savoy, Seymour, Shelbyville, Sidell, Sidney, Sigel, St. Joseph, Stewardson, Strasburg, Sullivan, Tolono, Tower Hill, Tuscola, Vermilion, Villa Grove, Westervelt, and Windsor. The district had been represented by Republican Brad Halbrook since January 11, 2017, previously serving the 110th district in the Illinois House of Representatives from April 2012 to January 2015. Halbrook faced neither any Republican challenger in his primary nor any Democratic challenger in the general election.

Republican primary
Party	Candidate	Votes	%
Republican	Brad Halbrook (incumbent)	11,184	100.0
Total votes		11,184	100.0

General election
Party	Candidate	Votes	%
Republican	Brad Halbrook (incumbent)	35,206	100.0
Total votes		35,206	100.0
Republican hold			

=== District 103 ===
The 103rd district covers the heart of the Champaign–Urbana metropolitan area, including most of Champaign and Urbana. The district had been represented by Democrat Carol Ammons since January 14, 2015. Ammons faced neither any Democratic challenger in her primary nor any Republican challenger in the general election.

Democratic primary
Party	Candidate	Votes	%
Democratic	Carol Ammons (incumbent)	9,017	100.0
Total votes		9,017	100.0

General election
Party	Candidate	Votes	%
Democratic	Carol Ammons (incumbent)	30,802	100.0
Total votes		30,802	100.0
Democratic hold			

=== District 104 ===
The 104th district covers parts of the Champaign-Urbana metropolitan area, including all or parts of Belgium, Catlin, Champaign, Danville, Fithian, Georgetown, Gifford, Indianola, Muncie, Oakwood, Olivet, Penfield, Rantoul, Ridge Farm, Royal, Savoy, Thomasboro, Tilton, and Westville. The district had been represented by Republican Chad Hays since December 2010. On July 7, 2017, Hays announced his retirement from the Illinois House, citing the budget impasse. Vermillion County Board Chairman Mike Marron was appointed to Hays' seat on September 7, 2018, and was the Republican nominee in this election. Cindy Cunningham, who formerly directed adult day care services at the Champaign County Nursing Home, was the Democratic challenger in this election.

Democratic primary
Party	Candidate	Votes	%
Democratic	Cindy Cunningham	4,153	64.59
Democratic	Frank McCullough Jr.	2,277	35.41
Total votes		6,430	100.0

Republican primary
Party	Candidate	Votes	%
Republican	Mike Marron	7,097	100.0
Total votes		7,097	100.0

General election
Party	Candidate	Votes	%
Republican	Mike Marron (incumbent)	20,348	55.92
Democratic	Cindy Cunningham	16,041	44.08
Total votes		36,389	100.0
Republican hold			

=== District 105 ===
The 105th district, located in the Bloomington-Normal area, includes all or parts of Anchor, Bloomington, Carlock, Chenoa, Colfax, Cooksville, Downs, El Paso, Fairbury, Forrest, Gridley, Hudson, Lexington, Normal, Strawn, and Towanda. The district had been represented by Republican Dan Brady since January 9, 2013, who formerly represented the 88th district from January 10, 2001, to January 9, 2013. The Democratic challenger in this election was Illinois State University Laboratory Schools' English and theater teacher Ben Webb. This was the first time since 2000 that Brady had faced a Democratic challenger.

Democratic primary
Party	Candidate	Votes	%
Democratic	Ben Webb	6,998	100.0
Total votes		6,998	100.0

Republican primary
Party	Candidate	Votes	%
Republican	Dan Brady (incumbent)	7,699	74.07
Republican	David Blumenshine	2,695	25.93
Total votes		10,394	100.0

General election
Party	Candidate	Votes	%
Republican	Dan Brady (incumbent)	26,486	60.42
Democratic	Ben Webb	17,349	39.58
Total votes		43,835	100.0
Republican hold			

=== District 106 ===
The 106th district covers parts of the Champaign-Urbana metropolitan area, including all or parts of Alvan, Ashkum, Beaverville, Benson, Bismarck, Buckley, Cabery, Campus, Chatsworth, Chebanse, Cissna Park, Clifton, Congerville, Cornell, Crescent City, Cullom, Danforth, Deer Creek, Donovan, Dwight, El Paso, Elliott, Emington, Eureka, Flanagan, Forrest, Gibson City, Gilman, Goodfield, Henning, Hoopeston, Iroquois, Kappa, Kempton, Loda, Long Point, Martinton, Melvin, Milford, Minonk, Odell, Onarga, Panola, Papineau, Paxton, Piper City, Pontiac, Potomac, Rankin, Reddick, Roanoke, Roberts, Rossville, Saunemin, Secor, Sheldon, Sibley, Thawville, Watseka, Wellington, and Woodland. The district had been represented by Republican Tom Bennett since January 14, 2015. Bennett faced neither any primary challengers nor Democratic challengers before the 2018 general election.

Republican primary
Party	Candidate	Votes	%
Republican	Tom Bennett (incumbent)	13,374	100.0
Total votes		13,374	100.0

General election
Party	Candidate	Votes	%
Republican	Tom Bennett (incumbent)	32,952	100.0
Total votes		32,952	100.0
Republican hold			

=== District 107 ===
The 107th district includes all or parts of Alma, Altamont, Beecher City, Bingham, Brownstown, Central City, Centralia, Edgewood, Effingham, Farina, Greenville, Iuka, Junction City, Kell, Keyesport, Kinmundy, Mason, Mulberry Grove, Odin, Old Ripley, Panama, Patoka, Pierron, Pocahontas, Ramsey, Salem, Sandoval, Shumway, Smithboro, Sorento, St. Elmo, St. Peter, Teutopolis, Vandalia, Vernon, Walnut Hill, Wamac, and Watson. The district had been represented by Republican John Cavaletto since January 14, 2009. Cavaletto announced he would not seek another term on September 18, 2017. Former Illinois Army National Guard veteran and former Fayette County Board member Blaine Wilhour ran as the Republican challenger in this election. Former high school teacher of Effingham High School and St. Anthony High School and Lake Land College history instructor David Seiler ran as the Democratic challenger.

Democratic primary
Party	Candidate	Votes	%
Democratic	David Seiler	3,872	100.0
Total votes		3,872	100.0

Republican primary
Party	Candidate	Votes	%
Republican	Blaine Wilhour	6,313	60.37
Republican	Laura Myers	4,145	39.63
Total votes		10,458	100.0

General election
Party	Candidate	Votes	%
Republican	Blaine Wilhour	27,112	69.71
Democratic	David Seiler	11,779	30.29
Total votes		38,891	100.0
Republican hold			

=== District 108 ===
The 108th district, located in the Metro East, includes all or parts of Addieville, Albers, Alhambra, Aviston, Bartelso, Beckemeyer, Breese, Carlyle, Centralia, Damiansville, Edwardsville, Germantown, Grantfork, Hamel, Highland, Hoffman, Hoyleton, Huey, Irvington, Marine, Maryville, Mascoutah, Nashville, New Baden, New Minden, O’Fallon, Oakdale, Okawville, Pierron, Richview, St. Jacob, Summerfield, Trenton, Troy, and Venedy. The district had been represented by Republican Charles Meier since January 9, 2013. Meier faced primary challenger Madison County board member Don Moore. After winning the nomination, Meier faced no Democratic challenger in the general election.

Republican primary
Party	Candidate	Votes	%
Republican	Charles Meier (incumbent)	9,096	71.57
Republican	Don Moore	3,614	28.43
Total votes		12,710	100.0

General election
Party	Candidate	Votes	%
Republican	Charles Meier (incumbent)	38,987	100.0
Total votes		38,987	100.0
Republican hold			

=== District 109 ===
The 109th district, located in the Illinois Wabash Valley, includes all or parts of Albion, Allendale, Bellmont, Bone Gap, Bridgeport, Browns, Burnt Prairie, Calhoun, Carmi, Cisne, Claremont, Clay City, Crossville, Dieterich, Enfield, Fairfield, Flora, Golden Gate, Grayville, Iola, Jeffersonville, Johnsonville, Keenes, Keensburg, Louisville, Maunie, Montrose, Mount Carmel, Mount Erie, Newtown, Noble, Norris City, Olney, Parkersburg, Phillipstown, Rose Hill, Sailor Springs, Sims, Springerton, St. Francisville, Ste. Marie, Sumner, Teutopolis, Watson, Wayne City, West Salem, Wheeler, Willow Hill, Xenia, and Yale. The district had been represented by Republican David Reis since January 12, 2005. Reis was challenged by farmer and North Clay Board of Education member Darren Bailey. In a rare victory for candidates supported by Dan Proft's Liberty Principles PAC, Bailey defeated Reis in the 2018 Republican primary. Bailey then defeated Democratic candidate Cynthia Given, the Secretary of the Richland County Democratic Party, in the staunchly Republican district.

Democratic primary
Party	Candidate	Votes	%
Democratic	Cynthia Given	3,572	100.0
Total votes		3,572	100.0

Republican primary
Party	Candidate	Votes	%
Republican	Darren Bailey	9,729	56.76
Republican	David Reis (incumbent)	7,411	43.24
Total votes		17,140	100.0

General election
Party	Candidate	Votes	%
Republican	Darren Bailey	30,048	76.14
Democratic	Cynthia Given	9,417	23.86
Total votes		39,465	100.0
Republican hold			

=== District 110 ===
The 110th district includes all or parts of Annapolis, Ashmore, Casey, Charleston, Flat Rock, Greenup, Humboldt, Hutsonville, Jewett, Kansas, Lawrenceville, Lerna, Marshall, Martinsville, Mattoon, Neoga, Oakland, Oblong, Palestine, Robinson, Russellville, Stoy, Toledo, West Union, West York, and Westfield. The district had been represented by Republican Reggie Phillips since January 14, 2015. On September 22, 2017, Phillips announced he would not run for a third term. The Republican challenger in this election was owner of the Miller Brothers Farms Chris Miller. The Democratic challenger was retired Eastern Illinois University professor Shirley Bell.

Democratic primary
Party	Candidate	Votes	%
Democratic	Shirley Bell	3,998	100.0
Total votes		3,998	100.0

Republican primary
Party	Candidate	Votes	%
Republican	Chris Miller	10,302	65.34
Republican	Terry Davis	5,465	34.66
Total votes		15,767	100.0

General election
Party	Candidate	Votes	%
Republican	Chris Miller	23,955	65.37
Democratic	Shirley Bell	12,691	34.63
Total votes		36,646	100.0
Republican hold			

=== District 111 ===
The 111th district, located in the Metro East, includes all or parts of Alton, Bethalto, East Alton, Edwardsville, Elsah, Godfrey, Granite City, Hartford, Holiday Shores, Madison, Mitchell, Pontoon Beach, Rosewood Heights, Roxana, South Roxana, and Wood River. The district had been represented by Democrat Dan Beiser since his appointment in 2004. According to Illinois Election Data, the 111th district was the 4th most Republican district represented by a Democrat during the election. Beiser announced his retirement from the Illinois House of Representatives on August 30, 2017. Monica Bristow, president of the RiverBend Growth Association, was sworn in on December 19, 2017, as his replacement. She was the Democratic candidate for the general election. The Republican challenger in this election was the Wood River Township Supervisor Mike Babcock, who ran for the 111th district in the past.

Democratic primary
Party	Candidate	Votes	%
Democratic	Monica Bristow (incumbent)	7,012	100.0
Total votes		7,012	100.0

Republican primary
Party	Candidate	Votes	%
Republican	Mike Babcock	5,641	100.0
Total votes		5,641	100.0

General election
Party	Candidate	Votes	%
Democratic	Monica Bristow (incumbent)	19,095	50.47
Republican	Mike Babcock	18,739	49.53
Total votes		37,834	100.0
Democratic hold			

=== District 112 ===
The 112th district, located in the Metro East, includes all or parts of Bethalto, Caseyville, Collinsville, Edwardsville, Fairmont City, Fairview Heights, Glen Carbon, Granite City, Madison, Maryville, O'Fallon, Pontoon Beach, Roxana, Shiloh, Swansea, and Wood River. The district had been represented by Democrat Katie Stuart since January 11, 2017. According to Illinois Election Data, the 112th district was the 3rd most Republican district represented by a Democrat during the election. Dwight Kay, former representative of the district, was the Republican challenger in this election.

Democratic primary
Party	Candidate	Votes	%
Democratic	Katie Stuart (incumbent)	8,601	100.0
Total votes		8,601	100.0

Republican primary
Party	Candidate	Votes	%
Republican	Dwight Kay	4,356	58.10
Republican	Wendy Erhart	3,141	41.90
Total votes		7,497	100.0

General election
Party	Candidate	Votes	%
Democratic	Katie Stuart (incumbent)	24,807	55.07
Republican	Dwight Kay	20,239	44.93
Total votes		45,046	100.0
Democratic hold			

=== District 113 ===
The 113th district, located in the Metro East, includes all or parts of Belleville, Brooklyn, Caseyville, Collinsville, East St. Louis, Fairmont City, Fairview Heights, Granite City, Madison, Shiloh, Swansea, Venice, and Washington Park. Democrat Jay Hoffman, who had been a member of the Illinois House of Representatives since January 9, 1991 (with a nine-month interruption in 1997), had represented the district since January 9, 2013. St. Clair County Republican Committee chairman Doug Jameson was the Republican challenger in this election.

Democratic primary
Party	Candidate	Votes	%
Democratic	Jay Hoffman (incumbent)	8,258	100.0
Total votes		8,258	100.0

Republican primary
Party	Candidate	Votes	%
Republican	Doug Jameson	3,331	100.0
Total votes		3,331	100.0

General election
Party	Candidate	Votes	%
Democratic	Jay Hoffman (incumbent)	23,919	62.88
Republican	Doug Jameson	14,118	37.12
Total votes		38,037	100.0
Democratic hold			

=== District 114 ===
The 114th district, located in the Metro East, includes all or parts of Alorton, Belleville, Cahokia, Centreville, East St. Louis, Fairmont City, Fairview Heights, Freeburg, Lebanon, Mascoutah, Millstadt, O'Fallon, Rentchler, Sauget, Scott Air Force Base, Shiloh, Smithton and Washington Park. The district had been represented by Democrat LaToya Greenwood since January 11, 2017. Centreville Township assessor Jason Madlock was the Republican challenger in this election.

Democratic primary
Party	Candidate	Votes	%
Democratic	LaToya Greenwood (incumbent)	8,819	100.0
Total votes		8,819	100.0

Republican primary
Party	Candidate	Votes	%
Republican	Jason Madlock	3,159	100.0
Total votes		3,159	100.0

General election
Party	Candidate	Votes	%
Democratic	LaToya Greenwood (incumbent)	21,530	58.34
Republican	Jason Madlock	15,373	41.66
Total votes		36,903	100.0
Democratic hold			

=== District 115 ===
The 115th district includes all or parts of Alto Pass, Anna, Ashley, Ava, Belle Rive, Bluford, Bonnie, Campbell Hill, Carbondale, Centralia, Cobden, De Soto, Dix, Dongola, Du Bois, Du Quoin, Elkville, Gorham, Grand Tower, Harrison, Ina, Jonesboro, Makanda, Mill Creek, Mount Vernon, Murphysboro, Nashville, Opdyke, Pinckneyville, Radom, Richview, St. Johns, Tamaroa, Vergennes, Waltonville, and Woodlawn. The district had been represented by Republican Terri Bryant since January 14, 2015. Former teacher and Illinois Education Association union leader Marsha Griffin was the Democratic challenger in this election.

Democratic primary
Party	Candidate	Votes	%
Democratic	Marsha Griffin	5,183	63.19
Democratic	Tamiko Mueller	3,019	36.81
Total votes		8,202	100.0

Republican primary
Party	Candidate	Votes	%
Republican	Terri Bryant (incumbent)	4,615	55.38
Republican	Paul Jacobs	3,718	44.62
Total votes		8,333	100.0

General election
Party	Candidate	Votes	%
Republican	Terri Bryant (incumbent)	24,512	58.98
Democratic	Marsha Griffin	17,050	41.02
Total votes		41,562	100.0
Republican hold			

=== District 116 ===
The 116th district, located in parts of the Metro East, includes all or parts of Baldwin, Cahokia, Chester, Columbia, Coulterville, Cutler, Darmstadt, Du Quoin, Dupo, East Carondelet, Ellis Grove, Evansville, Fayetteville, Floraville, Fults, Hecker, Kaskaskia, Lenzburg, Maeystown, Marissa, Millstadt, New Athens, Paderborn, Percy, Pinckneyville, Prairie du Rocher, Red Bud, Rockwood, Ruma, Sauget, Smithton, Sparta, St. Libory, Steeleville, Tilden, Valmeyer, Waterloo, and Willisville. The district had been represented by Democrat Jerry Costello II since January 12, 2011. According to Illinois Election Data, the 116th district was the most Republican district represented by a Democrat during the election. David Friess was the Republican challenger in this year's election.

Democratic primary
Party	Candidate	Votes	%
Democratic	Jerry Costello II (incumbent)	5,091	100.0
Total votes		5,091	100.0

Republican primary
Party	Candidate	Votes	%
Republican	David Friess	5,362	100.0
Total votes		5,362	100.0

General election
Party	Candidate	Votes	%
Democratic	Jerry Costello II (incumbent)	22,429	53.52
Republican	David Friess	19,480	46.48
Total votes		41,909	100.0
Democratic hold			

=== District 117 ===
The 117th district includes all or parts of Benton, Buckner, Bush, Cambria, Carbondale, Carterville, Christopher, Colp, Crab Orchard, Creal Springs, Energy, Ewing, Freeman Spur, Granville, Hanaford, Herrin, Hurst, Johnston City, Macedonia, Marion, McLeansboro, Mulkeytown, North City, Orient, Pittsburg, Royalton, Sesser, Spillertown, Stonefort, Thompsonville, Valier, West City, West Frankfort, Whiteash, and Zeigler. The district had been represented by Republican Dave Severin since January 11, 2017. Jason Woolard, president of the Southern Illinois Central Labor Council for the AFL-CIO, was the Democratic challenger to Severin in this election.

Democratic primary
Party	Candidate	Votes	%
Democratic	Jason Woolard	6,956	100.0
Total votes		6,956	100.0

Republican primary
Party	Candidate	Votes	%
Republican	Dave Severin (incumbent)	6,066	100.0
Total votes		6,066	100.0

General election
Party	Candidate	Votes	%
Republican	Dave Severin (incumbent)	25,046	56.85
Democratic	Jason Woolard	19,007	43.15
Total votes		44,053	100.0
Republican hold			

=== District 118 ===
The 118th district includes all or parts of Anna, Belknap, Belle Prairie City, Brookport, Broughton, Buncombe, Burnside, Cairo, Carbondale, Carrier Mills, Cave-In-Rock, Cypress, Dahlgren, Dongola, East Cape Girardeau, Eddyville, Eldorado, Elizabethtown, Equality, Galatia, Golconda, Goreville, Harrisburg, Joppa, Junction, Karnak, Makanda, Marion, McClure, McLeansboro, Metropolis, Mound City, Mounds, New Grand Chain, New Haven, Old Shawneetown, Olive Branch, Olmsted, Omaha, Pulaski, Raleigh, Ridgway, Rosiclare, Shawneetown, Simpson, Stonefort, Tamms, Thebes, Ullin, and Vienna. The district had been represented by Democrat Brandon Phelps since January 8, 2003. According to Illinois Election Data, the 118th district was the second most Republican district represented by a Democrat during the election. Phelps stepped down, citing health reasons, and was replaced by his cousin Natalie Phelps Finnie. Massac County's state's attorney Patrick Windhorst ran in the election as the Republican challenger.

Democratic primary
Party	Candidate	Votes	%
Democratic	Natalie Phelps Finnie (incumbent)	6,005	100.0
Total votes		6,005	100.0

Republican primary
Party	Candidate	Votes	%
Republican	Patrick Windhorst	5,872	53.79
Republican	Wes Sherrod	2,882	26.40
Republican	Samuel Stratemeyer	2,163	19.81
Total votes		10,917	100.0

General election
Party	Candidate	Votes	%
Republican	Patrick Windhorst	21,956	56.46
Democratic	Natalie Phelps Finnie (incumbent)	16,933	43.54
Total votes		38,889	100.0
Republican gain from Democratic			
