= Rentchler, Illinois =

- Census-designated place
- Location in St. Clair County and the state of Illinois.
- Coordinates: 38°29′29″N 89°52′23″W
- Country: United States
- State: Illinois
- County: St. Clair

Area
  - Total: 0.31 sq mi (0.81 km^{2})
  - Land: 0.31 sq mi (0.81 km^{2})
  - Water: 0 sq mi (0.00 km^{2})
- Elevation: 453 ft (138 m)

Population (2020)
  - Total: 45
  - Density: 144.6/sq mi (55.84/km^{2})
- Time zone: UTC-6 (Central (CST))
  - Summer (DST): UTC-5 (CDT)
- Area code: 618
- GNIS feature ID: 2583442

Rentchler is a census-designated place in St. Clair County, Illinois, United States. As of the 2020 census, Rentchler had a population of 45.

== Demographics ==
Historical population
Census	Pop.	Note	%±
2010	34		—
2020	45		32.4%
U.S. Decennial Census

Rentchler CDP, Illinois – Racial and ethnic composition Note: the US Census treats Hispanic/Latino as an ethnic category. This table excludes Latinos from the racial categories and assigns them to a separate category. Hispanics/Latinos may be of any race.
Race / Ethnicity (NH = Non-Hispanic)	Pop 2010	Pop 2020	% 2010	% 2020
White alone (NH)	30	32	88.24%	71.11%
Black or African American alone (NH)	0	0	0.00%	0.00%
Native American or Alaska Native alone (NH)	0	2	0.00%	4.44%
Asian alone (NH)	0	3	0.00%	6.67%
Native Hawaiian or Pacific Islander alone (NH)	0	0	0.00%	0.00%
Other race alone (NH)	0	2	0.00%	4.44%
Mixed race or Multiracial (NH)	4	5	11.76%	11.11%
Hispanic or Latino (any race)	0	1	0.00%	2.22%
Total	34	45	100.00%	100.00%
