= Longview, Illinois =

Longview
- Village
- Location of Longview in Champaign County, Illinois.

- Location within Champaign County Longview (Illinois)
- Coordinates: 39°53′09″N 88°03′58″W
- Country: United States
- State: Illinois
- County: Champaign

Government
  - Village President: Tyler Clark

Area
  - Total: 0.25 sq mi (0.64 km^{2})
  - Land: 0.25 sq mi (0.64 km^{2})
  - Water: 0 sq mi (0.00 km^{2})
- Elevation: 676 ft (206 m)

Population (2020)
  - Total: 112
  - Density: 453/sq mi (174.9/km^{2})
- Time zone: UTC-6 (CST)
  - Summer (DST): UTC-5 (CDT)
- Zip code: 61852
- Area code: 217
- FIPS code: 17-44602
- GNIS feature ID: 2398473

Longview is a village in Champaign County, Illinois, United States. The population was 112 at the 2020 census.

== Geography ==
According to the 2021 census gazetteer files, Longview has a total area of 0.25 square miles (0.65 km^{2}), all land.

== Demographics ==
Historical population
Census	Pop.	Note	%±
1910	257		—
1920	273		6.2%
1930	291		6.6%
1940	259		−11.0%
1950	239		−7.7%
1960	270		13.0%
1970	224		−17.0%
1980	207		−7.6%
1990	180		−13.0%
2000	153		−15.0%
2010	153		0.0%
2020	112		−26.8%
U.S. Decennial Census

As of the 2020 census there were 112 people, 42 households, and 17 families residing in the village. The population density was 453 inhabitants per square mile (175/km^{2}). There were 64 housing units at an average density of 259 per square mile (100/km^{2}). The racial makeup of the village was 97.32% White, and 2.68% from two or more races. None of the population identified as Hispanic or Latino.

There were 42 households, out of which 23.8% had children under the age of 18 living with them, 23.81% were married couples living together, 9.52% had a female householder with no husband present, and 59.52% were non-families. 38.10% of all households were made up of individuals, and 19.05% had someone living alone who was 65 years of age or older. The average household size was 3.47 and the average family size was 2.36.

The village's age distribution consisted of 19.2% under the age of 18, 8.1% from 18 to 24, 24.3% from 25 to 44, 34.4% from 45 to 64, and 14.1% who were 65 years of age or older. The median age was 44.7 years. For every 100 females, there were 98.0 males. For every 100 females age 18 and over, there were 86.0 males.

The median income for a household in the village was $26,667, and the median income for a family was $43,750. Males had a median income of $41,875 versus $30,625 for females. The per capita income for the village was $24,206. About 35.3% of families and 28.3% of the population were below the poverty line, including 68.4% of those under age 18 and 21.4% of those age 65 or over.

== Education ==
It is in the Heritage Community Unit School District 8.
