= Limestone, Illinois =

- Village
- Location of Limestone in Illinois
- Coordinates: 41°07′56″N 87°58′06″W
- Country: United States
- State: Illinois
- County: Kankakee County
- Township: Limestone Township
- Incorporated: November 2006

Area
  - Total: 2.62 sq mi (6.79 km^{2})
  - Land: 2.62 sq mi (6.79 km^{2})
  - Water: 0 sq mi (0.00 km^{2})
- Elevation: 646 ft (197 m)

Population (2020)
  - Total: 1,558
  - Density: 594.1/sq mi (229.38/km^{2})
- Time zone: UTC-6 (CST)
  - Summer (DST): UTC-5 (CDT)
- ZIP code: 60901
- FIPS code: 17-43510
- GNIS feature ID: 2398440
- Website: www.limestoneil.org

Limestone is a village in Limestone Township, Kankakee County, Illinois, United States. It was incorporated in 2006 and had a population of 1,558 at the 2020 census.

The village is part of the Kankakee–Bradley Metropolitan Statistical Area, which comprises all of Kankakee County.

== Geography ==
Limestone village is in central Kankakee County, 6 miles (10 km) west of Kankakee, the county seat, via Illinois Route 17. According to the 2021 census gazetteer files, Limestone has a total area of 2.62 square miles (6.79 km^{2}), all land.

== Demographics ==
Historical population
Census	Pop.	Note	%±
2010	1,598		—
2020	1,558		−2.5%
U.S. Decennial Census

=== 2020 census ===
As of the 2020 census, Limestone had a population of 1,558, with 500 families residing in the village. The population density was 594.20 inhabitants per square mile (229.42/km^{2}). There were 621 housing units at an average density of 236.84 per square mile (91.44/km^{2}).

The median age was 43.4 years. 22.1% of residents were under the age of 18 and 18.6% were 65 years of age or older. For every 100 females there were 102.6 males, and for every 100 females age 18 and over there were 99.5 males age 18 and over.

42.7% of residents lived in urban areas, while 57.3% lived in rural areas.

There were 604 households, of which 33.4% had children under the age of 18 living in them. Of all households, 58.9% were married-couple households, 15.7% were households with a male householder and no spouse or partner present, and 18.2% were households with a female householder and no spouse or partner present. About 20.9% of all households were made up of individuals and 11.1% had someone living alone who was 65 years of age or older.

Among housing units, 2.7% were vacant. The homeowner vacancy rate was 0.0% and the rental vacancy rate was 5.3%.

Racial composition as of the 2020 census
Race	Number	Percent
White	1,435	92.1%
Black or African American	6	0.4%
American Indian and Alaska Native	3	0.2%
Asian	7	0.4%
Native Hawaiian and Other Pacific Islander	0	0.0%
Some other race	32	2.1%
Two or more races	75	4.8%
Hispanic or Latino (of any race)	68	4.4%

=== Income and poverty ===
The median income for a household in the village was $90,750, and the median income for a family was $104,231. Males had a median income of $61,563 versus $39,583 for females. The per capita income for the village was $44,961. About 3.2% of families and 4.5% of the population were below the poverty line, including 6.4% of those under age 18 and 10.4% of those age 65 or over.
