= Big Shoulders Fund =

The Big Shoulders Fund is a Chicago-based 501(c)(3) nonprofit organization designed to offer financial support for schools with demonstrated needs, which provides a quality, values-based education for Chicago's children. Founded in 1986 by Cardinal Joseph Bernardin and a group of Chicago businessmen, the organization has a Four Star Rating from Charity Navigator and, in 2008 became a member of the FADICA.

== Mission ==
The mission of the Big Shoulders fund is to assist schools with demonstrated needs in the Chicagoland area and Northwest Indiana. The funds raised by Big Shoulders are given to schools to support a variety of educational mediums, including scholarships and enrichment, operational improvements, academic programs, and leadership development.

== Charity ==
In January 2020, The Big Shoulders Fund spent $47.5 million and the archdiocese provided $44.9 million to 30 Catholic schools based mainly on Chicago's western and southern sides.

In June 2020, on Father's Day afflicted by the COVID-19 pandemic, volunteers delivered 10,000 meals through 10 separate locations across Northwest Indiana.

== Statistics ==
Big Shoulders Fund supports the following areas

Schools

- 92 schools in the Chicago region and Northwest Indiana combined
- The schools serve 25,000 students in those areas
- 73% of students identify as Black or Latino
- 65% students reside in low-income households
- 500 teachers in the Big Shoulders Fund talent development pipline
- 10-year, $70 million commitment to 32 of highest-need Big Shoulders Fund Plus Schools

Graduation Rates

- Alumni graduate from college at nearly 2x the national rate, with Black and Latino alumni graduating from college at nearly 3x and 4x the national average.
- 84% of scholars choose to attend a Catholic of selective/quality public school.
- 95% high school graduation rate
- 81% graduating scholars enroll in college

Scholarships

- On average 5,000 students receive Big Shoulders Fund Scholarships each year
- 65 schools adopted by patrons with a personal and financial commitment to build a strategic plan for the future of the schools
