= Darmstadt, Illinois =

- Census-designated place
- Location in St. Clair County and the state of Illinois.
- Coordinates: 38°19′08″N 89°43′44″W
- Country: United States
- State: Illinois
- County: St. Clair

Area
  - Total: 0.073 sq mi (0.19 km^{2})
  - Land: 0.073 sq mi (0.19 km^{2})
  - Water: 0 sq mi (0.00 km^{2})
- Elevation: 430 ft (130 m)

Population (2020)
  - Total: 49
  - Density: 682.5/sq mi (263.51/km^{2})
- Time zone: UTC-6 (Central (CST))
  - Summer (DST): UTC-5 (CDT)
- Area code: 618
- GNIS feature ID: 2583437

Darmstadt is a census-designated place in St. Clair County, Illinois, United States. As of the 2020 census, Darmstadt had a population of 49.

== Demographics ==
Historical population
Census	Pop.	Note	%±
2010	68		—
2020	49		−27.9%
U.S. Decennial Census

Darmstadt CDP, Illinois – Racial and ethnic composition Note: the US Census treats Hispanic/Latino as an ethnic category. This table excludes Latinos from the racial categories and assigns them to a separate category. Hispanics/Latinos may be of any race.
Race / Ethnicity (NH = Non-Hispanic)	Pop 2010	Pop 2020	% 2010	% 2020
White alone (NH)	68	47	100.00%	95.92%
Black or African American alone (NH)	0	1	0.00%	2.04%
Native American or Alaska Native alone (NH)	0	0	0.00%	0.00%
Asian alone (NH)	0	0	0.00%	0.00%
Native Hawaiian or Pacific Islander alone (NH)	0	0	0.00%	0.00%
Other race alone (NH)	0	0	0.00%	0.00%
Mixed race or Multiracial (NH)	0	1	0.00%	2.04%
Hispanic or Latino (any race)	0	0	0.00%	0.00%
Total	68	49	100.00%	100.00%

== History ==
Darmstadt was laid out in 1855. The community was named after Darmstadt, in Germany. A post office called Darmstadt was established in 1864, and remained in operation until it was discontinued in 1907.
