= 2018 Illinois Attorney General election =

- November 6, 2018
- Turnout: 56.16%
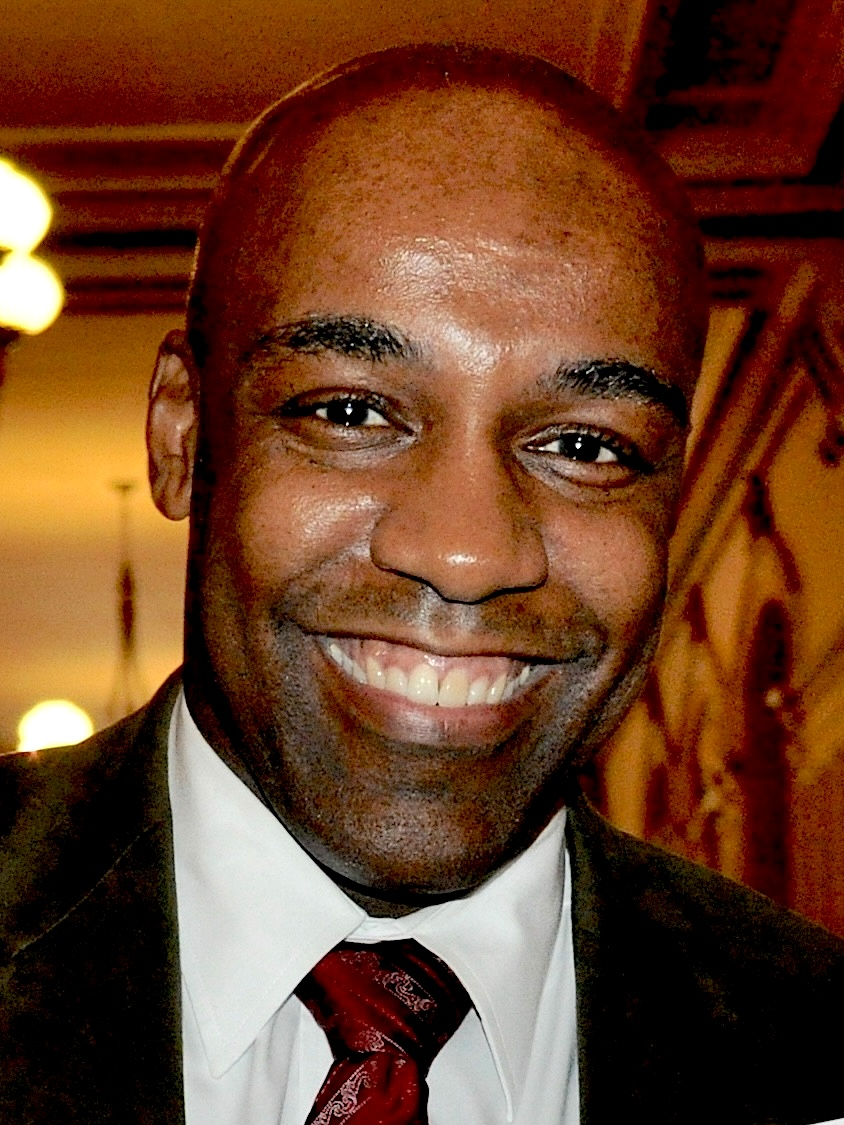

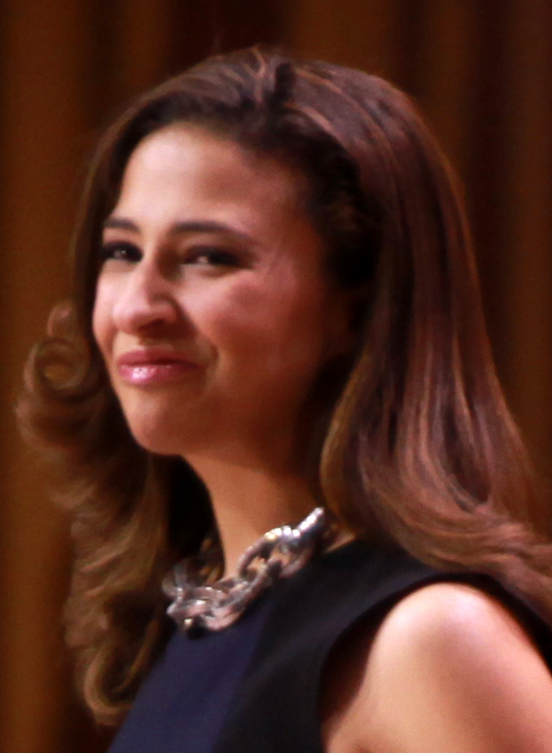
Nominee	Kwame Raoul	Erika Harold
Party	Democratic	Republican
Popular vote	2,488,326	1,944,142
Percentage	54.71%	42.74%
- Raoul: 40–50% 50–60% 60–70% 70–80% 80–90% >90% Harold: 40–50% 50–60% 60–70% 70–80% 80–90% >90% Tie: 40–50% No vote
Attorney General before election
Lisa Madigan
Democratic
Elected Attorney General
Kwame Raoul
Democratic

The 2018 Illinois Attorney General election took place on November 6, 2018, to elect the attorney general of Illinois. Incumbent Democratic Attorney General Lisa Madigan, who had served since 2003, did not seek re-election to a fifth term. Democrat Kwame Raoul won the election with 55 percent of the vote, while Republican Erika Harold took 43 percent of the vote.

== Election information ==
The primaries and general elections coincided with those for federal congressional races and those for other state offices. The election was part of the 2018 Illinois elections.

=== Turnout ===
For the primary elections, turnout was 24.57%, with 1,951,981 votes cast. For the general election, turnout was 56.16%, with 4,548,409 votes cast.

== Democratic primary ==
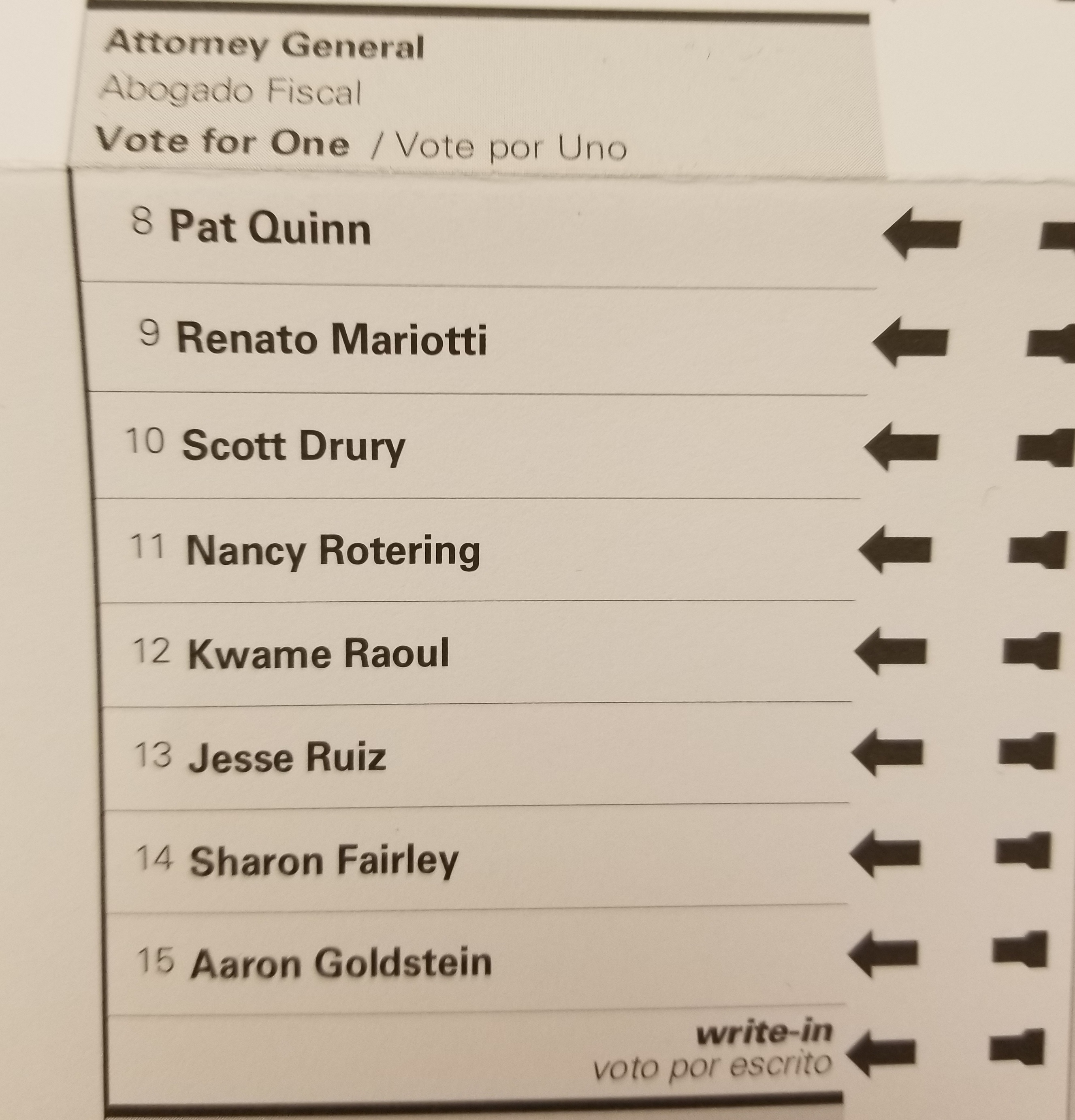
Democratic candidates listed on a blank primary ballot

=== Candidates ===
==== Declared ====
- Scott Drury, state representative
- Sharon Fairley, chief administrator of the Chicago Civilian Office of Police Accountability
- Aaron Goldstein, Democratic committeeman for Chicago's 33rd ward and former defense attorney for Rod Blagojevich
- Renato Mariotti, former federal prosecutor, television legal analyst and commentator
- Pat Quinn, former governor of Illinois (2009–2015) and lieutenant governor of Illinois (2003–2009)
- Kwame Raoul, state senator
- Nancy Rotering, mayor of Highland Park
- Jesse Ruiz, Chicago Park District President and former chairman of the Illinois State Board of Education

==== Declined ====
- Jennifer Burke, former member of the Illinois Pollution Control Board
- Sarah Burke, director of external affairs at Northwestern Memorial Hospital
- Gery Chico, former chairman of the Illinois State Board of Education
- Tom Dart, Cook County sheriff and nominee for Illinois State Treasurer in 2002
- Zach Fardon, former United States Attorney for the Northern District of Illinois
- Kim Foxx, Cook County state's attorney
- Jack D. Franks, chairman of the McHenry County Board
- James Glasgow, Will County state's attorney
- Mike Hastings, state senator
- David Hoffman, former federal prosecutor, former Chicago Inspector General, and candidate for U.S. Senate in 2010
- Dan Hynes, former Illinois comptroller (1999–2011), candidate for U.S. Senate in 2004, and candidate for governor in 2010
- Lori Lightfoot, president of the Chicago Police Board
- Mike McRaith, former director of the Federal Insurance Office
- Elaine Nekritz, assistant majority Leader of the Illinois House of Representatives
- Andrew Schapiro, former United States Ambassador to the Czech Republic
- Ira Silverstein, majority caucus chair of the Illinois Senate.
- Mariyana Spyropoulos, president of the Metropolitan Water Reclamation District
- Chris Welch, state representative
- Ann Williams, state representative
- Andrea Zopp, deputy mayor of Chicago and candidate for U.S. Senate in 2016

=== Endorsements ===
Aaron Goldstein

Organizations

- 39th Ward Democrats
- Illinois Progressive Network
- Kane County Progressives
- Northside Democracy for America
Scott Drury

Individuals

- Rob Warden, founder of the Center on Wrongful Convictions

Newspapers

- The News-Gazette
Sharon Fairley

Organizations

- American Women's Party
- Illinois National Organization for Women (dual endorsement of both Fairley and Rotering)

Newspapers

- Chicago Sun-Times
- Chicago Tribune
- Daily Herald
- The Dispatch/The Dispatch–Argus
- Journal Star
- Rockford Register Star
- The State Journal-Register
Renato Mariotti

U.S. government officials

- Andy Slavitt, former acting administrator of the Centers for Medicare and Medicaid Services

Individuals

- Kirk Acevedo, actor from the HBO series Oz
- Kimberley Johnson, Huffington Post contributor
- Greg Louganis, Olympic gold medalist diver
- Aimee Mann, rock singer-songwriter
- Melissa Jo Peltier, film and TV producer
- Bill Prady, executive producer for The Big Bang Theory
- Tara Strong, voice actress from The Fairly OddParents
Pat Quinn

Organizations

- AMVOTE
Kwame Raoul

U.S. senators

- Roland Burris, former senator

U.S. representatives

- Congressman Danny K. Davis of Illinois's 7th congressional district
- Congresswoman Robin Kelly of Illinois's 2nd congressional district
- Congressman Bobby Rush of Illinois's 1st congressional district

Statewide officials

- Mike Frerichs, state treasurer

State senators

- Dave Koehler

Local officials

- Ameya Pawar, Chicago alderman

Organizations

- 47th Ward Democratic Organization
- AFFI-IAFF
- AFL–CIO
- Chicago Teachers Union
- Cook County Democratic Party
- Illinois Education Association
- Illinois Federation of Teachers
- Independent Voters of Illinois-Independent Precinct Organization
- Kankakee County Democrats
- Madison County Democratic Party
- Service Employees International Union Illinois Council
- St. Clair County Democratic Central Committee
Nancy Rotering

U.S. senators

- Adlai Stevenson III, former senator

U.S. representatives

- Congresswoman Cheri Bustos (D) of Illinois's 17th congressional district
- Congresswoman Jan Schakowsky (D) of Illinois's 9th congressional district

Lt. governors

- Former lt. governor Sheila Simon of Illinois

State representatives

- Former representative Lauren Beth Gash
- Former representative Daniel M. Pierce

Local officials

- Amelia Buragas, Bloomington, Illinois alderman
- Pamela Davidson, Knox County board member (District 3) and Knox County chairwoman
- Eamon Kelley, Evanston Democratic committeeman
- Jackie Traynere, Will County board member

Organizations

- Council for a Livable World
- Illinois National Organization for Women (dual endorsement of both Rotering and Fairley)
- National Women's Political Caucus
Jesse Ruiz

U.S. executive branch officials

- Newton N. Minow, 13th chairman of the Federal Communications Commission (1961–1963)
- Penny Pritzker, 38th United States Secretary of Commerce (2013–2017)

U.S. representatives

- Congressman Luis Gutierrez

State representatives

- Lisa Hernandez, Illinois state representative
- Kathleen Willis, Illinois state representative

Local officials

- George Cardenas, Chicago alderman
- Ricardo Muñoz, Chicago alderman
- Daniel Solis, Chicago alderman

Individuals

- Laura Ricketts, businesswoman and co-owner of the Chicago Cubs
- John Rowe, businessman and former CEO of Exelon
Declined to Endorse in Primary

Organizations

- Democratic Party of Evanston
- Democrats of Northfield Township
- New Trier Democrats
Endorsed All

Organizations

- Personal PAC

=== Polling ===
Poll source	Date(s) administered	Sample size	Margin of error	Kwame Raoul	Pat Quinn	Nancy Rotering	Jesse Ruiz	Renato Mariotti	Sharon Fairley	Aaron Goldstein	Scott Drury	Other	Undecided
Victory Research	March 13–16, 2018	1,204	± 2.8%	24%	26%	6%	4%	3%	8%	4%	10%	–	16%
Capitol Fax/We Ask America	March 7–8, 2018	1,029	± 3.06%	15%	23%	6%	3%	3%	3%	2%	3%	–	43%
Southern Illinois University	February 19–25, 2018	472	± 4.5%	22%	18%	5%	4%	3%	3%	3%	2%	1%	39%

=== Debate ===
2018 Illinois attorney general Democratic primary debate
No.	Date	Host	Moderator	Link	Democratic	Democratic	Democratic	Democratic	Democratic	Democratic	Democratic	Democratic
Key: P Participant A Absent N Not invited I Invited W Withdrawn												
Key: P Participant A Absent N Not invited I Invited W Withdrawn					Scott Drury	Sharon Fairley	Aaron Goldstein	Renato Mariotti	Pat Quinn	Kwame Raoul	Nancy Rotering	Jesse Ruiz
1	January 8, 2018	Democracy for America	Amara Enyia		P	P	P	P	P	P	P	P
2	February 16, 2018	Illinois Democratic County; Chairs Association	Amanda Vinicky		P	P	P	P	P	P	P	P
3	March 4, 2018	Cards Against Humanity; Chicago Sun-Times; Lucy Moog; 2nd Ward Democrats	Justin Kaufmann		P	P	P	P	P	P	P	P
4	March 7, 2018	Better Government Association; WLS-TV		YouTube (Part 1); YouTube (Part 2); YouTube (Part 3); YouTube (Part 4); YouTube (Part 5); YouTube (Part 6)	P	P	P	P	P	P	P	P

=== Results ===
Results by county: Raoul: 20–30%; 30–40%; 40–50%; Quinn: 20–30%; 30–40%; 40–50%; 50–60%; 60–70%; Rotering: 20–30%

Democratic primary results, March 20, 2018
Party	Candidate	Votes	%
Democratic	Kwame Raoul	390,472	30.17%
Democratic	Pat Quinn	352,425	27.23%
Democratic	Sharon Fairley	164,304	12.70%
Democratic	Nancy Rotering	123,446	9.54%
Democratic	Scott Drury	102,193	7.90%
Democratic	Jesse Ruiz	70,158	5.42%
Democratic	Renato Mariotti	51,902	4.01%
Democratic	Aaron Goldstein	39,196	3.03%
Total votes		1,294,096	100.0%

== Republican primary ==
=== Candidates ===
==== Declared ====
- Gary Grasso, DuPage County Board member and former mayor of Burr Ridge
- Erika Harold, former Miss America and candidate for Illinois's 13th congressional district in 2014

==== Declined ====
- Jason Barickman, state senator
- Daniel Cronin, chairman of the DuPage County Board
- Tom Cross, former minority leader of the Illinois House of Representatives and nominee for Illinois State Treasurer in 2014
- Kirk Dillard, former state senator and candidate for governor in 2010 and 2014
- Jim Durkin, minority leader of the Illinois House of Representatives
- Joseph McMahon, Kane County state's attorney

=== Endorsements ===
Erika Harold

U.S. representatives

- Congressman Mike Bost (R-Murphysboro) of Illinois's 12th congressional district
- Congressman Rodney Davis (R-Taylorville) of Illinois's 13th congressional district
- Congressman Randy Hultgren (R-Winfield) of Illinois's 14th congressional district
- Congressman Adam Kinzinger (R-Channahon) of Illinois's 16th congressional district
- Congressman Darin LaHood (R-Dunlap) of Illinois's 18th congressional district
- Congressman John Shimkus (R-Collinsville) of Illinois's 15th congressional district

Illinois state senators

- Republican Caucus Chair Pam Althoff (R-McHenry)
- Senator Jason Barickman (R-Bloomington)
- Senator Tim Bivins (R-Dixon)
- Senator Dale Fowler (R-Harrisburg)
- Senator Kyle McCarter (R-Lebanon)
- Republican Caucus Whip Karen McConnaughay (R-St. Charles)
- Senator Jim Oberweis (R-Sugar Grove)
- Assistant Republican Leader Sue Rezin (R-Morris)
- Senator Dale Righter (R-Mattoon)
- Assistant Republican Leader Chapin Rose (R-Champaign)
- Deputy Republican Leader Dave Syverson (R-Rockford)
- Senator Jil Tracy (R-Mount Sterling)
- Senator Chuck Weaver (R-Peoria)

Illinois state representatives

- Representative Mark Batinick (R-Plainfield)
- Deputy Republican Leader Patricia Bellock (R-Hinsdale)
- Representative Tom Bennett (R-Gibson City)
- Representative Avery Bourne (R-Raymond)
- Representative Terri Bryant (R-Murphysboro)
- Representative Tim Butler (R-Springfield)
- Representative John Cavaletto (R-Salem)
- Representative C. D. Davidsmeyer (R-Jacksonville)
- House Republican Leader Jim Durkin (R-Western Springs)
- Representative Randy Frese (R-Quincy)
- Representative Brad Halbrook (R-Shelbyville)
- Assistant Republican Leader Norine Hammond (R-Emmet Township)
- Assistant Republican Leader Chad Hays (R-Catlin)
- Representative Jeanne Ives (R-Wheaton)
- Assistant Republican Leader Michael McAuliffe (R-Chicago)
- Representative Tony McCombie (R-Savanna)
- Representative Margo McDermed (R-Mokena)
- Representative Charles Meier (R-Okawville)
- Representative Tom Morrison (R-Palatine)
- Representative Lindsay Parkhurst (R-Kankakee)
- Representative Robert Pritchard (R-Hinckley)
- Representative Steve Reick (R-Woodstock)
- Assistant Republican Leader David Reis (R-Effingham)
- Representative Nick Sauer (R-Lake Barrington)
- Representative Dave Severin (R-Benton)
- Representative Allen Skillicorn (R-East Dundee)
- Representative Joe Sosnowski (R-Rockford)
- Representative Ryan Spain (R-Peoria)
- Representative Dan Swanson (R-Woodhull)
- Representative Grant Wehrli (R-Naperville)
- Representative Barbara Wheeler (R-Crystal Lake)
- Representative Keith R. Wheeler (R-Oswego)

Local officeholders

- Kane County state's attorney Joseph McMahon

Organizations

- Maggie's List

Newspapers

- Chicago Sun-Times
- Chicago Tribune
- Daily Herald
- Journal Star
- The News-Gazette
- The State Journal-Register

=== Polling ===
Poll source	Date(s) administered	Sample size	Margin of error	Erika Harold	Gary Grasso	Undecided
Southern Illinois University	February 19–25, 2018	259	± 6.0%	18%	14%	65%

=== Forum ===
2018 Illinois attorney general Republican primary candidate forum
No.	Date	Host	Moderator	Link	Republican	Republican
Key: P Participant A Absent N Not invited I Invited W Withdrawn						
Key: P Participant A Absent N Not invited I Invited W Withdrawn					Gary Grasso	Erika Harold
1	March 7, 2018	Better Government Association; WLS-TV		YouTube (Part 1); YouTube (Part 2); YouTube (Part 3); YouTube (Part 4); YouTube (Part 5)	P	P

=== Results ===
Results by county: Harold: 50–60%; 60–70%; 70–80%; 80–90%; Grasso: 50–60%; Tie: 50–60%

Republican primary results, March 20, 2018
Party	Candidate	Votes	%
Republican	Erika Harold	389,197	59.16%
Republican	Gary Grasso	268,688	40.84%
Total votes		657,885	100.0%

== Third party and independents ==
=== Candidates ===
==== Declared ====
- Bubba Harsy (Libertarian)

==== Declined ====
- Tyson Manker, Iraq War veteran and candidate for Morgan County state's attorney in 2016

== General election ==
=== Predictions ===
Source	Ranking	As of
Governing	Lean D	October 26, 2018

=== Forum ===
2018 Illinois attorney general pre-primary all candidate forum
No.	Date	Host	Moderator	Link	Democratic	Democratic	Democratic	Republican	Republican	Democratic	Democratic	Democratic	Democratic	Democratic
Key: P Participant A Absent N Not invited I Invited W Withdrawn														
Key: P Participant A Absent N Not invited I Invited W Withdrawn					Scott Drury	Sharon Fairley	Aaron Goldstein	Gary Grasso	Erika Harold	Renato Mariotti	Pat Quinn	Kwame Raoul	Nancy Rotering	Jesse Ruiz
1	March 7, 2018	Illinois Campaign for Political Reform; Union League Club of Chicago	Carol Marin		P	P	P	P	P	P	P	P	P	P

=== Endorsements ===
Kwame Raoul (D)

U.S. executive branch officials

- Barack Obama, 44th president of the United States

US senators

- Dick Durbin, U.S. senator (D-IL)
- Kamala Harris, U.S. senator (D-CA)

US representatives

- John Lewis, U.S. representative (GA-5)

Statewide officials

- Susana Mendoza, comptroller of Illinois

County officials

- Kim Foxx Cook County States' Attorney

Local officials

- Chris Kennedy, former chair of the University of Illinois Board of Trustees and former candidate for governor

Organizations

- Equality Illinois Action PAC
- Gun Violence Prevention PAC
- Illinois Alliance for Retired Americans
- Illinois National Organization for Women
- Independent Voters of Illinois-Independent Precinct Organization
- Planned Parenthood Illinois Action PAC
- The Sierra Club Illinois Chapter

Newspapers

- The Chicago Sun-Times
- The Daily Herald
- The St. Louis American
Erika Harold (R)

Organizations

- Illinois Chamber of Commerce
- National Federation of Independent Business

Newspapers

- Chicago Tribune
- Dispatch-Argus
- Journal Star
- The News-Gazette
- Rockford Register Star

=== Polling ===
Poll source	Date(s) administered	Sample size	Margin of error	Kwame Raoul (D)	Erika Harold (R)	Bubba Harsy (L)	Undecided
Victory Research	September 27 – October 2, 2018	1,208	± 2.8%	44%	33%	5%	18%
Southern Illinois University	September 24–29, 2018	715	± 3.7%	36%	26%	–	39%
Research America Inc.	September 5–13, 2018	1,024	± 3.1%	43%	32%	–	25% (Note: "Don't know" with 21%; "None" with 4%)
We Ask America	June 9–11, 2018	600	± 4.0%	44%	35%	–	21%

=== Results ===
2018 Illinois attorney general election
Party	Candidate	Votes	%	±%
Democratic	Kwame Raoul	2,488,326	54.71%	−4.75%
Republican	Erika Harold	1,944,142	42.74%	+4.97%
Libertarian	Bubba Harsy	115,941	2.55%	−0.22%
Total votes		4,548,409	100.0%	N/A
Democratic hold				

==== By congressional district ====
Raoul won 10 of 18 congressional districts, with the remaining 8 going to Harold, including three that elected Democrats.

District	Raoul	Harold	Representative
1st	74%	24%	Bobby Rush
2nd	77%	21%	Robin Kelly
3rd	55%	42%	Dan Lipinski
4th	80%	18%	Chuy García
5th	68%	30%	Mike Quigley
6th	47%	50%	Sean Casten
7th	83%	15%	Danny Davis
8th	56%	41%	Raja Krishnamoorthi
9th	66%	31%	Jan Schakowsky
10th	58%	40%	Brad Schneider
11th	57%	40%	Bill Foster
12th	43%	53%	Mike Bost
13th	44%	53%	Rodney Davis
14th	45%	52%	Lauren Underwood
15th	26%	71%	John Shimkus
16th	39%	58%	Adam Kinzinger
17th	47%	50%	Cheri Bustos
18th	32%	65%	Darin LaHood

== See also ==
- 2018 Illinois elections
