= 2018 Illinois elections =

- November 6, 2018
- Turnout: 57.23%

A general election was held in the U.S. state of Illinois on November 6, 2018. The elections for Illinois's 18 congressional districts, governor, statewide constitutional officers, Illinois Senate, and Illinois House were held on this date.

Primaries were held March 20, 2018.

The Democratic Party made gains, including picking up the state's governorship and flipping two of its U.S. House seats. After the election, all executive offices and control of the Illinois General Assembly was held by the Democratic Party. Conversely the Republican Party experienced what was regarded to be their worst defeat in the state since at least 2006.

== Election information ==
2018 was a midterm election year in the United States.

=== Turnout ===
==== Primary election ====
For the primary election, turnout was 26.48%, with 2,103,634 votes cast.

Turnout by county

County	Registration	Votes cast	Turnout
Adams	47,422	6,670	14.07%
Alexander	5,303	1,691	31.89%
Bond	10,978	2,854	26%
Boone	32,552	7,525	23.12%
Brown	3,337	662	19.84%
Bureau	23,661	7,446	31.47%
Calhoun	3,542	905	25.55%
Carroll	10,449	3,329	31.86%
Cass	7,704	1,819	23.61%
Champaign	119,979	31,574	26.32%
Christian	20,925	4,294	20.52%
Clark	11,886	4,826	40.6%
Clay	8,809	2,935	33.32%
Clinton	24,486	5,462	22.31%
Coles	29,515	9,238	31.3%
Cook (Note: For more on Cook County primary turnout, see 2018 Cook County, Illinois elections#Voter turnout)	3,043,887	938,639	30.84%
Crawford	12,328	4,239	34.39%
Cumberland	7,636	3,030	39.68%
DeKalb	56,946	14,531	25.52%
DeWitt	10,885	2,773	25.48%
Douglas	11,564	3,816	33%
DuPage	633,638	157,671	24.88%
Edgar	11,968	2,077	17.35%
Edwards	4,342	1,779	40.97%
Effingham	23,564	6,023	25.56%
Fayette	13,572	3,218	23.71%
Ford	8,664	2,336	26.96%
Franklin	28,534	5,380	18.85%
Fulton	25,423	5,349	21.04%
Gallatin	3,765	1,327	35.25%
Greene	8,891	1,922	21.62%
Grundy	33,916	8,070	23.79%
Hamilton	5,643	1,631	28.9%
Hancock	12,244	2,562	20.92%
Hardin	3,176	900	28.34%
Henderson	4,847	1,278	26.37%
Henry	35,896	7,645	21.3%
Iroquois	17,933	4,696	26.19%
Jackson	31,777	8,683	27.32%
Jasper	6,859	2,314	33.74%
Jefferson	23,547	5,680	24.12%
Jersey	15,188	3,073	20.23%
Jo Daviess	15,938	3,708	23.27%
Johnson	8,834	2,448	27.71%
Kane	305,679	65,419	21.4%
Kankakee	67,383	11,976	17.77%
Kendall	72,920	15,883	21.78%
Knox	32,995	6,517	19.75%
Lake	439,860	98,944	22.49%
LaSalle	69,838	16,185	23.18%
Lawrence	8,737	1,546	17.69%
Lee	22,216	6,147	27.67%
Livingston	21,221	6,776	31.93%
Logan	18,163	5,688	31.32%
Macon	74,132	16,732	22.57%
Macoupin	32,632	6,727	20.61%
Madison	174,508	43,928	25.17%
Marion	24,318	4,642	19.09%
Marshall	8,253	2,892	35.04%
Mason	9,040	2,007	22.2%
Massac	10,484	3,183	30.36%
McDonough	18,905	6,078	32.15%
McHenry	223,579	48,504	21.69%
McLean	108,708	28,516	26.23%
Menard	9,089	3,061	33.68%
Mercer	12,125	2,352	19.4%
Monroe	25,313	4,012	15.85%
Montgomery	15,873	5,521	34.78%
Morgan	21,747	6,244	28.71%
Moultrie	8,548	2,918	34.14%
Ogle	30,493	8,468	27.77%
Peoria	113,911	23,250	20.41%
Perry	14,561	2,901	19.92%
Piatt	12,091	5,378	44.48%
Pike	10,266	2,548	24.82%
Pope	2,989	823	27.53%
Pulaski	4,395	1,252	28.49%
Putnam	4,269	1,181	27.66%
Randolph	21,563	3,680	17.07%
Richland	11,517	4,318	37.49%
Rock Island	86,055	17,265	20.06%
Saline	16,361	4,578	27.98%
Sangamon	131,964	31,047	23.53%
Schuyler	5,362	1,350	25.18%
Scott	3,615	1,411	39.03%
Shelby	14,595	4,038	27.67%
Stark	4,100	1,510	36.83%
St. Clair	190,018	35,514	18.69%
Stephenson	34,036	8,488	24.94%
Tazewell	89,252	24,919	27.92%
Union	11,849	3,196	26.97%
Vermilion	45,711	9,999	21.87%
Wabash	8,459	2,110	24.94%
Warren	11,616	2,288	19.7%
Washington	9,601	2,944	30.66%
Wayne	12,193	3,878	31.81%
White	10,218	2,557	25.02%
Whiteside	37,379	8,995	24.06%
Will	431,906	95,945	22.21%
Williamson	44,661	9,572	21.43%
Winnebago	176,057	49,517	28.13%
Woodford	25,792	8,288	32.13%
Total	7,945,074	2,103,634	26.48%

==== General election ====
For the general election, turnout was 57.23%, with 4,635,541 votes cast. The Illinois State Board of Elections reported that this general election turnout rate was the third-highest for a midterm election over the past forty years. The Illinois State Board of Elections also reported that the total number of votes cast set a record high. Voter registration, at 8.1 million, also sat at a record high.

Turnout was considered high in the United States during the 2018 midterm elections, with it being the highest national midterm turnout since 1914.

Turnout by county

County	Registration	Votes cast	Turnout%
Adams	47,811	24,611	51.48%
Alexander	5,354	2,278	42.55%
Bond	11,197	6,723	60.04%
Boone	33,054	18,176	54.99%
Brown	3,509	1,934	55.12%
Bureau	23,847	13,840	58.04%
Calhoun	3,559	2,377	66.79%
Carroll	10,682	6,039	56.53%
Cass	7,774	4,683	60.24%
Champaign	124,057	80,112	64.58%
Christian	21,209	13,027	61.42%
Clark	11,936	6,249	52.35%
Clay	8,948	4,956	55.39%
Clinton	24,810	14,269	57.51%
Coles	30,551	17,385	56.9%
Cook (Note: For more on Cook County general election turnout, see 2018 Cook County, Illinois elections#Voter turnout)	3,090,800	1,795,518	58.09%
Crawford	12,624	7,022	55.62%
Cumberland	7,712	4,400	57.05%
DeKalb	60,754	36,610	60.26%
DeWitt	11,083	6,286	56.72%
Douglas	11,701	6,499	55.54%
DuPage	639,752	370,249	57.87%
Edgar	12,106	6,264	51.74%
Edwards	4,406	2,468	56.01%
Effingham	23,873	14,621	61.24%
Fayette	13,474	8,011	59.46%
Ford	8,803	5,061	57.49%
Franklin	28,743	15,632	54.39%
Fulton	25,576	12,727	49.76%
Gallatin	3,720	2,205	59.27%
Greene	8,946	4,441	49.64%
Grundy	33,041	19,646	59.46%
Hamilton	5,666	3,677	64.9%
Hancock	12,431	7,143	57.46%
Hardin	2,980	1,774	59.53%
Henderson	4,836	2,736	56.58%
Henry	34,493	19,694	57.1%
Iroquois	17,968	10,388	57.81%
Jackson	39,503	20,693	52.38%
Jasper	6,882	4,577	66.51%
Jefferson	24,002	14,264	59.43%
Jersey	15,544	8,905	57.29%
Jo Daviess	16,164	9,414	58.24%
Johnson	8,879	5,343	60.18%
Kane	314,170	172,056	54.77%
Kankakee	68,513	37,012	54.02%
Kendall	78,788	45,534	57.79%
Knox	33,475	18,125	54.14%
Lake	448,295	254,217	56.71%
LaSalle	71,111	40,691	57.22%
Lawrence	8,830	4,410	49.94%
Lee	22,496	12,742	56.64%
Livingston	21,591	12,261	56.79%
Logan	18,396	10,246	55.7%
Macon	75,161	39,738	52.87%
Macoupin	32,151	18,458	57.41%
Madison	180,511	105,432	58.41%
Marion	24,747	12,786	51.67%
Marshall	8,303	4,783	57.61%
Mason	9,112	5,334	58.54%
Massac	10,650	5,507	51.71%
McDonough	18,464	10,368	56.15%
McHenry	235,593	117,838	50.02%
McLean	109,316	68,087	62.28%
Menard	9,172	5,519	60.17%
Mercer	12,357	7,130	57.7%
Monroe	26,035	15,754	60.51%
Montgomery	16,338	11,721	71.74%
Morgan	22,026	11,870	53.89%
Moultrie	8,547	5,226	61.14%
Ogle	32,316	19,267	59.62%
Peoria	117,449	65,865	56.08%
Perry	14,475	8,672	59.91%
Piatt	12,141	7,730	63.67%
Pike	10,433	6,693	64.15%
Pope	3,004	1,813	60.35%
Pulaski	4,434	2,488	56.11%
Putnam	4,289	2,645	61.67%
Randolph	21,517	12,464	57.93%
Richland	11,599	6,192	53.38%
Rock Island	100,163	51,283	51.2%
Saline	16,441	9,773	59.44%
Sangamon	135,830	87,193	64.19%
Schuyler	5,293	3,176	60%
Scott	3,470	2,098	60.46%
Shelby	14,878	9,399	63.17%
Stark	4,093	2,099	51.28%
St. Clair	192,407	99,849	51.89%
Stephenson	34,461	16,612	48.21%
Tazewell	90,595	52,368	57.8%
Union	12,098	7,693	63.59%
Vermilion	49,519	23,559	47.58%
Wabash	8,004	4,056	50.67%
Warren	11,612	6,177	53.19%
Washington	9,777	6,205	63.47%
Wayne	12,118	6,065	50.05%
White	10,300	6,006	58.31%
Whiteside	37,945	21,723	57.25%
Will	429,647	249,682	58.11%
Williamson	45,987	27,752	60.35%
Winnebago	177,945	96,765	54.38%
Woodford	26,224	16,407	62.56%
Total	8,099,372	4,635,541	57.23%

== Federal elections ==
=== United States House ===
All of Illinois' 18 seats in the United States House of Representatives were up for election in 2018.

The Democratic Party flipped two Republican-held seats, making the composition of Illinois' House delegation 13 Democrats and five Republicans.

== Governor and lieutenant governor ==
Incumbent Republican Governor Bruce Rauner ran for re-election to a second term, but was defeated by Democratic venture capitalist and billionaire J. B. Pritzker.

=== Democratic primary ===
Democratic primary results
Party	Candidate	Votes	%
Democratic	JB Pritzker	597,756	45.1
Democratic	Daniel Biss	353,625	26.7
Democratic	Chris Kennedy	322,730	24.4
Democratic	Tio Hardiman	21,075	1.6
Democratic	Bob Daiber	15,009	1.1
Democratic	Robert Marshall	14,353	1.1
Total votes		1,324,548	100.0

=== Republican primary ===
Republican primary results
Party	Candidate	Votes	%
Republican	Bruce Rauner (incumbent)	372,124	51.5
Republican	Jeanne Ives	350,038	48.5
Total votes		722,162	100.0

=== General election ===
Illinois gubernatorial election, 2018
Party	Candidate	Votes	%
Democratic	JB Pritzker/Juliana Stratton	2,479,746	54.5
Republican	Bruce Rauner/Evelyn Sanguinetti (incumbent)	1,765,751	38.8
Conservative	Sam McCann/Aaron Merreighn	192,527	4.2
Libertarian	Kash Jackson/Sanj Mohip	109,518	2.4
Write-in		115	0.0
Total votes		4,547,657	100.0
Democratic gain from Republican			

== Attorney general ==
Incumbent Democratic attorney general Lisa Madigan, who had served since 2003, chose not to run for re-election to a fifth term. Democratic state Senator Kwame Raoul defeated Republican Erika Harold.

=== Democratic primary ===
Democratic primary results
Party	Candidate	Votes	%
Democratic	Kwame Raoul	390,472	30.2
Democratic	Pat Quinn	352,425	27.2
Democratic	Sharon Fairley	164,304	12.7
Democratic	Nancy Rotering	123,446	9.5
Democratic	Scott Drury	102,193	7.9
Democratic	Jesse Ruiz	70,158	5.4
Democratic	Renato Mariotti	51,902	4.0
Democratic	Aaron Goldstein	39,196	3.0
Total votes		1,294,096	100.0

=== Republican primary ===
Republican primary results
Party	Candidate	Votes	%
Republican	Erika Harold	389,197	59.2
Republican	Gary Grasso	268,688	40.8
Total votes		657,885	100.0

=== General election ===
Illinois Attorney General election, 2018
Party	Candidate	Votes	%
Democratic	Kwame Raoul	2,488,326	54.7
Republican	Erika Harold	1,944,142	42.7
Libertarian	Bubba Harsy	115,941	2.6
Total votes		4,548,409	100.0
Democratic hold			

== Secretary of state ==
Incumbent Democratic secretary of state Jesse White, who had been in office since 1999, initially announced in August 2015 that he would retire. On August 17, 2017, White reversed this decision and announced that he would run for re-election to a sixth term. Governing magazine projected the race as "safe Democratic".

=== Democratic primary ===
Democratic primary results
Party	Candidate	Votes	%
Democratic	Jesse White (incumbent)	1,209,978	100.0
Total votes		1,209,978	100.0

=== Republican primary ===
Republican primary results
Party	Candidate	Votes	%
Republican	Jason Helland	609,190	100.0
Total votes		609,190	100.0

=== General election ===
Illinois Secretary of State election, 2018
Party	Candidate	Votes	%	±%
Democratic	Jesse White (incumbent)	3,120,207	68.26%	+2.56%
Republican	Jason Helland	1,336,079	29.23%	−2.16%
Libertarian	Steve Dutner	114,556	2.51%	−0.38%
Total votes		4,570,842	100.0%	
Democratic hold				

== Comptroller ==
Illinois Comptroller election, 2018
- November 6, 2018
- Turnout: 56.00%
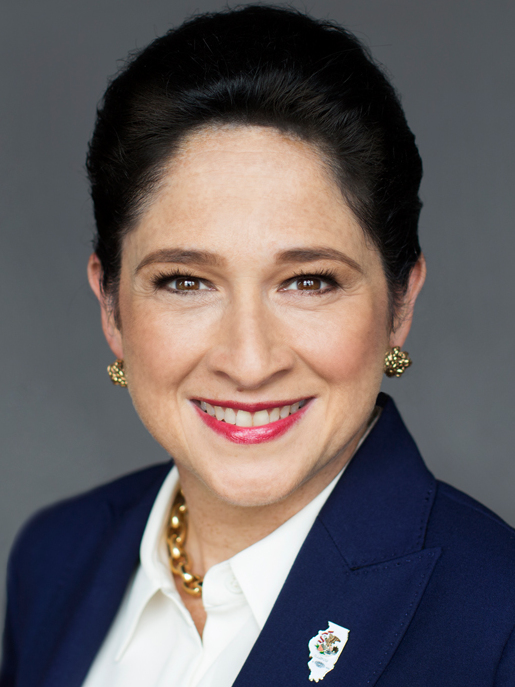

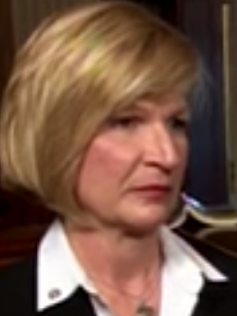
Nominee	Susana Mendoza	Darlene Senger
Party	Democratic	Republican
Popular vote	2,716,853	1,678,346
Percentage	59.9%	37.0%
- Mendoza: 40–50% 50–60% 60–70% 70–80% 80–90% >90% Senger: 40–50% 50–60% 60–70% 70–80% 80–90% >90% Tie: 40–50%
Comptroller before election
Susana Mendoza
Democratic
Elected Comptroller
Susana Mendoza
Democratic

Incumbent Republican Judy Baar Topinka died on December 10, 2014, after being re-elected to a second term in office. A special election was held in 2016 for the remainder of the term, with Democratic City Clerk of Chicago Susana Mendoza defeating appointed Republican Comptroller Leslie Munger. Mendoza won a full term.

=== Democratic primary ===
==== Candidates ====
===== Declared =====
- Susana Mendoza, incumbent Illinois Comptroller

==== Results ====
Democratic primary results
Party	Candidate	Votes	%
Democratic	Susana Mendoza (incumbent)	1,147,095	100.0
Total votes		1,147,095	100.0

=== Republican primary ===
==== Candidates ====
===== Declared =====
- Darlene Senger, former state representative and nominee for Illinois's 11th congressional district in 2014

==== Results ====
Republican primary results
Party	Candidate	Votes	%
Republican	Darlene Senger	607,187	100.0
Total votes		607,187	100.0

=== Third parties and independents ===
==== Candidates ====
===== Declared =====
- Claire Ball (Libertarian), certified public accountant

=== General election ===
==== Results ====
Illinois State Comptroller election, 2018
Party	Candidate	Votes	%	±%
Democratic	Susana Mendoza (incumbent)	2,716,853	59.90%	+10.45%
Republican	Darlene Senger	1,678,346	37.00%	−7.43%
Libertarian	Claire Ball	140,543	3.10%	−0.36%
Write-in		17	0.00%	N/A
Total votes		4,535,759	100.0%	
Democratic hold				

== Treasurer ==
Illinois Treasurer election, 2018
- November 6, 2018
- Turnout: 55.56%
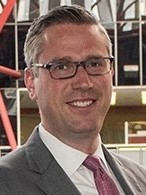

Nominee	Mike Frerichs	Jim Dodge
Party	Democratic	Republican
Popular vote	2,593,816	1,750,897
Percentage	57.6%	38.9%
- Frerichs: 40–50% 50–60% 60–70% 70–80% 80–90% >90% Dodge: 40–50% 50–60% 60–70% 70–80% 80–90% >90% Tie: 40–50%
Treasurer before election
Mike Frerichs
Democratic
Elected Treasurer
Mike Frerichs
Democratic

=== Democratic primary ===
==== Candidates ====
===== Declared =====
- Mike Frerichs, incumbent state treasurer

==== Results ====
Democratic primary results
Party	Candidate	Votes	%
Democratic	Mike Frerichs (incumbent)	1,087,950	100.0
Total votes		1,087,950	100.0

=== Republican primary ===
==== Candidates ====
===== Declared =====
- Jim Dodge, Orland Park Village trustee and candidate for Illinois Comptroller in 2010

==== Results ====
Republican primary results
Party	Candidate	Votes	%
Republican	Jim Dodge	602,626	100.0
Total votes		602,626	100.0

=== General election ===
==== Results ====
Illinois State Treasurer election, 2018
Party	Candidate	Votes	%	±%
Democratic	Mike Frerichs (incumbent)	2,593,816	57.64%	+9.59%
Republican	Jim Dodge	1,750,897	38.91%	−8.88%
Libertarian	Mike Leheney	155,256	3.45%	−0.71%
Write-in		2	0.0%	N/A
Total votes		4,499,971	100.0%	
Democratic hold				

== State senate ==
One-third of the seats of the Illinois Senate were up for election in 2018.

== State House of Representatives ==
All of the seats in the Illinois House of Representatives were up for election in 2018.

== Judicial elections ==
Judicial elections were held, consisting of both partisan and retention elections, including those for one seat in the Supreme Court of Illinois and five seats in the Illinois Appellate Court.

== Local elections ==
Local elections took place, including county elections such as the Cook County elections.
