= Steve Reick =

American politician

Steven Reick
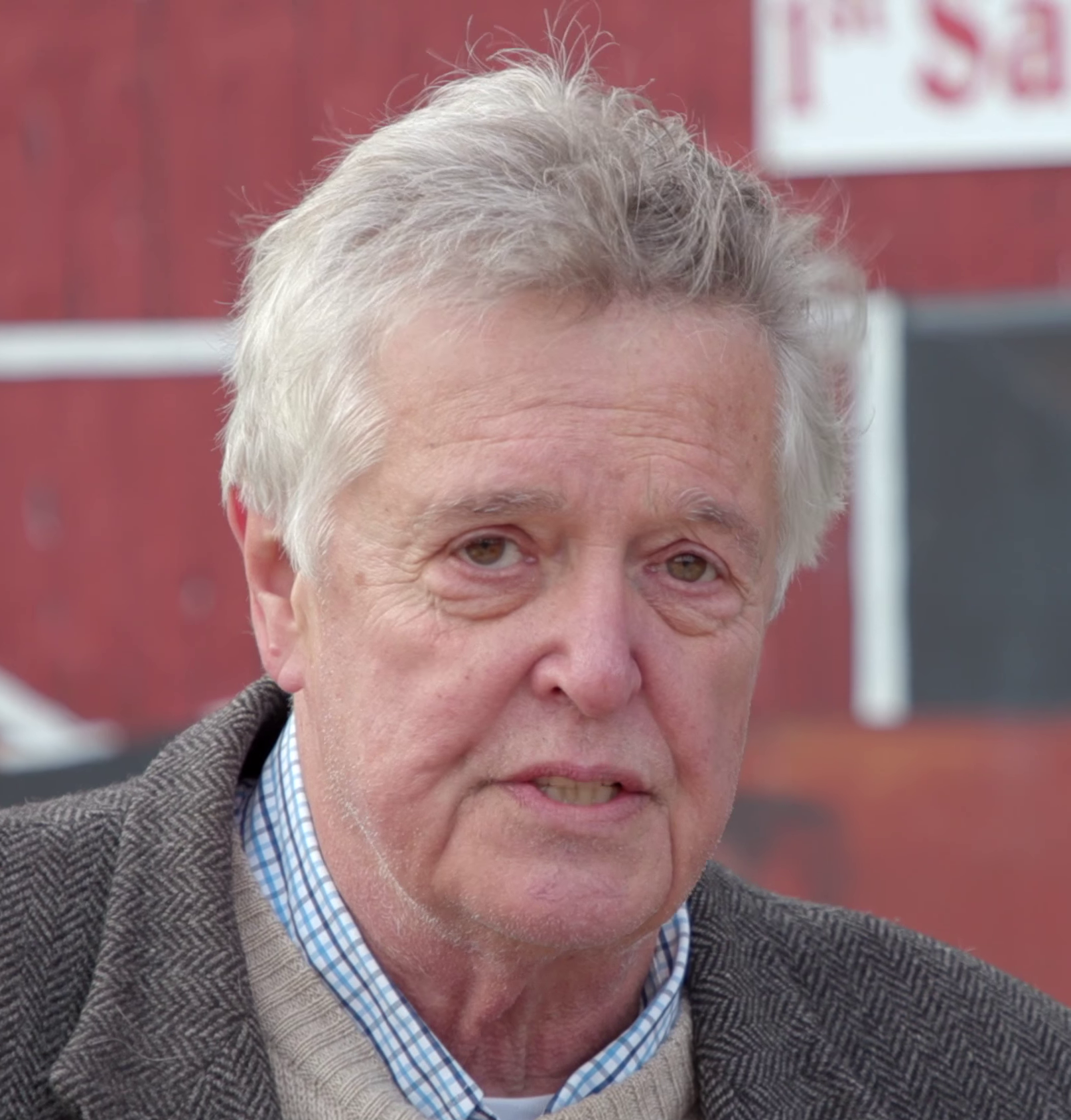

Member of the Illinois House of Representatives from the 63rd district
- Incumbent
- Assumed office January 11, 2017
- Preceded by: Jack D. Franks

Personal details
- Party: Republican
- Spouse: Deb
- Children: 3
- Education: University of Illinois; University of Georgia
- Profession: Tax attorney

Steven "Steve" Reick (/raɪk/ RYKE) is an American politician. He is currently a member of the Illinois House of Representatives, representing the 63rd district since January 2017. The district, located in the McHenry area, includes all or parts of Harvard, Marengo, Woodstock, Bull Valley, Wonder Lake, Illinois, Greenwood, McHenry, Fox Lake, Spring Grove, Johnsburg and Lakemoor.

== Early life and education ==
Reick was born and raised in Kankakee, Illinois, graduating from Herscher High School in 1971. Being the first person in his family to attend college, he graduated from University of Illinois in 1975 with a bachelor's degree in Accountancy and went on to earn a Juris Doctor and a master's degree in Accountancy and Taxation from the University of Georgia in 1980.

== Career ==
Reick is a self-employed tax attorney. He began his profession in 1982, when he and his wife moved to Woodstock, Illinois.

=== Illinois House of Representatives ===
Reick unsuccessfully ran for State Representative in 2014, losing to incumbent Democrat Jack D. Franks. Reick won 41.46% of the vote to Franks' 58.54%.

Reick ran again in 2016. Reick won the Republican primary and was set to face Franks again. Franks dropped out of the race in May to run for McHenry County Board Chairman, being replaced with John Bartman. Reick won the November 8 general election with 56.5% of the vote. He took office on January 11, 2017.

As of July 2022, Reick is a member of the following Illinois House committees:

- Appropriations - Elementary & Secondary Education Committee (HAPE)
- Elementary & Secondary Education: School Curriculum & Policies Committee (HELM)
- Labor & Commerce Committee (HLBR)
- Revenue & Finance Committee (HREF)
- Wage Policy & Study Subcommittee (HLBR-WAGE)

== Electoral history ==
Illinois 63rd Representative District General Election, 2020
Party	Candidate	Votes	%	±%
Republican	Steven Reick (incumbent)	28,320	54.77	−45.23%
Democratic	Brian Sager	23,390	45.23	N/A
Total votes		51,710	100.0	

Illinois 63rd Representative District General Election, 2018
Party	Candidate	Votes	%	±%
Republican	Steven Reick (incumbent)	26,121	100.0	+43.53%
Total votes		26,121	100.0	

Illinois 63rd Representative District General Election, 2016
Party	Candidate	Votes	%
Republican	Steven Reick	25,699	56.47
Democratic	John M. Bartman	19,808	43.53
Total votes		45,507	100.0

Illinois 63rd Representative District Republican Primary, 2016
Party	Candidate	Votes	%
Republican	Steven Reick	8,829	59.31
Republican	Jeffery Lichte	6,057	40.69
Total votes		14,886	100.0

== Personal life ==
Reick is married to his wife Deb, and together they have three children and four grandchildren. Reick lives in Woodstock, Illinois.

In May 2019, Reick was arrested and charged with driving under the influence.
