= Jack D. Franks =

American politician

Jack Franks

Chairman of the McHenry County Board
- In office December 5, 2016 – December 8, 2020
- Preceded by: Joseph Gottemoller (appointed)
- Succeeded by: Mike Buehler

Member of the Illinois House of Representatives from the 63rd district
- In office January 1999 – January 11, 2017
- Preceded by: Michael J. Brown
- Succeeded by: Steve Reick

Personal details
- Born: Jack Darrow Franks; October 2, 1963 (age 63) Belvidere, Illinois
- Party: Democratic
- Education: University of Wisconsin; Washington College of Law
- Profession: Attorney, politician

Jack Darrow Franks (born October 2, 1963) is an Illinois attorney and politician who served as Chairman of the McHenry County Board from December 2016 to December 2020. Previously, Franks served as a member of the Illinois House of Representatives, representing the 63rd district from 1999 to 2017. His McHenry area district included all or parts of Harvard, Marengo, Woodstock, Bull Valley, Wonder Lake, Illinois, Greenwood, McHenry, Fox Lake, Spring Grove, Johnsburg and Lakemoor.

While in the Illinois House of Representatives, Franks served as chairman of the State Government Administration, beginning in 2003.

== Illinois House of Representatives ==
Franks was first elected to the Illinois House of Representatives in 1998 defeating the incumbent by 138 votes to become one of the first Democrats to represent the largely Republican McHenry area in the Illinois General Assembly.

When Franks initially ran for office, he pledged to serve only three terms, however he broke his term limit promise and ultimately served nine terms.

As chair of the State Government Administration Committee, Franks called for the first audits of a sitting governor in the history of Illinois and was the first Democrat to openly criticize Rod Blagojevich. Blagojevich's team questioned Franks' integrity and whether his impeachment hearing request was politically motivated. The governor's office released a 2003 memo in which Franks requested patronage hires for family and friends.

At one point during his tenure, Franks served on the Illinois Aging Committee, Public Utilities Committee, chairman of the State Government Administration Committee, chairman of the International Trade & Commerce Committee, and vice-chairman of the Veterans' Affairs Committee.

=== Notable votes ===
Franks and a fellow Democrat, Representative Scott Drury, voted against a plan to tax people with seven-figure incomes, called by some a "millionaire's tax", along with every Republican lawmaker, leaving the Democrats two votes shy of the 71 they need to move it forward.

Franks voted "present" on a labor vote in the House, where Democrats were attempting to override a veto by Governor Bruce Rauner on SB 1229, which would have empowered an arbitrator to settle negotiation disputes between public sector unions and the governor and would have impeded the governor's ability to force a "lock-out" of state workers during contract negotiations. The House failed to override the governor's veto by three votes.

== McHenry County board chairman ==
On May 15, 2016, Franks announced he would run for McHenry County Board Chairman in its first popularly held election for the position. Previously, in June 2014, Franks specifically stated he would not run for the position in 2016. On the November 8 general election, Franks defeated Republican county board member Michael Walkup with over 57 percent of the vote, according to unofficial results. Franks was sworn in on December 5, 2016 along with the other County Board members.

Franks lost the November 2020 general election to Republican Mike Buehler. Franks left office on December 8, 2020.

== Other ==
Franks is a practicing attorney at the law firm of Franks, Gerkin & McKenna. He holds two degrees: a Bachelor of Arts Degree in Political Science from the University of Wisconsin–Madison and a law degree from the American University Washington College of Law. He is a member of multiple chambers of commerce in the McHenry County area. Franks and his wife, Debby, have two children. In January 2020, it was reported that the Illinois State Police were investigating Franks for allegations of sexual misconduct and stalking.
