= Janet Yang Rohr =

American politician

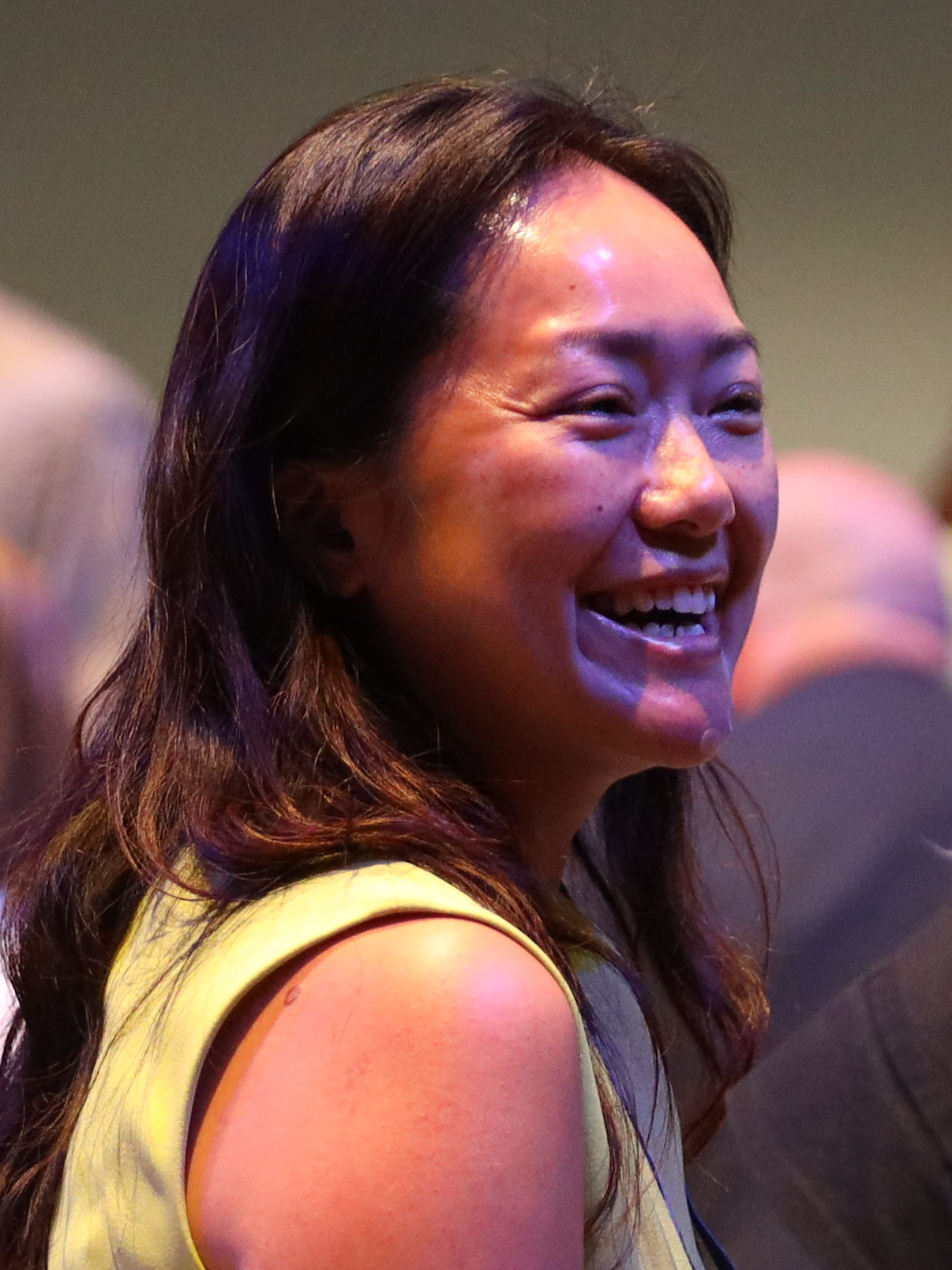
- Yang Rohr in 2025

Member of the Illinois House of Representatives from the 41st district
- Incumbent
- Assumed office January 13, 2021
- Preceded by: Grant Wehrli

Personal details
- Party: Democratic
- Children: 3
- Education: Northwestern University (B.A.); University of Chicago Booth School of Business (MBA)
- Occupation: Director of Global Data
- Website: Official site

Janet Yang Rohr, is an American politician, representing the 41st District, serving Naperville, Warrenville, and Bolingbrook, in the Illinois House of Representatives. She began her first term in January 2021 as a part of the 102nd General Assembly.

== Early life and education ==
A daughter of Taiwanese immigrants, Yang Rohr is a life-long resident of Naperville, Illinois. She attended Ranch View Elementary School, Kennedy Junior High School, and Naperville North High School. She earned a Bachelor of Arts degree in English and Economics from Northwestern University and she earned her Master of Business Administration in Finance, Accounting, and Entrepreneurship at University of Chicago Booth School of Business.

== Career ==
Yang Rohr served as a school board member for Naperville Community Unit School District 203 schools from 2017 to 2021. She is the head of Managed Investment Data at Morningstar, Inc. Yang Rohr holds the Chartered Financial Analyst designation and has been widely quoted for her investment expertise.

== Electoral history ==
Illinois 41st State House District Democratic Primary, 2020
Party	Candidate	Votes	%
Democratic	Janet Yang Rohr	10,246	70.13
Democratic	Denika McMillen	4,364	29.87
Total votes		14,610	100.0

Illinois 41st State House District General Election, 2020
Party	Candidate	Votes	%
Democratic	Janet Yang Rohr	31,613	51.68
Republican	Grant Wehrli (incumbent)	29,558	48.32
Total votes		61,171	100.0

== Committee assignments and key legislation ==
Yang Rohr serves on the following committees: Appropriations-General Service; Elementary and Secondary Education: School Curriculum Policies; Financial Institutions; Insurance; Personnel and Pensions; Veterans' Affairs.

During the 2021 General Session, Yang Rohr sponsored the Mental Health Early Action on Campus Act, which requires school districts and public colleges and university to provide contact information for the National Suicide Prevention Lifeline, the Crisis Text Line, and a local suicide prevention hotline on their school-issued identification cards.

Yang Rohr also sponsored the Opioid Overdose Reduction Act, which provides that a person experiencing an overdose shall not be charged or prosecuted for possession of a controlled, counterfeit, or look-alike substance or a controlled substance analog if the evidence for the possession charge was acquired as a result of the person seeking or obtaining emergency medical assistance.

== Caucus memberships ==
Yang Rohr is a member of the Women's Caucus and the Asian Caucus within the Illinois House of Representatives.

== Personal life ==
She lives in Naperville, Illinois. She is married and is a mother to three children.
