= 2022 Illinois Attorney General election =

- November 8, 2022
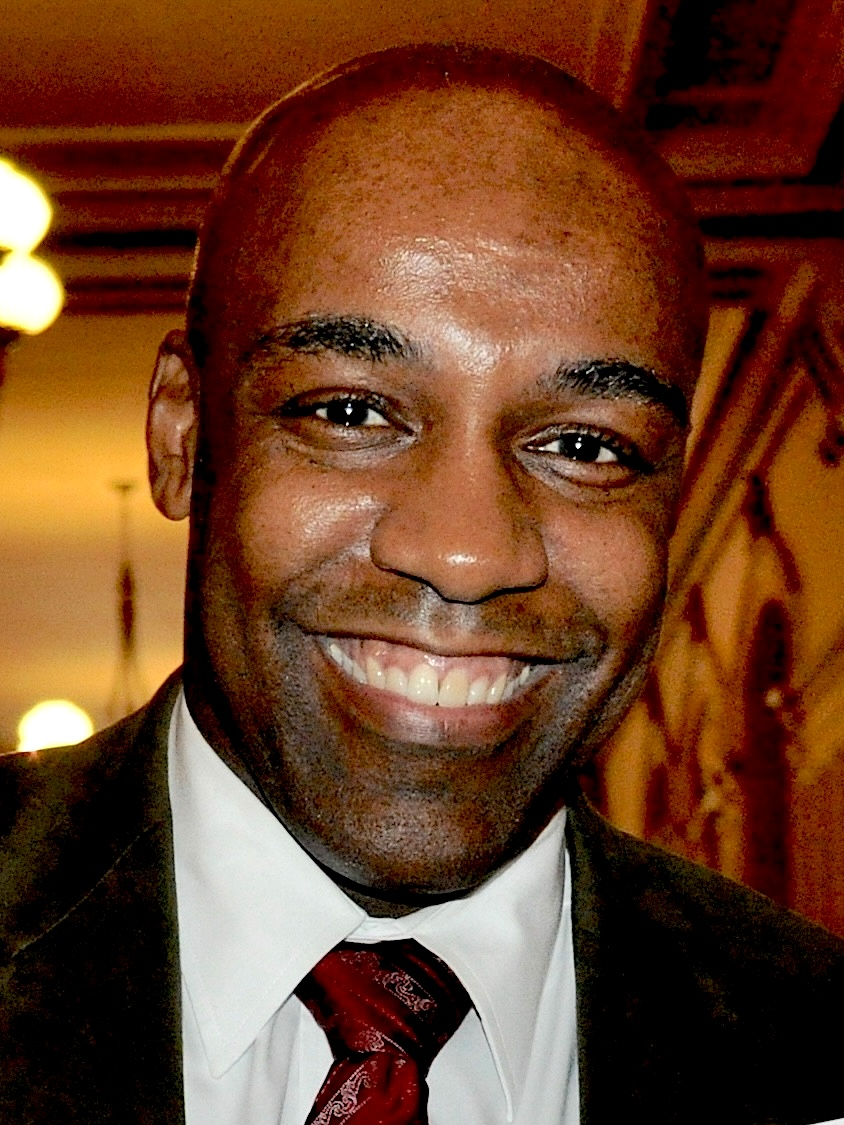

Nominee	Kwame Raoul	Tom DeVore
Party	Democratic	Republican
Popular vote	2,219,420	1,774,468
Percentage	54.35%	43.45%
- Raoul: 40–50% 50–60% 60–70% 70–80% 80–90% >90% DeVore: 40–50% 50–60% 60–70% 70–80% 80–90% >90% Tie: 40–50% 50%
Attorney General before election
Kwame Raoul
Democratic
Elected Attorney General
Kwame Raoul
Democratic

The 2022 Illinois Attorney General election took place on November 8, 2022, to elect the Attorney General of Illinois. Incumbent Democratic Attorney General Kwame Raoul won re-election to a second term.

== Democratic primary ==
=== Candidates ===
==== Nominee ====
- Kwame Raoul, incumbent attorney general

=== Endorsements ===
Kwame Raoul

Organizations

- Equality Illinois

Labor unions

- Illinois AFL–CIO
- International Union of Operating Engineers Local 150

=== Results ===
Democratic primary results
Party	Candidate	Votes	%
Democratic	Kwame Raoul (incumbent)	830,578	100.0%
Total votes		830,578	100.0%

== Republican primary ==
=== Candidates ===
==== Nominee ====
- Tom DeVore, lawyer

==== Eliminated in primary ====
- Steve Kim, business attorney, Republican nominee for attorney general in 2010, and Republican candidate for Lieutenant Governor in 2014
- David Shestokas, attorney

==== Endorsements ====
Tom DeVore

Organizations

- Illinois Fraternal Order of Police
Steve Kim

Statewide officials

- Jim Edgar, former Governor of Illinois (1991–1999)
- Dan Rutherford, former Illinois Treasurer (2011–2015)

Newspapers

- Daily Herald

=== Polling ===
Poll source	Date(s) administered	Sample size (Note: Key: A – all adults RV – registered voters LV – likely voters V – unclear)	Margin of error	Tom DeVore	Steve Kim	David Shestokas	Undecided
Ogden & Fry (R)	June 24, 2022	518 (LV)	± 4.4%	28%	27%	10%	35%
Ogden & Fry (R)	June 11–12, 2022	662 (LV)	± 3.9%	21%	25%	10%	45%
Public Policy Polling (D)	June 6–7, 2022	677 (LV)	± 3.8%	20%	18%	3%	59%

=== Results ===
Results by county DeVore: 30–40%; 40–50%; 50–60%; 60–70%; Kim: 30–40%; 40–50%; 50–60%

Republican primary results
Party	Candidate	Votes	%
Republican	Thomas G. DeVore	316,726	44.21%
Republican	Steve Kim	248,652	34.71%
Republican	David Shestokas	151,045	21.08%
Total votes		716,423	100.0%

== General election ==
=== Predictions ===
Source	Ranking	As of
Sabato's Crystal Ball	Safe D	September 14, 2022
Elections Daily	Safe D	November 1, 2022

=== Post-primary endorsements ===
Kwame Raoul (D)

Organizations

- Human Rights Campaign

Labor unions

- United Mine Workers

Newspapers

- Chicago Tribune
Tom DeVore (R)

Organizations

- Chicago Fraternal Order of Police

=== Polling ===
Poll source	Date(s) administered	Sample size	Margin of error	Kwame Raoul (D)	Thomas DeVore (R)	Other	Undecided
Emerson College	October 20–24, 2022	1,000 (LV)	± 3.0%	47%	39%	6% (Note: Robin (L) with 4%; "Someone else" with 2%)	9%
Research America	October 5–11, 2022	1,000 (RV)	± 3.1%	42%	25%	10% (Note: Robin with 6%; "None" with 4%)	22%

=== Results ===
2022 Illinois Attorney General election
Party	Candidate	Votes	%	±%
Democratic	Kwame Raoul (incumbent)	2,219,420	54.35%	−0.36%
Republican	Thomas G. DeVore	1,774,468	43.45%	+0.71%
Libertarian	Daniel K. Robin	89,664	2.20%	−0.35%
Total votes		4,083,552	100.0%	
Democratic hold				

==== By congressional district ====
Raoul won 13 of 17 congressional districts, with the remaining four going to DeVore, including one that elected a Democrat.

District	Raoul	DeVore	Representative
1st	68%	30%	Bobby Rush (117th Congress)
1st	68%	30%	Jonathan Jackson (118th Congress)
2nd	66%	32%	Robin Kelly
3rd	67%	30%	Marie Newman (117th Congress)
3rd	67%	30%	Delia Ramirez (118th Congress)
4th	68%	30%	Chuy García
5th	68%	30%	Mike Quigley
6th	53%	45%	Sean Casten
7th	84%	14%	Danny Davis
8th	55%	43%	Raja Krishnamoorthi
9th	70%	28%	Jan Schakowsky
10th	60%	38%	Brad Schneider
11th	54%	43%	Bill Foster
12th	25%	72%	Mike Bost
13th	53%	45%	Nikki Budzinski
14th	52%	45%	Lauren Underwood
15th	28%	70%	Mary Miller
16th	34%	63%	Darin LaHood
17th	48%	49%	Cheri Bustos (117th Congress)
17th	48%	49%	Eric Sorensen (118th Congress)

== See also ==
- Illinois Attorney General
