= Kwame Raoul =

American politician (born 1964)

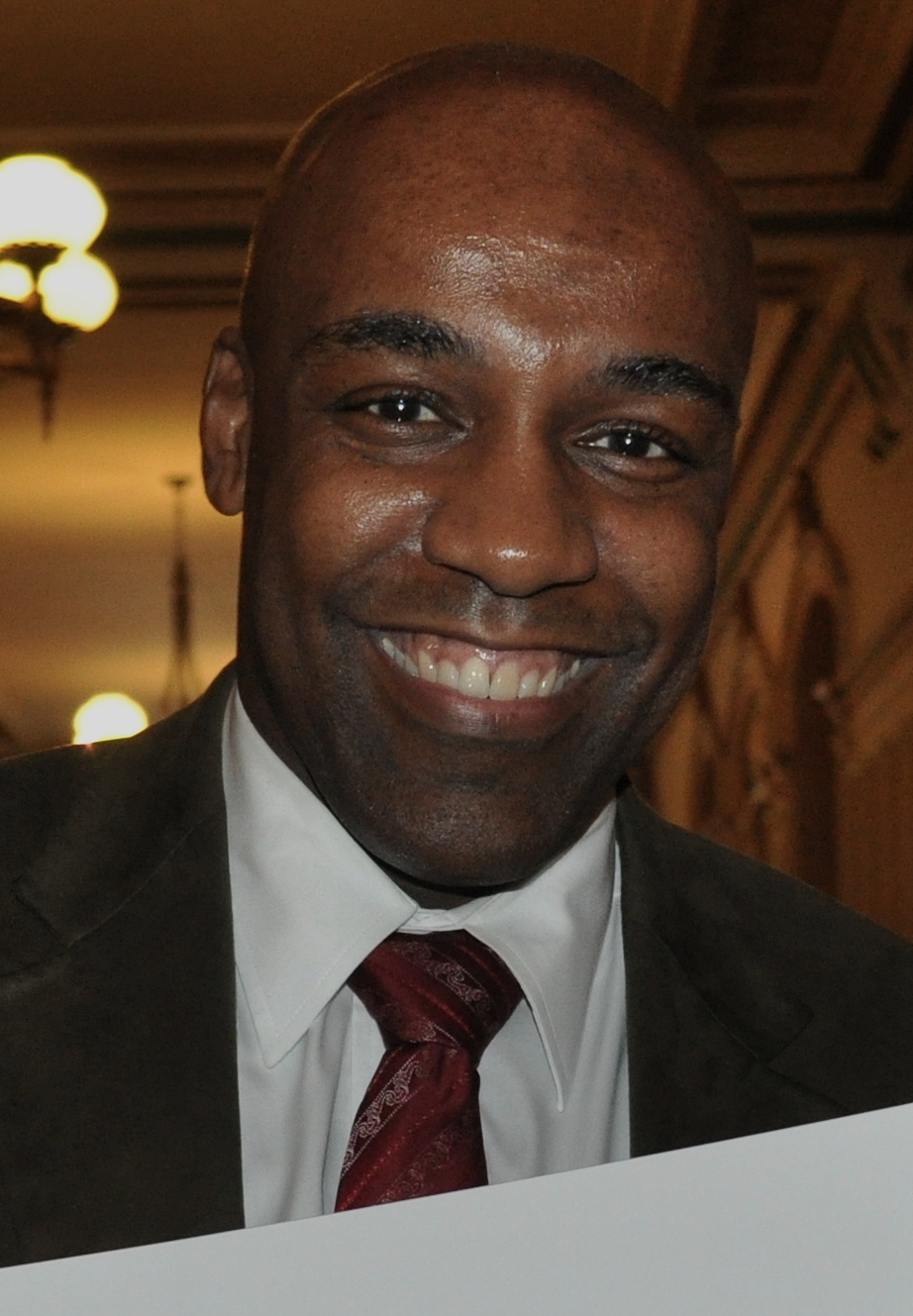
- Raoul in 2009

42nd Attorney General of Illinois
- Incumbent
- Assumed office January 14, 2019
- Governor: JB Pritzker
- Preceded by: Lisa Madigan

Member of the Illinois Senate from the 13th district
- In office November 6, 2004 – January 5, 2019
- Preceded by: Barack Obama
- Succeeded by: Robert Peters

Personal details
- Born: September 30, 1964 (age 62) Chicago, Illinois, U.S.
- Party: Democratic
- Spouse: Lisa Moore
- Children: 2
- Education: DePaul University (BA); Illinois Institute of Technology (JD)

Kwame Y. Raoul (/ˈkwɑːmeɪ rɑːˈuːl/ KWAH-may rah-OOL; born September 30, 1964) is an American lawyer and politician who has been serving the 42nd attorney general of Illinois since 2019. He is a member of the Democratic Party.

Raoul represented the 13th district in the Illinois Senate from 2004 to 2019. Initially appointed to fill the seat vacated by Barack Obama when Obama was elected to the U.S. Senate in 2004, Raoul won subsequent election and reelection. He served as Chair of the Senate Judiciary Committee, Vice Chair of the Senate Criminal Law Committee, and as a member of the Executive, Gaming, Insurance and Public Health Committees.

== Early life ==
Raoul was born in Chicago to Haitian immigrant parents Dr. Janin and Marie Therese Raoul. Raoul earned his B.A. degree in political science from DePaul University and went on to receive his J.D. degree from Chicago-Kent College of Law.

== Early career ==
Raoul served as a partner of the law firm of Quarles & Brady, with a practice concentrating on employment and labor litigation. Raoul also served as Cook County prosecutor and previously worked as senior counsel for the City Colleges of Chicago.

Raoul unsuccessfully challenged incumbent 4th ward Chicago alderman Toni Preckwinkle in both the 1995 and 1999 aldermanic elections.

== Senate career ==
Raoul was appointed on November 6, 2004, to fill the state Senate vacancy caused by the resignation of his predecessor, Barack Obama, who had been elected to the United States Senate.

During his time as Senator, Raoul successfully advanced legislation promoting civil justice, early childhood education, domestic violence prevention, and political reform. In his first year in the General Assembly, Raoul established a progressive agenda. His work led to the passage of laws expanding access to early voting in Illinois and the state's Low Income Energy Assistance Program, as well as a crackdown on the payday loan industry.

Raoul sponsored a bill that would require grants distributed by Illinois State Board of Education to early childhood education and preschool programs be used to improve and expand the quality of services. He also backed legislation aimed at easing the reintegration of ex-offenders into the community. This legislation allows good conduct credit to be awarded to inmates who earn their high school diplomas or GEDs, as well as inmates who participate in substance abuse programs.

Raoul has championed legislation on criminal justice reform, including legislation that abolishes the death penalty and legislation creating the Torture Inquiry Commission. He also championed legislation aimed at breaking the code of silence by deterring intimidation of those who cooperate with law enforcement officers.

Raoul has supported efforts to create and retain jobs in the state of Illinois, including his sponsorship of legislation to extend the Economic Development for a Growing Economy (EDGE) tax credit to companies. He also championed the effort to pass comprehensive workers' compensation reform.

As chairman of the Senate's Pension and Investment Committee, Raoul advocated for pension ethics reform and led efforts to expand opportunities for minority and women-owned financial service firms. As chairman of the Senate's Redistricting Committee, Raoul introduced legislation that created the Illinois Voting Rights Act to protect racial and language minorities in the legislative redistricting process. In addition, Raoul served as Chair of the Judiciary Committee, Vice-Chair of the Criminal Law Committee and a member of the Executive, Gaming, Insurance and Public Health Committees.

Raoul was among the candidates Illinois Governor Rod Blagojevich considered to fill Barack Obama's U.S. Senate seat upon Obama's victory in the 2008 presidential election. Raoul withdrew his name from consideration, wary of entering into a quid pro quo with the governor, who later became embroiled in a corruption scandal over his attempt to sell the appointment.

Raoul was succeeded in the Illinois Senate by activist Robert Peters, who was appointed by Democratic leaders of the district.

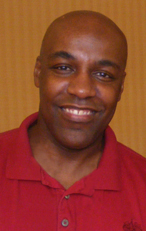
Raoul in 2009

== Attorney General of Illinois ==
=== 2018 election ===
In September 2017, Raoul launched his campaign for Attorney General of Illinois; originally he was expected to run for Mayor of Chicago in 2019 but declined. Among a crowded field of eight Democratic candidates, Raoul received several significant endorsements: Congressman Danny K. Davis of Illinois's 7th congressional district, President of the Illinois Senate John Cullerton, the Chicago Teachers Union, the Cook County Democratic Party, and the Madison County Democratic Party.

According to Raoul's campaign website, he supports ratification of the Equal Rights Amendment and co-sponsored the Equal Wage Act in Illinois, which was later vetoed by Governor Rauner. He believes that abortion should be safe, legal, and accessible. He supports increasing gun restrictions and reforming the criminal justice system.

Raoul won the Democratic primary election on March 20, 2018 winning 30% of the vote in an eight-way primary contest that included, among others, former governor Pat Quinn. In the general election, he faced Republican nominee Erika Harold, a former Miss America and Champaign/Urbana, Illinois attorney who won her two-way contest with 59% of the vote. On November 6, 2018, Raoul defeated Harold with 54% of the vote.

=== 2022 election ===
Raoul ran in the Democratic primary unopposed. On November 8, 2022, he defeated Republican Tom DeVore in the general election, receiving 54% of the vote and winning a second term.

== Personal life ==
Raoul lives in the Hyde Park/Kenwood area. He is married to Dr. Lisa Moore and has two children, Che and Mizan. He is a life member of Kappa Alpha Psi fraternity (Theta Zeta chapter) and a founding member of the Haitian American Lawyers Association of Illinois. Raoul is a prostate cancer survivor.

Raoul has directed volunteer legal clinics in his district. He has served on the board of directors of the Cook County Bar Association and the North Central province of Kappa Alpha Psi fraternity. He has coached Hyde Park Biddy Basketball and has been an AYSO soccer volunteer. He has participated in voter registration campaigns with Rainbow/PUSH and has served as a volunteer Election Day lawyer.

Raoul was raised Catholic.

== Electoral history ==
1995 Chicago 4th Ward aldermanic election
Candidate	Votes	%
Toni Preckwinkle (incumbent)	6,027	56.6
Kwame Raoul	2,259	21.2
Maurice Perkins	1,795	16.9
Brian Marshall	563	5.3

1999 Chicago 4th Ward aldermanic election
Candidate	Votes	%
Toni Preckwinkle (incumbent)	7,069	60.5
Charles S. Williams	2,540	21.7
Kwame Raoul	2,082	17.8

2006 Illinois Senate 13th district Democratic primary
Party	Candidate	Votes	%
Democratic	Kwame Raoul (incumbent)	27,278	100.00
Total votes		27,278	100

2006 Illinois Senate 13th district election
Party	Candidate	Votes	%
Democratic	Kwame Raoul (incumbent)	49,616	89.63
Republican	Charles Kinzer	5,743	10.37
Total votes		55,359	100

2010 Illinois Senate 13th district Democratic primary
Party	Candidate	Votes	%
Democratic	Kwame Raoul (incumbent)	26,940	100.00
Total votes		26,940	100

2010 Illinois Senate 13th district election
Party	Candidate	Votes	%
Democratic	Kwame Raoul (incumbent)	52,254	100.00
Total votes		52,254	100

2012 Illinois Senate 13th district Democratic primary
Party	Candidate	Votes	%
Democratic	Kwame Raoul (incumbent)	22,437	100.00
Total votes		22,437	100

2012 Illinois Senate 13th district election
Party	Candidate	Votes	%
Democratic	Kwame Raoul (incumbent)	74,295	100.00
Total votes		74,295	100

2016 Illinois Senate 13th district Democratic primary
Party	Candidate	Votes	%
Democratic	Kwame Raoul (incumbent)	47,391	100.00
Total votes		47,391	100

2016 Illinois Senate 13th district election
Party	Candidate	Votes	%
Democratic	Kwame Raoul (incumbent)	78,792	100.00
Total votes		78,792	100

2018 Illinois Attorney General Democratic primary results
Party	Candidate	Votes	%
Democratic	Kwame Raoul	390,472	30.17
Democratic	Pat Quinn	352,425	27.23
Democratic	Sharon Fairley	164,304	12.70
Democratic	Nancy Rotering	123,446	9.54
Democratic	Scott Drury	102,193	7.90
Democratic	Jesse Ruiz	70,158	5.42
Democratic	Renato Mariotti	51,902	4.01
Democratic	Aaron Goldstein	39,196	3.03
Total votes		1,294,096	100

2018 Illinois Attorney General election
Party	Candidate	Votes	%
Democratic	Kwame Raoul	2,488,326	54.71%
Republican	Erika Harold	1,944,142	42.74%
Libertarian	Bubba Harsy	115,941	2.55%
Total votes		4,548,409	100.0%

2022 Illinois Attorney General election
Party	Candidate	Votes	%
Democratic	Kwame Raoul (incumbent)	2,219,420	54.35%
Republican	Tom DeVore	1,774,468	43.45%
Libertarian	Daniel Robin	89,664	2.20%
Total votes		4,083,552	100.0%

2026 Illinois Attorney General election
Party	Candidate	Votes	%
Democratic	Kwame Raoul (incumbent)	2,512,455	61.6
Republican	Robert Fioretti	1,564,967	38.4
Total votes		4,077,422	100.0

Party political offices
Preceded by Lisa Madigan	Democratic nominee for Attorney General of Illinois; 2018, 2022, 2026	Most recent
Legal offices
Preceded by Lisa Madigan	Attorney General of Illinois; 2019–present	Incumbent
