= Darlene Senger =

American politician

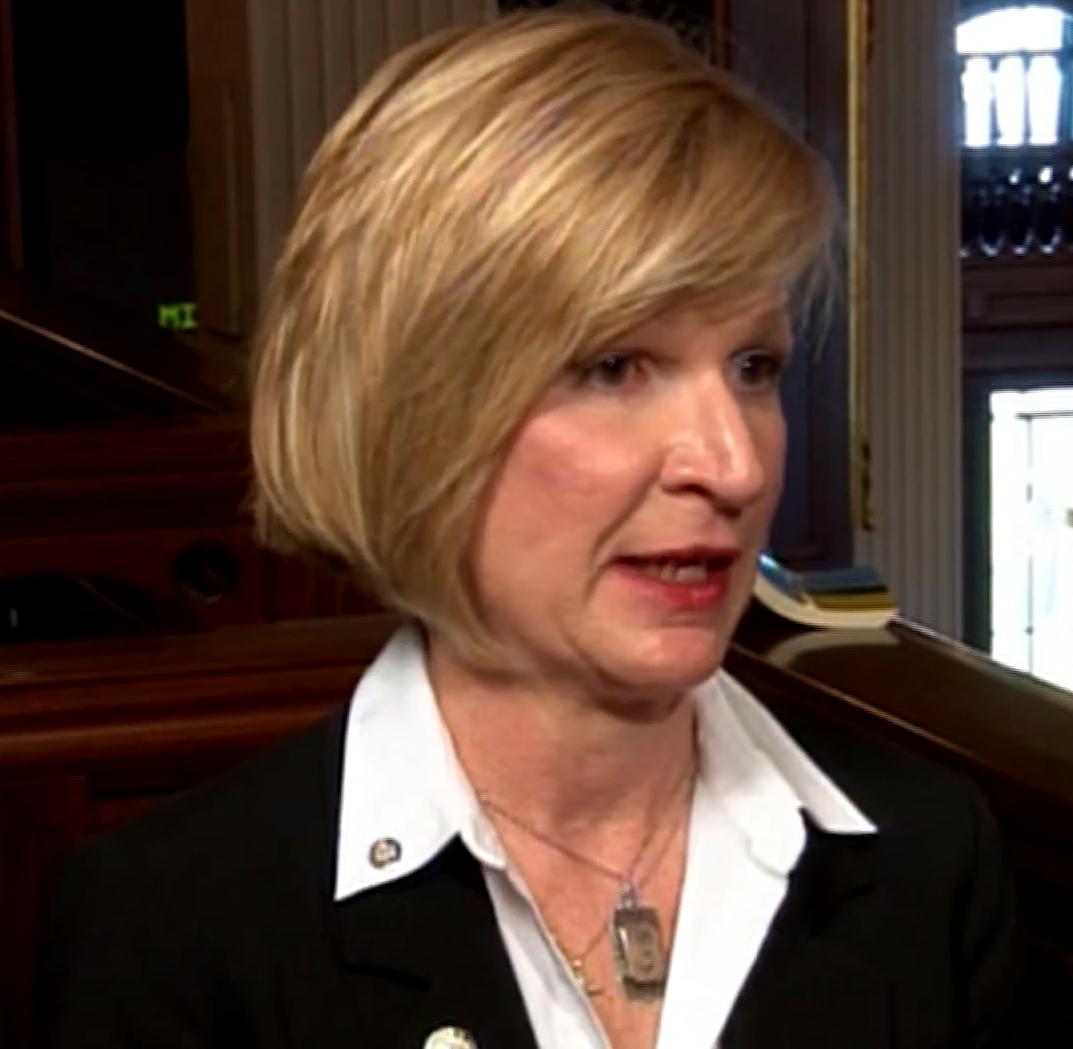

Member of the Illinois House of Representatives from the 41st district
- In office January 2013 – January 2015
- Preceded by: Chris Nybo
- Succeeded by: Grant Wehrli

Member of the Illinois House of Representatives from the 96th district
- In office January 2009 – January 2013
- Preceded by: Joe Dunn
- Succeeded by: Sue Scherer

Personal details
- Born: July 28, 1955 (age 70)
- Party: Republican
- Spouse: Terry
- Children: 2
- Education: Purdue University, West Lafayette (BSc); DePaul University (MBA)

Darlene J. Senger (born July 28, 1955) is an American politician. She was a member of the Naperville, Illinois City Council, where she served from 2002 to 2008, and was a Republican member of the Illinois House of Representatives from January 2009 to January 2015. In 2014, she unsuccessfully ran for Congress.

Senger is a legislative member of the American Legislative Exchange Council (ALEC). On August 7, 2017, it was announced that she would join the administration of Bruce Rauner as deputy chief of staff for legislative affairs, as part of a staff shake up that has seen multiple Illinois Policy Institute staffers join the Governor's administration.

== Legislation ==
In 2011, Rep. Senger placed a measure requiring more strict regulation of abortion clinics before the Illinois House's Agriculture and Conservation Committee. The measure passed the agricultural committee unanimously.

== 2014 Congressional campaign ==
Senger declared she would run for Illinois's 11th congressional district during the summer of 2013. She won a competitive Republican primary in March 2014 with 37% of the vote, defeating three other challengers. Senger then proceeded to the general election, where she would face Democratic incumbent Bill Foster. Foster defeated Senger 53.5%-46.5% in the general election on November 4, 2014.

Party political offices
Preceded by Leslie Munger	Republican nominee for Illinois Comptroller; 2018	Succeeded by Shannon Teresi
