= Grant Wehrli =

American politician

Member of the Illinois House of Representatives from the 41st district
- In office January 14, 2015 – January 13, 2021
- Preceded by: Darlene Senger
- Succeeded by: Janet Yang Rohr

Personal details
- Party: Republican
- Spouse: Sharon
- Children: 2
- Education: Southern Illinois University (B.Avn.)

Grant Wehrli is a former member of the Illinois House of Representatives. A Republican, he represented the 41st district from 2015 to 2021. The 41st district is located in the Naperville area. In the 2020 general election, Democratic candidate Janet Yang Rohr defeated Wehrli.

== Electoral history ==
Illinois 41st State House District General Election, 2014
Party	Candidate	Votes	%
Republican	Grant Wehrli	24,447	67.65
Democratic	Ed Agustin	11,690	32.35
Total votes		36,137	100.0

Illinois 41st State House District General Election, 2016
Party	Candidate	Votes	%
Republican	Grant Wehrli (incumbent)	42,654	100.0
Total votes		42,654	100.0

Illinois 41st State House District General Election, 2018
Party	Candidate	Votes	%
Republican	Grant Wehrli (incumbent)	24,798	52.00
Democratic	Val Montgomery	22,890	48.00
Total votes		47,688	100.0
