= Renato Mariotti =

American lawyer

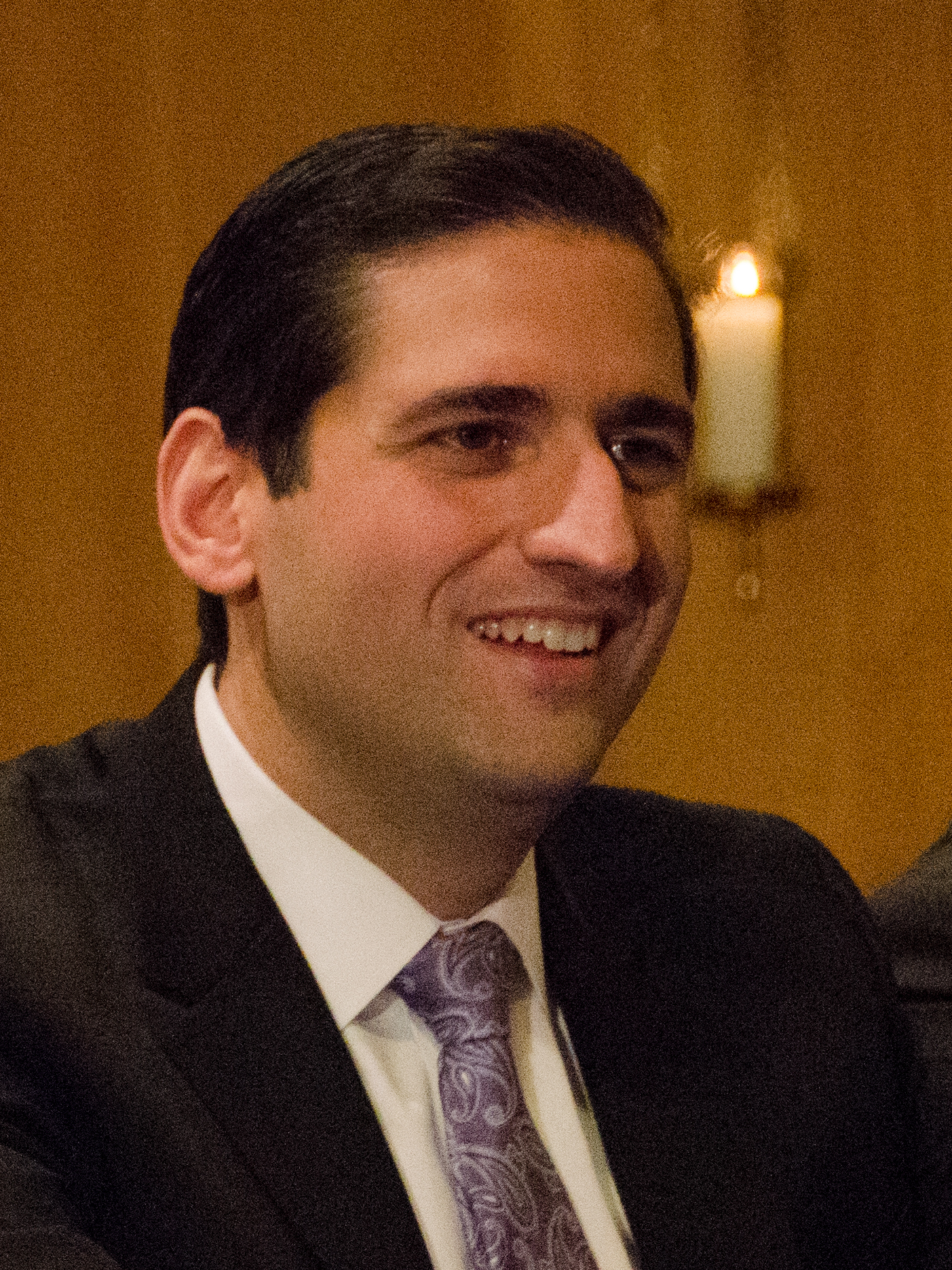
- Mariotti in 2018
- Born: Chicago, Illinois, U.S.
- Education: University of Chicago (BS); Yale University (JD)
- Occupations: Attorney, pundit

Renato Mariotti is an American attorney, legal commentator, acting fill-in anchor for WGN-TV and former federal prosecutor. On October 26, 2017, he announced his candidacy for Illinois Attorney General, but he lost in the Democratic primary election.

== Early life ==
Mariotti was born in Chicago to working-class parents and graduated from Naperville Central High School in 1994. He earned a B.S. in political science from the University of Chicago in 1998 and a J.D. degree from Yale Law School in 2001.

== Career ==
After law school he clerked for the U.S. Court of Appeals and practiced antitrust and securities litigation at Heller, Ehrman, White & Mcauliffe LLP from 2002 to 2007.

From 2007 to 2016 he worked for the U.S. Attorney's Office for the Northern District of Illinois, where he prosecuted white-collar crimes including commodities and securities fraud, health care fraud, mortgage fraud, and tax evasion.

Mariotti prosecuted the Bogdanov crime family, which was turned into an episode of CNBC's American Greed. Mariotti also convicted the "Second Hand Bandit", Jose Banks, who later escaped from prison. That case was also made into an American Greed episode. Mariotti was also responsible for indicting and convicting real estate mogul Laurance Freed for defrauding the City of Chicago, banks, and his business partner.

In 2015, Mariotti was the lead prosecutor in a financial spoofing case against financier Michael Coscia, United States v. Coscia, a groundbreaking commodities fraud case. This was the first criminal conviction of a high frequency trader. Mariotti explained financial "spoofing" to the jurors as a type of scam in which stock traders create computer programs to create fake buy and sell orders that flood the markets and move price in a direction that profits the scammer.

In 2016, he joined Thompson Coburn LLP, where he handles government-related financial cases.

Before announcing his candidacy for Illinois Attorney General, Mariotti was widely known as a commentator on legal issues pertaining to current events, with a large following on Twitter and regular appearances on MSNBC. His quotes and writings have appeared in The New York Times, Time, The Washington Post, Newsweek, and Politico, and he has made many television appearances on MSNBC, CNN, and CBS News.

== Candidacy for Illinois Attorney General ==
Mariotti ran as a Democrat to succeed Illinois Attorney General Lisa Madigan, who retired in 2018. In an interview with the Chicago Sun-Times he said his priority as attorney general would be economic justice: "People like my parents who are working hard and struggling to make ends meet, things haven't gotten better [for] them. Since the '80s or '90s, they have continued to struggle, [while] people at the top who are taking advantage of them are getting richer." He also pledged to focus on the problem of wage theft, estimating that over 50 million dollars in wages had been illegally withheld from workers in Illinois. Mariotti finished seventh out of eight candidates in the March 20, 2018, primary election.

== Electoral history ==
2018 Illinois Attorney General Democratic primary results
Party	Candidate	Votes	%
Democratic	Kwame Raoul	390,472	30.17
Democratic	Pat Quinn	352,425	27.23
Democratic	Sharon Fairley	164,304	12.70
Democratic	Nancy Rotering	123,446	9.54
Democratic	Scott Drury	102,193	7.90
Democratic	Jesse Ruiz	70,158	5.42
Democratic	Renato Mariotti	51,902	4.01
Democratic	Aaron Goldstein	39,196	3.03
Total votes		1,294,096	100

== See also ==
- 2018 Illinois Attorney General election
