= Scott Drury =

American politician

Scott R. Drury
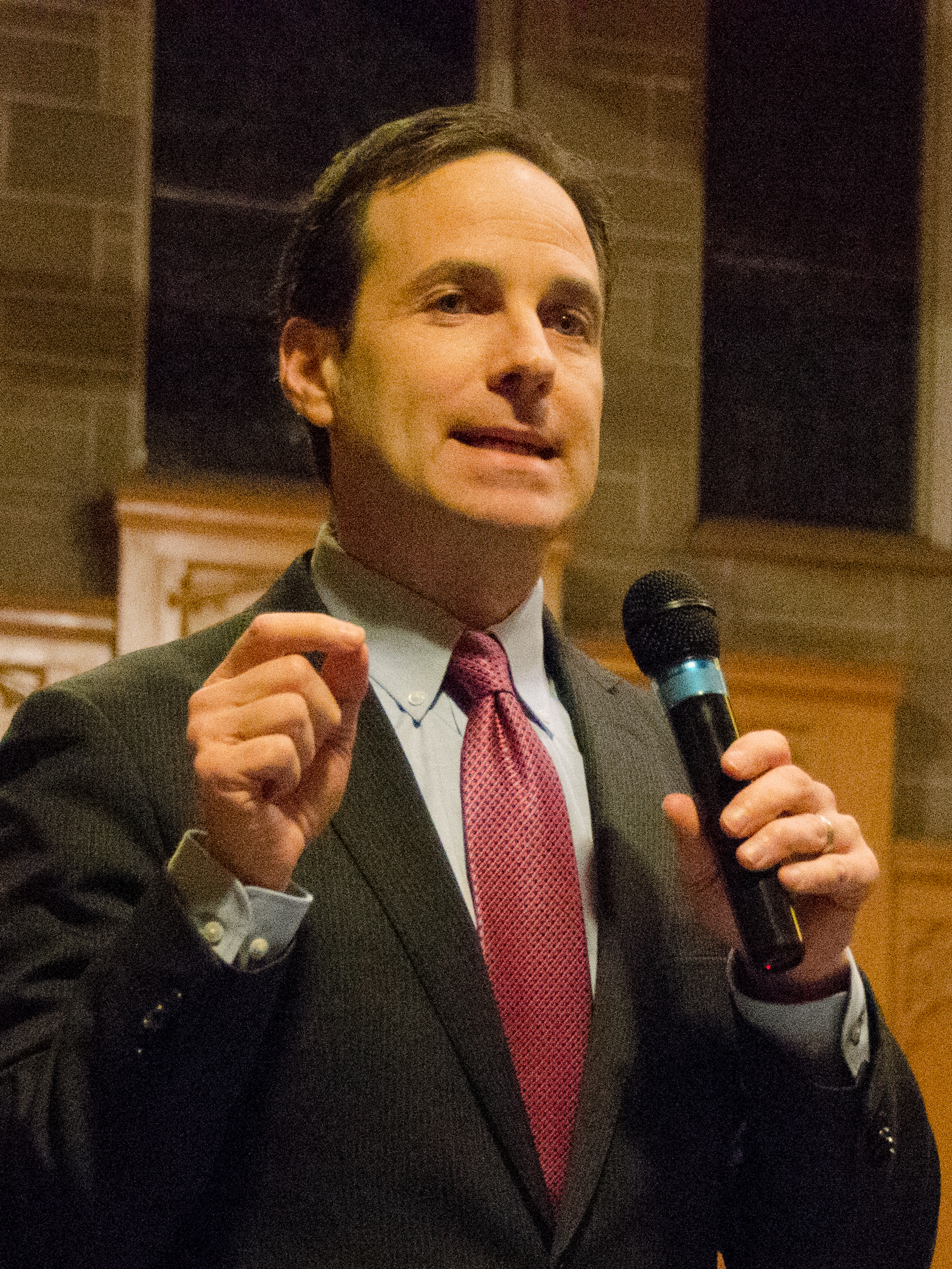
- Drury in 2018

Member of the Illinois House of Representatives from the 58th district
- In office January 9, 2013 – January 9, 2019
- Preceded by: Karen May
- Succeeded by: Bob Morgan

Personal details
- Born: 1972 (age 53–54)
- Party: Democratic
- Spouse: Shelby Drury
- Education: University of California (B.A.); Northwestern University (J.D.)
- Profession: Attorney
- Website: DruryLegal.com

Scott Drury (born 1972) is a former Illinois state representative for the 58th district and a Democratic candidate for Attorney General. The 58th district includes all or parts of Bannockburn, Deerfield, Glencoe, Highwood, Highland Park, Lake Bluff, Lake Forest, Lincolnshire, Northbrook and North Chicago.

He was a candidate in the Democratic Party primary for Attorney General of Illinois in the 2018 election. Prior to Attorney General Lisa Madigan announcing she would not run for reelection, Drury had been running for Governor of Illinois, in the 2018 election.

== Early life and career ==
Drury is a former Assistant U.S. Attorney and founder of Drury Legal, LLC. Drury is also an adjunct professor of law at the Northwestern University School of Law.

In November 2006, Drury prosecuted a 54 year-old priest for downloading child pornography.

== Political career ==
In 2012, Drury was elected to the Illinois House of Representatives, beating his opponent Mark Shaw with 55.7% of the vote. Drury has served in the Illinois General Assembly since 2013. Drury currently sits on the following House committees: Judiciary-Civil; Personnel and Pensions; Cybersecurity, Data Analytics and IT; Government Transparency; and Elementary Secondary Education - Charter School Policy. Drury previously was the Vice Chair of the House Judiciary-Criminal Committee. In 2015, Drury was appointed to serve as a commissioner on the Governor's newly created Commission on Criminal Justice and Sentencing Reform.

In 2013, Drury successfully worked with local municipalities to implement assault weapons regulations throughout the District he represents, during a 10 day window before municipalities in Illinois were prohibited from passing ordinances regulating assault weapons. In an interview with the Chicago Sun-Times, Drury said of the legislation: "If you don't do anything, you lose the right to do anything."

In 2013 and 2014, Drury successfully proposed a law that requires more custodial interrogations are recorded and new procedures for eyewitness identifications. This legislation was part of an effort to address the high number of wrongful convictions in the Illinois criminal justice system. Drury has received various awards for his work in this area, including the 2013 Jenner & Block Award, the Illinois Innocence Project's Defenders of the Innocent Award, and the First Defense Legal Fund's (FDLA) 20 for 20 Award.

In 2014, Drury co-sponsored a bill to criminalize revenge porn, which established penalties for offenders of one to three years in prison and fines of up to $250,000.

In 2014, Representative Drury voted Nay on a so-called "millionaire's tax" intended to help balance the Illinois budget. Drury and another Democrat, Rep. Jack Franks, joined every Republican lawmaker in publicly dismissing the millionaires’ tax, leaving the Democrats two votes shy of the 71 they need to move it forward.

In May 2016, Drury co-sponsored SB 250 which established automatic electronic voter registration.

In 2017, Drury voted "present" for Speaker of the Illinois House. The incumbent, Michael Madigan, was reelected.

== Election results ==
2018 Illinois Attorney General Democratic primary results
Party	Candidate	Votes	%
Democratic	Kwame Raoul	390,472	30.17
Democratic	Pat Quinn	352,425	27.23
Democratic	Sharon Fairley	164,304	12.70
Democratic	Nancy Rotering	123,446	9.54
Democratic	Scott Drury	102,193	7.90
Democratic	Jesse Ruiz	70,158	5.42
Democratic	Renato Mariotti	51,902	4.01
Democratic	Aaron Goldstein	39,196	3.03
Total votes		1,294,096	100

2016 Illinois House District 58
Party	Candidate	Votes	%
Democratic	Scott Drury	29,338	57.4%
Republican	Marty Blumenthal	21,756	42.6%
Majority

2014 Illinois House District 58
Party	Candidate	Votes	%
Democratic	Scott Drury	20,252	56%
Republican	Mark Neerhof	15,895	44%
Majority		20,252

2012 Illinois House District 58
Party	Candidate	Votes	%
Democratic	Scott Drury	27,295	55.8%
Republican	Mark Shaw	21,552	44.2%
Majority
