= Erika Harold =

American politician (born 1980)

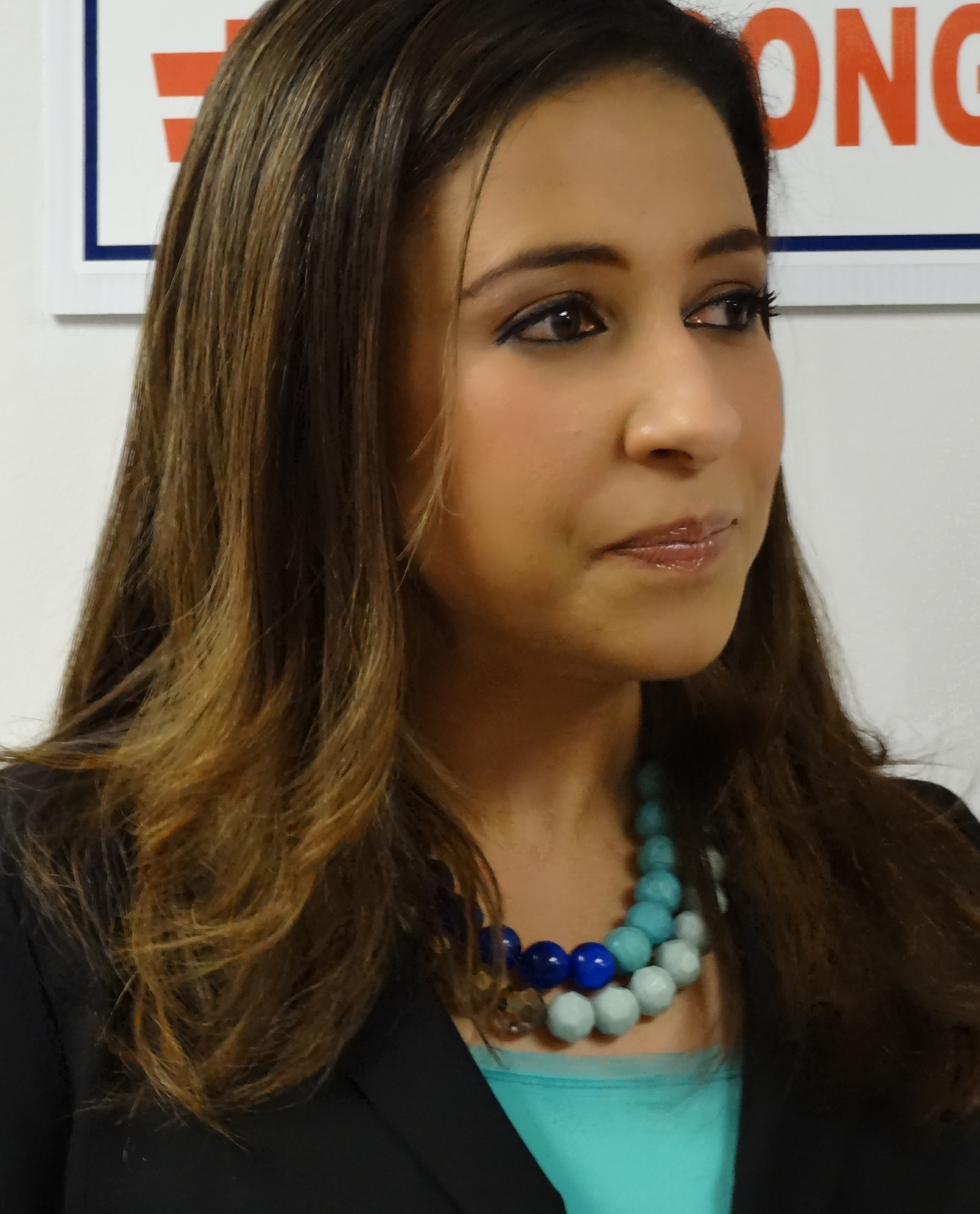
- Harold in St. Louis, Missouri, in January 2014
- Born: Erika Natalie Louise Harold; February 20, 1980 (age 46); Urbana, Illinois, US
- Education: University of Illinois, Urbana-Champaign (BA); Harvard University (JD)
- Title: Miss Illinois 2002; Miss America 2003
- Predecessor: Katie Harman
- Successor: Ericka Dunlap
- Political party: Republican

Erika Natalie Louise Harold (born February 20, 1980) is an American attorney, politician, and former Miss America.

Harold was Miss Illinois 2002 and Miss America 2003. Her pageant platform was combating bullying. In 2014, she was a candidate in the Republican primary for the 13th Congressional District seat in the State of Illinois, ultimately losing the nomination to the incumbent, Rodney Davis. In the 2018 election, she was the Republican nominee for Illinois Attorney General.

== Background and legal career ==
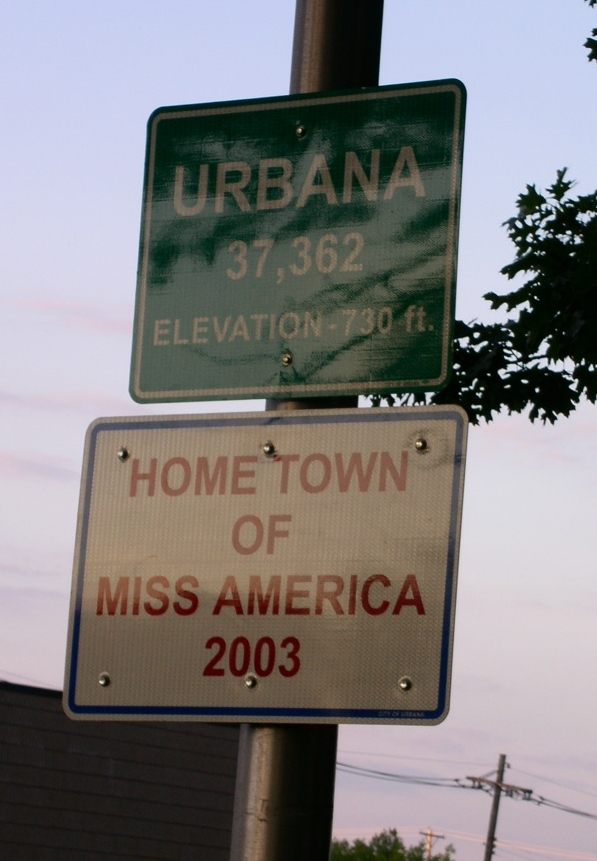
Sign for Urbana, Illinois honoring Harold

Harold was born in Urbana, Illinois. Her ethnicity includes Greek, German and English on her father's side; and on her mother's side, both Native American and African-American.

She graduated from the University of Illinois, Phi Beta Kappa with a B.A. in political science and was a Chancellor's Scholar. In 2007, she received her J.D. from Harvard Law School, where she won best brief in the Harvard Ames Moot Court semi-final and final rounds of competition. She has worked in Chicago, Illinois, as an associate attorney at Sidley Austin LLP and at Burke, Warren, MacKay & Serritella. She later was a commercial litigation attorney for Meyer Capel law firm in Champaign, Illinois. In 2022, she was appointed by the Illinois Supreme Court as executive director of the Commission on Professionalism.

== Pageants ==
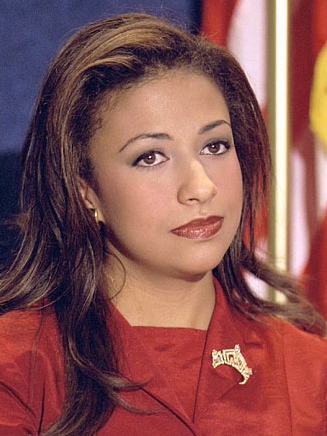
Miss America 2003 Erika Harold at a news conference at the National Press Club discussing her campaign to fight youth violence in 2002

She became Miss America 2003 on September 21, 2002 (as Miss Illinois 2002). Her official platform was "Preventing Youth Violence and Bullying: Protect Yourself, Respect Yourself." Her platform choice grew out of personal experience; she recounted having been the subject of racial and sexual harassment while growing up. In a May 2, 2003, speech, Harold said when she turned to teachers and school administrators, her concerns were dismissed. As part of her platform, she became a national spokesperson for Fight Crime: Invest in Kids, a national advocacy group.

In the first week of her reign, she also adopted a secondary platform for sexual abstinence. The Washington Times suggested that pageant officials demonstrated a liberal bias when they allowed Miss America 1998 Kate Shindle, whose platform was HIV prevention, to advocate condom distribution and needle exchange during her time as Miss America. On October 8, 2002, Harold gave a speech at the National Press Club in Washington during which she stated that she would talk about sexual abstinence and that she "will not be bullied" into dropping the topic from her platform. Thirty-eight members of Congress sent her a letter of support, encouraging her to press on with her "healthy message of abstinence until marriage." During her time as Miss America, Harold interacted with legislators and testified before Congress on bullying and abstinence, which provided her with additional motivation to pursue a political career.

== Politics ==
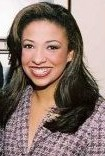
Miss America 2003 Erika Harold

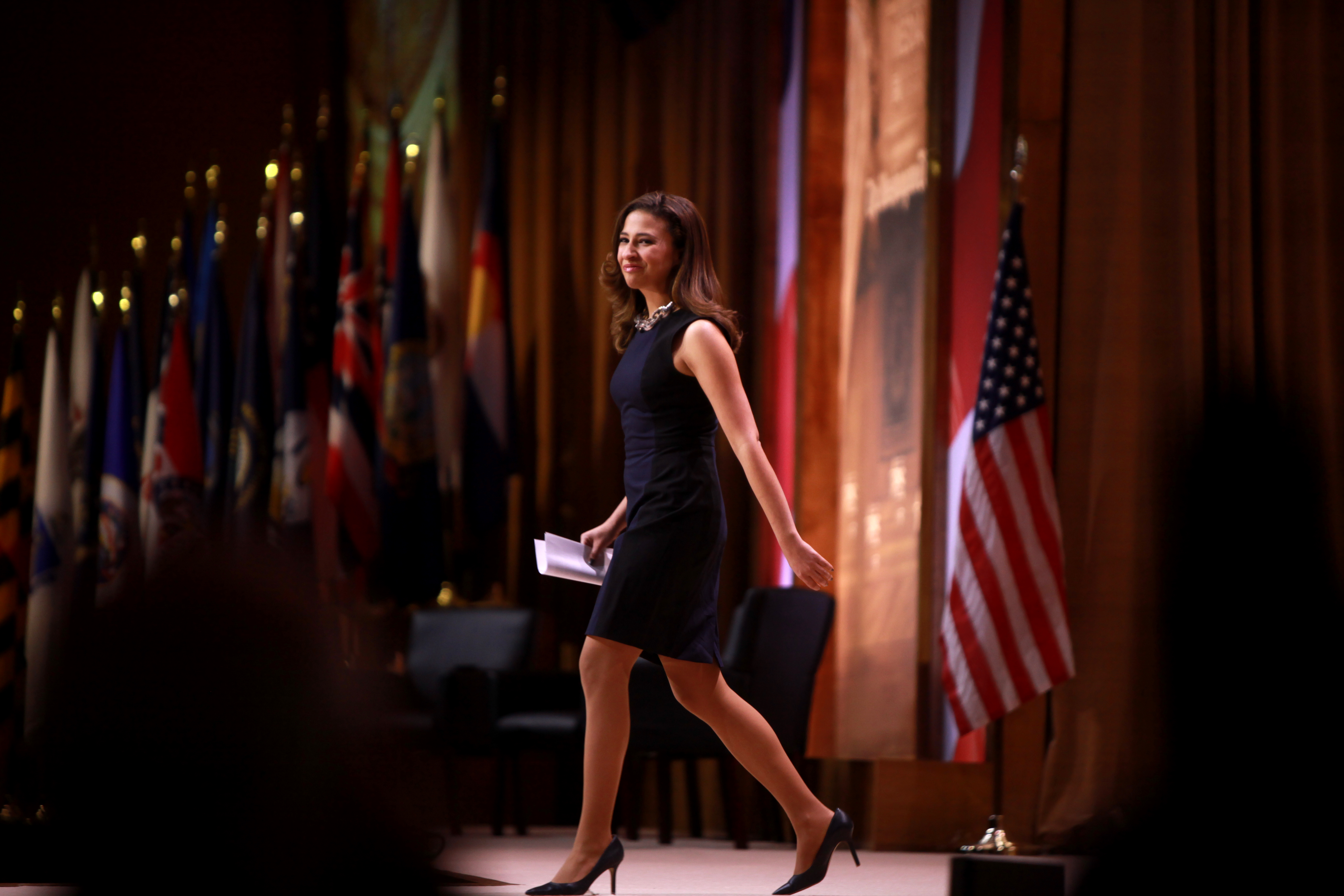
Harold at the Conservative Political Action Conference in 2014

Harold is a Republican, and was the Youth Director for the Republican primary campaign of Illinois gubernatorial candidate Patrick O'Malley. She later served as a delegate to the 2004 Republican National Convention. She gave a speech to the convention on August 31, 2004, to support George W. Bush's faith-based initiatives. She worked on the Bush campaign to reach out to minority voters.

In May 2012, Harold was one of four finalists for the Republican nomination for Congress in Illinois's 13th district, a nomination selected by the Republican chairmen of the 14 counties covered by the 13th Congressional District, instead of a primary election. The Republican chairmen selected Rodney L. Davis, over Harold, and Davis was subsequently elected to Congress, in an expensive race.

=== 2014 congressional campaign ===
On June 4, 2013, Harold announced she would run against Rep. Rodney L. Davis, R-Ill. in the 2014 Republican primary for Illinois's 13th congressional district. Davis, Harold's opponent in the primary, was among the top targets for Democrats in 2014. On March 18, 2014, Harold lost the Republican primary to Davis 54%–41%.

=== 2018 campaign for Illinois attorney general ===
On August 15, 2017, Harold announced that she would seek the Republican nomination to be Illinois attorney general. On March 20, 2018, she won the Republican nomination for attorney general garnering 59% of the vote in a two-way contest against Gary Grasso, a former mayor of Burr Ridge, IL, now a member of the DuPage County Board and a litigation attorney. She lost the general election to Democrat Kwame Raoul garnering 43% of the vote to his 55%.

=== Electoral history ===
Illinois's 13th congressional district Republican primary results, 2014
Party	Candidate	Votes	%
Republican	Rodney L. Davis	27,816	55
Republican	Erika Harold	20,951	41
Republican	Michael Firsching	2,147	4
Total votes		50,914	100

Illinois Attorney General election, 2018 Republican primary results
Party	Candidate	Votes	%
Republican	Erika Harold	378,707	59.15
Republican	Gary Grasso	261,509	40.85
Total votes		640,216	100.0

Illinois Attorney General election, 2018
Party	Candidate	Votes	%
Democratic	Kwame Raoul	2,488,326	54.7
Republican	Erika Harold	1,944,142	42.7
Libertarian	Bubba Harsy	115,941	2.6
Total votes		4,548,409	100.0
Democratic hold			

Awards and achievements
Preceded by Kristin Castillo	Miss Illinois; 2002	Succeeded by Michelle LaGroue
Preceded by Katie Harman	Miss America; 2003	Succeeded by Ericka Dunlap
Party political offices
Preceded by Paul Schimpf	Republican nominee for Attorney General of Illinois; 2018	Succeeded by Tom DeVore
