= Jesse Ruiz (lawyer) =

American lawyer (born 1965)

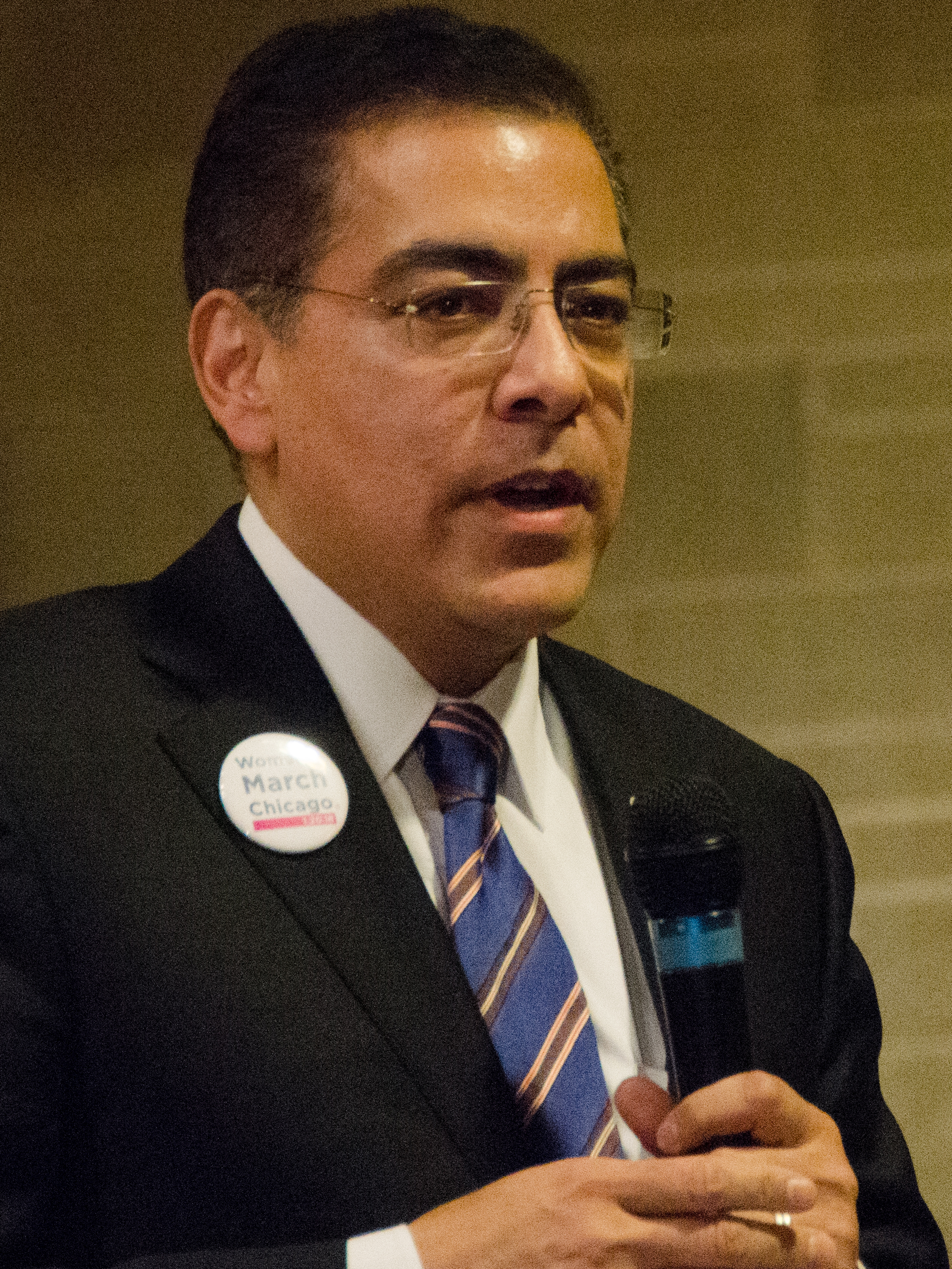
- Ruiz in 2018

Chairman of the University of Illinois System Board of Trustees
- Incumbent
- Assumed office January 22, 2025
- Preceded by: Donald Edwards

Deputy Governor of Illinois for Education
- In office January 2019 – August 2021
- Governor: J. B. Pritzker
- Succeeded by: Martin Torres

President of the Chicago Park District Board of Commissioners
- In office January 13, 2016 – 2019
- Preceded by: Bryan Traubert
- Succeeded by: Avis LaVelle

Interim CEO of Chicago Public Schools
- In office April 20, 2015 – July 27, 2015
- Mayor: Rahm Emanuel
- Preceded by: Barbara Byrd-Bennett
- Succeeded by: Forrest Claypool

Chairman of the Illinois State Board of Education
- In office September 2004 – May 2011
- Governor: Rod Blagojevich; Pat Quinn
- Preceded by: Janet Steiner
- Succeeded by: Gery Chico

Personal details
- Born: February 17, 1965 (age 61) Chicago, Illinois
- Party: Democratic
- Spouse: Michele
- Children: 2
- Education: University of Illinois at Urbana-Champaign (BA); University of Chicago Law School (JD)
- Profession: Lawyer
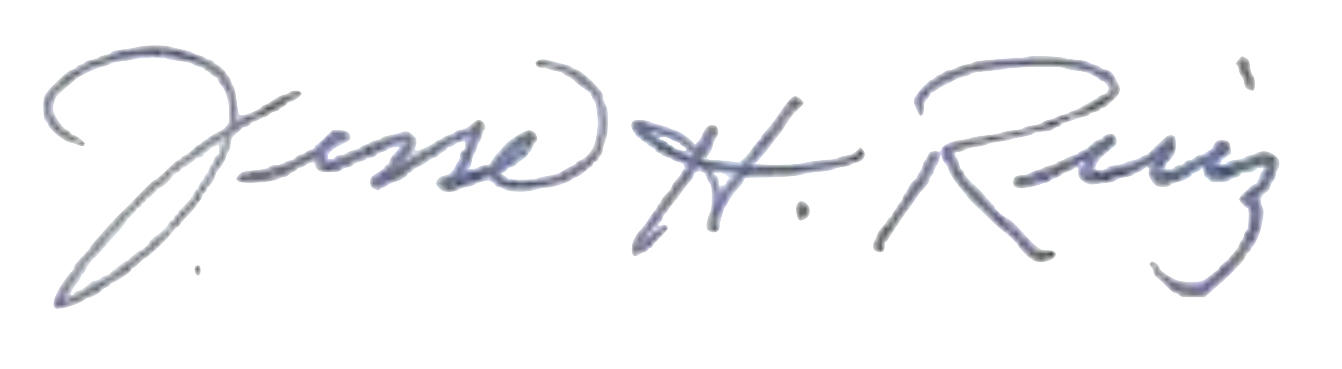
- Signature

Jesse H. Ruiz (born February 17, 1965) is an American lawyer, politician, and businessman. He has previously held the positions of deputy governor of Illinois for education, chairman of the Illinois State Board of Education, president of the Chicago Park District Board of Commissioners, vice president of the Chicago Board of Education, and interim CEO of Chicago Public Schools. He currently works in the private sector as chief compliance officer and general counsel to the Vistria Group. He also currently serves as chairman of the University of Illinois System Board of Trustees.

As a lawyer, Ruiz spent more than two decades as a partner at the firm Drinker Biddle & Reath. He is the former president of the Chicago Bar Association

Ruiz has been on the boards of a number of nonprofits, including the Chicago Community Trust. Ruiz also spent many years as a member of the board of directors for the company Commonwealth Edison.

In 2018, he unsuccessfully sought the Democratic Party nomination for Illinois Attorney General.

== Early life and education ==
Ruiz was born February 17, 1965 in Chicago. Ruiz was the son of Mexican immigrants. From 1948 through 1955. his father was an undocumented immigrant. His father had originally come to the United States legally in 1943 as part of the bracero program, and ultimately received a green card. Ruiz is the youngest of four children.

Ruiz grew up in the Roseland neighborhood of Chicago. For elementary school, Ruiz attended St. Anthony's. Ruiz graduated from Marist High School in 1983. He had been an honors student. In order to commute from his house to the high school, he needed to take three different Chicago Transit Authority busses.

Ruiz began his college career attending University of Illinois at Urbana-Champaign in its engineering program. However, by February of his freshman year, he was failing several classes, which he would retrospectively attribute to, "a combination of being unfocused and enjoying campus life too much." He dropped-out of the school, returning home and enrolled himself at Thornton Community College, while working part time as an auxiliary clerk at the American Medical Association. He then reapplied to the University of Illinois at Urbana-Champaign, this time seeking to be in its economics program. He was readmitted to the university. He graduated from University of Illinois at Urbana-Champaign in 1988 with a Bachelor of Arts degree in economics.

Beginning in 1992, Ruiz attended University of Chicago Law School, where he was editor of the University of Chicago Law School Round Table. While at University of Chicago Law School, he attended classes taught by then-professors Barack Obama and Elena Kagan. The course he took that was taught by Obama was a seminar course on racism and law. He graduated from with his J.D. degree in 1995.

== Private sector career ==
While attending Thornton Community College, Ruiz worked as an auxiliary clerk at the American Medical Association. In order to pay for his college tuition at University of Illinois-Champaign, Ruiz worked a variety of jobs, including jobs as a retail clerk, handyman, machine operator, and meter reader. After college, but before attending law school, Ruiz was a member of the sales departments of Inland Steel Company and Ryerson Coil Processing Company. In total, he spent four years working in the steel industry. Prior to practicing law, Ruiz also was a management consultant with Booz Allen Hamilton, where he was a member of the operations management group. He worked there from 1995 through 1997.

On October 30, 2006, Ruiz became a member of the board of directors of Commonwealth Edison. He continued to serve on the board for many years.

As of 2024, Ruiz is a lecturer at the University of Chicago LAw School.

=== Legal career ===
Ruiz was sworn into the bar in 1995.

In 1997, Ruiz was hired as an associate by Gardner Carton & Douglas. The firm would later merge into Drinker Biddle & Reath. Ruiz was a partner at the law firm for over twenty years. He focused on corporate securities, mergers and acquisitions and the representation of public and middle-market companies. He would leave his role in the firm in 2019. He worked with companies such as Walmart, Exelon. Ruiz also served as legal counsel to the Illinois Legislative Latino Caucus and the Illinois Legislative Latino Caucus Foundation.

Ruiz was on the American Bar Association's Commission on Hispanic Legal Rights and Responsibility, to which the president of the ABA had appointed him in August 2013.

Ruiz served as president of the Hispanic Lawyers Association of Illinois, chairman of the Hispanic Lawyers Scholarship Fund of Illinois, chairman of the Chicago Committee on Minorities in Large Law Firms.

Ruiz has taught as an adjunct professor in corporate law at UIC John Marshall Law School.

==== Chicago Bar Association ====
Ruiz was a board member of the Chicago Bar Association for a number of years. He served a year as the association's president.

He served as the 2017 campaign chair for the Chicago Bar Foundation's "Investing in Justice Campaign". For the 2017–2018 year, Ruiz served in the Chicago Bar Association's position of second vice president. For the 2018-2019 year, Ruiz served in the Chicago Bar Association's position of first vice president.

Ruiz served as the president of the Chicago Bar Association from 2019 through 2020. He was sworn in as president on June 18, 2019, succeeding Steven M. Elrod. Immediately after becoming president, he joined in with other voices to call for greater diversity on the benches of state courts. Amid the COVID-19 pandemic, Ruiz announced that the Chicago Bar Association would be waiving the administrative fee that it normally charged callers on its hotline who later engaged the attorney they spoke with for a consultation. On June 26, 2020, Ruiz was succeeded as president by Maryam Ahmad.

=== The Vistria Group ===
Since September 2021, Ruiz has served as chief operating officer and general counsel to the Vistria Group. Ruiz oversees all legal and compliance functions of The Vistria Group. In 2024, Crain's Chicago Business credited Ruiz with contributing to the doubling of the firm's size, increasing from one office to three and growing the value of the assets managed by the firm to more than $12.9 billion.

== Politics and public service ==
Between 1999 and 2004, Ruiz served as commissioner of the Illinois Supreme Court Character and Fitness Committee and commissioner of the Chicago Public Schools Desegregation Monitoring Commission. He had been appointed to the latter role by president of the Chicago Board of Education Gery Chico.

Ruiz served as legal counsel to the Illinois Legislative Latino Caucus and the Illinois Legislative Latino Caucus Foundation.

Politically, Ruiz supported the campaigns for office of his former law school professor Barack Obama. He volunteered as a canvasser and hosted a fundraiser for Obama's first Illinois State Senate campaign. He volunteered for Obama's presidential campaigns.

From February 2011 through 2013, Ruiz served on the United States Department of Education's Equity and Excellence Commission, to which United States Secretary of Education Arne Duncan had appointed him.

=== Chairman of the Illinois State Board of Education (2004–2011) ===
In September 2004, Ruiz was appointed by Governor Rod Blagojevich as chairman of the Illinois State Board of Education, becoming the first Hispanic individual to hold the position. He succeeded Janet Steiner. Ruiz resigned from the position in May 2011 after being appointed to the Chicago Board of Education.

During his tenure, Ruiz reacted to a school district violating federal law by refusing to enroll an undocumented immigrant student by taking the lead in having the Illinois State Board of Education, in an unprecedented move, cut the state funding of the school district in question. That school district reversed course the day after this move was taken by the Illinois State Board of Education.

=== Vice President of the Chicago Board of Education (2011–2016) ===
In May 2011, Chicago mayor Rahm Emanuel appointed Ruiz as vice president of the Chicago Board of Education. He resigned his position as vice president of the Chicago Board of Education in January 2016, after being confirmed by the Chicago City Council to the Chicago Park District Board of Commissioners.

=== Interim CEO of Chicago Public Schools (2015) ===
In April 2015, amid a pending leave-of-absence by Barbara Byrd-Bennett, Ruiz was voted by the Chicago Board of Education to serve as interim CEO of Chicago Public Schools. Byrd-Bennet's leave of absence, and the start of his interim tenure, began April 20. He served in this interim role for a total of three months. Byrd-Bennet resigned, amid Ruiz's interim tenure, on June 1, 2015.

Byrd-Bennet's leave of absence and subsequent resignation had been spurred by a federal bribery investigation into her.

Immediately after becoming interim CEO, Ruiz suspended $20 million no-bid contract that had been granted to SUPES Academy at the urging Byrd-Bennet, who previous worked for the company, in 2013. Previously, as a member of the Chicago Board of Education, Ruiz had voted along with all other members of the board in 2013 to approve that contract.

In July 2015, Forest Claypool was appointed Mayor Rahm Emanuel and the Chicago Board of Education to take office as permanent CEO of Chicago Public Schools effective July 27.

Years later, in 2024, Ruiz signed an open letter opposing Mayor Brandon Johnson's ouster of CEO Pedro Martinez.

=== President of the Chicago Park District Board of Commissioners (2016–2018) ===
On November 20, 2015, Mayor Emanuel announced that he would appoint Ruiz to the Board of Commissioners of the Chicago Park District, and that he recommended the other commissioners elect him the board's president. Ruiz's appointment was approved by Chicago City Council on January 13, 2016. He was elected president of the Chicago Park District Board of Commissioners the same day. He was reelected as president of the Chicago Park District Board on May 23, 2018.

Ruiz resigned from the Park District Board of Commissioners after being named as a deputy governor of Illinois, heading his final board meeting in December 2018. Ruiz was succeeded as Park District Board of Commissioners President in early 2019 by Avis LaVelle. His former seat on the board remained vacant until mayor Lori Lightfoot appointed Jose M. Muñoz to it in September 2019.

=== 2018 Illinois Attorney General campaign ===
Ruiz unsuccessfully ran for the Democratic Party nomination 2018 Illinois Attorney General election, placing sixth in a crowded field of eight candidates, receiving 5.4% of the vote.

Ruiz's campaign was chaired by Newton N. Minow, former chair of the Federal Communications Commission. The campaign's finance co-chairs included former United States secretary of commerce Penny Pritzker, Chicago Cubs co-owner and Lambda Legal board member Laura Ricketts, and former Exelon CEO John Rowe.

Ruiz's candidacy was endorsed by United States congressman Luis Gutierrez.

Citing his parents' Mexican immigrant background, Ruiz said that a motivating factor in his decision to seek the office were what he considered attacks on immigrant rights and minority rights by then-President Donald Trump. Ruiz ran on a pro-immigrant platform.

Among Ruiz's campaign promises were to protect the state's residents from what he considered to be attacks on them by then-President Trump, to implement criminal justice system reform, to strengthen the police, and to work to "remove weapons from the streets". He also pledged to eradicate political corruption, in order to guarantee an "honest and transparent government".

In reaction to the Cook County Democratic Party's decision to endorse Kwame Raoul for the office, Ruiz criticized what he characterized as the county party organization's decision to, "slate a fellow political insider", as being, "disappointing – but sadly, not surprising." Ruiz's negative characterization of Raoul as a "political insider" came despite the fact the Ruiz himself had strong connections to powerful politicians.

=== Deputy Governor of Illinois for Education (2018–2021) ===
In December 2018, governor-elect J. B. Pritzker designated Ruiz, alongside Daniel Hynes and Christian Mitchell, to be one of three deputy governors. Ruiz's purview as deputy governor pertained to education.

Amid the COVID-19 pandemic, Ruiz was involved in discussions as to whether youth sports could be safely conducted, including discussions with the Illinois High School Association and the Illinois Elementary School Association regarding whether youth sports.

In August 2021, it was announced that Ruiz would be stepping down from the position of deputy governor for education. Ruiz told the Chicago Sun-Times that he, "wasn’t looking to leave, but a great opportunity to return to private practice presented itself." Governor Pritzker credited Ruiz, upon his departure with having made, "an enormous difference for our entire state’s education systems."

=== University of Illinois System Board of Trustees (2023–present) ===
In October 2023, Governor Pritzker nominated Ruiz to serve on the University of Illinois System Board of Trustees for a term lasting through 2029. His nomination required state senate confirmation. Ruiz was confirmed. On January 22, 2025, the board unanimously voted to make Ruiz its new chairman, succeeding Donald Edwards in the role.

== Nonprofit board memberships ==
Ruiz has served on the boards of the Chicago Legal Clinic, Metropolitan Planning Council, Erie Neighborhood House, Chicago Commons, the Chicago Community Trust, the Economic Club, Chicago Public Education Fund, and the Hispanic Lawyers Association of Illinois.

== Personal life ==
Ruiz met his wife, Michele Ilene Ruiz, while attending University of Chicago Law School. His wife was a partner at the law firm Sidley Austin.

With his wife, Ruiz has two sons. While Ruiz is Catholic, his wife and sons are Jewish.

As of 2009, Ruiz and his family resided in the Wicker Park neighborhood of Chicago. As of 2017, they were living on Chicago's South Side.

== Awards and recognition ==
Ruiz was the convocation speaker for 2014 economics graduates from the University of Illinois at Champaign.

Awards

- Crain's Chicago Business "40 Under 40 Rising Stars in Chicago Business" (2003)
- Chicago Lawyer "40 Attorneys Under 40 in Illinois to Watch" (2003)
- Illinois Legislative Latino Caucus Foundation Leadership Award (2003 and 2009)
- El Valor Education Excellence Award (2007)
- National Association of State Boards of Education "Distinguished Service Award" (2011)
- Walmart Legal Department's Walmart Spark Award for "outstanding client and community service and dedication to diversity in the legal profession" (2011)
- Lawyers Lend-A-Hand to Youth Barristers Philanthropic Award (2012) -with Michele Ilene Ruiz
- University of Illinois "Illini of the Year Award" (2013)
- American Diabetes Association "Chicago Father of the Year" (2014)
- Hispanic National Bar Association "Latino Layer of the Year" (2014)
- Chicago Landmarks Preservation Excellence Awards (2019) -with Michele Ilene Ruiz
- Crain's Chicago Business "Chicago's Most Influential Latinos" honoree (2019)
- Crain's Chicago Business "Notable Latinos Leader" honoree (2024)

== Electoral history ==
2018 Illinois Attorney General Democratic primary results
Party	Candidate	Votes	%
Democratic	Kwame Raoul	390,472	30.17
Democratic	Pat Quinn	352,425	27.23
Democratic	Sharon Fairley	164,304	12.70
Democratic	Nancy Rotering	123,446	9.54
Democratic	Scott Drury	102,193	7.90
Democratic	Jesse Ruiz	70,158	5.42
Democratic	Renato Mariotti	51,902	4.01
Democratic	Aaron Goldstein	39,196	3.03
Total votes		1,294,096	100
