= Greenwood, Illinois =

Greenwood
- Village
- Location of Greenwood in McHenry County, Illinois.
- Coordinates: 42°23′58″N 88°22′32″W
- Country: United States
- State: Illinois
- County: McHenry

Area
  - Total: 2.66 sq mi (6.88 km^{2})
  - Land: 2.66 sq mi (6.88 km^{2})
  - Water: 0 sq mi (0.00 km^{2})
- Elevation: 889 ft (271 m)

Population (2020)
  - Total: 324
  - Density: 122.0/sq mi (47.09/km^{2})
- Time zone: UTC-6 (CST)
  - Summer (DST): UTC-5 (CDT)
- ZIP code: 60097 (Wonder Lake) and 60098 (Woodstock)
- Area code: 815
- FIPS code: 17-31667
- GNIS feature ID: 2398207

Greenwood is a village in McHenry County, Illinois, United States. It is a commuter village, part of the Chicago metropolitan area It was incorporated as a village on April 4, 1995. The population was 324 at the 2020 census.

== Geography ==
According to the 2010 census, Greenwood has a total area of 1.86 square miles (4.82 km^{2}), all land.

== Demographics ==
Historical population
Census	Pop.	Note	%±
1880	137		—
2000	244		—
2010	255		4.5%
2020	324		27.1%
U.S. Decennial Census

=== 2020 census ===
Greenwood village, Illinois – Racial and ethnic composition Note: the US Census treats Hispanic/Latino as an ethnic category. This table excludes Latinos from the racial categories and assigns them to a separate category. Hispanics/Latinos may be of any race.
Race / Ethnicity (NH = Non-Hispanic)	Pop 2000	Pop 2010	Pop 2020	% 2000	% 2010	% 2020
White alone (NH)	219	228	258	89.75%	89.41%	79.63%
Black or African American alone (NH)	0	0	2	0.00%	0.00%	0.62%
Native American or Alaska Native alone (NH)	0	0	1	0.00%	0.00%	0.31%
Asian alone (NH)	6	1	1	2.46%	0.39%	0.31%
Pacific Islander alone (NH)	0	0	0	0.00%	0.00%	0.00%
Other race alone (NH)	0	0	1	0.00%	0.00%	0.31%
Mixed race or Multiracial (NH)	3	3	9	1.23%	1.18%	2.78%
Hispanic or Latino (any race)	16	23	52	6.56%	9.02%	16.05%
Total	244	255	324	100.00%	100.00%	100.00%

=== 2000 census ===
As of the census of 2000, there were 244 people, 84 households, and 66 families residing in the village. The population density was 156.6 inhabitants per square mile (60.5/km^{2}). There were 86 housing units at an average density of 55.2 per square mile (21.3/km^{2}). The racial makeup of the village was 93.03% White, 2.46% Asian, 0.82% from other races, and 3.69% from two or more races. Hispanic or Latino of any race were 6.56% of the population.

There were 84 households, out of which 34.5% had children under the age of 18 living with them, 64.3% were married couples living together, 6.0% had a female householder with no husband present, and 21.4% were non-families. 16.7% of all households were made up of individuals, and 4.8% had someone living alone who was 65 years of age or older. The average household size was 2.90 and the average family size was 3.27.

In the village, the population was spread out, with 29.1% under the age of 18, 6.6% from 18 to 24, 28.3% from 25 to 44, 25.0% from 45 to 64, and 11.1% who were 65 years of age or older. The median age was 38 years. For every 100 females, there were 101.7 males. For every 100 females age 18 and over, there were 101.2 males.

The median income for a household in the village was $56,250, and the median income for a family was $65,179. Males had a median income of $40,000 versus $32,708 for females. The per capita income for the village was $19,216. About 3.2% of families and 7.2% of the population were below the poverty line, including 11.8% of those under the age of eighteen and none of those 65 or over.
