= Illinois State Board of Education =

Board that administrates public education in Illinois

Coordinates: 39°48′8.6″N 89°39′15.8″W

The Illinois State Board of Education (ISBE) administers public education in the state of Illinois. The State Board consists of nine members who are appointed by the Governor with the consent of the Senate. Board members serve four-year terms, with State Board membership limited to two consecutive terms. The board sets educational policies and guidelines for public and private schools, preschool through grade 12. It analyzes the aims, needs and requirements of education and recommends legislation to the Illinois General Assembly and Governor for the benefit of the more than 2 million school children in the state.

Local municipalities and their respective school districts operate individual public schools but the ISBE audits performance of public schools with the Illinois School Report Card. The agency is headquartered at 100 North 1st Street in Springfield. The agency also has offices at the James R. Thompson Center in the Chicago Loop.

The ISBE also oversaw private business schools and other vocational schools until 2012, when responsibility for regulating those schools was transferred to the Illinois Board of Higher Education.

== Overview ==
Under the 1970 Illinois Constitution, the modern ISBE board replaced the elected position of Illinois state superintendent, assuming its powers on January 12, 1975.

The ISBE describes itself as an agency that "commits to promoting and implementing comprehensive policies, practices, and programs that ensure fair access to quality for all students in our state."

The ISBE is described by the Illinois state government's website as an agency that "provides leadership and resources to achieve excellence across all Illinois districts..."

== Current members ==
As of January 2025 the membership of the board is:

- Steve Isoye (chair)
- Donna S. Leak (vice chair)
- Sherly Chavarria (secretary)
- James D. Anderson
- Roger L. Eddy
- Anna Grassellino
- Patricia Nugent

== Chairs ==
- Jack Witkowsky
- Lou Mervis (1991–1999)
- Ronald Gidwitz (1999–2003)
- Janet Steiner (2003–2004)
- Jesse Ruiz (2004–2011)
- Gery Chico (2011–2015)
- James Meeks (2015–2019)
- Darren Reisberg (2019–2022)
- Steven Isoye (2022–present)

== See also ==
- Illinois State Superintendent
- Illinois Community College Board — deals with community colleges in Illinois
- Illinois Board of Higher Education — deals with colleges and universities and, since 2012, private business schools and private vocational schools
- Regional office of education
