= Henry Hyde =

American politician (1924–2007)

- Official portrait, 2001

Chair of the House Foreign Affairs Committee
- In office January 3, 2001 – January 3, 2007
- Preceded by: Benjamin Gilman
- Succeeded by: Tom Lantos

Chair of the House Judiciary Committee
- In office January 3, 1995 – January 3, 2001
- Preceded by: Jack Brooks
- Succeeded by: Jim Sensenbrenner

Chair of the House Republican Policy Committee
- In office January 3, 1993 – January 3, 1995
- Leader: Bob Michel
- Preceded by: Mickey Edwards
- Succeeded by: Chris Cox

Member of the U.S. House of Representatives from Illinois's 6th district
- In office January 3, 1975 – January 3, 2007
- Preceded by: Harold R. Collier
- Succeeded by: Peter Roskam

Majority Leader of the Illinois House of Representatives
- In office January 13, 1971 – January 10, 1973
- Preceded by: Lewis V. Morgan
- Succeeded by: William D. Walsh

Member of the Illinois House of Representatives from the 18th district
- In office January 10, 1973 – January 3, 1975 Serving with Lawrence DiPrima, Robert F. McPartlin
- Preceded by: Bernard McDevitt
- Succeeded by: Robert Downs

Member of the Illinois House of Representatives from the 16th district
- In office January 11, 1967 – January 10, 1973 Serving with Hellmut Stolle, William M. Zachacki, Ralph C. Capparelli, Roman Kosinski
- Preceded by: Constituency established
- Succeeded by: Roger McAuliffe

Personal details
- Born: Henry John Hyde; April 18, 1924 Chicago, Illinois, U.S.
- Died: November 29, 2007 (aged 83) Chicago, Illinois, U.S.
- Party: Democratic (before 1952); Republican (1952–2007)
- Spouse(s): Jeanne Simpson (m. 1947; died 1992) Judy Wolverton
- Children: 4
- Education: Duke University; Georgetown University (BA); Loyola University Chicago (JD)

Military service
- Branch/service: United States Navy
- Years of service: 1944–1968
- Rank: Commander
- Unit: United States Navy Reserve
- Hyde's voice Hyde, as chair of the House Judiciary Committee, outlines the Aviation Security and Antiterrorism Act of 1996; Recorded August 2, 1996

Henry John Hyde (April 18, 1924 – November 29, 2007) was an American politician who served as a Republican member of the United States House of Representatives from 1975 to 2007, representing the 6th district of Illinois, an area of Chicago's northwestern suburbs. He was Chairman of the Judiciary Committee from 1995 to 2001, and the House International Relations Committee from 2001 to 2007. Hyde is most famous for being a vocal opponent of abortion; to this end, he was the primary sponsor of the Hyde Amendment, which largely bars the payment of abortions with federal funds.

== Early life and education ==
Hyde was born in Chicago, the son of Monica (Kelly) and Henry Clay Hyde. His father was English and his mother was Irish Catholic. His family supported the Democratic Party. Hyde graduated from St. George High School in 1942. He attended Duke University, where he joined the Sigma Chi fraternity, graduated from Georgetown University and obtained his J.D. degree from Loyola University Chicago School of Law. Hyde played basketball for the Georgetown Hoyas where he helped take the team to the 1943 championship game. He served in the Navy during World War II. He remained in the Naval Reserve from 1946 to 1968, as an officer in charge of the U.S. Naval Intelligence Reserve Unit in Chicago. He retired at the rank of Commander. In 1955, Hyde joined the Knights of Columbus, and was a member of Father McDonald Council 1911 in Elmhurst, Illinois.

He was married to Jeanne Simpson Hyde from 1947 until her death in 1992; he had four children and four grandchildren.

== Political career ==
Hyde's political views began drifting rightward after his collegiate years. By 1952, he had become a Republican and supported Dwight Eisenhower for president. He made his first run for Congress in 1962, losing to Democratic incumbent Roman Pucinski in the 11th District.

Hyde was elected to the Illinois House of Representatives in 1967 and served as Majority Leader from 1971 to 1972. He served in the Illinois House until 1974, when he was elected to the U.S. House of Representatives in November, 1974 as one of the few bright spots in what was a disastrous year for Republicans in the wake of the Watergate scandal. He faced a bruising contest against former Cook County state's attorney Edward Hanrahan, but was elected by 8,000 votes.

=== Political positions and legislation ===
Hyde was one of the most vocal and persistent opponents of abortion in American politics and was the chief sponsor of the eponymous Hyde Amendment to the House Appropriations bill that prohibited the use of federal funds to pay for elective abortions through Medicaid. In 1981, however, he and U.S. Senator Jake Garn of Utah, another abortion opponent, broke with the National Pro-Life Political Action Committee, when its executive director, Peter Gemma, issued a "hit list" to target members of both houses of Congress who supported abortion rights. Hyde said such lists are counterproductive because they create irrevocable discord among legislators, any of whom can be subject to a "single issue" attack of this kind. Gemma said he was surprised by the withdrawal of Garn and Hyde from the PAC committee but continued with plans to spend $650,000 for the 1982 elections on behalf of anti-abortion candidates. In 1993 the 1976 Hyde Amendment law was amended to allow payments for abortions in case of rape, incest, or to save the life of the mother.

An original sponsor of the Brady Bill requiring background checks for gun buyers, Hyde broke with his party in 1994 when he supported a ban on the sale of semi-automatic firearms. An original sponsor of family leave legislation, Hyde said the law promoted "capitalism with a human face." Hyde played a key role in the reauthorization of the Voting Rights Act in 1981.

He was also involved in debates over U.S.-Soviet relations, Central America policy, the War Powers Act, NATO expansion and the investigation of the Iran-Contra affair, and sponsored the United Nations Reform Act of 2005, a bill that ties payment of U.S. dues for United Nations operations to reform of the institution's management.

=== House committees ===
Hyde was a member of the House Judiciary Committee for his entire tenure in the House. He was its chairman from 1995 until 2001, during which time he served as the lead manager during the President Clinton impeachment trial.

From 1985 until 1991, Hyde was the ranking Republican on the House Select Committee on Intelligence. Hyde and the committee's senior Democrat, U.S. Rep. Tom Lantos (D-CA), authored America's worldwide response to the HIV/AIDS crisis in 2003 and landmark foreign assistance legislation creating the Millennium Challenge Corporation and expanding U.S. funding for successful microenterprise initiatives.

=== Savings and Loan scandal ===
In 1981, after leaving the House Banking Committee, Hyde went on the board of directors of Clyde Federal Savings and Loan, whose chairman was one of Hyde's political contributors. According to Salon.com, from 1982 until he left the board in 1984, Hyde used his position on the board of directors to promote the savings and loan's investment in risky financial options. In 1990, the federal government put Clyde in receivership, and paid $67 million to cover insured deposits. In 1993, the Resolution Trust Corporation sued Hyde and other directors for $17.2 million. Four years later, before pretrial investigation and depositions, the government settled with the defendants for $850,000 and made an arrangement exempting Hyde from paying anything. According to Salon.com, Hyde was the only member of the congress sued for "gross negligence" in an S&L failure.

=== Iran–Contra investigation ===
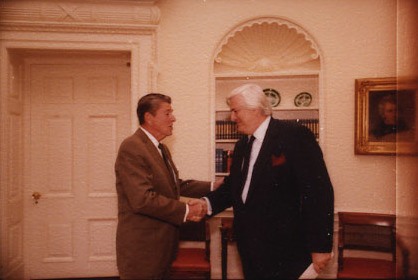
Hyde with President Ronald Reagan in August 1983

As a member of the congressional panel investigating the Iran-Contra affair, Hyde vigorously defended the Ronald Reagan administration, and a number of the participants who had been accused of various crimes, particularly Oliver North. Quoting Thomas Jefferson, Hyde argued that although various individuals had lied in testimony before Congress, their actions were excusable because they were in support of the goal of fighting communism.

=== Clinton impeachment ===
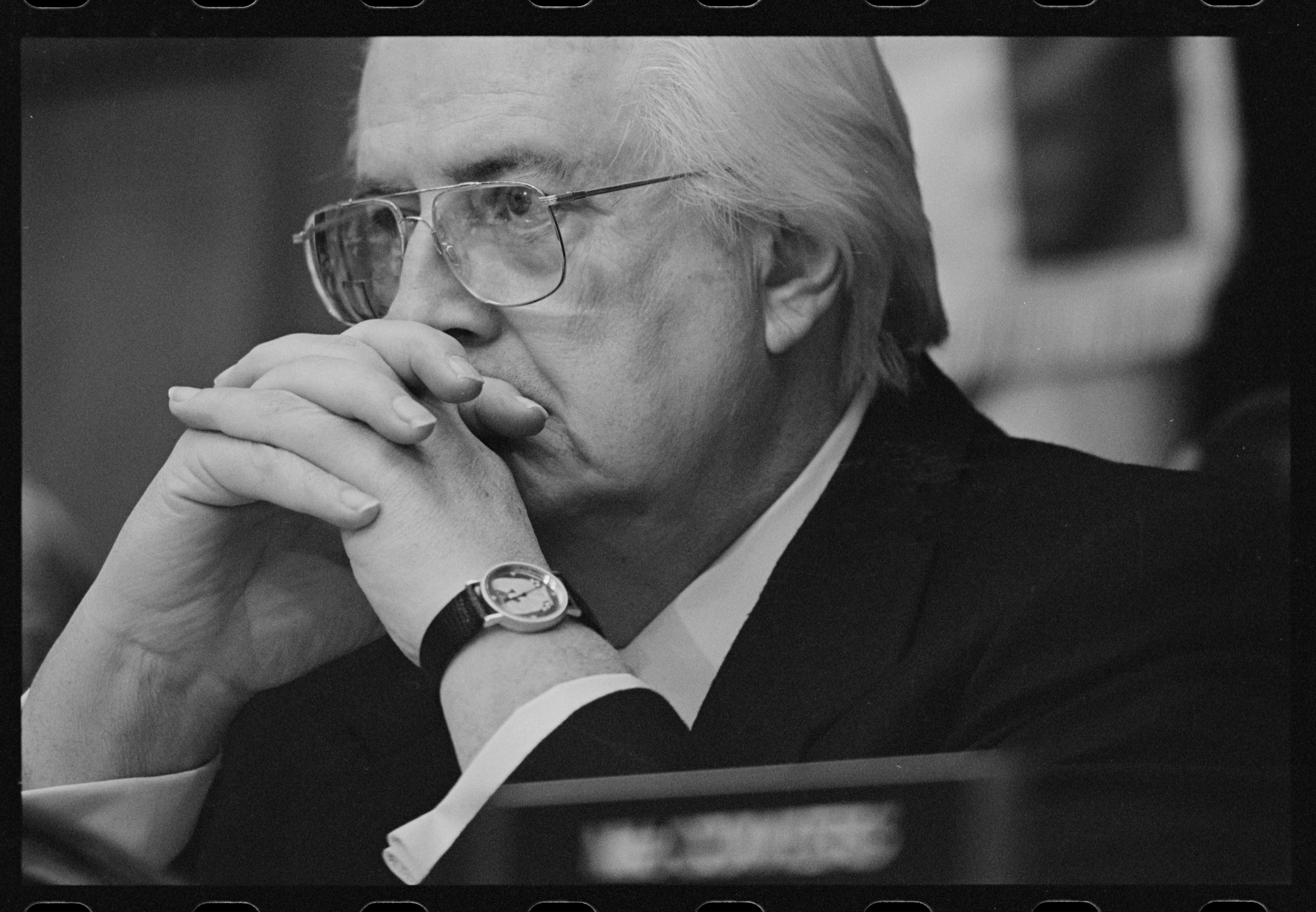
Hyde at a hearing on special counsel Ken Starr's investigation of President Bill Clinton's relationship with Monica Lewinsky, November 1998.

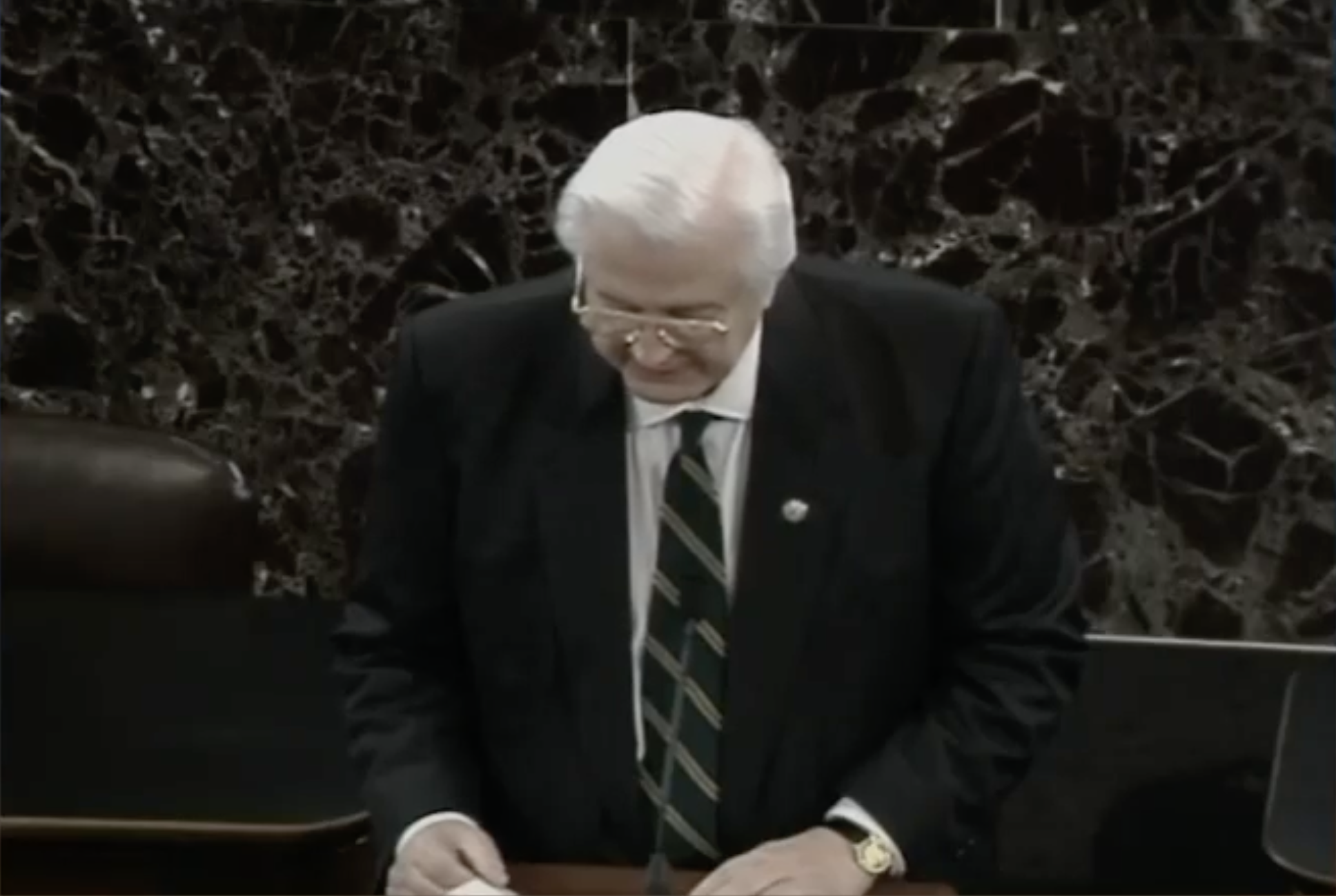
Hyde reads the articles of impeachment to the Senate on January 7, 1999

Hyde argued that the House had a constitutional and civic duty to impeach Bill Clinton for perjury. In the Resolution on Impeachment of the President, Hyde wrote:

What we are telling you today are not the ravings of some vast right-wing conspiracy, but a reaffirmation of a set of values that are tarnished and dim these days, but it is given to us to restore them so our Founding Fathers would be proud. It's your country—the President is our flag bearer, out in front of our people. The flag is falling, my friends—I ask you to catch the falling flag as we keep our appointment with history.

Clinton was impeached by the House on two charges: perjury and obstruction of justice. Hyde served as chief House manager (prosecutor) at the President's trial in the Senate; he became known for his remarks in his closing argument:

A failure to convict will make the statement that lying under oath, while unpleasant and to be avoided, is not all that serious ... We have reduced lying under oath to a breach of etiquette, but only if you are the President ... And now let us all take our place in history on the side of honor, and, oh, yes, let right be done.

Despite Hyde's efforts, President Clinton was acquitted of both perjury and obstruction of justice. With a two-thirds majority required for conviction, only 45 senators voted for conviction on the perjury charge and only 50 on the obstruction of justice charge.

Despite being on opposites sides during the impeachment, Hyde was good friends with representative Barney Frank who praised his efforts to keep the impeachment "personality free".

=== Extramarital affair ===
While Hyde was spearheading the impeachment of President Bill Clinton amid the revelations of the Clinton–Lewinsky affair, it was revealed that Hyde himself had conducted an extramarital sexual affair with a former beauty stylist named Cherie Snodgrass, who was also married. Hyde admitted to the affair and called the relationship a "youthful indiscretion". He was 41 years old and married when the affair occurred. Hyde said the affair ended when Snodgrass' husband confronted Mrs. Hyde. At the time, Snodgrass was 29, also married and had three children.

The Snodgrasses divorced in 1967. The Hydes reconciled and remained married until Mrs. Hyde's death in 1992.

=== 9/11 and the Iraq War ===
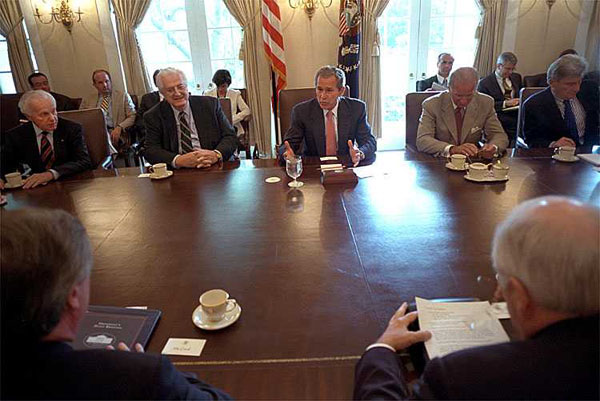
Hyde and other members of Congress meet with President George W. Bush to discuss his trip to the Genoa G-8 Summit in July 2001

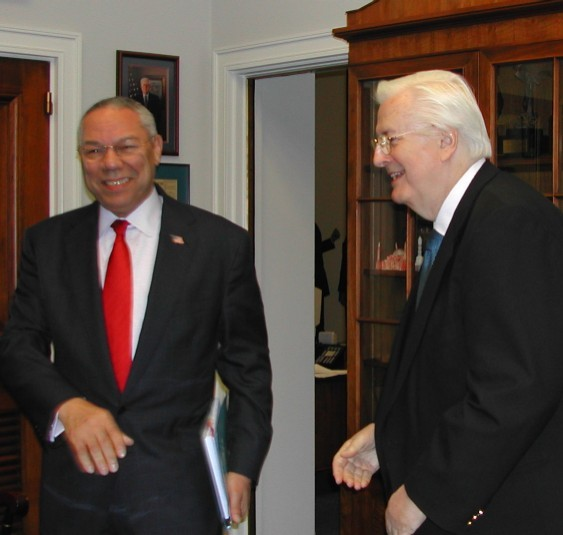
Hyde with Secretary of State Colin Powell to discuss foreign relations, November 2003

As Chairman of the Foreign Relations Committee, Hyde was involved in some of the highest level debates concerning the response to the September 11 attacks in 2001. In the aftermath of the September 11, 2001 attacks, Hyde cautioned against attacking Iraq in the absence of clear evidence of Iraqi complicity, telling CNN's Robert Novak that it "would be a big mistake." One year later, however, he voted in support of the October 10, 2002 House resolution that authorized the president to go to war with Iraq. In response to Rep. Ron Paul's resolution requesting a formal declaration of war, Hyde stated: "There are things in the Constitution that have been overtaken by events, by time. Declaration of war is one of them. ... Inappropriate, anachronistic, it isn't done anymore."

In 2006, Hyde made the following observation in regard to the Bush Administration's proclaimed objective of promoting democracy in the Middle East:

Lashing our interests to the indiscriminate promotion of democracy is a tempting but unwarranted strategy, more a leap of faith than a sober calculation. There are other negative consequences as well. A broad and energetic promotion of democracy in other countries that will not enjoy our long-term and guiding presence may equate not to peace and stability but to revolution.

== Retirement ==
Hyde was reelected 15 times with no substantive opposition. This was mainly because, over time, his district was pushed further into DuPage County, a longstanding bastion of suburban Republicanism. However, by the turn of the century, the demographics of his district shifted, leading his 2004 Democratic challenger Christine Cegelis to garner over 44% of the vote—Hyde's closest race since his initial run for the seat. On April 18, 2005 (his 81st birthday), Hyde announced on his website that he would retire at the expiration of his term (in January 2007). A few days earlier, it had been reported that Illinois Republicans were expecting this announcement, and it was further reported that Illinois State Senator Peter Roskam had emerged as a leading contender for the Republican Party's nomination. In August 2005, Hyde endorsed Roskam as his successor.

=== Order of St. Gregory ===
Hyde was named a Papal Knight of the Order of St. Gregory the Great by Pope Benedict XVI in 2006, in recognition of his longtime support for political issues important to the Roman Catholic Church.

=== Presidential Medal of Freedom ===
Hyde received the Presidential Medal of Freedom, the nation's highest civilian honor, on November 5, 2007, awarded by President Bush. Hyde was hospitalized, recovering from open-heart surgery, and could not attend the ceremony in person.

== Death ==
Hyde died November 29, 2007, nearly eleven months after leaving office, at Rush University Medical Center in Chicago following complications from open heart surgery at Provena Mercy Medical Center in Aurora, Illinois several months earlier. His funeral Mass was presided by Cardinal Francis George of Chicago, and was attended by several dignitaries, including then Speaker of the House Nancy Pelosi and future Speaker of the House John Boehner, at St. John Neumann Catholic Church in Saint Charles, Illinois.

== See also ==
- Hyde Amendment regarding federal payment for abortions
- Hyde Amendment (1997)
- List of federal political sex scandals in the United States

Illinois House of Representatives
Preceded by Lewis V. Morgan	Majority Leader of the Illinois House of Representatives; 1971–1973	Succeeded by William D. Walsh
U.S. House of Representatives
Preceded by Harold R. Collier	Member of the U.S. House of Representatives from Illinois's 6th congressional district 1975–2007	Succeeded by Peter Roskam
Preceded by J. Kenneth Robinson	Ranking Member of the House Intelligence Committee; 1985–1991	Succeeded by Bud Shuster
Preceded by Jack Brooks	Chair of the House Judiciary Committee; 1995–2001	Succeeded by Jim Sensenbrenner
Preceded by Benjamin Gilman	Chair of the House International Relations Committee; 2001–2007	Succeeded by Tom Lantos
Party political offices
Preceded by Mickey Edwards	Chair of the House Republican Policy Committee; 1993–1995	Succeeded by Chris Cox
