= Illinois's 13th House of Representatives district =

American legislative district

Illinois's 13th State House of Representatives district
Representative
Hoan Huynh; D–Chicago
since 2023
- Demographics: 54.2% White; 12.3% Black; 17.5% Hispanic; 12.9% Asian; 0.3% Other; 2.8% Multiracial
- Population (2018): 109,467
- Created: 1983–present 1849–1873, 1957–1973

Illinois's 13th House of Representatives district is a Representative district within the Illinois House of Representatives located in Cook County, Illinois. It has been represented by Democrat Hoan Huynh since January 11, 2023. The district was previously represented by Democrat Greg Harris from 2006 to 2023.

The district includes parts of the Chicago neighborhoods of Edgewater, Lake View, Lincoln Square, North Center, Uptown, West Ridge.

== Representative district history ==
Prior to the ratification of the 1848 Illinois Constitution, counties (or two or more counties) were designated a certain number of Senators and Representatives. With the ratification of the 1848 Illinois Constitution, Legislative and Representative districts were numbered and called by name. Each district was still assigned a certain number of Senators and Representatives. After the passage of the 1872 Apportionment, only Legislative districts were drawn with Representatives elected cumulatively. The 1954 amendment to the 1870 Illinois Constitution established Representative districts as separate from Legislative districts (with representatives still elected cumulatively). The boundaries of Representative and Legislative districts would differ. After the United States Supreme Court ruled in Reynolds v. Sims (1964) that "both houses of state legislatures must be apportioned according to districts of equal population," new districts were redrawn for the Illinois Senate and Illinois House of Representatives. While the Legislative districts were redrawn, the Governor and General Assembly failed to agree on Representative district boundaries. Under the 1954 amendment, "a 10-man bipartisan commission appointed by the governor from recommendations made by both parties" were directed to redraw boundaries but failed to do so in 1963. Because of this failure, and with no district boundaries redrawn, all Representative districts were temporarily merged into one at-large district with 177 representatives (the total number of representatives at the time). The 1964 Illinois House election had several candidates running for all 177 seats throughout the state. In 1965, the Representative districts were redrawn by the Illinois Legislative Reapportionment Commission and elections held in 1966 were done with separate districts. With the 1971 Apportionment (and adoption of the 1970 Illinois Constitution), Representative districts were abolished and representatives were once again elected cumulatively per Legislative district. After the passage of the Cutback Amendment in 1980, the number of Representatives was reduced from 177 to 118 with Representative districts re-established and now electing a single representative.

== Prominent representatives ==
Representative	Notes
William A. J. Sparks	Elected to the U.S. House of Representatives from Illinois's 16th congressional district (1875 – 1883)
Greg Harris	Served as Majority Leader of the Illinois House of Representatives (2019 – 2023)

== List of representatives ==
=== 1849 – 1873 ===
Representative	Party	Years (Note: From 1870 to 1970, the GA met for a new session on the Wednesday after the first Monday of January.)	General Assembly (GA)	Electoral history	Counties represented
13th Representative district established with 1848 Illinois Constitution.
Elisha H. Starkweather	Democratic	January 1, 1849 – January 6, 1851	16th	Redistricted from the Coles County House district and re-elected in 1848; Was not re-elected in 1850.	Clay; Cumberland; Effingham
William H. Blakely	Unknown	January 6, 1851 – January 3, 1853	17th	Elected in 1850; Was not re-elected in 1852.	Clay; Cumberland; Effingham
P. Funkhouser	Democratic	January 3, 1853 – January 1, 1855	18th	Elected back in 1852; Redistricted to the 15th Representative district and re-elected in 1854.	Clay; Cumberland; Effingham
James Bradford	Democratic	January 1, 1855 – January 5, 1857	19th	Elected in 1854; Was not re-elected in 1856.	Bond; Clinton
William A. J. Sparks	Democratic	January 5, 1857 – January 3, 1859	20th	Elected in 1856; Was not re-elected in 1858.	Bond; Clinton
Charles Hoiles	Democratic	January 3, 1859 – January 7, 1861	21st	Elected in 1858; Was not re-elected in 1860.	Bond; Clinton
Joshua P. Knapp	Unknown	January 7, 1861 – January 5, 1863	22nd	Elected in 1860; Was not re-elected in 1862.	Bond; Clinton
Robert H. McCann	Unknown	January 5, 1863 – January 2, 1865	23rd	Elected in 1862; Was not re-elected in 1864.	Effingham; Fayette
George H. Deickman	Democratic	January 2, 1865 – January 7, 1867	24th	Elected in 1864; Was not re-elected in 1866.	Effingham; Fayette
George W. Cornwell	Unknown	January 7, 1867 – January 4, 1869	25th	Elected in 1866; Was not re-elected in 1868.	Effingham; Fayette
Leonard Rush	Democratic	January 4, 1869 – January 4, 1871	26th	Elected in 1868; Was not re-elected in 1870.	Effingham; Fayette
William R. Gass	Republican	January 4, 1871 – January 8, 1873	27th	Elected in 1870; Was not re-elected in 1872.	Perry
District abolished with 1872 Reapportionment as 3 Representatives were now elected cumulatively from Legislative districts.

=== 1957 – 1973 ===
Representative	Party	Party Control	Years (Note: Since 1970, the GA meets on the second Wednesday of January for a new session.)	General Assembly (GA)	Electoral history	Counties represented
District re-established in 1957.
James P. Loukas	Democratic	2 Democrats; 1 Republican	January 9, 1957 – January 6, 1965	70th 71st 72nd 73rd	Elected in 1956; Re-elected in 1958; Re-elected in 1960; Re-elected in 1962; Ran in the At-large district election and won re-election in 1964.	Cook
Nathan J. Kaplan	Democratic	2 Democrats; 1 Republican	January 9, 1957 – January 6, 1965	70th 71st 72nd 73rd	Elected in 1956; Re-elected in 1958; Re-elected in 1960; Re-elected in 1962; Retired.	Cook
Elroy C. Sandquist	Republican	2 Democrats; 1 Republican	January 9, 1957 – January 6, 1965	70th 71st 72nd 73rd	Redistricted from the 25th Legislative district and re-elected in 1956; Re-elected in 1958; Re-elected in 1960; Re-elected in 1962; Ran for Illinois Attorney General and lost in 1964.	Cook
The district was temporarily abolished from 1965 to 1967 due to the Redistricting Commission in 1963 failing to reach an agreement. An at-large election was held electing 177 Representatives from across the state.
William E. Pollack	Republican	2 Republicans; 1 Democrat	January 4, 1967 – March 18, 1968	75th	Redistricted from At-large district and re-elected in 1966; Died while in office on March 18, 1968.	Cook
LaSalle J. Michaels	Democratic	2 Republicans; 1 Democrat	January 4, 1967 – January 8, 1969	75th	Redistricted from At-large district and re-elected in 1966; Retired.	Cook
Elroy C. Sandquist	Republican	2 Republicans; 1 Democrat	January 4, 1967 – January 13, 1971	75th 76th	Elected back in 1966; Re-elected in 1968; Retired.	Cook
1 Vacancy		1 Democrat; 1 Republican	March 18, 1968 – January 8, 1969	75th	Vacancy left unfilled for remainder of the 75th GA.	Cook
Richard Elrod	Democratic	2 Democrats; 1 Republican	January 8, 1969 – January 13, 1971	76th	Elected in 1968; Elected Cook County Sheriff in 1970.	Cook
John B. Brandt	Democratic	2 Democrats; 1 Republican	January 8, 1969 – January 10, 1973	76th 77th	Elected in 1968; Re-elected in 1970; Redistricted to the 14th Legislative district and re-elected in 1972.	Cook
Howard W. Carroll	Democratic	2 Democrats; 1 Republican	January 13, 1971 – January 10, 1973	77th	Elected in 1970; Elected state Senator from the 15th Legislative district in 1972.	Cook
Charles J. Fleck, Jr.	Republican	2 Democrats; 1 Republican	January 13, 1971 – January 10, 1973	77th	Elected in 1970; Redistricted to the 14th Legislative district and re-elected in 1972.	Cook
District abolished with 1971 Reapportionment as Representatives were once again elected from Legislative districts.

=== 1983 – Present ===
Representative	Party	Years	General Assembly (GA)	Electoral history	Counties represented
District re-established with representatives now elected one per district with the passage of the Cutback Amendment
Ralph C. Capparelli	Democratic	January 12, 1983 – January 8, 2003	83rd 84th 85th 86th 87th 88th 89th 90th 91st 92nd	Redistricted from the 16th Legislative district and re-elected in 1982; Re-elected in 1984; Re-elected in 1986; Re-elected in 1988; Re-elected in 1990; Re-elected in 1992; Re-elected in 1994; Re-elected in 1996; Re-elected in 1998; Re-elected in 2000; Redistricted to the 15th Representative district and re-elected in 2002.	Cook
Larry McKeon	Democratic	January 8, 2003 – December 1, 2006	93rd 94th	Redistricted from the 34th Representative district and re-elected in 2002; Re-elected in 2004; Retired before the end of the 94th GA.	Cook
Greg Harris	Democratic	December 1, 2006 – January 11, 2023	94th 95th 96th 97th 98th 99th 100th 101st 102nd	Elected and appointed in 2006; Re-elected in 2008; Re-elected in 2010; Re-elected in 2012; Re-elected in 2014; Re-elected in 2016; Re-elected in 2018; Re-elected in 2020; Retired.	Cook
Hoan Huynh	Democratic	January 11, 2023 – present	103rd	Elected in 2022	Cook

== Historic District Boundaries ==
Years	County	Municipalities/Townships	Notes
2023 – present	Cook	Chicago (Edgewater, Lake View, Lincoln Square, North Center, Uptown, West Ridge)	
2013 – 2023	Cook	Chicago (Albany Park, Edgewater, Lake View, North Center, North Park, Rogers Park, Uptown, West Ridge)	
2003 – 2013	Cook	Chicago	
1993 – 2003	Cook	Chicago	
1983 – 1993	Cook	Chicago	
1967 – 1973	Cook	Chicago	
1957 – 1965	Cook	Chicago	
1871 – 1873	Perry	Barnard, Black Diamond, Calum, Comants, Cowen, Cufler, Denmark, Du Quoin, Four Mile Prairie, Galum, Grand Cote, Iowa, Old Du Quoin, Pinckneyville, St. Johns, Tamaroa,	
1863 – 1871	Effingham; Fayette	Bluff City, Bowling Green, Coal, Cumberland, Edgewood, Effingham, Ewington, Farina, Freemantown, Hickory Creek, Higgins, Howard Point, London City, Mason, Ocanee, Ramsey, Shobonier, Teutopolis, Vandalia, Watson	
1855 – 1863	Bond; Clinton	Aviston, Beaver Creek, Bethel, Breese, Carlyle, Clement, Dry Fork, Dudleyville, Elm Point, Fairview, Greenville, Hanover, Jamestown, Keyesport, Looking Glass, Mulberry Grove, New Berlin, Newport, Pocahontas, Shoal Creek, Trenton, Wertenberg	
1849 – 1855	Clay; Cumberland; Effingham	Cato, Edgewood, Effingham, Ewington, Flora, Freemantown, Greenup, Louisville, Maysville, Tentopolis, Woodbury, Xenia	

== Electoral history ==
=== 2030 – 2022 ===
2022 Illinois House of Representatives election
Party	Candidate	Votes	%	±%
Democratic	Hoan Huynh	36,347	90.49	−9.51%
Republican	Alper Turan	3821	9.51	N/A
Total votes		40,168	100.0	

=== 2020 – 2012 ===
2020 Illinois House of Representatives election
Party	Candidate	Votes	%
Democratic	Greg Harris (incumbent)	46,016	100.0
Total votes		46,016	100.0

2018 Illinois House of Representatives election
Party	Candidate	Votes	%
Democratic	Gregory Harris (incumbent)	39,456	100.0
Total votes		39,456	100.0

2016 Illinois House of Representatives election
Party	Candidate	Votes	%
Democratic	Gregory Harris (incumbent)	40,831	100.0
Total votes		40,831	100.0

2014 Illinois House of Representatives election
Party	Candidate	Votes	%
Democratic	Gregory Harris (incumbent)	22,632	100.0
Total votes		22,632	100.0

2012 Illinois House of Representatives election
Party	Candidate	Votes	%
Democratic	Gregory Harris (incumbent)	33,488	100.0
Total votes		33,488	100.0

=== 2010 – 2002 ===
2010 Illinois House of Representatives election
Party	Candidate	Votes	%
Democratic	Gregory Harris (incumbent)	21,617	100.0
Total votes		21,617	100.0

2008 Illinois House of Representatives election
Party	Candidate	Votes	%
Democratic	Gregory Harris (incumbent)	31,013	100.0
Total votes		31,013	100.0

2006 Illinois House of Representatives election
Party	Candidate	Votes	%
Democratic	Gregory Harris	19,865	100.0
Total votes		19,865	100.0

2004 Illinois House of Representatives election
Party	Candidate	Votes	%	±%
Democratic	Larry McKeon (incumbent)	29,937	100.0	+18.05%
Total votes		29,937	100.0	

2002 Illinois House of Representatives election
Party	Candidate	Votes	%	±%
Democratic	Larry McKeon	17,603	81.95	−18.05%
Republican	Timothy J. Coffey	3,876	18.05	N/A
Total votes		21,479	100.0	

=== 2000 – 1992 ===
2000 Illinois House of Representatives election
Party	Candidate	Votes	%
Democratic	Ralph C. Capparelli (incumbent)	30,058	100.0
Total votes		30,058	100.0

1998 Illinois House of Representatives election
Party	Candidate	Votes	%	±%
Democratic	Ralph C. Capparelli (incumbent)	24,743	100.0	+41.48%
Total votes		24,743	100.0	

1996 Illinois House of Representatives election
Party	Candidate	Votes	%	±%
Democratic	Ralph C. Capparelli (incumbent)	23,888	58.52	+1.92%
Republican	Peter Callaghan	16,932	41.48	−1.92%
Total votes		40,820	100.0	

1994 Illinois House of Representatives election
Party	Candidate	Votes	%	±%
Democratic	Ralph C. Capparelli (incumbent)	18,262	56.60	+0.81%
Republican	Daniel J. Staackmann	14,004	43.40	−0.81%
Total votes		32,266	100.0	

1992 Illinois House of Representatives election
Party	Candidate	Votes	%	±%
Democratic	Ralph C. Capparelli (incumbent)	26,693	55.79	−3.19%
Republican	Josef Matuschka	21,154	44.21	+3.19%
Total votes		47,847	100.0	

=== 1990 – 1982 ===
1990 Illinois House of Representatives election
Party	Candidate	Votes	%	±%
Democratic	Ralph C. Capparelli (incumbent)	21,497	58.98	−2.70%
Republican	Josef Matuschka	14,950	41.02	+2.70%
Total votes		36,447	100.0	

1988 Illinois House of Representatives election
Party	Candidate	Votes	%	±%
Democratic	Ralph C. Capparelli (incumbent)	29,731	61.68	−2.16%
Republican	Kevin F. Alexander	18,470	38.32	+2.16%
Total votes		47,841	100.0	

1986 Illinois House of Representatives election
Party	Candidate	Votes	%	±%
Democratic	Ralph C. Capparelli (incumbent)	24,804	63.84	+6.75%
Republican	Carol Panek	14,047	36.16	−6.75%
Total votes		38,851	100.0	

1984 Illinois House of Representatives election
Party	Candidate	Votes	%	±%
Democratic	Ralph C. Capparelli (incumbent)	28,566	57.09	−8.07%
Republican	John P. Forde	21,470	42.91	+8.07%
Total votes		50,036	100.0	

1982 Illinois House of Representatives election
Party	Candidate	Votes	%
Democratic	Ralph C. Capparelli	26,659	65.16
Republican	Joseph S. Zukowski	14,256	34.84
Total votes		40,915	100.0

=== 1970 – 1962 ===
1970 Illinois House of Representatives election
Party	Candidate	Votes	%
Democratic	John B. Brandt (incumbent)	59,809.5	37.43
Democratic	Howard W. Carroll	51,193.5	32.04
Republican	Charles J. Fleck, Jr.	48,766.5	30.53
Write-in		1.5	0.00
Total votes		159,771	100.0

1968 Illinois House of Representatives election
Party	Candidate	Votes	%
Democratic	Richard J. Elrod	64,302.5	30.47
Democratic	John B. Brandt	58,387	27.67
Republican	Elroy C. Sandquist (incumbent)	44,485.5	21.08
Republican	Thomas Lima	43,832	20.77
Total votes		211,007	100.0

1966 Illinois House of Representatives election
Party	Candidate	Votes	%
Republican	William E. Pollack	51,299.5	26.15
Democratic	La Salle J. DeMichaels	50,608.5	25.80
Republican	Elroy C. Sandquist	47,559.5	24.25
Democratic	Joseph F. Fanta	46,686.5	23.80
Total votes		196,154	100.0

1962 Illinois House of Representatives election
Party	Candidate	Votes	%
Democratic	James P. Loukas (incumbent)	52,546.5	27.13
Democratic	Nathan J. Kaplan (incumbent)	51,684	26.68
Republican	Elroy C. Sandquist (incumbent)	49,253.5	25.43
Republican	Albert E. Bennett	40,208.5	20.76
Total votes		193,692.5	100.0

=== 1960 – 1956 ===
1960 Illinois House of Representatives election
Party	Candidate	Votes	%
Republican	Elroy C. Sandquist (incumbent)	88,698	40.23
Democratic	James P. Loukas (incumbent)	66,154.5	30.01
Democratic	Nathan J. Kaplan (incumbent)	65,610	29.76
Total votes		220,462.5	100.0

1958 Illinois House of Representatives election
Party	Candidate	Votes	%
Democratic	James P. Loukas (incumbent)	55,959.5	32.74
Democratic	Nathan J. Kaplan (incumbent)	53,362	31.22
Republican	Elroy C. Sandquist (incumbent)	35,303	20.65
Republican	Joseph Kaplan	26,299	15.39
Total votes		170,923.5	100.0

1956 Illinois House of Representatives election
Party	Candidate	Votes	%
Democratic	James P. Loukas (incumbent)	63,012	27.26
Democratic	Nathan J. Kaplan (incumbent)	59,829.5	25.88
Republican	Elroy C. Sandquist (incumbent)	56,277.5	24.34
Republican	S. S. Schiller	52,057	22.52
Total votes		231,176	100.0
