= Adam Langer =

American author (born 1967)

- Born: 1967 (age 58–59); Chicago, Illinois, U.S.
- Education: Vassar College
- Occupations: Novelist; short story writer; playwright; journalist
- Spouse: Beate Sissenich
- Writing career
- Subject: Fiction
- Notable work: Crossing California
- Website: www.adamlanger.com

Adam Langer (born 1967) is an American author best known for his novel Crossing California, which was published in 2004.

== Biography ==
Langer grew up in the West Rogers Park neighborhood of Chicago, where he attended Daniel Boone Elementary School. He attended Evanston Township High School from 1980 to 1984 and graduated from Vassar College in 1988. Returning to Chicago, he worked for a little over a decade as an editor, nonfiction author, playwright, theater director, and film producer. In 2000, he won a fellowship to Columbia University's National Arts Journalism Program and remained in New York as a senior editor of Book Magazine until it folded in 2003. He had a weekly column in The Book Standard.

In August 2012, he was named Arts Editor of The Jewish Daily Forward.

== Works ==
=== Novels ===
- Crossing California (2004)
- The Washington Story (2005)
- Ellington Boulevard (2008)
- My Father's Bonus March (2009)
- The Thieves of Manhattan (2010)
- The Salinger Contract (2013)
- Cyclorama (2022)
