= Demi Palecek =

American politician

Member-elect of the Illinois House of Representatives from the 13th district
- Assuming office January 2027
- Succeeding: Hoan Huynh

Personal details
- Party: Democratic

Demi Palecek is an American politician. A member of the Democratic Party, she is the member-elect for the 13th district of the Illinois House of Representatives.
