= Hoan Huynh =

American politician

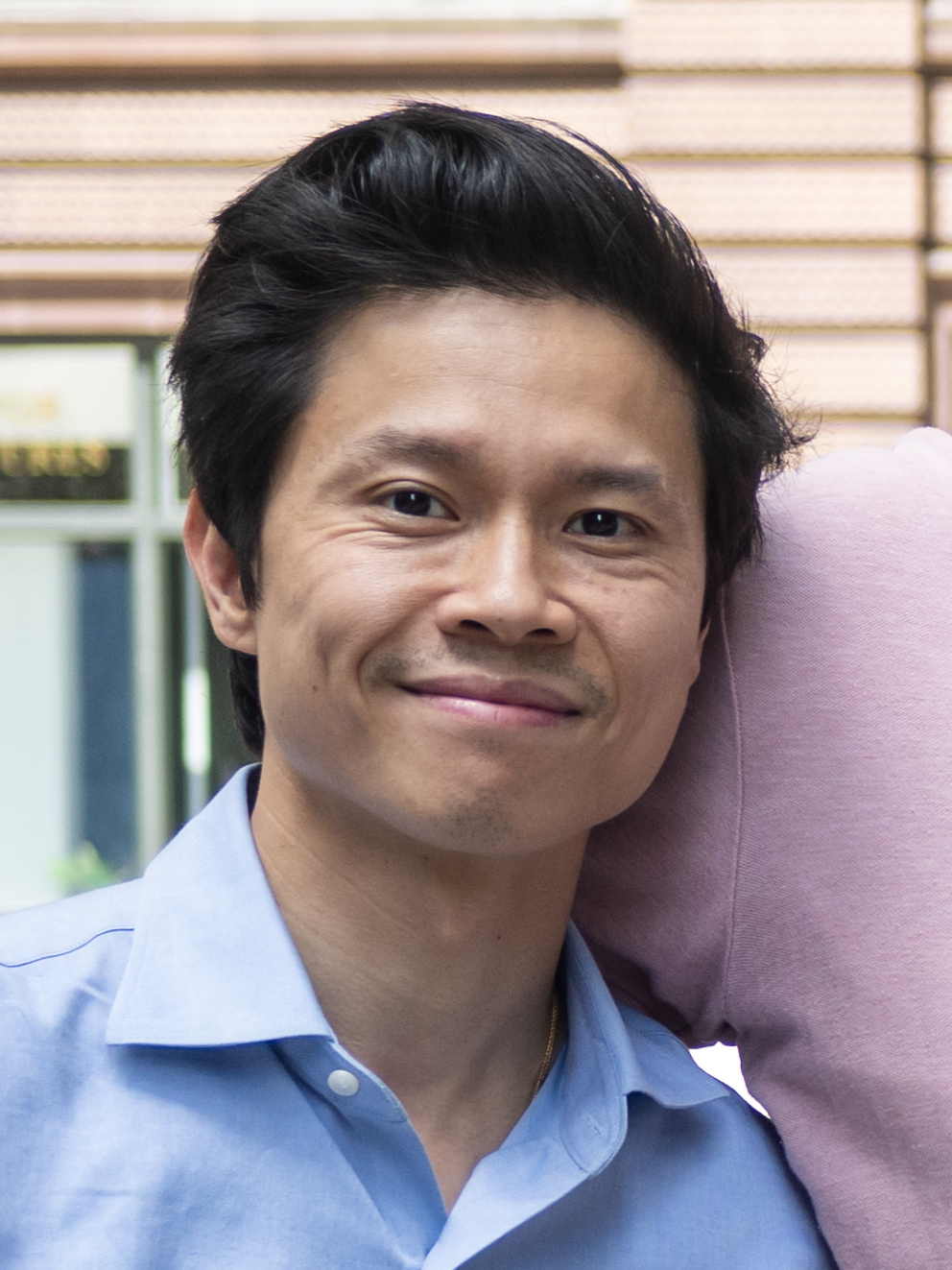
- Huynh in 2025

Member of the Illinois House of Representatives from the 13th district
- Incumbent
- Assumed office January 11, 2023
- Preceded by: Greg Harris
- Succeeded by: Demi Palecek (elect)

Personal details
- Born: 1990 (age 35–36) Vietnam
- Party: Democratic
- Education: Yale University (BA); King's College, Cambridge; Harvard University (MPP); University of Chicago

Hoan Huynh (born 1990) is an American politician and Democratic member of the Illinois House of Representatives. Huynh has represented the 13th district since January 11, 2023. He is the first Vietnamese American to serve in the Illinois General Assembly.

== Early life and education ==
Huynh was born in Vietnam to Vietnamese Chinese parents. His family, members of which fought for South Vietnam during the Vietnam War, were granted asylum in the United States in the early 1990s and lived in southern California. He attended Yale University for a bachelor's in sociology with concentrations in economics and anthropology in 2012, then studied for a year at King's College, Cambridge, followed by a master's in policy from Harvard University in 2014, and further graduate coursework at the University of Chicago.

== Electoral history ==
In the 2022 general election, Huynh defeated Republican candidate Alper Turan with 36,347 votes to Turan's 3,821 votes. Huynh was re-elected in the 2024 general election, with 46,432 votes; his Republican opponent, Terry Nguyen Le, received 6,510 votes.

In 2024, Huynh ran for one of seven delegate seats to the Democratic Party's National Nominating Convention for Illinois's ninth Congressional District.

In 2025, Huynh announced his intention to run for the Democratic primary for the ninth Congressional district's seat in the U.S. House of Representatives.

== Illinois House of Representatives ==
On October 21, 2025, Huynh was stopped by US Customs and Border Patrol agents in Albany Park, a neighborhood in his district, while alerting neighbors to the presence of US Immigration and Customs Enforcement in the area. Huynh released video taken by his staff of his car being surrounded by agents, one of whom Huynh alleged aimed their gun at him.

== Electoral results ==
2026 U.S. House of Representatives, Illinois's 9th Congressional District - Democratic primary results
Party	Candidate	Votes	%
Democratic	Daniel Biss	36,690	29.5
Democratic	Kat Abughazaleh	32,233	26.0
Democratic	Laura Fine	25,262	20.3
Democratic	Mike Simmons	8,647	7.0
Democratic	Phil Andrew	7,709	6.2
Democratic	Bushra Amiwala	6,240	5.0
Democratic	Hoan Huynh	2,174	1.8
Democratic	Patricia Brown	1,600	1.3
Democratic	Jeff Cohen	1,041	0.8
Democratic	Justin Ford	748	0.6
Democratic	Bethany Johnson	613	0.5
Democratic	Sam Polan	508	0.4
Democratic	Howard Rosenblum	296	0.2
Democratic	Nick Pyati	227	0.2
Democratic	Mark Fredrickson	213	0.2
Total votes		124,201	100.0
