= Peterson/Ridge station =

Commuter rail station in Chicago, Illinois

Peterson/Ridge

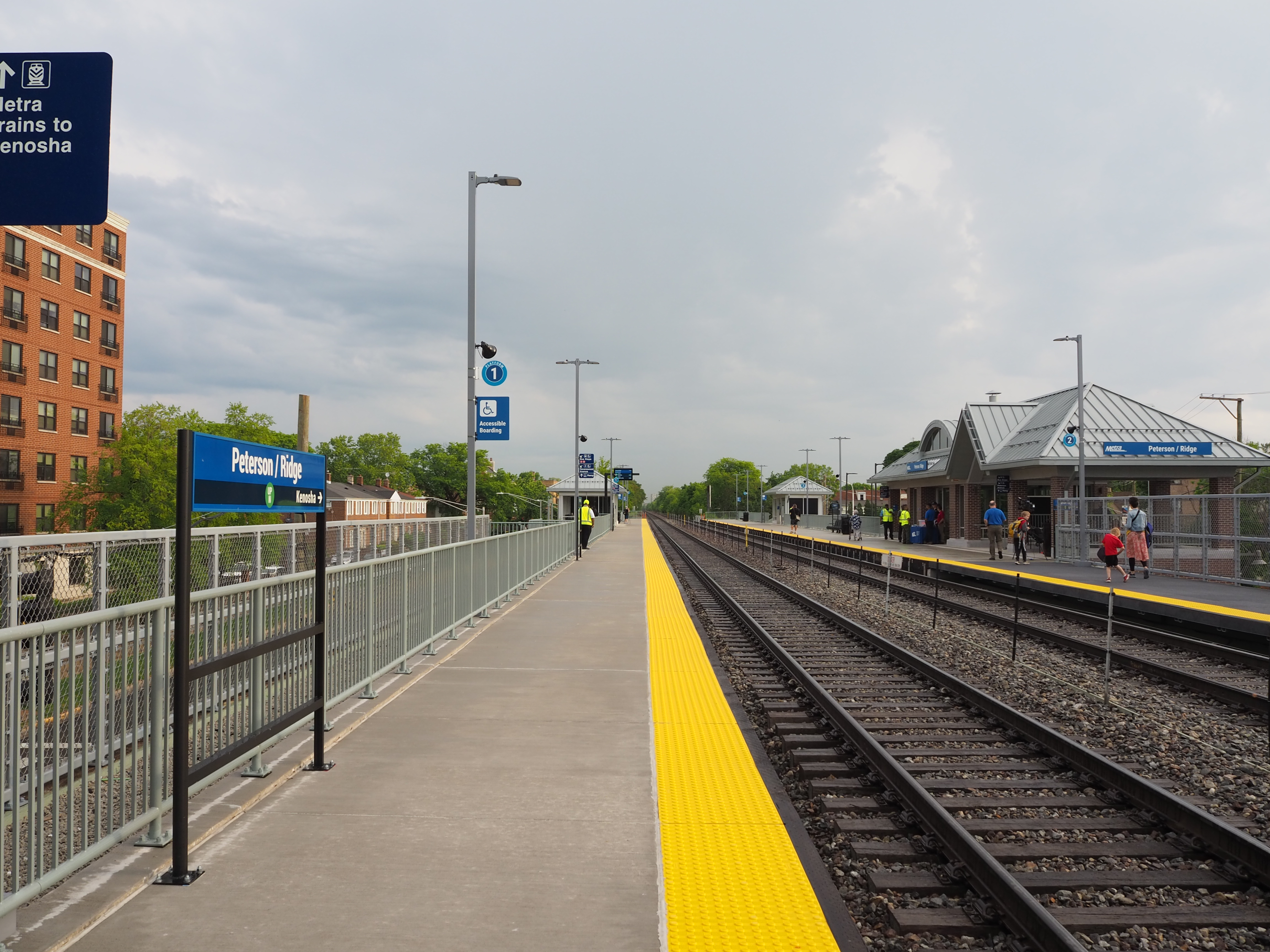
- Peterson/Ridge platforms on opening day

General information
- Location: 1780 West Peterson Avenue; Chicago, Illinois 60660
- Coordinates: 41.991484°N 87.67489°W
- Owner: Metra
- Platforms: 2 side platforms
- Tracks: 2

Construction
- Parking: Yes
- Cycle facilities: Yes
- Accessible: Yes

Other information
- Fare zone: 2

History
- Opened: May 20, 2024

Services
Preceding station	Metra	Following station
Rogers Park toward Kenosha	Union Pacific North	Ravenswood toward Ogilvie TC
Track layout
Location

Peterson/Ridge station is a railroad station on the North Side of Chicago serving Metra's Union Pacific North Line. It is at the intersection of West Peterson Avenue and North Ravenswood Avenue, near Ridge Avenue, in Chicago's Edgewater community area. A groundbreaking ceremony for construction was held on November 1, 2021. Construction concluded and the station opened on May 20, 2024.

As of September 20, 2025, Peterson/Ridge is served by all 71 trains (35 inbound, 36 outbound) on weekdays, and by all 30 trains (15 in each direction) on weekends and holidays. During the summer concert season, an extra outbound train to Ravinia Park station serves Peterson/Ridge station on weekends.

== History ==
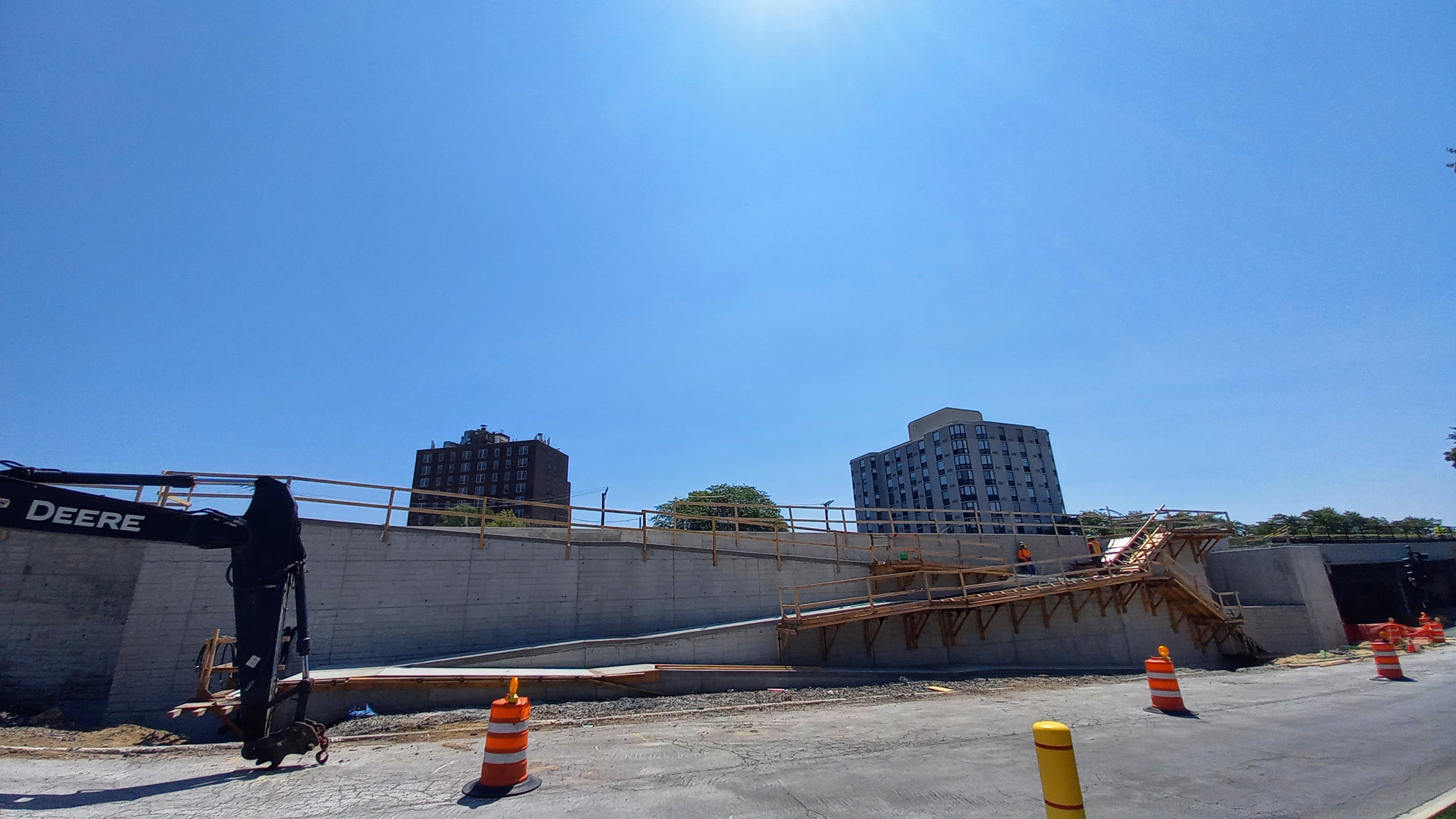
Peterson/Ridge station during construction in July 2023

There were originally three stations serving Edgewater as well as either Lincoln Square or West Ridge: Summerdale station, Rose Hill station, and Kenmore station. In 1958, the Chicago and North Western Railway, the sole operator at the time, closed numerous stations on the Milwaukee Division, including the three aforementioned stations, to speed up service between Chicago and the north suburbs.

An infill station in Edgewater was proposed as early as 2013 to address growing demand in the area, but funding issues led to a years-long delay. Metra eventually received $15 million in funding in 2019 to begin construction on the new station. However, construction began in November 2021, two years after receiving funding. One reason for the delay was the objection from the Chicago Department of Water Management. The department feared that the permeable pavement would overwhelm the existing sewer system in the area.

== Bus connections ==
CTA

- 84 Peterson
