= Damen station (CTA Brown Line) =

Chicago "L" station

Damen 2000W 4700N
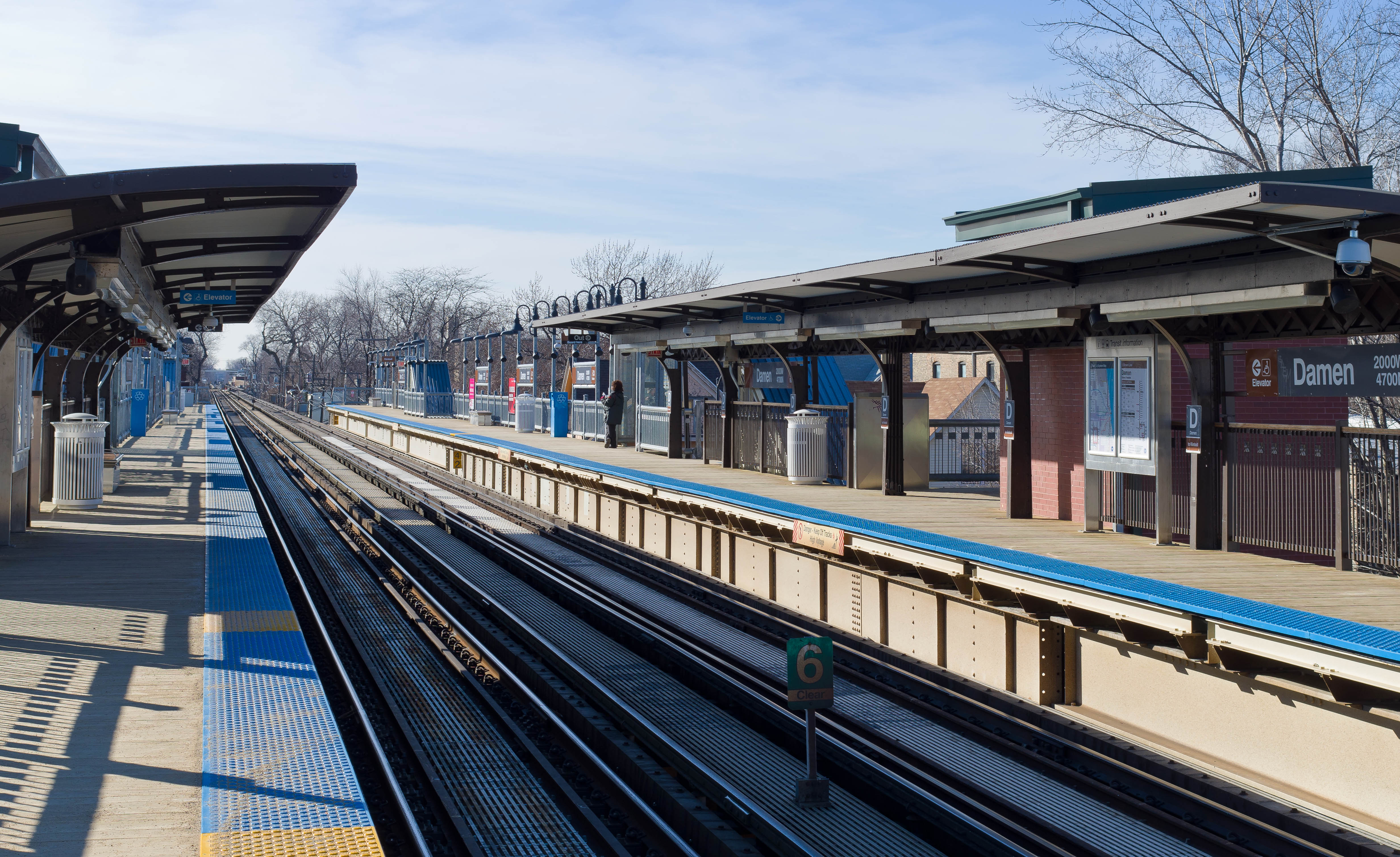

General information
- Location: 4643–47 North Damen Avenue; Chicago, Illinois 60640
- Coordinates: 41.966398°N 87.679004°W
- Owner: Chicago Transit Authority
- Line: Ravenswood Branch
- Platforms: 2 Side platforms
- Tracks: 2
- Connections: at Ravenswood; CTA Buses

Construction
- Structure type: Elevated
- Cycle facilities: Yes
- Accessible: Yes

History
- Opened: May 8, 1907; 119 years ago
- Rebuilt: 2007–2008; 18 years ago
- Former names: Robey Street

Passengers
- 2025: 512,459 ▲2.1%

Services
Preceding station	Chicago "L"	Following station
Western toward Kimball	Brown Line	Montrose toward Loop (Washington/Wells)
Former services
Preceding station	Chicago "L"	Following station
Western toward Kimball	Ravenswood branch	Ravenswood Closed 1949 toward Belmont
Track layout
Location

Damen is an 'L' station on the CTA's Brown Line. It is an elevated station with two side platforms, located at 4643–47 North Damen Avenue in Chicago's Ravenswood neighborhood. The adjacent stations are Western, which is located about one half mile (0.8 km) to the west, and Montrose, about one half mile (0.8 km) to the southeast. Located three blocks east is the Ravenswood Metra station on the commuter railroad's Union Pacific North Line.

== History ==
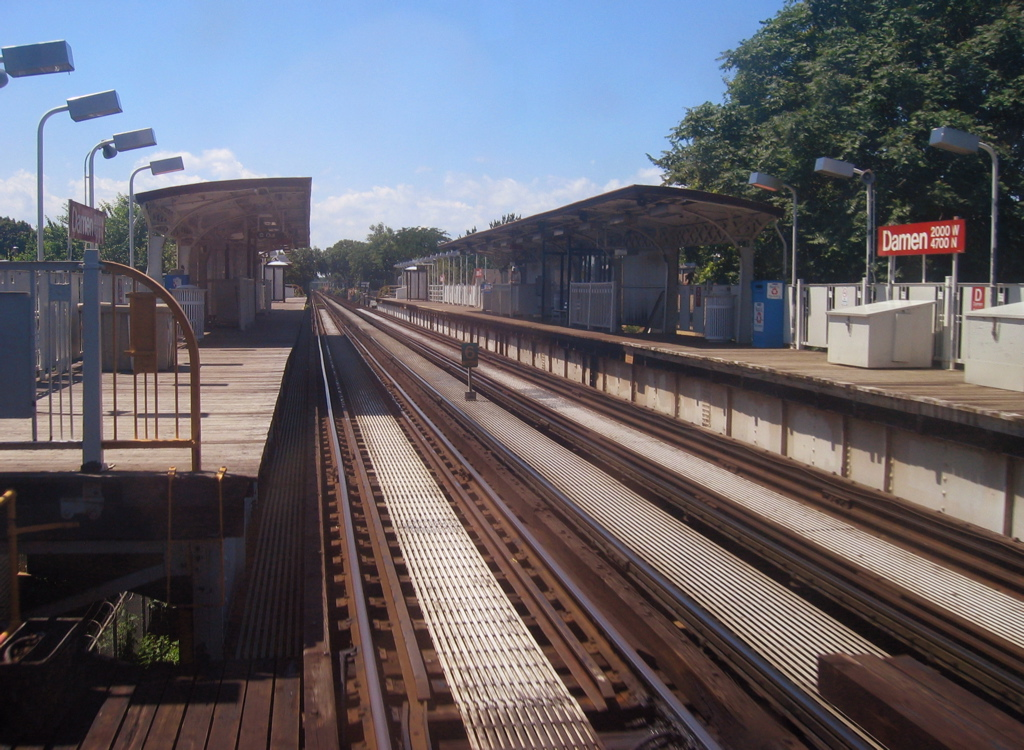
The station before reconstruction, July 2006

Damen Station opened in 1907 as part of Northwestern Elevated Railroad's Ravenswood line. The station was originally named Robey for the original name of the street on which it is located. During CTA's AB-Skip-Stop Service on the Brown Line, from 1949 to 1995, Damen was an "A" station.

=== Brown Line Capacity Expansion Project ===
The Brown Line Capacity Expansion Project extended the platforms of all Brown Line stations to allow eight car trains and upgraded all Brown Line stations to be accessible to passengers with disabilities. On November 26, 2007, Damen Station closed for twelve months to be rebuilt as part of this project. It retained many of its historic features during reconstruction, however, and reopened on December 19, 2008.

== Bus and rail connections ==
CTA

- 50 Damen

Metra

- Ravenswood (Metra)
