= United Nations Reform Act of 2005 =

Proposed United States legislation

On June 17, 2005, the United States House of Representatives passed H.R. 2745, a bill to cut funds to the United Nations in half by 2008 if it did not meet certain criteria laid out in the legislation. The United States is estimated to contribute about 22% of the UN's yearly budget—this bill would have had a large impact on the UN. The George W. Bush administration and several former US ambassadors to the UN warned that it would have strengthened anti-American sentiment around the world and would have hurt UN reform movements.

It failed to pass Congress.

The author of the bill was House International Relations Committee Chairman Henry Hyde, a Republican from Illinois. It was approved by the House in a vote of 221–184. Supporters of the bill claim that more passive efforts to reform the UN have failed in the past, and it is now time to try a technique that shows the United States has "some teeth in reform."
