= Rose Hill station =

Railway station in the United States

Rose Hill
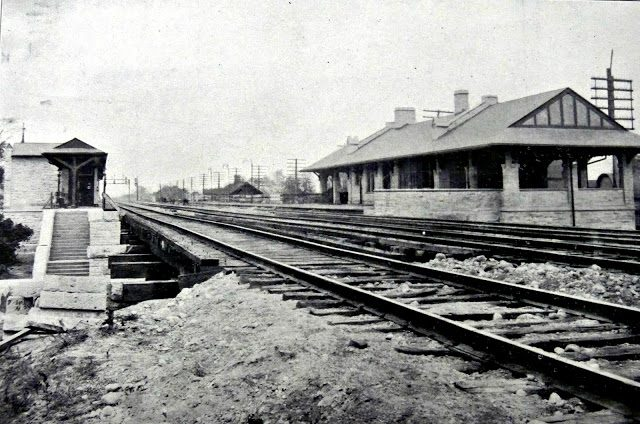

General information
- Location: Rosehill Drive and Ravenswood Avenue; Chicago, Illinois 60640
- Coordinates: 41.9868°N 87.6749°W
- Line: Kenosha Subdivision
- Platforms: 2 side platforms
- Tracks: 3

History
- Opened: 1855–1856
- Closed: December 1, 1958
- Rebuilt: 1908/1909
- Former names: Chittenden

Services
Preceding station	Chicago and North Western Railway	Following station
Kenmore toward Milwaukee	Milwaukee Division	Summerdale toward Chicago
Track layout
Location

Rose Hill was a commuter railroad station on the Chicago and North Western Railway's Milwaukee Division, now the Union Pacific North Line. The station was located at Rosehill Drive and Ravenswood Avenue, in Chicago's Edgewater neighborhood. Rose Hill opened in 1855 or 1856, and was in service for more than 100 years before closing in 1958 as part of a service revision on the North Western's commuter lines.

== History ==
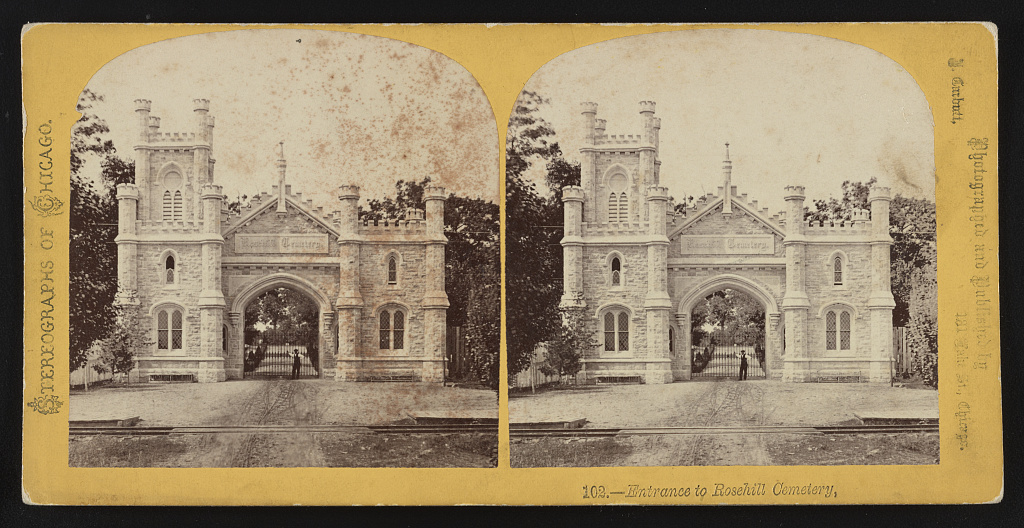
Stereo card view of the entrance to Rosehill Cemetery with the Chicago and Milwaukee Railroad line in front. The station's platform, seen on the west side of the line, allowed for the passage of Rosehill Drive.

The station that would come to be known as Rose Hill opened as a stop on the Chicago and Milwaukee Railroad, a line which officially began operating January 1, 1855, and ran from Chicago to north-suburban Waukegan. The Wisconsin portion of the line opened in June, providing a connection between its namesake cities. Rose Hill was one of the earlier stops on the line, opening in 1855 or 1856, as Chittenden, named for the town of Chittenden which the station served. At the time, Chittenden was part of the civil township of Lake View, the line had but a single track running at grade, and this was the first stop outside of the Chicago city limits. Trains stopped at a pair of platforms on the west side of the track which were separated from each other by a gap permitting the passage of the unpaved Rosehill Drive. On September 16, 1857, an auction was held at the station for one hundred fifty Chittenden lots. Those buying lots were given free transport to and from the sale and "provided with a good dinner." The winner that day was the Rosehill Cemetery Company which acquired all one hundred and fifty lots. Not long afterward, the new cemetery was constructed immediately west of the Chittenden stop. Rosehill Cemetery opened on July 29, 1859, and the station's name was changed to match, inconsistently using the variants "Rose Hill" and "Rosehill."

In May 1866, the Chicago and Milwaukee was leased in perpetuity to the Chicago and North Western Railway with the Chicago–Milwaukee line becoming the Chicago and North Western's Milwaukee Division.

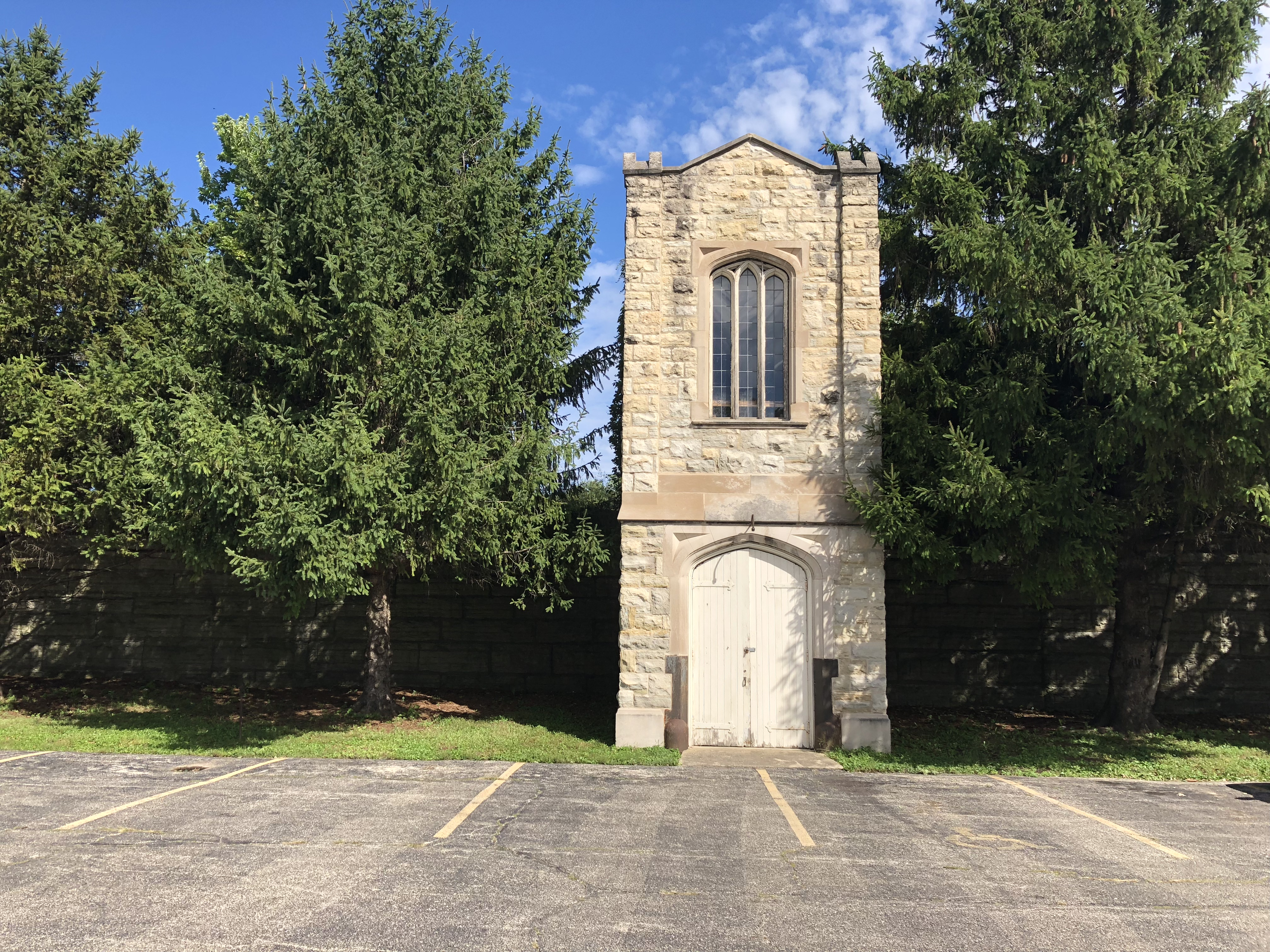
Rose Hill's Castellated Gothic casket elevator tower seen from inside Rosehill Cemetery in 2018

On July 15, 1889, Lake View was annexed by the city of Chicago and in 1896 and 1903, the city of Chicago passed ordinances requiring the elevation of the line. It wasn't until 1908 or 1909 that the elevation was completed to Evanston. When the line was elevated, a new station was constructed using stone to match the Castellated Gothic Rosehill Cemetery Administration Building and Entry Gate which was immediately west of the station. The station building was situated at track-level on the east side of the tracks. Passengers and mourners boarded and alighted at a pair of side platforms serving the outer two tracks while a through track ran down the center. Access to the street was by a pair of stairways on the east and west sides of the embankment which led down to the north side of Rosehill Drive. An elevator, executed in the same Castellated Gothic style, was provided on the western (northbound) platform to allow for pallbearers on funeral trains to easily bring coffins down to ground level for interment.

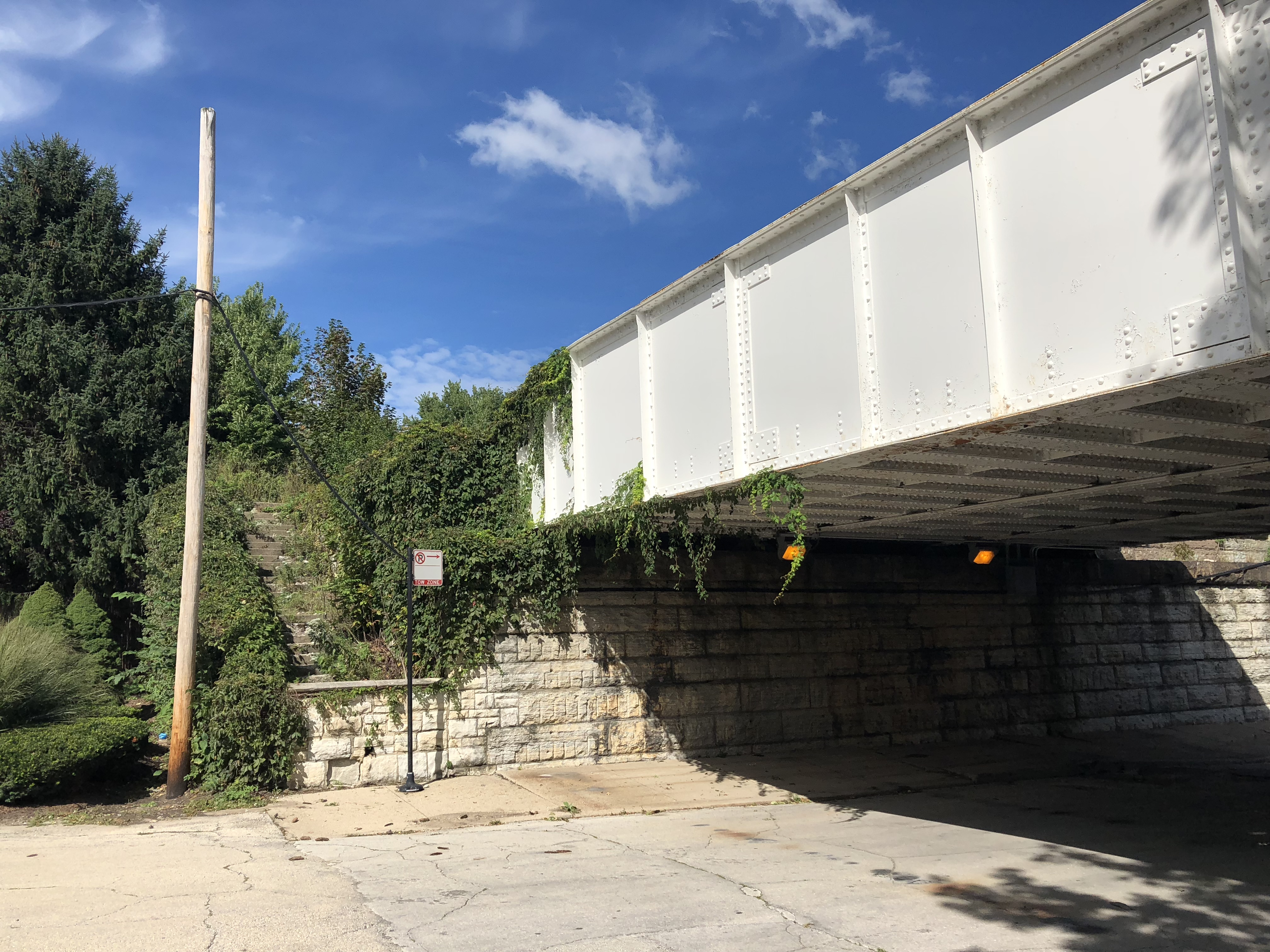
Blocked off stairway leading to the Rose Hill northbound platform after almost sixty years of abandonment

By the 1950s, Chicago and North Western management began to reassess its commuter service and came to the conclusion that the road could be operated more economically and efficiently by closing stations in and near Chicago and focusing on suburban and long-haul traffic. In June 1958, the company went before the Illinois Commerce Commission requesting permission to abandon more than twenty stops, alter train schedules, revise its ticketing structure, and raise fares on monthly tickets. On November 14, the ICC ruled in favor of granting the majority of the North Western's requests, including the closure of the Rose Hill station. The fare increase and service alterations went into effect on December 1, 1958, and Rose Hill was abandoned along with twenty other stations either in or near Chicago on the Milwaukee, Geneva, and Wisconsin Divisions.

== See also ==
- Peterson/Ridge station, a nearby commuter rail station that opened in 2024.
