= Kenmore station (Illinois) =

Defunct commuter railroad station

Kenmore

General information
- Location: Granville Avenue and Ravenswood Avenue; Chicago, Illinois 60640
- Coordinates: 41.9947°N 87.6750°W
- Line: Milwaukee Division
- Platforms: 2 side platforms
- Tracks: 2

History
- Closed: December 1, 1958
- Former names: High Ridge

Services
Preceding station	Chicago and North Western Railway	Following station
Rogers Park toward Milwaukee	Milwaukee Division	Rose Hill toward Chicago
Location

Kenmore was a commuter railroad station on the Chicago and North Western Railway's Milwaukee Division, now the Union Pacific North Line. The station was located on Ravenswood Avenue between Granville and Thome Avenues, in Chicago's Edgewater neighborhood. Kenmore opened in 1887 or 1888, and closed on December 1, 1958, as part of an effort by the Chicago and North Western to close twenty two stations within the city of Chicago and the close-in suburbs.

== History ==
As constructed, the line through Chicago, Lake View Township, and the village of Rogers Park was at grade level. On July 15, 1889, Lake View was annexed by the city of Chicago and in 1896 and 1903, the city of Chicago passed ordinances requiring the elevation of the line. It wasn't until 1908 or 1909 that the elevation was completed to Evanston. During this period, Kenmore was rebuilt onto the line's solid-fill embankment.

By the 1950s, Chicago and North Western management began to reassess its commuter service and came to the conclusion that the road could be operated more economically and efficiently by closing stations in and near Chicago and focusing on suburban and long-haul traffic. In June 1958, the company went before the Illinois Commerce Commission requesting permission to abandon more than twenty stops, alter train schedules, revise its ticketing structure, and raise fares on monthly tickets. On November 14, the ICC ruled in favor of granting the majority of the North Western's requests, including the closure of the Kenmore station. The fare increase and service alterations went into effect on December 1, 1958, and Kenmore was abandoned along with twenty one other stations either in or near Chicago on the Milwaukee, Geneva, and Wisconsin Divisions.

== See also ==
- Peterson/Ridge station, a nearby commuter rail station that opened in 2024.
