= Ravenswood station =

Commuter rail station in Chicago, Illinois

Ravenswood

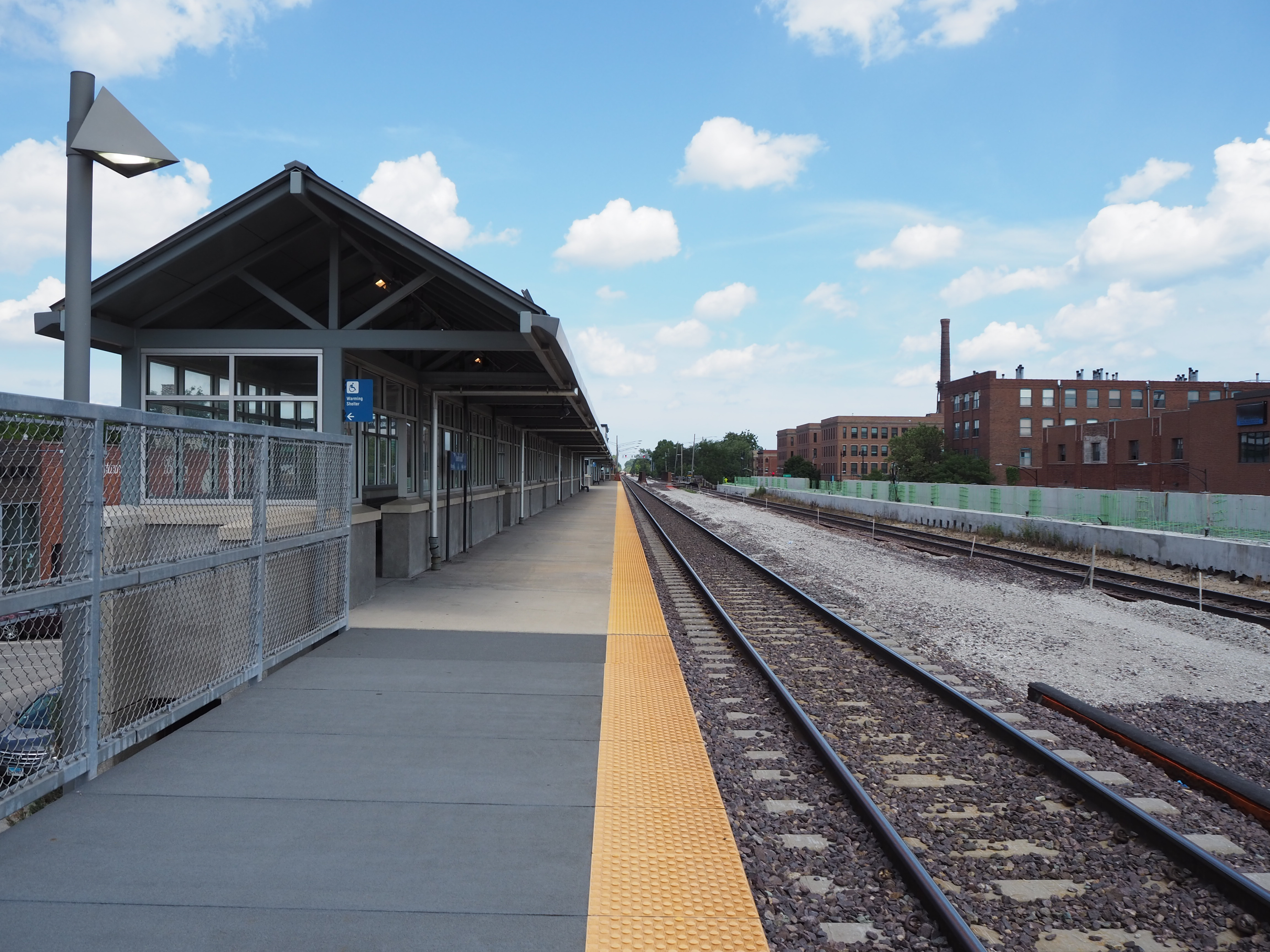

General information
- Location: 4800 North Ravenswood Avenue; Chicago, Illinois 60640
- Coordinates: 41.9684°N 87.6743°W
- Owner: Metra
- Platforms: 2 side platforms
- Tracks: 2
- Connections: Brown at Damen; CTA Buses

Construction
- Accessible: Yes

Other information
- Fare zone: 2

History
- Opened: 1963 (Current station)
- Rebuilt: 1970, 2012–2023

Passengers
- October 2025: 1,650 (average weekday)
- Rank: 3 out of 236

Services
Preceding station	Metra	Following station
Peterson/Ridge toward Kenosha	Union Pacific North	Clybourn toward Ogilvie TC
Track layout
Location

Ravenswood is a railroad station on the North Side of Chicago serving Metra's Union Pacific North Line. It is located at 4800 North Ravenswood Avenue, just south of West Lawrence Avenue. A previous Ravenswood station was located at Wilson Avenue, but was replaced with the station at the current location, opposite the Chicago and North Western Railway's Ravenswood Accounting Office & Carload Tracing Bureau, which were housed in a building at 4801 North Ravenswood Avenue. In Metra's zone-based fare system, Ravenswood is in zone 2. As of October 2025, Ravenswood is the third busiest of Metra's 236 non-downtown stations, with an average of 1,650 weekday boardings. Ravenswood station is near the eastern edge of the Chicago neighborhood also known as Ravenswood and the western edge of Uptown.

The station consists of two side platforms, and does not contain a ticket agent booth. Northbound trains stop on the west platform and southbound trains stop on the east platform. Trains go south to Ogilvie Transportation Center and as far north as Kenosha, Wisconsin. It is the busiest station on the UP North Line and was rebuilt starting in the fall of 2010 as part of a project that included replacing 12 bridges along this line. The new station was expected to be completed by May 2014, but was completed in 2023.

The Lawrence Avenue entrance to the east platform opened on August 1, 2023, making the station accessible. The station was formally dedicated on October 3, 2023.

As of September 20, 2025, Ravenswood is served by all 71 trains (35 inbound, 36 outbound) on weekdays, and by all 30 trains (15 in each direction) on weekends and holidays. During the summer concert season, an extra weekend train to Ravinia Park station also stops here.

The Damen 'L' station on the CTA's Brown Line is three blocks to the west, while the closest Red Line station is Lawrence, located about 0.8 miles (1.3 km) east of Ravenswood station.

== Bus and rail connections ==
CTA Brown Line

- Damen

CTA

- 9 Ashland
- 81 Lawrence (Owl Service)
