= Rogers Park station =

Commuter rail station in Chicago, Illinois

Rogers Park

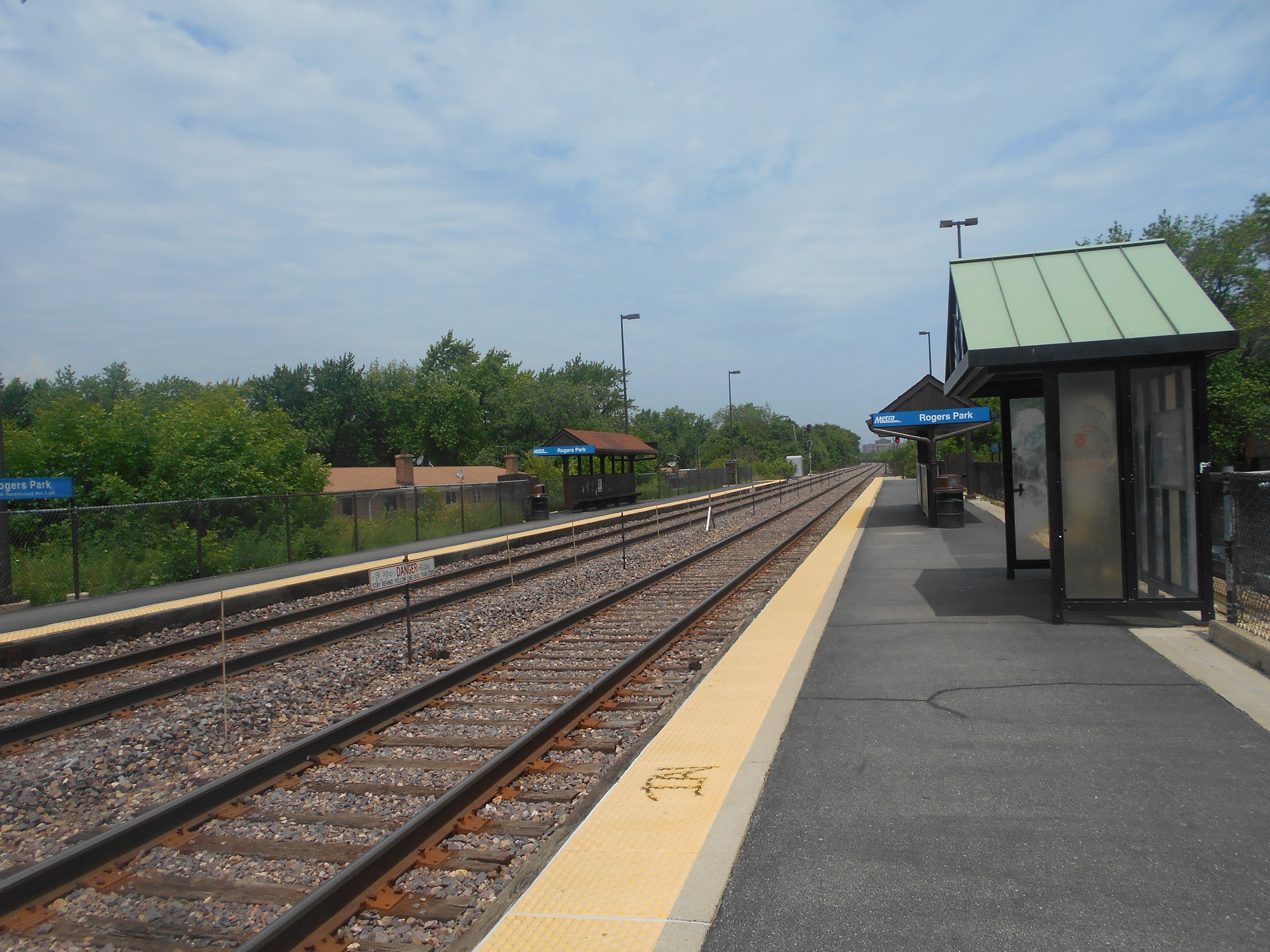
- Rogers Park station from the Kenosha-bound platform.

General information
- Location: 7000 North Ravenswood Avenue; Rogers Park, Chicago, Illinois 60626
- Coordinates: 42.0093°N 87.6755°W
- Owner: Metra
- Platforms: 2 side platforms
- Tracks: 2
- Connections: CTA Buses

Construction
- Accessible: Yes

Other information
- Fare zone: 2

History
- Opened: 1890

Passengers
- 2018: 1,393 (average weekday) ▲0.3%
- Rank: 26 out of 236

Services
| Preceding station | Metra | Following station |
|---|---|---|
| Main Street/Evanston toward Kenosha | Union Pacific North | Peterson/Ridge toward Ogilvie TC |
Former services
| Preceding station | Chicago and North Western Railway | Following station |
|---|---|---|
| Calvary toward Milwaukee | Milwaukee Division | Kenmore toward Chicago |
Track layout
Location

Rogers Park is a Metra commuter railroad station in the Rogers Park neighborhood on the north side of Chicago. It is located at 7000 North Ravenswood Avenue, between West Greenleaf Avenue and West Lunt Avenue. In Metra's zone-based fare system, Rogers Park is in zone 2. As of 2018, Rogers Park is the 26th busiest of Metra's 236 non-downtown stations, with an average of 1,393 weekday boardings. The neighborhood that surrounds the station is residential, with single-family houses and small apartment buildings, but just a block to the east is Clark Street, a major north–south artery with buses and shopping.

The station has two side platforms, and although it does not contain a ticket agent booth, a small heated waiting room is available on the Lunt side between 5:00 AM – 11:00 AM. This line retains the "left-hand main" policy of the original builder, the Chicago and North Western Railway: northbound trains stop on the west platform and southbound trains stop on the east platform.

Rogers Park is served by Metra's Union Pacific North Line trains, traveling between Ogilvie Transportation Center in Chicago and points as far north as Kenosha, Wisconsin. Travel time to Ogilvie is usually 20 minutes, but can be as fast as 15 minutes on a rush hour express train and as slow as 23 minutes during overcrowding.

As of September 20, 2025, Rogers Park is served by all 71 trains (35 inbound, 36 outbound) on weekdays, and by all 30 trains (15 in each direction) on weekends and holidays. During the summer concert season, an extra weekend train to Ravinia Park station also stops here.

The closest CTA Red Line station is Morse, located five blocks to the east of Rogers Park station.

== Bus connections ==
CTA

- 22 Clark (Owl Service)
- 96 Lunt (weekdays only)
