= John C. D'Amico =

American politician

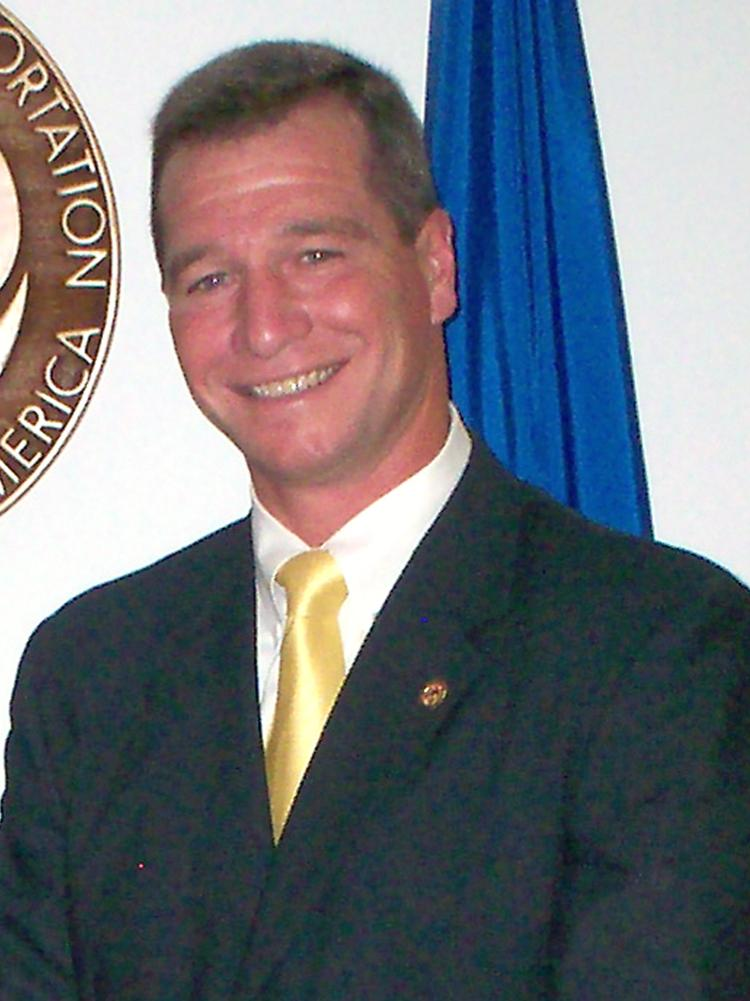

Member of the Illinois House of Representatives from the 15th district
- In office November 6, 2004 – November 5, 2021
- Preceded by: Ralph C. Capparelli
- Succeeded by: Michael Kelly

Personal details
- Born: June 12, 1962 (age 64) Chicago, Illinois, U.S.
- Party: Democratic
- Spouse: Christine
- Children: 3

John C. D'Amico (born June 12, 1962) is an American politician who served as a Democratic member of the Illinois House of Representatives, representing the 15th District from November 2004 to November 2021.

== Education and career ==
He graduated from St. Edward Elementary School and Weber High School in Chicago, then attended Northeastern Illinois University.

D'Amico joined the Chicago Department of Water in 1982 and now serves as a district foreman for the Chicago Water Department.

== Illinois House of Representatives ==
In the 2004 general election, D'Amico was elected to the Illinois House of Representatives from the 15th district. After the election, 15th district Democratic incumbent Ralph Capparelli (who lost re-election in the 20th district) resigned effective November 4, 2004. The Democratic Representative Committee of the 15th Representative District appointed D'Amico to fill the vacancy for the remainder of the 93rd General Assembly. D'Amico was sworn into office November 6, 2004. He represented the 15th District, and served on several committees:

- Aging
- Appropriations-Public Safety
- Labor
- Elections & Campaign Reform (Vice-Chairperson)
- Electric Utility Oversight
- Transportation & Motor Vehicles
- Workers' Compensation and Unemployment
- Committee of the Whole

He is a member of the Edgebrook Community Association, St. Edwards Athletic Advisory Committee, City Club of Chicago, Mayfair Lions Club, Queen of All Saints Men's Club and the Edgebrook Sauganash Athletic Association. He stepped down as a state legislator on November 5, 2021.

== Personal life ==
D'Amico and his wife Christine have three children. His aunt is former Alderman Margaret Laurino of Chicago's 39th Ward.

== Electoral history ==
Illinois 15th State House District Democratic Primary, 2004
Party	Candidate	Votes	%
Democratic	John C. D'Amico	8,660	59.01
Democratic	Dennis M. Fleming	6,015	40.99
Total votes		14,675	100.0

Illinois 15th State House District General Election, 2004
Party	Candidate	Votes	%
Democratic	John C. D'Amico	25,757	66.91
Republican	William C. "Bill" Miceli	12,737	33.09
Total votes		38,494	100.0

Illinois 15th State House District General Election, 2006
Party	Candidate	Votes	%
Democratic	John C. D'Amico (incumbent)	22,677	100.0
Total votes		22,677	100.0

Illinois 15th State House District General Election, 2008
Party	Candidate	Votes	%
Democratic	John C. D'Amico (incumbent)	29,022	100.0
Total votes		29,022	100.0

Illinois 15th State House District General Election, 2010
Party	Candidate	Votes	%
Democratic	John C. D'Amico (incumbent)	20,827	100.0
Total votes		20,827	100.0

Illinois 15th State House District General Election, 2012
Party	Candidate	Votes	%
Democratic	John C. D'Amico (incumbent)	27,928	99.92
Write-in votes	Joseph Hedrick	22	0.08
Total votes		27,950	100.0

Illinois 15th State House District General Election, 2014
Party	Candidate	Votes	%
Democratic	John C. D'Amico (incumbent)	16,433	62.25
Republican	Gregory A. Bedell	9,967	37.75
Total votes		26,400	100.0

Illinois 15th State House District Democratic Primary, 2016
Party	Candidate	Votes	%
Democratic	John C. D'Amico (incumbent)	11,437	59.88
Democratic	Jac Charlier	7,663	40.12
Total votes			100.0

Illinois 15th State House District General Election, 2016
Party	Candidate	Votes	%
Democratic	John C. D'Amico (incumbent)	25,586	61.48
Republican	Jonathan Edelman	16,030	38.52
Total votes		41,616	100.0

Illinois 15th State House District General Election, 2018
Party	Candidate	Votes	%
Democratic	John C. D'Amico (incumbent)	21,908	61.50
Republican	Amanda Biela	13,714	38.50
Total votes		35,622	100.0

Illinois 15th State House District General Election, 2020
Party	Candidate	Votes	%
Democratic	John C. D'Amico (incumbent)	35,587	100.0
Total votes		35,587	100.0
