= Richard Elrod =

American politician

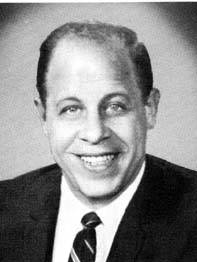
- Elrod, circa 1969

Judge of the Cook County Circuit Court
- In office August 1988 – April 19, 2014

Sheriff of Cook County, Illinois
- In office 1970–1986
- Preceded by: Joseph I. Woods
- Succeeded by: James E. O'Grady

Member of the Illinois House of Representatives from the 13th district
- In office 1969–1970
- Preceded by: LaSalle J. Michaels
- Succeeded by: Howard W. Carroll/ Charles J. Fleck Jr.

Personal details
- Born: February 17, 1934 Chicago, Illinois
- Died: April 19, 2014 (aged 80) Chicago, Illinois
- Party: Democratic Party
- Education: Northwestern University

Richard J. Elrod (February 17, 1934 – April 19, 2014) was an American jurist, sheriff, and legislator.

== Biography ==
Born to a Jewish family in Chicago, Illinois, Elrod received his law degree from Northwestern University in 1958.

Elrod's father was Arthur X. Elrod, a Democratic Party operative who served as a Cook County Commissioner and Chicago's 25th ward's committeeman.

Elrod was Chicago's assistant corporation counsel from 1958 through 1970, and its chief city prosecutor from 1960 through 1970.

Elrod served in the Illinois House of Representatives, in 1969, as a Democrat. While serving in the Illinois General Assembly, Elrod was seriously injured and left paralyzed while helping a Chicago police officer capture Brian Flanagan during the Days of Rage conflict in 1969. Flanagan and two witnesses maintained that Elrod sustained his injury after attempting to tackle Flanagan and instead impacting the corner of a building, while Elrod and several police officers claimed that Flanagan repeatedly kicked him in the neck with construction boots. Flanagan went to trial for several charges related to the incident, including attempted murder, but was acquitted of all of them.

Elrod was elected sheriff of Cook County, Illinois in 1970, defeating Republican nominee Bernard Carey. He would serve four terms. He was reelected three times, first in 1974 (defeating Republican Peter Bensinger), then in 1978 (defeating Republican Donald Mulack), then in 1982 (defeating Republican Joseph Kozenczak). In 1986, he lost reelection to Republican James E. O'Grady.

From 1986 until 1988, he worked as the senior assistant attorney general, working under Illinois Attorney General Neil Hartigan.

Elrod was appointed as a judge on the Circuit Court of Cook County in August 1988, where he continued to serve until his death in 2014. He died of cancer in Chicago, Illinois.

== Personal life ==
In 1955, he married Marilyn Mann; they had two children: Steven Elrod and Audrey Elrod Lakin. After his death, services were held at Temple Am Shalom in Glencoe, Illinois. His sister was Gloria Sheppard Bliss.

== In popular culture ==
Elrod appears as a character in Saul Bellow's 1982 novel The Dean's December, both for the Days of Rage injury he received early in the novel and later in the protagonist Albert Corde's friendship during Elrod's career as sheriff of Cook County.
