= Ralph C. Capparelli =

American politician (1924–2020)

Member of the Illinois House of Representatives from the 13th district 16th district (1971-1983)
- In office January 1971 – December 2004
- Preceded by: William M. Zachacki
- Succeeded by: Michael P. McAuliffe

Personal details
- Born: April 12, 1924 Chicago, Illinois, U.S.
- Died: December 31, 2020 (aged 96)
- Party: Democratic
- Spouse: Cordelia
- Children: Two
- Education: Northern Illinois University
- Profession: Teacher; Politician

Ralph C. Capparelli (April 12, 1924 – December 31, 2020) was an American politician and member of the Illinois House of Representatives.

Capparelli was born in Chicago in April 1924. He attended Prussing Grammar School and Taft High School. He also served in the United States Navy for three years, earning a Battle Star. He attended Northern Illinois University, where he earned a Bachelor of Science in education. He taught classes for the Chicago Park District before taking on management positions with the district. He served as an assistant to Harry H. Semrow, a member of the Cook County Board of Commissioners. He married and had two children. He was elected to the Illinois House of Representatives as one of three legislators from the 16th district.

In the 2001 decennial redistricting process, Capparelli was drawn into the same district as incumbent Republican legislator Michael McAuliffe and incumbent Democratic legislator Robert Bugielski. Capparelli opted to run in the 15th district, which contained much of his old territory, while McAuliffe defeated Buielski in the new 20th district. Capparelli declined to move into the new 15th district and opted to face McAuliffe in the 2004 election. McAuliffe defeated Capparelli handily in the election. After the election, Ralph Capparelli resigned effective November 4, 2004 and was succeeded in the 15th district by John C. D'Amico, the winner of the 2004 election in the 15th district.

He served as Democratic committeeman for the 41st ward from 1992, when he defeated Roman Pucinski in the Democratic primary, until 2008, when he lost his position to 03y O'Connor. He died on December 31, 2020, at the age of 96.
