= Howard W. Carroll =

American lawyer and politician

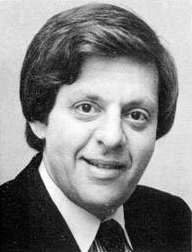
- official portrait, circa 1981

Member of the Illinois Senate
- In office 1973–1999
- Preceded by: Thomas G. Lyons
- Succeeded by: Ira Silverstein
- Constituency: 15th district (1973–1983); 1st district (1983–1993); 8th district (1993–1999)

Member of the Illinois House of Representatives from the 13th district
- In office 1971–1973
- Preceded by: Richard Elrod/ Elroy C. Sandquist
- Succeeded by: district disestablished

Personal details
- Born: July 28, 1942
- Died: October 1, 2021 (aged 79)
- Party: Democratic Party
- Spouse: Edna Stagman
- Children: 2
- Education: Roosevelt University; DePaul University College of Law

Howard W. "Howie" Carroll (July 28, 1942 – October 1, 2021) was an American lawyer and Democratic politician who served in the Illinois General Assembly.

== Early life and career ==
Born in Chicago, Illinois, Carroll was raised in the West Rogers Park area of the city. He was Jewish.

Carroll graduated from Senn High School. He received his bachelor's degree in business administration from Roosevelt University in 1964. He received his law degree from DePaul University College of Law. At law school he participated in moot court, where he was partnered with Richard M. Daley (who later served as mayor of Chicago).

After graduating law school, Carroll practiced law in Chicago, Illinois.

== Illinois General Assembly ==
Carroll served in the Illinois General Assembly for 28 years.

Carroll served in the Illinois House of Representatives from 1971 to 1973, having been elected in 1970 to one of the seats in the 13th district. He faced no opposition in his 1970 Democratic primary election.

Carroll thereafter served in the Illinois Senate for 26 years, from 1973 to 1999. Elected first to the 15th district in 1972, he defeated Republican nominee Walter Duda (a former state senator). After the 1980 redistricting, he was moved the 8th district and after the 1990 redistricting he was moved the 1st district.

Additionally, for 20 years Carroll served as the Democratic committeeman for Chicago's 50th Ward.

=== Bills authored ===
Carroll authored many bills centered on promoting equal rights and protecting human rights. In April 1978 he proposed a bill that would have made public displays of racial hatred a crime in Illinois. This bill was never passed. Bills included a first-in-nation anti hate crimes bill, and a bill that made Illinois the first to include protections in its human rights act against sexuality-based discrimination. He also authored the Human Rights Act, which went into effect in 1980 and prohibited workplace age discrimination.

Carroll authored the Comprehensive Health Insurance Plan Act (CHIP), which was enacted in 1987. It provided pharmaceutical aid to senior citizens.

=== Appropriations committee ===
For sixteen years, he was chair of the state senate's Appropriations Committee (budget committee). This is the longest tenure anyone had had as chair of the committee. Carroll was regarded to be a budget expert.

=== Other actions ===
In the late-1970s, Carroll stood in opposition to efforts by the American Nazi Party to hold a neo-Nazi march in Skokie, Illinois. He spoke of his personal opposition to their plans even after National Socialist Party of America v. Village of Skokie allowed them to do so. He wrote an op-ed in the Chicago Tribune condemning their planned march. Ultimately, the planned June 1978 march was moved from Skokie (home to a large population of Holocaust survivors) to the South Side of Chicago.

In the 1970s, Caroll successfully pushed to make Illinois the first U.S. state government to purchase Israel Bonds.

Caroll advocated during redistricting processes for more districts to be created that would provide opportunities for the election Jewish candidates.

For many years, he hosted the annual Labor Day "Tase of the 50th Ward" food festival.

== 1998 congressional campaign ==
Carroll ran for Congress in Illinois's 9th congressional district in 1998, but lost the Democratic primary to (then-state representative) Jan Schakowsky. In the Democratic primary to succeed longtime incumbent Democrat Sidney R. Yates, In the primary, Carroll faced both Schakowsky and J. B. Pritzker. Pritkzer would two-decades later go on to be elected governor of Illinois. Carroll placed second, receiving 34.40% of the vote to Schakowsky's 45.14% and Pritzker's 20.48%.

The 9th district represented the northern lakefront of Chicago, as well as the suburbs of Evanston and Skokie. It had a large Jewish electorate, with the district long being regarded as the "Jewish seat" in Illinois' congressional delegation. Yates was Jewish, and all three Democratic contenders to succeed him were as well. Originally also running was a (non-Jewish) fourth candidate: Charles A. "Pat" Boyle, an attorney (whose late father, Charles A. Boyle, had served as a congressman in the 1950s). The district was also considered among the most liberal congressional districts in the United States. Journalist James Ylisela Jr. observed that Pritzker, Schakowsky, and Carroll largely all ran on platforms aligned with the Democratic Party agenda that Yates had championed. However, the Chicago Tribune separately noted that Carroll and Pritzker each ran on a more moderate (less liberal) platform than Schakowsky, and potentially wound up competing for many of the same voters. At the time, the election was one of the most-expensive congressional primaries in U.S. history, and Prizker spent nearly $1 million of his own money to fund his run (including $500,000 on television ads in the Chicago market).

== Later career ==
After leaving the state legislature, he continued practicing tax law and business law at his lawfirm, Carroll & Sain. He worked until approximately 2017, when Alzheimer's disease prevented him from continuing.

Carroll served on Illinois' State Government Suggestion Award Board On January 27, 2016, Senate President John Cullerton reappointed Carroll to an additional term as a member, expiring January 11, 2017. The State Government Suggestion Award Board administers the program that rewards state employees and the general public for suggestions to improve operation of state government which results in substantial monetary savings with a cash award.

== Nonprofit work ==
Carroll served on the board of directors of the Jewish United Fund, as a trustee of the Michael Reese Health Trust, and as an officer of the Weiss Memorial Hospital Foundation. He was involved in the creation of the North Shore Center for the Performing Arts, and served as the vice chairman of its nonprofit.

== Personal life ==
Carroll married Eda Stagman (who adopted his surname upon marriage) Together they had two daughters, and were married for nearly 48 years before his death.

Carroll was commonly referred to by the nickname "Howie". He lived in the Rogers Park neighborhood of Chicago while serving in the state senate. After his 1998 U.S. congressional election loss, he moved to Chicago's northern suburbs. He lived first in Lake Bluff, then in Winnetka, and lastly in Highland Park, Illinois.

Late in life, Carroll suffered from Alzheimer's disease and entered hospice care at the Auberage memory care community in Highland Park. He died there on October 1, 2021.
