= Book (magazine) =

Defunct American magazine

- Editor-in-chief: Jerome Kramer
- Frequency: Bi-monthly
- Publisher: Mark Gleason
- Total circulation: 1,400,000 (2000)
- First issue: October/November 1998
- Final issue: November/December 2003
- Company: West Egg Communications
- Country: United States
- Based in: New York City
- Language: English
- Website: bookmagazine.com/aboutus 2000-10-05

Book (later retitled Barnes & Noble Presents Book) was an American bi-monthly popular literary magazine founded in 1998 by Mark Gleason and Jerome Kramer and published by West Egg Communications. Described by its editor as "the Rolling Stone—not the Billboard—of the book industry", MediaBistro.com said it was "also the Us Weekly of the industry, offering up juicy tidbits of what passes for gossip in this relatively respectable trade", noting for prospective writers that it was aimed at "enthusiastic leisure readers". The New York Times said Book "profiles authors and their works in much the way that People magazine reports on celebrities".

In November 2000, bookseller Barnes & Noble purchased a 50-percent share of the company for $4.2 million, after which the magazine operated as a partnership. Thirty-one issues were published through the end of 2003, when the magazine ceased operations after Barnes & Noble stopped its funding following several years of losses. During the entire run, Gleason served as Book's publisher and president and Kramer as its editor-in-chief.

In 2003, Book was nominated in the fiction category of the National Magazine Awards.

== History ==
Book's editorial and production offices were originally in Chicago, with business operations running out of Summit, New Jersey. Kramer and Gleason—a former reporter for Advertising Age—raised $200,000 to publish the first two issues, mostly from their own pockets. Before Barnes & Noble stepped in, Book lost $700,000 in its first two years of operation.

In November 2000, the magazine made a deal with Barnes & Noble to offer a free one-year Book subscription to new members of their "Reader's Advantage" loyalty program. This added about 1.3 million readers to the magazine's original circulation of 100,000, although the magazine promised its advertisers a "base rate" of 700,000. Kramer said "when it came down to converting those people over [to paying subscribers] we ran into a concrete wall." Readers who were receiving the magazine for free through Barnes & Noble refused to pay for subscriptions. Only five percent of readers renewed their subscriptions. Gleason said that advertisers had difficulty believing the circulation numbers because they rose so quickly; the magazine's production costs grew, but advertising income did not. In an article about small publishers with income problems due to an advertising recession in 2001, Gleason remarked, "It's harder for the independents ... because usually we're not the first item for people buying advertising". To help cover the costs, Barnes & Noble invested $4.2 million in the company, gaining half ownership. In 2000, the magazine relocated to Manhattan after Barnes & Noble's investment.

In March 2002, the bookstore chain ended the promotion, and the magazine's circulation fell to 150,000. The bookseller had been paying a fee to Book for the free subscriptions, but felt that the deal had become too expensive.

Between 2001 and 2002, advertising income at the magazine tripled to $1.5 million. However, by early 2003, the production costs of the magazine overwhelmed the revenues, forcing Book and Barnes & Noble to restructure the partnership: Barnes and Noble gave Book a $2.5 million loan in 2001, and in 2002 the magazine lost about $1 million. The magazine's name was changed to Barnes & Noble Presents Book with the May/June 2003 issue, and the store displayed the magazine more prominently. The "base rate" for advertisers was cut to 150,000. The name change was a gamble, because it meant the other nationwide United States bookstore chain, Borders Books, would not carry the magazine featuring its rival's name. There were also concerns that the rebranding would cause readers to assume that Book's content was controlled by the bookstore.

In mid-October 2003, the bookseller's senior leadership met with Kramer and Gleason and told them that the company was not going to provide any further funding. "They'd made the decision that they were not magazine publishers", said Kramer.

Following Book's demise, Kramer was recruited as managing director and editor-in-chief of the VNU U.S. Literary Group, publisher of Kirkus Reviews.

Along with book reviews and author interviews, Book offered features such as "Anita Shreve's Secret Passions" and "Hype! Hype! Hype! Wild Publicity Stunts". Front covers of the magazine's issues often featured close-ups of writers, including Tom Wolfe, T. C. Boyle, Frank McCourt, Nicole Kidman, J. K. Rowling, Ethan Hawke, Sebastian Junger, and Toni Morrison. Book frequently featured "Best" features, such as "The 100 Best Characters in Fiction Since 1900", which ran in the March/April 2002 issue, and "20 Books That Changed America”, which ran in July/August 2003.
