= Nathan J. Kaplan =

American lawyer, politician, and jurist

Nathan J. Kaplan (June 29, 1910 – March 15, 1997) was a lawyer, politician, and jurist.

Born in Chicago, Illinois, Kaplan went to Crane Junior College and received his J.D. degree from University of Chicago Law School. He was general counsel for the United Brother of Welders, Cutters and Helpers of America from 1942 to 1945. He practiced law in Chicago and was involved in the Democratic Party. From 1956 until 1962, Kaplan served in the Illinois House of Representatives. He served in the Chicago City Council in 1966. From 1966 until his retirement in 1978, Kaplan served as an Illinois Circuit Court judge. Kaplan died at his home in Longboat Key, Florida.
