= Roger McAuliffe =

American politician

Roger P. McAuliffe (July 6, 1938 – July 5, 1996), was a Republican member of the Illinois House of Representatives.

He served from 1973 until his death in 1996 - a total of 12 consecutive terms in the Illinois General Assembly, and was also elected eight times as Republican Ward Committeeman of Chicago's 38th Ward. A member of Chicago's 38th Ward regular Republican organization since the late 1950s, he was an army veteran who lost the ward's aldermanic election in 1963. A long-time top Chicago Republican precinct captain, McAuliffe succeeded William J. Murray as 38th Ward Republican Ward Committeeman, in a special organization election (voted on by the 38th Ward's 73 Republican precinct captains), following Murray's death in December, 1968. In November, 1972, Roger Philip McAuliffe was elected State Representative for Illinois's 16th Legislative District. He was re-elected to twelve successive two-year terms, prior to his drowning while fishing in northern Wisconsin on the day before he would have celebrated his 58th birthday.

The Illinois General Assembly passed a resolution to rename the Chicago North Drivers License Facility (of which he had been the manager before he became a legislator) the Roger P. McAuliffe Drivers License Facility.

His son, Michael P. McAuliffe, was appointed to succeed him, and held the seat until his resignation in June 2019. Between them, father and son represented this northwestern Chicago district for 46 years.
