= West Ridge, Chicago =

Community area in Chicago, Illinois

West Ridge
- Community area
- Community Area 02 – West Ridge
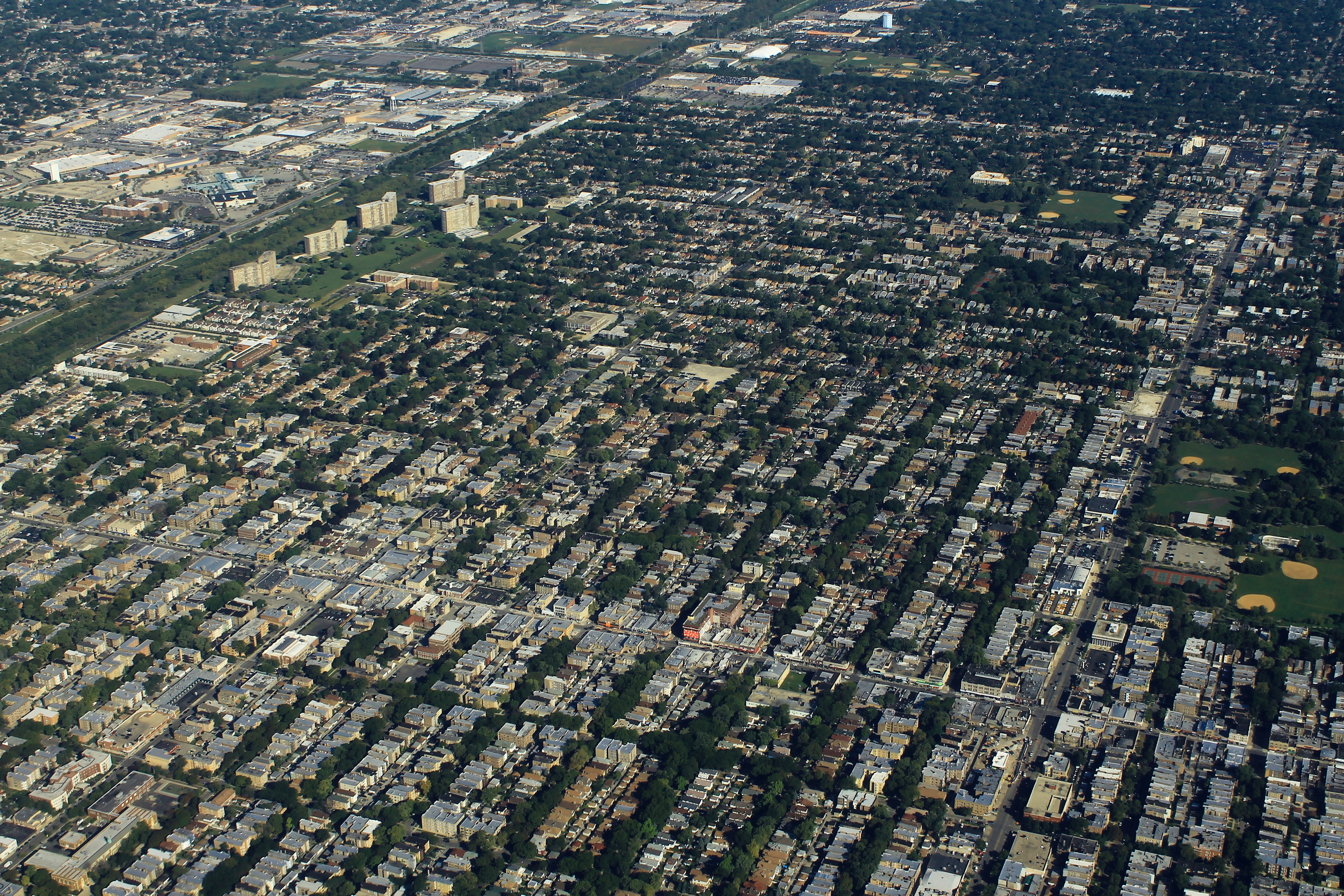
- Aerial view of West Ridge

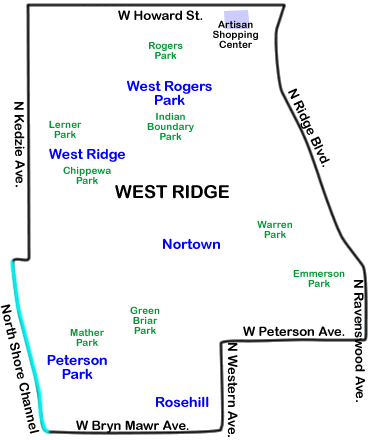
- Streetmap

- Location within the city of Chicago
- Coordinates: 42°00′N 87°41.4′W
- Country: United States
- State: Illinois
- County: Cook
- City: Chicago
- Neighborhoods: List: Arcadia Terrace; Peterson Park; West Rogers Park; Rosehill Cemetery; Nortown; East Ridge; West Ridge; Golden Ghetto; North Lincoln Square; East North Park; West Edgewater

Area
  - Total: 3.53 sq mi (9.1 km^{2})

Population (2024)
  - Total: 78,373
  - Density: 22,200/sq mi (8,570/km^{2})

Demographics 2024
  - White: 39.4%
  - Black: 11.7%
  - Hispanic: 20.6%
  - Asian: 21.8%
  - Other: 6.5%

Educational Attainment 2024
  - High School Diploma or Higher: 87.2%
  - Bachelor's Degree or Higher: 43.9%
- Time zone: UTC-6 (CST)
  - Summer (DST): UTC-5 (CDT)
- ZIP Codes: 60645 and parts of 60659
- Median Household income 2024: $70,823
- Source: U.S. Census, Record Information Services

West Ridge is one of the 77 community areas of Chicago in Illinois, United States. It is historically a middle-class neighborhood located on the far North Side of the City of Chicago. It is located in the 50th ward and the 40th ward.

West Ridge is an ethnically diverse neighborhood, being home to the Midwest's largest Hasidic community, as well as other Jewish, Irish American, German-American, Indian, Pakistani, Bangladeshi, Assyrian, Russian, Korean and Rohingya immigrant communities.

== History ==
Historically called "North Town", and frequently referred to as "West Rogers Park", it is bordered on the north by Howard Street, on the east by Ridge Boulevard, Western Avenue, and Ravenswood Avenue, the south by Bryn Mawr Avenue and Peterson Avenue, and on the west by Kedzie Avenue and the North Shore channel of the Chicago River. At one time joined with neighboring Rogers Park, it seceded to become its own village in 1890 over a conflict concerning park districts (known as the Cabbage War). West Ridge was annexed to Chicago on April 4, 1893, along with Rogers Park.

The area's Jewish community began to boom in the 1930s as new arrivals left behind older and more crowded Jewish neighbourhoods, such as North Lawndale. The area's first synaogue, Ner Tamid, a Conservative congregation, was built in 1938, followed by Congregation B'nai Jacob, also Conservative, in 1942. The community peaked in the early-1960s with 47,000 Jewish residents, making up nearly 75% of the neighourhood. The main throughfare, Devon Avenue was home to many Jewish businesses and stores, as well as the iconic Bnei Ruven synagogue, which remains. The remaining Jewish stores are mostly on what is known honorarily as Golda Meir Boulevard, a section of Devon Avenue. In 1960 a Jewish Community Center opened and the area was home to twelve synagogues from denominations such as Reform, Conservative and Orthodox Judaism became active.

== Geography ==
=== Neighborhoods and sub-areas ===
==== Golden Ghetto ====
The Golden Ghetto is bounded on the north by Warren Park and Pratt Avenue and on the south by Peterson Avenue. It acquired its name from the thriving Jewish community there from about 1930 to the mid-1970s. The Jewish community peaked at over 47,000 in the 1960s.That community began to drift into the suburbs in the 1960s, and the neighborhood began to be home to South Asians and Russian Jews from about that time.

The heyday of the area is the topic of Adam Langer's Crossing California, told from the perspective of the second-generation residents during their middle school and teenage years. There has been a recent resurgence in Jewish residents, up from a nadir of 20,000 to around 25,000 in the late 2010s, due to increased Orthodox residents.

==== Rogers Park Manor Bungalow Historic District ====
The Rogers Park Manor Bungalow Historic District is a residential historic district in West Ridge. The district includes 329 buildings, 247 of which are Chicago bungalows built in the 1920s. The district was added to the National Register of Historic Places on November 15, 2005.

==== Talman West Ridge Bungalow Historic District ====
The Talman West Ridge Bungalow Historic District is a residential historic district in West Ridge. Of the district's 272 buildings, 181 are either brick Chicago bungalows or older stucco bungalows built from 1919 to 1930.

== Demographics ==
Historical population
Census	Pop.	Note	%±
1930	39,759		—
1940	43,553		9.5%
1950	47,930		10.0%
1960	63,884		33.3%
1970	65,477		2.5%
1980	61,129		−6.6%
1990	65,374		6.9%
2000	73,199		12.0%
2010	71,942		−1.7%
2020	77,122		7.2%
2024 (est.)	78,373		1.6%

== Government ==
Devon Avenue

West Ridge has supported the Democratic Party in the past three presidential elections, though relative support declined slightly from 2016 to 2020. In the 2020 presidential election, West Ridge cast 17,222 votes for Joe Biden (69.8%) and 7,281 votes for Donald Trump (28.9%). In the 2016 presidential election, the neighborhood cast 16,712 votes for Hillary Clinton (73.5%) and 4,772 votes for Donald Trump (21.5%). In the 2012 presidential election, West Ridge cast 14,446 votes for Barack Obama (71.8%) and 5,345 votes for Mitt Romney (26.6%).

It was represented on the Chicago City Council by Alderman Bernard Stone from 1973 until May 2011. On April 5, 2011, Debra Silverstein defeated Stone in a runoff election and now represents the 50th Ward, which encompasses West Ridge.

== Education ==
=== Public schools ===
Chicago Public Schools operates public schools.

- Clinton Elementary School
- Jamieson Elementary School
- Daniel Boone Elementary School
- Stephen Decatur Classical School
- George Armstrong Elementary School
- Philip Rogers Elementary School
- Stone Scholastic Academy
- West Ridge Elementary School
- Stephen Tyng Mather High School

=== Private schools ===
- Victor C. Neumann School
- Tzemach Tzedek Elementary School

== Infrastructure ==
=== Hoyne Field ===
Completed in 1996, it is the home for NCAA Men’s and Women’s Loyola Soccer teams. In addition to the university softball team. A FieldTurf synthetic field was installed in 2005. The field lends its name to Thomas Hoyne, a prominent lawyer and businessman who was elected as Mayor of Chicago in 1876, despite never taking office.

=== Public transit ===
Bus service is operated by Chicago Transit Authority and Pace. Metra rail is accessible at Peterson/Ridge station.

== Notable people ==
- Joe Aiello (1890–1930), organized crime leader. He resided at 2553 West Lunt Avenue.
- Sidney Blumenthal (born 1948), journalist, political operative, and Senior Advisor to President Bill Clinton. He resided at West Birchwood Avenue in West Rogers Park as a child.
- Howard W. Carroll (1942–2021), member of the Illinois Senate from 1973 to 1999. He resided at 6014 North Francisco Avenue during his political career.
- Philip H. Corboy (1924–2012), trial lawyer. He was a childhood resident of West Rogers Park, living at 2836 West Lunt Street.
- Leo Lerner (1907–1965), newspaper publisher. According to the 1940 United States census, he resided at 2120 West Lunt Avenue.
- Louis A. Lerner (1935–1984), United States Ambassador to Norway during the Carter administration. According to the 1940 United States census, he resided at 2120 West Lunt Avenue.
- John H. Leims (1921–1985), Captain in the United States Marine Corps and recipient of the Medal of Honor. He resided in West Ridge at 5837 North Talman Avenue.
- "Big Tim" Murphy (1885–1928), labor racketeer. He resided at 2525 West Morse Avenue until his murder outside the residence.
- Harry Spanjer (1873–1958), lightweight and welterweight boxer. He resided at 2501 West Lunt Avenue.
- Louis Trinca-Pasat (born 1991), American football player, raised in West Rogers Park
- Scott Turow (born 1949), writer and lawyer
