= Michael P. McAuliffe =

American politician

Member of the Illinois House of Representatives from the 20th district
- In office July 1996 – June 2019
- Preceded by: Roger McAuliffe
- Succeeded by: Bradley Stephens

Personal details
- Born: December 7, 1963 (age 62) Chicago, Illinois
- Party: Republican
- Spouse: Kim McAuliffe
- Children: Conor McAuliffe and Bianca McAuliffe
- Education: Triton College
- Occupation: Politician

Michael P. McAuliffe (born December 7, 1963) is a former Republican member of the Illinois House of Representatives, representing the 20th district in northwestern Chicago. He was first appointed in 1997, following the death of his father, Roger McAuliffe; between them, the McAuliffes represented northwestern Chicago for 46 years. On June 17, 2019, McAuliffe resigned from the Illinois House of Representatives. He was the only Republican to represent a significant portion of Chicago in the Illinois General Assembly. On June 29, 2019, Republican Bradley Stephens, the Mayor of Rosemont, was appointed to succeed McAuliffe.

McAuliffe was noted for his bipartisan approach during his time in the Illinois General Assembly, supporting several bipartisan deals, including infrastructure improvements and expansions in gambling. He drew both support and criticism from Republicans and Democrats alike.
