= William M. Zachacki =

American politician

William M. Zachacki, Sr. (July 9, 1913 – January 4, 1969) was an American politician.

Born in Chicago, Illinois, Zachacki went to Columbia Business School and worked in production during World War II. Zachacki was involved in the Democratic Party. Zachacki served in the Illinois House of Representatives from 1967 until his death in 1969.
