= Chemetco =

American copper smelting company

Chemetco Inc.
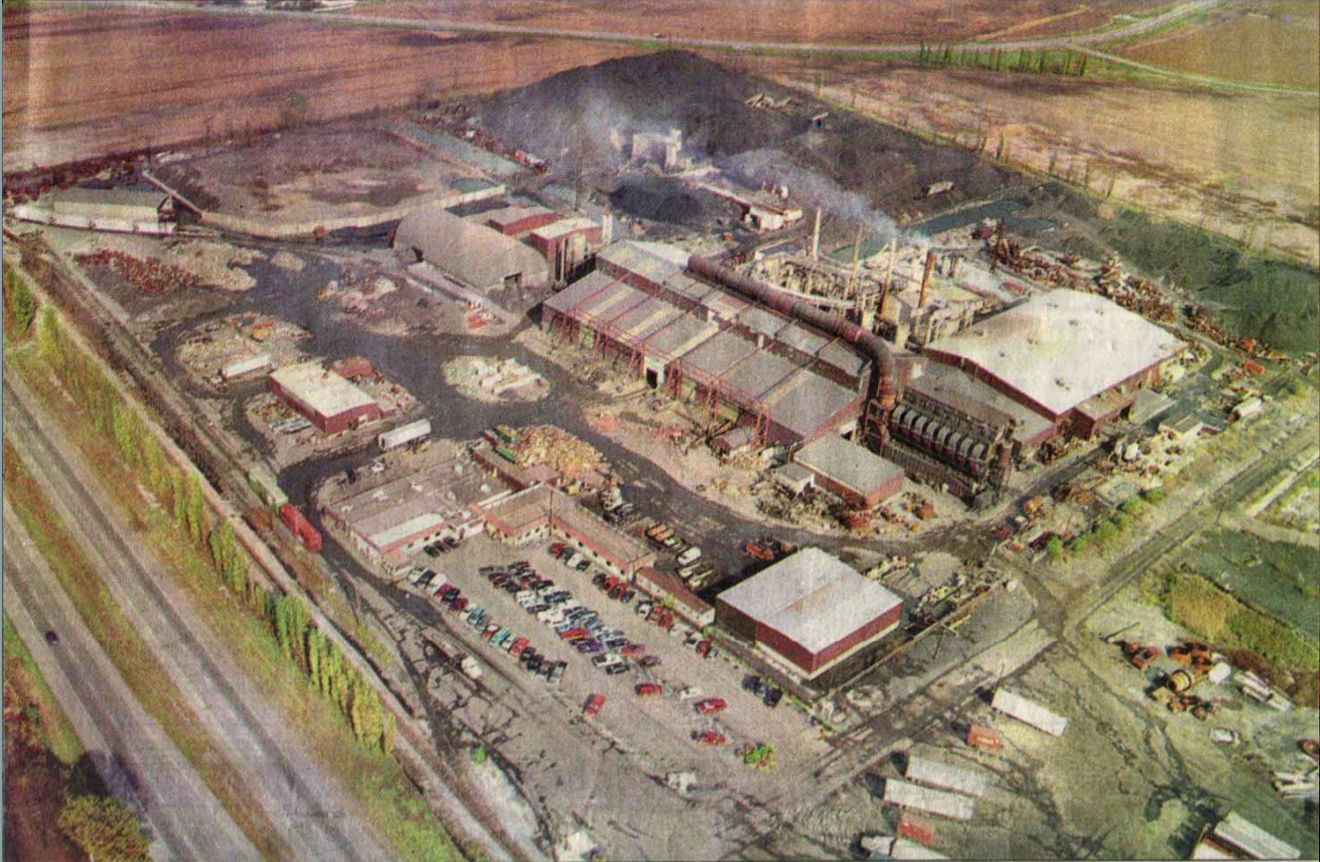
- Chemetco aerial view, before accumulation of significant piles of hazardous waste.
- Type: Private
- Industry: Non-ferrous metal recycling
- Founded: 1972
- Defunct: 2001
- Fate: Chapter 11 bankruptcy following felony criminal conviction under the Clean Water Act
- Headquarters: Hartford, Illinois, United States
- Area served: United States
- Key people: John M. Suarez, described in Illinois Pollution Control Board testimony as company owner in 1993 and listed as president in EPA PRP records and FEC filings.; Denis L. Feron, former executive (named in 1999 federal indictment)
- Products: Copper anodes and cathodes

Chemetco was a major U.S. secondary copper smelter in Hartford, Illinois, that operated from 1969 until 2001. At its peak, the facility produced about 125,000 tonnes of refined copper annually from recycled material, which represented a major proportion of domestic secondary copper refining capacity. The company reported revenues of roughly $500 million in 1999.

Chemetco and its senior officers became involved in multiple federal investigations during the 1990s. In 1992, the Federal Election Commission found that Chemetco, as well as its company president, John M. Suarez, and associate José Bóveda, arranged unlawful corporate and foreign campaign contributions affecting the U.S presidential primary in Missouri. The FEC's General Counsel described the payments as "clearly laundered money," and evidenced that funds were routed through entities owned by Chemetco and a Belgian holding company. Suarez took over ownership of the company the following year.

In 1996, an inspector from the Illinois EPA discovered a concealed 10-inch pipe discharging heavy metals from the smelter into wetlands connected to the Mississippi River. The finding led to a joint investigation by the U.S EPA, FBI, and Illinois State Police, leading to federal indictments against the company and its chief officer, Denis L. Feron, who owned parent company Metallo Chimique. Prosecution and conviction followed, for conspiracy and felony violations of the Clean Water Act. After Chemetco entered a nolo contendere ("no contest") plea, the company was fined $3.8 million, then ceased operations in 2001, following Chapter 7 bankruptcy.

The case established legal precedent when the Seventh Circuit held in United States v. Chemetco, Inc. that the number of violation days is a sentencing factor for judges, rather than a matter for a jury. Atmospheric modeling later identified Chemetco as one of the largest individual North American sources of dioxins in the Arctic, including measurable fallout in Nunavut, Canada. Federal investigations also documented extensive worker exposure to health problems including chronic beryllium disease and hazards such as widespread lead overexposure.

The former Chemetco site was made a Superfund cleanup project in 2010 and remains under oversight by the EPA. Remediation continues to address contaminated soils, slag, and hazardous waste; at the same time, ongoing litigation involves numerous Potentially Responsible Parties including Fortune 500 companies.

== Location, history and operations ==
38°50′06″N 90°05′42″W

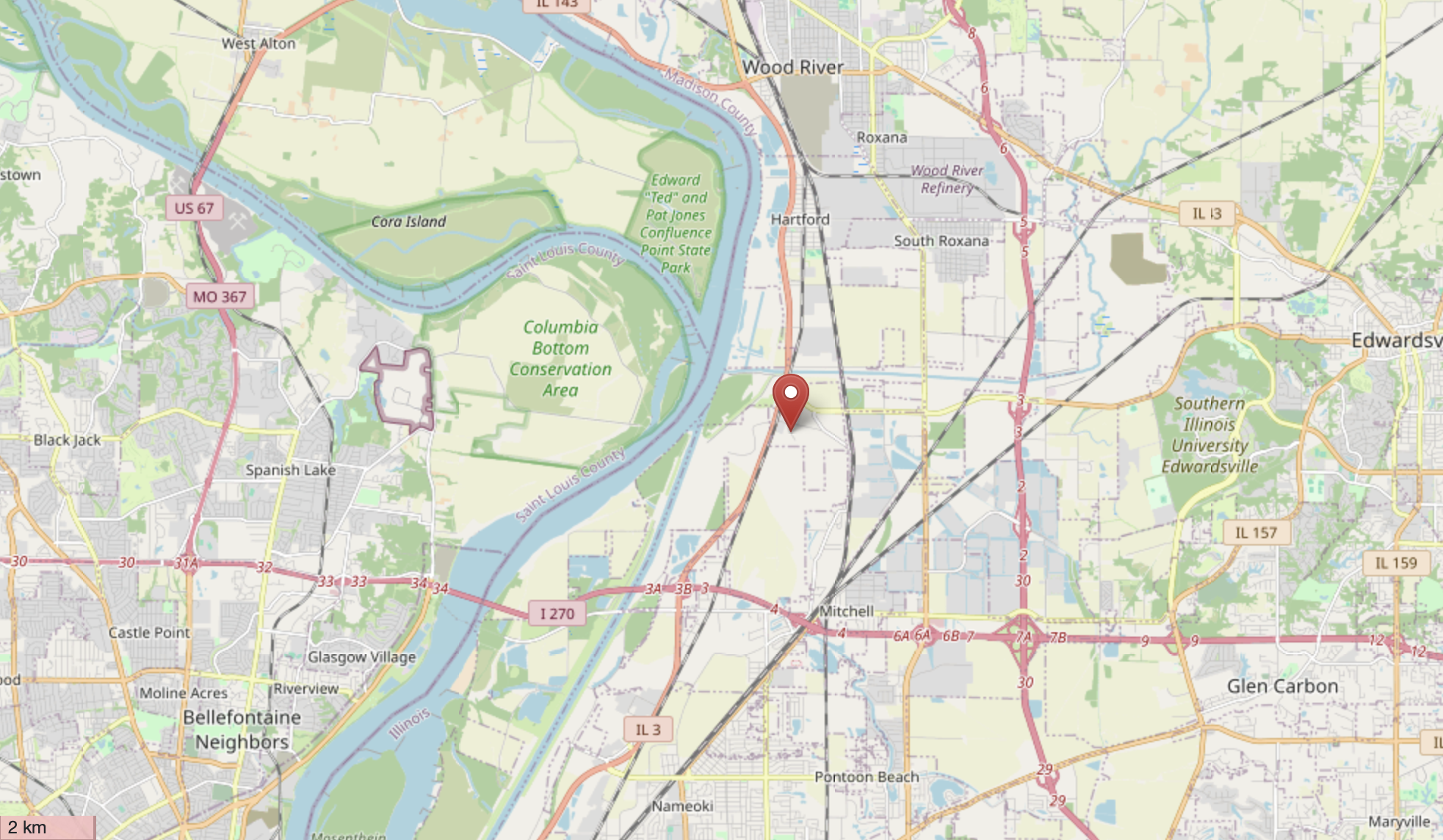
Chemetco Superfund site

=== Location ===
The Chemetco smelter was in Hartford, Illinois, one mile east of the Mississippi River, within Madison County's American Bottom floodplain. The facility occupied roughly 41 acres of a 230-acre tract.

=== History ===
Construction of the plant, originally with the name Chemico, began in 1969. Three 70-ton gas-fired converters were installed, and a fourth later. For each converter, there was also a melting furnace.

The business was incorporated as a Delaware company and renamed Chemetco, Inc. in 1972.

=== Ownership ===
Corporate records indicate that Chemetco underwent a change in ownership during the early 1990s. In testimony before the Illinois Pollution Control Board, Chemetco president David Hoff stated that John M. Suarez purchased Chemetco in 1993.

== 1992 U.S presidential primary 'laundered money' campaign contributions ==
In June 1992, a year before John M. Suarez took over as Chemetco's owner, a complaint was filed with the Federal Election Commission alleging that contributions connected to Chemetco's president, John Suarez, and associate José Bóveda, violated federal election law. A contemporaneous The Kansas City Star profile of Suarez had noted his history of political contributions and that some donations were made through companies or associates rather than in his own name.

The FEC complaint stated that the contributions affected '...an ongoing primary election campaign which will end on August 4, 1992', referring to the U.S presidential primary then underway in Missouri.

In 1994, the FEC investigated allegations that Suarez arranged a $25,000 contribution through an account under the name Tippins Development Ltd., which was refunded amid concerns over its legality. Additional contributions from Concorde Trading, Chemetco, and Midco, all of which were linked to Suarez and a Belgian holding company, were also routed to federal campaigns through intermediaries.

The FEC's General Counsel described these payments as 'clearly laundered money'. John Suarez was not among the individuals charged when Chemetco and several employees were indicted in 1999 for Clean Water Act violations.

== Chemetco's role in U.S. secondary copper industry collapse ==
The permanent closure of Chemetco's facility in 2001 signaled the end of large-scale secondary copper smelting in the United States. The company ceased operations on October 31, 2001, following criminal convictions for environmental violations and mounting financial pressures, and Chemetco then filed for Chapter 7 bankruptcy protection on November 13, 2001. The plant had an output of 95,000 metric tons and was operating at roughly 30% below capacity before closure.

Secondary smelters operated by Southwire, as well as Cerro Copper Products' facility, had already shut down. Between 1997 and 2001, when Chemetco closed down, approximately 200,000 metric tons of secondary refining capability vanished; output in the United States fell to zero.

Chemetco's exit was the final point in a cycle of closures mediated by market pressures as well as the substantial capital investments required to meet evolving environmental standards that operators found economically unviable.

== Operation ==
=== Main products ===
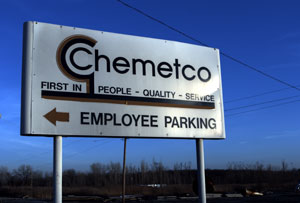
Entrance to the Chemetco site, where truckloads of copper-bearing materials arrived from industrial customers.

Chemetco was primarily a secondary smelter of copper anodes and cathodes. Its peak historic capacity was about 125,000 tonnes of refined copper annually, from an average of 250,000 tonnes of scrap copper and residues.

=== Subsidiary products and precious metals ===
The smelter also produced lead and tin ingots. Independent evaluations of the tankhouse sludges confirmed gold, silver, and other metals.

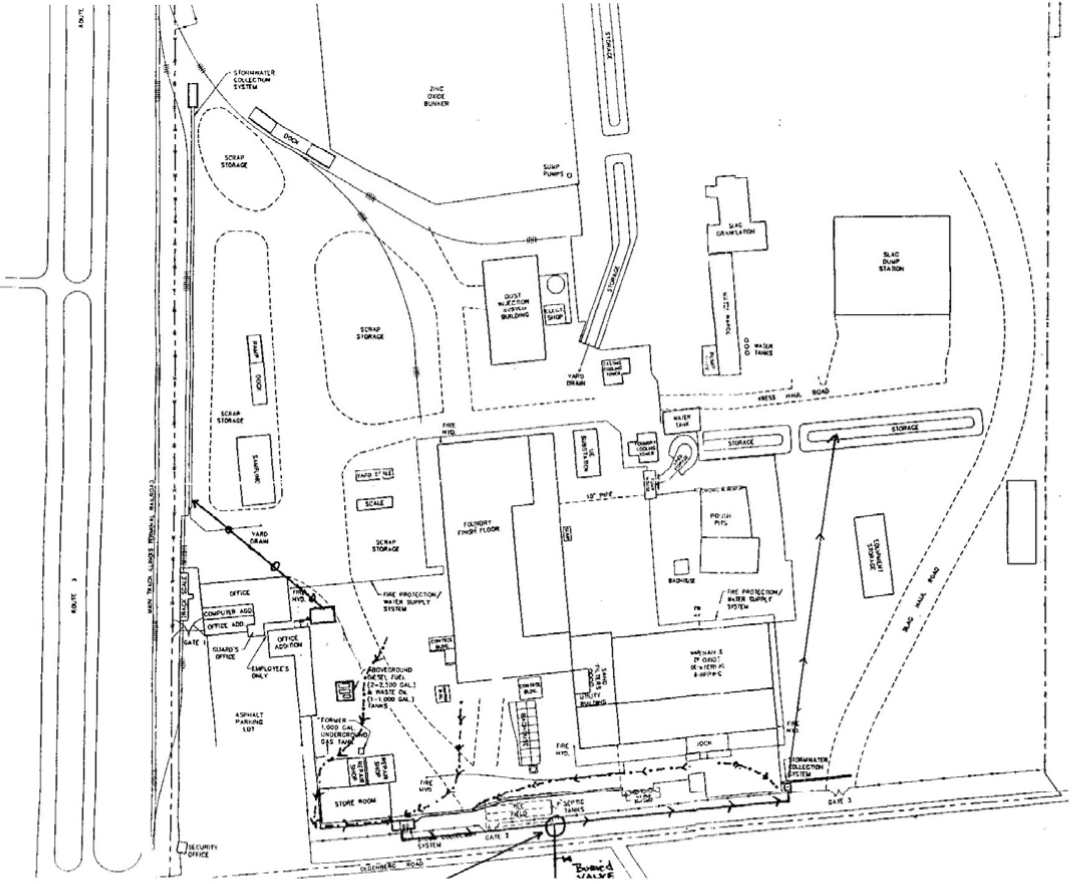
Map showing layout of Chemetco site and nearby facilities.

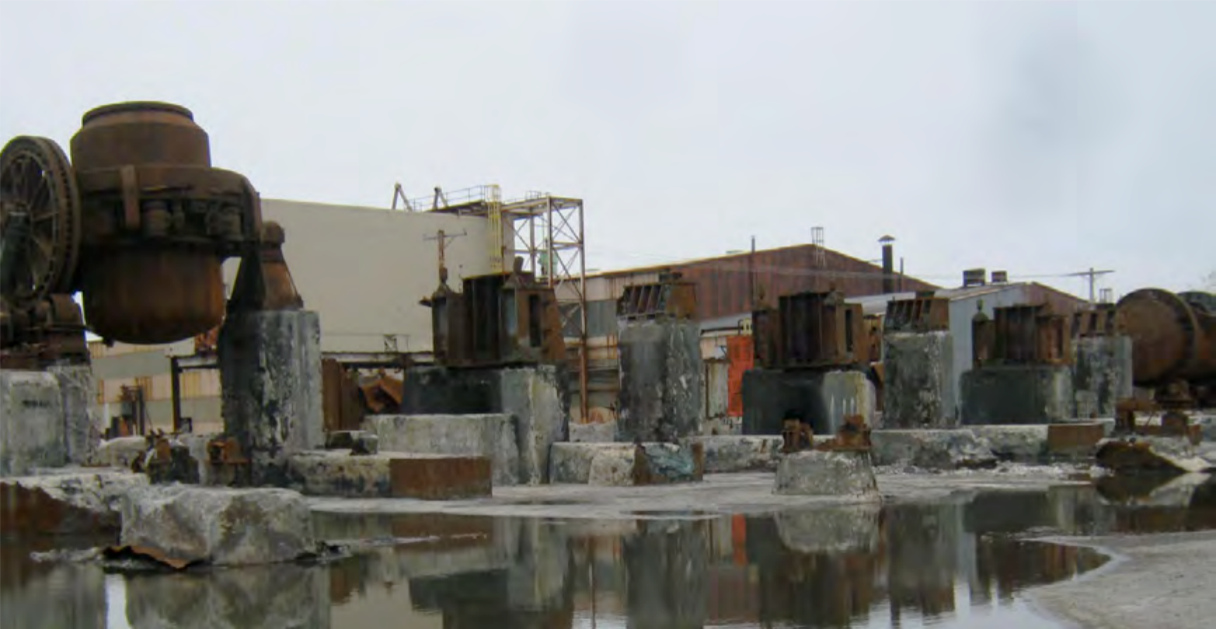
Chemetco Metallo-Chimique Kaldo converters after disassembly

=== Introduction of Kaldo /Top-blown rotary converter (TBRc) technology to secondary copper smelting ===
Chemetco appears to mark the first large-scale, continuous application of TBRc in secondary copper refining rather than steel, showing parent company Metallo to be an early adopter. Chemetco's primary rival was Noranda's Horne Smelter in Rouyn-Noranda, Quebec.

=== Characterization of by-products ===
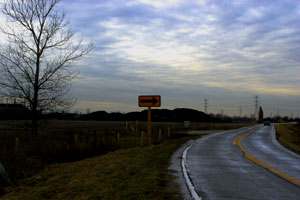
Slag pile visible from outside Chemetco site. Image taken January 2005.

Chemetco operated under state and federal environmental regulations that governed the handling of secondary materials and industrial residues. In a significant hearing in front of the Illinois Pollution Control Board (PCB) the company petitioned for an 'amended standard' that would allow it to slurry its bunker material, which it described as 'zinc oxide,' then blend it with copper and tin fines before shipment overseas. Chemetco presented this process as a means of recovering metal value from material it characterized as a product.

The PCB reviewed the proposal and ultimately, denied the petition for an amended standard; this decision made the bunker material subject to existing waste management requirements, rather than to reclassification as a "recoverable" product. Overall, this case provides one example of how Chemetco's operational approach to by-product recovery was tested and limited by the regulatory framework that governed its activities.

==== Analysis of what Chemetco described as 'zinc oxide' by-product ====
Laboratory analyses by the United States Environmental Protection Agency (EPA) determined that the material referred to by Chemetco as 'zinc oxide' was not a product at all. Rather, it was a hazardous by-product containing extremely high concentrations of lead, cadmium, and copper, along with trace elements such as antimony, cobalt, nickel, and mercury.

EPA laboratory testing found that Chemetco's by-product failed Toxicity Characteristic Leaching Procedure (TCLP) standards for lead and cadmium, classifying it as hazardous waste under federal regulations. The agency's analyses concluded that the material posed significant risks owing to toxicity as well as to its potential for leaching.

==== EPA-confirmed metal and metalloid content ====
All samples analyzed failed EPA regulatory thresholds for lead and cadmium.

==== Comparison with pure zinc oxide ====
EPA's characterization established that Chemetco's 'zinc oxide' could not be marketed or exported as a recyclable product and instead, required management as hazardous waste. This distinction highlighted the difference between genuine industrial zinc oxide and the metal-rich residues generated by Chemetco's refining operations.

The unusable waste generated by Chemetco accumulated in a conspicuous pile for decades.

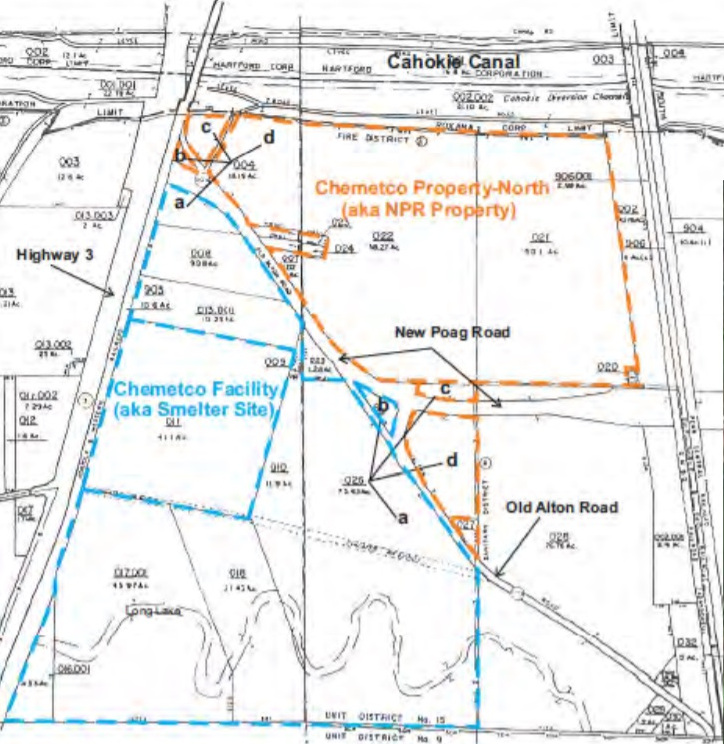
Chemetco land showing proximity to highways and railhead.

== Occupational health hazards ==
=== Systemic occupational health deficiencies ===
The findings of the NIOSH Health Hazard Evaluation showed profound and systemic failures in occupational health protection at Chemetco. Documented overexposures to arsenic, lead, and sulfuric acid, combined with contamination of eating areas, demonstrated that the facility lacked effective exposure controls and hygiene measures.

NIOSH concluded that worker exposures exceeded recognized safety limits for multiple hazardous substances, and these resulted in adverse health effects including respiratory irritation, skin damage, beryllium sensitization and chronic beryllium disease and elevated blood lead levels. These findings indicated that Chemetco fell very short of fundamental occupational health and safety standards.

=== Chronic beryllium disease ===
NIOSH investigators confirmed one case of chronic beryllium disease in a 31-year-old furnace operator who had worked at the plant for two and a half years. The worker was diagnosed with chronic berylliosis requiring lifelong steroid treatment.

The affected worker was found to be charging small quantities of metal scrap into a sample furnace without respiratory protection, and further, his job classification did not require such equipment. NIOSH found that historical beryllium concentrations at the facility exceeded recommended occupational limits, with 17 percent of company air samples from 1981 above NIOSH exposure standards.

=== Lead and other exposure hazards ===
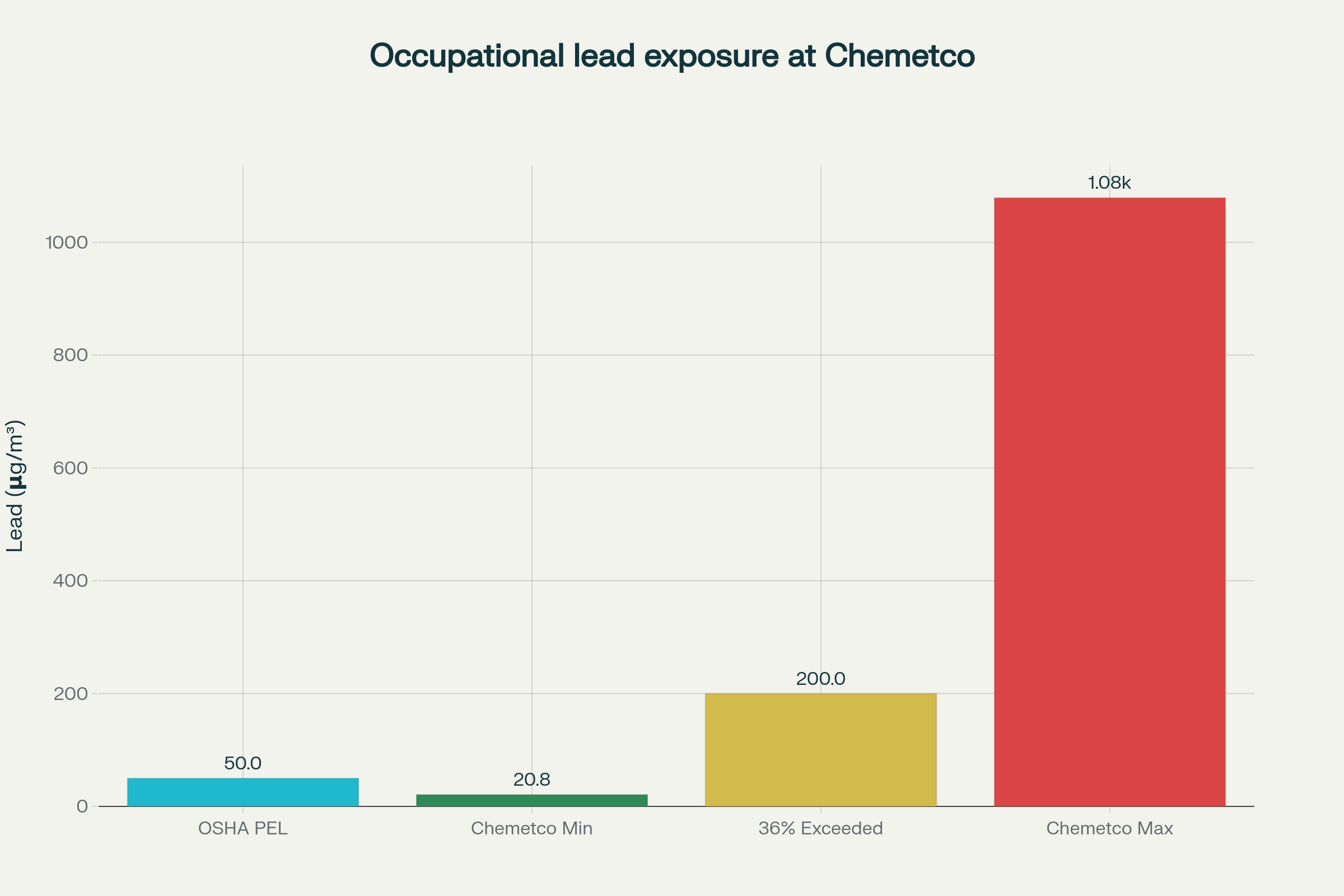
Chemetco occupational lead exposure levels visualized

NIOSH reported widespread exposure hazards across plant operations. Personal air monitoring detected lead concentrations were described by NIOSH as potentially toxic. NIOSH also noted that production areas did not have exhaust ventilation, and that workers performing charging of furnaces, sampling and scrap handling often did not use respiratory protection. Dust and metal fumes were identified as consistent exposure sources throughout smelting and refining operations.

NIOSH identified additional exposure hazards involving arsenic, lead contamination in eating areas, and sulfuric acid mist in the electrolytic tankhouse.

=== Arsenic exposure and health impact on workers ===
Arsenic contamination originated from the metallic feedstocks processed through Chemetco's secondary copper smelting operation. Copper-bearing alloys commonly contained arsenic as an impurity. During high-temperature smelting, arsenic trioxide was formed; this became volatile and concentrated in flue dust, creating multiple exposure pathways throughout the facility.

Personal air monitoring by NIOSH recorded personal overexposure to arsenic across several job categories, which pointed to howarsenic exposure was not confined to specific work areas but represented a facility-wide occupational hazard.

Epidemiological studies of copper smelter workers establish arsenic as a carcinogenic hazard in copper smelting operations.

Exposure at Chemetco occurred primarily through the inhalation of dusts and vapors generated during furnace charging and smelting. Workers in furnace operations, material handling and maintenance experienced the highest risks.

=== Contamination of eating areas ===
The NIOSH evaluation found evidence of contamination extending into non-production areas, including locations used for food and beverage consumption.

Surface sampling indicated a secondary exposure pathway through ingestion, as workers could transfer contaminated material from surfaces to their hands and mouths.

The presence of contamination in administrative areas suggested broader facility contamination. NIOSH concluded that if eating areas showed measurable levels of heavy metals, production areas, worker clothing, and protective equipment likely carried substantially higher contamination loads.

=== Adverse health affects on Chemetco's tankhouse workers ===
The tankhouse operation, where copper anodes underwent electrolytic refining to produce high-purity cathodes, presented additional hazards from sulfuric acid mist generated during electrowinning.

NIOSH medical examinations documented respiratory and skin effects among all seven tankhouse employees evaluated and found each worker reported nasal irritation and symptoms including sore throat and burning eyes. Fissuring of the skin on the hands was also common, and was caused by contact with acid-contaminated surfaces and airborne mist.

NIOSH classified sulfuric acid mist as a confirmed human carcinogen and noted that even low-level chronic exposure could contribute to elevated risks for laryngeal and lung cancer. The consistent presence of respiratory and skin irritation among tankhouse workers suggested that long-term employment under such conditions could lead to progressive health deterioration.

== Labor relations ==
In 1996, Geri Heinemeier (née Champion) filed a lawsuit against two companies, Chemetco, Inc. and Tri-Me Transportation, Inc., claiming she was sexually harassed, discriminated against because of her age, and fired in retaliation after reporting the harassment.

Heinemeier v. Chemetco, Inc. (246 F.3d 1078 (7th Cir. 2001)) was a decision of the United States Court of Appeals for the Seventh Circuit concerning joint-employer liability under Title VII of the Civil Rights Act of 1964 and the Age Discrimination in Employment Act. The court held that factual disputes about shared control of employment conditions prevented summary judgment. Instead, they required a jury to decide whether both companies concerned functioned as the plaintiff's employers.

Before the case went to trial, the district court had ruled in favor of Chemetco, deciding that it could not be held responsible because Heinemeier was legally employed by Tri-Me, not by Chemetco. The rest of the case continued against Tri-Me alone, and a jury found in Heinemeier's favor. She was awarded about $411,000 in damages for sexual harassment and in retaliation.

Heinemeier then appealed the ruling that had originally dismissed Chemetco from the case. The United States Court of Appeals for the Seventh Circuit agreed with her, finding that there was enough evidence for a jury to decide whether Chemetco and Tri-Me both acted as her employers. The appeals court sent the case back to the district court for further proceedings.

The appellate court explained that a company can be treated as an employer even if it does not issue paychecks, if it shares control over pay, benefits, or working conditions. It found that Chemetco and Tri-Me were closely connected in their operations, and that a jury could reasonably find that both companies employed Heinemeier under the 'economic reality' test used in employment discrimination cases.

== Environmental problems ==
Long before an illegal waste pipe was uncovered, Chemetco already had a thick compliance file. EPA and IEPA documents describe repeated violations through the 1980s and early 1990s. One EPA briefing put it plainly: "... a long history of criminal and civil environmental noncompliance."

=== Water ===
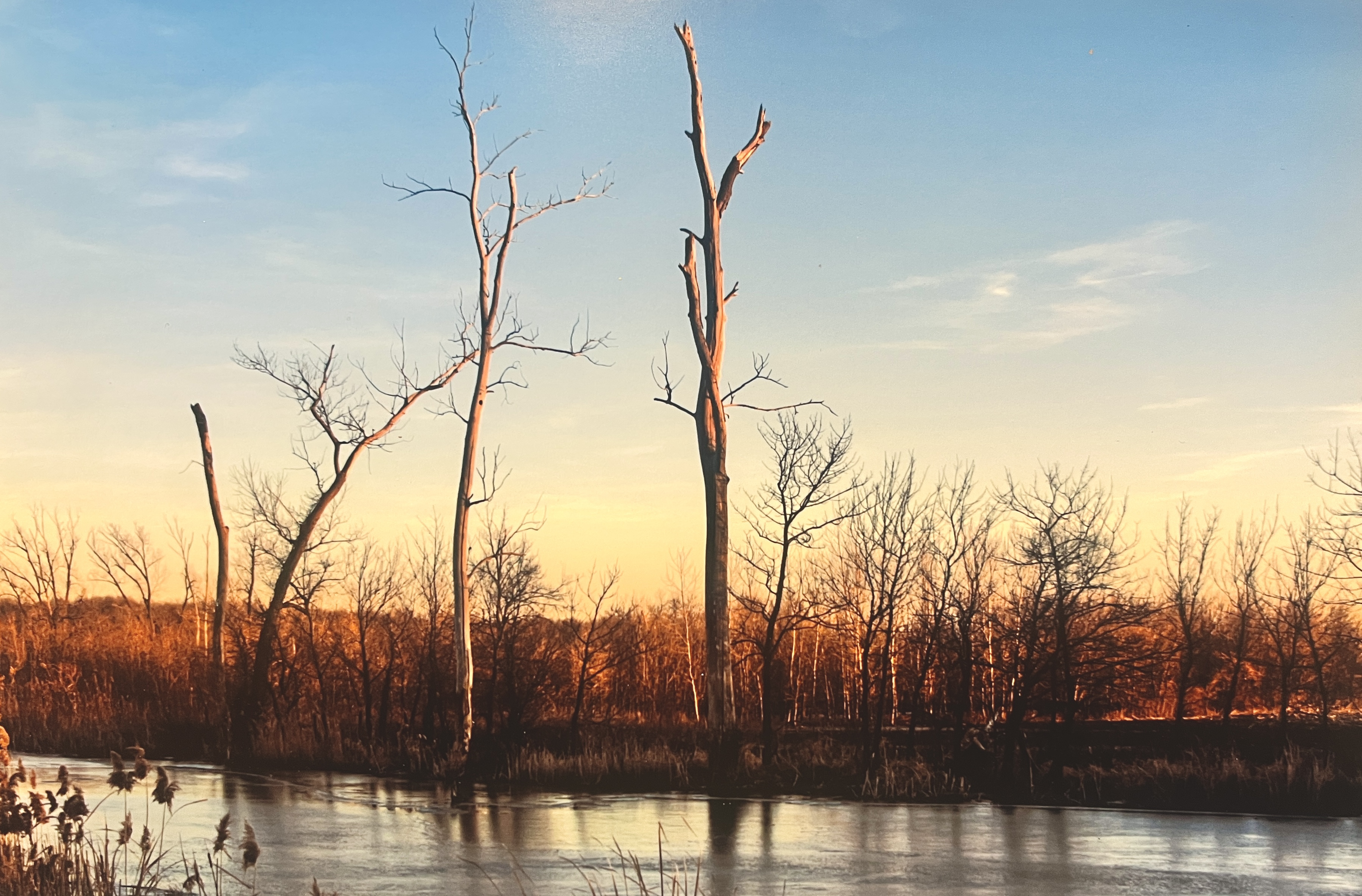
Long Lake, a tributary of the Mississippi River, where deep heavy-metal contaminated sludge from Chemetco's unpermitted and illegal pipe accumulated for ten years.

Acting on an anonymous tip-off from a security guard, on 18 September 1996, an Illinois EPA inspector found a concealed 10-inch pipe with water bubbling up from it in a ditch near the truck parking lot. EPA and IEPA came to the conclusion that it had been in use since the mid-1980s to carry process water and metal-laden runoff into Long Lake, which drains toward the Mississippi River. Under the Clean Water Act, it is a felony to pollute a navigable waterway.

Samples taken at multiple sites showed cadmium, copper, lead, and zinc and many other metals of concern at highly elevated levels. Investigators and prosecutors concluded that the pipe had been used to dispose of the accumulating piles of 'zinc oxide', which had been debarred from being sold as a recyclable material and instead, tagged as a hazardous waste.

After the site was impounded and detailed risk assessment had taken place, it was shown in a Hazard Ranking System (HRS) document that the site's surface-water pathway scored highly based. It was found that runoff from waste units migrated miles downstream.

The score was focussed on observed releases to Long Lake; however, records show that the Cahokia Diversion Channel, a canal, was within the same drainage system. A watershed plan for the American Bottom later listed the Chemetco site among Superfund sources within the Cahokia Creek (Cahokia Canal) basin.

=== Pre-1996 violations ===
EPA and IEPA records describe a pattern of violations stretching back way before the 1996 discovery. Superfund briefings note a "....long history of criminal and civil environmental noncompliance" at the site. IEPA preliminary and expanded site inspection work put together a history of multiple violations from the 1980s onward. A DOJ notice shows that a Clean Air Act civil case was lodged in 1999.

=== Air ===
The state of Illinois entered into a consent order with Chemetco in 1988, then again in 1993. This set objectives for compliance with national ambient air quality standards for lead, particulate limits, and permit conditions.These were ignored. The plant operated without a permit for its entire history.

IEPA later documented violations of the Illinois primary lead standard in 1997 and again from 1998 through 2001.

In November 1999, the United States lodged a Clean Air Act consent decree requiring Chemetco to pay a civil penalty and undertake 'injunctive measures.' These included a requirement to install a Continuous Particulate Mass Monitor system (CPMS).

A local resident testified in 1997 how acid mist and 'blue smoke' episodes from the tankhouse affected the air quality at her home and farm. Industrial-hygiene investigators in the early 1980s documented respiratory and skin irritation among tankhouse workers. These symptoms were found to be best explained by exposure to sulfuric acid fumes.

=== Long-range dioxin and furans deposition to Nunavut ===
The Commission for Environmental Cooperation study, led by Barry Commoner and others in 2000, modeled emissions from more than 44,000 North American dioxin sources, including over 5,000 individual facilities such as smelters and incinerators. Within that large inventory, Chemetco ranked among the highest single contributors to measured deposition at two Arctic receptor sites. The study's chemical fingerprinting and atmospheric transport analysis demonstrated that dioxins emitted by Chemetco were deposited at Coral Harbour and Sanikiluaq, Nunavut. Chemetco's emissions accounted for about three to four percent of total dioxin deposition recorded at those locations, which is a substantial share given the number of sources evaluated.

In the model, the ten largest individual sources together accounted for 18–26 % of total deposition, meaning that Chemetco's 3-4 % share placed it within that top group. This is roughly two hundred times higher than the mean contribution per facility. This finding is consistent with the Chemetco's admission that it used low grade materials to charge its furnaces, and inspection of inventories shows material such as insulated wire and computer scrap being charged into the furnaces in quantity.

=== Dioxin contamination on site from incinerator ashes ===
Chemetco was recognised as a potential dioxin site as early as 1987, when secondary copper smelters were included among sources evaluated in EPA's National Dioxin Study for the 1987 reference year. Records show that Chemetco intentionally charged its furnaces with large quantities of incinerator ash from one supplier over a period of time. This ash was the by-product of burning PVC-covered electrical wire to strip copper, a practice known to generate very high levels of dioxins and furans. Contemporary technical assessments explain that dioxins formed during combustion partition into flue gases and become concentrated in air-pollution-control residues such as fly ash and wet-scrubber sludge, which can later be redistributed to land. The Chemetco site itself stored large volumes of zinc-oxide scrubber sludge, consistent with such residue accumulation.

=== Land and soil ===
The Federal EPA points out the existence of a large iron-silicate slag pile and stockpiles of 'zinc oxide' scrubber sludge generated over decades by the flue-gas cleaning system. These materials contain lead, cadmium, copper, and zinc and contribute to runoff and soil contamination. EPA estimated about 452,000 cubic yards of slag and 62,000 cubic yards of scrubber sludge present at the site. An inspector described the slag heap as a 'monumental pile of hazardous waste' and it became known within the IEPA as 'Mount Slagmore.'

In 1997, Chemetco petitioned the Illinois Pollution Control Board to treat the 'zinc oxide' bunker as recyclable feedstock rather than solid waste. The Board's order described the material's origin in the scrubber system, noted its significant lead and copper content, and rejected Chemetco's request, leaving the stockpile regulated as waste. Chemetco had by this time discharged huge quantities of the material into Long Lake and surrounding wetlands. As noted, this created a sludge metres deep.

Practices leading to the discovery of dioxin on the site have been noted in the previous section and led to alarm by the authorities and detailed investigation of the risk to human health in the vicinity.

== Impact and legacy ==
Geochemical research has examined the broader consequences of Chemetco's operations in the St. Louis–Madison County region. There has also been academic study in the field of environmental justice.

=== Environmental injustice impacts in St Louis Metropolitan area ===
On a metropolitan scale, Chemetco appeared among facilities analyzed in studies of environmental risk and inequality in the St. Louis region. Those analyses used U.S. EPA Toxic Release Inventory data to map industrial emissions and found that such facilities were concentrated near lower-income communities, raising environmental-justice concerns.

The spatial analysis conducted by Abel (2008) identified Chemetco's Hartford smelter among the region's major industrial point sources in the EPA's Toxic Release Inventory dataset. In that study, 319 manufacturing sites were evaluated for potential air-pollution exposure risk, and Chemetco appeared within the upper tier of modeled emissions for the St. Louis metropolitan area.

Together, these metropolitan-scale assessments and later geochemical investigations illustrate how the effects of Chemetco's operations extended from the regional level, through patterns of industrial inequality, right down to measurable ecological impacts in local waterways.

=== Chemetco fingerprinted in back-trajectories of heavy metals ===
Scientists have described aspects of Chemetco's environmental legacy in Madison County, particularly at Horseshoe Lake, through rigorous geochemical methods. These have allowed researchers to trace back-trajectories of heavy metal contamination pointing directly to the smelter.

See also section on impact of airborne Dioxin reaching vulnerable receptor communities in Nunavut

== Prosecution and conviction ==
=== Discovery of the concealed discharge ===
Between 1986 and 1996 Chemetco operated a secondary copper refining facility at Hartford, Illinois, which was later found to have discharged untreated wastewater through a hidden pipe into wetlands leading to the Mississippi River. The pipe was not shown on site diagrams and its exposed sections were covered with straw, but after a tip-off, it was discovered by an Illinois Environmental Protection Agency field manager on September 18, 1996, along with a valve which enabled it to be shut off at the distal end.

The pipe, known to employees as 'the mystery pipe to nowhere', was an open secret within the plant and was used before its discovery by IEPA for about ten years to dispose of toxic waste into nearby wetlands. Its exposure triggered a multi-agency criminal investigation involving the Illinois Environmental Protection Agency, the Environmental Protection Agency's Criminal Investigation Division, the Illinois State Police, the FBI and the U.S. Army Criminal Investigation Command.

Its existence had allowed the plant to bypass permitted outfalls and monitoring systems resulting in unreported releases of heavy metals including lead and cadmium.

=== Charges, plea, and sentencing ===
Chemetco, its president and several employees were indicted for conspiracy, knowing violations of the Clean Water Act and making false statements to federal officials. The company pleaded guilty to conspiring to violate and knowingly violating the Act, and entered a plea of nolo contendere to making false statements, admitting that the concealed pipe had been used during the charged period.

=== Legal precedent and appeal ===
On appeal, Chemetco argued that the number of violation days, used to decide the size of its fine, should have been found by a jury beyond a reasonable doubt. However, the Seventh Circuit held that the number of days was a sentencing factor, not an element of the offense, and so it could be decided by the judge weighing up the evidence. This ruling affirmed Chemetco's sentence and established a precedent on the treatment of "per-day" penalties under the Clean Water Act. Since then, legal analyses have cited the case as a leading authority in environmental criminal law and sentencing.

The decision made it clear that when penalties are based on each day of a violation, a district court is responsible for deciding how long the violation lasted and the size of the fines, and that this applies even when the financial stakes are very large.

The company's criminal conviction and subsequent bankruptcy left the Hartford site abandoned, leading to its eventual designation and management under federal oversight.

== Denis L. Feron ==
Feron served for several decades as Chemetco's president. Before establishing the Hartford plant in 1970, Feron owned Metallo Chimique in Belgium.

In April 1999, Feron and six junior employees acting under his direction were indicted on federal charges for long-term violations of the Clean Water Act. These centered on the concealed pipeline that discharged contaminated wastewater into wetlands near the Mississippi River. Feron did not appear in court and left the United States, remaining abroad during the ensuing proceedings. Because there was no extradition agreement with Belgium, he was at liberty to escape trial.

In December 2008 the U.S. Environmental Protection Agency's Criminal Investigation Division placed him on its 'Most Wanted' fugitives list, describing him as a corporate officer who had evaded prosecution for nearly a decade.

Feron voluntarily returned in 2010 and entered a pretrial diversion agreement in the U.S. District Court for the Southern District of Illinois. As part of the settlement he paid US$500,000 in restitution toward site cleanup. Once payment was completed, the charges against him were dismissed.

== Superfund ==
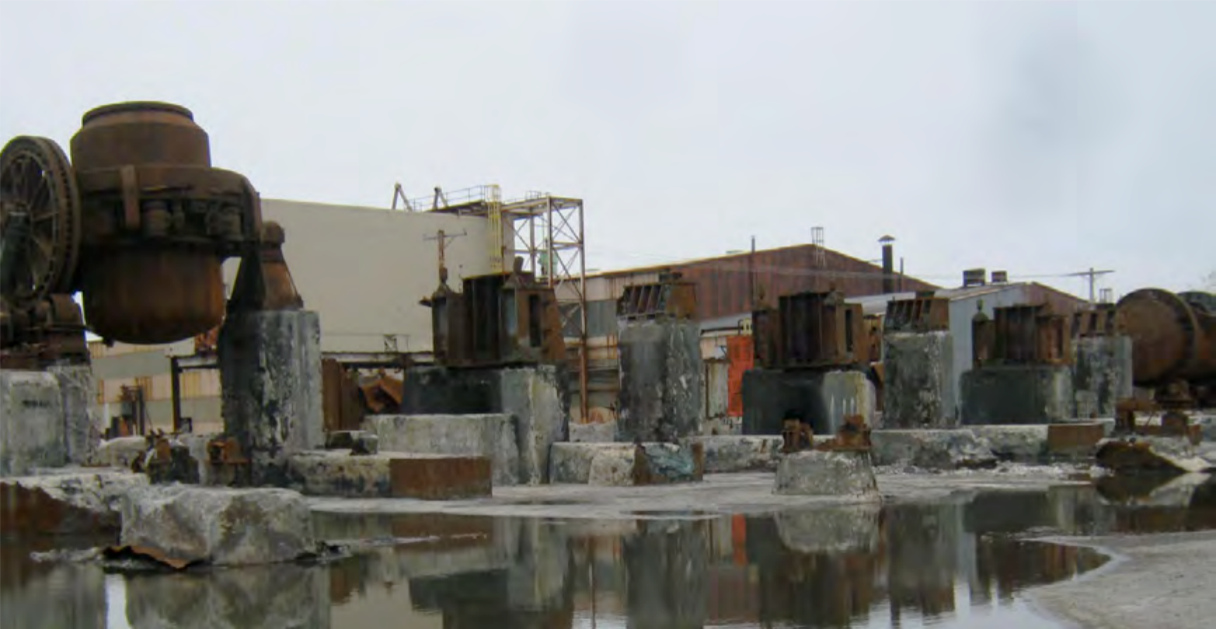
Former TBRC units after removal at the Chemetco site. U.S. EPA photograph.

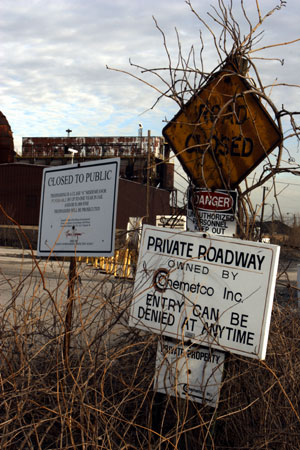
Chemetco signs

The former Chemetco facility was added to the EPA's National Priorities List on March 2, 2010. The listing made the site eligible for long-term cleanup under the federal Superfund program.

Following the company's bankruptcy in 2001, there was no viable owner to carry out cleanup. The U.S. Environmental Protection Agency (EPA) and the Illinois Environmental Protection Agency (IEPA) conducted early stabilization work, including demolition of several structures and fencing off the main industrial area. A 2015 Administrative Order on Consent (AOC) established the framework for a Remedial Investigation and Feasibility Study (RI/FS) to define the contamination and evaluate cleanup options.

The site remains under EPA oversight with restricted access. It still contains large amounts of waste material, including slag and residues from copper smelting operations. Elevated levels of copper, cadmium, lead, and zinc are present in soil, sediment and water on and near the site.

Since the site was tagged for Superfund remedy, large volumes of metal-bearing material have been processed and removed under EPA and trustee supervision. This included recovery and sale of copper-rich slag and other residues for recycling. In February 2018, the Chemetco Site PRP Group filed what is described as a 'contribution complaint' in the United States District Court (Chemetco Site PRP Group v. A Square Systems, Inc., et al., Civil Action No. 3:18-cv-00179). The group was made up of companies that had earlier entered into a settlement with the EPA to contribute to site cleanup. The complaint named more than 300 firms shown to have supplied copper-bearing scrap or waste between 1969 and 2001. The PRP Group sought to recover part of its contribution and to share liability for future cleanup costs under the Comprehensive Environmental Response, Compensation, and Liability Act (CERCLA).

The defendants ranged from small regional scrapyards to Fortune 500 multinational corporations. The litigation is notable for its scale, involving hundreds of defendants across multiple industries.

== See also ==
- Air pollution in the United States
- Anaconda Copper
- Asarco
- Beryllium disease
- CERCLA
- Clean Water Act
- CERCLA
- Copper
- Copper industry
- Copper recycling
- Copper smelting
- Corporate crime
- Denis L. Feron
- Environmental crime
- Environmental impact of mining
- Environmental issues in Canada
- Environmental justice
- Illinois Environmental Protection Agency
- Kennecott Utah Copper
- La Oroya
- Lead poisoning
- List of Superfund sites in Illinois
- National Priorities List
- Nunavut (ᓄᓇᕗᑦ)
- Occupational safety and health
- Phelps Dodge
- Pollution in the United States
- Rio Tinto Group
- Soil contamination
- Superfund
- Toxic Substances Control Act of 1976
- Toxic waste
- Trail Smelter dispute
- United States Environmental Protection Agency
- Water pollution in the United States
