= David P. Currie =

American lawyer (1936–2007)

- Born: May 29, 1936; Macon, Georgia, U.S.
- Died: October 15, 2007 (aged 71); Chicago, Illinois, U.S.
- Education: University of Chicago (BA); Harvard University (LLB)
- Spouse: Barbara Flynn (m. 1960)
- Children: 2
- Scientific career
- Fields: Constitutional law
- Workplaces: University of Chicago Law School

David P. Currie (May 29, 1936 – October 15, 2007) was an American legal scholar who was the Edward H. Levi Distinguished Professor of Law at the University of Chicago Law School, noted for his histories of the Constitution in Congress and the Supreme Court, his casebooks on federal courts and conflict of laws. He was the son of legal scholar Brainerd Currie. His wife was Barbara Flynn Currie, Majority Leader of the Illinois House of Representatives.

== Biography ==
Born on May 29, 1936, in Macon, Georgia, Currie earned a B.A. from the University of Chicago in 1957, and a LL.B. from Harvard Law School in 1960, where he was an editor of the Harvard Law Review. After clerking for Judge Henry Friendly and then Justice Felix Frankfurter, he joined the University of Chicago Law School faculty in 1962. His books include The Constitution of the United States: A Primer for the People (1988, 2nd ed. 2000); The Constitution in the Supreme Court: The First Hundred Years, 1789-1888 (1985); The Constitution in the Supreme Court: The Second Century, 1888-1986 (1990); the four-volume The Constitution in Congress; and The Constitution of the Federal Republic of Germany (1994). He was also the author of the 1970 Illinois Environmental Protection Act and the first chair of the Illinois Pollution Control Board.

The four volumes of The Constitution in Congress are The Constitution in Congress: The Federalist Period, 1789-1801 (1997); The Constitution in Congress: The Jeffersonians, 1801-1829 (2001); The Constitution in Congress: Democrats and Whigs, 1829-1861 (2005); and The Constitution in Congress: Descent into the Maelstrom, 1829-1861 (2005).

== Personal life ==
From 1960 until his death in 2007, Currie was married to Barbara Flynn Currie, who later became first female Majority Leader of the Illinois House of Representatives, a position she held from 1997 to 2019, as was also both the longest serving Illinois House majority as well the longest serving female member in the history of the Illinois General Assembly, having served from 1979 until 2019. They had two: Stephen and Margaret.

== Today ==
Currie’s voice reading part of the Constitution is part of the introduction to the “Divided Argument” podcast hosted by Will Baude and Dan Epps.

== See also ==
- List of law clerks for the second seat of the Supreme Court of the United States
