= Michael Noland =

American politician (born 1960)

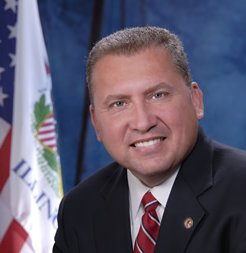

Member of the Illinois Senate from the 22nd district
- In office January 9, 2007 – January 10, 2017
- Preceded by: Steve Rauschenberger
- Succeeded by: Cristina Castro

Personal details
- Born: December 5, 1960 (age 65) Lynn, MA, U.S.
- Party: Democratic
- Spouse: Veronica Noland (m. 1997)
- Profession: Attorney

Michael Noland (born December 5, 1960) is a former Democratic member of the Illinois Senate, representing the 22nd District from 2007 to 2017. In November 2018, he was elected Kane County Circuit Court Judge in the 16th Judicial Circuit of Illinois.

Noland earned his bachelor's degree and M.B.A. from the University of Illinois at Chicago and his J.D. degree from John Marshall Law School. He served as a Navy Corpsman while on active duty at the Great Lakes Naval Hospital and in the Reserves with the United States Marine Corps. He resides in Elgin with his wife Veronica and their two children.

== Early life ==
Although raised in various places around the United States, Mike has called Elgin home for 38 years. He started shining shoes at the age of eight, and had to work odd jobs all throughout high school to help his family with expenses.

After graduating from Elgin High School in 1978, Noland worked as a security guard while taking classes at night at Elgin Community College. In 1984, he enlisted in the United States Navy as an E-3 (Seaman) and graduated from Hospital Corps School in 1985. Noland then went to Camp Pendleton where he went through Marine Corps training and served as a Corpsman, attached to NTC Great Lakes, until he got out in 1993. His unit was on call for the First Persian Gulf War but was never deployed.

Noland attended school at the University of Illinois-Chicago where he earned a B.A. in 1991. Seeking to continue his education, he pursued an Juris Doctor degree at John Marshall Law School while driving a limousine at night to help pay for school. He earned his J.D. in 1996.

He also earned his M.B.A. at the University of Illinois-Chicago in 2001.

Noland has worked as a public defender and an attorney in private practice, representing hundreds of clients, many of them pro-bono.

== Early races ==
In 2002, Noland ran for the Illinois House of Representatives. However, he lost the November general election to Republican Douglas Hoeft, 7,153 to Hoeft's 10,199.

Despite the loss, Noland tried again for the Illinois House, this time challenging Republican Ruth Munson. The General Election results ended up being so close as to create demand, from a third party, for a recount. As the election results were recounted, Munson's lead narrowed. When the results were counted, Noland's margin of defeat was only 387 votes.

In 2006, Senator Steve Rauschenberger announced he would be leaving his position as Illinois Senator for the 22nd Legislative District as he pursued the position of Lieutenant Governor. Noland was the Democratic nominee to replace Rauschenberger and faced Republican Mayor Billie Roth in the general election. During the campaign, Noland promised to support property tax relief as local county boards continued to increase property taxes. Noland defeated Roth by a 56%-44% margin.

== Senate committee assignments ==
In the Illinois General Assembly, Noland served on the Judiciary and Public Health Committees while he chaired the Criminal Law Committee. He also served on the Energy Committee, Committee of the Whole, Licensed Activities Committee, and the Subcommittee on Special Issues and chaired the Transparency Subcommittee.

== Ethics reform ==
Noland was a co-sponsor of Senate Bill 1961 which called for the end of a long time practice of elected officials placing their names on taxpayer funded signs and other electronic messaging. Senate Bill 1406 would place a limit on campaign contributions for various campaign committees. Previously, Illinois had no regulations limiting the amount a contributor could give to a campaign committee. Noland also was a sponsor on Senate Joint Resolution Constitutional Amendment 17 (SJRCA17), which would give Illinois residents the power to recall elected members of the Executive Branch and then provide for a special election. SJRCA17 failed to pass. SJRCA17 not only dealt with the recall of Governors but every elected official down to the municipal level and erected no safeguards to ward off those who would simply wish to recall a Governor on the basis of being from the opposing party.

On October 15, 2009, during a veto session of the Illinois General Assembly, the Illinois Senate passed House Joint Resolution Constitutional Amendment 31. The bill was then sent to Governor Pat Quinn for his signature and signed into law. HJRCA31 grants Illinois voters the option, by way of the November ballot, to ratify an amendment to the State Constitution that would allow for Gubernatorial recalls. Noland's legislation was featured as the main article in the Chicago Tribune's "Clout Street" the following day, October 16, 2009.

== Campaign for Congress ==
When Congresswoman Tammy Duckworth announced she was going to run for the US Senate. Noland said that he would explore running to replace Duckworth. After exploring a campaign in the summer of 2015 he announced that he would run for the Democratic nomination, leaving his position in the Illinois Senate. He was defeated in the Democratic primary by Raja Krishnamoorthi.

== Judicial election ==
With the retirement of Judge David R. Akemann in the 16th Judicial District of Illinois, Noland ran for the vacant seat on the bench. Of the 253,841 registered voters in Kane County, 28,675 participated in the Democratic primary of March 20, 2018, for a turnout of 11.30%. Noland won the nomination with 15,582 votes (54.34%) to 8,929 (31.14%) for Lark Cowart.

Noland distinguished his campaign for judge by using a Segway to visit voters at their doors. In the General Election of November 6, 2018, Kane County reported that 314,170 registered voters cast 172,034 ballots for a 54.76% turnout. Noland received 84,894 (49.35%) votes while Republican Thomas M. ("Tom") Hartwell received 80,135 (46.58%) votes.
