= JoAnn D. Osmond =

American politician

Member of the Illinois House of Representatives from the 61st district
- In office December 2002 – July 2014
- Preceded by: Andrea S. Moore
- Succeeded by: Sheri Jesiel

Personal details
- Party: Republican
- Spouse: Timothy H. Osmond (1980-02, widowed)
- Children: Two
- Occupation: Retired

JoAnn D. Osmond (April 6, 1946) is a former Republican member of the Illinois House of Representatives, representing the 61st district from 2002 to 2014. She is also the owner of Osmond Insurance Services Ltd. Previously, Osmond served as Chairwoman of the Lake County Republican Central Committee from 1996 to 1998.
