= Robert W. Churchill =

American politician and lawyer (born 1947)

Robert Churchill

Majority Leader of the Illinois House of Representatives
- In office 1995–1997
- Preceded by: Jim McPike
- Succeeded by: Barbara Flynn Currie

Member of the Illinois House of Representatives from the 62nd district
- In office 2003–2007
- Preceded by: Tim Osmond (redistricted)
- Succeeded by: Sandy Cole
- In office 1983–1999
- Preceded by: District created
- Succeeded by: Tim Osmond

Personal details
- Born: April 10, 1947 (age 79) Waukegan, Illinois
- Party: Republican
- Children: Three

Robert W. Churchill (born April 10, 1947) is a former American politician and lawyer.

Churchill was born April 10, 1947 in Waukegan, Illinois. Churchill received his bachelor's degree in history and political science from Northwestern University and his Juris Doctor degree from University of Iowa College of Law. He practiced law at Grayslake Law Firm in Grayslake, Illinois, since 1972, and lived in Lake Villa, Illinois. He currently lives in Grayslake, Illinois and, as of 2024, still practices law.

Churchill was involved with the Republican Party. He served in numerous party positions, eventually chairing the Lake County Republican Central Committee. He was elected to the Republican National Nominating Convention as a Delegate in 1980, 1992, 1996 & 2004 (Secretary of the Illinois Delegation in 1992 & 1996) and as an Alternate Delegate in 1984.

He was elected and served as a Lake Villa Township Trustee from 1981 to 1983.

In the 1982 general election, Churchill defeated Robert Gesiakowski of Antioch. Churchill served in the Illinois House of Representatives from 1983 to 1999 and from 2003 to 2007. After the Republicans took control of the House during the Republican Revolution, Churchill was named Majority Leader by Speaker Lee A. Daniels.

In 1998, Churchill ran for the Republican nomination for Illinois Secretary of State, ultimately losing to former state legislator Al Salvi. After the 2001 decennial redistricting process, Churchill successfully ran for the Illinois House of Representatives from the 62nd district. Churchill continued in the Illinois House until a failed bid for the Republican nomination to face Democratic incumbent Melissa Bean in Illinois's 8th congressional district. Churchill lost the primary to David McSweeney.
