= Barbara Flynn Currie =

American politician (1940–2026)

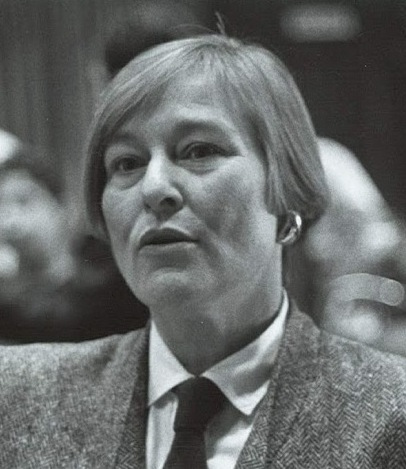
- Currie in 1987

Majority Leader of the Illinois House of Representatives
- In office January 8, 1997 – January 9, 2019
- Preceded by: Bob Churchill
- Succeeded by: Greg Harris

Member of the Illinois House of Representatives
- In office January 1979 – January 2019
- Preceded by: Robert E. Mann
- Succeeded by: Curtis Tarver
- Constituency: 24th district (1979–1983); 26th district (1983–1993); 25th district (1993–2019)

Personal details
- Born: May 3, 1940 La Crosse, Wisconsin, U.S.
- Died: April 16, 2026 (aged 85)
- Party: Democratic
- Spouse: David Currie (m. 1960; died 2007)
- Children: 2
- Education: University of Chicago (BA, MA)

Barbara Flynn Currie (May 3, 1940 – April 16, 2026) was an American politician who served as a Democratic member of the Illinois House of Representatives from 1979 to 2019. She served as the majority leader from 1997 to 2019. She was the first woman to hold this position, and is also the longest serving Illinois House majority leader to date. Flynn Currie's forty years as a member of the Illinois General Assembly is the longest tenure of any woman to serve in the Illinois General Assembly.

== Background and education ==
Barbara Flynn grew up in the Hyde Park neighborhood of Chicago. Her father, Frank Flynn, taught at the University of Chicago School of Social Service Administration. She graduated from the University of Chicago Laboratory Schools in 1958, and enrolled at the College of the University of Chicago in the same year. She left the university in 1959 and married David P. Currie in 1960. He died in 2007. David, a native of Macon, Georgia, had graduated from the college in 1957, and soon enrolled at Harvard Law School. As David was a law student and held jobs as a law clerk, the Curries lived outside Chicago until 1962, when David became an instructor at the University of Chicago Law School. The Curries had two children: Stephen and Margaret. David, who became a revered legal scholar and teacher, died in 2007.

She slowly finished her undergraduate degree at the University of Chicago, balancing her studies with caring for her children. She graduated from the college in 1968, followed by a master's degree in political science from the same university in 1973. She was politically active, working on the campaign for Michael Shakman, a Chicago-based attorney and activist who ran for delegate to the state's 1970 constitutional convention.

Currie was a member of the Chicago League of Women Voters, of which she also served as vice president from 1965 to 1969, the Illinois Women's Institute for Leadership, Women United for South Shore, and the Board of the ACLU of Illinois.

== House of Representatives ==
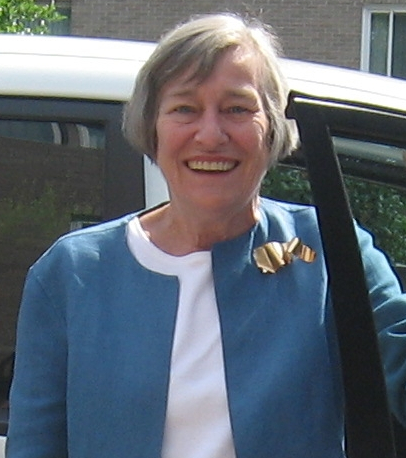
Currie in 2010

Currie was elected to the Illinois House of Representatives in 1978. She ran in the 24th district, where incumbent Robert E. Mann had announced his retirement. At the time, women comprised only 13% of the General Assembly. In 1997, Currie became the majority leader of the Illinois House of Representatives, the first woman to hold that position. On September 14, 2017, she announced she would not stand for reelection in 2018.

=== Political positions ===
Currie co-sponsored bills that established the Illinois earned income tax credit, repealed capital punishment, and legalized same-sex marriage.

=== Impeachment of Rod Blagojevich ===
In December 2008, following the arrest of Illinois Governor Rod Blagojevich, Currie was named by Illinois House Speaker Michael Madigan as the chairperson of the Illinois House committee to investigate Governor Blagojevich for possible impeachment as a result of federal corruption charges against him. Blagojevich was subsequently impeached by the House and removed from office by the Illinois Senate.

== Later career ==
WBEZ reported that in December 2018, Currie appeared at the top of a "clout list" from an aide to House Speaker Michael Madigan, who had recommended several people to fill roles in the administration of newly elected governor J. B. Pritzker.

In April 2019, Pritzker appointed Currie to the Illinois Pollution Control Board. Her husband, David, had created the board 50 years before her appointment, and served as its first chairman. She also served as the board's chairman, earning an annual salary of nearly $124,000. Currie knew that Madigan had recommended her. However, she denied his clout had played a role, instead pointing to her legislative track record and interactions with the governor.

== Death ==
Currie died on April 16, 2026, at the age of 85. Her death was confirmed by Illinois Speaker of the House Emanuel "Chris" Welch and Illinois Governor J.B. Pritzker, who were among those who paid tribute.

Illinois House of Representatives
Preceded by Bob Churchill	Majority Leader of the Illinois House of Representatives; 1997–2019	Succeeded by Greg Harris
