= Douglas Hoeft =

American politician (1942–2002)

Member of the Illinois House of Representatives
- In office 1993 – December 17, 2002
- Succeeded by: Ruth Munson

Personal details
- Born: Douglas Laton Hoeft; May 26, 1942 Rochester, Minnesota, U.S.
- Died: December 17, 2002 (aged 60) Chicago, Illinois, U.S.
- Party: Republican
- Spouse: Elizabeth Bayless (m. 1964)
- Children: 2
- Parent(s): William Frank Hoeft; Janet Smith
- Education: Denison University (BA); Northwestern University; Northern Illinois University (EdD)
- Profession: Politician, educator

Douglas Laton Hoeft (May 26, 1942 – December 17, 2002) was a Republican member of the Illinois House of Representatives.

Hoeft was born May 26, 1942, in Rochester, Minnesota. He earned a Bachelor of Arts at Denison University and a doctorate of education at Northern Illinois University. Hoeft became the Kane County Regional Superintendent of Schools from 1987 to 1993. For a time prior to his political career, he was a coal miner. He served on the Illinois RiverWatch Network Steering Committee.

Hoeft died December 17, 2002, the same day as fellow Republican Timothy H. Osmond. He was succeeded by Ruth Munson, who took office December 30, 2002.
