= Greg Harris (politician) =

American politician

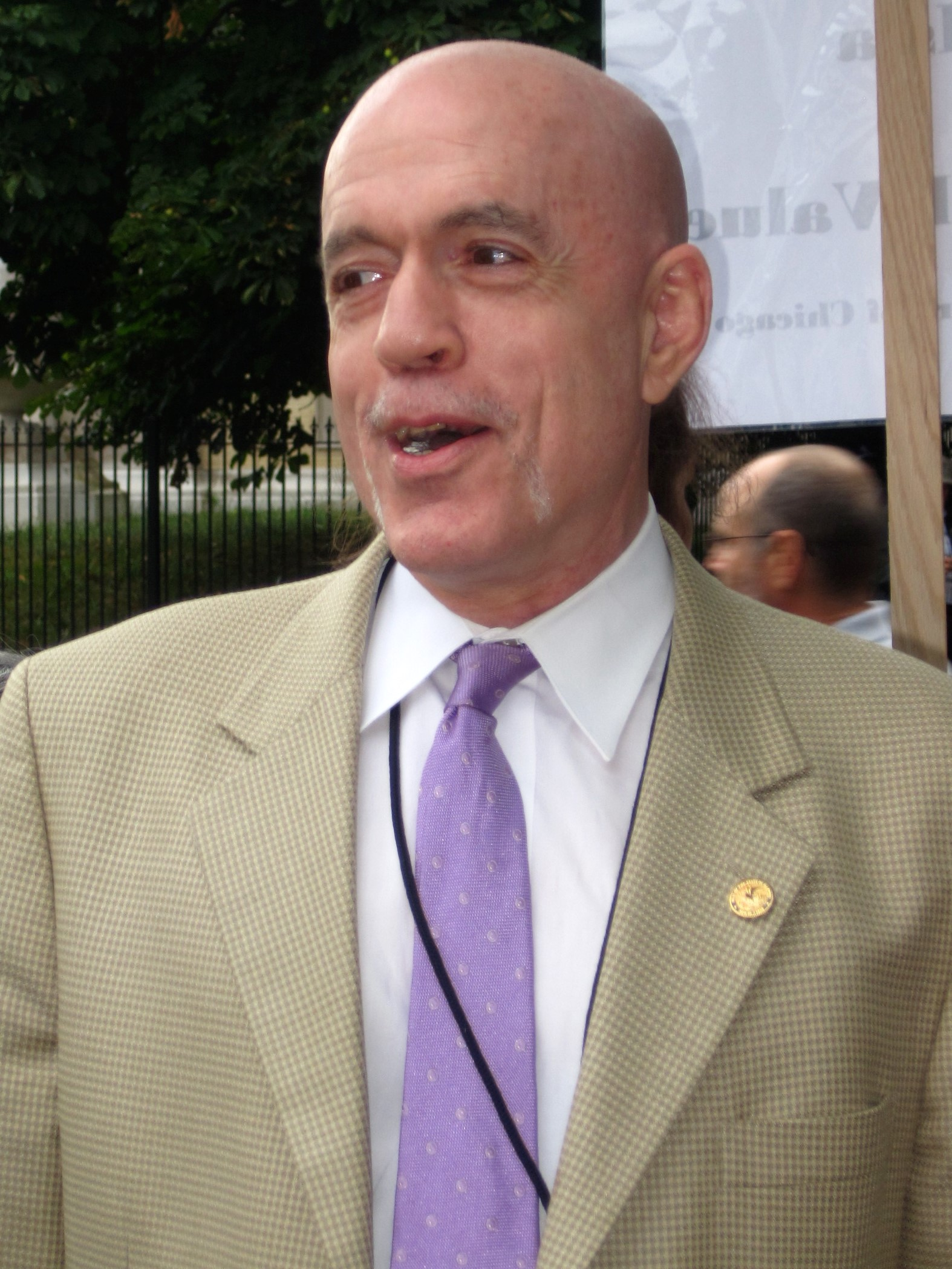
- Harris in 2009

Majority Leader of the Illinois House of Representatives
- In office January 9, 2019 – January 11, 2023
- Preceded by: Barbara Flynn Currie
- Succeeded by: Robyn Gabel

Member of the Illinois House of Representatives from the 13th district
- In office December 1, 2006 – January 11, 2023
- Preceded by: Larry McKeon
- Succeeded by: Hoan Huynh

Personal details
- Born: June 5, 1955 (age 71) Denver, Colorado, U.S.
- Party: Democratic
- Education: University of Colorado, Boulder (BA)

Gregory S. Harris (born June 5, 1955) is an American politician who served as a Democratic member of the Illinois House of Representatives in the 13th district from 2007 to 2023. He sponsored the Acts which legalized civil unions and same sex marriage in Illinois and rose to become House Majority Leader in 2019. Harris retired as Leader, not seeking reelection to the House in 2022.

== Early life and career ==
Harris is an alumnus of the University of Colorado at Boulder. He then worked for social service agencies. He served in senior positions with the National Home Furnishings Association. He then became chief of staff for Chicago alderman Mary Ann Smith, a position in which he served for 14 years.

== Legislative tenure ==
Larry McKeon, who had held the seat for five terms, announced his intention to retire from the legislature in July 2006. He had, though, already been re-elected in the March primary election to be the Democratic candidate on the November general-election ballot, and it fell to the local Democratic committeemen to select his successor to appear on the ballot. Harris, like McKeon, is both openly gay and HIV-positive. He was elected in November 2006. No Republican filed for the District 13 seat. He also ran unopposed for re-election in 2008.

In 2010, Harris sponsored The Illinois Religious Freedom Protection & Civil Union Act (SB1716), which was signed into law on January 31, 2011, by Governor Pat Quinn. The act established civil unions in Illinois.

In 2013, Harris was the lead sponsor in the IL House of the Religious Freedom and Marriage Fairness Act, signed into law by Governor Quinn, an act which legalized same-sex marriage in Illinois that went into effect in June 2014.

On January 10, 2019, Harris became the House Majority Leader.

On November 29, 2021, Harris announced that he would not seek reelection.

As of July 3, 2022, Representative Harris is a member of the following Illinois House committees:

- Personnel & Pensions Committee (HPPN)
- (Chairman of) Rules Committee (HRUL)

== Electoral history ==
Illinois 13th Representative District General Election, 2006
Party	Candidate	Votes	%
Democratic	Gregory Harris	19,865	100.0
Total votes		19,865	100.0

Illinois 13th Representative District General Election, 2008
Party	Candidate	Votes	%
Democratic	Gregory Harris (incumbent)	31,013	100.0
Total votes		31,013	100.0

Illinois 13th Representative District General Election, 2010
Party	Candidate	Votes	%
Democratic	Gregory Harris (incumbent)	21,617	100.0
Total votes		21,617	100.0

Illinois 13th Representative District General Election, 2012
Party	Candidate	Votes	%
Democratic	Gregory Harris (incumbent)	33,488	100.0
Total votes		33,488	100.0

Illinois 13th Representative District General Election, 2014
Party	Candidate	Votes	%
Democratic	Gregory Harris (incumbent)	22,632	100.0
Total votes		22,632	100.0

Illinois 13th Representative District General Election, 2016
Party	Candidate	Votes	%
Democratic	Gregory Harris (incumbent)	40,831	100.0
Total votes		40,831	100.0

Illinois 13th Representative District General Election, 2018
Party	Candidate	Votes	%
Democratic	Gregory Harris (incumbent)	39,456	100.0
Total votes		39,456	100.0

Illinois 13th Representative District General Election, 2020
Party	Candidate	Votes	%
Democratic	Greg Harris (incumbent)	46,016	100.0
Total votes		46,016	100.0

Illinois House of Representatives
Preceded by Barbara Flynn Currie	Majority Leader of the Illinois House of Representatives; 2019–2023	Succeeded by Robyn Gabel
