= List of Superfund sites in Illinois =

This is a list of Superfund sites in Illinois designated under the Comprehensive Environmental Response, Compensation, and Liability Act (CERCLA) environmental law. These sites are listed on the National Priorities List. 13 Sites are listed below.

== Superfund sites ==
Proposed for addition to National Priorities List
Deleted from National Priorities List
Removed proposal for addition to National Priorities List

CERCLIS ID	Name	County	Reason	Proposed	Listed	Construction completed	Partially deleted	Deleted
ILD980607055	Adams County Quincy Landfills 2&3	Adams	(39.92944°N 91.26847°W)	06/24/1988	08/30/1990	03/31/1999	N/A	N/A
ILD980996789	Ilada Energy Co.	Alexander	(37.2584°N 89.4635°W) Liquid oily wastes found on site were contaminated with VOCs, PCBs, and heavy metals including lead, arsenic, and zinc. On-site surface soils were contaminated with PCBs and heavy metals.	06/24/1988	10/04/1989	09/28/1999	N/A	01/08/2001
ILD980397079	A & F Material Reclaiming, Inc.	Cumberland	(39.2439°N 88.174°W)	12/30/1982	09/08/1983	09/24/1992	N/A	N/A
IL3210020803	Savanna Army Depot Activity	Jo Daviess	(42.21°N 90.31333°W) Soils are contaminated with metals, pesticides, explosives, lead-based paint chips, and PAHs. Groundwater is contaminated with various pesticides, explosives, solvents, and petroleum-related contaminants. Sediments and surface water are contaminated with various explosives, PAHs, and metals. Multiple areas throughout the facility contain munitions and explosives of concern/unexploded ordnance (MEC/UXO).	10/15/1984	03/13/1989	N/A	N/A	N/A
ILD000802827	Outboard Marine Corporation	Lake	(42.36528°N 87.82111°W) An engine construction plant released hydraulic fluids into the ground and harbor, which contained PCB. Dredging of the harbor and soil removal have been completed, and decontamination of the isolated soil continues. During cleanup, it was discovered that the site contained additional contamination on the former Waukegan Coke Plant property. Soil removal there is also complete.	12/30/1982	09/08/1983	N/A	N/A	N/A
ILD003817137	Petersen Sand & Gravel	Lake	(42.31583°N 87.9537°W) The site of illegal dumping of paint waste and solvents. Cleanup was completed, and it was removed from the National Priorities List in 1991, and redeveloped as the Independence Grove Forest Preserve.	10/15/1984	06/10/1986	09/12/1989	N/A	02/11/1991
ILD005443544	Johns-Manville Corporation	Lake	(42.38666°N 87.81166°W) An asbestos-disposal site. The area has been covered in >24 inches of soil, but areas outside the Johns-Manville property have problems with asbestos contamination, including other beachfront areas near the Waukegan and Zion. The site will be redeveloped as a soccer and baseball complex.	12/30/1982	09/08/1983	12/31/1991	N/A	N/A
ILD980500102	Yeoman Creek Landfill	Lake	(42.38888°N 87.84861°W) The lack of a bottom liner allowed leachate to enter the local groundwater.	06/24/1988	03/31/1989	09/23/2005	N/A	N/A
ILD980605836	H.O.D. Landfill	Lake	(42.4753°N 88.0819°W) Groundwater was contaminated with vinyl chloride.	09/18/1985	02/21/1990	06/29/2001	N/A	N/A
ILD048843809	Chemetco	Madison	(38.835°N 90.095°W) Site contains over 450,000 cubic yards of waste slag and over 60,000 cu yd of zinc oxide. The materials contain elevated levels of cadmium, copper and lead. Sediments in nearby wetlands and Long Lake also have elevated levels of the same metals.		03/04/2010	–	–	–
IL0210090049	Joliet Army Ammunition Plant Load-Assembly-Packing Area	Will	(41.3662°N 88.0772°W) Site of federal ammunitions plant polluted with base neutral acids, metals, nitroaromatics, PCBs, and petroleum hydrocarbon. Physical cleanup has been completed, but site remains on the NPL list.	04/10/1985	03/13/1989	09/29/2008	N/A	N/A
IL7213820460	Joliet Army Ammunition Plant Manufacturing Area	Will	Soil contaminated with explosives and metals, primarily TNT, tetryl, DNT, and lead. Groundwater plumes contaminated with explosives, VOCs, and metals.	10/15/1984	07/22/1987	09/10/2008	N/A	N/A
ILD053219259	Acme Solvent Reclaiming, Inc. (Morristown Plant)	Winnebago	(42.1577°N 89.0455°W) Site was used as a drum storage and disposal area for wastes generated by Acme's solvent distillation units. From 1960 to 1970, the site consisted of seven waste disposal lagoons and open storage of 10,000 to 15,000 drums. Testing of groundwater found it to contain volatile organic compounds (VOCs). Soil sampling identified VOCs, phthalates, polychlorinated biphenyls (PCBs), and metals including lead and chromium.	12/30/1982	09/08/1983	07/13/1998	N/A	N/A

== See also ==
- List of Superfund sites in the United States
- List of environmental issues
- List of waste types
- TOXMAP
