= Sheri Jesiel =

American politician

Member of the Illinois House of Representatives from the 61st district
- In office July 2, 2014 – January 9, 2019
- Preceded by: JoAnn D. Osmond
- Succeeded by: Joyce Mason

Personal details
- Born: April 15, 1958 (age 68) Winthrop Harbor, Illinois, U.S.
- Party: Republican
- Children: Three
- Education: Carthage College (B.B.A.)
- Profession: Certified Public Accountant

Sheri Jesiel (born April 15, 1958) was a Republican member of the Illinois House of Representatives. She represented the 61st district from her appointment in July 2014 to replace the outgoing State Representative JoAnn D. Osmond until her loss to Joyce Mason in the 2018 general election. The 61st district is based in Northern Lake County and includes Zion, Winthrop Harbor, Beach Park, Old Mill Creek, Gurnee and Antioch.

Representative Jesiel served on the Appropriations-Elementary & Secondary Education, Appropriations-Human Services, Business Growth & Incentives, Human Services, Mass Transit and Personnel & Pensions Committees.

In the 2014 election, she defeated Loren Karner with 58% of the vote to Karner's 42%. In the 2016 race, she topped challenger Nick Ciko 57% to 43%. She lost the 2018 general election to Joyce Mason.
