= Robyn Gabel =

American politician (born 1953)

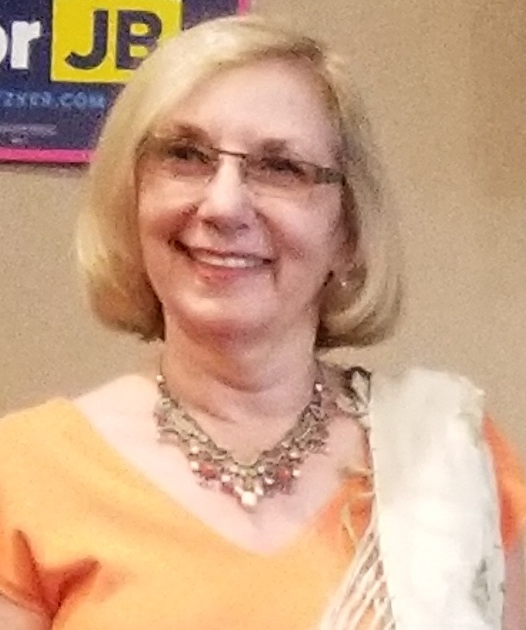

Majority Leader of the Illinois House of Representatives
- Incumbent
- Assumed office January 11, 2023
- Preceded by: Greg Harris

Member of the Illinois House of Representatives from the 18th district
- Incumbent
- Assumed office April 19, 2010
- Preceded by: Julie Hamos

Personal details
- Born: February 7, 1953 (age 73) Chicago, Illinois, U.S.
- Party: Democratic
- Children: 1
- Education: Beloit College (BA); University of Illinois, Chicago (MPH); Loyola University Chicago (MJur)

Robyn Gabel (born February 7, 1953) is the Majority Leader of the Illinois House of Representatives. A Democrat, she has represented the 18th District since April 19, 2010. The district includes the suburbs of Evanston, Wilmette, Kenilworth, Northbrook, Northfield, Winnetka and Glencoe.

== Early life and career ==
Gabel has a Bachelor of Arts from Beloit College, a Master of Science in Public Health from University of Illinois Chicago's School of Public Health, and a Master of Jurisprudence in Health Law from Loyola University of Chicago. From 1988 to 2010 she was the executive director of the Illinois Maternal and Child Health Coalition. On March 16, 2009, she was appointed to the Commission on the Elimination of Poverty. The Commission was established to address poverty in Illinois consistent with international human rights standards.

== Illinois House of Representatives ==
Gabel was appointed to the Illinois House of Representatives in April 2010 after Representative Julie Hamos was made Director of the Department of Healthcare and Family Services, and she won election to the seat that fall, and reelection every two years. In 2018, Gov. J. B. Pritzker appointed Gabel to Powering Illinois' Future transition committee, which is responsible for infrastructure and clean energy policies.

As of July 3, 2022, Representative Gabel is a member of the following Illinois House committees:

- Appropriations - Human Services Committee (HAPH)
- Energy & Environment Committee (HENG)
- Financial Impact Subcommittee (HMAC-IMPA)
- Human Services Committee (HHSV)
- Insurance Committee (HINS)
- (Chairwoman of) Medicaid Subcommittee (HHSV-MEDI)
- Museums, Arts, & Cultural Enhancements Committee (HMAC)
- State Government Administration Committee (HSGA)
- (Chairwoman of) Wages & Rates Subcommittee (HAPH-WAGE)

On January 13, 2023, House Speaker Chris Welch named Gable the House Majority Leader. She succeeds Greg Harris in the position.

== Electoral history ==
Illinois 18th Representative District Democratic Primary, 2010
Party	Candidate	Votes	%
Democratic	Robyn Gabel	4,488	27.74
Democratic	Patrick Keenan-Devlin	4,104	25.36
Democratic	Eamon Kelly	3,958	24.46
Democratic	Jeffrey Paul Smith	1,923	11.89
Democratic	Edmund B. Moran, Jr.	1,707	10.55
Total votes		16,180	100.0

Illinois 18th Representative District General Election, 2010
Party	Candidate	Votes	%
Democratic	Robyn Gabel (incumbent)	28,154	99.60
Write-in		114	0.40
Total votes		28,268	100.0

Illinois 18th Representative District General Election, 2012
Party	Candidate	Votes	%	±%
Democratic	Robyn Gabel (incumbent)	32,545	62.78	−36.82%
Republican	Eric Joseph Lieberman	19,292	37.22	N/A
Total votes		51,837	100.0	

Illinois 18th Representative District General Election, 2014
Party	Candidate	Votes	%	±%
Democratic	Robyn Gabel (incumbent)	28,256	100.0	+37.22%
Total votes		28,256	100.0	

Illinois 18th Representative District General Election, 2016
Party	Candidate	Votes	%	±%
Democratic	Robyn Gabel (incumbent)	36,794	64.13	−35.87%
Republican	Jessica Tucker	20,580	35.87	N/A
Total votes		57,374	100.0	

Illinois 18th Representative District General Election, 2018
Party	Candidate	Votes	%	±%
Democratic	Robyn Gabel (incumbent)	37,966	72.09	+7.96%
Republican	Julie Cho	14,697	27.91	−7.96%
Total votes		52,663	100.0	

Illinois 18th Representative District General Election, 2020
Party	Candidate	Votes	%	±%
Democratic	Robyn Gabel (incumbent)	43,607	72.31	+0.22%
Independent	Sean Matlis	16,699	27.69	N/A
Total votes		60,306	100.0	

Illinois 18th Representative District General Election, 2022
Party	Candidate	Votes	%	±%
Democratic	Robyn Gabel (incumbent)	32,808	81.31	+9.00%
Republican	Charles Hutchinson	7542	18.69	N/A
Total votes		40,350	100.0	

Illinois House of Representatives
Preceded by Greg Harris	Majority Leader of the Illinois House of Representatives; 2023–present	Incumbent
