= Raja Krishnamoorthi =

American lawyer and politician (born 1973)

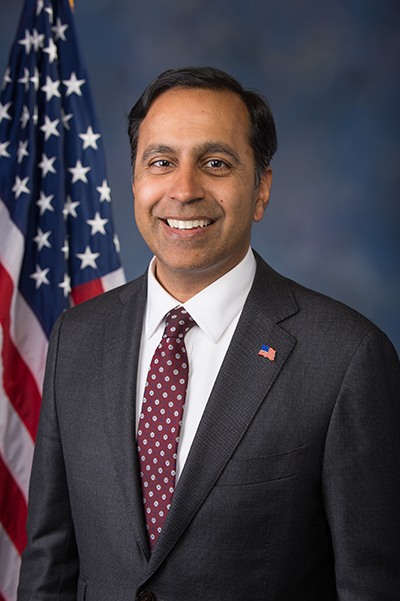
- Official portrait, 2016

Member of the U.S. House of Representatives from Illinois's 8th district
- Incumbent
- Assumed office January 3, 2017
- Preceded by: Tammy Duckworth

Personal details
- Born: Subramanian Raja Krishnamoorthi; July 19, 1973 (age 53) New Delhi, India
- Party: Democratic
- Spouse: Priya Krishnamoorthi
- Children: 3
- Education: Princeton University (BS); Harvard University (JD)
- Website: House website Campaign website
- Krishnamoorthi's voice Krishnamoorthi honoring Govindappa Venkataswamy, an Indian ophthalmologist. Recorded October 1, 2020.

Subramanian Raja Krishnamoorthi (/ˈrɑːdʒə ˌkrɪʃnəˈmʊərθi/ RAH-jə KRISH-nə-MOORTH-ee; born July 19, 1973) is an American attorney and politician serving as the U.S. representative for Illinois's 8th congressional district since 2017. He is a member of the Democratic Party.

Born in New Delhi, India, and raised in Peoria, Illinois, Krishnamoorthi served as a special assistant attorney general before he was first elected to the House in 2016. He is the first Indian American or person of South Asian descent to serve as a ranking member or chair of any full committee in the U.S. Congress. He also served as an assistant whip. He ran for the Democratic nomination in the 2026 United States Senate election in Illinois, but lost to Juliana Stratton.

== Early life and education ==
Krishnamoorthi was born in 1973 into a Tamil Hindu family in New Delhi, India. His family moved to Buffalo, New York, when he was three months old so that his father could attend graduate school. Early economic hardships necessitated the family living in public housing and using food assistance for a time. In 1980, the Krishnamoorthis moved to Peoria, Illinois, where his father became a professor at Bradley University, and the family enjoyed a middle-class upbringing. Krishnamoorthi attended public schools in Peoria, and was a valedictorian of his graduating class at Richwoods High School.

Krishnamoorthi attended Princeton University, where he earned a bachelor's degree in mechanical engineering summa cum laude. He then received a Juris Doctor with honors from Harvard Law School. During law school, Krishnamoorthi was managing editor of the Harvard Civil Rights–Civil Liberties Law Review, and published a law review article on the implementation of Local School Councils in Chicago public elementary schools.

== Early career ==
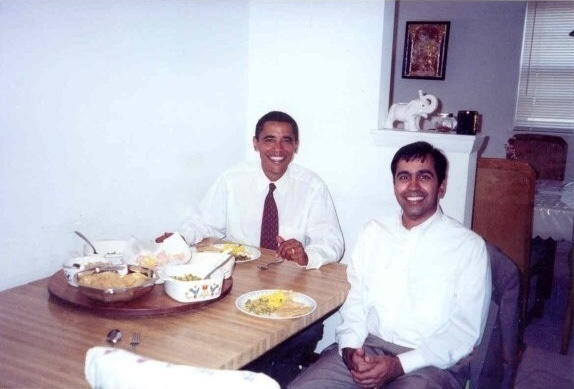
Krishnamoorthi and Barack Obama in July 2002

After graduating from Harvard, Krishnamoorthi served as a law clerk for federal judge Joan B. Gottschall in the Northern District of Illinois and then worked on Barack Obama's 2000 election campaign for the United States House of Representatives. He also served as an issues director for Obama's 2004 campaign for the United States Senate and aided in the development of Obama's 2004 Democratic National Convention keynote address.

After being appointed to the Board of the Illinois Housing Development Authority, Krishnamoorthi practiced law and then served as a special assistant attorney general, helping start the state's anti-corruption unit under Illinois Attorney General Lisa Madigan. He served as deputy state treasurer for Illinois Treasurer Alexi Giannoulias from 2007 to 2009 and then as vice-chairman of the Illinois Innovation Council. He was the president of high-tech small businesses in the Chicago area until he resigned before entering Congress to eliminate any conflicts of interest.

== U.S. House of Representatives ==
=== Elections ===
In 2010, Krishnamoorthi ran for the Democratic Party nomination for Illinois comptroller. He lost the primary election to state representative David E. Miller by less than 1% of the vote. In 2012 he ran for the Democratic nomination for the U.S. House of Representatives seat in Illinois's 8th congressional district, and lost to Tammy Duckworth with 33.8% of the vote.

In 2016, Duckworth ran for the U.S. Senate, leaving her Congressional seat open. Krishnamoorthi then declared his candidacy for the U.S. House of Representatives seat she was vacating, the same one he had run for four years prior. He won the March 2016 primary election with 57% of the vote, to state senator Michael Noland's 29% and Deb Bullwinkel's 13%. Krishnamoorthi defeated Republican DuPage County County board member Pete DiCianni in the November general election, capturing 58.1% of the vote after a campaign in which he vowed to fight for middle-class families in Congress.

Krishnamoorthi was unopposed for the 2018 Democratic nomination, and won the general election with more than 66% of the vote.

Krishnamoorthi received 80% of the vote in the 2020 Democratic primary, and defeated Libertarian candidate Preston Nelson in the general election, 73% to 26%.

Krishnamoorthi won the 2022 Democratic nomination with 71% of the vote. Krishnamoorthi was reelected to a fourth term, defeating the Republican nominee by a 14-point margin.

In 2024, Krishnamoorthi was unopposed in the Democratic primary, and garnered a 14-point victory in the general election, defeating his Republican opponent, businessman Mark Rice.

=== Tenure ===
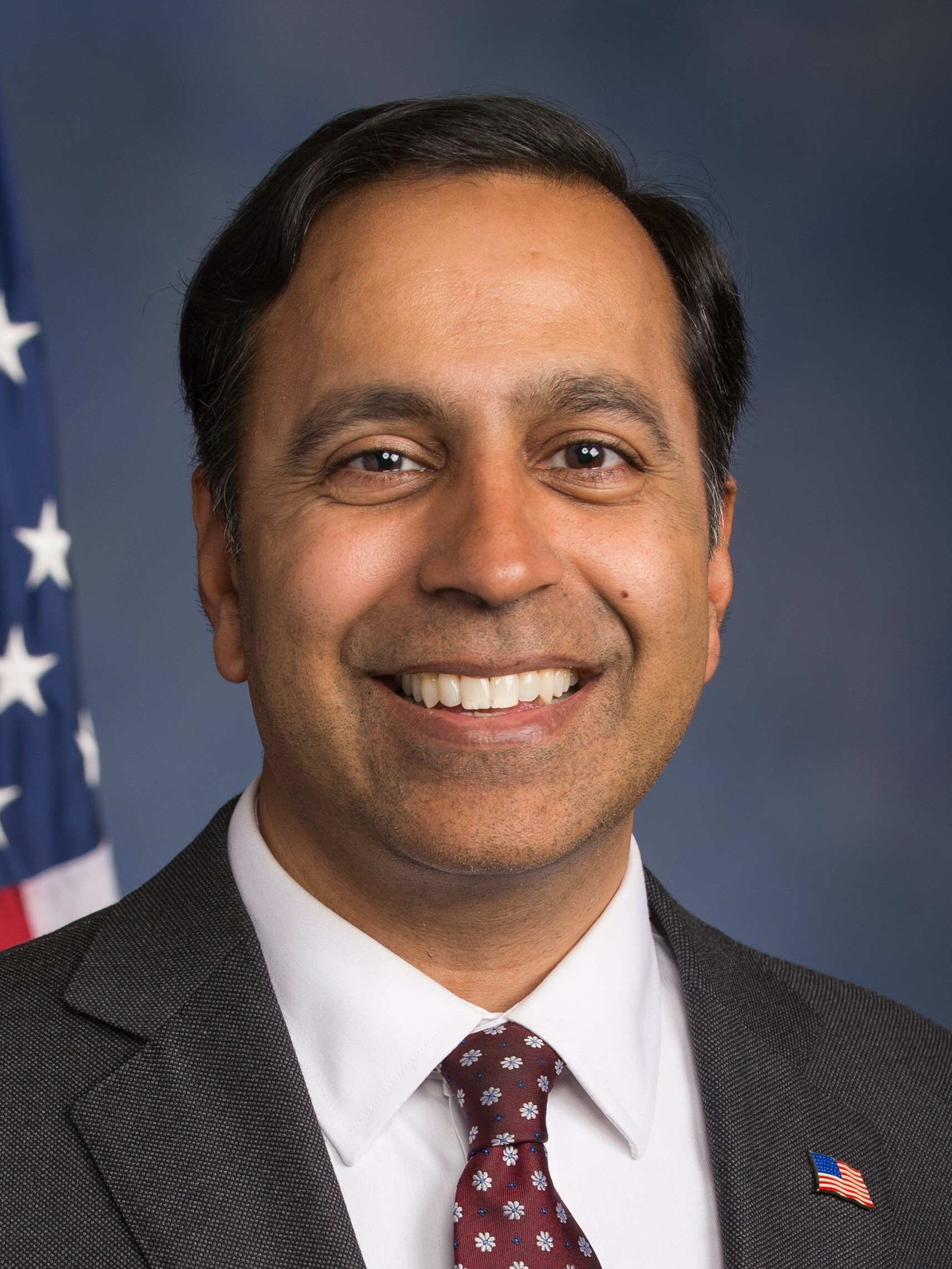
Official portrait, 115th Congress

Krishnamoorthi was sworn into office on January 3, 2017.

While Krishnamoorthi attended President Donald Trump's January 2017 inauguration, he said he did so in part "because I want President Trump to look at the crowd and Congress and see on day one that he will be strongly opposed if he continues to pursue policies that hurt working families." The day before the inauguration, he was included in a list featured in The Guardian of "up-and-coming leaders of the Trump resistance in Washington."

Krishnamoorthi voted with President Joe Biden's stated position 100% of the time in the 117th Congress, according to a FiveThirtyEight analysis.

==== Law enforcement funding ====
In June 2022, Krishnamoorthi joined local officials to present the Schaumburg Police Department with a check for $340,000 in recognition of federal funding he secured for a mobile response unit for mental health and substance misuse. This unit, implemented by the Schaumburg Police Department, Elk Grove Police Department, the Start Here Addiction Rehabilitation and Education Program, the Foglia Treatment Center, the Kenneth Young Center, and Live4Lali, allows the police to address 911 calls through crisis intervention overseen by social workers and community response professionals with experience related to mental health and substance disorders.

==== Education, job training and workforce development ====
In June 2017, the House unanimously passed the Thompson–Krishnamoorthi Strengthening Career and Technical Education for the 21st Century Act, which would overhaul the Carl D. Perkins Career and Technical Education Act and provide more flexibility to states. In November 2017, Krishnamoorthi and GT Thompson co-led a letter to the Senate education committee with 235 fellow members of the House urging them to take up the legislation. The Strengthening Career and Technical Education for the 21st Century Act passed the Senate and was signed into law by President Trump in July 2018.

==== TikTok ====
In December 2022, Krishnamoorthi and two other lawmakers introduced the Averting the National Threat of Internet Surveillance, Oppressive Censorship and Influence, and Algorithmic Learning by the Chinese Communist Party Act (ANTI-SOCIAL CCP Act), which would prohibit Chinese- and Russian-owned social networks from doing business in the United States. He later said that the TikTok algorithm was manipulated by the Chinese government. He also expressed concern about the alleged surveillance of journalists, possible manipulation of the algorithm in the aftermath of the October 7 attacks, and the fact that Osama bin Laden's 'Letter to America' had gone viral. He said that he wanted the platform sold, not banned.

==== Trump administration security clearance issues ====
In October 2017, Krishnamoorthi questioned the director of the National Background Investigations Bureau about the number of mistakes made in senior presidential advisor Jared Kushner's security clearance during a hearing by the House Committee on Oversight and Government Reform. In response to repeated questioning about whether he could recall "if there has ever been an applicant having to submit four addenda detailing over 100 errors and omissions being able to maintain their security clearance once those errors have been identified," Director Phalen said that he had never seen that level of mistakes.

==== Immigration and Trump administration's travel ban ====
On January 28, 2017, Trump's executive order placing restrictions on people entering the U.S. from seven Muslim-majority countries caused 18 travelers arriving at O'Hare International Airport to be detained and questioned by federal officers, including a family of legal permanent residents and their 18-month-old baby, who held U.S. citizenship. Krishnamoorthi arrived at O'Hare within hours to speak to immigration officials but was told they were unavailable. While joining a protest at the airport Krishnamoorthi said of the detentions, "They applied legally, they've been vetted and they've been here, in many cases, for decades, and they were detained by their own country at the airport. So many of our businesses rely on green card holders. How are we supposed to attract these people if they think they'll be detained at the airport if they go abroad for a wedding, or just to show their baby to relatives?"

In a WGN radio interview the next morning, Krishnamoorthi denounced Trump's immigration initiative, calling it the "worst executive order you could draw up to unify the country."

==== First impeachment of Donald Trump ====
As a member of both the House Oversight Committee and the House Permanent Select Committee on Intelligence, Krishnamoorthi was closely involved in Trump's impeachment as a member of the Intelligence Committee.

==== Vaping and e-cigarettes ====
Time magazine called Krishnamoorthi the vaping industry's "biggest enemy in D.C." In July 2019, as chairman of the House Oversight Subcommittee on Economic and Consumer Policy, he held hearings investigating the industry's marketing practices, especially those allegedly aimed at children. In the wake of this investigation, the FDA issued a warning letter to e-cigarette manufacturer Juul Labs, which then halted all domestic marketing and advertising.

==== COVID-19 pandemic ====
As chair of the House Oversight Subcommittee on Consumer and Economic Policy, Krishnamoorthi led investigations into the federal response to the pandemic, including the federal ventilator shortage and the Trump administration's misuse of CDC funds for partisan political messaging, funds that were originally intended for a public awareness campaign. After public outcry, the Department of Health and Human Services canceled the campaign using celebrities who had been vetted, in part, based on their political leanings.

==== Animal welfare ====
Krishnamoorthi has a legislative history of supporting animal welfare measures. In 2021, he reintroduced the bipartisan Animal Welfare Enforcement Improvement Act, which strengthens licensing enforcement for animal dealers. In 2025, Humane Action Fund, the political arm of Humane World for Animals, gave Krishnamoorthi a rating of "100+" indicating that he had taken stances consistent with the Humane Action Fund on all the organization's priority legislation. Additionally, the fund designated him a "leader" indicating further actions to support animals.

==== Artificial intelligence and national security ====
Krishnamoorthi has advanced legislation on artificial intelligence, particularly its implications for national security and defense. He supported a Biden administration rule that limited the export of U.S.–made AI accelerators to most countries. This rule was opposed by technology companies, including the U.S. semiconductor giant Nvidia. Supporters of the rule, including Krishnamoorthi, were described as "China hawks." Krishnamoorthi advocates for closing loopholes that allow the diffusion of U.S. semiconductor technology to China.

==== LGBTQ+ resources ====
On September 17, 2025, Krishnamoorthi introduced the 988 LGBTQ+ Youth Access Act of 2025, a bipartisan bill that would require the U.S. Department of Health and Human Services to maintain specialized 988 Suicide and Crisis Lifeline services for LGBTQ+ youth and reserve at least 9 percent of annual 988 Lifeline funding for those services. The House bill was co-sponsored by representatives Michael Lawler, Sharice Davids, Brian Fitzpatrick, and Seth Moulton, with companion legislation introduced in the Senate by Senators Tammy Baldwin and Lisa Murkowski. It was supported by the Trevor Project, the American Foundation for Suicide Prevention, the National Alliance on Mental Illness, GLSEN, and the Human Rights Campaign.

==== Armenia–Azerbaijan conflict ====
In October 2020, Krishnamoorthi co-signed a letter to Secretary of State Mike Pompeo condemning Azerbaijan's offensive operations against the Armenian-populated enclave of Nagorno-Karabakh.

==== Other congressional investigations and oversight activities ====
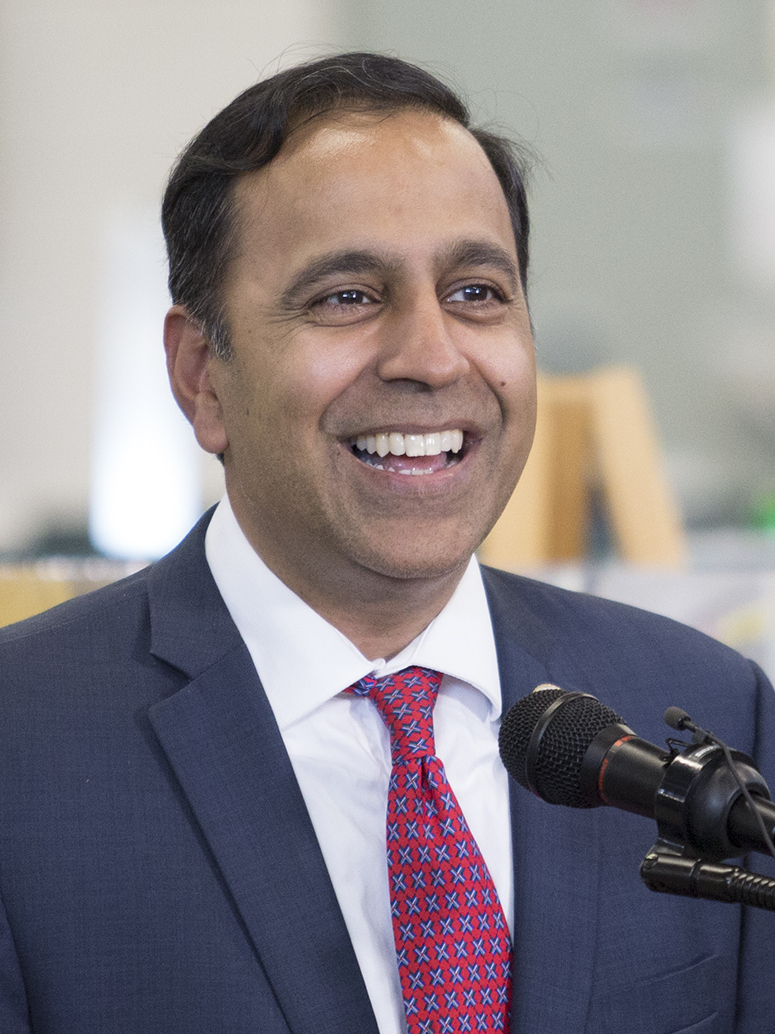
Krishnamoorthi in 2018

In November 2020, Krishnamoorthi led investigations into the National Highway Traffic Safety Administration (NHTSA)'s failure to establish side-impact test standards for children's car seats and boosters, effectively allowing manufacturers to create their own standards. Some manufacturers were found to be selling booster seats that had been shown to be unsafe in the companies' own safety tests.

In November 2020, Krishnamoorthi called for the investigation of Senator David Perdue's stock trades involving a defense contractor while he was on the Senate Armed Services Committee.

During an Oversight Committee hearing into the Sackler family and Purdue Pharma's role in the opioid epidemic, Krishnamoorthi sharply criticized members of the Sackler family as well as Purdue Pharma executives, calling on Purdue Pharma president Craig Landau to take responsibility for the company's involvement in the opioid crisis and forgo the $3.5 million bonus he was then seeking from Purdue Pharma, while the company was struggling to pay out damages to victims of the opioid OxyContin.

In 2021, Krishnamoorthi began an investigation into the Washington Commanders and their owner, Dan Snyder, for workplace misconduct related to widespread sexual harassment, citing a lack of transparency in the NFL's own investigation into the matter. In April 2022, the Subcommittee on Economic and Consumer Policy found evidence indicating the team "routinely withheld security deposits that should have been returned to customers", "improperly convert[ed] certain unclaimed security deposits into revenue", and "repeatedly concealed ticket sales revenue" from the NFL. The Commanders denied any financial misconduct. In May 2022, Krishnamoorthi canceled a fundraiser "out of an abundance of caution" after being informed lobbyists had sent unauthorized correspondence and outreach for the event, referencing the ongoing investigation. Lobbyist Mike Manatos admitted the correspondence was sent without the knowledge of or coordination with Krishnamoorthi or his staff. In July 2022, Snyder testified before the House Committee in a private deposition.

=== Committee assignments ===
For the 119th Congress:

- Committee on Oversight and Government Reform
  - Subcommittee on Health Care and Financial Services (Ranking Member)
- Permanent Select Committee on Intelligence
  - Subcommittee on Central Intelligence Agency
  - Subcommittee on Open Source Intelligence
- Select Committee on Strategic Competition between the United States and the Chinese Communist Party (Ranking Member)

=== Caucus memberships ===
- New Democrat Coalition
- Congressional Asian Pacific American Caucus (Co-chair of the CAPAC Immigration Task Force)
- Congressional Solar Caucus (co-founder)
- Congressional Caucus to End the Youth Vaping Epidemic (co-founder)
- Middle Class Jobs Caucus (co-founder)
- LGBT Equality Caucus (Vice-chair)
- COVID-19 Global Vaccination Caucus (Co-founder & Co-chair)
- Manufacturing Caucus
- Congressional Cooperative Business Caucus
- Municipal Bond Caucus
- Tech Accountability Caucus
- Congressional Travel and Tourism Caucus
- Congressional Fire Services Caucus
- Congressional Career and Technical Education Caucus
- Congressional Arts Caucus
- Community College Caucus
- Congressional Citizen Legislature Caucus
- General Aviation Caucus
- Quiet Skies Caucus
- Candy Caucus
- Small Brewers Caucus
- Dietary Supplement Caucus
- Pro-Choice
- Black Maternal Health Caucus
- Task Force to Combat Heroin Epidemic
- Diabetes Caucus
- Rare Disease Caucus
- Childhood Cancer Caucus
- Lyme Disease Caucus
- Autism Caucus
- Congressional Animal Protection Caucus
- Sri Lanka Caucus
- Congressional Blockchain Caucus
- Congressional Ukraine Caucus

== 2026 U.S. Senate campaign ==
On May 7, 2025, Krishnamoorthi announced that he would run for the United States Senate seat being vacated by Dick Durbin in the 2026 election. Illinois Governor JB Pritzker and his allies allegedly discouraged Krishnamoorthi to run, though he denied the claims.

Though Krishnamoorthi led in early polls and raised over $30 million, he ultimately lost to Illinois Lieutenant Governor Juliana Stratton in the Democratic primary.

== Electoral history ==
Illinois State Comptroller Democratic Primary, 2010
Party	Candidate	Votes	%
Democratic	David E. Miller	393,405	46.71
Democratic	S. Raja Krishnamoorthi	384,796	45.68
Democratic	Clinton A. "Clint" Krislov	64,086	7.61
Total votes		842,287	100.0

Illinois 8th Congressional District Democratic Primary, 2012
Party	Candidate	Votes	%
Democratic	Tammy Duckworth	17,097	66.18
Democratic	Raja Krishnamoorthi	8,736	33.82
Total votes		25,833	100.0

Illinois 8th Congressional District Democratic Primary, 2016
Party	Candidate	Votes	%
Democratic	Raja Krishnamoorthi	44,950	56.99
Democratic	Michael Noland	22,925	29.06
Democratic	Deborah M. Bullwinkel	11,005	13.95
Total votes		78,880	100.0

Illinois 8th Congressional District General Election, 2016
Party	Candidate	Votes	%
Democratic	Raja Krishnamoorthi	144,954	58.31
Republican	Peter "Pete" DiCianni	103,617	41.68
Write-in votes	Andrew Straw	5	0.00
Total votes		248,576	100.0

Illinois 8th Congressional District General Election, 2018
Party	Candidate	Votes	%
Democratic	Raja Krishnamoorthi (incumbent)	130,054	65.97
Republican	Jitendra "JD" Diganvker	67,073	34.03
Total votes		197,127	100.0

Illinois 8th Congressional District Democratic Primary, 2020
Party	Candidate	Votes	%
Democratic	Raja Krishnamoorthi (incumbent)	51,829	79.94
Democratic	William Olson	8,441	13.02
Democratic	Inam Hussain	4,563	7.04
Total votes		64,833	100.0

Illinois 8th Congressional District General Election, 2020
Party	Candidate	Votes	%
Democratic	Raja Krishnamoorthi (incumbent)	186,251	73.16
Libertarian	Preston Gabriel Nelson	68,327	26.84
Total votes		254,578	100.0

Illinois 8th Congressional District Democratic Primary, 2022
Party	Candidate	Votes	%
Democratic	Raja Krishnamoorthi (incumbent)	29,933	70.3
Democratic	Junaid Ahmed	12,627	29.7
Total votes		42,560	100.0

Illinois 8th Congressional District General Election, 2022
Party	Candidate	Votes	%
Democratic	Raja Krishnamoorthi (incumbent)	117,880	56.9
Republican	Chris Dargis	89,335	43.1
Total votes		207,215	100.0

Illinois 8th Congressional District General Election, 2024
Party	Candidate	Votes	%
Democratic	Raja Krishnamoorthi (incumbent)	172,920	57.1
Republican	Mark Rice	130,153	42.9
Total votes		303,073	100.0

United States Senate election in Illinois Democratic Primary, 2026
Party	Candidate	Votes	%
Democratic	Juliana Stratton	507,689	40.4
Democratic	Raja Krishnamoorthi	411,150	32.7
Democratic	Robin Kelly	229,788	18.3
Democratic	Kevin Ryan	61,914	4.9
Democratic	Bryan Maxwell	10,070	0.8
Democratic	Sean Brown	8,122	0.6
Democratic	Awisi Bustos	8,020	0.6
Democratic	Christopher Swann	7,896	0.6
Democratic	Jonathan Dean	6,762	0.5
Democratic	Steve Botsford	5,411	0.4
Total votes		1,256,822	100.0

== Personal life ==
Krishnamoorthi is a practicing Hindu and is married to Priya, who is a doctor. They live in Schaumburg, Illinois, with their three children.

In January 2017, Krishnamoorthi, a lifelong Chicago Cubs fan, and his elder son attended the Cubs' official White House commemoration of their World Series victory.

== Publications ==
=== Articles ===
- As China backslides on women’s rights, the U.S. can step up, The Washington Post, July 1, 2024 (co-authored with Kathy Castor)
- The Chinese Communist Party wants to decide our elections for us. We can't allow it. The Hill, May 23, 2024
- Xi Jinping Has Tough Economic Choices Ahead, Foreign Policy, April 26, 2024
- Congress should block US investment in China's military and human rights abuses, The Hill, February 8, 2024
- Does Competing with the Chinese Communist Party Mean 'Kicking It When It's Down?' The Diplomat, December 29, 2023

U.S. House of Representatives
Preceded by Tammy Duckworth	Member of the U.S. House of Representatives from Illinois's 8th congressional district 2017–present	Incumbent
U.S. order of precedence (ceremonial)
Preceded by Ro Khanna	United States representatives by seniority 171st	Succeeded by David Kustoff
