= Joyce Mason =

American politician

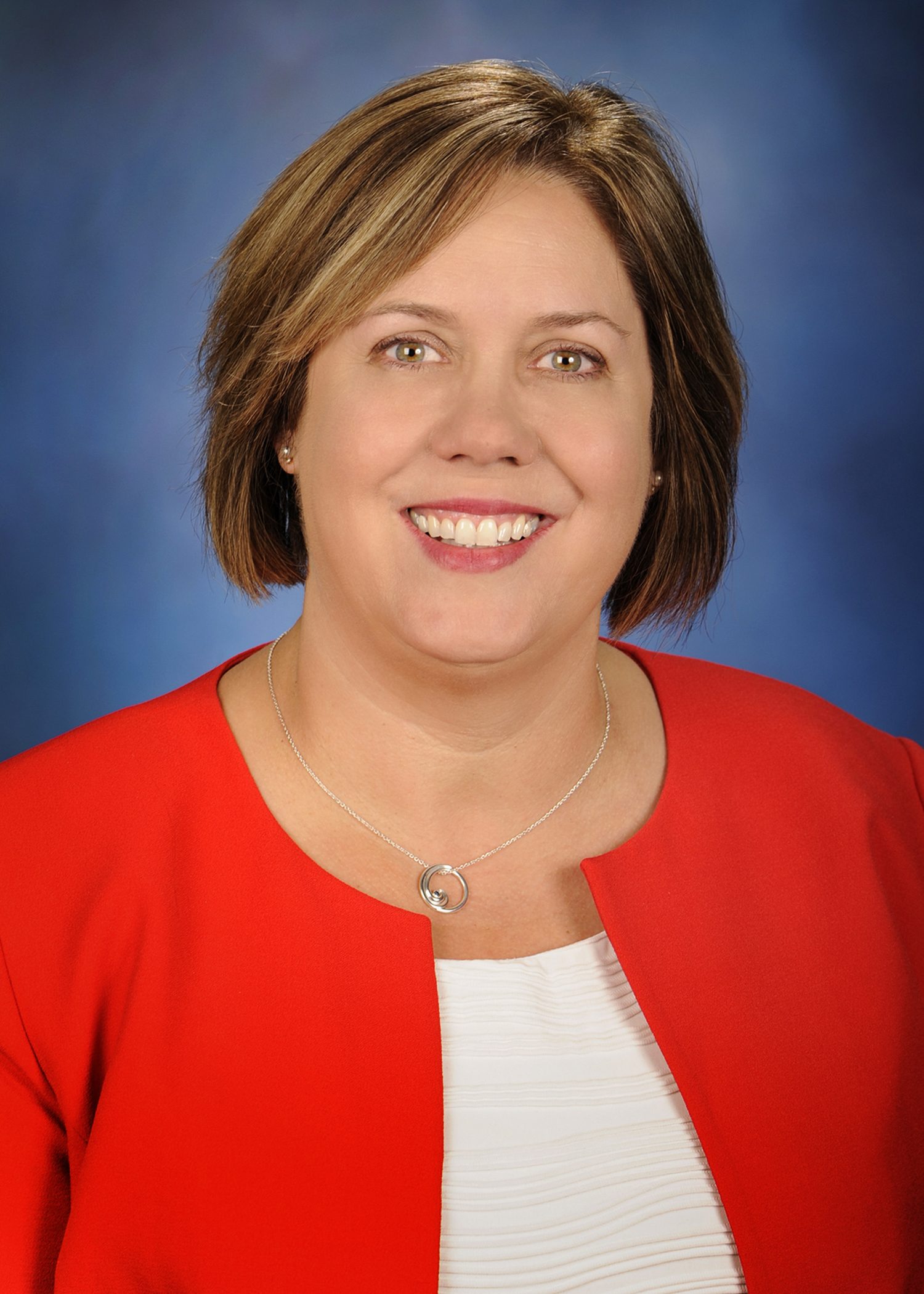

Member of the Illinois House of Representatives from the 61st district
- Incumbent
- Assumed office January 9, 2019
- Preceded by: Sheri Jesiel

Personal details
- Party: Democratic
- Education: DeVry University (MBA); University of Illinois (BA)
- Profession: Human Resources Consultant

Joyce Mason is a Democratic member of the Illinois House of Representatives for the 61st district. The 61st district, located in northern Lake County, includes all or parts of Zion, Winthrop Harbor, Beach Park, Old Mill Creek, Gurnee and Antioch.

Mason defeated Republican incumbent Sheri Jesiel in the 2018 general election.

Mason, a resident of Gurnee, was Vice President of the Woodland Community Consolidated School District 50 Board of Education at the time of her election to the Illinois House of Representatives. She is a human resources consultant with a master of business administration from the Keller Graduate School of Management and a bachelor of arts in communications from University of Illinois at Chicago.

As of July 3, 2022, Representative Mason is a member of the following Illinois House committees:

- Agriculture & Conservation Committee (HAGC)
- Appropriations - Higher Education Committee (HAPI)
- Elementary & Secondary Education: School Curriculum & Policies Committee (HELM)
- Energy & Environment Committee (HENG)
- Prescription Drug Affordability Committee (HPDA)
- Tourism Committee (SHTO)

== Electoral history ==
Illinois 61st Representative District General Election, 2022
Party	Candidate	Votes	%	±%
Democratic	Joyce Mason (incumbent)	18,383	56.33	+1.24%
Republican	Peter Pettorini	14,250	43.67	−1.24%
Total votes		32,633	100.0	

Illinois 61st Representative District General Election, 2020
Party	Candidate	Votes	%	±%
Democratic	Joyce Mason (incumbent)	28,447	55.09	+3.51%
Republican	Dan Yost	23,189	44.91	−3.51%
Total votes		51,636	100.0	

Illinois 61st Representative District General Election, 2018
Party	Candidate	Votes	%
Democratic	Joyce Mason	20,015	51.58
Republican	Sheri Jesiel (incumbent)	18,789	48.42
Total votes		38,804	100.0
