= John W. Carroll =

American politician and newspaper publisher (1901–1993)

Member of the Illinois House of Representatives
- In office 1975–1977

Member of the Illinois Senate
- In office 1967–1973

Member of the Illinois House of Representatives
- In office 1957–1967

Personal details
- Born: John William Carroll; 1901 Omemee, Ontario, Canada
- Died: September 8, 1993 (aged 92) Wheeling, Illinois, U.s.
- Party: Republican

John William Carroll (1901 – September 8, 1993) was an American politician and publisher of suburban newspapers in the Chicago metropolitan area who served as a member and Majority Leader of the House of Representatives along with the Senate of Illinois for eighteen years between 1957 and 1977.

== Life ==
Carroll was born in 1901 on a farm in Omemee, Ontario, Canada and had Irish ancestry. At the age of sixteen, he emigrated to the US, leaving Canada by foot, and joined the United States Army, which stationed him in the Philippines. While there he worked night shifts as a copy boy for the Manila Bulletin. On returning to the US after the end of World War I, he began working for the San Francisco Evening Bulletin, becoming their assistant business manager. He resigned from that paper to become a travelling auditor with Edward Walker & Co., eventually moving to Chicago to handle the accounts of several newspapers in the US Midwest. He then became the publisher of the Evening Journal in Berlin, Wisconsin and then sales manager of the Evanston News Index (in Illinois), before buying the first of a chain of local newspapers, the Park Ridge Advocate in 1938. He settled in Park Ridge and named his newspaper chain Pickwick Newspapers after the Pickwick Building in which it was originally situated, which also houses the Pickwick Theatre, whose name refers to the character Samuel Pickwick from the Charles Dicken's novel The Pickwick Papers.

He was the president of the Illinois Press Association from 1952 to 1953. He began his state political career in the 1950s by working as an assistant to governor William Stratton. He was then elected as a Republican to the Illinois House of Representatives at the 1956 elections, eventually became Majority Leader, and switched to the state Senate at the elections in 1966, retiring from politics in 1973. He returned to politics in 1975 to take up a position in the House of Representatives vacated by the death of Robert S. Juckett SR, leaving at the end of Juckett's term in office.< He was active in capping expendature on welfare and public aid programs. In 1979, he sold his newspaper chain to Pioneer Press.

He was married to Carol, a journalist, and the couple had two children, Patty, a photographer, and Mike, a newspaper publisher who took over his father's papers. In daily life Carroll went by his middle name William, shortened to Bill.

He died on September 8, 1993, aged 92, at the Addolorata Nursing Home in Wheeling.
