= Andrea S. Moore =

American politician

Andrea S. Moore (born September 2, 1944) was an American politician.

Born in Libertyville, Illinois, Moore went to Drake University. She served on the Lake County, Illinois Board and as a village trustee for Libertyville, Illinois. Moore served in the Illinois House of Representatives and was a Republican. In 2002, Moore was appointed assistant director of the Illinois Department of Natural Resources. Moore resigned effective December 31, 2001. Local Republican leaders appointed Suzanne D. Simpson, the Township Supervisor of Warren Township as her successor. Moore served as a member of the Illinois Pollution Control Board from December 1, 2003, to October 22, 2011.
