= Toxicity characteristic leaching procedure =

Soil sample extraction method

Toxicity characteristic leaching procedure (TCLP) is a method for chemical analysis designed to determine the mobility of both organic and inorganic analytes present in liquid, solid, and multiphasic wastes. According to the U.S. EPA, "This method is an SW-846 Method-Defined Parameter (MDP), meaning that it may not be modified when used for Resource Conservation and Recovery Act (RCRA) testing."

List of "D" wastes published by US EPA

== Background ==
In the United States, the Resource Conservation and Recovery Act (RCRA) of 1976 led to establishment of federal standards for the disposal of solid waste and hazardous waste. RCRA requires that potential waste must be characterized following testing protocols published by EPA.

== Application of test ==
The Environmental Compliance Supervisor at a typical municipal landfill (as defined by RCRA Subtitle D) uses TCLP data to determine whether a waste may be accepted into the facility. If TCLP analytical results are below the TCLP D-list maximum contamination levels (MCLs) the waste can be accepted. If they are above these levels the waste must be taken to a hazardous waste disposal facility and the cost of disposal may increase.

Spent abrasive or soil from a construction site often needs to have a TCLP test performed to detect the presence of lead and other contaminants.

== Procedure ==
TCLP comprises four fundamental procedures:

- Sample preparation for leaching
- Sample leaching
- Preparation of leachate for analysis
- Leachate analysis

In the TCLP procedure the pH of the sample material is first established, and then leached with an acetic acid / sodium hydroxide solution at a 1:20 mix of sample to solvent. For example, a TCLP jug may contain 100g of sample and 2000 mL of solution. The leachate mixture is sealed in extraction vessel for general analytes, or possibly pressure sealed as in zero-headspace extractions (ZHE) for volatile organic compounds and tumbled for 18 hours to simulate an extended leaching time in the ground. It is then filtered so that only the solution (not the sample) remains and this is then analyzed.

== See also ==
- Landfill gas monitoring
