= Majority Leader of the Illinois House of Representatives =

The office of Majority Leader of the Illinois House of Representatives, usually in practice called the Illinois House Majority Leader, is a statutory office of the Illinois House of Representatives.

== Duties of office ==
The Illinois House Majority Leader is selected by the Speaker of the Illinois House of Representatives and is a member of the majority party of that legislative chamber. In practice, the House Majority Leader serves as the Speaker's chief floor aide and legislative whip. The House Majority Leader may preside over meetings of the Speaker's political party caucus or leadership team, and may serve as a negotiator for members of his or her political party in talks with other Illinois political leaders.

The Illinois House Majority Leader receives a stipend in addition to his or her pay as a member of the Illinois legislature.

== List ==
Name	Term	Party
William G. Clark	1959 to 1960	Democrat
John W. Carroll	?	Republican
Clyde L. Choate	1965 to 1966	Democrat
William E. Pollack	1967 to 1968	Republican
Lewis V. Morgan	1969 to 1970	Republican
Henry Hyde	1971 to 1972	Republican
William D. Walsh	1973 to 1974	Republican
Gerald W. Shea	1975 to 1976	Democrat
Michael Madigan	1977 to 1980	Democrat
Arthur A. Telcser	1981 to 1982	Republican
Jim McPike	1983 to 1994	Democrat
Robert W. Churchill	1995 to 1996	Republican
Barbara Flynn Currie	1997 to 2019	Democrat
Greg Harris	2019 to 2023	Democrat
Robyn Gabel	2023 to present	Democrat

== Recent ==
The current Illinois House Majority Leader, Representative Robyn Gabel, began her term in the position in 2023. She succeeded Greg Harris who did not seek re-election.

== See also ==
- Illinois General Assembly
- Illinois House of Representatives
- Illinois Senate
- Politics of Illinois
