= Ruth Munson =

American politician

Member of the Illinois House of Representatives from the 43rd district
- In office December 30, 2002 - 2009
- Preceded by: Douglas Hoeft
- Succeeded by: Keith Farnham

Personal details
- Born: Waukegan, Illinois
- Party: Republican
- Spouse: Steve
- Children: Two
- Education: Northern Illinois University
- Profession: Business owner

Ruth Munson is a former Republican member of the Illinois House of Representatives.

She is the founder and owner of EveryWare Inc., a software development firm in Elgin, and served on the Elgin city council. Her House committee assignments at the beginning of her tenure were the Appropriations—Human Services, Computer Technology, Health Care Availability & Access, Housing & Urban Development, and Tourism Committees.

Upon the death of Republican incumbent Douglas Hoeft, Munson was appointed by local Republican leaders to serve as a member of the Illinois House from the 43rd district. She was sworn in on December 30, 2002. The 43rd district, at the time, included parts of Elgin, Barrington Hills, Carpentersville, and East Dundee.

In the 2008 general election, Munson lost to Keith Farnham by a margin of 322 votes.
