= Timothy H. Osmond =

American politician and businessman (1949–2002)

Timothy H. Osmond (January 12, 1949 – December 17, 2002) was an American politician and businessman.

Born in Sycamore, Illinois, Osmond received his bachelor's degree from Western Illinois University and was in the insurance business in Antioch, Illinois. Osmond served in the Antioch Township government and was a Republican. Osmond served in the Illinois House of Representatives from 1999 until his death, in Antioch, Illinois, from a heart attack. His wife JoAnn also served in the Illinois House of Representatives.
