= Illinois Pollution Control Board =

Illinois governing panel

The Illinois Pollution Control Board (PCB) is a State of Illinois governing panel that is staffed in the state capital of Springfield, Illinois. Its duty is to development environmental rules and standards for Illinois, adjudicate complaints alleging violations of the Illinois Environmental Protection Act, and provides a forum of administrative law to appeal enforcement actions of Illinois environmental law, including enforcement actions of the Illinois Environmental Protection Agency (IEPA). Although the IEPA and the PCB are closely affiliated, they are legally separate entities.
