= 2022 Illinois Senate election =

2022 Illinois Senate elections
- November 8, 2022

All 59 seats in the Illinois Senate 30 seats needed for a majority
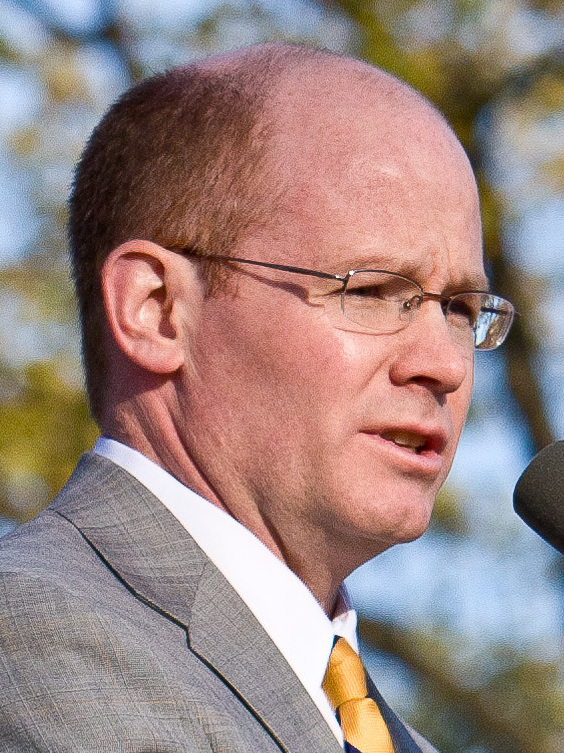

	Majority party	Minority party
Leader	Don Harmon	Dan McConchie
Party	Democratic	Republican
Leader's seat	6th-Chicago	26th-Hawthorn Woods
Last election	41 seats, 69.5%	18 seats, 30.5%
Seats won	40	19
Seat change	▼1	▲1
Popular vote	1,859,360	1,729,938
Percentage	51.79%	48.19%
Swing	▼14.56%	▲15.18%
- Democratic gain Republican gain Democratic hold Republican hold 50–60% 60–70% 70–80% 80–90% >90% 50–60% 60–70% 70–80% 80–90% >90% 50–60% 60–70% 70–80% 80–90% >90% 50–60% 60–70% 70–80% 80–90% >90%
Senate President before election
Don Harmon
Democratic
Elected Senate President
Don Harmon
Democratic

The 2022 elections for the Illinois Senate occurred on November 8, 2022, to elect senators from all of the state's 59 legislative districts in the Illinois Senate. The primary election took place on Tuesday, June 28, 2022. The winners of this election would serve in the 103rd General Assembly, with seats apportioned among the state based on the 2020 United States census. Under the Illinois Constitution of 1970, senators are divided into three groups, with each group having a two-year term at a different part of the decade between censuses, with the rest of the decade being taken up by two four-year terms. The Democratic Party had held a majority in the Senate since 2003. The inauguration of the 103rd General Assembly occurred on Wednesday, January 11, 2023.

The elections for Illinois United States Senator (Class III), Illinois's 17 congressional districts, Illinois Governor and Lieutenant Governor, Illinois Executive positions, and the Illinois House were also held on this date.

The Republican Party flipped two districts, with the Democratic Party flipping one district, resulting in a net gain of one seat for the Republicans. Despite the seat loss, the Democrats still maintained their supermajority in the Illinois Senate.

== Retirements ==
=== Democrats ===
1. District 1: Antonio Munoz retired.
2. District 12: Steven Landek retired.
3. District 16: Jacqueline Y. Collins retired to run for U. S. representative from Illinois's 1st congressional district.
4. District 23: Diane Pappas retired.
5. District 31: Melinda Bush retired.
6. District 43: John Connor resigned.

=== Republicans ===
1. District 45: Brian W. Stewart retired.
2. District 55: Darren Bailey retired to run for governor of Illinois.

== Predictions ==
Source	Ranking	As of
Sabato's Crystal Ball	Likely D	May 19, 2022

== Overview ==
2022 Illinois State Senate general election
Party	Votes	Percentage	% change	Candidates	Seats before	Seats after	+/–
Democratic	1,859,360	51.79%	▼14.56%	41	41	40	▼1
Republican	1,729,938	48.19%	▲15.18%	35	18	19	▲1
Write-ins	549	0.02%	▲0.01%	5	N/A	N/A	N/A
Totals	3,594,888	100.00%	—	81	59	59	—

Popular vote
Democratic	51.79%
Republican	48.19%
Other	0.02%

Senate seats
Democratic	67.80%
Republican	32.20%

== Close races ==
District	Winner	Margin
District 19	Democratic	1.18%
District 23	Democratic	9.22%
District 24	Republican (gain)	3.86%
District 26	Republican	0.44%
District 36	Democratic (gain)	9.26%
District 48	Democratic	1.84%
District 56	Republican (gain)	2.2%

== Election info ==
=== Illinois Senate Minority Leader ===
Bill Brady was the Republican Minority Leader of the Illinois Senate from July 1, 2017, to December 31, 2020. On November 4, 2020, Brady announced he would step down as Senate party leader and would "[hint] at another run for statewide office." Dan McConchie was elected on November 5, 2020, as then-leader-elect of the Republican caucus. Brady would go on to resign from the Senate on December 31, 2020. Alongside the inauguration of the 102nd General Assembly, McConchie was formally confirmed as Republican Minority Leader on January 13, 2021.

=== Redistricting ===
With the 2020 United States census, all 59 legislative districts and the corresponding 118 representative districts were required to be redrawn to accommodate the new population data. As a result of the COVID-19 pandemic, the United States Census Bureau stated that the necessary data for redistricting would not be available until September 2021. The Illinois Constitution states that:

"In the year following each Federal decennial census year, the General Assembly by law shall redistrict the Legislative Districts and the Representative Districts. If no redistricting plan becomes effective by June 30 of that year, a Legislative Redistricting Commission shall be constituted not later than July 10. The Commission shall consist of eight members, no more than four of whom shall be members of the same political party." — Illinois Constitution Article IV Section 3b

With the possibility of this commission and the state constitution not specifying what population data to use in redistricting, Illinois Democrats went ahead and started the redistricting process. In redistricting, the committees used data from the American Community Survey. Democrats faced criticism from Republicans over the use of the ACS data in redistricting and shutting out Republicans in the redistricting process. Governor J. B. Pritzker faced criticism for his previous support in 2018 for an independent commission and pledge to veto any maps "in any way drafted or created by legislators, political party leaders and/or their staffs or allies."

== Districts 1–29 ==
=== District 1 ===
The district had been represented by Democratic Assistant Majority Leader Antonio Munoz since January 9, 1999. Munoz was re-elected unopposed in 2020. Initially filing to run, Munoz announced in May 2022 that he would not run for re-election. Javier Cervantes, a business manager for Service Employees International Union, was the Democratic nominee. Cervantes faced no other ballot-listed candidates in the general election.

2022 Illinois' 1st legislative district election results
Party	Candidate	Votes	%
Democratic	Javier Loera Cervantes	27,928	100.0
Total votes		27,928	100.0
Democratic hold			

=== District 2 ===
The district had been represented by Democrat Omar Aquino since his appointment on July 1, 2016. He was re-elected unopposed in 2018. Aquino faced Wilmer Maldonado and Wilson Vazquez, a Teamster, for the Democratic nomination. Aquino won renomination and faced no other ballot-listed candidates in the general election.

Democratic primary results
Party	Candidate	Votes	%
Democratic	Omar Aquino (incumbent)	12,580	75.57
Democratic	Wilmer A. Maldonado	2,101	12.62
Democratic	Wilson Vazquez	1,966	11.81
Total votes		16,647	100.0

2022 Illinois' 2nd legislative District election results
Party	Candidate	Votes	%
Democratic	Omar Aquino (incumbent)	39,186	100.0
Total votes		39,186	100.0
Democratic hold			

=== District 3 ===
The district had been represented by Democrat Mattie Hunter since January 8, 2003. Hunter was re-elected unopposed in 2018. She faced no other ballot-listed candidates in the general election.

2022 Illinois' 3rd legislative district election results
Party	Candidate	Votes	%
Democratic	Mattie Hunter (incumbent)	40,116	100.0
Total votes		40,116	100.0
Democratic hold			

=== District 4 ===
The district had been represented by Democratic Majority Leader Kimberly A. Lightford since November 20, 1998. Lightford was re-elected unopposed in 2020. She faced no other ballot-listed candidates in the general election.

2022 Illinois' 4th legislative district election results
Party	Candidate	Votes	%
Democratic	Kimberly A. Lightford (incumbent)	51,442	100.0
Total votes		51,442	100.0
Democratic hold			

=== District 5 ===
The district had been represented by Democrat Patricia Van Pelt since January 9, 2013. Van Pelt was re-elected unopposed in 2018. She faced no other ballot-listed candidate in the general election.

2022 Illinois' 5th legislative district election results
Party	Candidate	Votes	%
Democratic	Patricia Van Pelt (incumbent)	45,337	100.0
Total votes		45,337	100.0
Democratic hold			

=== District 6 ===
The district had been represented by Democrat Sara Feigenholtz since her appointment on January 22, 2020. Feigenholtz was elected unopposed in 2020. Nicole Drewery, a financial examiner, was the Republican nominee.

2022 Illinois' 6th legislative district election results
Party	Candidate	Votes	%
Democratic	Sara Feigenholtz (incumbent)	68,355	83.04
Republican	Nicole Drewery	13,959	16.96
Write-in		1	0.00
Total votes		82,315	100.0
Democratic hold			

=== District 7 ===
The district had been represented by Democrat Heather Steans since her appointment on February 10, 2008. She was re-elected unopposed in 2020. On January 19, 2021, Steans announced that she would be retiring her seat on January 31. Fellow state Representative Kelly Cassidy and CEO of Blue Sky Strategies Mike Simmons were considered the front runners for appointment. While at first the votes were divided, Simmons was chosen by the district's Democratic committeepersons. Simmons was sworn in on February 6, 2021. He faced no other ballot-listed candidates in the general election.

2022 Illinois' 7th legislative district election results
Party	Candidate	Votes	%
Democratic	Mike Simmons (incumbent)	66,145	100.0
Total votes		66,145	100.0
Democratic hold			

=== District 8 ===
The district had been represented by Democrat Ram Villivalam since January 5, 2019. Villivalam was first elected unopposed in 2018. He faced no other ballot-listed candidates in the general election.

2022 Illinois' 8th legislative district election results
Party	Candidate	Votes	%
Democratic	Ram Villivalam (incumbent)	42,341	100.0
Total votes		42,341	100.0
Democratic hold			

=== District 9 ===
The district had been represented by Democrat Laura Fine since January 6, 2019. Fine was first elected with 71.8% of the vote in 2018. Paul T. Kelly was nominated as the Republican nominee.

2022 Illinois 9th legislative district election results
Party	Candidate	Votes	%
Democratic	Laura Fine (incumbent)	62,103	76.44
Republican	Paul T. Kelly	19,143	23.56
Total votes		81,246	100.0
Democratic hold			

=== District 10 ===
The district had been represented by Democrat Robert Martwick since his appointment on June 28, 2019. Martwick was re-elected with 53.8% of the vote in 2020. Martwick faced Erin Jones, a former CPD police officer, for the Democratic nomination. Martwick won renomination and faced no other ballot-listed candidates in the general election.

Democratic primary results
Party	Candidate	Votes	%
Democratic	Robert Martwick (incumbent)	14,280	66.85
Democratic	Erin Elizabeth Jones	7,081	33.15
Total votes		21,361	100.0

2022 Illinois' 10th legislative district election results
Party	Candidate	Votes	%
Democratic	Robert Martwick (incumbent)	44,943	98.87
Write-in		515	1.13
Total votes		45,458	100.0
Democratic hold			

=== District 11 ===
The district had been represented by Democrat Celina Villanueva since her appointment on January 7, 2020. She was elected with 79.7% of the vote in 2020. Villanueva was redistricted to the boundaries of the 12th Legislative district and ran for re-election in her new district. Mike Porfirio, a commander in the United States Navy Reserve, was the Democratic nominee. Thomas "Mac" McGill was nominated as the Republican nominee.

2022 Illinois' 11th legislative district election results
Party	Candidate	Votes	%
Democratic	Mike Porfirio	29,481	66.16
Republican	Thomas "Mac" McGill	15,077	33.84
Total votes		44,558	100.0
Democratic hold			

=== District 12 ===
The district had been represented by Democrat Steven Landek since his appointment on February 5, 2011. Landek was re-elected unopposed in 2018. Landek was redistricted to the 11th Legislative district and declined to run for re-election. Celina Villanueva, state Senator of the 11th Legislative district, was redistricted to the 12th district. Villanueva faced Javier Yanez, former chief of staff for Alderman Byron Sigcho-Lopez, for the Democratic nomination. Villanueva won the nomination and faced no other ballot-listed candidates in the general election.

Democratic primary results
Party	Candidate	Votes	%
Democratic	Celina Villanueva	6,994	68.72
Democratic	Javier Yanez	3,184	31.28
Total votes		10,178	100.0

2022 Illinois' 12th legislative district election results
Party	Candidate	Votes	%
Democratic	Celina Villanueva	23,303	100.0
Total votes		23,303	100.0
Democratic hold			

=== District 13 ===
The district had been represented by Democrat Robert Peters since his appointment on January 6, 2019. Peters was elected unopposed in 2020. He faced no other ballot-listed candidates in the general election.

2022 Illinois' 13th legislative district election results
Party	Candidate	Votes	%
Democratic	Robert Peters (incumbent)	48,429	100.0
Total votes		48,429	100.0
Democratic hold			

=== District 14 ===
The district had been represented by Democratic Deputy Majority Leader Emil Jones III since January 14, 2009. Jones was re-elected unopposed in 2018. He faced no other ballot-listed candidates in the general election.

2022 Illinois' 14th legislative district election results
Party	Candidate	Votes	%
Democratic	Emil Jones III (incumbent)	49,237	100.0
Total votes		49,237	100.0
Democratic hold			

=== District 15 ===
The district had been represented by Democrat Napoleon Harris since January 9, 2013. Harris was re-elected unopposed in 2018. He faced no other ballot-listed candidates in the general election.

2022 Illinois' 15th legislative district election results
Party	Candidate	Votes	%
Democratic	Napoleon B. Harris, III (incumbent)	51,700	100.0
Total votes		51,700	100.0
Democratic hold			

=== District 16 ===
The district had been represented by Democratic Assistant Majority Leader Jacqueline Y. Collins since January 8, 2003. Collins was re-elected unopposed in 2020. Collins ran for the Democratic nomination in Illinois's 1st congressional district. Willie Preston, a small business owner, and La'Mont Raymond Williams, an attorney, ran for the Democratic nomination. Preston won the nomination and faced no other ballot-listed candidates in the general election.

Democratic primary results
Party	Candidate	Votes	%
Democratic	Willie Preston	9,473	54.28
Democratic	LaMont Raymond Williams	7,978	45.72
Total votes		17,451	100.0

2022 Illinois' 16th legislative district election results
Party	Candidate	Votes	%
Democratic	Willie Preston	38,713	100.0
Total votes		38,713	100.0
Democratic hold			

=== District 17 ===
The district had been represented by Elgie Sims since his appointment on January 26, 2018. Sims was elected with 100.0% of the vote in 2018. He faced no other ballot-listed candidates in the general election.

2022 Illinois' 17th legislative district election results
Party	Candidate	Votes	%
Democratic	Elgie R. Sims, Jr. (incumbent)	51,061	99.95
Write-in		24	0.05
Total votes		51,085	100.0
Democratic hold			

=== District 18 ===
The district had been represented by Democrat President pro tempore Bill Cunningham since January 9, 2013. Cunningham was re-elected unopposed in 2018. Christine Shanahan McGovern, a business owner, was the Republican nominee.

2022 Illinois' 18th legislative district election results
Party	Candidate	Votes	%
Democratic	Bill Cunningham (incumbent)	45,430	59.35
Republican	Christine Shanahan McGovern	31,111	40.65
Total votes		76,541	100.0
Democratic hold			

=== District 19 ===
The district had been represented by Democrat Michael Hastings since January 9, 2013. Hastings was re-elected unopposed in 2020. Patrick Sheehan, a police officer, was the Republican nominee.

2022 Illinois' 19th legislative district election results
Party	Candidate	Votes	%
Democratic	Michael Hastings (incumbent)	41,905	50.59
Republican	Patrick Sheehan	40,924	49.41
Total votes		82,829	100.0
Democratic hold			

=== District 20 ===
The district had been represented by Democrat Iris Martinez January 8, 2003. Martinez was re-elected unopposed in 2018. After being elected Clerk of the Circuit Court of Cook County, Martinez resigned her seat in November 2020. Cristina Pacione-Zayas, former associate vice-president of the Erikson Institute, was appointed on December 22, 2020. Patrycja "PR" Karlin, an attorney, was the Republican nominee.

2022 Illinois' 20th legislative district election results
Party	Candidate	Votes	%
Democratic	Cristina Pacione-Zayas (incumbent)	44,972	86.26
Republican	Patrycja "PR" Karlin	7,164	13.74
Total votes		52,136	100.0
Democratic hold			

=== District 21 ===
The district had been represented by Democrat Laura Ellman since January 9, 2019. She was first elected with 50.6% of the vote in 2018. Kathleen Murray, a small business owner, was the Republican nominee.

2022 Illinois Senate district 21 candidate forum
No.	Date	Host	Moderator	Link	Democratic	Republican
Key: P Participant A Absent N Not invited I Invited W Withdrawn						
Key: P Participant A Absent N Not invited I Invited W Withdrawn					Laura Ellman	Kathleen Murray
1	Oct. 13, 2022	League of Women Voters of Glen Ellyn and Naperville	Carol Tidwell	YouTube	P	P

2022 Illinois' 21st legislative district election results
Party	Candidate	Votes	%
Democratic	Laura Ellman (incumbent)	51,200	58.80
Republican	Kathleen Murray	35,876	41.20
Total votes		87,076	100.0
Democratic hold			

=== District 22 ===
The district had been represented by Democrat Cristina Castro since January 11, 2017. Castro was re-elected unopposed in 2020. She faced no other ballot-listed candidates in the general election.

2022 Illinois' 22nd legislative district election results
Party	Candidate	Votes	%
Democratic	Cristina Castro (incumbent)	29,318	100.0
Total votes		29,318	100.0
Democratic hold			

=== District 23 ===
The district had been represented by Democrat Tom Cullerton since January 9, 2013. Cullerton was re-elected with 54.9% of the vote in 2018. Cullerton resigned his seat on February 23, 2022, after announcing his intent to plead guilty to federal embezzlement charges. Diane Pappas, former state representative from the 45th district, was appointed to the seat on March 9, 2022. Suzy Glowiak, an engineer and state senator from the 24th district, was the Democratic nominee. Dennis Reboletti, a former state representative, was the Republican nominee.

2022 Illinois' 23rd legislative district election results
Party	Candidate	Votes	%
Democratic	Suzanne "Suzy" Glowiak Hilton	39,460	54.61
Republican	Dennis M. Reboletti	32,803	45.39
Total votes		72,263	100.0
Democratic hold			

=== District 24 ===
The district had been represented by Democrat Suzy Glowiak since January 9, 2019. She was first elected with 50.8% of the vote in 2018. Glowiak was redistricted to the 23rd Legislative district and ran for re-election in her new district. Seth Lewis, state representative from the 45th district, was the Republican nominee. Laurie Nowak, a former member of the DuPage County Board, was the Democratic nominee.

2022 Illinois' 24th legislative district election results
Party	Candidate	Votes	%
Republican	Seth Lewis	43,567	51.93
Democratic	Lauren "Laurie" Nowak	40,329	48.07
Total votes		83,896	100.0
Republican gain from Democratic			

=== District 25 ===
The district had been represented by Democrat Karina Villa since January 13, 2021. She was first elected with 51.0% of the vote in 2020. Heather Brown, a West Chicago city alderwoman, was the Republican nominee.

2022 Illinois' 25th legislative district election results
Party	Candidate	Votes	%
Democratic	Karina Villa (incumbent)	31,696	58.72
Republican	Heather Brown	22,279	41.28
Total votes		53,975	100.0
Democratic hold			

=== District 26 ===
The district had been represented by Republican Minority Leader Dan McConchie since his appointment on April 20, 2016. McConchie was re-elected with 54.7% of the vote in 2018. Maria Peterson, a small business owner, was the Democratic nominee.

2022 Illinois' 26th legislative district election results
Party	Candidate	Votes	%
Republican	Dan McConchie (incumbent)	44,632	50.22
Democratic	Maria Peterson	44,247	49.78
Total votes		88,879	100.0
Republican hold			

=== District 27 ===
The district had been represented by Democrat Ann Gillespie since January 9, 2019. She was first elected with 52.0% of the vote in 2018. Joshua Alvarado, a video production artist, and Bill Robertson, a former school superintendent, ran for the Republican nomination. Robertson won the nomination.

Republican primary results
Party	Candidate	Votes	%
Republican	Bill Robertson	6,562	58.96
Republican	Joshua Alvarado	4,568	41.04
Total votes		11,130	100.0

2022 Illinois' 27th legislative district election results
Party	Candidate	Votes	%
Democratic	Ann Gillespie (incumbent)	40,774	59.06
Republican	Bill Robertson	28,265	40.94
Total votes		69,039	100.0
Democratic hold			

=== District 28 ===
The district had been represented by Democratic Deputy Majority Leader Laura Murphy since her appointment on October 5, 2015. She was re-elected unopposed in 2020. Sal Raspanti, the city clerk for Park Ridge, was the Republican nominee.

2022 Illinois' 28th legislative district election results
Party	Candidate	Votes	%
Democratic	Laura M. Murphy (incumbent)	33,259	58.13
Republican	Sal Raspanti	23,958	41.87
Total votes		57,217	100.0
Democratic hold			

=== District 29 ===
The district had been represented by Democrat Julie Morrison since January 9, 2013. Morrison was re-elected with 63.2% of the vote in 2018. Morrison faced no other ballot-listed candidates in the general election.

2022 Illinois' 29th legislative district election results
Party	Candidate	Votes	%
Democratic	Julie A. Morrison (incumbent)	62,332	100.0
Total votes		62,332	100.0
Democratic hold			

== Districts 30–59 ==
=== District 30 ===
The district had been represented by Democrat Terry Link since January 8, 1997. He was re-elected with 68.0% of the vote in 2018. Terry Link resigned his seat on September 12, 2020, because of "roughly a month after he was charged with a federal count of income tax evasion." On September 16, 2020, Link "pleaded guilty to a federal count of filing a false tax return." Adriane Johnson, a chamber of commerce president, was appointed on October 12, 2020. Johnson faced no other ballot-listed candidates in the general election.

2022 Illinois' 30th legislative district election results
Party	Candidate	Votes	%
Democratic	Adriane Johnson (incumbent)	38,027	100.0
Total votes		38,027	100.0
Democratic hold			

=== District 31 ===
The district had been represented by Democrat Melinda Bush since January 9, 2013. Bush was re-elected with 58.5% of the vote in 2020. She was not seeking re-election. Mary Edly-Allen, a former state representative from the 51st district, and Sam Yingling, state representative from the 62nd district, ran for the Democratic nomination. Edly-Allen won the nomination. Adam Solano, a financial advisor, was the Republican nominee.

Democratic primary results
Party	Candidate	Votes	%
Democratic	Mary Edly-Allen	8,422	55.12
Democratic	Sam Yingling	6,858	44.88
Total votes		15,280	100.0

2022 Illinois' 31st legislative district election results
Party	Candidate	Votes	%
Democratic	Mary Edly-Allen	36,702	56.78
Republican	Adam A. Solano	27,934	43.22
Total votes		64,636	100.0
Democratic hold			

=== District 32 ===
The district had been represented by Republican Craig Wilcox since his appointment on October 1, 2018. Wilcox was elected with 54.7% of the vote in 2018. Allena Barbato, an attorney, was the Democratic nominee.

2022 Illinois' 32nd legislative district election results
Party	Candidate	Votes	%
Republican	Craig Wilcox (incumbent)	45,583	55.87
Democratic	Allena Barbato	36,009	44.13
Total votes		81,592	100.0
Republican hold			

=== District 33 ===
The district had been represented by Republican Assistant Minority Leader Don DeWitte since his appointment in September 2018. DeWitte was elected with 50.6% of the vote in 2018. He faced no other ballot-listed candidates in the general election.

2022 Illinois' 33rd legislative district election results
Party	Candidate	Votes	%
Republican	Donald P. DeWitte (incumbent)	56,883	100.0
Total votes		56,883	100.0
Republican hold			

=== District 34 ===
The district had been represented by Democrat Steve Stadelman since January 9, 2013. Stadelman was re-elected with 61.7% of the vote in 2020. Juan Reyes, a former police officer, was the Republican nominee.

2022 Illinois' 34th legislative district election results
Party	Candidate	Votes	%
Democratic	Steve Stadelman (incumbent)	33,539	58.59
Republican	Juan Reyes	23,707	41.41
Total votes		57,246	100.0
Democratic hold			

=== District 35 ===
The district had been represented by Republican Dave Syverson since January 9, 2013. He previously represented the 34th district from 1993 to January 9, 2013. Syverson was re-elected unopposed in 2018. Sylverson defeated Eli Nicolosi, Winnebago County Republican Central Committee Chairperson, for the Republican nomination. Syverson faced no other ballot-listed candidates in the general election.

Republican primary results
Party	Candidate	Votes	%
Republican	Dave Syverson (incumbent)	15,856	75.19
Republican	Eli Nicolosi	5,231	24.81
Total votes		21,087	100.0

2022 Illinois' 35th legislative district election results
Party	Candidate	Votes	%
Republican	Dave Syverson (incumbent)	65,233	100.0
Total votes		65,233	100.0
Republican hold			

=== District 36 ===
The district had been represented by Republican Neil Anderson since January 8, 2015. Anderson was re-elected with 50.8% of the vote in 2018. After being redistricted, Anderson ran for re-election in the 47th legislative district. Glen Evans, a minister, and Rock Island Mayor Mike Thoms ran for the Republican nomination. Thoms won the nomination. Michael Halpin, member of the Illinois House of Representatives for the 72nd Representative district, was the Democratic nominee.

Republican primary results
Party	Candidate	Votes	%
Republican	Mike Thoms	7,862	67.76
Republican	Glen Evans Sr.	3,740	32.24
Total votes		11,602	100.0

2022 Illinois' 36th legislative district election results
Party	Candidate	Votes	%
Democratic	Michael W. Halpin	38,454	54.63
Republican	Mike Thoms	31,932	45.37
Total votes		70,386	100.0
Democratic gain from Republican			

=== District 37 ===
The district had been represented by Republican Win Stoller since January 13, 2021. Stoller was first elected with 99.71% of the vote in 2020. Stoller defeated Brett Nicklaus, a certified financial planner, for the Republican nomination. He faced no other ballot-listed candidates in the general election.

Republican primary results
Party	Candidate	Votes	%
Republican	Win Stoller (incumbent)	11,170	51.22
Republican	Brett S. Nicklaus	10,637	48.78
Total votes		21,807	100.0

2022 Illinois' 37th legislative district election results
Party	Candidate	Votes	%
Republican	Win Stoller (incumbent)	66,467	100.0
Total votes		66,467	100.0
Republican hold			

=== District 38 ===
The district had been represented by Republican Deputy Minority Leader Sue Rezin since December 11, 2010. Rezin was re-elected with 59.4% of the vote in 2018. She faced no other ballot-listed candidates in the general election.

2022 Illinois' 38th legislative district election results
Party	Candidate	Votes	%
Republican	Sue Rezin (incumbent)	59,006	100.0
Total votes		59,006	100.0
Republican hold			

=== District 39 ===
The district had been represented by Democratic Senate President Don Harmon since January 3, 2003. Harmon was re-elected unopposed in 2018. He faced no other ballot-listed candidates in the general election.

2022 Illinois' 39th legislative district election results
Party	Candidate	Votes	%
Democratic	Don Harmon (incumbent)	47,658	100.0
Total votes		47,658	100.0
Democratic hold			

=== District 40 ===
The district had been represented by Democrat Patrick Joyce since his appointment on November 8, 2019. Joyce was elected with 58.5% of the vote in 2020. Philip Nagel, a former United States Air Force crew chief, and Krystyna Vela, a real estate agent, ran for the Republican nomination. Nagel won the nomination.

Republican primary results
Party	Candidate	Votes	%
Republican	Philip Nagel	9,304	78.55
Republican	Krystyna Vela	2,541	21.45
Total votes		11,845	100.0

2022 Illinois' 40th legislative district election results
Party	Candidate	Votes	%
Democratic	Patrick J. Joyce (incumbent)	36,977	55.34
Republican	Philip Nagel	29,842	44.66
Total votes		66,819	100.0
Democratic hold			

=== District 41 ===
The district had been represented by Republican John Curran since his appointment on July 23, 2017. Curran was elected with 50.8% of the vote in 2018. He faced no other ballot-listed candidates in the general election.

2022 Illinois' 41st legislative district election results
Party	Candidate	Votes	%
Republican	John Curran (incumbent)	64,100	100.0
Total votes		64,100	100.0
Republican hold			

=== District 42 ===
The district had been represented by Democratic Assistant Majority Leader Linda Holmes since January 10, 2007. Holmes was re-elected unopposed in 2018. Paul J. Santucci, an adjunct professor at North Central College, was the Republican nominee.

2022 Illinois' 42nd legislative district election results
Party	Candidate	Votes	%
Democratic	Linda Holmes (incumbent)	40,896	60.25
Republican	Paul J. Santucci	26,976	39.75
Total votes		67,872	100.0
Democratic hold			

=== District 43 ===
The district had been represented by Democrat John Connor since January 13, 2021. Connor previously represented the 85th Representative district in the Illinois House from 2017 to 2021. Connor was first elected to the district with 64.5% of the vote in 2020. Connor resigned his seat on April 30, 2020, to care for an immediate family member. Eric Mattson, a firefighter, was appointed on May 6, 2022. Rachel Ventura, a member of the Will County board, defeated Mattson for the Democratic nomination. Dianne Harris, a small business owner, and Michelle Lee, a Joliet Junior College board of trustees member, ran for the Republican nomination. Harris won the nomination.

Democratic primary results
Party	Candidate	Votes	%
Democratic	Rachel Ventura	7,593	57.65
Democratic	Eric Mattson (incumbent)	5,578	42.35
Total votes		13,171	100.0

Republican primary results
Party	Candidate	Votes	%
Republican	Diane M. Harris	5,050	50.75
Republican	Michelle Lee	4,900	49.25
Total votes		9,950	100.0

2022 Illinois' 43rd legislative district election results
Party	Candidate	Votes	%
Democratic	Rachel Ventura	33,667	56.05
Republican	Diane M. Harris	26,396	43.95
Total votes		60,063	100.0
Democratic hold			

=== District 44 ===
The district had been represented by Republican Bill Brady since his appointment in May 2002. He was re-elected unopposed in 2018. On December 31, 2020, Brady resigned from the Illinois Senate. Former Logan County Clerk Sally Turner was appointed on January 25, 2021. Turner faced no other ballot-listed candidates in the general election.

2022 Illinois' 44th legislative district election results
Party	Candidate	Votes	%
Republican	Sally J. Turner (incumbent)	75,666	100.0
Total votes		75,666	100.0
Republican hold			

=== District 45 ===
The district had been represented by Republican Brian W. Stewart since December 5, 2018. He previously represented the 89th Representative district in the Illinois House from 2013 to 2018. Stewart was first elected with 62.6% of the vote in 2018. Stewart announced he would not seek re-election on January 14, 2022. State Representative Andrew Chesney from the 89th Representative district was the Republican nominee. Gerald Podraza, a small business owner, was the Democratic nominee.

2022 Illinois' 45th legislative district election results
Party	Candidate	Votes	%
Republican	Andrew S. Chesney	56,171	66.44
Democratic	Gerald H. Podraza	28,368	33.56
Total votes		84,539	100.0
Republican hold			

=== District 46 ===
The district had been represented by Democratic Assistant Majority Leader Dave Koehler since December 3, 2006. Koehler was re-elected with 53.9% of the vote in 2020. Desi Anderson, a business owner, was the Republican nominee.

2022 Illinois' 46th legislative district election results
Party	Candidate	Votes	%
Democratic	Dave Koehler (incumbent)	38,672	58.07
Republican	Desi Anderson	27,924	41.93
Total votes		66,596	100.0
Democratic hold			

=== District 47 ===
The district had been represented by Republican Jil Tracy since January 11, 2017. Tracy was re-elected with 99.7% of the vote in 2018. State Senator Neil Anderson from the 36th legislative district ran against her for the Republican nomination. This was due to him being drawn out of his district from redistricting. Anderson faced no other ballot-listed candidates in the general election.

2022 Illinois' 47th legislative district election results
Party	Candidate	Votes	%
Republican	Neil Anderson (incumbent)	70,738	100.0
Total votes		70,738	100.0
Republican hold			

=== District 48 ===
The district had been represented by Democrat Andy Manar since January 9, 2013. He was re-elected with 56.8% of the vote in 2018. On January 17, 2021, Manar resigned from the Illinois Senate to work as a senior advisor for J. B. Pritzker's administration. Springfield City Council and Sangamon County Board member Doris Turner was appointed on February 6, 2021. Sandy Hamilton, state representative from the 99th Representative district, was the Republican nominee.

2022 Illinois' 48th legislative district election results
Party	Candidate	Votes	%
Democratic	Doris Turner (incumbent)	39,138	50.92
Republican	Sandy Hamilton	37,731	49.08
Total votes		76,869	100.0
Democratic hold			

=== District 49 ===
The district had been represented by Democrat Meg Loughran Cappel since January 13, 2021. Cappel was first elected with 56.2% of the vote in 2020. Stacey Keagle, a nurse, James Lawson, an electrician, and Felicity Joy Solomon, a life coach, all ran for the Republican nomination. Keagle would initially win the nomination but later dropped out of the race on August 26, 2022, due to health issues. With the Republican Party unable to nominate a new candidate, Cappel faced no other ballot-listed candidates in the general election.

Republican primary results
Party	Candidate	Votes	%
Republican	Stacey Keagle	5,003	46.75
Republican	James E. Lawson, Jr.	4,109	38.40
Republican	Felicity Joy Solomon	1,589	14.85
Total votes		10,701	100.0

2022 Illinois' 49th legislative district election results
Party	Candidate	Votes	%
Democratic	Meg Loughran Cappel (incumbent)	48,969	100.0
Total votes		48,969	100.0
Democratic hold			

=== District 50 ===
The district had been represented by Republican Assistant Minority Leader Steve McClure since January 9, 2019. McClure was first elected unopposed in 2018. McClure was redistricted to the 54th legislative district and ran for re-election in his new district. State Senator Jil Tracy from the 47th legislative district was redistricted to the 50th and faced no other ballot-listed candidates in the general election.

2022 Illinois' 50th legislative district election results
Party	Candidate	Votes	%
Republican	Jil Tracy	73,674	100.0
Write-in		1	0.00
Total votes		73,675	100.0
Republican hold			

=== District 51 ===
The district had been represented by Republican Assistant Minority Leader Chapin Rose since January 9, 2013. Rose was re-elected unopposed in 2018. Rose faced no other ballot-listed candidates in the general election.

2022 Illinois' 51st legislative district election results
Party	Candidate	Votes	%
Republican	Chapin Rose (incumbent)	72,990	100.0
Total votes		72,990	100.0
Republican hold			

=== District 52 ===
Democrat Scott M. Bennett represented the district since his appointment on January 12, 2015, and was re-elected with 63.4% of the vote in 2020. Bennett faced no other ballot-listed candidates in the primary or general election, but died following the election on December 9. Champaign Township Assessor Paul Faraci was appointed to serve out Bennett's term and was sworn into office on January 11, 2023.

2022 Illinois' 52nd legislative district election results
Party	Candidate	Votes	%
Democratic	Scott M. Bennett (incumbent)	50,880	100.0
Total votes		50,880	100.0
Democratic hold			

=== District 53 ===
The district had been represented by Republican Jason Barickman since January 9, 2013. Barickman was re-elected unopposed in 2018. Barickman faced no other ballot-listed candidates in the general election.

2022 Illinois' 53rd legislative district election results
Party	Candidate	Votes	%
Republican	Jason Barickman (incumbent)	71,697	100.0
Total votes		71,697	100.0
Republican hold			

=== District 54 ===
The district had been represented by Republican Assistant Minority Leader Jason Plummer since January 9, 2019. Plummer was first elected with 70.0% of the vote in 2018. Plummer was redistricted to the 55th legislative district and ran for re-election in his new district. State Senator Steve McClure from the 50th legislative district was redistricted to the 54th. McClure defeated Donald Debolt, a certified public accountant, for the Republican nomination. He faced no other ballot-listed candidates in the general election.

Republican primary results
Party	Candidate	Votes	%
Republican	Steve McClure	18,041	59.87
Republican	Donald Debolt	12,095	40.13
Total votes		30,136	100.0

2022 Illinois' 54th legislative district election results
Party	Candidate	Votes	%
Republican	Steve McClure	76,814	100.0
Total votes		76,814	100.0
Republican hold			

=== District 55 ===
The district had been represented by Republican Darren Bailey since January 13, 2021. Bailey was first elected with 76.7% of the vote in 2020. On February 22, 2021, Bailey announced his intention to run in the 2022 Illinois gubernatorial election and would be nominated as the Republican nominee. State Senator Jason Plummer from the 54th legislative district was redistricted and faced no other ballot-listed candidates in the general election.

2022 Illinois' 55th legislative district election results
Party	Candidate	Votes	%
Republican	Jason Plummer	75,849	100.0
Total votes		75,849	100.0
Republican hold			

=== District 56 ===
The district had been represented by Democrat Rachelle Crowe since January 9, 2019. Crowe was first elected with 58.4% of the vote in 2018. After being nominated to serve as United States Attorney for the Southern District of Illinois, Crowe resigned from the Senate on June 15, 2022. Kris Tharp, a police officer, was appointed to the district on July 8, 2022. Erica Harriss, a member of the Madison County board, was the Republican nominee.

2022 Illinois' 56th legislative district election results
Party	Candidate	Votes	%
Republican	Erica Conway Harriss	37,459	51.10
Democratic	Kris Tharp (incumbent)	35,843	48.90
Total votes		73,302	100.0
Republican gain from Democratic			

=== District 57 ===
The district had been represented by Democrat Christopher Belt since January 9, 2019. Belt was first elected with 59.2% of the vote in 2018. Wavey Lester, a military veteran, was the Republican nominee.

2022 Illinois' 57th legislative district election results
Party	Candidate	Votes	%
Democratic	Christopher Belt (incumbent)	41,880	57.66
Republican	Wavey T. Lester II	30,746	42.33
Write-in		8	0.01
Total votes		72,634	100.0
Democratic hold			

=== District 58 ===
The district had been represented by Republican Terri Bryant since January 13, 2021. She was first elected unopposed in 2020. She faced no other ballot-listed candidates in the general election.

2022 Illinois' 58th legislative district election results
Party	Candidate	Votes	%
Republican	Terri Bryant (incumbent)	73,954	100.0
Total votes		73,954	100.0
Republican hold			

=== District 59 ===
The district had been represented by Republican Dale Fowler since January 11, 2017. Fowler was re-elected with 61.1% of the vote in 2018. He faced no other ballot-listed candidates in the general election.

2022 Illinois' 59th legislative district election results
Party	Candidate	Votes	%
Republican	Dale Fowler (incumbent)	65,708	100.0
Total votes		65,708	100.0
Republican hold			

== See also ==
- List of Illinois state legislatures
