= 2020 Illinois Senate election =

2020 Illinois Senate elections
- November 3, 2020

22 of 59 seats in the Illinois Senate 30 seats needed for a majority
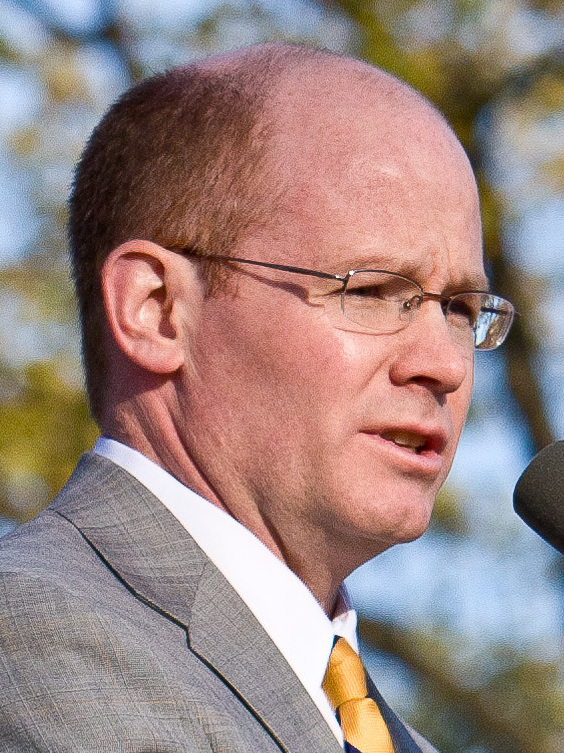

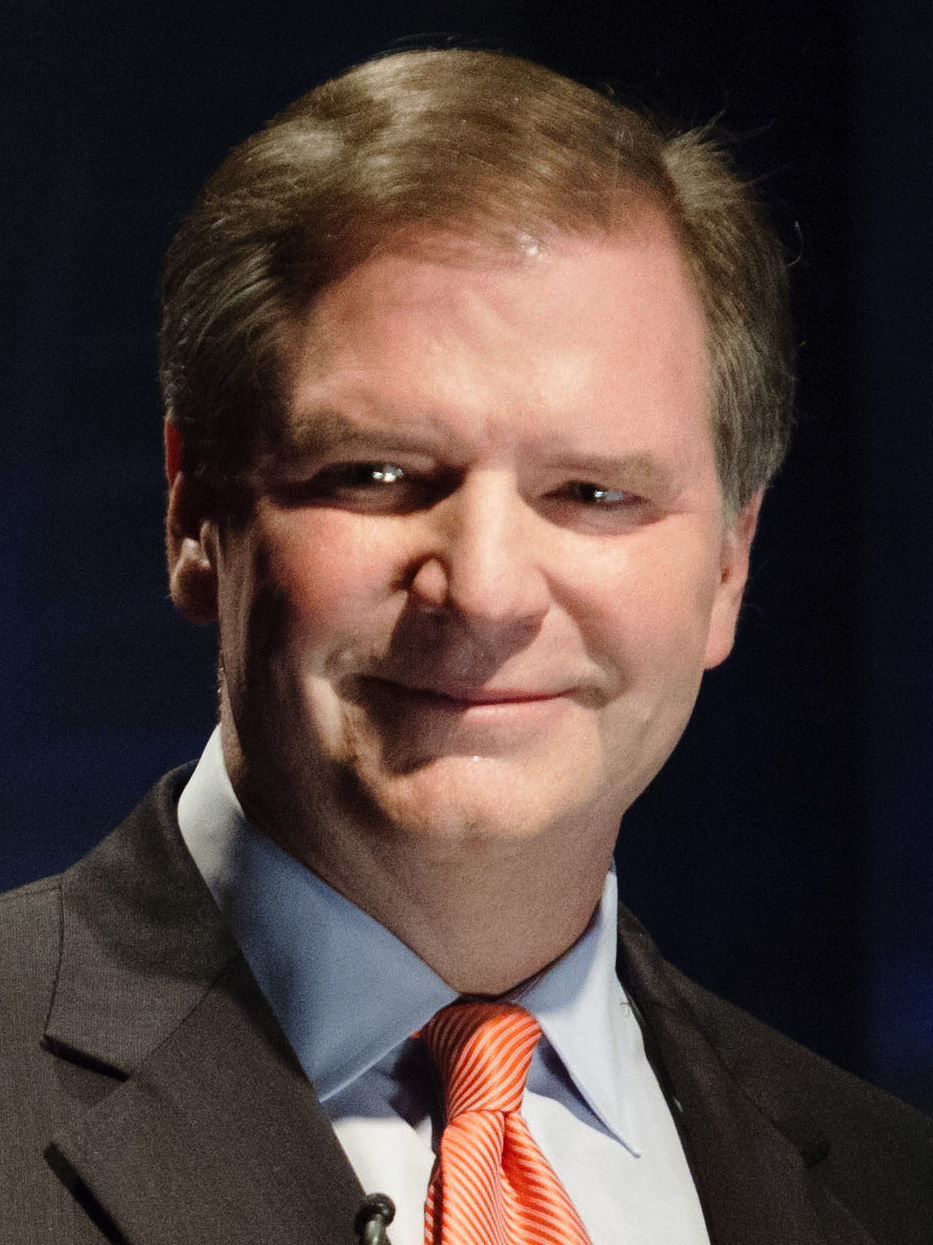
	Majority party	Minority party
Leader	Don Harmon	Bill Brady
Party	Democratic	Republican
Leader's seat	6th-Chicago	44th-Bloomington
Last election	40	19
Seats won	41	18
Seat change	▲1	▼1
Popular vote	1,261,848	627,734
Percentage	66.35%	33.01%
Swing	▲8.90%	▼8.38%
- Democratic gain Democratic hold Republican hold No election 50–60% 60–70% >90% 70–80% >90%
Senate President before election
Don Harmon
Democratic
Elected Senate President
Don Harmon
Democratic

The 2020 elections for the Illinois Senate took place on November 3, 2020, to elect senators from 22 of the state's 59 Senate districts to serve in the 102nd General Assembly, with seats apportioned among the states based on the 2010 United States census. Under the Illinois Constitution of 1970, senators are divided into three groups, each group having a two-year term at a different part of the decade between censuses, with the rest of the decade being taken up by two four-year terms. The Democratic Party has held a majority in the Senate since 2003. The inauguration of the 102nd General Assembly occurred on Wednesday January 13, 2021.

The elections for United States President, Illinois United States Senator, Illinois's 18 congressional districts, the Illinois Fair Tax and the Illinois House were held on this date.

The Republican Party needed to gain 11 seats to earn a majority in the Senate. The Democratic Party gained one seat towards their already-existing supermajority.

== Overview ==
2020 Illinois Senate general election results
Party	Votes	Percentage	% change	Total seats before	Seats up	Seats won	Total Seats after	+/–
Democratic	1,261,848	66.35%	▲8.90%	40	18	19	41	▲1
Republican	627,734	33.01%	▼8.38%	19	4	3	18	▼1
Democracy in America	11,916	0.63%	N/A	0	0	0	0	0
Write-ins	275	0.01%	▲0.01%	N/A	N/A	N/A	N/A	0
Totals	1,901,773	100.00%	N/A	59	22	22	59	—

== Predictions ==
Source	Ranking	As of
The Cook Political Report	Safe D	October 21, 2020

== Close races ==
District	Winner	Margin
District 10	Democratic	7.58%
District 25	Democratic (gain)	1.92%
District 46	Democratic	7.78%

== Senate President election ==
On November 14, 2019, then-Senate President John Cullerton announced he would retire from the Illinois Senate. Then-Assistant Majority Leader Don Harmon and Majority Leader Kimberly A. Lightford were the two lawmakers being backed for the Senate President election. Harmon was elected as the 39th Senate President of the Illinois Senate on January 19, 2020.

== Elections by district ==
=== District 1 ===
The 1st district, located in the Chicago area, includes parts of Forest View as well as all or parts of the Chicago neighborhoods of Archer Heights, Armour Square, Bridgeport, Brighton Park, Chicago Lawn, Garfield Ridge, Lower West Side, McKinley Park, Near South Side, Near West Side, New City, and West Elsdon. The district had been represented by Democrat Antonio Munoz since January 9, 1999. Munoz faced Froy Jimenez, a CPS history teacher and soccer coach, for the Democratic nomination. After winning the Democratic nomination, Munoz faced no other ballot-listed candidates in the general election.

==== Endorsements ====
Antonio Munoz

Organizations

- Equality Illinois
- SEIU Healthcare

==== Results ====
Democratic primary
Party	Candidate	Votes	%
Democratic	Antonio "Tony" Munoz (incumbent)	15,912	61.73
Democratic	Froylan "Froy" Jimenez	9,864	38.27
Total votes		25,776	100.0

General election
Party	Candidate	Votes	%
Democratic	Antonio "Tony" Munoz (incumbent)	47,959	100.0
Total votes		47,959	100.0
Democratic hold			

=== District 4 ===
The 4th district, located in the Chicago area, includes all or parts of Bellwood, Berkeley, Berwyn, Broadview, Brookfield, Forest Park, Hillside, La Grange, La Grange Park, Maywood, Melrose Park, North Riverside, Northlake, Oak Brook, Oak Park, River Forest, Westchester, and Western Springs and parts of the Chicago neighborhood of Austin. The district had been represented by Democrat Kimberly A. Lightford since November 20, 1998. Lightford faced no other ballot-listed candidates in the general election.

==== Endorsements ====
Kimberly Lightford

Organizations

- Equality Illinois
- SEIU Healthcare

==== Results ====
Democratic primary
Party	Candidate	Votes	%
Democratic	Kimberly A. Lightford (incumbent)	37,910	100.0
Total votes		37,910	100.0

General election
Party	Candidate	Votes	%
Democratic	Kimberly A. Lightford (incumbent)	83,559	100.0
Total votes		83,559	100.0
Democratic hold			

=== District 6 ===
The 6th district includes parts of the Chicago neighborhoods of Albany Park, Avondale, Irving Park, Lake View, Lincoln Park, Lincoln Square, Logan Square, North Center, Near North Side, and Uptown. The district was represented by Democrat John Cullerton since his appointment in 1991 and served as Senate President from 2009 to 2020. On November 14, 2019, Cullerton announced he would retire from the Illinois Senate. State Representative Sara Feigenholtz from the 12th district was appointed to the seat on January 22, 2020. No primary election was held and Feigenholtz faced no other ballot-listed candidates in the general election.

General election
Party	Candidate	Votes	%
Democratic	Sara Feigenholtz (incumbent)	106,220	100.0
Total votes		106,220	100.0
Democratic hold			

=== District 7 ===
The 7th district, located in the Chicago area, includes parts of Evanston and includes all or parts of the Chicago neighborhoods of Albany Park, Edgewater, Lake View, North Center, North Park, Rogers Park, Uptown, and West Ridge. The district had been represented by Democrat Heather Steans since her appointment on February 10, 2008. Steans faced no other ballot-listed candidates in the general election.

==== Endorsements ====
Heather Steans

Organizations

- Equality Illinois

Democratic primary
Party	Candidate	Votes	%
Democratic	Heather A. Steans (incumbent)	47,121	100.0
Total votes		47,121	100.0

General election
Party	Candidate	Votes	%
Democratic	Heather A. Steans (incumbent)	90,009	100.0
Total votes		90,009	100.0
Democratic hold			

=== District 10 ===
The 10th district, located in the Chicago area, includes parts of Des Plaines, Elmwood Park, Franklin Park, Harwood Heights, Niles, Norridge, Park Ridge, River Grove, Rosemont, and Schiller Park and includes parts of the Chicago neighborhoods of Dunning, Edison Park, Forest Glen, Jefferson Park, Norwood Park, O'Hare, and Portage Park. The district had been represented by Democrat John Mulroe since his appointment in August 2010. Mulroe announced he would step down as a state senator on June 21, 2019, to become a judge in the 10th Cook County Judicial Subcircuit. State Representative Robert Martwick was appointed on June 28, 2019, to fill the vacancy. Martwick faced Danny O'Toole, a sergeant with the Chicago Police Department, for the Democratic nomination. Martwick won the Democratic nomination. Anthony Beckman, a police officer from Norridge, was the Republican nominee.

==== Endorsements ====
Robert Martwick

Organizations

- Chicago Teachers Union
- Equality Illinois
- National Association of Social Workers Illinois chapter
- SEIU Healthcare

Newspapers

- Chicago Sun-Times

==== Results ====
Democratic primary
Party	Candidate	Votes	%
Democratic	Robert Martwick (incumbent)	17,407	54.44
Democratic	Daniel "Danny" O'Toole	14,568	45.56
Total votes		31,975	100.0

Republican primary
Party	Candidate	Votes	%
Republican	Anthony Beckman	5,084	100.0
Total votes		5,084	100.0

General election
Party	Candidate	Votes	%
Democratic	Robert Martwick (incumbent)	53,351	53.79
Republican	Anthony Beckman	45,841	46.21
Total votes		99,192	100.0
Democratic hold			

=== District 11 ===
The 11th district, located in the Chicago area, includes parts of Bedford Park, Bridgeview, Burbank, Cicero, Forest View, Lyons, McCook, Riverside, Stickney, and Summit and includes all or parts of the Chicago neighborhoods of Archer Heights, Ashburn, Brighton Park, Chicago Lawn, Clearing, Gage Park, Garfield Ridge, Lower West Side, McKinley Park, South Lawndale, West Elsdon, and West Lawn. The district had been represented by Democrat Martin Sandoval since January 9, 2013. He previously served as a state senator for the 12th district from January 8, 2003, to January 9, 2013. Sandoval announced that he would resign as state senator effective January 1, 2020 amid a corruption scandal and would later on plead guilty to bribery charges. State Representative Celina Villanueva was appointed to fill the vacancy. Mary Ellen "Mari" Brown, a small business owner, ran in the general election under a new political party called Democracy in America.

==== Endorsements ====
Celina Villanueva

Organizations

- Equality Illinois
- SEIU Healthcare
- United Working Families

Newspapers

- Chicago Sun-Times
- Chicago Tribune

==== Results ====
Democratic primary
Party	Candidate	Votes	%
Democratic	Celina Villanueva (incumbent)	22,716	100.0
Total votes		22,716	100.0

General election
Party	Candidate	Votes	%
Democratic	Celina Villanueva (incumbent)	46,700	79.67
Democracy in America	Mary Ellen "Mari" Brown	11,916	20.33
Write-in		2	0.00
Total votes		58,618	100.0
Democratic hold			

=== District 13 ===
The 13th district includes all or parts of the Chicago neighborhoods of Calumet Heights, Douglas, East Side, Grand Boulevard, Hegewisch, Hyde Park, Kenwood, Loop, Near North Side, Near South Side, South Chicago, South Deering, South Shore, Washington Park, and Woodlawn. The district had been represented by Democrat Kwame Raoul since November 6, 2004. After winning in the 2018 general election to become Illinois Attorney General, Raoul vacated his state senator seat. Robert Peters, political director of Reclaim Chicago, was appointed to the seat on January 6, 2019. Peters faced Ken Thomas, an attorney, for the Democratic nomination. After winning the nomination, Peters faced no other ballot-listed candidates in the general election.

==== Endorsements ====
Robert Peters

Organizations

- Equality Illinois
- National Association of Social Workers Illinois chapter
- The People's Lobby
- Reclaim Chicago
- SEIU Healthcare
- United Working Families

==== Results ====
Democratic primary
Party	Candidate	Votes	%
Democratic	Robert Peters (incumbent)	21,646	53.26
Democratic	Ken Thomas	18,997	46.74
Total votes		40,643	100.0

General election
Party	Candidate	Votes	%
Democratic	Robert Peters (incumbent)	79,024	100.0
Total votes		79,024	100.0
Democratic hold			

=== District 16 ===
The 16th district, located in the Chicago area, includes parts of Bedford Park, Bridgeview, Burbank, Burr Ridge, Chicago Ridge, Countryside, Hickory Hills, Hodgkins, Hometown, Indian Head Park, Justice, Oak Lawn, Palos Hills, and Willow Springs and parts of the Chicago neighborhoods of Ashburn, Chicago Lawn, Englewood, Greater Grand Crossing, West Englewood, and Woodlawn. The district had been represented by Democrat Jacqueline Y. Collins since January 8, 2003. Collins faced no other ballot-listed candidates in the general election.

==== Endorsements ====
Jacqueline (Jacqui) Collins

Organizations

- Equality Illinois

Democratic primary
Party	Candidate	Votes	%
Democratic	Jacqueline "Jacqui" Collins (incumbent)	27,750	100.0
Total votes		27,750	100.0

General election
Party	Candidate	Votes	%
Democratic	Jacqueline "Jacqui" Collins (incumbent)	64,671	100.0
Total votes		64,671	100.0
Democratic hold			

=== District 19 ===
The 19th district, located in the Chicago area, includes all or parts of Country Club Hills, Flossmoor, Frankfort, Frankfort Square, Harvey, Hazel Crest, Homer Glen, Homewood, Joliet, Lockport, Markham, Matteson, Mokena, New Lenox, Oak Forest, Olympia Fields, Orland Park, Park Forest, Richton Park, Tinley Park, and University Park. The district had been represented by Democrat Michael Hastings since January 9, 2013. Hastings faced no other ballot-listed candidates in the general election.

==== Endorsements ====
Michael E. Hastings

Organizations

- Equality Illinois

==== Results ====
Democratic primary
Party	Candidate	Votes	%
Democratic	Michael E. Hastings (incumbent)	30,722	100.0
Total votes		30,722	100.0

Republican primary
Party	Candidate	Votes	%
Republican	August Deuser (write-in)	299	100.0
Total votes		299	100.0

General election
Party	Candidate	Votes	%
Democratic	Michael E. Hastings (incumbent)	90,460	100.0
Total votes		90,460	100.0
Democratic hold			

=== District 22 ===
The 22nd district, located in the Chicago area, includes all or parts of Barrington Hills, Bartlett, Carpentersville, East Dundee, Elgin, Hanover Park, Hoffman Estates, Schaumburg, Hoffman Estates, South Elgin, and Streamwood. The district had been represented by Democrat Cristina Castro since January 11, 2017. Castro faced Rae Yawer, the Commissioner of the Streamwood Park District Board, for the Democratic nomination. After winning the nomination, Castro faced no other ballot-listed candidates in the general election.

==== Endorsements ====
Cristina Castro

Organizations

- Equality Illinois
- National Association of Social Workers Illinois chapter
- SEIU Healthcare

==== Results ====
Democratic primary
Party	Candidate	Votes	%
Democratic	Cristina Castro (incumbent)	13,838	81.52
Democratic	Rae Yawer	3,136	18.48
Total votes		16,974	100.0

General election
Party	Candidate	Votes	%
Democratic	Cristina Castro (incumbent)	54,534	100.0
Total votes		54,534	100.0
Democratic hold			

=== District 25 ===
The 25th district, located in the Chicago area, includes all or parts of Aurora, Bartlett, Batavia, Big Rock, Campton Hills, Elburn, Elgin, Geneva, Geneva, Lily Lake, Montgomery, Naperville, North Aurora, Oswego, Plano, Prestbury, South Elgin, St. Charles, Sugar Grove, Warrenville, Wayne, West Chicago, and Yorkville. The district had been represented by Republican Jim Oberweis since January 9, 2013. Oberweis announced in 2019 his plans to run in the 14th congressional district, leaving his own seat open. Two candidates ran for the Republican nomination: Beth Goncher, executive director of the Sugar Grove Chamber and independent consultant and Jeanette Ward, product manager for an international chemical company. Ward won the Republican nomination. Karina Villa, the first-term state representative from the 49th district, was the Democratic nominee.

==== Endorsements ====
Jeanette Ward

State representatives

- Jeanne Ives, former representative from the 42nd district

Organizations

- Illinois Republican Party
Karina Villa

Elected officials

- Congresswoman Lauren Underwood

Organizations

- Chicago Firefighter Union Local 2
- Equality Illinois
- Farm Team Pac
- HACIA Pac
- Illinois AFL–CIO
- Illinois National Organization for Women (NOW)
- Illinois Nurses Association
- PSYPac
- SEIU Healthcare
- Sierra Club
- Stand for Children Illinois

Newspapers

- Chicago Sun-Times
- Chicago Tribune
- Daily Herald

==== Results ====
Democratic primary
Party	Candidate	Votes	%
Democratic	Karina Villa	22,918	100.0
Total votes		22,918	100.0

Republican primary
Party	Candidate	Votes	%
Republican	Jeanette Ward	8,040	59.64
Republican	Beth Goncher	5,441	40.36
Total votes		13,481	100.0

General election
Party	Candidate	Votes	%
Democratic	Karina Villa	60,238	50.96
Republican	Jeanette Ward	57,976	49.04
Total votes		118,214	100.0
Democratic gain from Republican			

=== District 28 ===
The 28th district, located in the Chicago area, includes parts of Arlington Heights, Des Plaines, Elk Grove Village, Hanover Park, Hoffman Estates, Mount Prospect, Palatine, Park Ridge, Rolling Meadows, Roselle, and Schaumburg as well as parts of the Chicago neighborhood of O'Hare. The district had been represented by Democrat Laura Murphy since her appointment on October 5, 2015. Murphy faced no other ballot-listed candidates in the general election.

==== Endorsements ====
Laura Murphy

Organizations

- Equality Illinois

==== Results ====
Democratic primary
Party	Candidate	Votes	%
Democratic	Laura Murphy (incumbent)	22,452	100.0
Total votes		22,452	100.0

Republican primary
Party	Candidate	Votes	%
Republican	Peter Dombrowski (write-in)	346	100.0
Total votes		346	100.0

General election
Party	Candidate	Votes	%
Democratic	Laura Murphy (incumbent)	71,974	100.0
Total votes		71,974	100.0
Democratic hold			

=== District 31 ===
The 31st district, located in the Chicago area, includes all or parts of Antioch, Beach Park, Gages Lake, Grandwood Park, Grayslake, Gurnee, Hainesville, Lake Villa, Lindenhurst, Long Lake, Old Mill Creek, Round Lake, Round Lake Beach, Round Lake Heights, Round Lake Park, Third Lake, Venetian Village, Volo, Wadsworth, Wauconda, Waukegan, Winthrop Harbor, and Zion. The district had been represented by Democrat Melinda Bush since January 9, 2013. Christopher Kasperski, a former combat veteran and campaign manager for State Senator Craig Wilcox, was the Republican nominee.

==== Endorsements ====
Melinda Bush

Organizations

- Equality Illinois

Newspapers

- Chicago Sun-Times
- Chicago Tribune
- Daily Herald

Democratic primary
Party	Candidate	Votes	%
Democratic	Melinda Bush (incumbent)	20,121	100.0
Total votes		20,121	100.0

Republican primary
Party	Candidate	Votes	%
Republican	Christopher Kasperski	7,219	100.0
Total votes		7,219	100.0

General election
Party	Candidate	Votes	%
Democratic	Melinda Bush (incumbent)	58,274	58.48
Republican	Christopher Kasperski	41,373	41.52
Total votes		99,647	100.0
Democratic hold			

=== District 34 ===
The 34th district, located in the Rockford metropolitan area, includes parts of Cherry Valley, Loves Park, Machesney Park, Rockford, and Roscoe. The district had been represented by Democrat Steve Stadelman since January 9, 2013. Paul Hofmann, a former worker for an aerospace company, was the Republican nominee in the general election.

Steve Stadelman

Organizations

- Equality Illinois

Democratic primary
Party	Candidate	Votes	%
Democratic	Steve Stadelman (incumbent)	17,581	100.0
Total votes		17,581	100.0

General election
Party	Candidate	Votes	%
Democratic	Steve Stadelman (incumbent)	51,382	61.69
Republican	Paul Hofmann	31,910	38.31
Total votes		83,292	100.0
Democratic hold			

=== District 37 ===
The 37th district, located partly in the Peoria metropolitan area, covers all or parts of Aledo, Alexis, Alpha, Altona, Amboy, Andover, Annawan, Atkinson, Bay View Gardens, Bishop Hill, Bradford, Brimfield, Buda, Cambridge, Chillicothe, Dana, Dover, Dunlap, East Galesburg, Elmwood, Galesburg, Galva, Geneseo, Germantown Hills, Gilson, Harmon, Henderson, Henry, Hooppole, Hopewell, Joy, Keithsburg, Kewanee, Knoxville, La Fayette, La Moille, La Rose, Lacon, Leonore, London Mills, Lostant, Manlius, Maquon, Matherville, Metamora, Mineral, Neponset, New Bedford, New Boston, North Henderson, Oak Run, Ohio, Oneida, Orion, Peoria, Peoria Heights, Princeville, Rio, Roanoke, Rome, Rutland, Seaton, Sheffield, Sherrard, Sparland, Spring Bay, Sublette, Tiskilwa, Toluca, Toulon, Varna, Victoria, Viola, Walnut, Washburn, Wataga, Wenona, Williamsfield, Windsor, Woodhull, Wyanet, Wyoming, and Yates City. The district had been represented by Republican Chuck Weaver since his appointment in October 2015. Weaver announced on January 9, 2020, he plans to retire from the Illinois Senate at the end of his term. Widmer Fabrics CEO Win Stoller as a result was the sole candidate running for the Republican nomination. Stoller faced no other ballot-listed candidates in the general election.

Republican primary
Party	Candidate	Votes	%
Republican	Win Stoller	12,502	100.0
Total votes		12,502	100.0

General election
Party	Candidate	Votes	%
Republican	Win Stoller	93,569	99.71
Write-in		273	0.29
Total votes		93,842	100.0
Republican hold			

=== District 40 ===
The 40th district, located partly in the Chicago area, includes all or parts of Aroma Park, Beecher, Bonfield, Bourbonnais, Braceville, Bradley, Buckingham, Cabery, Chebanse, Chicago Heights, Coal City, East Brooklyn, Essex, Flossmoor, Frankfort, Gardner, Glenwood, Godley, Hazel Crest, Herscher, Homewood, Hopkins Park, Irwin, Joliet, Kankakee, Limestone, Manhattan, Matteson, Mokena, Momence, Monee, New Lenox, Olympia Fields, Park Forest, Peotone, Reddick, Richton Park, Sammons Point, South Chicago Heights, South Wilmington, St. Anne, Steger, Symerton, Sun River Terrace, Union Hill, University Park, and Wilmington. The district had been represented by Democrat Toi Hutchinson since her appointment on January 5, 2009. Hutchinson vacated her seat in 2019 after being appointed the Illinois Cannabis Regulation Oversight Officer or 'Marijuana Czar.' Patrick Joyce, a local farmer, was appointed to the seat on November 8, 2019. Joyce faced three other candidates for the Democratic nomination: Monica Gordon, executive director of the Illinois Legislative Black Caucus; Marta Perales, Kankakee County Democratic Party communications secretary; and Chicago Heights City Clerk Lori Wilcox. Joyce won the Democratic nomination. Dr. Eric Wallace, an ordained minister and co-founder of Freedom's Journal Institute, was the Republican nominee.

Patrick Joyce

Newspapers

- Chicago Sun-Times

Democratic primary
Party	Candidate	Votes	%
Democratic	Patrick J. Joyce (incumbent)	11,387	46.74
Democratic	Lori Wilcox	6,474	26.57
Democratic	Monica M. Gordon	4,811	19.75
Democratic	Marta Perales	1,692	6.94
Total votes		24,364	100.0

Republican primary
Party	Candidate	Votes	%
Republican	Eric M. Wallace	9,113	100.0
Total votes		9,113	100.0

General election
Party	Candidate	Votes	%
Democratic	Patrick J. Joyce (incumbent)	57,901	58.47
Republican	Eric M. Wallace	41,128	41.53
Total votes		99,029	100.0
Democratic hold			

=== District 43 ===
The 43rd district, located in the Chicago area, covers all or parts of Bolingbrook, Channahon, Crest Hill, Elmwood, Fairmont, Ingalls Park, Joliet, Lemont, Lockport, Naperville, New Lenox, Preston Heights, Rockdale, Romeoville, Shorewood, and Woodridge. The district had been represented by Democrat Pat McGuire since his appointment on February 25, 2012. On September 23, 2019, McGuire announced he would not seek re-election. State Representative John Connor from the 85th district was the Democratic nominee. Ben Bierly, a Marine veteran, was the Republican nominee.

==== Endorsements ====
John Connor

Organizations

- Equality Illinois

Newspapers

- Chicago Sun-Times

==== Results ====
Democratic primary
Party	Candidate	Votes	%
Democratic	John Connor	20,605	100.0
Total votes		20,605	100.0

Republican primary
Party	Candidate	Votes	%
Republican	Ben Bierly	5,856	100.0
Total votes		5,856	100.0

General election
Party	Candidate	Votes	%
Democratic	John Connor	54,584	64.54
Republican	Ben Bierly	29,996	35.46
Total votes		84,580	100.0
Democratic hold			

=== District 46 ===
The 46th district, located in the Peoria metropolitan area, includes all or parts of Banner, Bartonville, Bellevue, Bryant, Canton, Creve Coeur, Cuba, Dunfermline, East Peoria, Fairview, Farmington, Glasford, Hanna City, Kingston Mines, Lake Camelot, Lewistown, Liverpool, Mapleton, Marquette Heights, Morton, Norris, North Pekin, Norwood, Pekin, Peoria, Peoria Heights, South Pekin, St. David, and West Peoria. The district had been represented by Democrat Dave Koehler since December 2006. Tazewell County Treasurer Mary Burress was the Republican nominee.

==== Endorsements ====
Dave Koehler

Organizations

- Equality Illinois

==== Results ====
Democratic primary
Party	Candidate	Votes	%
Democratic	Dave Koehler (incumbent)	17,862	100.0
Total votes		17,862	100.0

Republican primary
Party	Candidate	Votes	%
Republican	Mary Burress	6,717	100.0
Total votes		6,717	100.0

General election
Party	Candidate	Votes	%
Democratic	Dave Koehler (incumbent)	47,492	53.89
Republican	Mary Burress	40,634	46.11
Total votes		88,126	100.0
Democratic hold			

=== District 49 ===
The 49th district, located in the Chicago area, includes all or parts of Aurora, Bolingbrook, Boulder Hill, Channahon, Crest Hill, Crystal Lawns, Joliet, Montgomery, Naperville, Oswego, Plainfield, Romeoville, and Shorewood. The district had been represented by Democrat Jennifer Bertino-Tarrant since January 9, 2013. Bertino-Tarrant announced in 2019 her intention to run for Will County executive, leaving her own state senator seat open. Three candidates ran for the Democratic nomination: Meg Loughran Cappel, a special education teacher; Michael Crowner, an independent consultant; and Larry E. Hug, a licensed independent insurance agent. Cappel won the Democratic nomination. Tom McCullagh, a small business owner, was the Republican nominee.

==== Endorsements ====
Meg Loughran Cappel

Organizations

- SEIU Healthcare

Newspapers

- Chicago Sun-Times

==== Results ====
Democratic primary
Party	Candidate	Votes	%
Democratic	Meg Loughran Cappel	15,159	59.50
Democratic	Larry E. Hug	5,203	20.42
Democratic	Michael Crowner	5,114	20.07
Total votes		25,476	100.0

Republican primary
Party	Candidate	Votes	%
Republican	Thomas McCullagh	9,842	100.0
Total votes		9,842	100.0

General election
Party	Candidate	Votes	%
Democratic	Meg Loughran Cappel	64,276	56.22
Republican	Thomas McCullagh	50,052	43.78
Total votes		114,328	100.0
Democratic hold			

=== District 52 ===
The 52nd district, located in the Champaign-Urbana metropolitan area, including all or parts of Belgium, Catlin, Champaign, Danville, Fithian, Georgetown, Gifford, Indianola, Muncie, Oakwood, Olivet, Penfield, Rantoul, Ridge Farm, Royal, Savoy, Thomasboro, Tilton, Urbana, and Westville. The district had been represented by Democrat Scott M. Bennett since his appointment on January 12, 2015. AJ Ruggieri was the Republican nominee in the general election.

Scott Bennett

Newspapers

- Chicago Tribune

Democratic primary
Party	Candidate	Votes	%
Democratic	Scott Bennett (incumbent)	21,179	100.0
Total votes		21,179	100.0

General election
Party	Candidate	Votes	%
Democratic	Scott Bennett (incumbent)	55,514	63.44
Republican	Alexander (AJ) Ruggieri	31,988	36.56
Total votes		87,502	100.0
Democratic hold			

=== District 55 ===
The 55th district, located partially in the Illinois Wabash Valley, includes all or parts of Albion, Allendale, Annapolis, Ashmore, Bellmont, Bone Gap, Bridgeport, Browns, Burnt Prairie, Calhoun, Carmi, Casey, Charleston, Cisne, Claremont, Clay City, Crossville, Dieterich, Enfield, Fairfield, Flat Rock, Flora, Golden Gate, Grayville, Greenup, Humboldt, Hutsonville, Iola, Jeffersonville, Jewett, Johnsonville, Kansas, Keenes, Keensburg, Lawrenceville, Lerna, Louisville, Marshall, Martinsville, Mattoon, Maunie, Montrose, Mount Carmel, Mount Erie, Neoga, Newtown, Noble, Norris City, Oakland, Oblong, Olney, Palestine, Parkersburg, Phillipstown, Robinson, Rose Hill, Russellville, Sailor Springs, Sims, Springerton, St. Francisville, Ste. Marie, Stoy, Sumner, Teutopolis, Toledo, Watson, Wayne City, West Salem, West Union, West York, Westfield, Wheeler, Willow Hill, Xenia, and Yale. The district had been represented by Republican Dale Righter since January 8, 2003. On May 17, 2019, Righter announced he would not seek re-election. Two candidates ran for the Republican nomination: first-term state representative Darren Bailey from the 109th district and Jeff Fleming, an attorney and co-chair of the Southeastern Illinois Friends of NRA. Bailey won the Republican nomination. Cynthia Given, the Democratic candidate in the 2018 Illinois House of Representatives election in the 109th district, was the Democratic nominee in the general election.

Republican primary
Party	Candidate	Votes	%
Republican	Darren Bailey	24,572	77.04
Republican	Jeffrey E. (Jeff) Fleming	7,324	22.96
Total votes		31,896	100.0

General election
Party	Candidate	Votes	%
Republican	Darren Bailey	78,010	76.68
Democratic	Cynthia Given	23,726	23.32
Total votes		101,736	100.0
Republican hold			

=== District 58 ===
The 58th district, located in parts of the Metro East and Metro Lakeland, includes all or parts of Alto Pass, Anna, Ashley, Ava, Baldwin, Belle Rive, Bluford, Bonnie, Cahokia, Campbell Hill, Carbondale, Centralia, Chester, Cobden, Columbia, Coulterville, Cutler, Darmstadt, De Soto, Dix, Dongola, Du Bois, Du Quoin, Dupo, East Carondelet, Elkville, Ellis Grove, Evansville, Fayetteville, Floraville, Fults, Gorham, Grand Tower, Harrison, Hecker, Ina, Jonesboro, Kaskaskia, Lenzburg, Maeystown, Makanda, Marissa, Mill Creek, Millstadt, Mount Vernon, Murphysboro, Nashville, New Athens, Opdyke, Paderborn, Percy, Pinckneyville, Prairie du Rocher, Radom, Red Bud, Richview, Rockwood, Ruma, Sauget, Smithton, Sparta, St. Johns, St. Libory, Steeleville, Tamaroa, Tilden, Valmeyer, Vergennes, Waltonville, Waterloo, Willisville, and Woodlawn. The district had been represented by Republican Paul Schimpf since January 11, 2017. Schimpf announced in 2019 that he would not seek re-election. State Representative Terri Bryant from the 115th district was the Republican nominee. After winning the Republican nomination, Bryant faced no other ballot-listed candidates in the general election.

Republican primary
Party	Candidate	Votes	%
Republican	Terri Bryant	15,628	100.0
Total votes		15,628	100.0

General election
Party	Candidate	Votes	%
Republican	Terri Bryant	85,257	100.0
Total votes		85,257	100.0
Republican hold			
