= 2024 Illinois Senate election =

2024 Illinois Senate elections
- November 5, 2024

23 of 59 seats in the Illinois Senate 30 seats needed for a majority
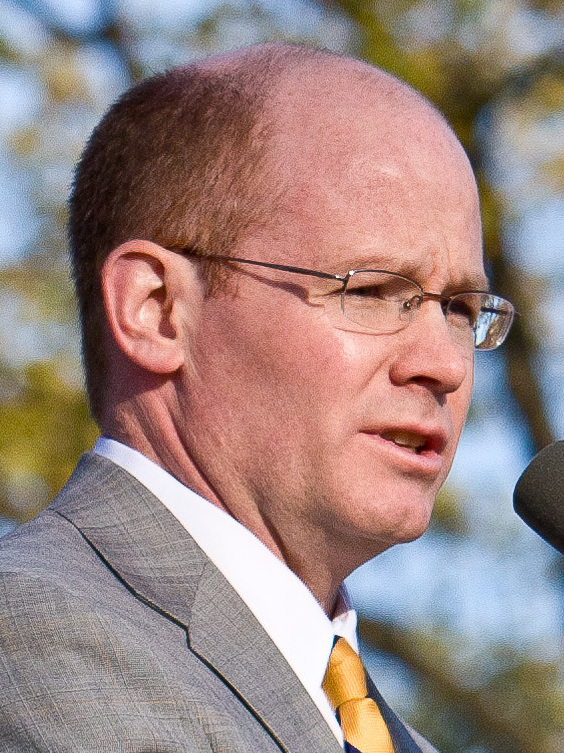

	Majority party	Minority party
Leader	Don Harmon	John Curran
Party	Democratic	Republican
Leader's seat	39th district	41st district
Last election	40, 51.79%	19, 48.19%
Seats won	40	19
Seat change	Steady	Steady
Popular vote	1,124,829	813,476
Percentage	58.03%	41.97%
Swing	▲6.24%	▼6.22%
- Democratic hold Republican hold No election 50–60% 60–70% 70–80% 80–90% >90% 50–60% 60–70% >90%
Senate President before election
Don Harmon
Democratic
Elected Senate President
Don Harmon
Democratic

The 2024 elections for the Illinois Senate were held on Tuesday, November 5, 2024. The general primary election for established political parties was held on March 19, 2024.

Elections were held for 23 out of 59 seats in the Illinois Senate.

No seats were changed in this election.

== Retirements ==
Two incumbents did not seek re-election.

=== Republicans ===
Two Republicans did not seek re-election.

1. District 37: Win Stoller retired.
2. District 53: Thomas M. Bennett retired.

== Incumbents defeated ==
=== In primary election ===
Once incumbent senator, a Democrat, was defeated in the March 19 primary election.

==== Democrats ====
1. District 20: Natalie Toro lost nomination to a full term to Graciela Guzmán.

== Predictions ==
Source	Ranking	As of
Sabato's Crystal Ball	Safe D	October 23, 2024

== Summary of results by district ==
Italics denote an open seat held by the incumbent party; bold text denotes a gain for a party.

- Districts that did not hold elections in 2024 are not listed below.

State Senate District	Incumbent	Party	Elected Senator	Outcome
1	Javier Loera Cervantes	Dem	Javier Loera Cervantes	Dem Hold
4	Kimberly A. Lightford	Dem	Kimberly A. Lightford	Dem Hold
5 (Note: The election in this district was a special election to fill the remaining two years of an unexpired term.)	Lakesia Collins	Dem	Lakesia Collins	Dem Hold
7	Mike Simmons	Dem	Mike Simmons	Dem Hold
10	Robert Martwick	Dem	Robert Martwick	Dem Hold
13	Robert Peters	Dem	Robert Peters	Dem Hold
16	Willie Preston	Dem	Willie Preston	Dem Hold
19	Michael Hastings	Dem	Michael Hastings	Dem Hold
20	Natalie Toro	Dem	Graciela Guzmán	Dem Hold
22	Cristina Castro	Dem	Cristina Castro	Dem Hold
25	Karina Villa	Dem	Karina Villa	Dem Hold
27	Mark L. Walker	Dem	Mark L. Walker	Dem Hold
28	Laura Murphy	Dem	Laura Murphy	Dem Hold
31	Mary Edly-Allen	Dem	Mary Edly-Allen	Dem Hold
34	Steve Stadelman	Dem	Steve Stadelman	Dem Hold
37	Win Stoller	Rep	Li Arellano Jr.	Rep Hold
40	Patrick Joyce	Dem	Patrick Joyce	Dem Hold
43	Rachel Ventura	Dem	Rachel Ventura	Dem Hold
46	Dave Koehler	Dem	Dave Koehler	Dem Hold
49	Meg Loughran Cappel	Dem	Meg Loughran Cappel	Dem Hold
52	Paul Faraci	Dem	Paul Faraci	Dem Hold
53	Thomas M. Bennett	Rep	Chris Balkema	Rep Hold
55	Jason Plummer	Rep	Jason Plummer	Rep Hold
58	Terri Bryant	Rep	Terri Bryant	Rep Hold

== Elections by district ==
=== District 1 ===
Democrat Javier Cervantes was elected to the Illinois Senate unopposed in the 2022 general election. He was appointed to the Senate on November 18, 2022, to serve during veto session of the 102nd General Assembly. No Republican candidate has filed to run against him in 2024.

1st District Democratic primary details

Democratic primary results
Party	Candidate	Votes	%
Democratic	Javier Cervantes (incumbent)	10,213	100.0
Total votes		10,213	100.0

2024 Illinois Senate election, 1st District
Party	Candidate	Votes	%
Democratic	Javier Cervantes (Incumbent)	43,813	100.0
Democratic hold			

=== District 4 ===
Democrat Kimberly Lightford was reelected to the Illinois Senate unopposed in the 2022 general election. She is running for re-election against Republican Robert Sumrell Jr.

4th District Democratic primary details

Democratic primary results
Party	Candidate	Votes	%
Democratic	Kimberly Lightford (incumbent)	20,222	100.0
Total votes		20,222	100.0

4th District Republican primary details

Republican primary results
Party	Candidate	Votes	%
Republican	Robert Sumrell Jr.	2,650	100.0
Total votes		2,650	100.0

2024 Illinois' 4th legislative district election results
Party	Candidate	Votes	%
Democratic	Kimberly Lightford (incumbent)		
Republican	Robert Sumrell Jr.		
Total votes			

2024 Illinois Senate election, 4th District
Party	Candidate	Votes	%
Democratic	Kimberley A. Lightford (Incumbent)	65,312	76.4
Republican	Robert Sumrell Jr.	20,177	23.6
Total votes		85,489	100.0
Democratic hold			

=== District 5 ===
Democrat Lakesia Collins was appointed to the Illinois Senate on August 15, 2023. There will be an election for the remaining two years of the term. No Republican candidate has filed to run against her in 2024.

5th District Democratic primary details

Democratic primary results
Party	Candidate	Votes	%
Democratic	Lakesia Collins (incumbent)	17,088	100.0
Total votes		17,088	100.0

2024 Illinois Senate election, 5th District
Party	Candidate	Votes	%
Democratic	Lakesia Collins (Incumbent)	63,423	100.0
Democratic hold			

=== District 7 ===
The 7th district includes various neighborhoods on the north side of Chicago. Democrat Mike Simmons was elected to the Illinois Senate unopposed in the 2022 general election. He is running for reelection in 2024, once again unopposed.

7th District Democratic primary details

Democratic primary results
Party	Candidate	Votes	%
Democratic	Mike Simmons (incumbent)	33,266	100.0
Total votes		33,266	100.0

2024 Illinois Senate election, 7th District
Party	Candidate	Votes	%
Democratic	Mike Simmons (Incumbent)	84,513	100.0
Democratic hold			

=== District 10 ===
The 10th district includes various neighborhoods on the northwest side of Chicago and surrounding suburbs. Democrat Robert Martwick was reelected to the Illinois Senate against nominal, write-in opposition in the 2022 general election. He is seeking reelection against Republican Jon Luers.

10th District Democratic primary details

Democratic primary results
Party	Candidate	Votes	%
Democratic	Robert Martwick (incumbent)	20,447	100.0
Total votes		20,447	100.0

10th District Republican primary details

Republican primary results
Party	Candidate	Votes	%
Republican	Jon Luers	6,221	100.0
Total votes		6,221	100.0

2024 Illinois Senate election, 10th District
Party	Candidate	Votes	%
Democratic	Robert Martwick (Incumbent)	54,001	60.92
Republican	Jon Luers	34,635	39.08
Total votes		88,636	100.0
Democratic hold			

=== District 13 ===
The 13th district stretches from downtown Chicago to the city's south side. Democrat Robert Peters was elected to the Illinois Senate unopposed in the 2022 general election. He is running unopposed again in 2024.

13th District Democratic primary details

Democratic primary results
Party	Candidate	Votes	%
Democratic	Robert Peters (incumbent)	22,553	100.0
Total votes		22,553	100.0

2024 Illinois Senate election, 10th District
Party	Candidate	Votes	%
Democratic	Robert Peters (Incumbent)	64,018	100.00
Democratic hold			

=== District 16 ===
Democrat Willie Preston was elected to the Illinois Senate unopposed in the 2022 general election. He is running unopposed again in 2024.

16th District Democratic primary details

Democratic primary results
Party	Candidate	Votes	%
Democratic	Willie Preston (incumbent)	17,011	100.0
Total votes		17,011	100.0

2024 Illinois Senate election, 16th District
Party	Candidate	Votes	%
Democratic	Willie Preston (Incumbent)	53,401	100.00
Democratic hold			

=== District 19 ===
Democrat Michael Hastings was reelected to the Illinois Senate in the 2022 general election with 50.59% of the vote. He is running for reelection against Republican Samantha Jean Gasca, who won the nomination in a three-way race.

19th District Democratic primary details

Democratic primary results
Party	Candidate	Votes	%
Democratic	Michael Hastings (incumbent)	16,571	100.0
Total votes		16,571	100.0

19th District Republican primary details

Republican primary results
Party	Candidate	Votes	%
Republican	Samantha Jean Gasca	3,670	36.83
Republican	Hillary Mattsey Kurzawa	3,391	34.03
Republican	Max Solomon	2,904	29.14
Total votes		9,965	100.0

2024 Illinois Senate election, 19th District
Party	Candidate	Votes	%
Democratic	Michael Hastings (Incumbent)	62,942	56.35
Republican	Samantha Jean Gasca	48,755	43.65
Total votes		111,697	100.0
Democratic hold			

=== District 20 ===
Democrat Natalie Toro was appointed to the Illinois Senate on July 10, 2023, after Cristina Pacione-Zayas resigned to join the Johnson administration. As the vacancy was filled with greater than 28 months remaining in the term, state statute requires an election be held.

Toro was defeated by Graciela Guzmán in the Democratic primary. Guzmán will face off against Republican Jason Proctor in the general election.

20th District Democratic primary details

Democratic primary results
Party	Candidate	Votes	%
Democratic	Graciela Guzmán	13,521	51.32
Democratic	Natalie Toro (incumbent)	7,701	29.23
Democratic	Dave Nayak	3,973	15.08
Democratic	Geary Yonker	1,153	4.38
Total votes		26,348	100.0

20th District Republican primary details

Republican primary results
Party	Candidate	Votes	%
Republican	Jason Proctor	1,924	100.0
Total votes		1,924	100.0

2024 Illinois Senate election, 20th District
Party	Candidate	Votes	%
Democratic	Graciela Guzmán	61,803	81.23
Republican	Jason Proctor	14,281	18.77
Total votes		76,084	100.0
Democratic hold			

=== District 22 ===
Democrat Cristina Castro was elected to the Illinois Senate unopposed in the 2022 general election. She is running for reelection unopposed.

22nd District Democratic primary details

Democratic primary results
Party	Candidate	Votes	%
Democratic	Cristina Castro (incumbent)	7,633	100.0
Total votes		7,633	100.0

2024 Illinois Senate election, 22nd District
Party	Candidate	Votes	%
Democratic	Cristina Castro (incumbent)	47,763	100.00
Democratic hold			

=== District 25 ===
Democrat Karina Villa was reelected to the Illinois Senate in the 2022 general election with 58.72% of the vote. She is running for reelection against Republican Heather Brown.

25th District Democratic primary details

Democratic primary results
Party	Candidate	Votes	%
Democratic	Karina Villa (incumbent)	8,894	100.0
Total votes		8,894	100.0

25th District Republican primary details

Republican primary results
Party	Candidate	Votes	%
Republican	Heather Brown	6,047	100.0
Total votes		6,047	100.0

2024 Illinois Senate election, 25th District
Party	Candidate	Votes	%
Democratic	Karina Villa (Incumbent)	46,205	58.94
Republican	Heather Brown	32,183	41.06
Total votes		78,388	100.0
Democratic hold			

=== District 27 ===
2024 Illinois Senate election, 27th District
Party	Candidate	Votes	%
Democratic	Mark L. Walker	53,917	57.55
Republican	Tom Schlenhardt	39,769	42.45
Total votes		93,686	100.0
Democratic hold			

=== District 28 ===
Democrat Laura Murphy was reelected to the Illinois Senate in the 2022 general election with 58.72% of the vote. She is running for reelection unopposed.

28th District Democratic primary details

Democratic primary results
Party	Candidate	Votes	%
Democratic	Laura Murphy (incumbent)	12,416	100.0
Total votes		12,416	100.0

2024 Illinois Senate election, 28th District
Party	Candidate	Votes	%
Democratic	Laura Murphy (incumbent)	57,919	100.00
Democratic hold			

=== District 31 ===
Democrat Mary Edly-Allen was elected to the Illinois Senate in the 2022 general election with 58.72% of the vote. She is running for reelection unopposed.

31st District Democratic primary details

Democratic primary results
Party	Candidate	Votes	%
Democratic	Mary Edly-Allen (incumbent)	8,511	100.0
Total votes		8,511	100.0

2024 Illinois Senate election, 31st District
Party	Candidate	Votes	%
Democratic	Mary Edly-Allen (incumbent)	52,654	58.16
Republican	Ashley Jensen	37,880	41.84
Total votes		90,534	100.0
Democratic hold			

=== District 34 ===
Democrat Steve Stadelman was reelected to the Illinois Senate in the 2022 general election with 58.59% of the vote. He is running for reelection against Republican Crystal Villarreal Soltow.

34th District Democratic primary details

Democratic primary results
Party	Candidate	Votes	%
Democratic	Steve Stadelman (incumbent)	7,713	100.0
Total votes		7,713	100.0

34th District Republican primary details

Republican primary results
Party	Candidate	Votes	%
Republican	Crystal Villarreal Soltow	6,873	100.0
Total votes		6,873	100.0

2024 Illinois Senate election, 34th District
Party	Candidate	Votes	%
Democratic	Steve Stadelman (incumbent)	49,576	62.11
Republican	Crystal Villarreal Soltow	30,238	37.89
Total votes		79,814	100.0
Democratic hold			

=== District 37 ===
The 37th district includes all or parts of Lee, Bureau, Henry, DeKalb, Ogle, Rock Island, Whiteside, Stark, Peoria, Woodford and Marshall counties. Republican Win Stoller was elected to the Illinois Senate unopposed in the 2022 general election. Stoller is not running for reelection. In the Republican primary, Chris Bishop, a member of the Dixon City Council, former Mayor of Dixon Li Arellano Jr, and Henry County Board member Tim Yager ran to replace him. Li Arellano Jr. won the primary and is unopposed in the general election.

Former state legislator Tom Demmer declined to be a candidate.

37th District Republican primary details

Republican primary results
Party	Candidate	Votes	%
Republican	Li Arellano Jr.	9,394	48.45
Republican	Tim Yager	7,078	36.5
Republican	Chris Bishop	2,918	15.05
Total votes		19,390	100.0

2024 Illinois Senate election, 37th District
Party	Candidate	Votes	%
Republican	Li Arellano Jr.	86,286	100.00
Republican hold			

=== District 40 ===
The 40th district includes the parts of the Chicago Southland in Cook and Will counties and parts of Kankakee County. Democrat Patrick Joyce was reelected to the Illinois Senate in the 2022 general election with 55.34% of the vote.

40th District Democratic primary details

Joyce was challenged by Democrat Kimberly Earling in the Democratic primary and will face off against Philip Nagel, the 2022 Republican nominee for the seat, in the general election.

Democratic primary results
Party	Candidate	Votes	%
Democratic	Patrick Joyce (incumbent)	8,604	78.69
Democratic	Kimberly Earling	2,330	21.31
Total votes		10,934	100.0

40th District Republican primary details

Republican primary results
Party	Candidate	Votes	%
Republican	Philip Nagel	7,971	100.0
Total votes		7,971	100.0

2024 Illinois Senate election, 40th District
Party	Candidate	Votes	%
Democratic	Patrick Joyce (incumbent)	51,942	56.40
Republican	Philip Nagel	40,153	43.60
Total votes		92,095	100.0
Democratic hold			

=== District 43 ===
Democrat Rachel Ventura was elected to the Illinois Senate in the 2022 general election with 56.05% of the vote. She is running for reelection against Republican Jennifer "Jen" Monson.

43rd District Democratic primary details

Democratic primary results
Party	Candidate	Votes	%
Democratic	Rachel Ventura (incumbent)	10,347	100.0
Total votes		10,347	100.0

43rd District Republican primary details

Republican primary results
Party	Candidate	Votes	%
Republican	Jennifer "Jen" Monson	7,210	100.0
Total votes		7,210	100.0

2024 Illinois Senate election, 43rd District
Party	Candidate	Votes	%
Democratic	Rachel Ventura (incumbent)	49,057	58.18
Republican	Jennifer “Jen” Monson	35,266	41.82
Total votes		84,323	100.0
Democratic hold			

=== District 46 ===
The 46th district is located in Central Illinois and includes portions of Peoria and Bloomington-Normal. Democrat Dave Koehler was elected to the Illinois Senate in the 2022 general election with 58.07% of the vote. Koehler is running for reelection against Republican Sally Owens.

46th District Democratic primary details

Democratic primary results
Party	Candidate	Votes	%
Democratic	Dave Koehler (incumbent)	9,139	100.0
Total votes		9,139	100.0

46th District Republican primary details

Republican primary results
Party	Candidate	Votes	%
Republican	Sally Owens	7,483	100.0
Total votes		7,483	100.0

2024 Illinois Senate election, 46th District
Party	Candidate	Votes	%
Democratic	Dave Koehler (incumbent)	53,156	57.58
Republican	Sally Owens	39,168	42.42
Total votes		92,324	100.0
Democratic hold			

=== District 49 ===
Democrat Meg Loughran Cappel was elected to the Illinois Senate unopposed in the 2022 general election. She is being challenged for reelection by Republican Katie Deane-Schlottman.

49th District Democratic primary details

Democratic primary results
Party	Candidate	Votes	%
Democratic	Meg Loughran Cappel (incumbent)	9,360	100.0
Total votes		9,360	100.0

49th District Republican primary details

Republican primary results
Party	Candidate	Votes	%
Republican	Katie Deane-Schlottman	7,204	100.0
Total votes		7,204	100.0

2024 Illinois Senate election, 49th District
Party	Candidate	Votes	%
Democratic	Meg Loughran Cappel (incumbent)	55,505	56.04
Republican	Katie Deane-Schlottman	43,537	43.96
Total votes		99,042	100.0
Democratic hold			

=== District 52 ===
The 52nd district, located in east-central Illinois, includes Champaign, Danville, Rantoul, St. Joseph, and Urbana.

After successfully seeking reelection to the 103rd General Assembly, Scott M. Bennett died prior to inauguration. Then-Champaign Township Assessor Paul Faraci was appointed to the Illinois Senate and sworn into office on January 11, 2023. Faraci is running for reelection against Republican Jeff Brownfield.

State Representative Carol Ammons, after seeking appointment to the seat following Bennett's death and exploring a primary run for the Democratic nomination against Faraci, opted instead to run for reelection to the Illinois House of Representatives.

52nd District Republican primary details

Democratic primary results
Party	Candidate	Votes	%
Democratic	Paul Faraci (incumbent)	9,639	100.0
Total votes		9,639	100.0

52nd District Democratic primary details

Republican primary results
Party	Candidate	Votes	%
Republican	Jeff Brownfield	6,107	100.0
Total votes		6,107	100.0

2024 Illinois Senate election, 52nd District
Party	Candidate	Votes	%
Democratic	Paul Faraci (incumbent)	53,909	63.19
Republican	Jeff Brownfield	31,405	36.81
Total votes		85,314	100.0
Democratic hold			

=== District 53 ===
The 53rd district includes all or portions of Bureau, Ford, Grundy, Iroquois, LaSalle, Marshall, McLean, Peoria, Putnam, Tazewell, Will, and Woodford counties in central Illinois. Republican Jason Barickman was reelected to the Illinois Senate unopposed in the 2022 general election. After Barickman declined to take office for the 103rd General Assembly, Republican Tom Bennett was appointed to the Illinois Senate to fill the vacancy. As the vacancy was filled with greater than 28 months remaining in the term, state statute requires an election be held. Bennett is not seeking reelection.

Chris Balkema, Chair of the Grundy County Board, Susan Wynn Bence, Bennett's chief of staff, Mike Kirkton, a member of the Livingston County Board, and Jesse Faber were candidates for the Republican nomination. Gary Manier, the Mayor of Washington, and several others announced their respective candidacies, but did not file petitions by the deadline to run in the Republican primary. Kirkton's petitions were challenged for insufficient signatures, but he remained on the primary ballot.

53rd District Republican primary details
Chris Balkema won the primary and is unopposed in the general election.

Republican primary results
Party	Candidate	Votes	%
Republican	Chris Balkema	11,788	49.44
Republican	Jesse Faber	7,588	31.83
Republican	Mike Kirkton	2,587	10.85
Republican	Susan Wynn Bence	1,879	7.88
Total votes		23,842	100.0

2024 Illinois Senate election, 53rd District
Party	Candidate	Votes	%
Republican	Chris Balkema	90,825	100.00
Republican hold			

=== District 55 ===
The 55th district, located in downstate Illinois, includes all or parts of Richland, Clay, Fayette, Marion, Clinton, Madison, and St. Clair counties. Republican Jason Plummer was reelected to the Illinois Senate unopposed in the 2022 general election. He is running for reelection unopposed.

55th District Republican primary details

Republican primary results
Party	Candidate	Votes	%
Republican	Jason Plummer (incumbent)	22,703	100.0
Total votes		22,703	100.0

2024 Illinois Senate election, 55th District
Party	Candidate	Votes	%
Republican	Jason Plummer (incumbent)	95,805	100.00
Republican hold			

=== District 58 ===
Republican Terri Bryant was reelected to the Illinois Senate unopposed in the 2022 general election. Bryant is running for reelection and was challenged by Wesley Kash, a former Assistant State's Attorney in Jefferson County, in the Republican primary. Bryant is unopposed in the general election.

58th District Republican primary details

Republican primary results
Party	Candidate	Votes	%
Republican	Terri Bryant (incumbent)	19,982	69.66
Republican	Wesley Kash	8,702	30.34
Total votes		28,684	100.0

2024 Illinois Senate election, 58th District
Party	Candidate	Votes	%
Republican	Terri Bryant (incumbent)	93,113	100.00
Republican hold			

== See also ==
- List of Illinois state legislatures
