= 2020 Will County Executive election =

- November 3, 2020

Nominee	Jennifer Bertino-Tarrant	Laurie McPhillips
Party	Democratic	Republican
Popular vote	153,735	134,059
Percentage	53.42%	46.58%
- Results: Bertino-Tarrant: 50–60% 60–70% 70–80% 80–90% >90% McPhillips: 50–60% 60–70% 70–80%
County Executive before election
Denise Winfrey (acting)
Democratic
Elected County Executive
Jennifer Bertino-Tarrant
Democratic

The 2020 Will County Executive election was held on November 3, 2020. Incumbent Democratic County Executive Larry Walsh declined to run for re-election to a fifth term, citing health issues. Walsh died on June 3, 2020, and County Board Speaker Denise Winfrey was appointed to serve out the remainder of his term.

State Senator Jennifer Bertino-Tarrant ran to succeed Walsh, and faced Nick Palmer, Walsh's chief of staff, in the Democratic primary. Bertino-Tarrant defeated Palmer by a wide margin, winning 69 percent of the vote, and advanced to the general election, where she was opposed by Republican Nick Ficarello, the former Braidwood Police Chief. Bertino-Tarrant defeated Ficarello with 54 percent of the vote.

== Democratic primary ==
=== Candidates ===
- Jennifer Bertino-Tarrant, State Senator
- Nick Palmer, Chief of Staff to County Executive Larry Walsh

=== Primary results ===
Democratic primary results
Party	Candidate	Votes	%
Democratic	Jennifer Bertino-Tarrant	51,396	68.92%
Democratic	Nick Palmer	23,173	31.08%
Total votes		74,569	100.00%

== Republican primary ==
=== Candidates ===
- Nick Ficarello, former Braidwood Police Chief

=== Primary results ===
Republican primary results
Party	Candidate	Votes	%
Republican	Nick Ficarello	27,666	99.25%
Republican	Write-ins	208	0.75%
Total votes		27,874	100.00%

== General election ==
=== Results ===
2020 Will County Executive election
Party	Candidate	Votes	%
Democratic	Jennifer Bertino-Tarrant	182,132	54.32%
Republican	Nick Ficarello	153,149	45.68%
Total votes		335,281	100.00%
Democratic hold			
