= Cristina Castro =

Cristinia Castro may refer to:

- Cristina Castro (sprinter) (born 1969), Spanish sprinter who took part in the 1992 Summer Olympics
- Cristina Castro (politician), American politician, member of the Illinois Senate who took office in January 2017

== See also ==
- Cristian Castro (born 1974), Mexican pop singer
