= Mike Simmons =

American politician

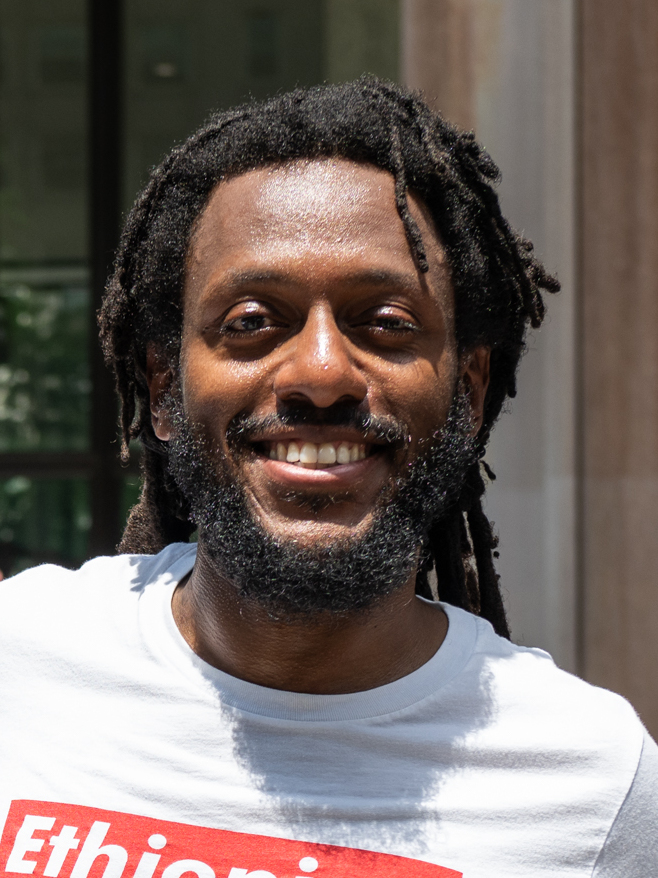
- Simmons in 2025

Member of the Illinois Senate from the 7th district
- Incumbent
- Assumed office February 6, 2021
- Preceded by: Heather Steans

Personal details
- Born: 1983 (age 42–43) Chicago, Illinois, U.S.
- Party: Democratic
- Education: Amherst College (BA)

Michael Simmons (born 1983) is an American politician serving as a Democratic member of the Illinois Senate from the 7th district, which includes the Chicago neighborhoods of Rogers Park, Edgewater, Andersonville, Uptown, and Lincoln Square. He was appointed to the office in February 2021, and was re-elected in 2022 and 2024, running unopposed both times. Simmons ran in the 2026 Democratic primary election for Illinois's 9th congressional district, placing fourth.

== Early life and education ==
Simmons was born in Chicago to an African American mother and an Ethiopian father who came to the United States as a refugee. He was raised in public housing in the Lincoln Square neighborhood. He earned a Bachelor of Arts degree in political science from Amherst College.

== Early political career ==
As an undergraduate student, Simmons worked as an intern in the United States Senate office of Barack Obama. From 2007 to 2009, he worked as a staff assistant and legislative correspondent in the office of Senator Dick Durbin. From 2009 to 2011, he was the policy director for Cook County Commissioner Bridget Gainer. He served as policy director for Chicago Mayor Rahm Emanuel from 2011 to 2013 and as deputy commissioner of the Chicago Department of Planning and Development from 2013 to 2016. After leaving the city government in 2016, Simmons spent a year traveling in West Africa and the Balkans. In 2017, he founded Blue Sky Strategies, a public policy and consulting firm focused on "equitable urban planning and anti-racism in public policy." In June 2020, Simmons became deputy director of My Brother's Keeper Alliance, an initiative managed by the Obama Foundation.

== Illinois Senate ==
=== Appointment and elections ===
On February 6, 2021, Simmons was appointed to the Illinois Senate, succeeding retiring incumbent Heather Steans. The appointment was made by elected committeepeople of the Cook County Democratic Party representing the wards and townships covered by the 7th district. State Representative Kelly Cassidy was reported as the frontrunner for the appointment soon after Steans announced her retirement. However, Simmons secured the position after earning the support of 48th ward alderman Harry Osterman (who held the largest weighted share of the votes in the appointment process) and three other committeepeople. He is the first Ethiopian American and openly gay member of the Illinois State Senate.

Simmons won re-election to the seat in the 2022 and 2024 elections, running unopposed both times.

=== Tenure ===
In 2021, Simmons introduced a bill to address hair discrimination in schools that would prohibit schools from applying uniform or dress code policies to hairstyles, with the goal of prohibiting discrimination faced especially by African American students for traditional hairstyles such as dreadlocks, cornrows, and braids. The bill was named the Jett Hawkins Act, after a 4-year-old child who was told to remove his braids by school administrators. The bill was passed later that year and signed into law by Governor JB Pritzker at Uplift Community High School, located in Simmons' district.

Since 2021, Simmons has advocated for a permanent state-level child tax credit. In 2023, he sponsored a bill that would provide a credit of $700 per child under age 17. He pointed to the impact of the federal American Rescue Plan Act's temporary child tax credit expansion on reducing child poverty, and argued that Illinois could continue those reductions through a permanent state version. Governor Pritzker's budget proposal in 2024 allocated $12 million for a more modest child tax credit applying to children under age 3. The final budget passed by the General Assembly allocated $150 million for a credit of up to $300 per child under age 12.

In 2023, as part of the budget for the next fiscal year, Simmons secured $2.5 million in funding for $10,000 micro-grants for small businesses facing financial hardships in the 7th district. The grants were allocated to 225 small businesses in 2024.

Simmons has advocated for public transit improvements and access in Chicago. In 2023, he was the chief sponsor of enacted legislation to accelerate the adoption of electric buses and offer reduced fares for survivors of domestic violence and participants in youth jobs programs. In 2024, after the announcement of plans for overhauling the northernmost part of Lake Shore Drive, he criticized the plan for being "incremental" in its changes to facilitate express bus travel. In 2025, he sponsored a bill to provide free transit for low-income individuals. During the debate over the "fiscal cliff" facing the Regional Transportation Authority in 2025, he supported a proposal to create an integrated regional transit system.

Simmons supports transgender rights and supports providing gender affirming care to youth that identify as transgender. He introduced the Gender Affirming Healthcare Protection Act on November 22, 2022.

Simmons supports gun control and describes himself as aggressively supporting gun control legislation, and says that he strongly supports a ban on assault weapons and high-capacity magazines at the state and federal level.

=== Committees ===
In the 2023-24 term, Simmons chaired the Senate's Committee on Human Rights. In the 2025-26 term, Simmons is the chair of the Committee on Public Health. Since the beginning of his tenure in 2023, he has also been a member of the committees on Behavioral and Mental Health and Transportation.

== 2026 congressional candidacy ==
On July 8, 2025, Simmons announced his candidacy in the 2026 Democratic primary election for Illinois' 9th congressional district, to replace retiring incumbent Jan Schakowsky. Daniel Biss won the primary election, securing 29.6% of the vote in the field of 15 candidates.

== Electoral results ==
2026 U.S. House of Representatives, Illinois's 9th Congressional District - Democratic primary results
Party	Candidate	Votes	%
Democratic	Daniel Biss	36,781	29.6
Democratic	Kat Abughazaleh	32,271	25.9
Democratic	Laura Fine	25,326	20.3
Democratic	Mike Simmons	8,647	7.0
Democratic	Phil Andrew	7,709	6.2
Democratic	Bushra Amiwala	6,240	5.0
Democratic	Hoan Huynh	2,174	1.8
Democratic	Patricia Brown	1,600	1.3
Democratic	Jeff Cohen	1,041	0.8
Democratic	Justin Ford	748	0.6
Democratic	Bethany Johnson	613	0.5
Democratic	Sam Polan	508	0.4
Democratic	Howard Rosenblum	296	0.2
Democratic	Nick Pyati	227	0.2
Democratic	Mark Fredrickson	213	0.2
Total votes		124,201	100.0
