= Travis Weaver =

American politician in Illinois

Member of the Illinois House of Representatives from the 93rd district
- Incumbent
- Assumed office January 11, 2023
- Preceded by: Norine Hammond

Personal details
- Born: June 18, 1992 (age 34)
- Party: Republican
- Spouse: MacKinsey (Manning) Weaver
- Education: University of Alabama; Northwestern University

Travis Robert Weaver (born June 18, 1992) is an American politician who has served in the Illinois House of Representatives for the 93rd district since 2023.

== Career ==
Weaver worked in various roles at Caterpillar from 2015 until 2022, ending his career as a strategy manager. Weaver remains active in business as an investor in start up businesses and a business professor at Bradley University and the University of Illinois-Springfield.

== Legislative career ==
As of 2024, Weaver is a member of the following Illinois House committees:

- Appropriations-Public Safety (HAPP)
- Energy & Environment (HENG)
- Housing (SHOU)
- Immigration & Human Rights (SIHR)
- Personnel & Pensions (HPPN)
- Revenue & Finance (HREF)
- Tax Credit and Incentives Subcommitee (HREF-HTCI)
- Insurance (HINS)
- Public Utilities (HPUB)

== Personal life ==
Weaver is the son of former Republican state senator Chuck Weaver and Impact Central Illinois founder Laurie Weaver. Weaver was born in Peoria County, grew up in Peoria, Illinois, and graduated from Dunlap High School. He received a BA in Finance and Marketing from the University of Alabama and an MBA from Northwestern University.
