= Robert Peters (Illinois politician) =

American politician (born 1985)

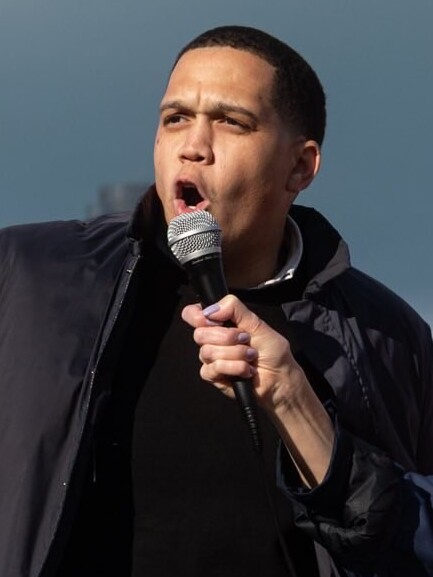

Member of the Illinois Senate from the 13th district
- Incumbent
- Assumed office January 6, 2019
- Preceded by: Kwame Raoul

Personal details
- Born: April 26, 1985 (age 41) Chicago, Illinois, U.S.
- Party: Democratic
- Education: Kansas State University (BA)

Robert J. Peters (born April 26, 1985) is an American politician serving as a Democratic member of the Illinois Senate for the 13th district. The Chicago-based district, once represented by President Barack Obama, includes all or parts of East Side, Hyde Park, Kenwood, South Chicago, South Shore, and Woodlawn. Peters took office on January 6, 2019, after being appointed to succeed Kwame Raoul. He has since been elected in 2020 and again in 2024.

He served as the Senate Chair of the Illinois Legislative Black Caucus from 2021 to 2024 and has been the Majority Whip for the Senate Democratic Caucus since 2025.

== Early life and career ==
Peters was born in Chicago, Illinois on April 26, 1985. His biological mother suffered from drug and alcohol addiction. He was raised by his adoptive parents, Thomas and Cynthia (nee' Mikolas) Peters. His father worked as a civil rights lawyer and argued a few cases before the U.S. Supreme Court. His mother worked as a social worker. Although he was born deaf and with a speech impediment, he regained full hearing ability at age 8 and full speech capability at age 12. He attended Kansas State University from 2004 to 2009. Peters is Black and Jewish. He was devastated when his adoptive parents died, his father in 2011 and his mother in 2013.

His initial engagement in electoral politics was during Toni Preckwinkle's successful campaign for Cook County Board President in 2010. He later worked for Groupon, before returning to politics as an organizer for the non-profit Chicago Votes.

Prior to his appointment, Peters was the political director for the People's Lobby and their PAC, Reclaim Chicago. The People's Lobby endorsed and mobilized on behalf of candidates including Kim Foxx in the 2016 Cook County State's Attorney election and Bernie Sanders in the 2016 Democratic presidential primary. He also previously worked for the Illinois Coalition for Immigrant and Refugee Rights, and served as the political director for Daniel Biss' campaign for Governor of Illinois in 2018. He is a member of both the People's Lobby and United Working Families.

== Illinois State Senator (2019–present) ==
=== Appointment and elections ===
Peters was appointed to the Illinois Senate to represent the 13th district in January 2019, to replace outgoing Senator Kwame Raoul upon the latter's election as Attorney General of Illinois. Under Cook County's appointment process, the Democratic Party committeepeople in the area of the district received weighted votes in choosing Raoul's replacement; in this case, the largest weighted votes were held by alderman Leslie Hairston and Cook County Board President Toni Preckwinkle. Upon his appointment, Peters signaled his commitment to continuing Raoul's emphasis on issues of bail reform and marijuana legalization.

He successfully ran for election in 2020, winning 53% of the vote in the Democratic primary election against Ken Thomas and winning the general election uncontested. In the primary election, both candidates agreed on most issues but Thomas charged that Peters was appointed through a "backroom deal." Peters was endorsed by a number of progressive organizations including United Working Families, Equality Illinois, and Reclaim Chicago, and most of his campaign contributions came from labor unions.

He was re-elected in 2024, running uncontested in both the Democratic primary and the general election.

=== Tenure ===
During the 2019–20 term, Peters was the chief co-sponsor of 13 bills that were signed into law, including legislation on banning private civil detention centers, ending "pay to stay" practices in correctional facilities, and expanding access to SNAP benefits, preventive HIV treatment, and apprenticeships for youth. He has cited improving the Department of Children and Family Services as a top legislative priority, and three of his co-sponsored bills focused on this agency, requiring expansion of post-adoption support services, collection of feedback from youth transitioning out of foster care, and provision of preventive care to reduce homelessness, incarceration, and unemployment.

Criminal justice reform has been one of Peters' main priorities in the State Senate. In 2020, along with Rep. Justin Slaughter, he introduced a bill called the Pretrial Fairness Act to end the use of cash bail in Illinois. In 2021, an amended version of this bill was enacted as part of the SAFE-T Act, making Illinois the first state to eliminate cash bail. Peters was also a co-sponsor of the broader SAFE-T Act, which included various reforms on police training and use of force, sentencing, and services for crime victims. Also in 2021, Peters and Slaughter were the chief sponsors of the successfully enacted Reimagine Public Safety Act, which provided funding for community violence intervention programs such as street outreach. Peters has advocated for continued funding for community violence intervention and argued that it has been effective in reducing violence. In 2025, he was the chief Senate sponsor of the FAIR Act, which established a statewide public defender's office. Other bills sponsored by Peters include proposals to raise the minimum age at which children can be held in detention facilities, decriminalize HIV transmission, and require the presence of attorneys when police interrogate minors.

In 2023, Peters co-sponsored the Temp Worker and Fairness Safety Act, which included provisions curtail wage theft and provide workplace training and transparency for temporary workers. The bill was passed into law later that year.

Since 2023, Peters, along with Rep. Marcus Evans, has sponsored a bill that would enable and regulate offshore wind farms in Lake Michigan on the Southeast Side of Chicago, including a "Rust Belt To Green Belt" fund to support workforce diversity programs. He has also advocated for state funding to preserve limestone barriers at Promontory Point and other parts of the Lake Michigan shoreline on the South Side of Chicago.

Amid the Chicago Bears' efforts to secure state funding to build a new stadium adjacent to Soldier Field or at the former Michael Reese Hospital site, both of which are in the 13th district, Peters has generally expressed skepticism toward providing public funds and argued that the Bears should privately finance any stadium redevelopment.

=== Leadership roles ===
In December 2020, Peters was elected by his colleagues as the Senate Chair of the Illinois Legislative Black Caucus for the 2021-22 term, and served in the role again in the subsequent term. In 2025, Peters joined the Senate Democratic Caucus leadership team as Majority Whip.

=== Committees ===
In the 2019–20 term, he served as the inaugural chair of the Senate's Special Committee on Public Safety. In the next term (2021–22), he continued as chair of the Committee on Public Safety and chaired subcommittees on Children & Family, Emergency Management, and redistricting for Chicago South. In the 2023–24 and 2025–26 terms, he has chaired the Committee on Labor.

== 2026 U.S. House campaign ==
On May 13, 2025, Peters announced his campaign for Congress in Illinois's 2nd congressional district, a seat made vacant after Robin Kelly announced her run for Senate. Leaders We Deserve endorsed Peters' campaign on May 15, 2025, the first endorsement by the group led by David Hogg and Kevin Lata. He was also later endorsed by Bernie Sanders and College Democrats of America. In the primary election on March 17, 2026, Peters placed third with 12.4% of the vote.

== Electoral history ==
Illinois' 2nd congressional district, Democratic primary, 2026
Party	Candidate	Votes	%
Democratic	Donna Miller	34,034	40.4
Democratic	Jesse Jackson Jr.	24,321	28.9
Democratic	Robert Peters	10,490	12.4
Democratic	Yumeka Brown	8,534	10.1
Democratic	Willie Preston	2,463	2.9
Democratic	Patrick Keating	1,093	1.3
Democratic	Toni Brown	979	1.2
Democratic	Sidney Moore	860	1.0
Democratic	Eric France	837	1.0
Democratic	Adal Regis	685	0.8
Total votes		84,296	100.0

Illinois 13th Senate District General Election, 2024
Party	Candidate	Votes	%
Democratic	Robert Peters (Incumbent)	64,018	100.00
Democratic hold			

Illinois 13th Senate District Democratic Primary, 2024
Party	Candidate	Votes	%
Democratic	Robert Peters (incumbent)	22,553	100.0
Total votes		22,553	100.0

Illinois 13th Senate District General Election, 2020
Party	Candidate	Votes	%
Democratic	Robert Peters (incumbent)	79,024	100.0
Total votes		79,024	100.0
Democratic hold			

Illinois 13th Senate District Democratic Primary, 2020
Party	Candidate	Votes	%
Democratic	Robert Peters (incumbent)	21,646	53.26
Democratic	Ken Thomas	18,997	46.74
Total votes		40,643	100.0
