= Li Arellano Jr. =

American politician

Li Arellano Jr

Member of the Illinois Senate from the 37th district
- Incumbent
- Assumed office January 8, 2025
- Preceded by: Win Stoller

Personal details
- Party: Republican
- Education: University of Michigan (attended)
- Profession: Politician; Business owner
- Website: Legislative website

Military service
- Allegiance: United States
- Branch/service: United States Army

Liandro "Li" Arellano Jr. is an American politician and a Republican member of the Illinois Senate since January 8, 2025. He represents the 37th district which includes all or parts of Lee, Bureau, Henry, DeKalb, Ogle, Rock Island, Whiteside, Stark, Peoria, Woodford and Marshall counties.

== Early life ==
He attended the University of Michigan before joining the United States Army.

== Local politics ==
He was elected mayor of Dixon in 2015, ousting incumbent mayor in the wake of Rita Crundwell's large-scale fraud. He was reelected in 2019. He chose not to run for reelection in 2023.

== State politics ==
Prior to running for the Illinois Senate in 2024, Arellano ran for the Illinois House of Representatives twice. First, in the 2012 primary, finishing second of four candidates and losing to Tom Demmer by a narrow 3-point margin. Then, in 2022, Demmer retired to run for state treasurer, Arellano ran for the open legislative seat. Bradley Fritts, also of Dixon, defeated Arellano with 6,183 votes to Arellano's 4,558 votes. In 2023, Senator Win Stoller announced he would retire from the Illinois Senate rather than seek another term in the 2024 election. Arellano announced his candidacy for the open seat in October 2023. He also explored a run for the Illinois Senate in 2017, but chose not to challenge incumbent State Representative Brian W. Stewart (R-Freeport) in the 2018 Republican primary election.

In the 2024 Republican primary, Arellano defeated Chris Bishop, a member of the Dixon City Council, and Tim Yager, a member of the Henry County Board, for the Republican nomination.
