= Chuck Weaver =

American politician from Illinois (born 1956)

Member of the Illinois Senate from the 37th district
- In office October 8, 2015 – January 2, 2021
- Preceded by: Darin LaHood
- Succeeded by: Win Stoller

Personal details
- Born: June 22, 1956 (age 70) Peoria, Illinois, U.S.
- Party: Republican
- Spouse: Laurie
- Children: Annie Bell, Jesse Weaver, Travis Weaver
- Education: Bradley University (B.A.); DePaul University (J.D.)
- Profession: Business owner
- Committees: Education (Minority Spokesperson); Higher Education; Insurance; Labor; Licensed Activities; Transportation; Committee of the Whole

Chuck Weaver (born June 22, 1956) is a former Republican member of the Illinois Senate for the 37th Senate District. He was appointed in October 2015. The district he represented included all or parts of Mercer, Lee, Bureau, Henry, Knox, Stark, Peoria, Woodford and Marshall counties in Central Illinois.

Weaver graduated from Dunlap High School and received his bachelor's degree from nearby Bradley University and J.D. from DePaul University College of Law.

Weaver became president, of Weaver Enterprises, operator of 30 Kentucky Fried Chicken franchises.

Weaver has been on the board of the Peoria County Youth Farm, and was chairman of the City of Peoria Zoning Board of Appeals. As of 2011 he was co-owner of Peoria Builders. He was elected to an at-large city council seat in the 2011 Peoria City Council election and retained it in the 2015 election.

Weaver was chosen by a Republican committee, and sworn in, as a State Senator for the 37th Senate District in October 2015, joining the 99th Illinois General Assembly in mid-session. He ran unopposed in 2016, winning a four-year term. On January 9, 2020, it was announced that Weaver would withdraw from his reelection bid and retire from the Illinois Senate. He was replaced on the ballot by Republican businessman Win Stoller who would go on to win the election.

As of 2022, he is the chairman of the Peoria County Republican Party.

== Committees ==
- Education (Minority Spokesperson)
- Higher Education
- Insurance
- Labor
- Licensed Activities
- Transportation

== Personal life ==
In the 2022 Illinois House of Representatives election, his son Travis Weaver was elected unopposed in the 93rd district.
