= Javier Cervantes =

American politician

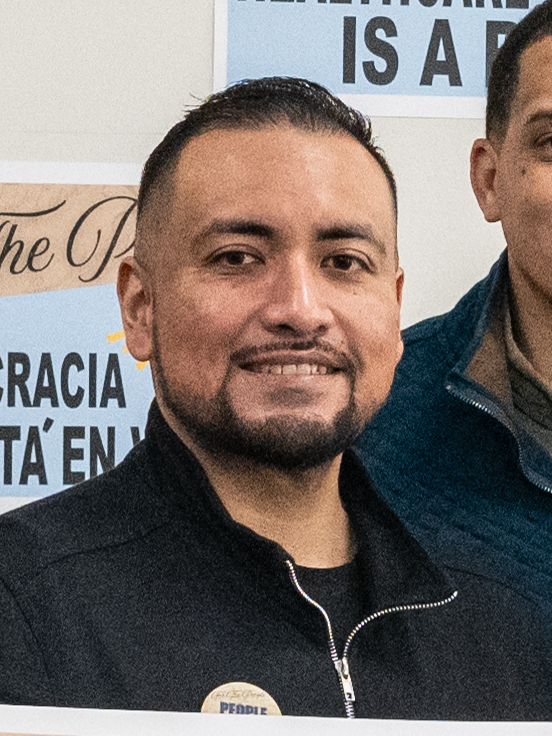
- Cervantes in 2025

Member of the Illinois Senate from the 1st district
- Incumbent
- Assumed office November 18, 2022
- Preceded by: Antonio Munoz

Personal details
- Born: Chicago, Illinois, U.S.
- Party: Democratic
- Education: University of Illinois, Chicago

Javier Loera Cervantes is a Democratic member of the Illinois Senate from the 1st legislative district since November 18, 2022.

Cervantes won the election to the 103rd General Assembly and was appointed during the 102nd to replace outgoing State Senator Antonio Munoz.

== Early life, education, and career ==
Cervantes was born in the South Side area of Chicago. He graduated from Benito Juarez Community Academy and studied visual communications at International Academy of Design and Technology and labor studies at University of Illinois Chicago. He worked in the Service Employees International Union from 2006 to 2018. He worked as campaign manager for then-State Senator Antonio Munoz in the 2020 Illinois Senate election.

== Personal life ==
He has a daughter, Madison. He was previously engaged, to daughter of former, Antonio Munoz, who served as State Senator for the 1st district before Cervantes.

== Electoral history ==
2022 Illinois' 1st legislative district Democratic primary results
Party	Candidate	Votes	%
Democratic	Javier Loera Cervantes	9,319	100.0
Total votes		99,319	100.0

2022 Illinois' 1st legislative district election results
Party	Candidate	Votes	%
Democratic	Javier Loera Cervantes	27,928	100.0
Total votes		27,928	100.0
