= Win Stoller =

American politician

Member of the Illinois Senate from the 37th district
- In office January 5, 2021 – January 8, 2025
- Preceded by: Chuck Weaver
- Succeeded by: Li Arellano Jr

Personal details
- Born: Winston John Stoller
- Party: Republican
- Education: University of Illinois
- Profession: Businessperson
- Website: https://senatorstoller.com

Winston John "Win" Stoller is a former Republican member of the Illinois Senate from the 37th district. The 37th district, located in North and Central Illinois, includes all or parts of Lee, Bureau, Henry, DeKalb, Ogle, Rock Island, Whiteside, Stark, Peoria, Woodford and Marshall counties.

Previously, Stoller was sworn in on January 5, 2021, allowing him to serve in the 101st General Assembly's lame duck session. He then served his first term in the 102nd Illinois General Assembly.

== Professional career ==
Stoller has a bachelor of science in accountancy and a master of business administration, both from the University of Illinois Urbana-Champaign. Stoller has spent the last 23 years working at Widmer Interiors in Peoria where he is currently a co-owner and CEO. Prior to that, he was a CPA and an auditor for PricewaterhouseCoopers.

== Legislative career ==
In the 2020 general election, Stoller was elected to succeed Chuck Weaver in as senator from the 37th district. Weaver resigned effective January 2, 2021. The Legislative Committee of the Republican Party of the 37th Legislative District appointed Stoller to fill the subsequent vacancy for remainder the 101st General Assembly. Stoller was sworn in on January 5, 2021. Stoller was re-elected to a second term on November 8, 2022, and was officially sworn into the 103rd Illinois General Assembly on January 11, 2023.

Stoller serves on the following committees in the 103rd General Assembly: Agriculture (Minority Spokesperson); Appropriations; Health and Human Services; Insurance; Revenue; State Government; Special Committee on Pensions; State Government Special Issues. In February 2023, Stoller was selected as 2022 Freshman Legislator of the Year in the Illinois Senate by the Associated Builders and Contractors, Illinois Chapter for his efforts in protecting free enterprise and workforce development.

Senate Bill 2531 Senator Stoller's bill to redefine the Illinois tax code allowed small businesses organized as pass through entities to once again fully deduct their state and local taxes on their federal tax returns. This was revenue neutral for the state of Illinois. Senate Bill 2531 had significant bipartisan support and passed both the Illinois House and Senate. It was signed into law by Governor J.B. Pritzker on August 27, 2021. It created the Pass-through Entity (PTE) tax which is an entity-level income tax that partnerships (other than publicly traded partnerships under IRC 7704) and subchapter S-corporations may elect to pay effective for tax years ending on or after December 31, 2021, and beginning prior to January 1, 2026. The election to pay the PTE tax is made on Form IL-1065, Partnership Replacement Tax Return or Form IL-1120-ST, Small Business Replacement Tax Return.

Stoller chose not to seek reelection in the 2024 election. He was succeeded by fellow Republican Li Arellano Jr., a former mayor of Dixon, Illinois.

== Community Leadership ==
Senator Stoller has a long history of community leadership including Past President and 22-year member of the Rotary Club of Peoria, Past President and 23-year member of Peoria Area Salvation Army, Past Chair of the Board and 24-year member of the Peoria Area Chamber of Commerce, and past Treasurer of Business PAC of Central Illinois. He also served on the Illinois State University College of Business Advisory Board for over 9 years.

== Personal life ==
Senator Stoller met his wife, Amy Stoller, at the University of Illinois and they have been married since 1992. They have two adult children. Stoller is a lifelong resident of Germantown Hills, Illinois. Stoller graduated from Metamora High School and played on the basketball team during his time there. Stoller is a Church Elder and long-time member at Grace Presbyterian Church in Peoria, IL. He has served there as a Campus Outreach Board Member for 12 years. In his free time, Stoller trains for triathlon races and has competed in two full-distance Ironman triathlons. He also enjoys spending time with his family.
