= Jennifer Bertino-Tarrant =

American politician

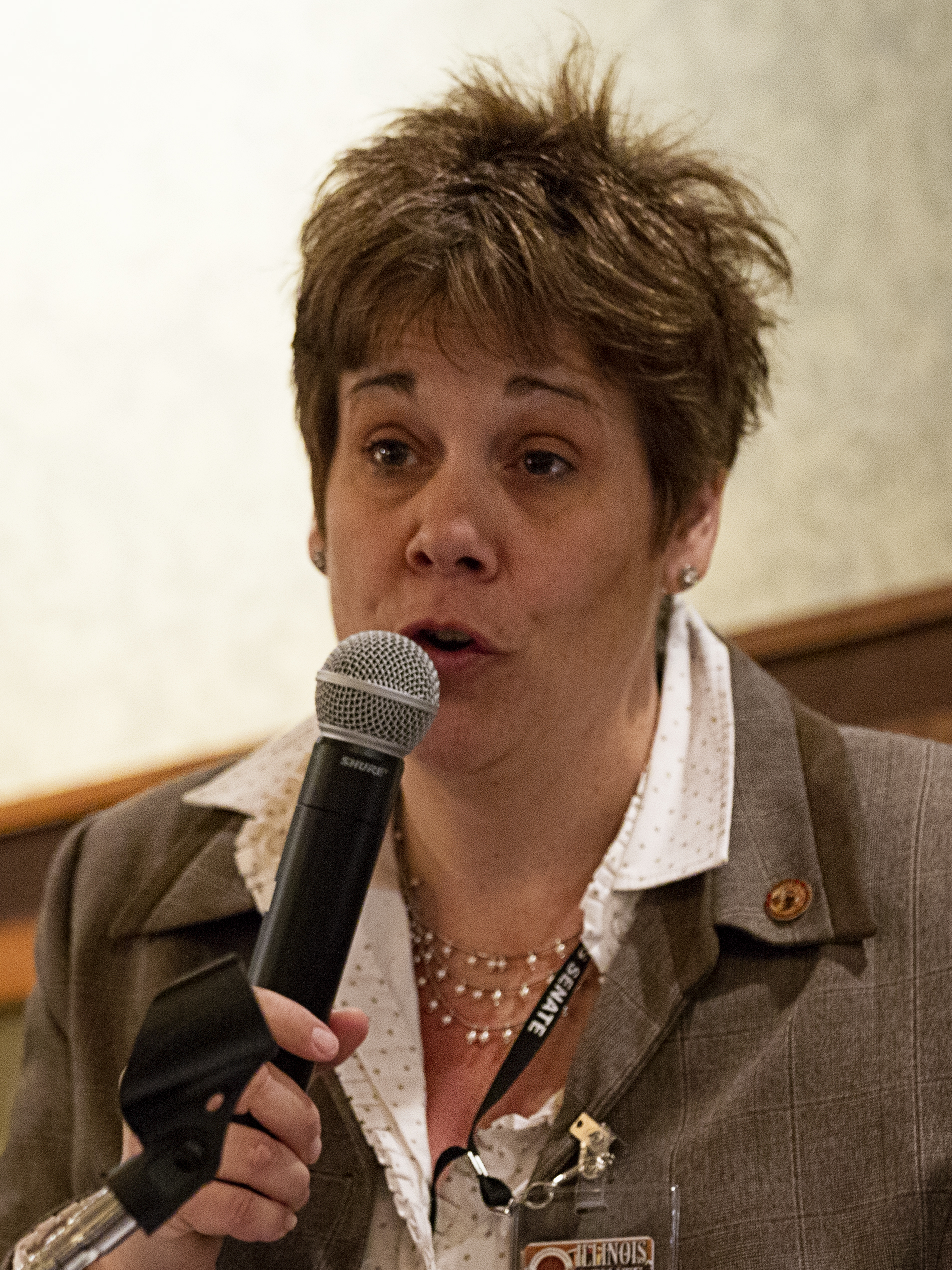
- Bertino-Tarrant at 2015 Alzheimer's Association Lobby Day

Executive of Will County
- Incumbent
- Assumed office December 7, 2020
- Preceded by: Denise Winfrey (acting)

Member of the Illinois Senate from the 49th district
- In office January 9, 2013 – December 7, 2020
- Preceded by: Sam McCann (redistricted)
- Succeeded by: Meg Loughran Cappel

Personal details
- Born: April 1969 (age 57) Joliet, Illinois, U.S.
- Party: Democratic
- Education: Illinois State University (BA); University of St. Francis (MS); Loyola University Chicago (EdD)

Jennifer Bertino-Tarrant (born April 1969) is a Democrat who is currently serving as the Will County Executive, having been elected in 2020. She was a member of the Illinois Senate for the 49th district. The 49th district includes all or part of Bolingbrook, Crest Hill, Joliet, Oswego, Plainfield, Romeoville, and Shorewood. Prior to her service as an Illinois State Senator, she served as the Will County Superintendent of Schools and as both an educator and administrator in public and private schools.

== Early life, education and career ==
She attended the University of St. Francis and received a masters in Curriculum and Instruction with a secondary teaching certificate in History/Social Sciences. She later earned a doctorate in education with Superintendent's Endorsement from Loyola University. She has worked as a teacher and administrator in both public and private schools in Will County.

Bertino-Tarrant is a lifelong resident of Will County and is the owner-operator of a family business operating in Joliet. She is also involved in the Joliet Chamber of Commerce & Industry, and the Troy Educational Foundation Board. She is a parishioner at St. Paul the Apostle Church.

== Will County Superintendent of Schools ==
In 2007, Bertino-Tarrant unseated the incumbent to become the Will County Regional Superintendent of Schools. The Will County Regional Superintendent heads the Regional Office of Education (ROE) for Will County. The office acts as an intermediate between the State Board of Education and local school districts. The office administers truancy prevention, GED testing, life safety inspections of school buildings, bus driver training, continuing education for educators and assisting school districts in complying with various state laws. In her capacity as Superintendent, she also serves as the ex-oficio Secretary of the Will County Regional Board of School Trustees.

As Regional Superintendent, she established Lincoln School as an alternative program for at-risk students. The program is a hybrid of computer-based classes with direct teacher instruction.

== Illinois State Senator ==
=== 2012 election ===
Jennifer Bertino-Tarrant was the Democratic nominee for the 49th State Senate district facing Garrett Peck in the general election. In the general election she was endorsed by the AFL-CIO, Associated Firefighters of Illinois, Illinois Education Association and Illinois Farm Bureau.

On election night, Bertino-Tarrant defeated Peck to become the State Senator elect from the 49th district.

Illinois State Senate District 49 election – 2012
Party	Candidate	Votes	%
Democratic	Jennifer Bertino-Tarrant	41,766	52.73
Republican	Garrett Peck	37,439	47.27
Total votes		79,205	100

=== Tenure ===
Bertino-Tarrant's associated representatives will be District 97 Representative Mark Batinick (R-Plainfield) and District 98 Representative Natalie Manley (D-Joliet). In 2018, Governor-elect J. B. Pritzker appointed Bertino-Tarrant to the Educational Success transition committee, which is responsible for state education policy. In 2020, Bertino-Tarrant opted to run for Will County Executive and was succeeded in the Illinois Senate by fellow Democrat Meg Loughran Cappel. Loughran Cappel was sworn in early, on December 10, 2020, to fill the vacancy left by Bertino-Tarrant's assumption of her County Executive position.
