= Laura Murphy (politician) =

American politician

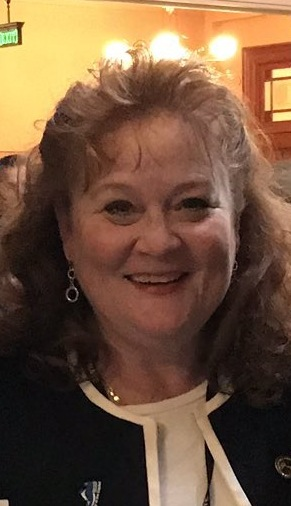
- Murphy in 2019

Member of the Illinois Senate from the 28th district
- Incumbent
- Assumed office October 5, 2015
- Preceded by: Dan Kotowski

Personal details
- Born: Park Ridge, Illinois, U.S.
- Party: Democratic
- Education: Illinois State University (BA)

Laura M. Murphy is a Democratic member of the Illinois Senate representing the 28th district since October 2015. The 28th district includes all or parts of Arlington Heights, Bartlett, Bloomingdale, Des Plaines, Elk Grove Village, Hanover Park, Hoffman Estates, Park Ridge, Roselle and Schaumburg.

She previously served as a member of the Des Plaines City Council.

As of July 2022, Senator Murphy is a member of the following Illinois Senate committees:

- (Chairwoman of) Appropriations - Constitutional Offices Committee (SAPP-SACO)
- Appropriations Committee (SAPP)
- Assignments Committee (SCOA)
- Commerce Committee (SCOM)
- Environment and Conservation Committee (SNVR)
- Executive Committee (SEXC)
- (Chairwoman of) Executive Appointments Committee (SEXA)
- (Chairwoman of) Executive - Elections Committee (SEXC-SEOE)
- Executive - Government Operations Committee (SEXC-SEGO)
- Financial Institutions Committee (SFIC)
- Higher Education Committee (SCHE)
- Labor Committee (SLAB)
- Local Government Committee (SLGV)
- Redistricting Committee (SRED)
- Redistricting - Northwest Cook County (SRED-SRNC)

== Electoral history ==
Illinois 28th Senate District General Election, 2022
| Party | Candidate | Votes | % | ±% |
|---|---|---|---|---|
| Democratic | Laura M. Murphy (incumbent) | 33,259 | 58.13 | −41.87% |
| Republican | Sal Raspanti | 23,958 | 41.87 | +41.87% |
| Total votes | | 57,217 | 100.0 | |
