= Willie Preston =

American politician (born 1985)

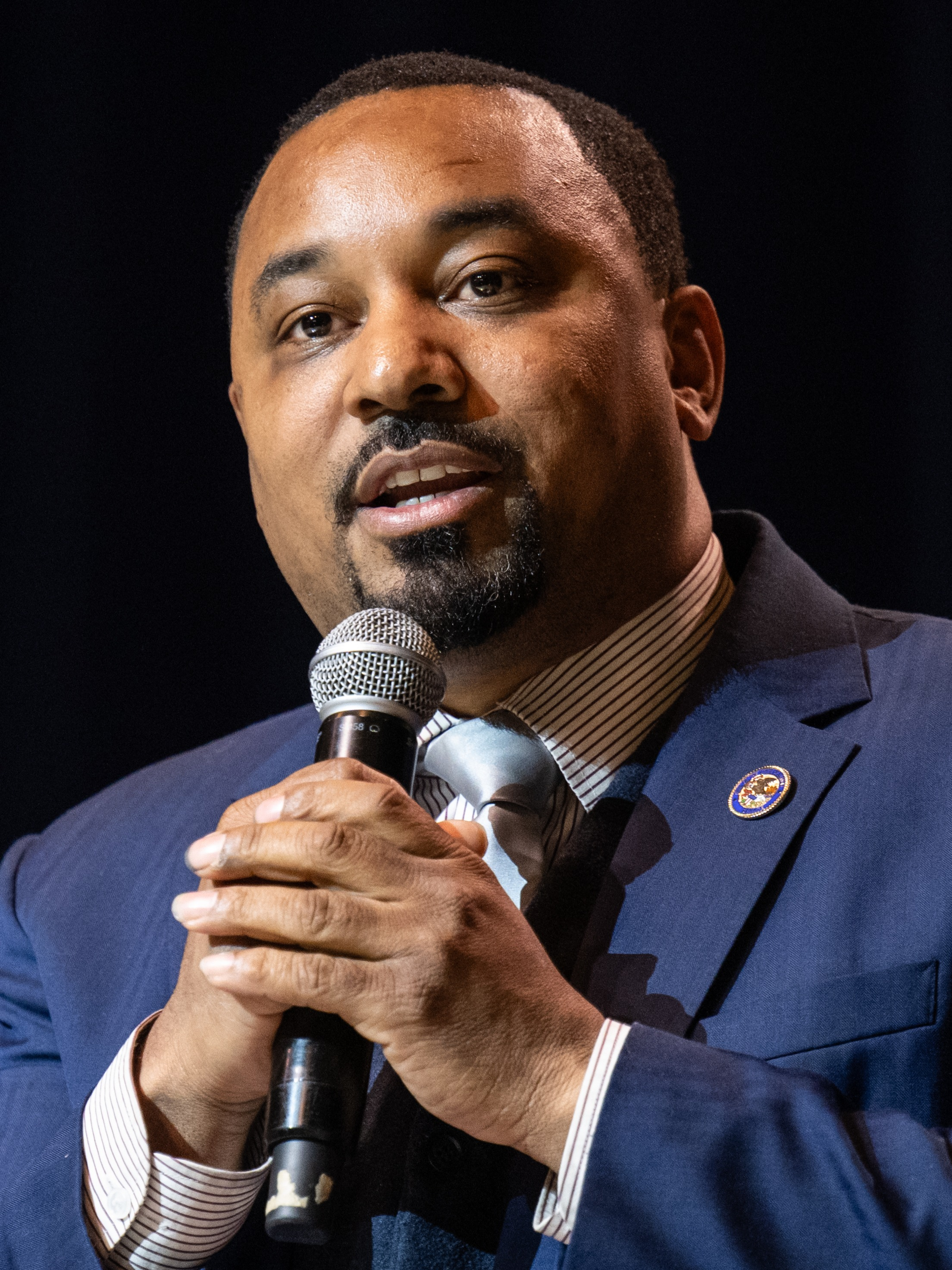
- Preston at candidate forum in 2026

Member of the Illinois Senate from the 16th district
- Incumbent
- Assumed office January 11, 2023
- Preceded by: Jacqueline Y. Collins

Personal details
- Born: February 1, 1985 (age 41)
- Party: Democratic
- Education: Chicago State University; Roosevelt University

Willie Preston (born February 1, 1985) is an American politician and activist serving as a member of the Illinois Senate for the 16th district. Elected in November 2022, he assumed office on January 11, 2023.

== Education and career ==
Preston attended Chicago State University and Roosevelt University. He was a local school council member for Scott Joplin Elementary.

Preston worked as a union carpenter. He later worked as an organizer for Southsiders Organized for Unity and Liberation (SOUL).

== Political career ==
=== 2018 Illinois House of Representatives election ===
Preston was an unsuccessful candidate for the Illinois House of Representatives in 2018

=== 2022 Illinois State Senate election ===
In 2022, Preston was elected to the Illinois Senate in November 2022.

=== 2026 U.S. House election ===
In August 2025, Preston announced his intent to run for Illinois's 2nd congressional district seat in the 2026 election. The seat is vacant due to Robin Kelly opting to run for the U.S. Senate seat currently occupied by Dick Durbin, who is retiring at the end of his term. During the primary, in November 2025, the Chicago Tribune reported on Preston posts to Facebook in 2020 attacking Joe Biden, calling on Black men to vote for Donald Trump, and claiming that Preston himself had voted for Trump in the 2020 election. Preston acknowledged writing the posts but claimed he had not actually voted for Trump. On March 17, 2026, Preston lost to Donna Miller.
