= Meg Loughran Cappel =

American politician

Member of the Illinois Senate from the 49th district
- Incumbent
- Assumed office December 10, 2020
- Preceded by: Jennifer Bertino-Tarrant

Personal details
- Party: Democratic
- Spouse: Jason
- Children: 3
- Relatives: Francis J. Loughran (Grandfather)

Mary "Meg" Loughran Cappel is a Democratic member of the Illinois Senate from the 49th district since December 10, 2020. The 49th district, located in the Chicago area, includes all or parts of Aurora, Bolingbrook, Boulder Hill, Channahon, Crest Hill, Crystal Lawns, Joliet, Montgomery, Naperville, Oswego, Plainfield, Romeoville, and Shorewood.

Cappel was elected to the Illinois Senate to succeed Jennifer Bertino-Tarrant, who successfully ran for Will County, Illinois Executive. Cappel was appointed early on December 10, 2020, after Bertino-Tarrant resigned her state Senator position and inaugurated as Executive on December 7, 2020.

== Early life, education, and career ==
Cappel grew up in Joliet, Illinois. She is a lifelong educator, specializing in special education. She currently serves on the Shorewood Chamber of Commerce. She previously served as a union representative for AFT-IFT Local 604. In 2019, she and her husband Jason started a small business named Elite Driving School in Shorewood.

== Political career ==
In 2017, Cappel was elected to the Joliet Township High School District 204 Board. In 2020, Cappel ran for the Illinois Senate 49th district and won with a 12% margin of victory.

As of July 2022, Senator Cappel was a member of the following Illinois Senate committee:

- Appropriations - Education Committee (SAPP-SAED)
- Appropriations - Emergency Management Committee (SAPP-SAEM)
- Behavioral and Mental Health Committee (SBMH)
- Commerce Committee (SCOM)
- Education Committee (SESE)
- Labor Committee (SLAB)
- Redistricting - Kankakee & Will Counties Committee (SRED-SDKW)
- State Government Committee (SGOA)

== Electoral history ==
Joliet Township High School District 204 Board General Election, 2017
Party	Candidate	Votes	%
Nonpartisan	Tracy Spesia	6,465	29.03
Nonpartisan	Mary 'Meg' Cappel	5,888	26.44
Nonpartisan	Angel Contreras	5,284	23.73
Nonpartisan	Frank Edmon, Jr.	4,632	20.80
Total votes		22,269	100.0

Illinois 49th State Senate District Democratic Primary, 2020
Party	Candidate	Votes	%
Democratic	Meg Loughran Cappel	15,159	59.50
Democratic	Larry E. Hug	5,203	20.42
Democratic	Michael Crowner	5,114	20.07
Total votes		25,476	100.0

Illinois 49th State Senate District General Election, 2020
Party	Candidate	Votes	%
Democratic	Meg Loughran Cappel	64,276	56.22
Republican	Thomas McCullagh	50,052	43.78
Total votes		114,328	100.0

== Personal life ==
Cappel, her husband Jason, and her three children all currently reside in Shorewood, Illinois.
