= Patrick Joyce (politician) =

American politician

Member of the Illinois Senate from the 40th district
- Incumbent
- Assumed office November 8, 2019
- Preceded by: Toi Hutchinson

Personal details
- Party: Democratic
- Children: 3
- Education: Illinois State University (BA)
- Occupation: Farmer
- Website: Constituent Website

Patrick J. Joyce is a Democratic member of the Illinois Senate from the 40th district since November 8, 2019. The 40th district, located partly in the Chicago area, includes all or parts of Bourbonnais, Bradley, Chicago Heights, Coal City, Essex, Flossmoor, Frankfort, Glenwood, Hazel Crest, Homewood, Joliet, Kankakee, Manhattan, Matteson, Mokena, Monee, New Lenox, Park Forest, Richton Park, Steger, University Park, and Wilmington.

Joyce was appointed to the district on November 8, 2019 after former State Senator Toi Hutchinson resigned to become the new Illinois Cannabis Regulation Oversight Officer.

== Early life, education, and career ==
Joyce was raised in Reddick, Illinois. He graduated from Illinois State University with a B.A. in Agribusiness. He is a fourth generation farmer and for 25 years has owned and operated his family farm. For 19 years he has been a member of the Kankakee County Farm Bureau Board of Directors.

== Illinois State Senator ==
As of July 2022, Senator Joyce is a member of the following Illinois Senate committee:

- (Chairman of) Agriculture Committee (SAGR)
- Appropriations - Agriculture, Environment & Energy Committee (SAPP-SAAE)
- Energy and Public Utilities Committee (SENE)
- Health Committee (SHEA)
- Labor Committee (SLAB)
- Local Government Committee (SLGV)
- Next Generation of Energy Committee (SENE-ENGE)
- (Chairman of) Redistricting - Kankakee & Will Counties Committee (SRED-SDKW)
- State Government Committee (SGOA)
- (Chairman of) Subcommittee on Long-Term Care & Aging (SHEA-SHLT)

== Electoral history ==
Illinois 40th State Senate District Democratic Primary, 2020
Party	Candidate	Votes	%
Democratic	Patrick J. Joyce (incumbent)	11,387	46.74
Democratic	Lori Wilcox	6,474	26.57
Democratic	Monica M. Gordon	4,811	19.75
Democratic	Marta Perales	1,692	6.94
Total votes		24,364	100.0

== Personal life ==
Joyce is married and has three children. He currently lives in Essex, Illinois. His daughter Katelyn died of leukemia in 2011. Since her death, Joyce has raised money at the Leukemia & Lymphoma Society's Light the Night fundraiser in her memory.
