= Cristina Castro (politician) =

American politician (born 1978)

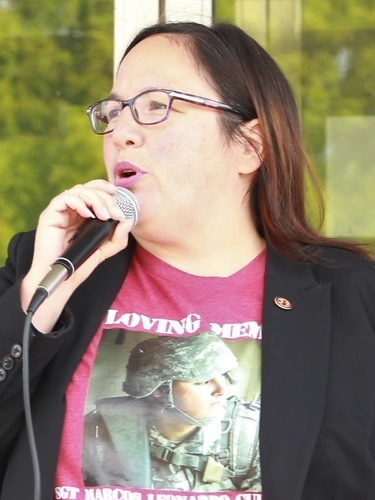
- Castro speaking in 2019

Member of the Illinois Senate from the 22nd district
- Incumbent
- Assumed office January 11, 2017
- Preceded by: Mike Noland

Personal details
- Born: February 25, 1978 (age 48) Elgin, Illinois, U.S.
- Party: Democratic
- Education: Elgin Community College (AS); Northern Illinois University (BS, MBA)

Cristina Castro (born February 25, 1978) is a Democratic member of the Illinois Senate who took office in January 2017. Castro represents the 22nd district, which includes all or portions of Elgin, Barrington Hills, Carpentersville, East Dundee and South Elgin, Streamwood, Hoffman Estates, Hanover Park, Schaumburg, and Bartlett.

Prior to her election to the Illinois Senate, Castro was a member of the Kane County Board and Illinois Housing Development Authority. Castro, an Elgin resident, has an Associate of Science from Elgin Community College and a Bachelor of Science and a Master of Business Administration from Northern Illinois University.

In 2018, J. B. Pritzker appointed Castro a member of the gubernatorial transition's Job Creation and Economic Opportunity Committee.

As of July 2022, Senator Castro is a member of the following Illinois Senate committees:

- Appropriations - Business Regulations and Labor Committee (SAPP-SBRL)
- Appropriations - Revenue and Finance Committee (SARP-SARF)
- Commerce Committee (SCOM)
- Energy and Public Utilities Committee (SENE)
- (Chairwoman of) Executive Committee (SEXC)
- (Chairwoman of) Executive - Cannabis Committee (SEXC-SEOC)
- Healthcare Access and Availability Committee (SHAA)
- Insurance Committee (SINS)
- Labor Committee (SLAB)
- Redistricting Committee (SRED)
- Redistricting - Kane and Kendall Counties (SDKK)
