= Arthur A. Telcser =

American politician

Arthur A. Telcser (January 17, 1932 – November 26, 1999) was an American pharmacist and politician.

Born in Chicago, Illinois, Telcser received his degree in pharmacy from UIC College of Pharmacy and then owned Wilart Drugs, a pharmacy business, in Chicago. He joined the Republican Party in 1954 and was active with the Young Republicans. In 1966, Telcser was elected to the Illinois House of Representatives as one of three representatives from the 11th Legislative District. He quickly rose to legislative leadership becoming House Majority Whip in 1969. He would go on to be appointed to other leadership positions; Assistant Majority Leader in 1973; Assistant Minority Leader in 1975; Minority Whip in 1977; Assistant Minority Leader in 1979 and Majority Leader in 1981. During his legislative tenure, Telcser was a resident of the Lake View neighborhood. He briefly served as the Speaker of the Illinois House of Representatives. In 1983, Telcser then worked in the Illinois Secretary of State office under George Ryan. In 1998, after Ryan was elected Governor of Illinois, Telcser joined his transition team. Telcser had Parkinson's disease and died at his home in Chicago of a heart attack on November 26, 1999. He was Jewish.

== Notes ==
Illinois House of Representatives
Preceded by At-large district abolished	Member of the Illinois House of Representatives from the 11th district 1967–1973; Served alongside: John Merlo, Frank Lyman, Bruce L. Douglas	Succeeded by Joseph R. Lundy; Arthur Berman; James P. McCourt
Preceded by Paul J. Randolph; Ira Colitz; Robert L. Thompson	Member of the Illinois House of Representatives from the 12th district 1973–1983; Served alongside: Bruce L. Douglas, John Merlo, William A. Marovitz, Ellis B. Levin, John Cullerton	Succeeded by Alfred Ronan
Preceded by Jack E. Walker	Majority Whip of the Illinois House of Representatives; 1969–1973; Served alongside: William D. Cox	Succeeded by W. J. Murphy; C. L. McCormick
Preceded by W. Timothy Simms; Brian Barnett Duff	Minority Whip of the Illinois House of Representatives; 1977–1979; Served alongside: R. Bruce Waddell	Succeeded by Philip W. Collins; William Benjamin Polk
Preceded by Michael Madigan	Majority Leader of the Illinois House of Representatives; 1981–1983	Succeeded by Jim McPike
Political offices
Preceded by George Ryan	Speaker of the Illinois House of Representatives; 1983	Succeeded by Michael Madigan
