= Illinois's 12th House of Representatives district =

American legislative district

Illinois's 12th State House of Representatives district
Representative
Margaret Croke; D–Chicago
since 2021
- Demographics: 74.3% White; 5.0% Black; 8.5% Hispanic; 7.7% Asian; 0.1% Native American; 0.0% Hawaiian/Pacific Islander; 0.4% Other; 3.9% Multiracial
- Population (2020): 118,591
- Created: 1983–present 1849–1873, 1957–1973

Illinois's 12th House of Representatives district is a Representative district within the Illinois House of Representatives located in Cook County, Illinois. It has been represented by Democrat Margaret Croke since January 2, 2021. The district was previously represented by Democrat Yoni Pizer for ten months in 2020.

The district includes parts of the Chicago neighborhoods of Lake View, Lincoln Park, and Near North Side.

== Representative district history ==
Prior to the ratification of the 1848 Illinois Constitution, counties (or two or more counties) were designated a certain number of Senators and Representatives. With the ratification of the 1848 Illinois Constitution, Legislative and Representative districts were numbered and called by name. Each district was still assigned a certain number of Senators and Representatives. After the passage of the 1872 Apportionment, only Legislative districts were drawn with Representatives elected cumulatively. The 1954 amendment to the 1870 Illinois Constitution established Representative districts as separate from Legislative districts (with representatives still elected cumulatively). The boundaries of Representative and Legislative districts would differ. After the United States Supreme Court ruled in Reynolds v. Sims (1964) that "both houses of state legislatures must be apportioned according to districts of equal population," new districts were redrawn for the Illinois Senate and Illinois House of Representatives. While the Legislative districts were redrawn, the Governor and General Assembly failed to agree on Representative district boundaries. Under the 1954 amendment, "a 10-man bipartisan commission appointed by the governor from recommendations made by both parties" were directed to redraw boundaries but failed to do so in 1963. Because of this failure, and with no district boundaries redrawn, all Representative districts were temporarily merged into one at-large district with 177 representatives (the total number of representatives at the time). The 1964 Illinois House election had several candidates running for all 177 seats throughout the state. In 1965, the Representative districts were redrawn by the Illinois Legislative Reapportionment Commission and elections held in 1966 were done with separate districts. With the 1971 Apportionment (and adoption of the 1970 Illinois Constitution), Representative districts were abolished and representatives were once again elected cumulatively per Legislative district. After the passage of the Cutback Amendment in 1980, the number of Representatives was reduced from 177 to 118 with Representative districts re-established and now electing a single representative.

== List of representatives ==
=== 1849 – 1855 ===
Representative	Party	Years (Note: From 1870 to 1970, the GA met for a new session on the Wednesday after the first Monday of January.)	General Assembly (GA)	Electoral history	Counties represented
12th Representative district established with 1848 Illinois Constitution.
Joshua P. Cooper	Democratic	January 1, 1849 – January 6, 1851	16th	Elected in 1848; Was not re-elected in 1850.	Clark
T. C. Moore	Unknown	January 6, 1851 – January 3, 1853	17th	Elected in 1850; Was not re-elected in 1852.	Clark
Uri Manley	Democratic	January 3, 1853 – January 1, 1855	18th	Elected in 1852; Was not re-elected in 1854.	Clark
District now elects two representatives with 1855 Apportionment.

=== 1855 – 1861 ===
Representative	Party	Party Control	Years	General Assembly (GA)	Electoral history	Counties represented
District now elects two representatives with 1855 Apportionment.
William C. Kinney	Democratic	2 Democrats	January 1, 1855 – January 5, 1857	19th	Elected in 1854; Was not re-elected in 1856.	St. Clair
Albert H. Trapp	Democratic	2 Democrats	January 1, 1855 – January 5, 1857	19th	Elected in 1854; Was not re-elected in 1856.	St. Clair
Vital Jarrot	Republican	1 Republican; 1 Unknown	January 5, 1857 – January 5, 1863	20th 21st 22nd	Elected in 1856; Re-elected in 1858; Re-elected in 1860; Was not re-elected in 1862.	St. Clair
William W. Roman	Unknown	1 Republican; 1 Unknown	January 5, 1857 – January 3, 1859	20th	Elected in 1856; Was not re-elected in 1858	St. Clair
John Scheel	Republican	2 Republicans	January 3, 1859 – January 7, 1861	21st	Elected in 1858; Was not re-elected in 1860.	St. Clair
Samuel Stookey	Unknown	1 Republican; 1 Unknown	January 7, 1861 – January 5, 1863	22nd	Elected in 1860; Was not re-elected in 1862.	St. Clair
District now elects one representative with 1861 Apportionment.

=== 1861 – 1873 ===
Representative	Party	Years	General Assembly (GA)	Electoral history	Counties represented
District now elects one representative with 1861 Apportionment.
John W. Westcott	Unknown	January 5, 1863 – January 2, 1865	23rd	Elected in 1862; Was not re-elected in 1864.	Clay; Richland
Lewis W. Miller	Democratic	January 2, 1865 – January 7, 1867	24th	Elected in 1864; Was not re-elected in 1866.	Clay; Richland
Eli Bower	Unknown	January 7, 1867 – January 4, 1869	25th	Elected in 1866; Was not re-elected in 1868.	Clay; Richland
Alex W. Bothwell	Republican	January 4, 1869 – January 4, 1871	26th	Elected in 1868; Was not re-elected in 1870.	Clay; Richland
W. W. Barr	Democratic	January 4, 1871 – January 8, 1873	27th	Elected in 1870; Was not re-elected in 1872.	Franklin
District abolished with 1872 Reapportionment as 3 Representatives were now elected cumulatively from Legislative districts.

=== 1957 – 1973 ===
Representative	Party	Party Control	Years (Note: Since 1970, the GA meets on the second Wednesday of January for a new session.)	General Assembly (GA)	Electoral history	Counties represented
District re-established in 1957.
Charles H. Kordowski	Democratic	2 Democrats; 1 Republican	January 9, 1957 – January 4, 1961	70th 71st	Elected in 1956; Re-elected in 1958; Retired.	Cook
Kenneth W. Course	Democratic	2 Democrats; 1 Republican	January 9, 1957 – January 6, 1965	70th 71st 72nd 73rd	Elected in 1956; Re-elected in 1958; Re-elected in 1960; Re-elected in 1962; Ran in the At-large district election and won re-election in 1964.	Cook
Charles O. Miller	Republican	2 Democrats; 1 Republican	January 9, 1957 – January 6, 1965	70th 71st 72nd 73rd	Elected in 1956; Re-elected in 1958; Re-elected in 1960; Re-elected in 1962; Ran in the At-large district election and lost re-election in 1964.	Cook
LaSalle J. Michaels	Democratic	2 Democrats; 1 Republican	January 4, 1961 – January 6, 1965	72nd 73rd	Elected in 1960; Re-elected in 1962; Ran in the At-large district election and won re-election in 1964.	Cook
The district was temporarily abolished from 1965 to 1967 due to the Redistricting Commission in 1963 failing to reach an agreement. An at-large election was held electing 177 Representatives from across the state.
Paul J. Randolph	Republican	2 Democrats; 1 Republican	January 4, 1967 – January 10, 1973	75th 76th 77th	Re-districted from At-large district and re-elected in 1966; Re-elected in 1968; Re-elected in 1970; Redistricted to the 13th Legislative district and re-elected in 1972.	Cook
Edward W. Wolbank	Democratic	2 Democrats; 1 Republican	January 4, 1967 – January 13, 1971	75th 76th	Re-districted from At-large district and re-elected in 1966; Re-elected in 1968; Lost election for Illinois's 9th congressional district in 1970.	Cook
William J. Schoeninger	Democratic	2 Democrats; 1 Republican	January 4, 1967 – January 8, 1969	75th	Re-districted from At-large district and re-elected in 1966; Elected state Senator from the 12th Legislative district in 1968.	Cook
Robert L. Thompson	Democratic	2 Democrats; 1 Republican	January 8, 1969 – January 10, 1973	76th 77th	Elected in 1968; Re-elected in 1970; Redistricted to the 13th Legislative district and re-elected in 1972.	Cook
Ira Colitz	Democratic	2 Democrats; 1 Republican	January 13, 1971 – January 10, 1973	77th	Elected in 1970; Redistricted to the 13th Legislative district and lost renomination in 1972.	Cook
District abolished with 1971 Reapportionment as Representatives were once again elected from Legislative districts.

=== 1983 – Present ===
Representative	Party	Years	General Assembly (GA)	Electoral history	Counties represented
District re-established with representatives now elected one per district with the passage of the Cutback Amendment
Alfred Ronan	Democratic	January 12, 1983 – 1992/1993	83rd 84th 85th 86th 87th	Elected in 1982; Re-elected in 1984; Re-elected in 1986; Re-elected in 1988; Re-elected in 1990; Retired before the end of the 87th GA.	Cook
Vacant		1992/1993 – 1992/1993	87th		Cook
Charles A. Lomanto	Democratic	1992/1993 – January 13, 1993	87th	Appointed to serve the remainder of Ronan's term.	Cook
Ellis B. Levin	Democratic	January 13, 1993 – January 11, 1995	88th	Redistricted from the 5th Legislative district and re-elected in 1992; Lost renomination in 1994.	Cook
Sara Feigenholtz	Democratic	January 11, 1995 – January 21, 2020	89th 90th 91st 92nd 93rd 94th 95th 96th 97th 98th 99th 100th 101st	Elected in 1994; Re-elected in 1996; Re-elected in 1998; Re-elected in 2000; Re-elected in 2002; Re-elected in 2004; Re-elected in 2006; Re-elected in 2008; Re-elected in 2010; Re-elected in 2012; Re-elected in 2014; Re-elected in 2016; Re-elected in 2018; Appointed state Senator from the 6th Legislative district in 2020.	Cook
Vacant		January 21, 2020 – February 9, 2020	101st		Cook
Yoni Pizer	Democratic	February 9, 2020 – December 31, 2020	101st	Appointed, lost renomination, and resigned his seat in 2020.	Cook
Vacant		December 31, 2020 – January 2, 2021	101st		Cook
Margaret Croke	Democratic	January 2, 2021 – present	101st 102nd 103rd	Elected in 2020 and appointed in 2021; Re-elected in 2022	Cook

== Historic district boundaries ==
Years	County	Municipalities/Townships	Notes
2023 – present	Cook	Chicago (Lake View, Lincoln Park, Near North Side)	
2013 – 2023	Cook	Chicago (Lake View, Lincoln Park, Near North Side, Uptown)	
2003 – 2013	Cook	Chicago	
1993 – 2003	Cook	Chicago	
1983 – 1993	Cook	Chicago	
1967 – 1973	Cook	Chicago	
1957 – 1965	Cook	Chicago	
1871 – 1873	Franklin	Airfield, Benton, Big Muddy, Cave, Crittenden, Ewing, Fitts Hill, Frankfort (West Frankfort), Greenville, Little Muddy, Marcy, Mulkeytown, Osage, Parish, Plain View, Taylor Hill, Town Mount, Webb's Prairie	
1863 – 1871	Clay; Richland	Claremont, Clay City, Fairview, Flora, Georgetown, Gordon, Hadley, Horde, Larkingsburg, Louisville, Matthew's Mill, Maysville, Noble, Olney, Oskaloosa, Parkersburg, Stringtown, Wakefield, Xenia	
1855 – 1863	St. Clair	Athens (New Athens), Belleville, Cahokia, Caseyville, Centreville, Collinsville, Darmstadt, Fayetteville, French Village, Georgetown, Hilltown, Illinois City, Illinoistown, Jefferson, Lebanon, Lenzburg, Lively, Marissa, Mascoutah, Millstadt, O'Fallon, Prairie du Pont, Shiloh, Smithton, Stringtown, Summerfield, Urbana, Wiggins Ferry	
1849 – 1855	Clark	Casey, Darwin, Johnstons Mills, Livingston, Margaretta, Marshall, Martinsville, Melrose, Parkers Prairie, Sterling, Westfield	

== Electoral history ==
=== 2030 – 2022 ===
2022 Illinois House of Representatives election
Party	Candidate	Votes	%	±%
Democratic	Margaret Croke (incumbent)	31,332	80.20	−19.80%
Republican	George Kemper	7735	19.80	N/A
Total votes		39,067	100.0	

=== 2020 – 2012 ===
2020 Illinois House of Representatives election
Party	Candidate	Votes	%
Democratic	Margaret Croke	52,483	100.0
Total votes		52,483	100.0

2020 Illinois House of Representatives Democratic primary
Party	Candidate	Votes	%
Democratic	Margaret Croke	12,380	45.85
Democratic	Jonathan A. "Yoni" Pizer (incumbent)	11,168	41.36
Democratic	James A. "Jimmy" Garfield	1,652	6.12
Democratic	Ryan Podges	1,061	3.93
Democratic	Marty Malone	741	2.74
Total votes		27,002	100.0

2018 Illinois House of Representatives election
Party	Candidate	Votes	%	±%
Democratic	Sara Feigenholtz (incumbent)	46,436	100.0	+24.41%
Total votes		46,436	100.0	

2016 Illinois House of Representatives election
Party	Candidate	Votes	%	±%
Democratic	Sara Feigenholtz (incumbent)	43,858	75.59	−24.41%
Republican	Gene Witt	14,161	24.41	N/A
Total votes		58,019	100.0	

2014 Illinois House of Representatives election
Party	Candidate	Votes	%	±%
Democratic	Sara Feigenholtz (incumbent)	25,512	100.0	+0.04%
Total votes		25,512	100.0	

2012 Illinois House of Representatives election
Party	Candidate	Votes	%	±%
Democratic	Sara Feigenholtz (incumbent)	40,397	99.96	+31.01%
Write-in		17	0.04	N/A
Total votes		40,414	100.0	

=== 2010 – 2002 ===
2010 Illinois House of Representatives election
Party	Candidate	Votes	%	±%
Democratic	Sara Feigenholtz (incumbent)	22,272	68.95	−15.48%
Republican	Dave Lenkowski	10,031	31.05	N/A
Total votes		32,303	100.0	

2008 Illinois House of Representatives election
Party	Candidate	Votes	%	±%
Democratic	Sara Feigenholtz (incumbent)	38,502	84.43	+3.30%
Green	Tim Quirk	7,100	15.57	N/A
Total votes		45,602	100.0	

2006 Illinois House of Representatives election
Party	Candidate	Votes	%	±%
Democratic	Sara Feigenholtz (incumbent)	23,749	81.13	+5.50%
Republican	Richard A. Caner	5,524	18.87	−5.50%
Total votes		29,273	100.0	

2004 Illinois House of Representatives election
Party	Candidate	Votes	%	±%
Democratic	Sara Feigenholtz (incumbent)	36,671	75.63	+1.40%
Republican	Marie-Elana Leone	11,814	24.37	−1.40%
Total votes		48,485	100.0	

2002 Illinois House of Representatives election
Party	Candidate	Votes	%	±%
Democratic	Sara Feigenholtz (incumbent)	22,448	74.23	−0.59%
Republican	Michael G. Weiler	7,793	25.77	+0.59%
Total votes		30,241	100.0	

=== 2000 – 1992 ===
2000 Illinois House of Representatives election
Party	Candidate	Votes	%	±%
Democratic	Sara Feigenholtz (incumbent)	31,706	74.82	−25.18%
Republican	Robert Huntington	10,670	25.18	N/A
Total votes		42,376	100.0	

1998 Illinois House of Representatives election
Party	Candidate	Votes	%	±%
Democratic	Sara Feigenholtz (incumbent)	19,978	100.0	+23.05%
Total votes		19,978	100.0	

1996 Illinois House of Representatives election
Party	Candidate	Votes	%	±%
Democratic	Sara Feigenholtz (incumbent)	27,659	76.95	+2.99%
Republican	Beret A. Olson	8,275	23.02	−3.02%
Write-in		8	0.02	N/A
Total votes		35,942	100.0	

1994 Illinois House of Representatives election
Party	Candidate	Votes	%	±%
Democratic	Sara Feigenholtz	16,467	73.96	+4.66%
Republican	William J. Enright	5,797	26.04	−4.66%
Total votes		22,264	100.0	

1994 Illinois House of Representatives Democratic primary
Party	Candidate	Votes	%
Democratic	Sara Feigenholtz	7,211	51.29
Democratic	Ellis B. Levin (incumbent)	6,849	48.71
Total votes		14,060	100.0

1992 Illinois House of Representatives election
Party	Candidate	Votes	%	±%
Democratic	Ellis B. Levin	30,427	69.30	−30.70%
Republican	Timothy E. Drake	13,481	30.70	N/A
Total votes		43,908	100.0	

=== 1990 – 1982 ===
1990 Illinois House of Representatives election
Party	Candidate	Votes	%	±%
Democratic	Alfred G. Ronan (incumbent)	13,928	100.0	+27.16%
Total votes		13,928	100.0	

1988 Illinois House of Representatives election
Party	Candidate	Votes	%	±%
Democratic	Alfred G. Ronan (incumbent)	18,197	72.84	+0.77%
Republican	Jacqueline Arendt	6,784	27.16	−0.77%
Total votes		24,981	100.0	

1986 Illinois House of Representatives election
Party	Candidate	Votes	%	±%
Democratic	Alfred G. Ronan (incumbent)	13,945	72.07	+7.96%
Republican	Warren W. Sikorski	5,404	27.93	−7.96%
Total votes		19,349	100.0	

1984 Illinois House of Representatives election
Party	Candidate	Votes	%	±%
Democratic	Alfred G. Ronan (incumbent)	16,361	64.11	−35.88%
Republican	Jerry Phillips	9,158	35.89	N/A
Total votes		25,519	100.0	

1982 Illinois House of Representatives election
Party	Candidate	Votes	%
Democratic	Alfred G. Ronan	19,798	99.99
Write-in		1	0.01
Total votes		19,799	100.0

=== 1970 – 1962 ===
1970 Illinois House of Representatives election
Party	Candidate	Votes	%
Republican	Paul J. Randolph (incumbent)	41,004.5	34.05
Democratic	Ira Colitz	40,675	33.78
Democratic	Robert L. Thompson (incumbent)	38,743	32.17
Write-in		1	0.00
Total votes		120,423.5	100.0

1968 Illinois House of Representatives election
Party	Candidate	Votes	%
Republican	Paul J. Randolph (incumbent)	65,937	41.38
Democratic	Edward W. Wolbank (incumbent)	47,808	30.00
Democratic	Robert L. Thompson	45,610.5	28.62
Total votes		159,355.5	100.0

1966 Illinois House of Representatives election
Party	Candidate	Votes	%
Republican	Paul J. Randolph	65,109	43.83
Democratic	Edward Wolbank	43,164	29.06
Democratic	William J. Schoeninger	40,267	27.11
Total votes		148,540	100.0

1962 Illinois House of Representatives election
Party	Candidate	Votes	%
Republican	Charles O. Miller (incumbent)	52,926.5	39.35
Democratic	Kenneth W. Course (incumbent)	42,001	31.23
Democratic	LaSalle J. Michaels (incumbent)	39,578.5	29.43
Total votes		134,506	100.0

=== 1960 – 1956 ===
1960 Illinois House of Representatives election
Party	Candidate	Votes	%
Republican	Charles O. Miller (incumbent)	60,157	36.32
Democratic	Kenneth W. Course (incumbent)	55,065	33.24
Democratic	LaSalle J. Michaels	50,416.5	30.44
Total votes		165,638.5	100.0

1958 Illinois House of Representatives election
Party	Candidate	Votes	%
Democratic	Charles H. Kordowski (incumbent)	53,693	38.99
Democratic	Kenneth W. Course (incumbent)	46,962.5	34.11
Republican	Charles O. Miller (incumbent)	37,040	26.90
Total votes		137,695.5	100.0

1956 Illinois House of Representatives election
Party	Candidate	Votes	%
Democratic	Charles H. Kordowski	54,437.5	29.86
Democratic	Kenneth W. Course	44,868	24.61
Republican	Charles O. Miller	41,803.5	22.93
Republican	Reginald J. Holzer	41,181.5	22.59
Total votes		182,290.5	100.0
