= 2026 Illinois Comptroller election =

2026 Illinois State Comptroller election
- November 3, 2026
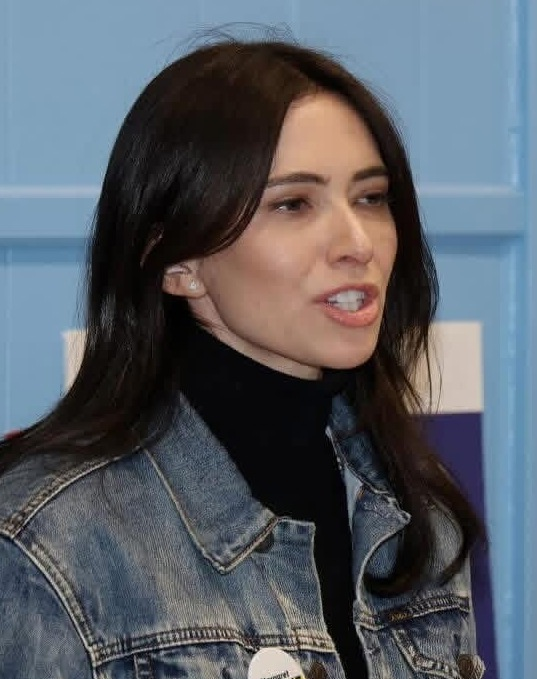

Nominee	Margaret Croke	Bryan Drew
Party	Democratic	Republican
State Comptroller before election
Susana Mendoza
Democratic
Elected State Comptroller
Margaret Croke
Democratic

The 2026 Illinois State Comptroller election took place on November 3, 2026, to elect the state comptroller of Illinois. Incumbent Democrat Susana Mendoza declined to run for a third full term.

== Democratic primary ==
=== Candidates ===
==== Nominee ====
- Margaret Croke, state representative from the 12th district (2021–present)

==== Eliminated in primary ====
- Stephanie Kifowit, state representative from the 84th district (2013–present)
- Holly Kim, Lake County Treasurer
- Karina Villa, state senator from the 25th district (2021–present)

==== Disqualified ====
- George Danos, Champaign County Auditor

==== Declined ====
- Rickey Hendon, former state senator from the 84th district (1993–2011)
- Susana Mendoza, incumbent state comptroller (endorsed Kim)

=== Endorsements ===
Margaret Croke

Executive branch officials

- Bill Daley, former White House Chief of Staff (2011–2012)

U.S. senators

- Roland Burris, former U.S. senator from Illinois (2009–2010)

U.S. representatives

- Mike Quigley, IL-05 (2009–present)

Statewide officials

- JB Pritzker, Governor of Illinois (2019–present)
- Daniel Hynes, former Illinois Comptroller (1999–2011)
- Kwame Raoul, Illinois Attorney General (2019–present)

State legislators

- Anthony DeLuca, state representative from the 80th district (2009–present)
- Sara Feigenholtz, state senator from the 6th district (2020–present)
- Angelica Guerrero-Cuellar, state representative from the 22nd district (2021–present)
- Michael Hastings, state senator from the 24th district (2019–present)
- Debbie Meyers-Martin, state representative from the 38th district (2019–present)
- Bob Morgan, state representative from the 58th district (2019–present)

Local officials

- Precious Brady-Davis, Metropolitan Water Reclamation District of Greater Chicago commissioner (2020–present)
- Red Burnett, Chicago alder from the 27th ward (2025–present)
- Walter Burnett Jr., former vice mayor of Chicago (2023–2025) and alder from the 27th ward (1995–2025)
- Deb Conroy, chair of the DuPage County Board (2022–present)
- Derrick Curtis, Chicago alder from the 18th ward (2015–present)
- John Daley, Cook County commissioner from the 11th district (1992–present)
- Bridget Degnen, Cook County commissioner from the 12th district (2018–present)
- Bridget Gainer, Cook County commissioner from the 10th district (2009–present)
- Monica Gordon, Cook County Clerk (2024–present)
- William Hall, Chigago alder from the 6th ward (2023–present)
- Bill Lowry, Cook County commissioner from the 3rd district (2018–present)
- Kisha McCaskill, Cook County commissioner from the 5th district (2025–present)
- Eileen O'Neill Burke, Cook County State's Attorney (2024–present)
- Maria Pappas, Cook County Treasurer (1998–present)
- Toni Preckwinkle, President of the Cook County Board of Commissioners (2010–present)
- Larry Rogers, Jr., Cook County Board of Review commissioner from the 3rd district (2004–present)
- Michael Scott Jr., Cook County commissioner from the 2nd district (2024–present)
- Anna Valencia, Chicago City Clerk (2017–present)
- 2 other Metropolitan Water Reclamation District of Greater Chicago commissioners

Individuals

- Lester Crown, businessman
- Jerry Reinsdorf, owner of the Chicago Bulls and Chicago White Sox

Party chapters

- Cook County Democratic Party

Labor unions

- Chicago Laborers’ District Council
- Downstate Illinois Laborers’ District Council
- International Alliance of Theatrical Stage Employees Local 476
- Illinois Pipe Trades Association
- Mid-America Carpenters Regional Council
- Plumbers and Gasfitters Local 360
- Plumbers and Pipefitters Local 25
- Plumbers & Steamfitters Local 137
- Plumbers & Tech Engineers Local 130
- Sprinkler Fitters Local 281
- Steamfitters Local 439
- United Food and Commercial Workers Local 881

Newspapers

- Chicago Tribune
Stephanie Kifowit

U.S. representatives

- Danny Davis, IL-07 (1997–present)

State legislators

- Kate Cloonen, former state representative from the 79th district (2013–2017)
- Will Davis, state representative from the 30th district (2003–present)
- Sonya Harper, state representative from the 6th district (2015–present)
- Joyce Mason, state representative from the 61st district (2019–present)
- Michelle Mussman, state representative from the 56th district (2011–present)
- Al Riley, former state representative from the 38th district (2007–2019)
- Sue Scherer, state representative from the 96th district (2013–present)

Labor unions

- Cement Masons Local 502
- Chicago Fire Fighters Union Local 2
- Chicago Fraternal Order of Police
- Illinois Federation of Public Employees Local 4408
- Illinois Fraternal Order of Police
- Illinois Painters District Councils 14, 30, and 58
- International Association of Fire Fighters Locals 99 and 4302
- National Association of Letter Carriers Branch 219
- United Steelworkers District 7
- United Steelworkers Local 17U
- United Union of Roofers, Waterproofers and Allied Workers Local 11

Organizations

- National Organization for Women PAC
- VoteVets
- With Honor Fund

Newspapers

- Daily Herald
Holly Kim

U.S. representatives

- Grace Meng, NY-06 (2013–present)
- Brad Schneider, IL-10 (2013–2015, 2017–present)
- Bobby Rush, former IL-01 (1993–2023)

Statewide officials

- Susana Mendoza, Illinois Comptroller (2016–present)

State legislators

- Lauren Beth Gash, former state representative from the 60th district (1993–2001) and Lake County Democratic chair
- Natalie Manley, state representative from the 98th district (2013–present)
- Larry Walsh, state representative from the 86th district (2012–present)

Local officials

- Jennifer Bertino-Tarrant, Will County executive (2020–present)
- Daniel Biss, mayor of Evanston (2021–present)
- Tom McNamara, mayor of Rockford (2017–present)
- David Moore, Chicago alder from the 17th ward (2015–present)
- Kevin Morrison, Cook County commissioner from the 15th district (2018–present)
- Josina Morita, Cook County commissioner from the 13th district (2022–present)

Labor unions

- American Federation of Government Employees District 7
- International Brotherhood of Teamsters Locals 301, 700, and 705
- National Association of Letter Carriers Branch 80
- United Food and Commercial Workers Local 431
Karina Villa

U.S. senators

- Bernie Sanders, U.S. senator from Vermont (2007–present)

U.S. representatives

- Jamaal Bowman, former NY-16 (2021–2025)
- Chuy Garcia, IL-04 (2019–present)
- Delia Ramirez, IL-03 (2023–present)
- Lauren Underwood, IL-14 (2019–present)

State legislators

- Bill Cunningham, president pro tempore of the Illinois Senate (2020–present) from the 18th district (2013–present)
- Don Harmon, President of the Illinois Senate (2020–present) from the 39th district (2003–present)
- Kimberly Lightford, Majority Leader of the Illinois Senate (2019–present) from the 4th district (1998–present)
- 15 other state legislators (Note: Christopher Belt, state senator from the 57th district (2019–present); Javier Cervantes, state senator from the 1st district (2022–present); Lakesia Collins, state senator from the 5th district (2023–present); Mary Edly-Allen, state senator from the 31st district (2023–present); Paul Faraci, state senator from the 52nd district (2023–present); Graciela Guzmán, state senator from the 20th district (2025–present); Mattie Hunter, state senator from the 3rd district (2003–present); Dave Koehler, state senator from the 46th district (2006–present); Laura Murphy, state senator from the 28th district (2015–present); Robert Peters, state senator from the 13th district (2019–present); Willie Preston, state senator from the 16th district (2023–present); Elgie Sims, state senator from the 17th district (2018–present); Steve Stadelman, state senator from the 34th district (2013–present); Rachel Ventura, state senator from the 43rd district (2023–present); Ram Villivalam, state senator from the 8th district (2019–present))

Labor unions

- Chicago Teachers Union
- Cook County College Teachers Union Local 1600
- Illinois Federation of Teachers
- National Association of Social Workers Illinois
- SEIU Healthcare
- Service Employees International Union Illinois State Council

Organizations

- Latino Victory Fund
- National Association of Social Workers, Illinois
- Our Revolution
Declined to endorse

Labor unions

- Chicago Federation of Labor
- Illinois AFL-CIO
- International Union of Operating Engineers Locals 150 and 399

=== Polling ===
Poll source	Date(s) administered	Sample size (Note: Key: A – all adults RV – registered voters LV – likely voters V – unclear)	Margin of error	Margaret Croke	George Danos	Stephanie Kifowit	Holly Kim	Karina Villa	Other	Undecided
Tulchin Research (D) (Note: This poll was sponsored by Villa's campaign)	November 12–17, 2025	600 (LV)	± 4.0%	6%	3%	2%	9%	8%	–	72%
Change Research (D)	October 13–17, 2025	679 (LV)	± 3.9%	3%	2%	1%	6%	7%	3% (Note: "Would not vote" with 3%)	78%

=== Results ===
Results by county Croke: 30–40%; 40–50%; Villa: 30–40%; 40–50%; Kim: 30–40%; 40–50%; 50–60%

Democratic primary results
Party	Candidate	Votes	%
Democratic	Margaret Croke	406,577	34.5
Democratic	Karina Villa	383,443	32.5
Democratic	Holly Kim	286,403	24.3
Democratic	Stephanie Kifowit	101,787	8.6
Total votes		1,178,210	100.0

== Republican primary ==
=== Candidates ===
==== Nominee ====
- Bryan Drew, attorney

=== Results ===
Republican primary results
Party	Candidate	Votes	%
Republican	Bryan Drew	499,513	100.0
Total votes		499,513	100.0

== General election ==
=== Polling ===
Poll source	Date(s) administered	Sample size	Margin of error	Margaret Croke (D)	Bryan Drew (R)	Other	Undecided
Public Policy Polling (D) (Note: Poll conducted for Chicago News Weekly.)	September 30 – October 1, 2026	569 (LV)	—	48%	37%	—	15%

=== Results ===
2026 Illinois State Comptroller election
Party	Candidate	Votes	%	±%
Democratic	Margaret Croke			
Republican	Bryan Drew			
Total votes			100.0	

== Notes ==
Partisan clients
