= Margaret Croke =

American politician

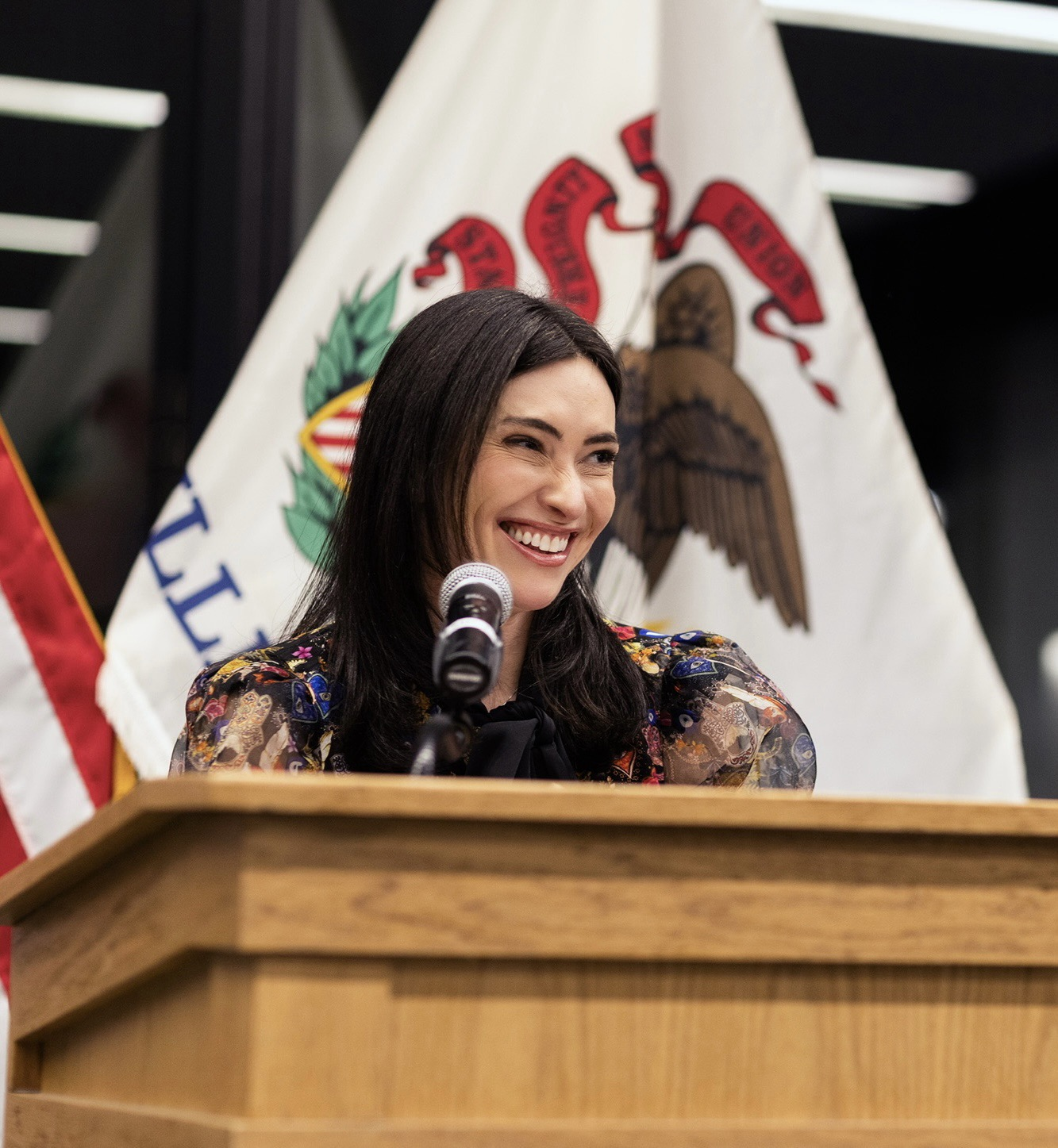
- Croke in March 2026

11th Comptroller-elect of Illinois
- Assuming office January 2027
- Governor: JB Pritzker
- Succeeding: Susana Mendoza

Member of the Illinois House of Representatives from the 12th district
- Incumbent
- Assumed office January 2, 2021
- Preceded by: Yoni Pizer

Personal details
- Born: 1991 or 1992 (age 34–35) Oak Park, Illinois, U.S.
- Party: Democratic
- Spouse: Patrick Croke
- Children: 3
- Education: University of Michigan (BA)

Margaret Croke (born 1991/1992) is an American Democratic politician who is the Comptroller-elect of Illinois. She is serving as a member of the Illinois House of Representatives, representing the 12th District. Located entirely within Chicago, the 12th District includes the neighborhoods of Lakeview East, Lincoln Park, Old Town, and Gold Coast.

Prior to her election, Croke served as Deputy Chief of Staff at the Illinois Department of Commerce and Economic Opportunity (DCEO). She also played key roles on Governor JB Pritzker's transition team and served as the statewide Women's outreach Director for Pritzker's 2018 gubernatorial campaign. She is the Democratic nominee in the 2026 Illinois Comptroller election.

== Personal life ==
Margaret Croke grew up in Oak Park, a suburb west of Chicago, and graduated from Oak Park and River Forest High School (OPRF). She earned a Bachelor of Arts in Political Science and Communications from the University of Michigan in 2014. She resides in Lincoln Park with her husband, Patrick, and their three children, PJ, Mary, and Hattie.

== Early career ==
After graduating from the University of Michigan, Croke began her career as a Project Assistant at Sidley Austin. In 2015, she became Director of Scheduling for Cook County Commissioner Bridget Gainer. She went on to serve as Illinois Regional Director for Hillary Clinton’s 2016 presidential campaign and later as executive assistant in the Office of Chicago Mayor Rahm Emanuel. In 2018, Croke was appointed Statewide Women's Outreach Director for Governor JB Pritzker’s campaign and served on his transition team following the election. She then served as Deputy Chief of Staff at the Illinois Department of Commerce and Economic Opportunity, where she oversaw key initiatives and acted as a primary liaison to the Governor's Office.

== Illinois House of Representatives (since 2021) ==
Since being sworn into the Illinois General Assembly, Croke has successfully passed legislation advocating for public safety, environmental protection, fiscal responsibility, LGBTQ+ rights, and reproductive rights. She has secured over $4 million for capital improvements in the district. She is a member of the House Democratic New Democrats Caucus, Gun Violence Prevention Caucus, Green Caucus, Jewish Caucus and Neurodiversity Caucus.

In 2021, Croke introduced legislation to expand the definition of infertility for insurance coverage to include same-sex couples, single women, and women over 35. The bill ensured broader access to fertility treatments by updating clinical definitions and prohibiting discriminatory insurance practices. The bill passed the legislature and was signed into law.

During the 103rd General Assembly, Croke advanced legislation focused on student safety and well-being. HB 3425 expanded the definition of bullying to include cyberbullying and required schools to notify parents within 24 hours of an incident. HB 4175 expanded the ban on corporal punishment to include private schools.

In the 104th General Assembly, which began in January 2025, Croke introduced HB 2456, which prohibits third-party platforms from listing or selling restaurant reservations without a written agreement, allowing restaurants to pursue legal action and imposing civil penalties for violations. Proponents of this legislation claim that it helps protect businesses from unauthorized bookings and safeguards the integrity of their reservation systems.

=== Committee Assignments ===
As of January 2025, Representative Croke is a member of the following Illinois House committees:

- Financial Institutions and Licensing (chair)
- Gaming
- Revenue and Finance
- Income Tax Subcommittee
- Property Tax Subcommittee
- Tax Policy: Income Tax Subcommittee (chair)
- Transportation: Vehicles and Safety

== 2026 Illinois Comptroller campaign ==
In July 2025, Croke announced her candidacy for Illinois Comptroller shortly after incumbent Susana Mendoza opted out from re-election. Her campaign was endorsed by Cook County Democratic Party. On March 17, 2026, Croke won the Democratic primary after defeating Karina Villa and Holly Kim.

== Other activities ==
=== Think Big America ===
Since its launch in 2023, Croke has served as Treasurer and one of three members of the Board of Directors for Think Big America a 501(c)(4) nonprofit organization founded by Illinois Governor JB Pritzker. The organization is dedicated to advancing reproductive rights by supporting the passage of abortion rights ballot measures. In 2024, Think Big America backed initiatives in key states including Nevada, Ohio, and Arizona.

=== Democratic Party of Illinois ===
Croke serves as the Democratic State Central Committeeperson for Illinois's 5th Congressional District within the Democratic Party of Illinois.

== Electoral history ==
Croke was elected to the district after defeating then-incumbent Yoni Pizer in the 2020 Democratic primary. Pizer was originally appointed to the seat after the district's long-time representative, Sara Feigenholtz, was tapped to fill former Illinois Senate President John Cullerton's vacancy in the Illinois Senate in the 6th district.

Croke was sworn into office on January 2, 2021.

Illinois 12th Representative District Democratic Primary, 2020
Party	Candidate	Votes	%
Democratic	Margaret Croke	12,380	45.85
Democratic	Jonathan A. "Yoni" Pizer (incumbent)	11,168	41.36
Democratic	James A. "Jimmy" Garfield	1,652	6.12
Democratic	Ryan Podges	1,061	3.93
Democratic	Marty Malone	741	2.74
Total votes		27,002	100.0

Illinois 12th Representative District General Election, 2020
Party	Candidate	Votes	%
Democratic	Margaret Croke	52,483	100.0
Total votes		52,483	100.0

Illinois 12th Representative District Democratic Primary, 2022
Party	Candidate	Votes	%
Democratic	Margaret Croke (incumbent)	12,360	99.89
Write-in		14	0.11
Total votes		12,374	100.0

Illinois 12th Representative District General Election, 2022
Party	Candidate	Votes	%
Democratic	Margaret Croke (incumbent)	31,332	80.20
Republican	George Kemper	7,735	19.80
Total votes		39,067	100.0

Illinois 12th Representative District Democratic Primary, 2024
Party	Candidate	Votes	%
Democratic	Margaret Croke (incumbent)	14,002	100
Write-in		0	0.0
Total votes		14,002	100.0

Illinois 12th Representative District Democratic Primary, 2024
Party	Candidate	Votes	%
Democratic	Margaret Croke (incumbent)	43,586	100
Write-in		0	0.0
Total votes		43,586	100.0

2026 Illinois Comptroller Democratic primary
Party	Candidate	Votes	%
Democratic	Margaret Croke	406,577	34.51
Democratic	Karina Villa	383,443	32.54
Democratic	Holly Kim	286,403	24.31
Democratic	Stephanie A. Kifowit	101,787	8.64
Total votes		1,178,210	100.0

Party political offices
Preceded by Susana Mendoza	Democratic nominee for Comptroller of Illinois; 2026	Most recent
