= Nancy Kaszak =

American politician

Member of the Illinois House of Representatives from the 34th district
- In office January 1993 – January 1997
- Preceded by: Alfred Ronan
- Succeeded by: Larry McKeon

Personal details
- Born: September 21, 1950 (age 76) Calumet City, Illinois
- Party: Democratic
- Spouse: Thomas W. Heaney
- Children: One
- Education: Elmhurst College (B.A.); Roosevelt University (M.P.A.); Northern Illinois University (J.D.)
- Profession: Attorney

Nancy Kaszak is an attorney and former Democratic member of the Illinois House of Representatives. She was born September 21, 1950, in Chicago Heights, Illinois. She attended Elmhurst College, Roosevelt University and Northern Illinois University College of Law.

Kaszak is a former vice president of the Chicago Council of Lawyers, was a Harold Washington appointee to the Commission on Chicago Landmarks, a leader of the Lakeview Citizens' Council, and a leader in the effort to prohibit lights at Wrigley Field.

In the 1987 aldermanic election, she received endorsements from the National Association of Women, AFSCME, IVI-IPO, and former Aldermen William Singer and Dick Simpson. She did not make it to the runoff election, in which Harold Washington ally Helen Shiller defeated incumbent Alderman Jerome Orbach.

In 1992, she ousted incumbent Alfred Ronan with the backing of Richard Mell. Her legislative committee assignments were the following: Committees on Constitutional Officers, Elections & State Government; Environment & Energy; Financial Institutions; Judiciary I. In 1993, she received Outstanding Freshman Legislator awards from the Illinois Hospital Association and the Illinois Health Care Association.

In 1996, she vacated her seat to run for the Democratic nomination in Illinois's 5th congressional district losing to future Governor of Illinois and fellow State Representative Rod Blagojevich. She ran for the seat again in 2002, this time losing to Rahm Emanuel. She endorsed Gery Chico in the 2011 mayoral election.

As of 2021, Kaszak has been the Director of the Illinois Telehealth Initiative of the Partnership for a Connected Illinois, an Illinois 501(c)(3) non-profit corporation, aimed at advancing telehealth in Illinois, the broader Midwest and the nation.
