= University of Illinois Chicago College of Pharmacy =

Pharmacy school

Coordinates: 41°52′14.0″N 87°40′14.8″W

University of Illinois Chicago Herbert M. and Carol H. Retzky College of Pharmacy
- UIC Retzky College of Pharmacy
- Type: Public pharmacy school
- Established: 1859
- Parent institution: University of Illinois Chicago
- Endowment: $12 million
- Chancellor: Marie Lynn Miranda
- President: Timothy Killeen
- Provost: Karen Colley
- Dean: Glen Schumock
- Academic staff: 200 (faculty)
- Students: 735 professional 144 graduate (MS & PhD); 29 residents and fellows
- Location: Chicago, Illinois, United States
- Campus: Chicago and Rockford
- Website: pharmacy.uic.edu

The UIC Retzky College of Pharmacy is the pharmacy school of the University of Illinois Chicago, a public research university in Chicago, Illinois, United States. It is among the oldest pharmacy schools in the United States and is the earliest established academic unit within the University of Illinois system.

== History ==
=== Early history (1859–1871) ===
The Chicago College of Pharmacy was formally established on September 12, 1859.

The American Pharmacists Association elected four Chicago druggists to membership in the society at the sixth annual meeting. After returning to Chicago, two of them, Edwin Gale and James D. Paine, began efforts to establish a formal school of pharmacy. Along with S. S. Bliss, J. H. Read, E. H. Sargent, and F. Scammon, they formed an organization that became the foundation of the college. The group also functioned as the first organized professional association of druggists in Illinois.

Notarized on September 12, 1859, the charter establishing the Chicago College of Pharmacy officially created Illinois’s first school of pharmacy and the sixth such institution in the United States. Scammon was elected chair, and E. H. Sargent was appointed to the board of trustees. The college delivered its first complete course of instruction in the winter of 1859, and its first graduating class, consisting of two students, completed their studies in 1861.

On October 8, 1871, during the Great Chicago Fire, the college’s building was destroyed along with much of the surrounding city. In the aftermath, corresponding secretary and alumnus Albert Ebert organized efforts to secure support and materials to rebuild the institution. The college reopened in 1872, enrolling 37 students in the fall term.

=== Reconstruction and professional development (1872–1895) ===
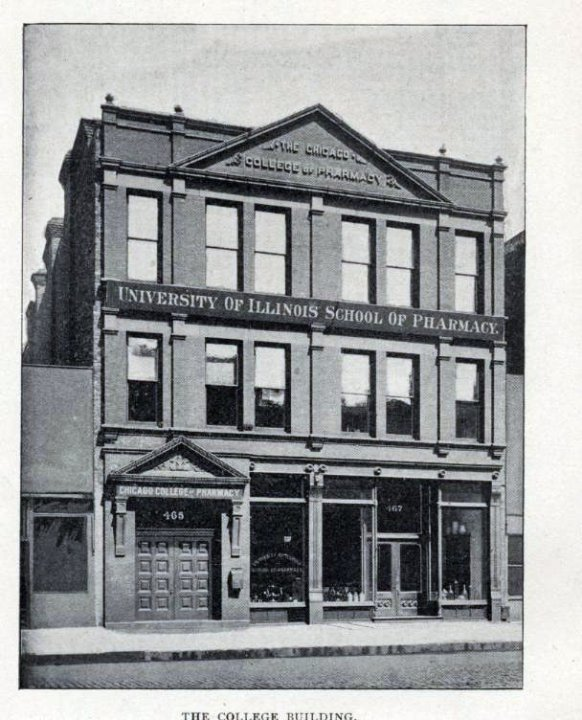
The Chicago College of Pharmacy was founded on September 12, 1859 and became part of the University of Illinois in the later part of the century.

The years that followed were crucial for both the college and the pharmacy profession. Concerns surrounding the safety and ethics of pharmacy practice emerged. Nationwide efforts were made to develop laws regulating the profession. By 1880, faculty members and alumni of the college participated in efforts that contributed to the formation of the Illinois Pharmaceutical Association (now known as the Illinois Pharmacists Association). A year later, the Pharmacy Law of 1881 was passed, mandating education requirements for the practice of pharmacy in Illinois and assigning supervision of the profession to state agencies. Candidates were required to pass an examination given by the State Board of Health. The law also required pharmacists to pay a $2 annual licensing fee.

=== Merger with the University of Illinois (1896) ===
In 1895, the state legislature amended the original charter for the University of Illinois, allowing the location of professional departments of law, medicine, dentistry, and pharmacy outside of Champaign County. On December 10, 1895, the proposal to acquire the Chicago College of Pharmacy was presented to the university's board of trustees. On May 1, 1896, the College formally united with the University of Illinois, creating the University of Illinois School of Pharmacy.

== Reputation ==
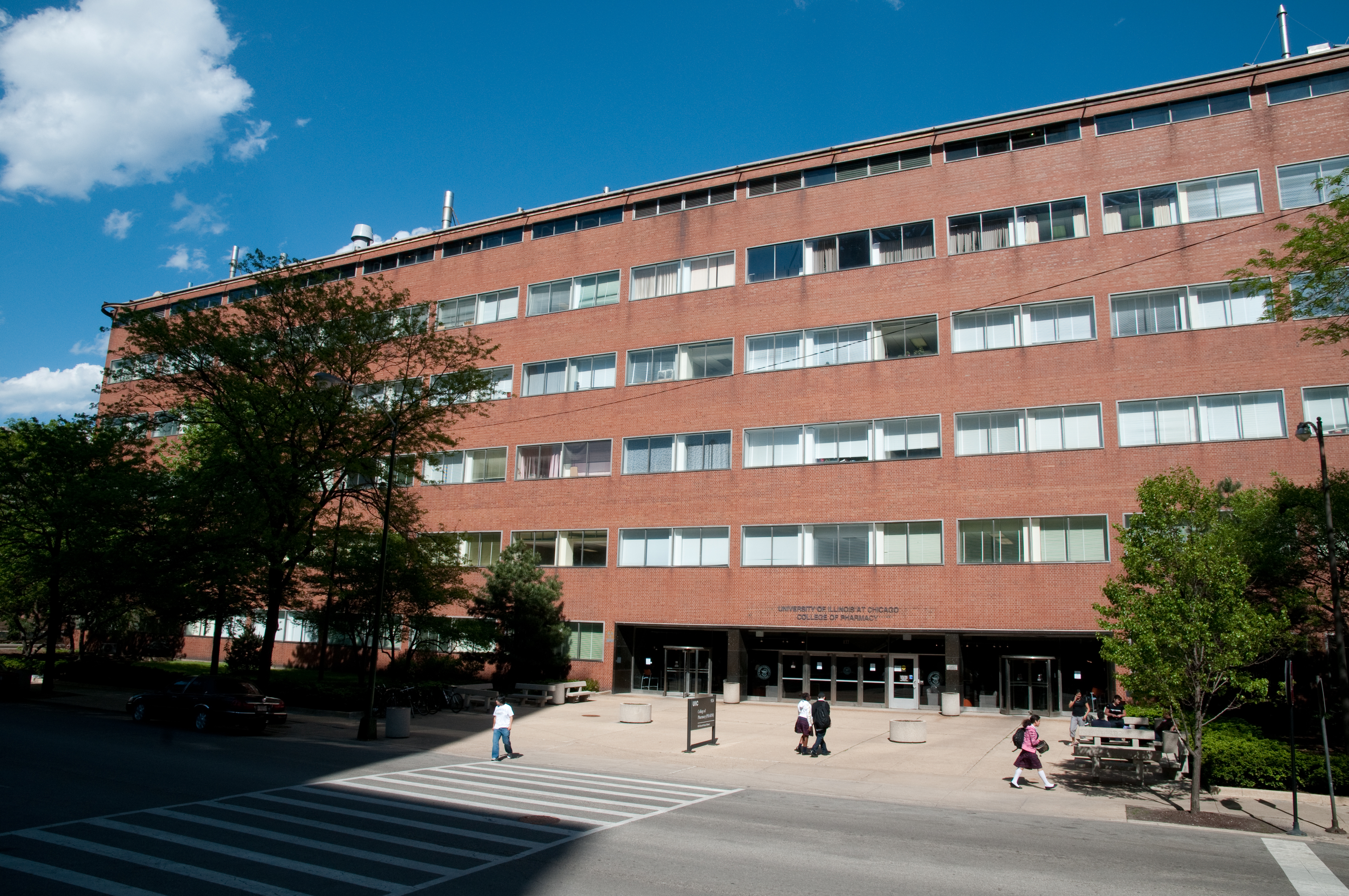
UIC College of Pharmacy at 833 South Wood Street in Chicago, Illinois, photographed in 2010

The UIC Retzky College of Pharmacy is a unit of the University of Illinois. In 2024, U.S. News & World Report listed the college among its ranked colleges of pharmacy in the United States.

As of fiscal year 2023, the UIC College of Pharmacy was among the ten highest recipients of federal research funding among U.S. colleges of pharmacy. College of Pharmacy-sponsored research programs reached $30 million in fiscal year 2010, doubling over five years.

== Admissions ==
Although not required, nearly 70 percent of applicants to the PharmD program hold a bachelor's degree before admission. To earn the PharmD, students complete a minimum of six years of study: the first two years of pre-pharmacy coursework can be accomplished at any accredited college or university; the final four years of professional education are completed at the UIC College of Pharmacy. High school students may seek admission to the College of Pharmacy through UIC's Guaranteed Professional Program Admissions initiative; the College of Pharmacy requires these students to complete their pre-pharmacy coursework at UIC before entry.

Each graduate (MS/PhD) program has its own admissions requirements and handles its own admissions process. Applicants must apply for admission to a specific program. Many graduate programs only admit candidates in the fall semester of each year.

The college offers a PharmD/PhD program, in which the professional doctor of pharmacy degree can be earned simultaneously with any of the PhDs offered. The combined program allows students to pursue both degrees concurrently. Some graduate programs allow applications to the master of science degree, usually from students who intend to continue to a PhD afterwards. The Department of Biopharmaceutical Sciences does not admit students to the MS.

== Departments ==
More than 280 research and clinical faculty members conduct research and provide training to more than 160 graduate students and postdoctoral trainees, as well as 700 professional students. Departments in the College of Pharmacy are organized around three major areas of the pharmaceutical sciences:

- Pharmacy Practice
- Pharmaceutical Sciences
- Pharmacy Systems, Outcomes, and Policy

== Centers and Institutes ==
In addition to its major departmental divisions, the college is home to several specialized research centers and institutes:

- Center for Biomolecular Sciences
- Center for Pharmacoepidemiology and Pharmacoeconomic Research
- Institute for Tuberculosis Research
- (UIC Center) University of Illinois Center for Engaging Novel Therapeutic Research Entities

== Urban Pipeline Program ==
Through its investigation of the issue of low representation of underrepresented minority students in pharmacy school, college staff and administrators concluded that the disparity was due to a lack of exposure among minority elementary and high school students to the profession. To address these issues, the college and the Chicago Public Schools Department of College and Career Preparation partnered with industry leaders to offer a comprehensive pharmacy program for high school students, the Urban Pipeline Program. It is an eight-week summer program that includes academic instruction, experiential learning, and mentoring to provide academic and experiential exposure to pharmacy-related careers.

== Notable alumni ==
- Arthur A. Telcser, pharmacist and Speaker of the Illinois House of Representatives
