= Ellis B. Levin =

American politician

Ellis B. Levin (born April 10, 1945) is a politician who served two nonconsecutive tenures (1977-1979 and 1981-1995) as a Democratic member of the Illinois House of Representatives.

== Biography ==
Ellis was born April 10, 1945. He graduated from the University of Chicago and Northwestern University School of Law. He served as a research assistant to Joseph Tydings, legislative policy officer for the United States Department of Housing and Urban Development and a legislative assistant to Leonard Farbstein. In 1973, he moved to Edgewater and began to work for the Cook County State's Attorney. In 1976, he was one of three individuals elected to the Illinois House of Representatives from the 12th district along with William A. Marovitz and Arthur A. Telcser. He did not run for reelection in 1978 and was succeeded by John Cullerton. In 1980, he ran again and succeeded Marovitz who successfully ran for the Illinois Senate. After the Cutback Amendment eliminated multimember districts in favor of single member districts, Levin ran in and won the 5th district. He was handily reelected five times before losing the Democratic nomination to Sara Feigenholtz.

During his legislative career, he was an active member of IVI-IPO serving as general counsel and chair for the Near North Side chapter. He has been named the IVI-IPO Best Legislator of the Year for every term in office beginning in 1980. He was the recipient of the ERA Leadership Award in 1982 and was recognized one year later by the Illinois Human Relations Association. In addition, he has been awarded the Illinois Pro-Choice Sylvia Award and the Glynn Sudbery Public Service Award. He was a National Executive Committee and National Board member for Americans for Democratic Action.

Preceded by Al Ronan (district renumbered)	Member of the Illinois House of Representatives from the 12th district 1993-1995	Succeeded by Sara Feigenholtz
Preceded by District created	Member of the Illinois House of Representatives from the 12th district 1983-1993	Succeeded by Lovana Jones (district renumbered)
Preceded by William A. Marovitz	Member of the Illinois House of Representatives from the 12th district 1981-1983; With: John Cullerton and Art Telcser	Succeeded by District abolished
Preceded by John Merlo	Member of the Illinois House of Representatives from the 12th district 1977-1979; With: William Marovitz and Art Telcser	Succeeded by John Cullerton
