= Northern Illinois University College of Law =

Public law school in Chicago, Illinois, US

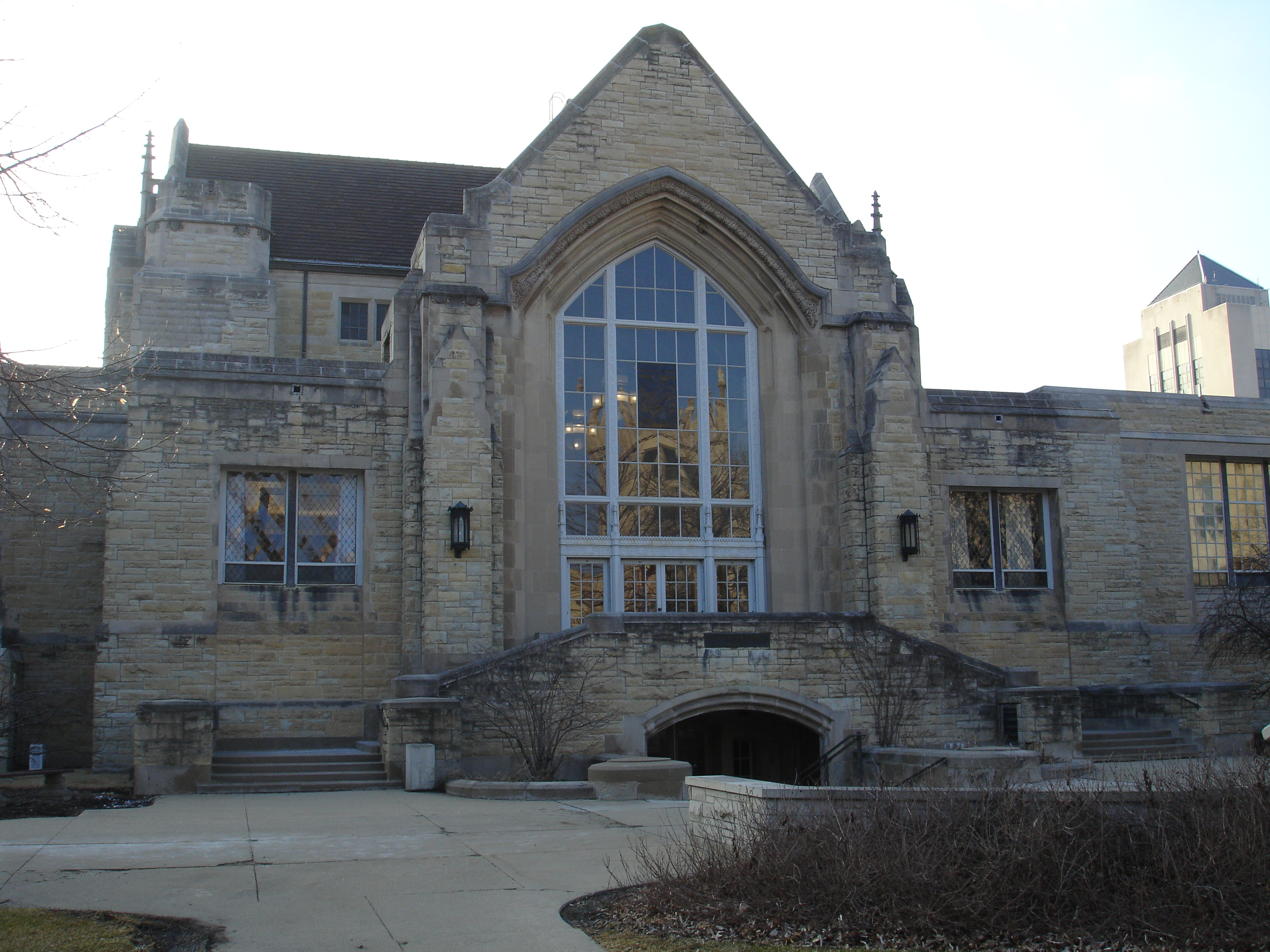
- Swen Parson Hall
- Established: 1975
- School type: Public
- Dean: Cassandra Hill
- Location: DeKalb, Illinois, U.S. 41°56′03″N 88°45′55″W
- Enrollment: 279
- Faculty: 27
- USNWR ranking: 161st (tie) (2026)
- Bar pass rate: 86.57% (ABA ultimate bar passage rate)
- Website: law.niu.edu
- ABA profile

Northern Illinois University College of Law (NIU Law) is one of four public law schools in the U.S. state of Illinois. It is one of two public law schools in the Chicago area. The College of Law was founded as the Lewis University College of Law in Glen Ellyn, Illinois, in 1975. It became part of Northern Illinois University in August 1979, and in 1982 moved to the DeKalb, Illinois, campus, taking up residence in Swen Parson Hall, the former NIU main library. The College of Law offers the Juris Doctor degree.

According to NIU Law's 2019 ABA-required disclosures, 78% of the Class of 2019 obtained full-time, long-term, bar passage-required employment nine months after graduation (76% when excluding sole practitioners). According to the National Association of Law Placement employment report, 93.9% of the NIU Law Class of 2019 were employed as of ten months after graduation.

== Employment ==
According to NIU Law's 2019 ABA-required disclosures, 78% of the Class of 2019 obtained full-time, long-term, bar passage-required employment nine months after graduation (76% when excluding sole practitioners). Nine months after graduation, 84% of the NIU Law Class of 2019 was employed in full-time, long-term, J.D. advantage, bar passage required, or professional positions. According to the National Association of Law Placement employment report, 93.9% of the NIU Law Class of 2019 were employed as of ten months after graduation. NIU Law's Law School Transparency under-employment score is 14.5%, indicating the percentage of the Class of 2019 unemployed, pursuing an additional degree, or working in a non-professional, short-term, or part-time job nine months after graduation.

== Costs ==
The cost of tuition and fees at the NIU College of Law for the 2020–2021 academic year is $22,082 for all U.S. residents, whether in-state or out-of-state. Law School Transparency estimated debt-financed cost of attendance for three years for students starting in 2019 is $154,146. The average debt load for graduates in the Class of 2018 who borrowed at least one loan was $95,247. The national average debt load for law students in 2017 was $112,776. Students can obtain financial assistance through the university and law school in the form of research and graduate assistantships, the latter of which typically provides a full tuition waiver as well as a stipend.

== Legal skills training ==
In the first three semesters of law school, NIU College of Law students take a pair of two-semester required courses, Basic Legal Research and Legal Writing and Advocacy. The two courses employ coordinated, real-life exercises. In Basic Legal Research, students learn to use both print and computer-assisted legal research tools. Students analyze a factual situation in order to develop a legal research strategy and learn how to locate and use secondary sources, case law, statutory and legislative history material, and administrative regulations. In Legal Writing and Advocacy, students develop skills through a series of intensive writing exercises culminating in an oral argument.

In Introduction to Lawyering Skills, students learn skills and techniques essential to the pretrial phase of a civil or criminal lawsuit. The course involves simulated experiences, including role-playing and videotaping, to provide immediacy of experience and direct feedback.

== Clinics and Experiential Education ==
Various clinical experiences are offered each semester at the Clinical Law Center on the DeKalb campus and the Zeke Giorgi Legal Clinic in Rockford, Illinois. In addition, in 2013 the College of Law began a clinical partnership with Hesed House and Aunt Martha's Health Center in Aurora, Illinois that focuses on the legal issues that may contribute to health problems in the area’s indigent population.

=== Clinical opportunities ===
- Civil Justice Clinic
- Criminal Defense Clinic
- Health Advocacy Clinic

=== Prisoners' Rights Project ===
The Prisoners' Rights Project was initiated in 2018 in partnership with the P. Michael Mahoney Chapter of the Federal Bar Association. Over the course of two semesters, third-year students represent prisoners in federal court who have alleged that their constitutional rights have been violated. Each case is chosen with the expectation that it will culminate in a federal jury trial where the students will be lead counsel.

== Public interest service ==
In 2017, law.com recognized NIU College of Law as one of the top law schools for delivering graduates to public service careers. and in 2015 preLaw recognized NIU Law specifically in the category of best schools for prosecutors/public defenders.

According to U.S. News & World Report, over one third of the class of 2017 chose a career in public interest or government. As of 2019 there are over 100 alumni in the judiciary.

In 2001, the college received the Excellence in Pro Bono and Public Interest Service Award.

== Leadership ==
Cassandra Hill became dean of the Northern Illinois University College of Law on July 1, 2020. Prior to joining NIU Law, Dean Hill served as an administrator and faculty member at Thurgood Marshall School of Law at Texas Southern University. Most recently she served as the associate dean for academic affairs. She also was appointed by the then-university president to serve on a three-member leadership team with the law school’s acting dean. In addition, she held positions as associate dean for research and faculty development and director of legal writing. Dean Hill received her J.D. from Howard University School of Law and graduated with a B.A. in Mathematics and Spanish from the University of Virginia, where she was elected to the Phi Beta Kappa Honor Society. After graduating from law school, she served as a federal law clerk for the Honorable Vanessa D. Gilmore, United States District Court for the Southern District of Texas, and she practiced with the law firm of Baker Botts L.L.P. in the Tax/Employee Benefits section. Dean Hill then began her teaching career at UCLA School of Law.

Yolanda M. King became the associate dean for academic affairs of the NIU College of Law in May 2020. Dean King teaches property, intellectual property law related courses and entertainment law. Before joining the NIU faculty, Dean King practiced intellectual property law at Husch Blackwell Sanders Welsh & Katz and Brinks Hofer Gilson & Lione in Chicago, Illinois, where she engaged in domestic and international copyright and trademark prosecution, handled licensing issues and represented clients in domain name matters. In addition, she was an attorney in the City of Chicago Department of Law.

Kathleen Coles became the associate dean for student affairs of the NIU College of Law in 2013. She has taught Corporations, Securities Regulation, Non-Profit Organizations, Payment Systems, and Introduction to Lawyering Skills, along with seminars dealing with financial crises. Before joining the NIU faculty, Dean Coles practiced law for fourteen years in New York, Washington, D.C., and Los Angeles.

== Rankings and awards ==
In 2018, NIU College of Law received the Warren Wolfson Excellence in Education Award from the Lawyers' Assistance Program for its dedication to improving the well-being of its students and for promoting the Illinois Lawyers’ Assistance Program within its community. NIU College of Law’s Civil Justice Clinic received the Illinois State Bar Association’s Excellence in Legal Education award the same year.

In 2017, NIU College of Law was named by Law.com as the number five law school in the nation for placing graduates in government and public interest jobs. It was also named to National Jurist’s "Best Value Law School" list (adding to previous "Best Value Law School" awards in 2016, 2015, 2013 and 2010).

In 2016, National Jurist magazine ranked the NIU College of Law eleventh in the nation in graduates being hired by firms with 100 or fewer attorneys, making it one of the best law schools in the nation at landing its graduates into small-firm practices. In the category of public service, NIU College of Law was named by National Jurist and preLaw magazines as a best school for public service careers and was also named by the National Law Journal as one of the top law schools for delivering graduates to public service careers. NIU College of Law was also named by preLaw magazine as one of the top 40 law schools in the United States for bar preparation.

In 2015, the NIU College of Law earned several accolades for employment. Law School Transparency rated the employment prospects for graduates of the NIU College of Law as the fourth-best among Illinois-based law schools. Also in 2015, NIU College of Law was ranked in the top 100 in employment and was listed by National Jurist magazine as one of only thirty-eight law schools in the nation experiencing double-digit improvements in graduate employment rates from the previous year. Other awards and rankings in 2015 included being named as one of the best schools for "Small Law" by National Jurist and preLaw magazines, and as one of the ten "most underrated law schools" when using median LSAT scores and employment outcomes.

Rankings and awards for student and faculty diversity at NIU College of Law include: a top 50 national ranking for diversity from preLaw and National Jurist magazines in 2015; being named a top five regional law school for Latina/o students by Lawyers of Color in 2014; and being named a top five regional law school for Black students in the 2014 edition of the Lawyers of Color Black Student’s Guide to Law Schools. NIU College of Law was ranked in the top ten for most diverse law faculty by The Princeton Review in 2008 and 2009 and was recognized for its diversity initiatives by the Hispanic Lawyers Association of Illinois in 2009. In 2007, the Council on Legal Education Opportunity (CLEO) presented NIU Law with its annual Diversity Award in recognition of the college’s continued commitment to diversifying the legal profession, marking the fourth time the NIU College of Law received this honor.

== History ==
The NIU College of Law was founded as the Lewis University College of Law on November 2, 1974. Due to a lack of funding to meet ABA requirements, the Lewis University administration began looking for an institution to transfer the law school to. Administrators from both NIU and Lewis University initially met in 1978 to discuss the transfer of the law school from Lewis University to NIU. Although there had been talk for quite some time of establishing a law school at NIU there had yet to be any real progress made. NIU and Lewis University began working on a proposal to submit to the Illinois Board of Higher Education (IBHE) in 1979. The IBHE rejected the proposal necessitating legislative action.

Illinois Senators David C. Shapiro and Philip J. Rock introduced Senate Bill 719 on April 12, 1979, to the Illinois Senate. Senate Bill 719 provided the legislation necessary for the law school transfer of jurisdiction from Lewis University to NIU and funding to support the law school at NIU. After passing in the Illinois General Assembly, Senate Bill 719 was approved by Governor Thompson on June 26, 1979 and signed into law as Public Act 81–37 the next day. Effective August 1, 1979, Lewis University College of Law would become Northern Illinois University College of Law. In the Fall of 1982, after more than seven years in Glen Ellyn, the NIU College of Law moved into its newly remodeled space within Swen Parson Hall on NIU’s main campus in DeKalb, IL. On August 11, 1982, the American Bar Association gave full accreditation to the NIU College of Law. The College of Law was admitted to the American Association of Law Schools on January 22, 1985.

== Alumni ==
Notable members of the Illinois General Assembly who graduated from the NIU College of Law include Representative Steven Andersson and State Senators John Curran and Toi Hutchinson. Nancy Kaszak, a Democratic member of the Illinois House of Representatives from 1993–1997 is also an alumna. State legislators outside of Illinois who graduated from NIU's College of Law include Holly Grange, Michael D. Smigiel Sr., and John Olumba. Local politicians Alderman Howard Brookins, former Alderman Robert Fioretti and former Clerk James Laski all graduated from the College of Law, the latter two graduated together in the Class of 1978.

As of 2017, thirteen of the 102 elected Illinois State's Attorneys are alumni of the NIU College of Law; Brian Bower of Coles County, Mark Isaf of Edgar County, Colby Hathaway of Henderson County, John Hay of Jo Daviess County, Eric Weis of Kendall County, Karen Donnelly of LaSalle County, Randy Yedinak of Livingston County, Jennifer Watson of Macoupin County, Meeghan Lee of Mercer County, Christina Mennie of Putnam County, Stewart Umholtz of Tazewell County, James Glasgow of Will County, and Greg Minger of Woodford County.

Kathleen Zellner, noted for exonerating prison inmates, graduated from the law school.

Chel Diokno, founding Dean of Tañada-Diokno College of Law in the Philippines studied law at NIU College of Law and finished near the top of his class with magna cum laude honors.
