= Larry McKeon =

American politician (1944–2008)

Member of the Illinois House of Representatives from the 13th district 34th district (1997-2003)
- In office January 1997 – December 1, 2006
- Preceded by: Nancy Kaszak
- Succeeded by: Greg Harris

Personal details
- Born: June 30, 1944 Nampa, Idaho, U.S.
- Died: May 13, 2008 (aged 63) Springfield, Illinois, U.S.
- Party: Democratic

Larry McKeon (June 30, 1944 – May 13, 2008) was an American politician who served as a member of the Illinois House of Representatives from Chicago. Serving from January 1997 to January 2007, he was the first-ever openly gay member of the Illinois General Assembly and was also HIV-positive.

== Early life and career ==
McKeon was born June 30, 1944, in Nampa, Idaho. He held degrees from California State University at Los Angeles and completed some doctoral work at the University of Chicago. He was a first lieutenant in the United States Army and a lieutenant with the Los Angeles County Sheriff's Department before moving to Chicago.

In 1991, his longtime partner, Ray Korzinski, was diagnosed with AIDS, dying just 12 weeks later.

== Illinois House of Representatives ==
McKeon was elected to the House in 1996 from a Chicago district then-numbered the 34th and was sworn in the following January. He served on the committees on Labor, Aging, and several other subjects. During the 2002 redistricting, his district became the 13th.

McKeon was inducted into the Chicago Gay and Lesbian Hall of Fame in 1997.

In July 2006, he announced his intention to retire from the legislature at the end of his term in January 2007. As he had already won the March 2006 Democratic primary election without opposition and thus had become the party's nominee for re-election, it fell to the five Democratic ward committeemen in his district to select a replacement nominee. They selected the openly gay (and openly HIV-positive) Greg Harris. The Republicans failed to select an opponent. McKeon opted to retire earlier than planned and resigned effective December 1, 2006. Greg Harris, the winner of the 2006 general election, was appointed by local Democratic leaders and sworn into office the same day.

== Death and legacy ==
McKeon died on May 13, 2008, aged 63, in Springfield, Illinois, after suffering a stroke. Following his death, numerous political figures issued statements praising his life and achievements, including U.S. Sen. Barack Obama, Illinois Gov. Rod Blagojevich and Howard Dean, chairman of the Democratic National Committee. Many of McKeon's campaigns won the backing of the Gay & Lesbian Victory Fund.
