= Yoni Pizer =

American politician

"Yoni" Pizer

Member of the Illinois House of Representatives from the 12th district
- In office February 9, 2020 – December 31, 2020
- Preceded by: Sara Feigenholtz
- Succeeded by: Margaret Croke

Personal details
- Party: Democratic
- Education: University of Wisconsin (B.A.); Northwestern University (M.B.A.)

Jonathan A. "Yoni" Pizer is a former Democratic member of the Illinois House from the 12th district from his appointment on February 9, 2020, to December 31, 2020. The 12th district includes parts of the Chicago neighborhoods of Lake View, Lincoln Park, Near North Side, and Uptown.

== Early life ==
Pizer earned a bachelor's degree in economics from the University of Wisconsin–Madison and an MBA from the Kellogg School of Management at Northwestern University.

== Political career ==
He served as a community liaison for Illinois congressman Mike Quigley.

Pizer was appointed to the Illinois House to fill the seat vacated by Sara Feigenholtz, who left the seat to join the Illinois Senate. His appointment was controversial, as his appointment came just 38 days before the general primary. He ran to the keep the seat in the Democratic Party primary, garnering an endorsement from Chicago mayor Lori Lightfoot. He was defeated in the primary by fellow Democratic challenger Margaret Croke.

On December 30, 2020, Pizer announced his resignation to be effective the next day, saying that he was "leaving office because of the State’s policy to effectively terminate health insurance for me and my family on 12/31/20, even though my term ends on January 13, 2021", returning to his prior position as community liaison in Congressman Quigley's office.

== Electoral history ==
Illinois 12th State House District Democratic Primary, 2020
Party	Candidate	Votes	%
Democratic	Margaret Croke	12,380	45.85
Democratic	Jonathan A. "Yoni" Pizer (incumbent)	11,168	41.36
Democratic	James A. "Jimmy" Garfield	1,652	6.12
Democratic	Ryan Podges	1,061	3.93
Democratic	Marty Malone	741	2.74
Total votes		27,002	100.0
