= Sara Feigenholtz =

American politician (born 1956)

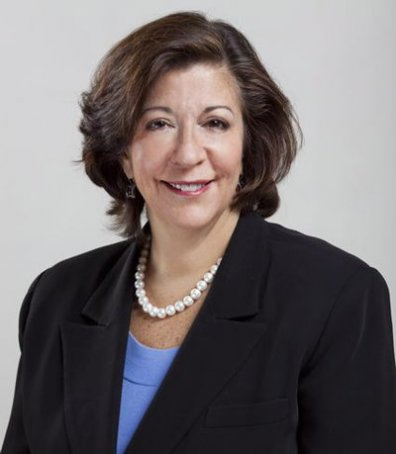

Member of the Illinois Senate from the 6th district
- Incumbent
- Assumed office January 21, 2020
- Preceded by: John Cullerton

Member of the Illinois House of Representatives from the 12th district
- In office January 11, 1995 – January 21, 2020
- Preceded by: Ellis B. Levin
- Succeeded by: Yoni Pizer

Personal details
- Born: December 11, 1956 (age 69) Chicago, Illinois, U.S.
- Party: Democratic
- Education: Northeastern Illinois University (BA)

Sara Feigenholtz (born December 11, 1956) is a Democratic member of the Illinois Senate who has represented the 6th district since 2020. The district includes the lakefront Chicago neighborhoods of Lake View, Lincoln Park, and the Near North Side. From 1995 to 2020, she was a member of the Illinois House of Representatives representing the 12th district.

== Background ==
Sara Feigenholtz's political interests and activity, notably in the areas of adoption, women's issues and health care, reflect her personal experience and family background. Her adoptive mother, Florence Buky, an immigrant from Białystok, Poland (occupied by Russia at the time), worked her way through medical school to become a general practitioner. Many of Dr. Buky's patients were unable to care for their children and this was how she came to adopt Sara and her brother. Feigenholz attributes the origin of her political commitment to health care as a basic right to the childhood experience of patients calling to see Dr. Buky at the family home in Lake View, Chicago, and her mother never turning anyone away, even those unable to pay.

Feigenholtz earned her bachelor's degree in political science and speech and performing arts from Northeastern Illinois University In 2011, she completed the Senior Executives in State and Local Government Program at Harvard Kennedy School.

She worked as Chief of Staff to State Representative John Cullerton before becoming a fund-raiser for progressive causes.

== Illinois House of Representatives ==
Feigenholtz was elected to her first term as state representative of Illinois’ 12th District in 1994, defeating long-standing incumbent Ellis B. Levin. She chose to focus her attention on health care and human services reform. She was a lead sponsor of the Family Health Care Bill. She also campaigned for the introduction of the All Kids program.

In 2010, she sponsored the Original Birth Certificate Access Bill, allowing for the release of the original birth certificate to an adopted person upon written request, provided he or she is over the age of 21.

As part of the Affordable Care Act implementation, Feigenholtz sponsored the 2013 expansion of Medicaid in Illinois. This legislation extended coverage to thousands of Illinoisans who were shut out of the health care system before.

In 2017, Feigenholtz sponsored House Bill 40 in the 100th General Assembly, kept abortion legal in Illinois despite Roe v. Wade being overturned by the Supreme Court of the United States. It also extends insurance coverage of abortion to state employees and women insured through Medicaid.

Sara Feigenholtz served as Assistant Majority Leader from 2013 through 2019. She currently chairs the Adoption & Child Welfare Committee, and most recently served on the Appropriations-Human Services, Tourism, Hospitality and Craft, Mental Health, Environment, and Energy Committees.

In 2018, Democrat J. B. Pritzker appointed Feigenholtz a member of the gubernatorial transition's Healthy Children and Families Committee.

In 2025, Feigenholtz wrote and passed House Bill 1560, which created a pathway for schools to implement a standardized mental health screening for youth starting as early as third grade.

== Special congressional election ==
Feigenholtz came in third place to Mike Quigley in Illinois's 5th congressional district special election, 2009 to fill the district seat vacated by Rahm Emanuel, who resigned to serve as President Barack Obama's Chief of Staff.

== Illinois Senate ==
Feigenholtz assumed the office of State Senator for Illinois' 6th District on January 21, 2020.

Feigenholtz was a guest of U.S. Representative Mike Quigley at Joe Biden's 2023 State of the Union Address.

=== Committees ===
In the 102nd General Assembly, Feigenholtz was the Chair of the Appropriations - Human Services Committee; the Tourism and Hospitality Committee; and the Redistricting - Chicago North Committee. She also served on the Senate Appropriations - Business Regulations and Labor Committee; Behavioral and Mental Health Committee; Health Committee; Insurance Committee; Licensed Activities Committee; Pensions Committee; Subcommittee on Children & Family; and the Subcommittee on Medicaid.

In the 103rd General Assembly, she is the Chair of the Financial Institutions Committee. She also serves on the Appropriations Committee; Appropriations - Health and Human Services Committee; Behavioral and Mental Health Committee; Licensed Activities Committee; and Revenue Committee.

== Other ==
In 2001 Feigenholtz was inducted into the Chicago Gay and Lesbian Hall of Fame as a Friend of the Community.

== Controversy ==
Feigenholtz has been involved in controversies related to social media posts concerning religious groups. In July 2022, Feigenholtz posted an image on Facebook showing a figure resembling a Catholic cleric pointing a gun at a pregnant Statue of Liberty, following the Supreme Court's decision in Dobbs v. Jackson Women's Health Organization. The Archdiocese of Chicago criticized the post as "bigoted imagery" and called for a "more fulsome explanation and apology." Feigenholtz removed the post and apologized, stating she "meant no ill will toward anyone who found it offensive."

In late October 2024, Feigenholtz posted on X (formerly Twitter) in response to a comment about Islam, writing that those who praise the religion should "move to an Islamic country and stick their heads in the dirt multiple times a day for enlightenment." In November 2024, the Council on American-Islamic Relations (CAIR) and other groups called for her resignation. High school teacher Fuzia Jarad additionally alleged that Feigenholtz made anti-Muslim comments during a personal conversation, which Feigenholtz denied as "false and without merit." CAIR requested that Senate President Don Harmon remove Feigenholtz from committee leadership positions.

== Electoral history ==
Illinois 12th State House District General Election, 1994
Party	Candidate	Votes	%
Democratic	Sara Feigenholtz	16,467	73.96
Republican	William J. Enright	5,797	26.04
Total votes		22,264	100.0

Illinois 12th State House District General Election, 1996
Party	Candidate	Votes	%
Democratic	Sara Feigenholtz (incumbent)	27,659	76.97
Republican	Beret A. Olson	8,275	23.03
Total votes		35,934	100.0

Illinois 12th State House District General Election, 1998
Party	Candidate	Votes	%
Democratic	Sara Feigenholtz (incumbent)	19,978	100.0
Total votes		19,978	100.0

Illinois 12th State House District General Election, 2000
Party	Candidate	Votes	%
Democratic	Sara Feigenholtz (incumbent)	31,706	74.82
Republican	Robert Huntington	10,670	25.18
Total votes		42,376	100.0

Illinois 12th State House District General Election, 2002
Party	Candidate	Votes	%
Democratic	Sara Feigenholtz (incumbent)	22,448	74.23
Republican	Michael G. Weiler	7,793	25.77
Total votes		30,241	100.0

Illinois 12th State House District General Election, 2004
Party	Candidate	Votes	%
Democratic	Sara Feigenholtz (incumbent)	36,671	75.63
Republican	Marie-Elana Leone	11,814	24.37
Total votes		48,485	100.0

Illinois 12th State House District General Election, 2006
Party	Candidate	Votes	%
Democratic	Sara Feigenholtz (incumbent)	23,749	81.13
Republican	Richard A. Caner	5,524	18.87
Total votes		29,273	100.0

Illinois 12th State House District General Election, 2008
Party	Candidate	Votes	%
Democratic	Sara Feigenholtz (incumbent)	38,502	84.43
Green	Tim Quirk	7,100	15.57
Total votes		45,602	100.0

Illinois 5th Congressional District Democratic Special Primary, 2009
Party	Candidate	Votes	%
Democratic	Mike Quigley	12,118	22.37
Democratic	John A. Fritchey	9,835	17.89
Democratic	Sara Feigenholtz	9,194	16.72
Democratic	Victor A. Forys	6,428	11.69
Democratic	Patrick J. O'Connor	6,388	11.62
Democratic	Charles J. Wheelan	3,681	6.69
Democratic	Tom Geoghegan	3,342	6.08
Democratic	Paul J. Bryar	1,111	2.02
Democratic	Jan H. Donatelli	892	1.62
Democratic	Frank Annunzio	755	1.37
Democratic	Cary Capparelli	714	1.30
Democratic	Carlos A. Monteagudo	521	0.95
Democratic	Roger A. Thompson III	10	0.02
Total votes		54,989	100.0

Illinois 12th State House District General Election, 2010
Party	Candidate	Votes	%
Democratic	Sara Feigenholtz (incumbent)	22,272	68.95
Republican	Dave Lenkowski	10,031	31.05
Total votes		32,303	100.0

Illinois 12th State House District General Election, 2012
Party	Candidate	Votes	%
Democratic	Sara Feigenholtz (incumbent)	40,397	99.96
Write-in votes	Frank Rowder	17	0.04
Total votes		40,414	100.0

Illinois 12th State House District General Election, 2014
Party	Candidate	Votes	%
Democratic	Sara Feigenholtz (incumbent)	25,512	100.0
Total votes		25,512	100.0

Illinois 12th State House District General Election, 2016
Party	Candidate	Votes	%
Democratic	Sara Feigenholtz (incumbent)	43,858	75.59
Republican	Gene Witt	14,161	24.41
Total votes		58,019	100.0

Illinois 12th State House District General Election, 2018
Party	Candidate	Votes	%
Democratic	Sara Feigenholtz (incumbent)	46,346	100.0
Total votes		46,346	100.0
