= Stephanie Kifowit =

American politician (born 1971)

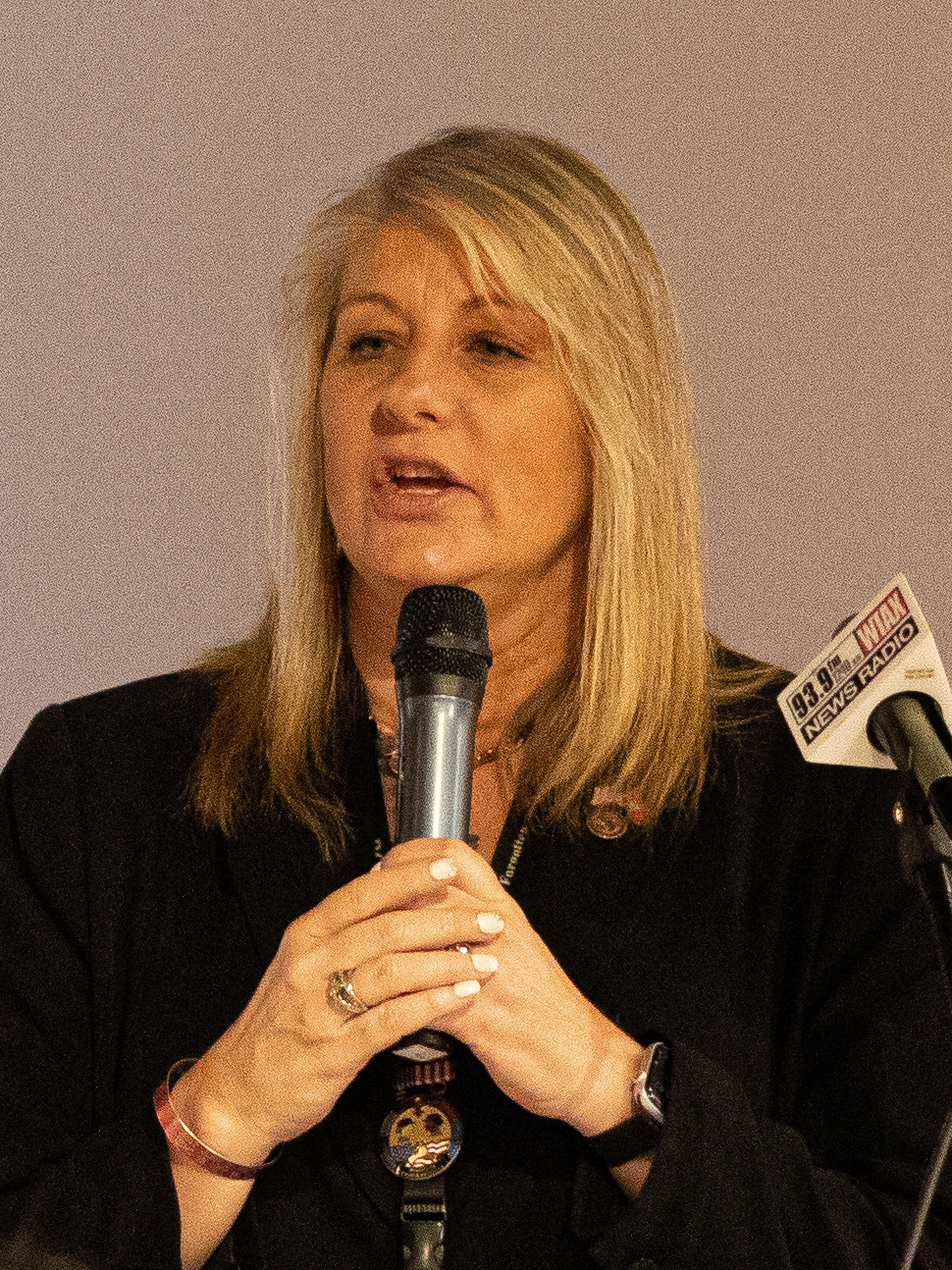
- Kifowit speaking in 2023

Member of the Illinois House of Representatives from the 84th district
- Incumbent
- Assumed office January 2013
- Preceded by: Tom Cross (redistricted)

Personal details
- Born: November 2, 1971 (age 54)
- Party: Democratic
- Spouse: Steve Kifowit
- Education: Northern Illinois University
- Profession: Registered Financial Adviser

Military service
- Allegiance: United States
- Branch/service: U.S. Marine Corps
- Rank: Corporal

Stephanie Kifowit (born November 2, 1971) is the Illinois state representative for the 84th district, which includes all or parts of Aurora, Boulder Hill, Montgomery, Naperville, and Oswego. Kifowit is a veteran of the U.S. Marine Corps, a former substitute teacher, and previously served as an alderman in the city of Aurora. She is currently serving on the Healthcare Licensing, Financial Institutions, Intermodal Transportation, General Services Appropriation – Vice Chairman, and Business Growth Committees for the 99th General Assembly.

Kifowit graduated with a Bachelor of Science in political science and a Masters of Public Administration from Northern Illinois University.

In 2018, Kifowit was appointed to Governor-elect J. B. Pritzker's transition committee on Veterans Affairs.

As of July 3, 2022, Representative Kifowit is a member of the following Illinois House committees:

- Appropriations - General Service Committee (HAPG)
- Income Tax Subcommittee (HREF-INTX)
- (Chairwoman of) Operations Subcommittee (HSGA-OPER)
- (Chairwoman of) Procurement Subcommittee (HSGA-PROC)
- Public Utilities Committee (HPUB)
- Revenue & Finance Committee (HREF)
- (Chairwoman of) State Government Administration Committee (HSGA)
- (Chairwoman of) Veterans' Affairs Committee (HVET)
- Water Subcommittee (HPUB-WATR)

Kifowitz ran for the Democratic nomination for Comptroller in the 2026 election, placing fourth of four candidates based on election night results. It was announced that Kifowit would become the executive director of the Construction Industry Service Corporation, a labor-management organization serving union building trades and contractors.
