= Bruce L. Douglas =

American politician (1925–2025)

Member of the Illinois House of Representatives from the 11th district
- In office 1971–1972

Member of the Illinois House of Representatives from the 12th district
- In office 1972–1974

Personal details
- Born: July 14, 1925 New York City, U.S.
- Died: May 4, 2025 (aged 99) Riverwoods, Illinois, U.S.
- Education: New York University; Princeton University
- Occupation: Dentist

Bruce Lee Douglas (July 14, 1925 – May 4, 2025) was an American politician in the state of Illinois.

== Life and career ==
Douglas was born in New York City, New York on July 14, 1925. He received bachelor, doctorate and masters degrees, and professional diplomas from Princeton University, Columbia University, New York University, and the University of California. He served as an intern and resident at Queens Hospital Center in Jamaica, New York from 1948-1949 and 1951-1952. He was a retired Diplomate of the American Board of Oral and Maxillofacial Surgery and Professor of Health and Aging at the School of Public Health and Professor of Oral Medicine at the College of Dentistry at the University of Illinois. Douglas served in the United States Navy during World War II and the Korean War and was a member of the Naval Reserve for twelve years. He served two terms as an elected member of the Illinois General Assembly Illinois and is recognized as a Founding Professor and first faculty member of the University of Illinois School of Public Health. He served for two years as Fulbright Professor of Oral Surgery and Anesthesiology at Okayama University and Tokyo Medical-Dental University in Japan, 1959-1961 and as World Health Organization consultant to Colombia, Venezuela, Thailand, the United Kingdom, and the USSR and Russia. In 1971, Douglas introduced a bill to legalize abortion within the first 12 weeks of pregnancy. The bill died in committee. He received a Lifetime Achievement Award from Who's Who in America in 2018.

Douglas died at his home in Riverwoods, Illinois, on May 4, 2025, at the age of 99.
