= Democratic Party of Illinois =

Illinois affiliate of the Democratic Party

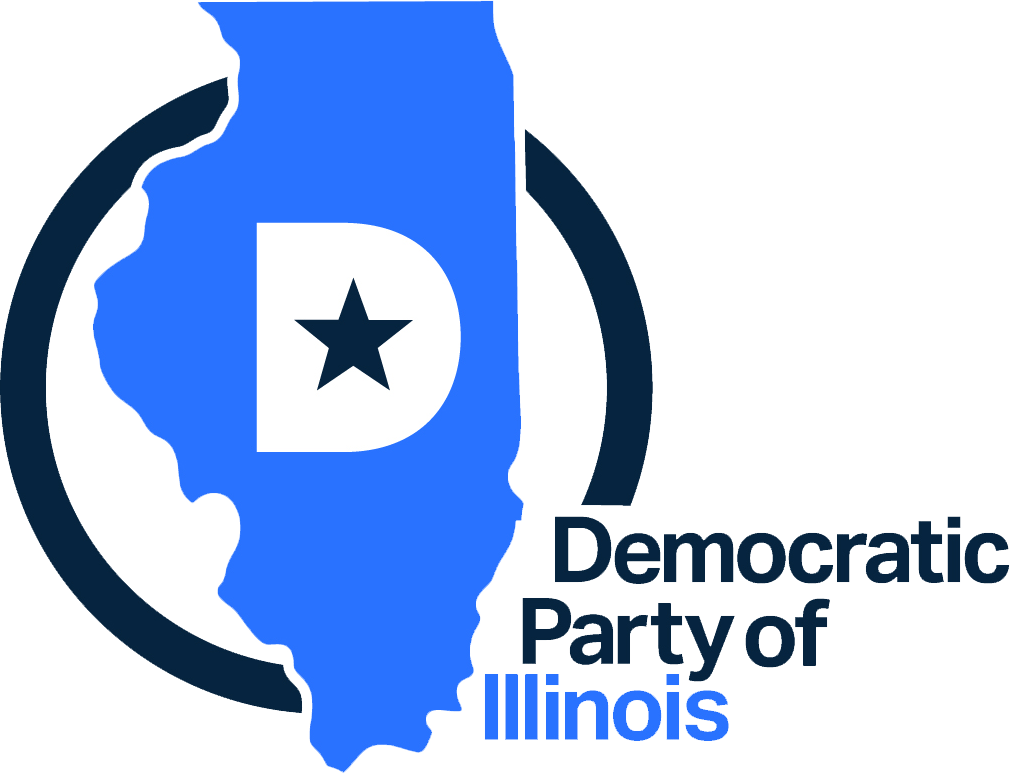
- Chairperson: Elizabeth Hernandez
- Governor: JB Pritzker
- Lieutenant Governor: Juliana Stratton
- Senate President: Don Harmon
- House Speaker: Chris Welch
- Headquarters: Springfield, Illinois
- National affiliation: Democratic Party
- Colors: Blue
- Statewide executive offices: 6 / 6
- Seats in the U.S. Senate: 2 / 2
- Seats in the U.S. House of Representatives: 14 / 17
- Seats in the Illinois Senate: 40 / 59
- Seats in the Illinois House of Representatives: 78 / 118

Election symbol

Website
- ildems.com

The Democratic Party of Illinois is the affiliate of the Democratic Party in the U.S. state of Illinois. It is the oldest extant state party in Illinois and one of just two recognized parties in the state, along with the Republican Party. It is currently the dominant party in the state, controlling the majority of Illinois's U.S. House seats, both U.S. Senate seats, both houses of the state legislature, and the governorship.

== History ==
President Barack Obama (2009–2017)

The Democratic Party of Illinois took shape during the late 1830s. Prior to that time, Illinois did not have organized political parties; instead, political competition in the state was more personalist, with prominent factions centered on Governors Ninian Edwards and Shadrach Bond. As the Democratic and Whig parties began to form at the national level during the late 1820s and 1830s, Illinois politicians began sorting themselves accordingly and, in the summer of 1837, leading Democrats met to lay the groundwork for a Democratic Party organization in the state.

Before 2010, the party had been extremely successful in statewide elections for the past decade. In 1992, Carol Moseley Braun became the first African American woman to be elected to the United States Senate. Her election marked the first time Illinois had elected a woman, and the first time a Black person was elected as a Democratic Party candidate to the United States Senate. A second African American Democratic Senator, Barack Obama was elected in 2004 (the same seat that Senator Moseley-Braun once held), and later elected President of the United States in 2008. Democrats currently hold supermajorities in both the Illinois Senate and Illinois House of Representatives.

== Organization and leadership ==
The Democratic Party of Illinois is run by a Democratic State Central Committee of 34 members, two from each of the state's 17 congressional districts. The Central Committee has four officers: a chairman, a vice-chair, a secretary, and a treasurer.

Illinois State House Representative Lisa Hernandez from the 2nd state district currently serves as the state party chairman.

=== Recent History of Committee Chairman ===
Calvin Sutker of Skokie served as state party chairman from 1985 to 1986, then lost his committeeman seat to reform Democrat Jeffrey Paul Smith. Sutker was succeeded by Vince Demuzio, who served from 1986 to 1990 and is credited with rebuilding the Illinois Democratic Party. Demuzio was then defeated by Gary LaPaille, then-chief of staff for Illinois House Speaker Michael Madigan. Madigan himself succeeded LaPaille, serving in the role until he stepped down in 2021. He was succeeded by U.S. Representative Robin Kelly. In 2022, Kelly was replaced by State Representative Lisa Hernandez.

=== State Central Committee ===
The 34 members of the State Central Committee are elected by voters in Democratic primary elections every four years, with one male and one female member from each congressional district. The below table lists members elected in 2022. New members will be elected in the 2026 elections.

State Central Committee members elected in 2022
District	Member
1	Bobby Rush
1	Michelle Harris
2	William "Will" Davis
2	Robin Kelly
3	Delia Ramirez
3	Omar Aquino
4	Jesús “Chuy” García
4	Elizabeth “Lisa” Hernandez
5	John J. Cullerton
5	Margaret Croke
6	Patrick Watson
6	Kelly Burke
7	Danny Davis
7	Karen Yarbrough
8	Mike Cudzik
8	Cristina Castro
9	Leo Smith
9	Carol Ronen
10	Thomas Maillard
10	Melinda Bush
11	Peter Janko
11	Kristina Zahorik
12	Glenn Poshard
12	Vivian Robinson
13	Bill Houlihan
13	LaToya Greenwood
14	Kevin “Duffy” Blackburn
14	Christine Benson
15	Terry Redman
15	Katherine Daniels
16	John Daniel
16	Elizabeth Lindquist
17	Maurice West
17	Pamela Davidson

== Current elected officials ==
=== Members of Congress ===
==== U.S. Senate ====
Democrats have controlled both of Illinois's seats in the U.S. Senate since 2017:

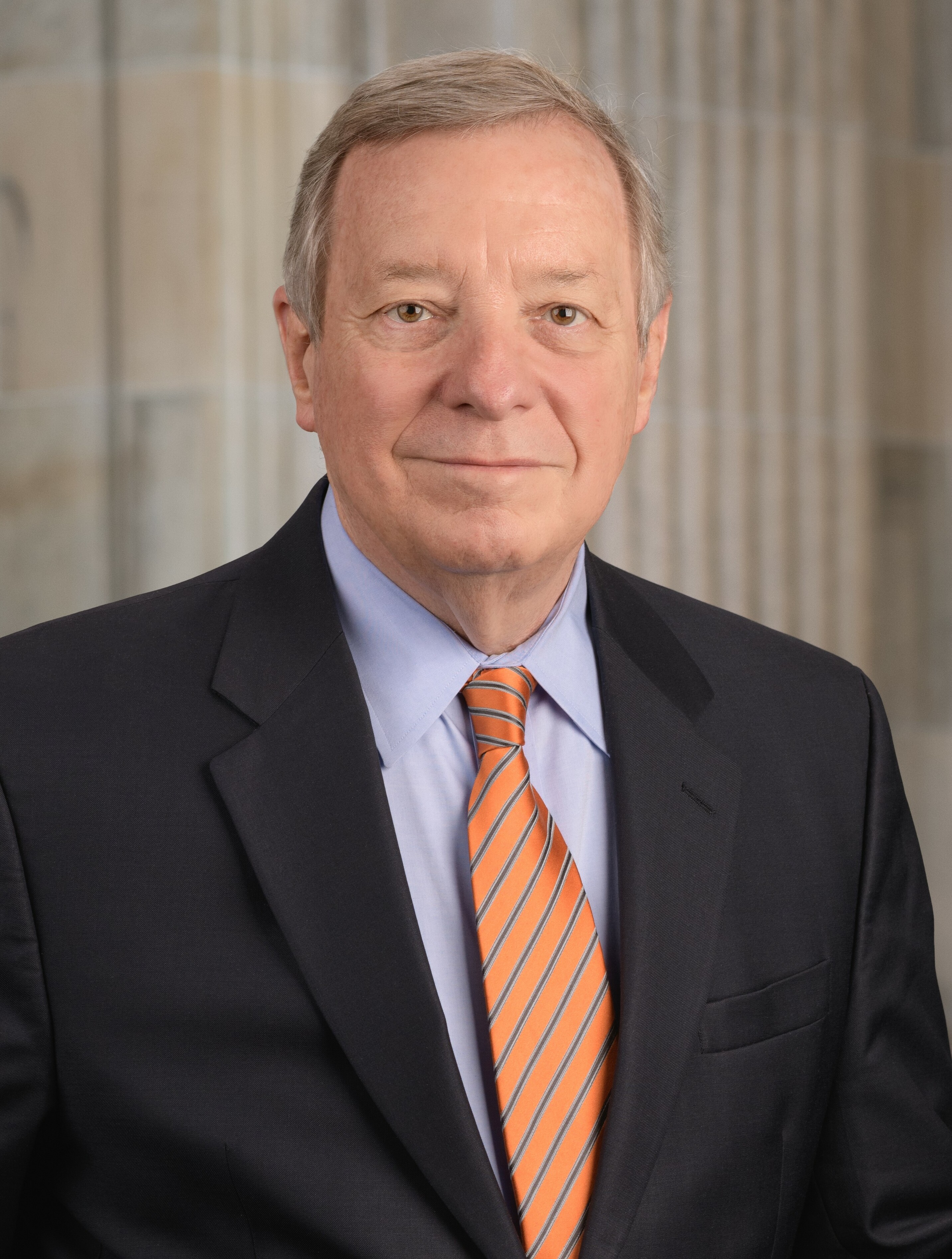
Senior U.S. Senator Dick Durbin
(Minority Whip)

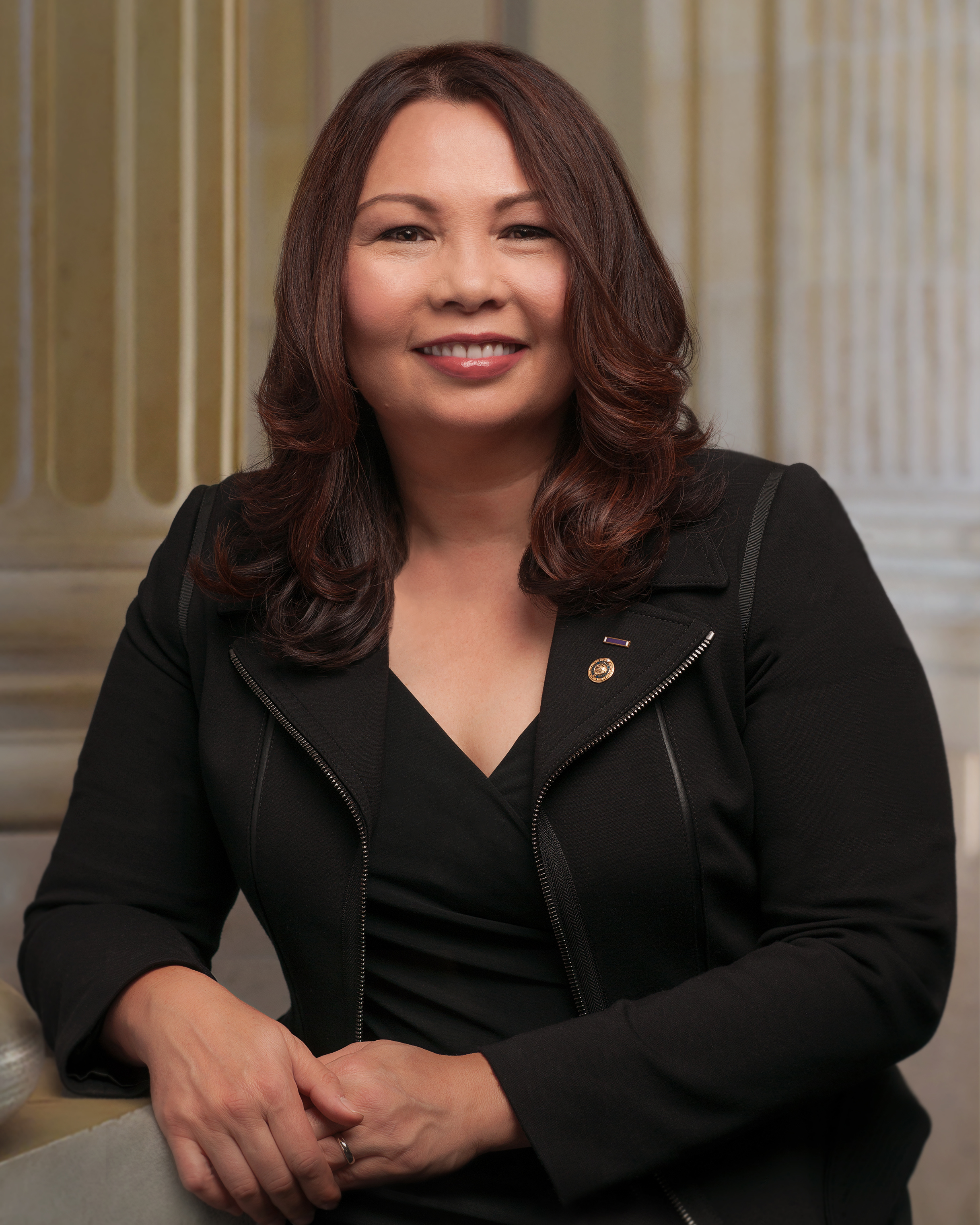
Junior (pre-Senior) U.S. Senator Tammy Duckworth

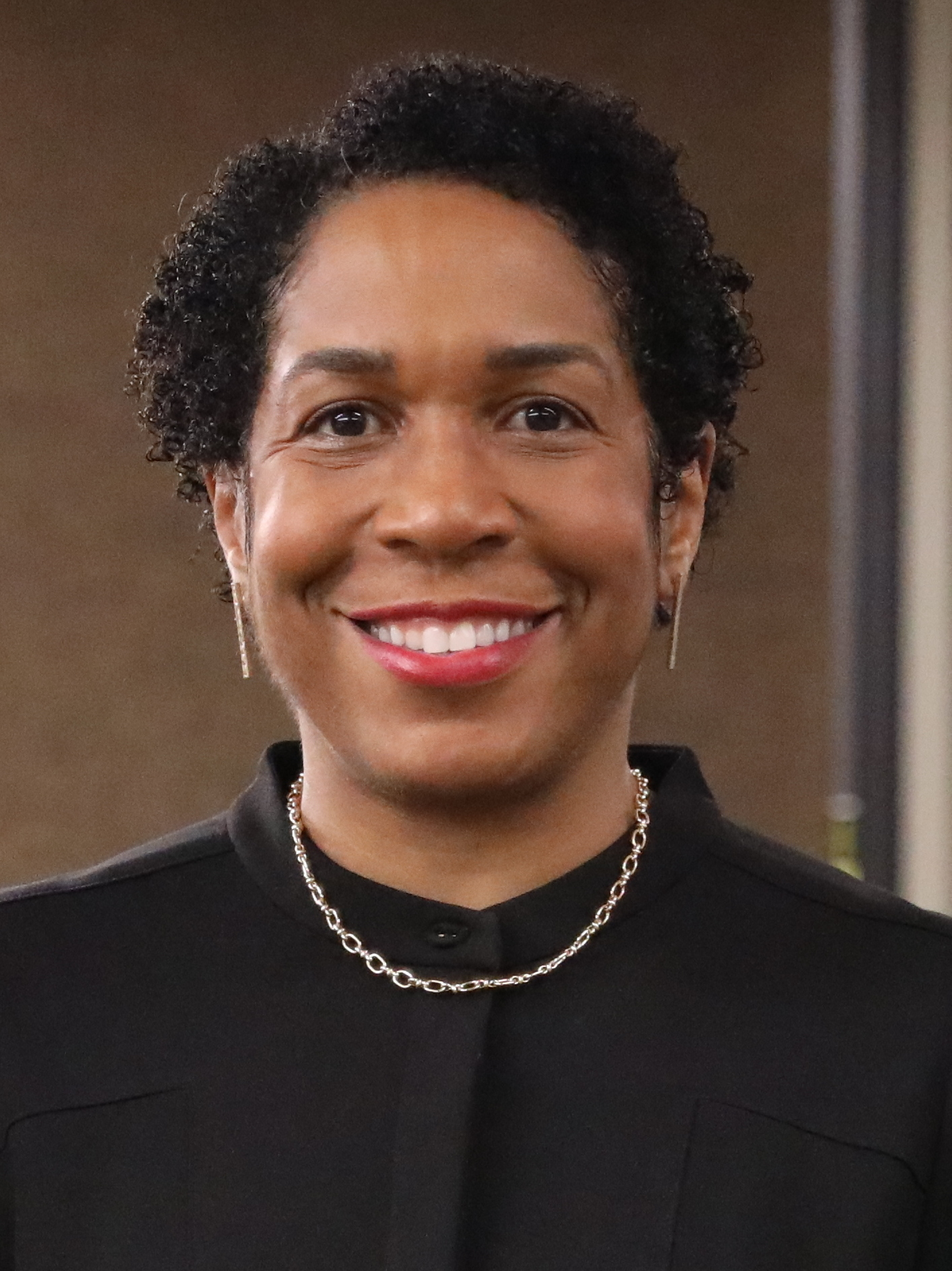
Pre-junior U.S. Senator-elect Juliana Stratton

==== U.S. House of Representatives ====
Out of the 17 seats Illinois is apportioned in the U.S. House of Representatives, 14 are held by Democrats:

Illinois Democrats in House of Representatives
District	Member	Photo
1st	Jonathan Jackson	
2nd	Robin Kelly	
2nd	Donna Miller (elect)	
3rd	Delia Ramirez	
4th	Jesús "Chuy" García	
4th	Patty García (elect)	
5th	Mike Quigley	
6th	Sean Casten	
7th	Danny K. Davis	
7th	La Shawn Ford (elect)	
8th	Raja Krishnamoorthi	
8th	Melissa Bean (elect)	
9th	Jan Schakowsky	
9th	Daniel Biss (elect)	
10th	Brad Schneider	
11th	Bill Foster	
13th	Nikki Budzinski	
14th	Lauren Underwood	
17th	Eric Sorensen	

=== Statewide officials ===
Democrats control all six of the elected statewide offices:

Governor J. B. Pritzker

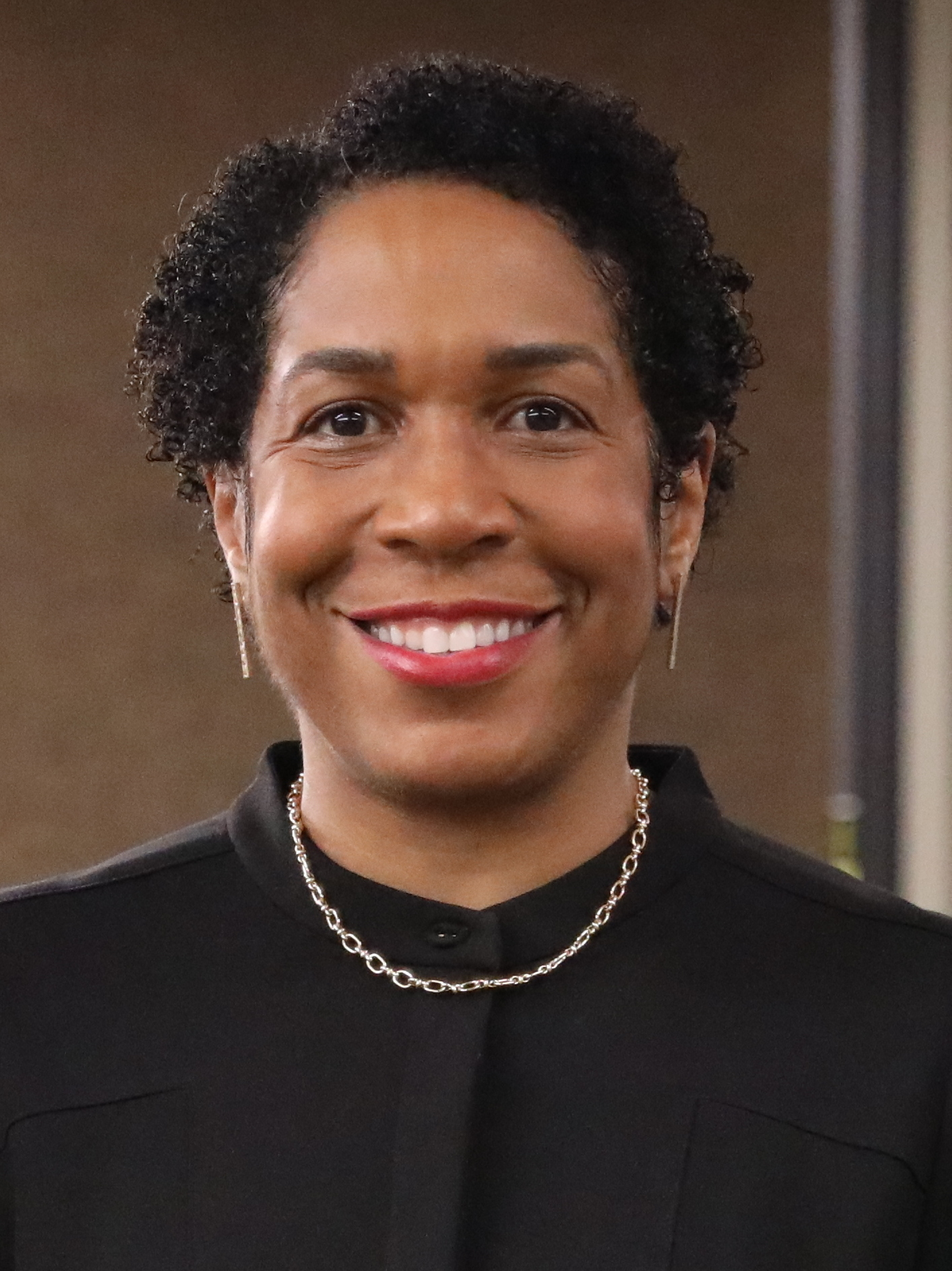
Lieutenant Governor Juliana Stratton

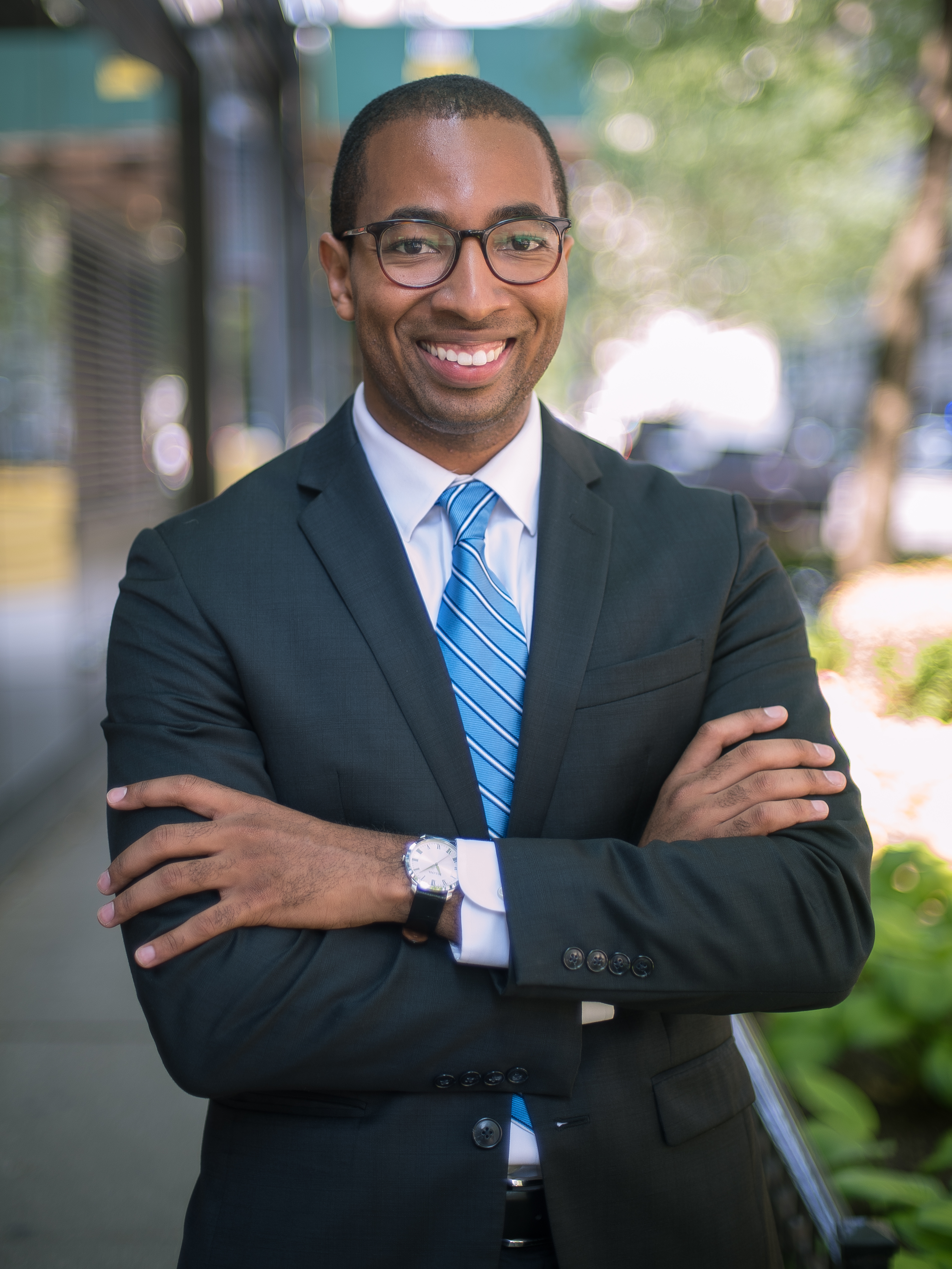
Lieutenant Governor-elect Christian Mitchell

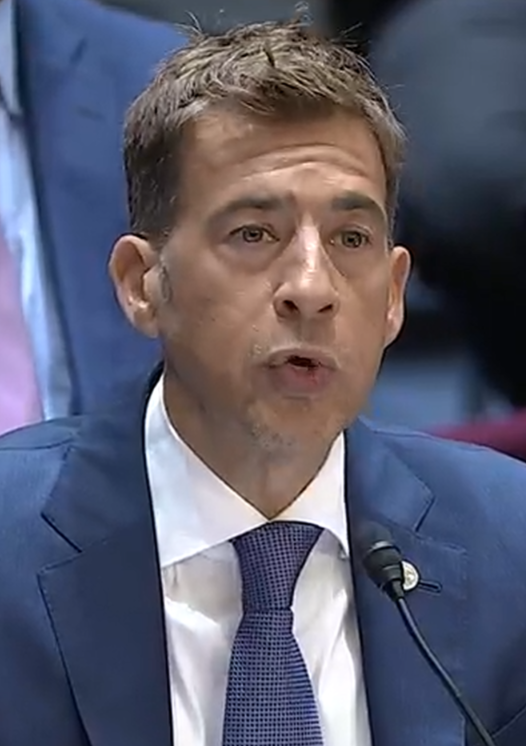
Secretary of State Alexi Giannoulias

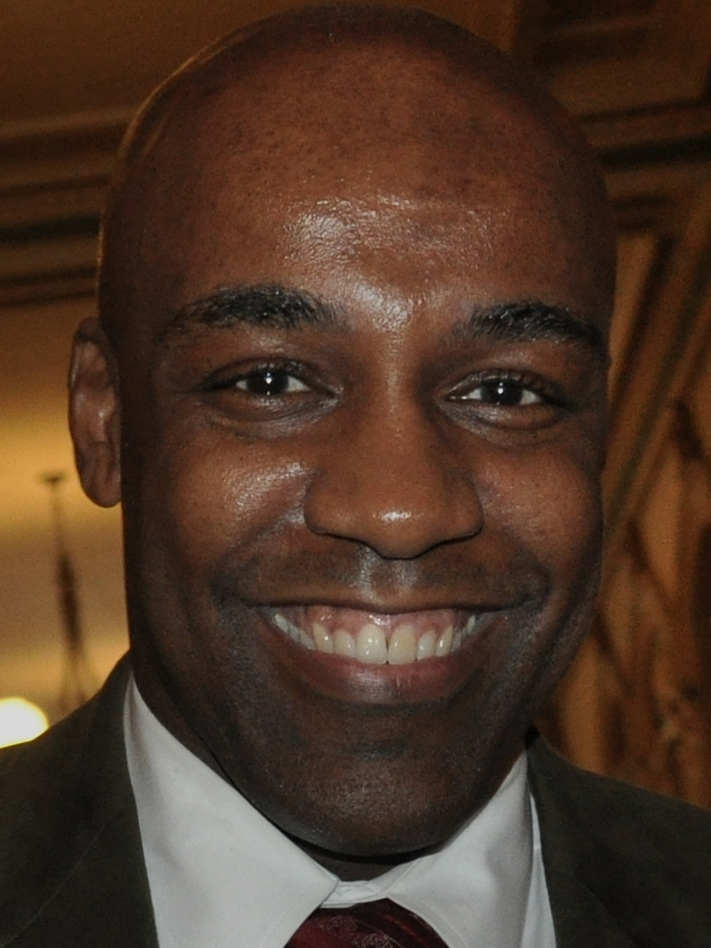
Attorney General Kwame Raoul

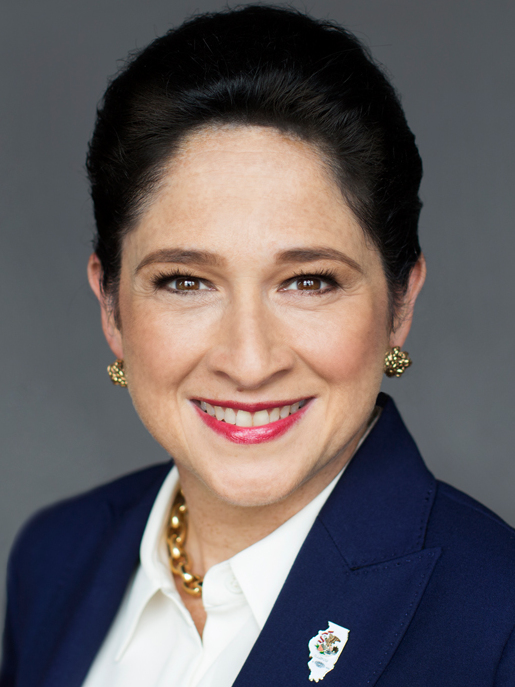
Comptroller Susana Mendoza

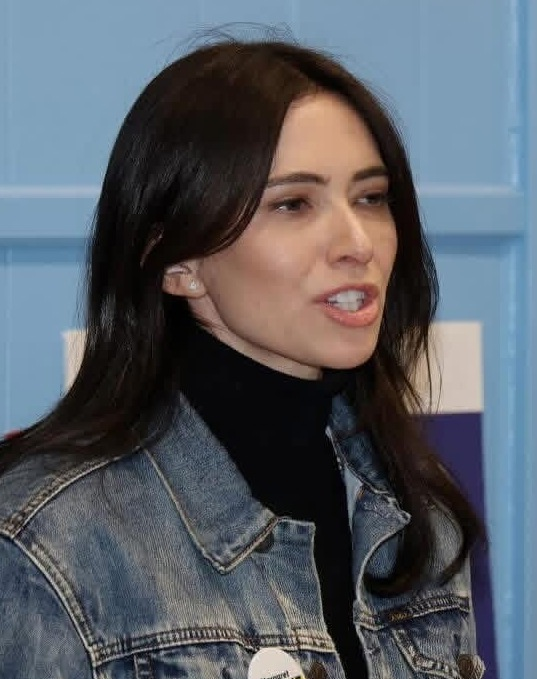
Comptroller-elect Margaret Croke

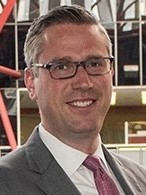
Illinois Treasurer Mike Frerichs

=== State legislative leaders ===
- President of the Illinois Senate: Don Harmon
- Senate Majority Leader: Kimberly A. Lightford
- Assistant Senate Majority Leader/President Pro Tempore: Bill Cunningham
- Deputy Senate Majority Leader: Laura Murphy
- Assistant Senate Majority Leaders: Linda Holmes, Dave Koehler, Iris Martinez, and Antonio Munoz.
- Senate Majority Caucus Chair: Mattie Hunter
- Deputy Senate Majority Caucus Chair: Jacqueline Y. Collins
- Majority Caucus Whips: Omar Aquino, Michael Hastings, Napoleon Harris III, and Laura Fine.
- Speaker of the House: Emanuel “Chris” Welch
- House Majority Leader: Greg Harris
- Deputy House Majority Leaders: Jehan Gordon-Booth, and Art Turner.
- Assistant House Majority Leaders: Kelly M. Burke, Fred Crespo, Will Davis, Elizabeth Hernandez, Jay Hoffman, and Natalie Manley.
- House Majority Conference Chairperson: Kathleen Willis

=== Mayors ===
As of 2026, Democrats control the mayor's offices in five of Illinois' ten largest cities:

- Chicago: Brandon Johnson (1)
- Aurora: John Laesch (2)
- Rockford: Janessa Neal (acting) (5)
- Peoria: Rita Ali (8)
- Waukegan: Samuel D. Cunningham Jr (10)

== Election results ==
=== Federal ===
==== U.S. Senate ====
Class 2
Year	Candidate	Votes	%	Result
1984	Paul Simon	2,397,165	50.07%	Won ✓
1990	Paul Simon	2,115,377	65.07%	Won ✓
1996	Dick Durbin	2,384,028	56.09%	Won ✓
2002	Dick Durbin	2,103,766	60.33%	Won ✓
2008	Dick Durbin	3,615,844	67.84%	Won ✓
2014	Dick Durbin	1,929,637	53.55%	Won ✓
2020	Dick Durbin	3,278,930	54.93%	Won ✓
2026	Juliana Stratton	2,598,988	61.98%	Won ✓

Class 3
Year	Candidate	Votes	%	Result
1986	Alan J. Dixon	2,033,783	65.13%	Won ✓
1992	Carol Moseley Braun	2,631,229	53.27%	Won ✓
1998	Carol Moseley Braun	1,610,496	47.44%	Lost ✗
2004	Barack Obama	3,597,456	69.97%	Won ✓
2010	Alexi Giannoulias	1,719,478	46.42%	Lost ✗
2016	Tammy Duckworth	3,012,940	54.86%	Won ✓
2022	Tammy Duckworth	2,329,136	56.82%	Won ✓

=== Federal ===
==== U.S. House ====
Election	Votes	%	Seats (IL)	±	%
2016	2,810,536	53.62	11 / 18	▲1	2.50
2018	2,744,727	60.46	13 / 18	▲2	6.84
2020	3,355,487	57.10	13 / 18	0	3.36
2022	2,271,361	56.09	14 / 17	▲1	1.01
2024	2,829,169	52.78	14 / 17	0	3.31
2026	2,622,224	62.85	14 / 17	0	10.07

=== State ===
==== Executive offices ====
Governor
Election	Gubernatorial candidate	Votes	Vote %	Result
1948	Adlai Stevenson II	2,250,074	57.11%	Won ✓
1952	Sherwood Dixon	2,089,721	47.32%	Lost ✗
1956	Richard B. Austin	2,134,909	49.48%	Lost ✗
1960	Otto Kerner Jr.	2,594,731	55.51%	Won ✓
1964	Otto Kerner Jr.	2,418,394	51.93%	Won ✓
1968	Samuel H. Shapiro	2,179,501	48.37%	Lost ✗
1972	Dan Walker/Neil Hartigan	2,371,303	50.68%	Won ✓
1976	Michael Howlett/Neil Hartigan	1,610,258	34.71%	Lost ✗
1978	Michael Bakalis/Dick Durbin	1,263,134	40.10%	Lost ✗
1982	Adlai Stevenson III/Grace Mary Stern	483,291	49.30%	Lost ✗
1986	No nominee/Mark Fairchild	208,830	6.64%	Lost ✗
1990	Neil Hartigan/Jim Burns	1,569,217	48.17%	Lost ✗
1994	Dawn Clark Netsch/Penny Severns	1,069,850	34.44%	Lost ✗
1998	Glenn Poshard/Mary Lou Kearns	1,594,191	47.46%	Lost ✗
2002	Rod Blagojevich/Pat Quinn	1,847,040	52.19%	Won ✓
2006	Rod Blagojevich/Pat Quinn	1,736,731	49.79%	Won ✓
2010	Pat Quinn/Sheila Simon	1,745,219	46.79%	Won ✓
2014	Pat Quinn/Paul Vallas	1,681,343	46.35%	Lost ✗
2018	JB Pritzker/Juliana Stratton	2,479,746	54.53%	Won ✓
2022	JB Pritzker/Juliana Stratton	2,253,748	54.91%	Won ✓
2026	JB Pritzker/Christian Mitchell	2,540,792	60.6%	Won ✓

Secretary of State
Election	Candidate	Votes	%	Result
2014	Jesse White	2,374,849	65.70%	Won ✓
2018	Jesse White	3,120,207	68.26%	Won ✓
2022	Alexi Giannoulias	2,220,713	54.28%	Won ✓
2026	Alexi Giannoulias	2,631,753	64.8%	Won ✓

Attorney General
Election	Candidate	Votes	%	Result
2014	Lisa Madigan	2,142,558	59.46%	Won ✓
2018	Kwame Raoul	2,488,326	54.71%	Won ✓
2022	Kwame Raoul	2,219,420	54.35%	Won ✓
2026	Kwame Raoul	2,506,661	61.6%	Won ✓

Treasurer
Election	Candidate	Votes	%	Result
2014	Mike Frerichs	1,694,885	48.05%	Won ✓
2018	Mike Frerichs	2,593,816	57.6%	Won ✓
2022	Mike Frerichs	2,206,434	54.29%	Won ✓
2026	Mike Frerichs	2,598,244	62.8%	Won ✓

== See also ==
- Illinois Republican Party
- Political party strength in Illinois
