= Ira Colitz =

American politician and businessman

Ira Colitz (September 27, 1916 – January 24, 1998) was an American politician and businessman.

Colitz was born in Chicago, Illinois and went to the Chicago public schools. He served in the United States Army during World War II. Colitz was in the insurance business and was involved with the Democratic Party. Colitz served in the Illinois House of Representatives in 1971 and 1972. He served on the Cook County Zoning Board of Appeals. In 1973, Colitz was indicted on federal charges on extorting money from a furniture business for a favorable zoning change; he was acquitted of the charge in 1975. He died at his home in Chicago from a long illness.

== Personal life ==
He was Jewish.
