= John Cullerton =

American politician (born 1948)

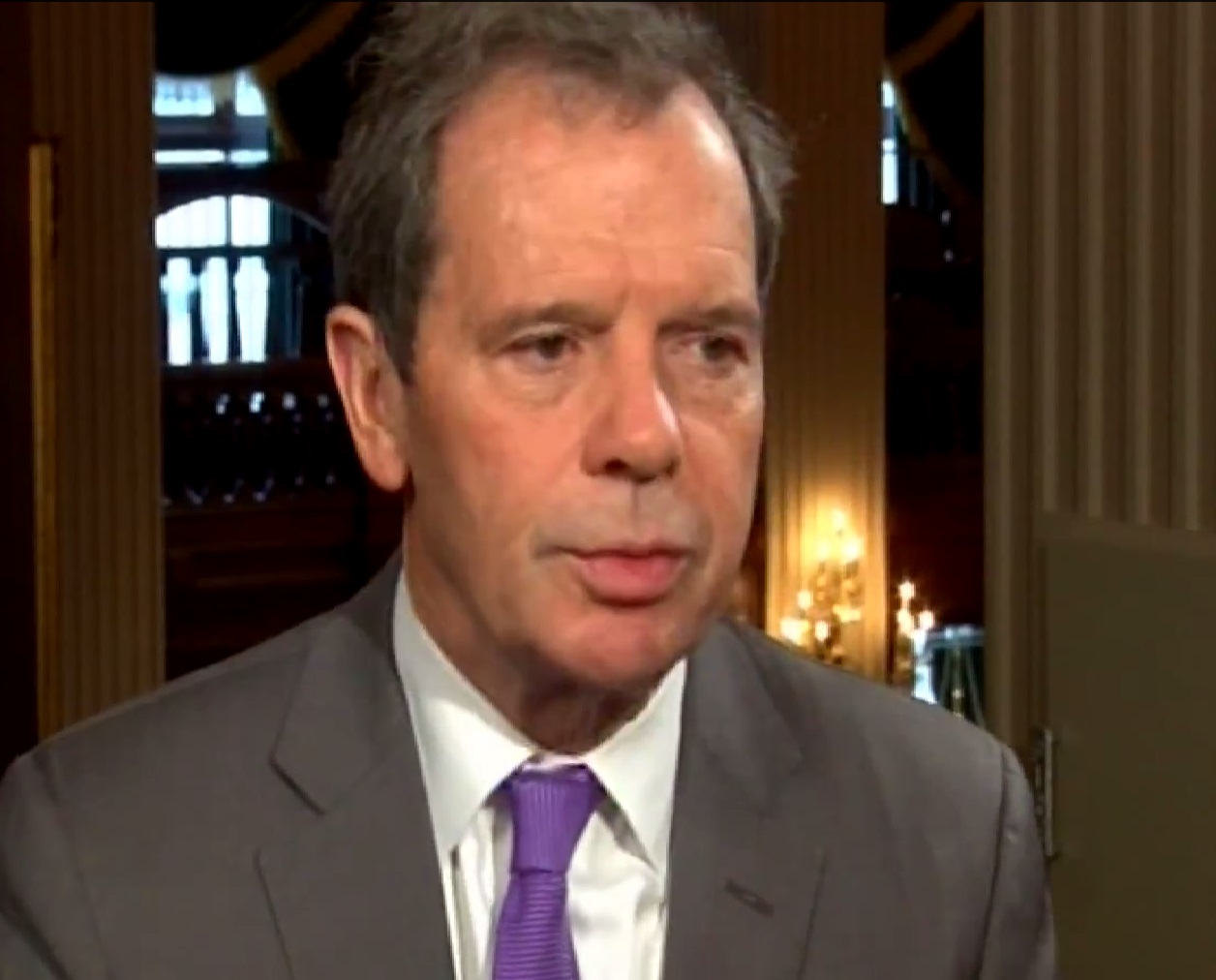
- Cullerton in 2013

38th President of the Illinois Senate
- In office January 14, 2009 – January 19, 2020
- Preceded by: Emil Jones
- Succeeded by: Don Harmon

Member of the Illinois Senate from the 6th district
- In office January 31, 1991 – January 20, 2020
- Preceded by: Dawn Clark Netsch
- Succeeded by: Sara Feigenholtz

Member of the Illinois House of Representatives from the 7th district 12th district (1979–1983)
- In office January 10, 1979 – January 31, 1991
- Preceded by: Ellis B. Levin
- Succeeded by: Ann Stepan

Personal details
- Born: October 28, 1948 (age 77) Chicago, Illinois, U.S.
- Party: Democratic
- Spouse: Pam Cullerton
- Children: 5
- Education: Loyola University, Chicago (BA, JD)

Military service
- Allegiance: United States
- Branch/service: United States Army
- Years of service: 1970–1976
- Unit: Illinois National Guard

John J. Cullerton (born October 28, 1948) is an American politician who served as a Democratic member of the Illinois Senate, representing the 6th district from his appointment in 1991 to 2020. He served as President of the Illinois Senate from 2009 to 2020.

On November 14, 2019 Cullerton announced to the other members of the Senate Democratic Caucus that he intended to retire in January 2020. Cullerton was then replaced by the State Senator for the 39th district, Don Harmon in a closed door vote of the Illinois Senate on January 19, 2020. Cullerton formally resigned from the Senate the next day.

== Early life ==
Cullerton is a native of Chicago. He received his bachelor's degree in political science from Loyola University of Chicago, where he also earned his J.D. degree. After graduating from law school, Cullerton served as a Chicago Assistant Public Defender. He went on to work at the law firm of Fagel and Haber.

Cullerton is a member of the Cullerton political family, dating its political involvement back to longtime Chicago alderman Edward Cullerton.

== Political career ==
=== Illinois House ===
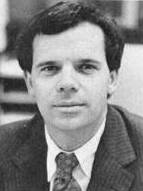
official portrait , circa 1987

In 1979, he was elected to the Illinois General Assembly where he served for twelve years as a member of the House of Representatives. He served as Democratic Floor Leader. According to Cullerton's campaign website, he sponsored the most bills and had the most bills passed of all legislators in the 93rd and 94th General Assemblies.

=== Illinois Senate ===
After being appointed to fill Dawn Clark Netsch's seat in 1991, Cullerton was elected to the state senate in 1992 where he was appointed Senate Majority Caucus Whip. Cullerton has been recognized for sponsoring more bills than any other legislator and having more signed into law by the governor.

In 1994, Cullerton challenged embattled incumbent Dan Rostenkowski in the Democratic primary for Illinois's 5th congressional district, placing second of five candidates, behind Rostenkowski and ahead of three others (including former aldermen Dick Simpson and Michael A. Wojcik).

Cullerton was chosen as the senate president by the Senate Democratic Caucus on November 19, 2008 to begin serving in 2009, replacing the retiring Emil Jones.

His first legislative priority as senate president was to pass the first Capital Bill in 10 years, which allocated roughly $31 billion for public works projects and created tens of thousands of jobs in Illinois Public Act 096-0036 . Cullerton led the senate during the impeachment trial, and subsequent removal, of former Governor Rod Blagojevich.

Cullerton served as a delegate to the 2012 Democratic National Convention.

=== Controversy ===
In May 2017, Cullerton intervened in a land dispute outside of his district when he advocated, on behalf of the Keefe Family Trust, to pave over a section of publicly owned wetland to build a 28 foot long driveway, which would require killing approximately 48 mature trees in a small old-growth forest. Despite the opposition and objections of the Village of Wilmette, the City of Evanston, the publicly operated Canal Shores Golf Course and numerous community organizations, Cullerton met with local officials on multiple occasions to argue in favor of a driveway to access a landlocked parcel so the Keefe Family Trust could build a subdivision of three houses. The parcel had been landlocked when the Keefe Family Trust purchased it.

== Professional career ==
Cullerton served part-time as an Illinois state senator. Fagel Haber merged with Thompson Coburn LLP in 2007, and Cullerton continues as a partner, practicing in the areas of government relations, zoning, licensing, real estate tax assessment, and nonprofit law.

== Retirement ==
Cullerton announced in November 2019 that he would officially retire and step down as Illinois Senate President in January 2020.

== Personal life ==
Cullerton and his wife, Pam, have five children.

=== Controversy ===
On June 6, 2019, Bishop Thomas Paprocki issued a decree officially barring Illinois House Speaker Michael Madigan and Senate President John Cullerton from presenting themselves to receive the Eucharist on account of their role in Passing the Reproductive Health Act, which removes spousal consent and waiting periods for abortions. While singling out Madigan and Cullerton specifically, Paprocki also asked that other legislators who voted for the bill not present themselves for Communion either, stating that they had "cooperated in evil and committed grave sin." Madigan stated that Paprocki had informed him earlier that he would be forbidden from taking the sacrament if he permitted the House to debate and vote on the measure, but that he chose to do so.

Political offices
Preceded by Emil Jones	President of the Illinois Senate; 2009–2020	Succeeded by Don Harmon
