= Don Harmon =

American politician (born 1966)

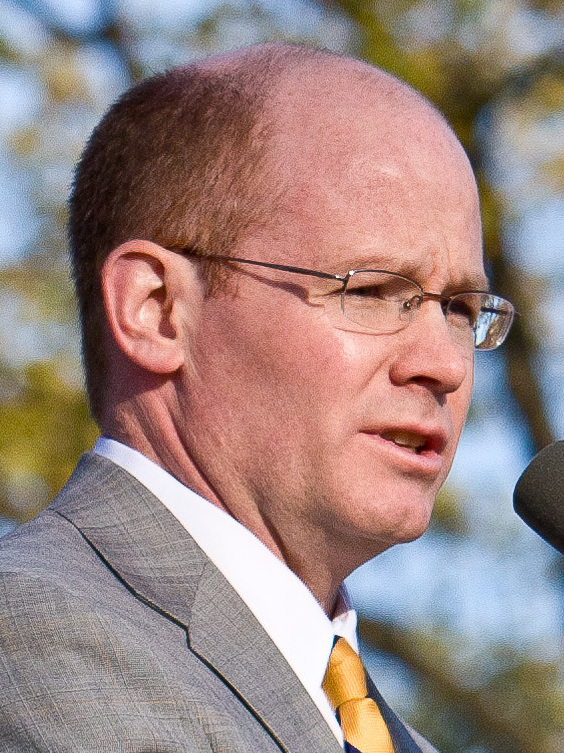
- Harmon in 2010

39th President of the Illinois Senate
- Incumbent
- Assumed office January 19, 2020
- Preceded by: John Cullerton

President pro tempore of the Illinois Senate
- In office January 3, 2011 – January 9, 2019
- Preceded by: Position established
- Succeeded by: Bill Cunningham (2020)

Member of the Illinois Senate from the 39th district
- Incumbent
- Assumed office January 3, 2003
- Preceded by: Dan Cronin (redistricted)

Personal details
- Born: November 26, 1966 (age 59) Oak Park, Illinois, U.S.
- Party: Democratic
- Education: Knox College (BA); University of Chicago (JD, MBA)

Don Harmon (born November 26, 1966) is an American attorney and president of the Illinois Senate since 2020. A member of the Democratic party, he has represented the 39th Senate District since 2003. His district includes Chicago's Austin neighborhood and the suburbs of Oak Park, Addison, Bensenville, Elmwood Park, Franklin Park, Melrose Park, Northlake, River Grove, Rosemont, Schiller Park, and Stone Park.

In January 2009, incoming Illinois Senate President John Cullerton appointed Harmon the State Senate's Assistant Majority Leader. Harmon was appointed Illinois Senate President Pro Tempore in 2011. In January 2019, Harmon lost that title when Cullerton retired the President Pro Tempore leadership position. Harmon was later elected to succeed Cullerton as President of the Illinois Senate on January 19, 2020.

== Early life and career ==
Harmon was born and raised in Oak Park where he attended St. Giles Grade School. He graduated from St. Ignatius College Prep on Chicago's West Side; Knox College in Galesburg, Illinois and the University of Chicago (J.D. and M.B.A.). After law school, Harmon served in Springfield on the House legal staff.

Harmon was a partner at the Chicago-based law firm Burke, Burns & Pinelli until he stepped down from the firm in January 2020.

== Political career ==
In August 2000, Don Harmon was nominated by members of the Democratic Party of Oak Park to fulfill the term of former Illinois Senate President Phil Rock as Oak Park Democratic Committeeman. He was then elected to his first full term as Committeeman in 2002 and has since been re-elected in 2006 and 2010. In 2010, Harmon was elected to serve as the Suburban Vice-Chair of the Democratic Party of Cook County.

=== Gun control ===
Harmon supports gun control and is a supporter of a bill to ban assault weapons in 2023.

=== Illinois Senate ===
First elected in the fall of 2002, Harmon served alongside then-State Senator and now former U.S. President Barack Obama.

In the State Senate, Harmon voted for a bill that allows government to charge citizens for Freedom of Information Act requests. Critics of the bill argued it weakens the public's ability to receive information from the government. The bill passed with dissenting votes from Democrats and Republicans.

Harmon introduced legislation to legalize sports betting in Illinois. The bill "would allow wagering on professional and collegiate sports," according to one report.

Harmon sponsored legislation creating the Illinois Early Learning Council to create policy recommendations regarding the education of children from birth to age five. The result of that effort was the Pre-School for All program implemented throughout the state. He also authored the Illinois Civil Rights Act of 2003 to prohibit discriminatory policies by state, county or local governments, and to preserve for Illinois citizens civil rights protections eroded by recent U.S. Supreme Court Decisions.

Additionally he helped pass legislation to eliminate two obsolete taxing districts-the Cook County Tuberculosis Sanitarium District and the Cicero Township Trustee of Schools saving taxpayers millions of dollars.

==== Committee assignments ====
As of July 2022, Senator Harmon is a member of the following Illinois Senate committees:

- Executive Committee (SEXC)
- (Chairman of) Executive - Firearms Committee (SEXC-SFIR)
- Redistricting - Chicago West and Western Cook County Committee (SRED-SRWW)

== Controversy ==
On September 24, 2019, federal authorities raided the offices of State Senator Martin Sandoval. Among the documents seized were documents from Harmon's law firm, Burke, Burns & Pinelli. The Chicago Sun-Times reported that his firm "represents numerous government agencies in the Chicago region, including the Village of Lyons, where the mayor is Chris Getty. The Lyons village hall and Getty’s private insurance offices were visited September 26 by federal agents." When asked about the raided documents, Harmon responded, "I have absolutely no idea to what that refers." Sandoval resigned from the Illinois Senate on November 27, 2019.

In 2017, the Chicago Sun-Times reported on Harmon's dual role as legislator and as an attorney handling state clients. A 2012 report alleges that Harmon refused to answer questions connected to his law practice.

In 2019, another report by the Chicago Sun-Times highlighted the relationship between Harmon's firm and clout-heavy lobbyist Frank Cortese. Cortese is a close affiliate of convicted Teamsters boss John Coli. The Sun-Times revealed that Cortese set up a lobbying business "with the help of a clout-heavy law firm of Burke Burns & Pinelli, whose attorneys have donated heavily to Madigan’s campaigns over the years. Among the partners at the firm: state Sen. Don Harmon, who is vying to replace the retiring Cullerton as Illinois Senate president."

Illinois Senate
New office	President pro tempore of the Illinois Senate; 2011–2019	Vacant Title next held by Bill Cunningham; 2020
Political offices
Preceded by John Cullerton	President of the Illinois Senate; 2020–present	Incumbent
