= Alfred Ronan =

American politician

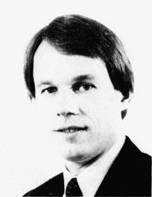
official portrait, circa 1987

Alfred G. "Al" Ronan (born December 3, 1947) is a former American politician.

Born in Chicago, Illinois, Ronan received his bachelor's degree in political science and his master's degree in political and urban affairs from University of Illinois at Chicago. He was a management consultant. Ronan served in the Illinois House of Representatives from 1979 to 1993 and was a Democrat. After Ronan left the Illinois General Assembly, Ronan worked as a lobbyist and was the owner of his firm.
