= Senator McGuire =

Senator McGuire may refer to:

- Barbara McGuire (politician) (fl. 2000s–2010s), Arizona State Senate
- Lesil McGuire (born 1971), Alaska State Senate
- Mary Jo McGuire (born 1956), Minnesota State Senate
- Mike McGuire (politician) (born 1979), California State Senate
- Pat McGuire (politician) (fl. 2000s–2010s), Illinois State Senate
