= Emily McAsey =

American politician

Member of the Illinois House of Representatives from the 85th district
- In office January 14, 2009 – June 2, 2017
- Preceded by: Brent Hassert
- Succeeded by: John Connor

Personal details
- Born: March 14, 1978 (age 48) Chicago, Illinois, U.S.
- Party: Democratic
- Education: College of William & Mary; Loyola Law School
- Profession: Attorney

Emily McAsey (born March 14, 1978) is a former Democratic member of the Illinois House of Representatives. A lawyer and teacher, she defeated Brent Hassert in November 2008 to become the state representative from Illinois's 85th House District. The district serves a suburban area north of Joliet along Illinois's Interstate 55. McAsey resigned to join her husband who recently accepted a job position out of state.
