= Brent Hassert =

American politician (1952–2024)

Member of the Illinois House of Representatives from the 85th district
- In office 1993–2009
- Succeeded by: Emily McAsey

Personal details
- Born: October 29, 1952 Joliet, Illinois, U.S.
- Died: August 29, 2024 (aged 71) Plainfield, Illinois, U.S.
- Party: Republican
- Profession: landscape contractor

Brent Alan Hassert (October 29, 1952 – August 29, 2024) was an American politician who was a Republican member of the Illinois House of Representatives, representing the 85th district where he served from 1993 until January 2009. He served as Deputy House Republican Leader.

Hassert was the owner of Hassert Landscaping. He was elected to the Will County Board in the 1988 general election. That year, he was part of a task force which spurred the adoption of the Solid Waste Planning and Recycling Act (PA 85-1198).

During the 2008 Republican Party presidential primaries, Hassert endorsed the presidential campaign of Rudy Giuliani. In his November 2008 bid for re-election, Hassert was defeated by Emily McAsey.

Hassert died in Plainfield, Illinois, on August 29, 2024, at the age of 71.
