= 2020 United States House of Representatives elections in Illinois =

- November 3, 2020

All 18 Illinois seats to the United States House of Representatives
	Majority party	Minority party
Party	Democratic	Republican
Last election	13	5
Seats won	13	5
Seat change	Steady	Steady
Popular vote	3,355,487	2,416,929
Percentage	57.10%	41.13%
Swing	▼3.36%	▲2.48%

Democratic
50–60%
60–70%
70–80%
80–90%
Republican
50–60%
60–70%
70–80%
80–90%

The 2020 United States House of Representatives elections in Illinois were held on November 3, 2020, to elect the 18 U.S. representatives from the state of Illinois, one from each of the state's 18 congressional districts. The elections coincided with the 2020 U.S. presidential election, as well as other elections to the House of Representatives, elections to the United States Senate, various state and local elections, and the Illinois Fair Tax.

== Statewide ==
Popular vote
Democratic	57.10%
Republican	41.13%
Other	1.78%

House seats
Democratic	72.22%
Republican	27.78%

=== By district ===
Results of the 2020 United States House of Representatives elections in Illinois by district:

District	Democratic		Republican		Others		Total		Result
District	Votes	%	Votes	%	Votes	%	Votes	%	Result
District 1	239,943	73.80%	85,027	26.15%	153	0.05%	325,123	100.0%	Democratic hold
District 2	234,896	78.81%	63,142	21.19%	0	0.00%	298,038	100.0%	Democratic hold
District 3	172,997	56.38%	133,851	43.62%	0	0.00%	306,848	100.0%	Democratic hold
District 4	187,219	84.05%	35,518	15.95%	0	0.00%	222,737	100.0%	Democratic hold
District 5	255,661	70.77%	96,200	26.63%	9,410	2.60%	361,271	100.0%	Democratic hold
District 6	213,777	52.82%	183,891	45.43%	7,079	1.75%	404,747	100.0%	Democratic hold
District 7	249,383	80.41%	41,390	13.35%	19,355	6.24%	310,128	100.0%	Democratic hold
District 8	186,251	73.16%	0	0.00%	68,327	26.84%	254,578	100.0%	Democratic hold
District 9	262,045	70.98%	107,125	29.02%	0	0.00%	369,170	100.0%	Democratic hold
District 10	202,402	63.87%	114,442	36.12%	30	0.01%	316,874	100.0%	Democratic hold
District 11	194,557	63.30%	112,807	36.70%	13	0.00%	307,377	100.0%	Democratic hold
District 12	127,577	39.57%	194,839	60.43%	0	0.00%	322,416	100.0%	Republican hold
District 13	151,648	45.54%	181,373	54.46%	0	0.00%	333,021	100.0%	Republican hold
District 14	203,209	50.67%	197,835	49.33%	8	0.00%	401,052	100.0%	Democratic hold
District 15	88,559	26.55%	244,947	73.45%	0	0.00%	333,506	100.0%	Republican hold
District 16	119,313	35.28%	218,839	64.71%	7	0.00%	338,159	100.0%	Republican hold
District 17	156,011	52.02%	143,863	47.97%	21	0.01%	299,895	100.0%	Democratic hold
District 18	110,039	29.59%	261,840	70.41%	0	0.00%	371,879	100.0%	Republican hold
Total	3,355,487	57.10%	2,416,929	41.13%	104,403	1.78%	5,876,819	100.0%	

== District 1 ==
2020 Illinois's 1st congressional district election
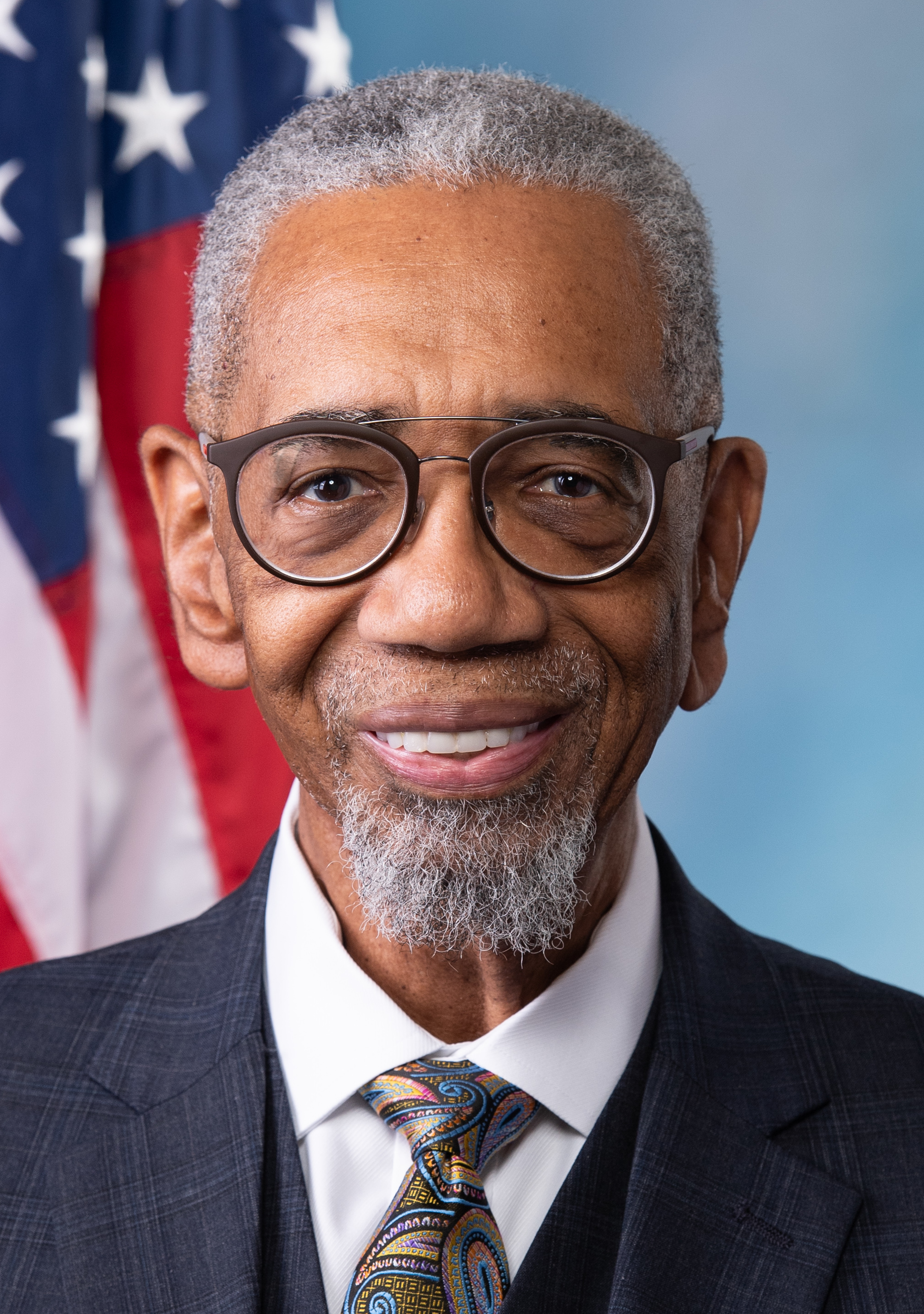

Nominee	Bobby Rush	Philanise White
Party	Democratic	Republican
Popular vote	239,943	85,027
Percentage	73.8%	26.1%
- County results Rush: 80–90% White: 60–70%
U.S. Representative before election
Bobby Rush
Democratic
Elected U.S. Representative
Bobby Rush
Democratic

The 1st district takes in the South Side of Chicago, the southern suburbs of Chicago, and continues southwest to Joliet. The incumbent was Democrat Bobby Rush, who was re-elected with 73.5% of the vote in 2018.

=== Democratic primary ===
==== Candidates ====
===== Nominee =====
- Bobby Rush, incumbent U.S. representative

===== Eliminated in primary =====
- Robert Emmons Jr., nonprofit executive
- Sarah Gad, law student and opioid recovery advocate
- Ameena Matthews, community activist

==== Endorsements ====
Bobby Rush

Organizations

- Planned Parenthood Action Fund
- Sierra Club
Robert Emmons Jr.

Newspapers

- The Chicago Maroon
- Chicago Tribune

Organizations

- Brand New Congress
- Sunrise Movement

==== Forum ====
2020 Illinois's 1st congressional district candidate forum
No.	Date	Host	Moderator	Link	Democratic	Democratic	Democratic	Democratic
Key: P Participant A Absent N Not invited I Invited W Withdrawn								
Key: P Participant A Absent N Not invited I Invited W Withdrawn					Robert Emmons Jr.	Sarah Gad	Ameena Matthews	Bobby Rush
1	Jan. 27, 2020	First Unitarian Church of Chicago; Indivisible Chicago South Side	Esther Peters		P	P	A	P

==== Primary results ====
Democratic primary results
Party	Candidate	Votes	%
Democratic	Bobby Rush (incumbent)	94,863	71.5
Democratic	Sarah Gad	13,783	10.4
Democratic	Robert Emmons Jr.	13,628	10.3
Democratic	Ameena Matthews	10,409	7.8
Total votes		132,683	100.0

=== Republican primary ===
==== Nominee ====
- Philanise White, renal technician

==== Primary results ====
Republican primary results
Party	Candidate	Votes	%
Republican	Philanise White	10,134	100.0
Republican	Richard Mayers (write-in)	1	0.0
Total votes		10,135	100.0

=== Third parties ===
==== Removed ====
- Ruth Pellegrini (independent)

=== General election ===
==== Predictions ====
Source	Ranking	As of
The Cook Political Report	Safe D	October 21, 2020
Inside Elections	Safe D	October 16, 2020
Sabato's Crystal Ball	Safe D	October 20, 2020
Politico	Safe D	October 11, 2020
Daily Kos	Safe D	October 26, 2020
RCP	Safe D	October 28, 2020
Niskanen	Safe D	June 7, 2020

==== Results ====
Illinois's 1st congressional district, 2020
Party	Candidate	Votes	%	±%
Democratic	Bobby Rush (incumbent)	239,943	73.80	+0.29%
Republican	Philanise White	85,027	26.15	+6.39%
Write-in		153	0.05	N/A
Total votes		325,123	100.0	
Democratic hold				

== District 2 ==
2020 Illinois's 2nd congressional district election
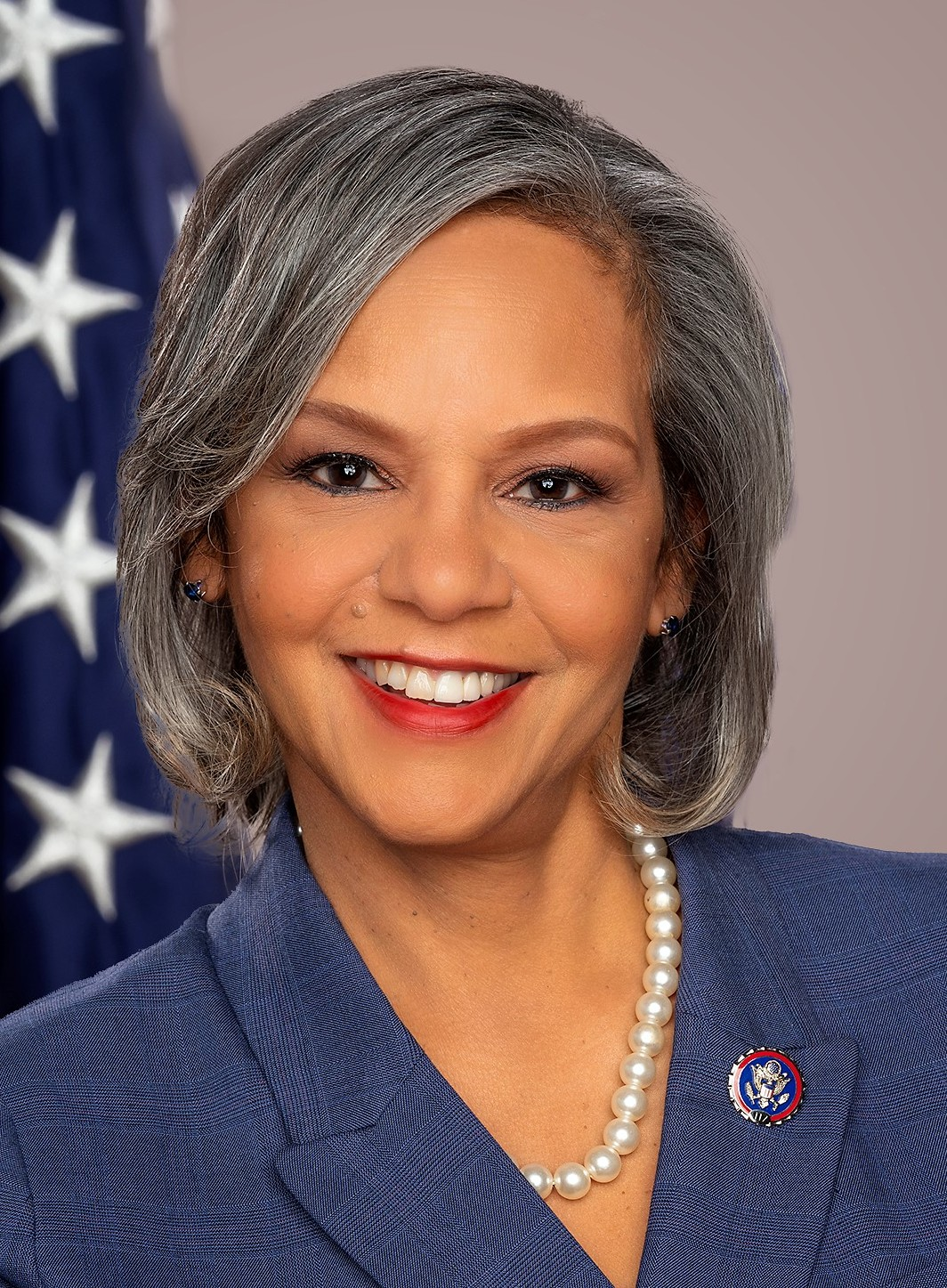

Nominee	Robin Kelly	Theresa Raborn
Party	Democratic	Republican
Popular vote	234,896	63,142
Percentage	78.8%	21.2%
- County results Kelly: 50–60% 80–90% Merkle: 50–60%
U.S. Representative before election
Robin Kelly
Democratic
Elected U.S. Representative
Robin Kelly
Democratic

The 2nd district encompasses South Side Chicago and its southern suburbs, including eastern Will County and Kankakee County. The incumbent was Democrat Robin Kelly, who was re-elected with 81.1% of the vote in 2018.

=== Democratic primary ===
==== Candidates ====
===== Nominee =====
- Robin Kelly, incumbent U.S. representative

===== Eliminated in primary =====
- Marcus Lewis, postal worker

==== Primary results ====
Democratic primary results
Party	Candidate	Votes	%
Democratic	Robin Kelly (incumbent)	94,767	84.8
Democratic	Marcus Lewis	16,942	15.2
Total votes		111,709	100.0

=== Republican primary ===
==== Candidates ====
===== Nominee =====
- Theresa Raborn, activist

==== Primary results ====
Republican primary results
Party	Candidate	Votes	%
Republican	Theresa Raborn	12,181	100.0
Total votes		12,181	100.0

=== General election ===
==== Predictions ====
Source	Ranking	As of
The Cook Political Report	Safe D	October 21, 2020
Inside Elections	Safe D	October 16, 2020
Sabato's Crystal Ball	Safe D	October 20, 2020
Politico	Safe D	October 11, 2020
Daily Kos	Safe D	October 26, 2020
RCP	Safe D	October 28, 2020
Niskanen	Safe D	June 7, 2020

==== Results ====
Illinois's 2nd congressional district, 2020
Party	Candidate	Votes	%	±%
Democratic	Robin Kelly (incumbent)	234,896	78.81	−2.24%
Republican	Theresa Raborn	63,142	21.19	+2.25%
Total votes		298,038	100.0	
Democratic hold				

== District 3 ==
2020 Illinois's 3rd congressional district election
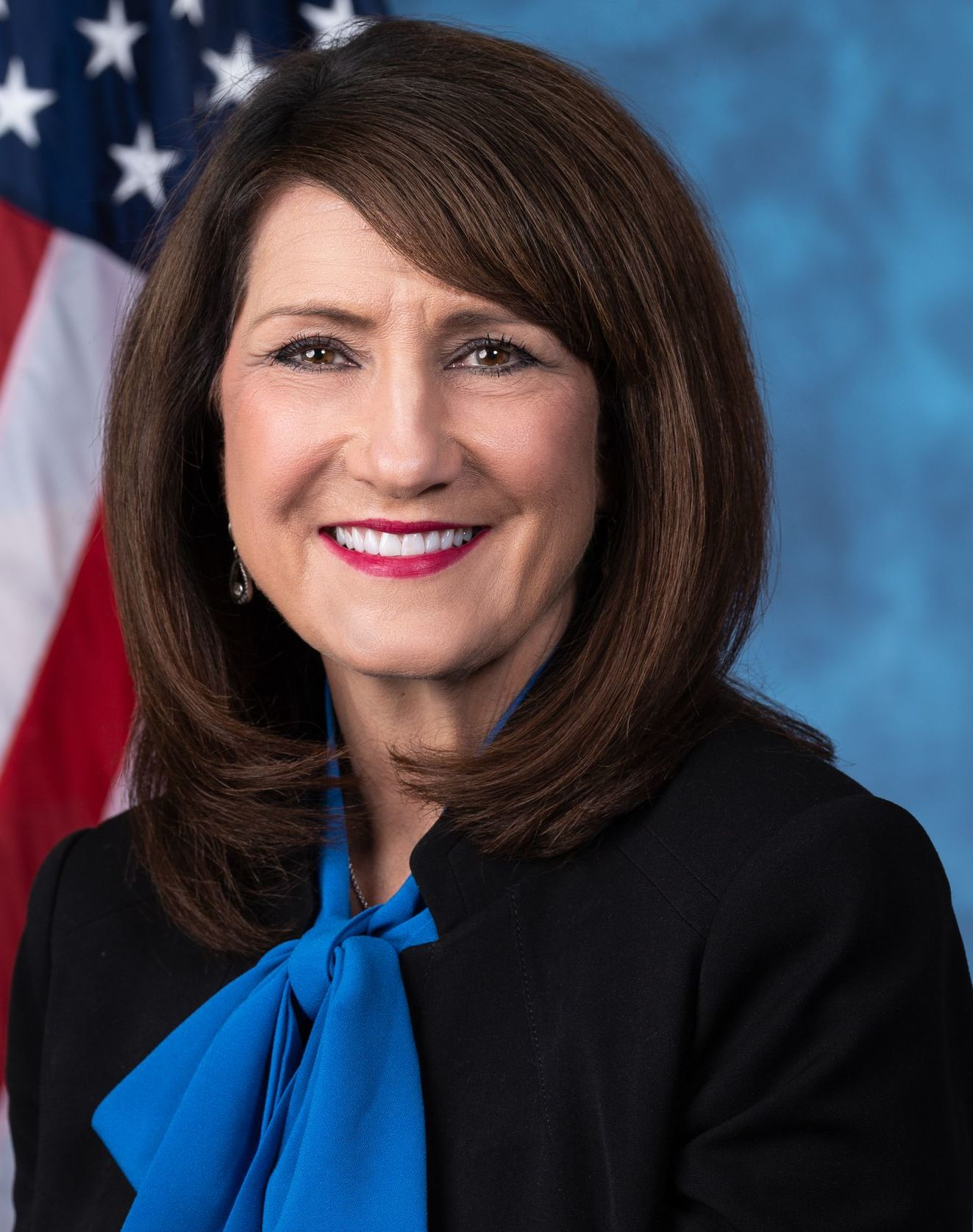

Nominee	Marie Newman	Mike Fricilone
Party	Democratic	Republican
Popular vote	172,997	133,851
Percentage	56.4%	43.7%
- County results Newman: 50–60% Fricilone: 50–60%
U.S. Representative before election
Dan Lipinski
Democratic
Elected U.S. Representative
Marie Newman
Democratic

The 3rd district includes western and southwestern suburbs of Chicago as far as the DuPage County border, as well part of southwest Chicago itself. The incumbent was Democrat Dan Lipinski, who was re-elected with 73.0% of the vote in 2018. On March 17, 2020, Marie Newman defeated Dan Lipinski in the Democratic primary in a rematch of their 2018 race.

=== Democratic primary ===
==== Candidates ====
===== Nominee =====
- Marie Newman, businesswoman and candidate for Illinois's 3rd congressional district in 2018

===== Eliminated in primary =====
- Rush Darwish, photographer and former broadcaster
- Charles Hughes
- Dan Lipinski, incumbent U.S. representative

===== Withdrawn =====
- Abe Matthew, attorney (endorsed Newman)

===== Endorsements =====
Dan Lipinski

U.S. representatives

- Cheri Bustos, Chair of the Democratic Congressional Campaign Committee, representative from Illinois's 17th congressional district

Newspapers

- Chicago Tribune

Organizations

- American Federation of State, County and Municipal Employees Council 31
- American Train Dispatchers Association
- Brotherhood of Locomotive Engineers and Trainmen
- Brotherhood of Maintenance of Way Employees
- Brotherhood of Railroad Signalmen
- Chicago Federation of Labor
- Chicago Fraternal Order of Police Lodge No. 7
- Democratic Congressional Campaign Committee
- Democrats for Life
- Illinois AFL–CIO
- International Association of Sheet Metal, Air, Rail and Transportation Workers
- International Brotherhood of Electrical Workers (IBEW) Local 134
- National Right to Life
- Susan B. Anthony List
- Transportation Communications Union / International Association of Machinists and Aerospace Workers

Individuals

- James Zogby, founder and president of the Arab American Institute, former member of the executive committee of the Democratic National Committee
Marie Newman

U.S. senators

- Cory Booker, U.S. senator from New Jersey and former candidate in the 2020 Democratic Party presidential primaries
- Kirsten Gillibrand, U.S. senator from New York and former candidate in the 2020 Democratic Party presidential primaries
- Bernie Sanders, U.S. senator from Vermont and candidate in the 2020 Democratic Party presidential primaries
- Elizabeth Warren, U.S. senator from Massachusetts and former candidate in the 2020 Democratic Party presidential primaries

U.S. representatives

- Pramila Jayapal, representative from Washington's 7th congressional district, Co-Chair of the Congressional Progressive Caucus
- Alexandria Ocasio-Cortez, representative from New York's 14th congressional district
- Mark Pocan, U.S. representative from WI-2 (2013–present), Co-Chair of the Congressional Progressive Caucus
- Ayanna Pressley, representative from Massachusetts's 7th congressional district
- Jan Schakowsky, representative from Illinois's 9th congressional district

State legislators

- Kelly Cassidy, Illinois state representative for the 14th district
- Laura Fine, Illinois state senator for the 9th district
- Will Guzzardi, Illinois state representative for the 44th district
- Elizabeth Hernandez, Illinois state representative for the 24th district
- Toi Hutchinson, former Illinois state senator for the 40th district
- Theresa Mah, Illinois state representative for the 2nd district
- Delia Ramirez, Illinois state representative for the 4th district
- Ann Williams, Illinois state representative for the 11th district

Municipal officials

- George Cardenas, alderman for Chicago's 12th ward
- Stephanie Coleman, alderman for Chicago's 16th ward
- Maria Hadden, alderman for Chicago's 49th ward
- Lori Lightfoot, Mayor of Chicago
- Carlos Ramirez-Rosa, alderman for Chicago's 35th ward
- Mike Rodriguez, alderman for Chicago's 22nd ward
- Byron Sigcho-Lopez, alderman for Chicago's 25th ward
- Anna M. Valencia, city clerk of Chicago
- Andre Vasquez, alderman for Chicago's 40th ward

Publications

- The Chicago Sun-Times

Unions

- American Postal Workers Union Local 604-605
- SEIU Illinois State Council

Organizations

- Democracy for America
- Emily's List
- Giffords
- Human Rights Campaign (post-primary)
- Illinois NOW
- Indivisible Brookfield
- Indivisible Chicago
- Justice Democrats
- League of Conservation Voters Action Fund
- MoveOn
- NARAL Pro-Choice America
- National Women's Political Caucus
- Our Revolution Chicago-Southwest Side
- Peace Action
- Planned Parenthood Action Fund
- Population Connection Action Fund
- Progressive Change Campaign Committee
- Progressive Democrats of America
- Richard Stallman
- Sierra Club
- Sunrise Movement

==== Polling ====
Poll source	Date(s) administered	Sample size (Note: Key: A – all adults RV – registered voters LV – likely voters V – unclear)	Margin of error	Dan Lipinski	Marie Newman	Rush Darwish	Charles Hughes	Undecided
Expedition Strategies (D) (Note: Poll sponsored by the Dan Lipinski campaign)	January 7–9, 2020	500 (LV)	± 4.4%	47%	25%	2%	1%	26%

==== Primary results ====
Democratic primary results
Party	Candidate	Votes	%
Democratic	Marie Newman	52,384	47.3
Democratic	Dan Lipinski (incumbent)	49,568	44.7
Democratic	Rush Darwish	6,351	5.7
Democratic	Charles Hughes	2,549	2.3
Total votes		110,852	100.0

=== Republican primary ===
==== Candidates ====
===== Nominee =====
- Mike Fricilone, Republican minority leader of the Will County Board

===== Eliminated in primary =====
- Arthur Jones, former chairman of the American Nazi Party, Holocaust denier, white supremacist, and nominee for Illinois's 3rd congressional district in 2018
- Catherine O'Shea, real estate broker

===== Endorsements =====
Mike Fricilone

State legislators

- Bill Brady, Minority Leader of Illinois Senate
- Jim Durkin, Minority Leader of Illinois House of Representatives

Newspapers

- Chicago Sun-Times
- Chicago Tribune

Unions

- Chicago Police Union

==== Primary results ====
Republican primary results
Party	Candidate	Votes	%
Republican	Mike Fricilone	9,804	57.5
Republican	Catherine O'Shea	5,541	32.5
Republican	Arthur Jones	1,708	10.0
Republican	Richard Mayers	2	0.0
Total votes		17,055	100.0

=== General election ===
==== Predictions ====
Source	Ranking	As of
The Cook Political Report	Safe D	October 21, 2020
Inside Elections	Safe D	October 16, 2020
Sabato's Crystal Ball	Safe D	October 20, 2020
Politico	Safe D	October 11, 2020
Daily Kos	Safe D	October 26, 2020
RCP	Safe D	October 28, 2020
Niskanen	Safe D	June 7, 2020

==== Polling ====
Poll source	Date(s) administered	Sample size	Margin of error	Marie Newman (D)	Mike Fricilone (R)	Other
Ogden & Fry (R)	September 7, 2020	759 (LV)	± 3.63%	46%	44%	10% (Note: "Other or Undecided" with 10%)

==== Results ====
Illinois's 3rd congressional district, 2020
Party	Candidate	Votes	%	±%
Democratic	Marie Newman	172,997	56.38	−16.63%
Republican	Mike Fricilone	133,851	43.67	+17.75%
Total votes		306,848	100.0	
Democratic hold				

== District 4 ==
2020 Illinois's 4th congressional district election
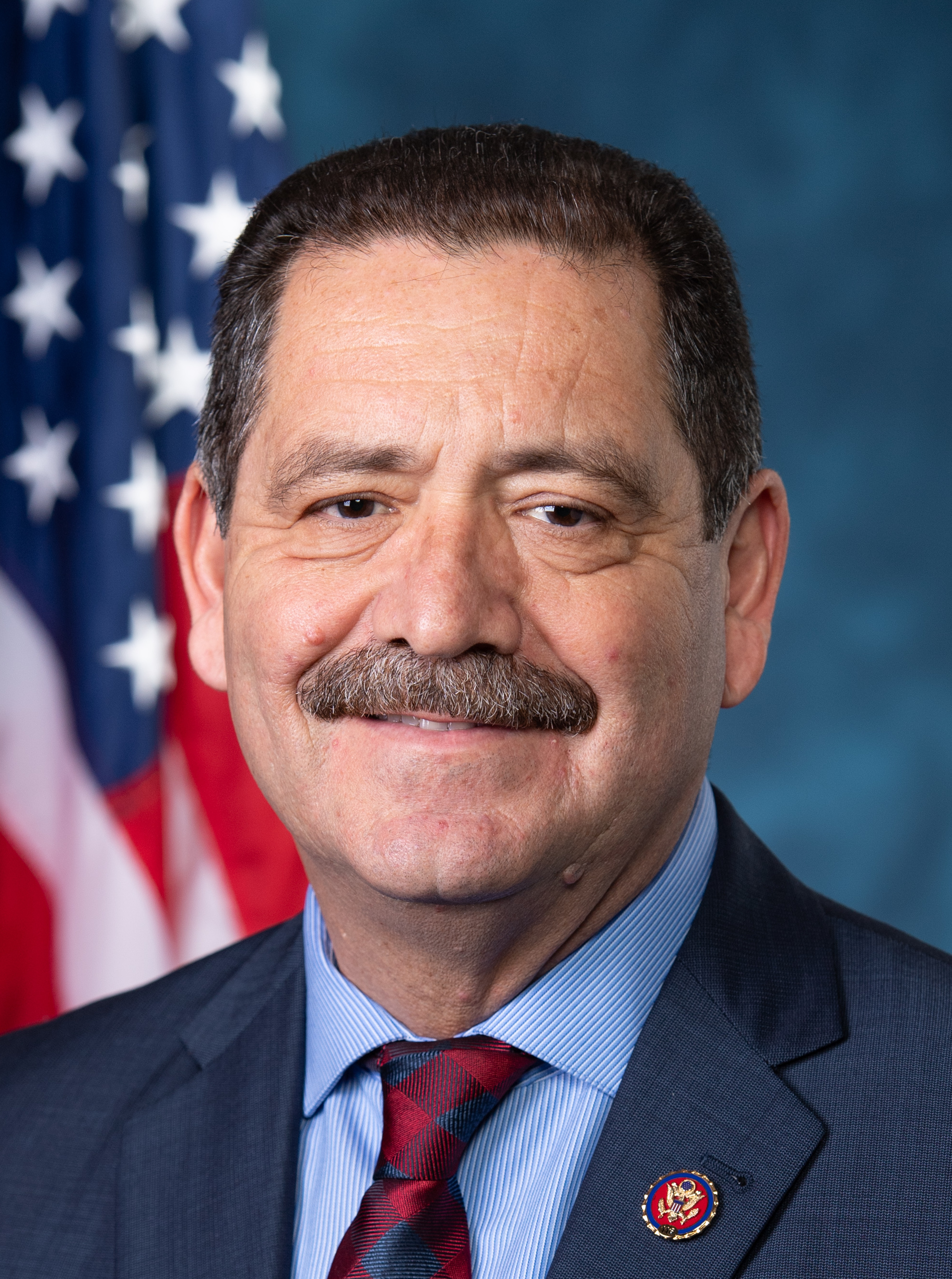

Nominee	Jesús "Chuy" García	Jesus E. Solorio Jr.
Party	Democratic	Republican
Popular vote	187,219	35,518
Percentage	84.0%	16.0%
- County results Garcia: 80–90%
U.S. Representative before election
Jesús "Chuy" García
Democratic
Elected U.S. Representative
Jesús "Chuy" García
Democratic

The 4th district takes in the heavily Hispanic areas of West Side and South Side Chicago. The incumbent was Democrat Chuy García, who was elected with 86.6% of the vote in 2018.

=== Democratic primary ===
==== Candidates ====
===== Nominee =====
- Chuy García, incumbent U.S. representative

==== Primary results ====
Democratic primary results
Party	Candidate	Votes	%
Democratic	Jesús "Chuy" García (incumbent)	88,874	100.0
Total votes		88,874	100.0

=== Republican primary ===
==== Candidates ====
Christopher Lasky was originally the only Republican candidate to file, and was the sole Republican candidate in the primary. Lasky died on December 23, 2019, but remained on the ballot as the only candidate winning the nomination, and the Illinois Republican Party nominated Jesus Solorio as his replacement.

===== Nominee =====
- Jesus E. Solorio Jr., Chicago Republican Party vice-chair and 23rd Ward Republican committeeman (nominated by party)

===== Winner in primary =====
- Christopher Lasky, former member of the board of trustees for the Stickney-Forest View Public Library District (deceased, December 23, 2019)

==== Primary results ====
Republican primary results
Party	Candidate	Votes	%
Republican	Christopher Lasky	4,059	100.0
Total votes		4,059	100.0

=== General election ===
==== Predictions ====
Source	Ranking	As of
The Cook Political Report	Safe D	October 21, 2020
Inside Elections	Safe D	October 16, 2020
Sabato's Crystal Ball	Safe D	October 20, 2020
Politico	Safe D	October 11, 2020
Daily Kos	Safe D	October 26, 2020
RCP	Safe D	October 28, 2020
Niskanen	Safe D	June 7, 2020

==== Results ====
Illinois's 4th congressional district, 2020
Party	Candidate	Votes	%	±%
Democratic	Jesús "Chuy" García (incumbent)	187,219	84.05	−2.54%
Republican	Jesus E. Solorio Jr.	35,518	15.95	+2.54%
Total votes		222,737	100.0	
Democratic hold				

== District 5 ==
2020 Illinois's 5th congressional district election
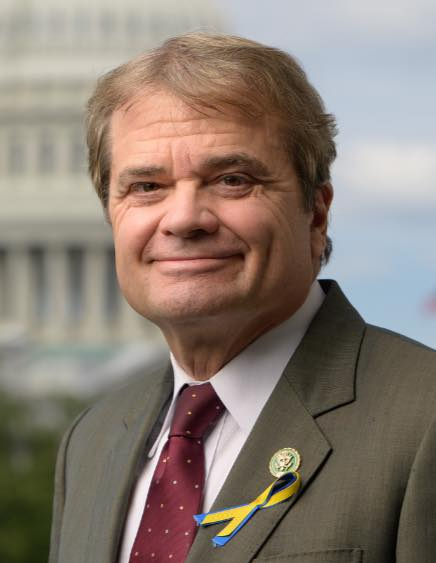

Nominee	Mike Quigley	Tom Hanson
Party	Democratic	Republican
Popular vote	255,661	96,200
Percentage	70.8%	26.6%
- County results Quigley: 50–60% 70–80%
U.S. Representative before election
Mike Quigley
Democratic
Elected U.S. Representative
Mike Quigley
Democratic

The 5th district is based in North Side Chicago and its northern and western suburbs, including Elmhurst, Elmwood Park, Franklin Park, Hinsdale, La Grange Park, Norridge, Northlake, River Grove, Schiller Park, and Oakbrook Terrace. The incumbent was Democrat Mike Quigley, who was re-elected with 76.7% of the vote in 2018.

=== Democratic primary ===
==== Candidates ====
===== Nominee =====
- Mike Quigley, incumbent U.S. representative

===== Eliminated in primary =====
- Brian Burns, attorney

==== Primary results ====
Democratic primary results
Party	Candidate	Votes	%
Democratic	Mike Quigley (incumbent)	97,865	75.1
Democratic	Brian Burns	32,440	24.9
Total votes		130,305	100.0

=== Republican primary ===
==== Candidates ====
===== Nominee =====
- Tom Hanson, nominee for Illinois's 5th congressional district in 2018

===== Eliminated in primary =====
- Kimball Ladien

==== Primary results ====
Republican primary results
Party	Candidate	Votes	%
Republican	Tom Hanson	9,764	83.1
Republican	Kimball Ladien	1,993	16.9
Total votes		11,757	100.0

=== General election ===
==== Predictions ====
Source	Ranking	As of
The Cook Political Report	Safe D	October 21, 2020
Inside Elections	Safe D	October 16, 2020
Sabato's Crystal Ball	Safe D	October 20, 2020
Politico	Safe D	October 11, 2020
Daily Kos	Safe D	October 26, 2020
RCP	Safe D	October 28, 2020
Niskanen	Safe D	June 7, 2020

==== Results ====
Illinois's 5th congressional district, 2020
Party	Candidate	Votes	%	±%
Democratic	Mike Quigley (incumbent)	255,661	70.77	−5.89%
Republican	Tom Hanson	96,200	26.63	+3.30%
Green	Thomas J. Wilda	9,408	2.60	N/A
Write-in		2	0.00	N/A
Total votes		361,271	100.0	
Democratic hold				

== District 6 ==
2020 Illinois's 6th congressional district election
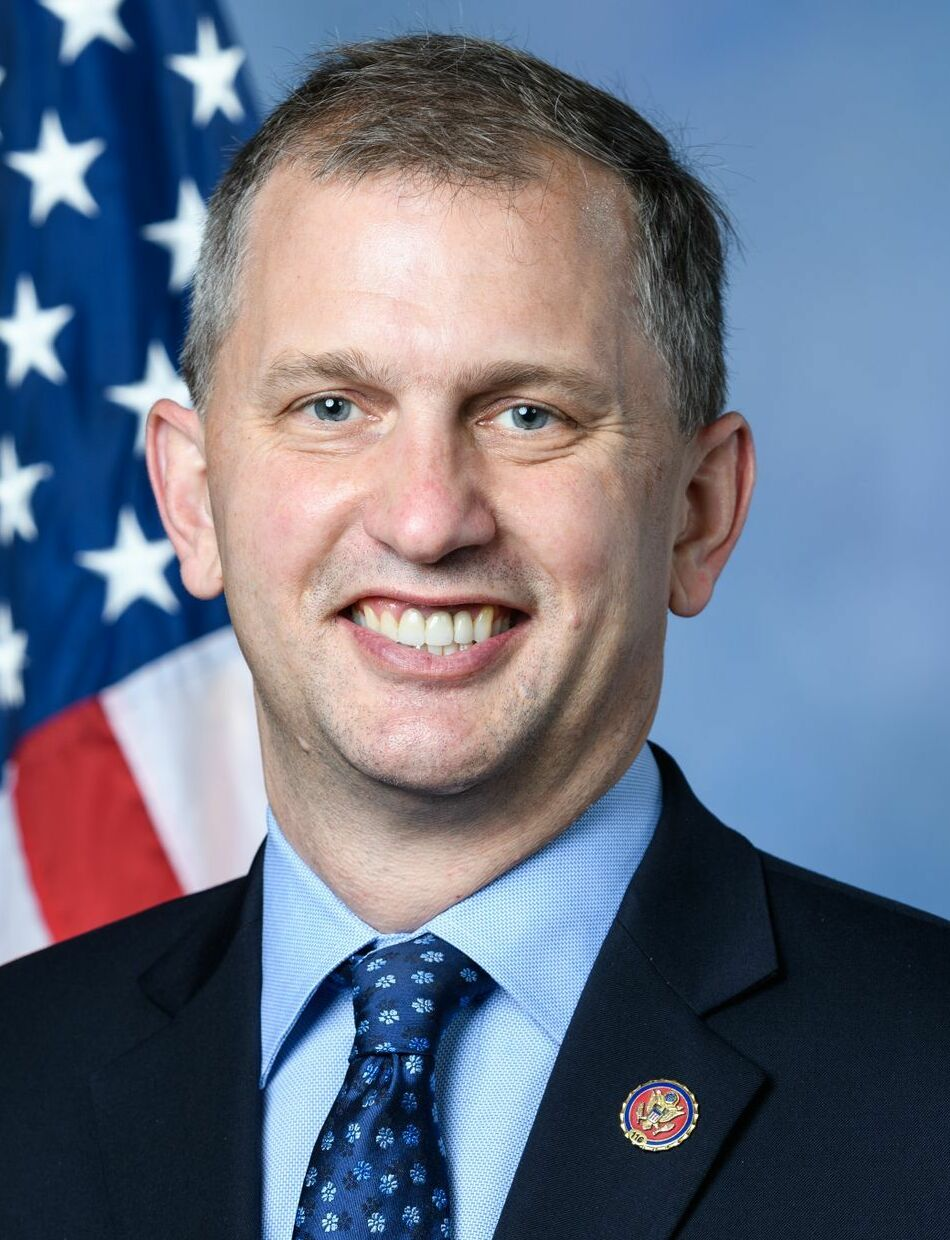

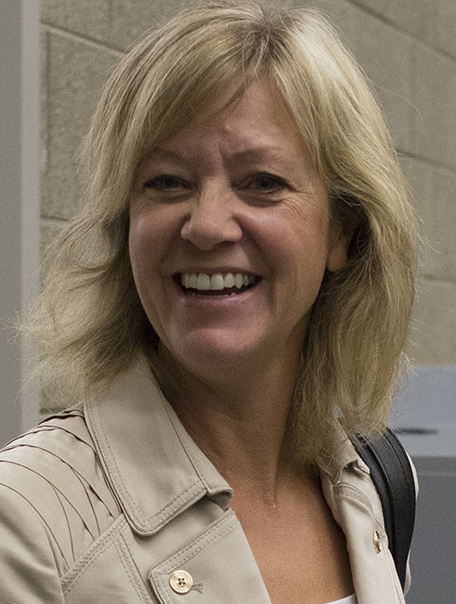
Nominee	Sean Casten	Jeanne Ives
Party	Democratic	Republican
Popular vote	213,777	183,891
Percentage	52.8%	45.4%
- County results Casten: 40–50% 50–60% Ives: 50–60%
U.S. Representative before election
Sean Casten
Democratic
Elected U.S. Representative
Sean Casten
Democratic

The 6th district encompasses the western Chicago suburbs, and includes parts of Cook, DuPage, Lake, Kane, and McHenry counties. The incumbent was Democrat Sean Casten, who flipped the district and was elected with 53.6% of the vote in 2018.

=== Democratic primary ===
==== Candidates ====
===== Nominee =====
- Sean Casten, incumbent U.S. representative

==== Endorsements ====
Sean Casten

Former U.S. Executive Branch officials

- Barack Obama, 44th president of the United States

U.S. senators

- Tammy Duckworth, US Senator from Illinois
- Dick Durbin, US Senator from Illinois
- Elizabeth Warren, US Senator from Massachusetts and former US presidential candidate in 2020

Organizations

- 314 Action
- End Citizens United
- J Street PAC
- League of Conservation Voters Action Fund
- NARAL Pro-Choice America
- Planned Parenthood Action Fund
- Population Connection
- Sierra Club

Individuals

- Pat Brady, former Chair of the Illinois Republican Party

==== Primary results ====
Democratic primary results
Party	Candidate	Votes	%
Democratic	Sean Casten (incumbent)	82,909	100.0
Total votes		82,909	100.0

=== Republican primary ===
==== Candidates ====
===== Nominee =====
- Jeanne Ives, former state representative and Republican primary candidate for Governor of Illinois in 2018

===== Eliminated in primary =====
- Jay Kinzler, transplant surgeon and U.S. Army Reserve colonel

===== Withdrawn =====
- Evelyn Sanguinetti, former lieutenant governor of Illinois

===== Declined =====
- Greg Hart, DuPage County board member

==== Endorsements ====
Jeanne Ives

U.S. senators

- Ted Cruz, U.S. senator from Texas

U.S. representatives

- Jim Jordan, U.S. representative from Ohio's 4th congressional district
- Kevin McCarthy, House Minority Leader and U.S. Representative from California's 23rd congressional district
- Peter Roskam, former U.S. representative from Illinois's 6th congressional district

Cabinet-level officials

- Mark Meadows, current White House Chief of Staff

Newspapers

- Chicago Tribune

Individuals

- Stephen Moore, writer and co-founder of Club for Growth

Organizations

- Club for Growth
- FreedomWorks
- House Freedom Fund
- National Federation of Independent Business
- National Republican Congressional Committee
- Susan B. Anthony List
- U.S. Chamber of Commerce

==== Primary results ====
Republican primary results
Party	Candidate	Votes	%
Republican	Jeanne Ives	29,144	70.9
Republican	Jay Kinzler	12,017	29.1
Republican	Richard Mayers	1	0.0
Total votes		41,162	100.0

=== General election ===
==== Predictions ====
Source	Ranking	As of
The Cook Political Report	Safe D	October 21, 2020
Inside Elections	Safe D	October 16, 2020
Sabato's Crystal Ball	Safe D	October 20, 2020
Politico	Likely D	October 11, 2020
Daily Kos	Safe D	October 29, 2020
RCP	Likely D	October 28, 2020
Niskanen	Safe D	June 7, 2020

==== Polling ====
Poll source	Date(s) administered	Sample size	Margin of error	Sean Casten (D)	Jeanne Ives (R)	Undecided
Ogden & Fry (R) (Note: Poll sponsored by Jeanne Ives' campaign)	December 17, 2019	575 (LV)	± 4.17%	38%	47%	16%

Hypothetical polling

with Generic Democrat and Generic Republican

Poll source	Date(s) administered	Sample size	Margin of error	Generic Democrat	Generic Republican	Undecided
Ogden & Fry/Jeanne for Congress	December 17, 2019	575 (LV)	± 4.17%	49%	43%	8%

==== Results ====
Illinois's 6th congressional district, 2020
Party	Candidate	Votes	%	±%
Democratic	Sean Casten (incumbent)	213,777	52.82	−0.75%
Republican	Jeanne Ives	183,891	45.43	−0.99%
Libertarian	Bill Redpath	7,079	1.75	N/A
Total votes		404,747	100.0	
Democratic hold				

== District 7 ==
2020 Illinois's 7th congressional district election
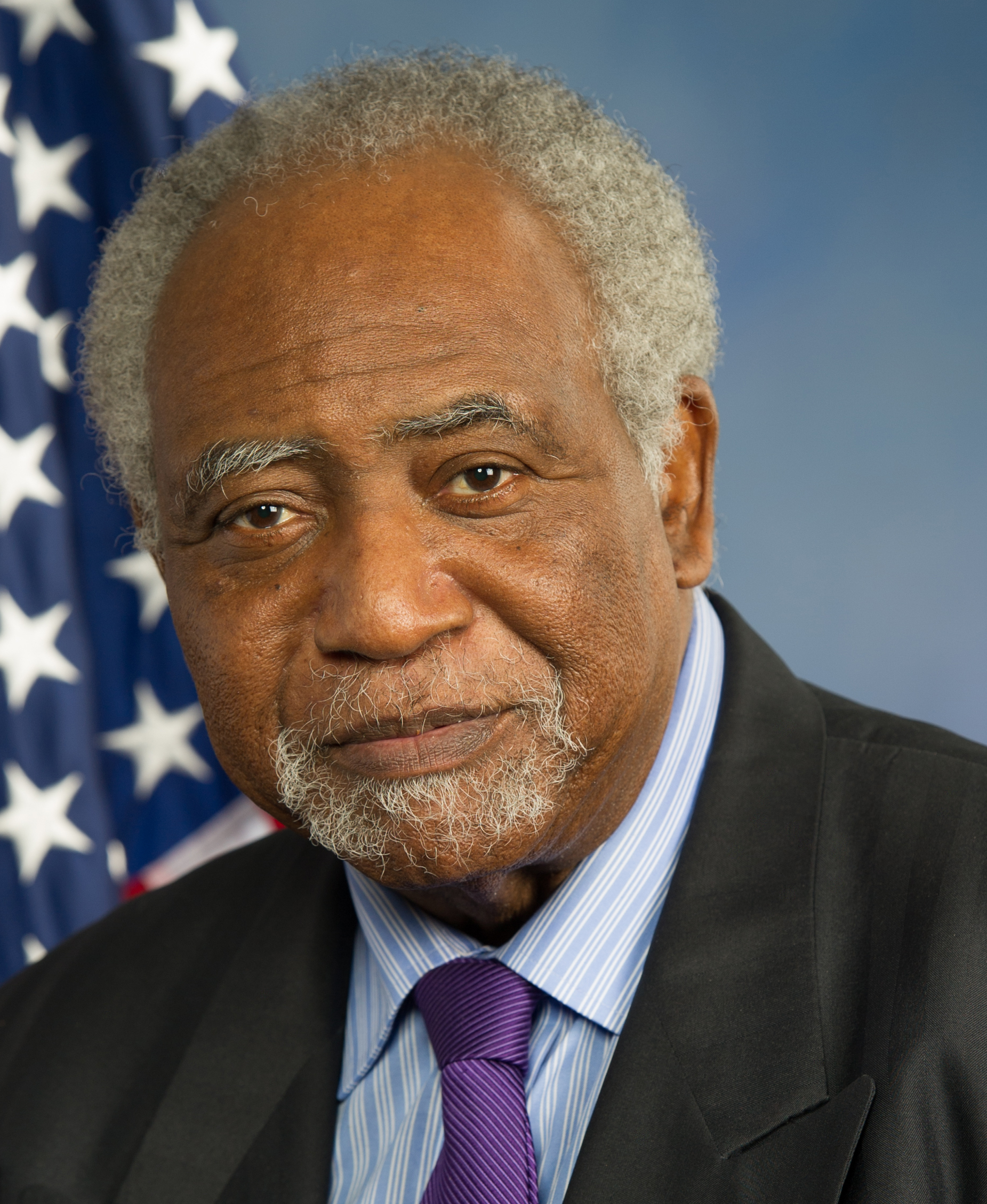

Nominee	Danny K. Davis	Craig Cameron	Tracy Jennings
Party	Democratic	Republican	Independent
Popular vote	249,383	41,390	19,355
Percentage	80.4%	13.4%	6.2%
- County results Davis: 80–90%
U.S. Representative before election
Danny K. Davis
Democratic
Elected U.S. Representative
Danny K. Davis
Democratic

The 7th district encompasses West Side Chicago and downtown Chicago, including Bellwood, Forest Park, Oak Park, Maywood, and Westchester. The incumbent was Democrat Danny K. Davis, who was re-elected with 87.6% of the vote in 2018.

=== Democratic primary ===
==== Candidates ====
===== Nominee =====
- Danny K. Davis, incumbent U.S. representative

===== Eliminated in primary =====
- Anthony Clark, teacher, community activist, and candidate for Illinois's 7th congressional district in 2018
- Kina Collins, community organizer and gun control activist
- Kristine Schanbacher, attorney

==== Endorsements ====
Anthony Clark

Local officials

- Rossana Rodriguez-Sanchez, Chicago, Illinois alderwoman from Ward 33 since 2019

Notable individuals

- Cori Bush, activist, organizer, nurse, pastor, Democratic candidate for U.S. Representative from MO-01(2018, 2020)
- Paula Jean Swearengin, social and environmental activist; candidate for U.S. Senate from West Virginia in 2018 and 2020

Newspapers

- The Chicago Sun-Times

Organizations

- Brand New Congress
- Democratic Socialists of America - Chicago, Illinois, chapter
- Our Revolution - Buffalo Grove, Illinois, chapter
- The People for Bernie Sanders
Kina Collins

Organizations

- Blue America
- Center for Popular Democracy
- Good Kids Mad City
- Illinois Youth Climate Strike
- Northside Democracy for America

Elected officials

- Katie Avalos, member of the Illinois District 90 school board
- Erika Bachner, River Forest Village Trustee
- Susan Buchanan, Oak Park Village Trustee
- Patty Henek, River Forest Village Trustee
- Anna Moeller, Illinois House Representative for the 43rd district
- Jackie Moore, president of the Illinois District 200 school board
- Jeanette Taylor, alderman for the 20th ward in Chicago City Council
- Arti Walker-Peddakotla, Oak Park Village Trustee

Individuals

- Channyn Lynne Parker, transgender rights activist
Danny K. Davis

Organizations

- J Street PAC
- Planned Parenthood Action Fund
- Sierra Club

==== Primary results ====
Democratic primary results
Party	Candidate	Votes	%
Democratic	Danny K. Davis (incumbent)	79,813	60.2
Democratic	Kina Collins	18,399	13.8
Democratic	Anthony Clark	17,206	13.0
Democratic	Kristine Schanbacher	17,187	13.0
Total votes		132,605	100.0

=== Republican primary ===
==== Candidates ====
===== Nominee =====
- Craig Cameron, candidate for Illinois's 7th congressional district in 2018

==== Primary results ====
Republican primary results
Party	Candidate	Votes	%
Republican	Craig Cameron	3,799	100.0
Total votes		3,799	100.0

=== Third parties ===
==== Candidates ====
- Tracy Jennings (independent), former public service administrator

=== General election ===
==== Predictions ====
Source	Ranking	As of
The Cook Political Report	Safe D	October 21, 2020
Inside Elections	Safe D	October 16, 2020
Sabato's Crystal Ball	Safe D	October 20, 2020
Politico	Safe D	October 11, 2020
Daily Kos	Safe D	October 26, 2020
RCP	Safe D	October 28, 2020
Niskanen	Safe D	June 7, 2020

==== Results ====
Illinois's 7th congressional district, 2020
Party	Candidate	Votes	%	±%
Democratic	Danny K. Davis (incumbent)	249,383	80.41	−7.21%
Republican	Craig Cameron	41,390	13.35	+0.97%
Independent	Tracy Jennings	19,355	6.24	N/A
Total votes		310,128	100.0	
Democratic hold				

== District 8 ==
2020 Illinois's 8th congressional district election
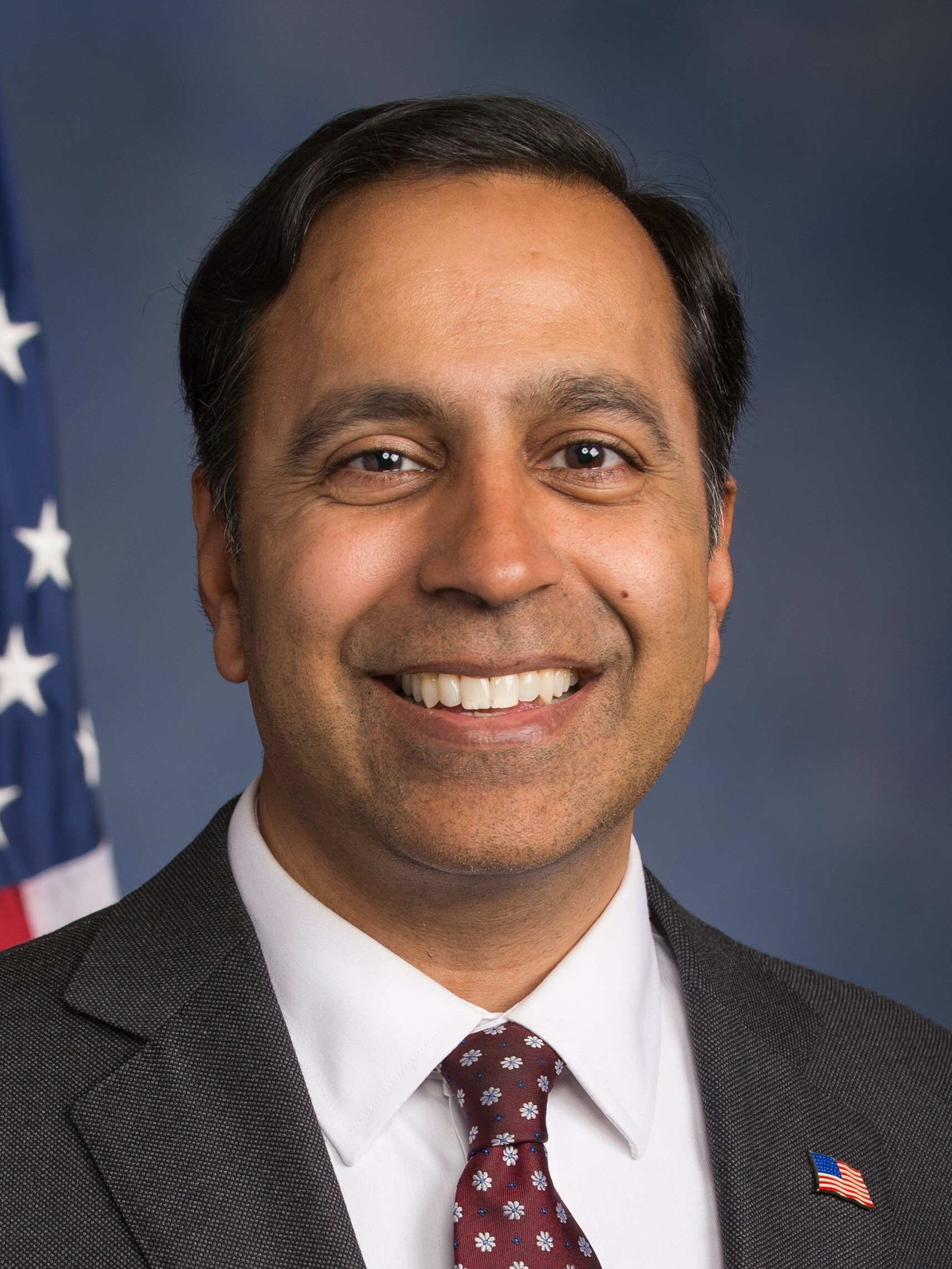

Nominee	Raja Krishnamoorthi	Preston Gabriel Nelson
Party	Democratic	Libertarian
Popular vote	186,251	68,327
Percentage	73.2%	26.8%
- County results Krishnamoorthi: 70–80%
U.S. Representative before election
Raja Krishnamoorthi
Democratic
Elected U.S. Representative
Raja Krishnamoorthi
Democratic

The 8th district is based in the northwestern suburbs of Chicago. The incumbent was Democrat Raja Krishnamoorthi, who was re-elected with 66.0% of the vote in 2018.

=== Democratic primary ===
==== Candidates ====
===== Nominee =====
- Raja Krishnamoorthi, incumbent U.S. representative

===== Eliminated in primary =====
- Inam Hussain, social worker
- William Olson

==== Primary results ====
Democratic primary results
Party	Candidate	Votes	%
Democratic	Raja Krishnamoorthi (incumbent)	51,829	79.9
Democratic	William Olson	8,441	13.0
Democratic	Inam Hussain	4,563	7.1
Total votes		64,833	100.0

=== Republican primary ===
==== Write-in candidates ====
- Joseph J Hantsch
- Richard Mayers

==== Primary results ====
Republican primary results
Party	Candidate	Votes	%
Republican	Joseph J Hantsch (write-in)	211	99.1
Republican	Richard Mayers (write-in)	2	0.9
Total votes		213	100.0

=== Third Parties ===
==== Libertarian Party ====
===== Nominee =====
- Preston Gabriel Nelson, inventor

=== General election ===
==== Predictions ====
Source	Ranking	As of
The Cook Political Report	Safe D	October 21, 2020
Inside Elections	Safe D	October 16, 2020
Sabato's Crystal Ball	Safe D	October 20, 2020
Politico	Safe D	October 11, 2020
Daily Kos	Safe D	October 26, 2020
RCP	Safe D	October 28, 2020
Niskanen	Safe D	June 7, 2020

==== Results ====
Illinois's 8th congressional district, 2020
Party	Candidate	Votes	%	±%
Democratic	Raja Krishnamoorthi (incumbent)	186,251	73.16	+7.19%
Libertarian	Preston Gabriel Nelson	68,327	26.84	N/A
Total votes		254,578	100.0	
Democratic hold				

== District 9 ==
2020 Illinois's 9th congressional district election
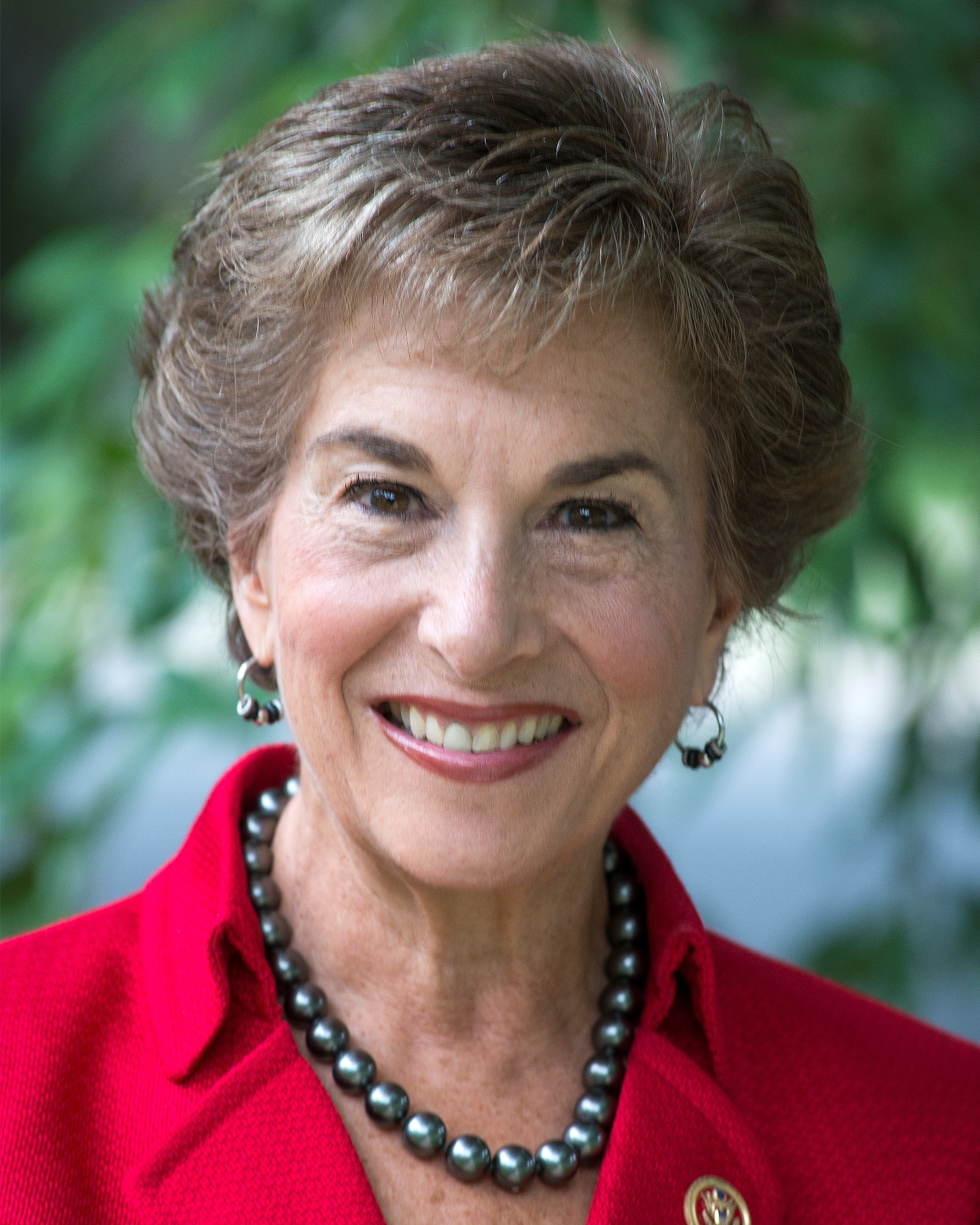

Nominee	Jan Schakowsky	Sargis Sangari
Party	Democratic	Republican
Popular vote	262,045	107,125
Percentage	71.0%	29.0%
- County results Schakowsky: 70–80%
U.S. Representative before election
Jan Schakowsky
Democratic
Elected U.S. Representative
Jan Schakowsky
Democratic

The 9th district is based in the northern Chicago suburbs, including all or parts of Arlington Heights, Des Plaines, Evanston, Glenview, Lincolnwood, Morton Grove, Mount Prospect, Niles, Park Ridge, Prospect Heights, Skokie, Wilmette, and Winnetka. The incumbent was Democrat Jan Schakowsky, who was re-elected with 73.5% of the vote in 2018.

=== Democratic primary ===
==== Candidates ====
===== Nominee =====
- Jan Schakowsky, incumbent U.S. representative

=== Democratic primary ===
==== Primary results ====
Democratic primary results
Party	Candidate	Votes	%
Democratic	Jan Schakowsky (incumbent)	127,467	99.7
Democratic	Andrew Heldut (write-in)	355	0.3
Total votes		127,822	100.0

=== Republican primary ===
==== Candidates ====
===== Nominee =====
- Sargis Sangari, former U.S. Army lieutenant colonel

==== Primary results ====
Republican primary results
Party	Candidate	Votes	%
Republican	Sargis Sangari	11,809	100.0
Republican	Richard Mayers (write-in)	1	0.0
Total votes		11,809	100.0

=== General election ===
==== Predictions ====
Source	Ranking	As of
The Cook Political Report	Safe D	October 21, 2020
Inside Elections	Safe D	October 16, 2020
Sabato's Crystal Ball	Safe D	October 20, 2020
Politico	Safe D	October 11, 2020
Daily Kos	Safe D	October 26, 2020
RCP	Safe D	October 28, 2020
Niskanen	Safe D	June 7, 2020

==== Results ====
Illinois's 9th congressional district, 2020
Party	Candidate	Votes	%	±%
Democratic	Jan Schakowsky (incumbent)	262,045	70.98	−2.51%
Republican	Sargis Sangari	107,125	29.02	+2.51%
Total votes		369,170	100.0	
Democratic hold				

== District 10 ==
2020 Illinois's 10th congressional district election
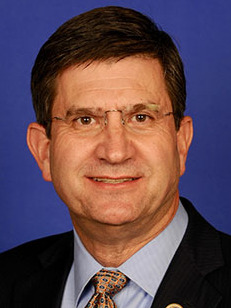

Nominee	Brad Schneider	Valerie Ramirez Mukherjee
Party	Democratic	Republican
Popular vote	202,402	114,442
Percentage	63.9%	36.1%
- County results Schneider: 60–70%
U.S. Representative before election
Brad Schneider
Democratic
Elected U.S. Representative
Brad Schneider
Democratic

The 10th district encompasses the North Shore and the northwestern suburbs of Chicago. The incumbent was Democrat Brad Schneider, who was re-elected with 65.6% of the vote in 2018.

=== Democratic primary ===
==== Candidates ====
===== Nominee =====
- Brad Schneider, incumbent U.S. representative

===== Withdrawn =====
- Andrew Wang, progressive activist

==== Primary results ====
Democratic primary results
Party	Candidate	Votes	%
Democratic	Brad Schneider (incumbent)	79,126	99.9
Democratic	Adam Broad (write-in)	115	0.1
Total votes		79,241	100.0

=== Republican primary ===
==== Candidates ====
===== Nominee =====
- Valerie Ramirez Mukherjee, venture capitalist

==== Primary results ====
Republican primary results
Party	Candidate	Votes	%
Republican	Valerie Ramirez Mukherjee	14,877	100.0
Total votes		14,877	100.0

=== General election ===
==== Predictions ====
Source	Ranking	As of
The Cook Political Report	Safe D	October 21, 2020
Inside Elections	Safe D	October 16, 2020
Sabato's Crystal Ball	Safe D	October 20, 2020
Politico	Safe D	October 11, 2020
Daily Kos	Safe D	October 26, 2020
RCP	Safe D	October 28, 2020
Niskanen	Safe D	June 7, 2020

==== Results ====
Illinois's 10th congressional district, 2020
Party	Candidate	Votes	%	±%
Democratic	Brad Schneider (incumbent)	202,402	63.87	−1.72%
Republican	Valerie Ramirez Mukherjee	114,442	36.12	+1.71%
Write-in		30	0.01	N/A
Total votes		316,874	100.0	
Democratic hold				

== District 11 ==
2020 Illinois's 11th congressional district election
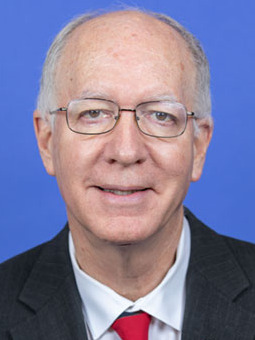

Nominee	Bill Foster	Rick Laib
Party	Democratic	Republican
Popular vote	194,557	112,807
Percentage	63.3%	36.7%
- County results Foster: 60–70% 70–80% Laib: 50–60%
U.S. Representative before election
Bill Foster
Democratic
Elected U.S. Representative
Bill Foster
Democratic

The 11th district covers the southwestern and western Chicago suburbs, including all or parts of Aurora, Bolingbrook, Darien, Joliet, Montgomery, Naperville, Lisle, Downers Grove, New Lenox, Shorewood, and Woodridge. The incumbent was Democrat Bill Foster, who was re-elected with 63.8% of the vote in 2018.

=== Democratic primary ===
==== Candidates ====
===== Nominee =====
- Bill Foster, incumbent U.S. representative

===== Eliminated in primary =====
- Rachel Ventura, Will County board member

==== Endorsements ====
Bill Foster

U.S. senators

- Dick Durbin, Senator from Illinois (1997-present)

Organizations

- 314 Action
- J Street PAC
- Planned Parenthood Action Fund
- Sierra Club

Labor unions

- Illinois AFL–CIO

Newspapers

- Chicago Sun-Times
- Chicago Tribune
Rachel Ventura

Individuals

- Paul Dillon, actor
- Michael Shannon, actor, director, and musician

Organizations

- Brand New Congress
- Democratic Socialists of America - West Suburban Illinois chapter
- Friends of the Earth Action
- Our Revolution
- Sunrise Movement - Chicago, Illinois chapter

==== Primary results ====
Results by county: Foster—60–70% Foster—50–60%

Democratic primary results
Party	Candidate	Votes	%
Democratic	Bill Foster (incumbent)	46,116	58.7
Democratic	Rachel Ventura	32,422	41.3
Total votes		78,538	100.0

=== Republican primary ===
==== Candidates ====
===== Nominee =====
- Rick Laib, police sergeant with the Will County Sheriff's Office

===== Eliminated in primary =====
- Krishna Bansal, member of the Naperville Zoning and Planning Commission

==== Endorsements ====
Rick Laib

Organizations

- Family Research Council
- National Right to Life Committee

==== Primary results ====
Republican primary results
Party	Candidate	Votes	%
Republican	Rick Laib	12,474	54.1
Republican	Krishna Bansal	10,603	45.9
Total votes		23,077	100.0

=== General election ===
==== Predictions ====
Source	Ranking	As of
The Cook Political Report	Safe D	October 21, 2020
Inside Elections	Safe D	October 16, 2020
Sabato's Crystal Ball	Safe D	October 20, 2020
Politico	Safe D	October 11, 2020
Daily Kos	Safe D	October 26, 2020
RCP	Safe D	October 28, 2020
Niskanen	Safe D	June 7, 2020

==== Results ====
Illinois's 11th congressional district, 2020
Party	Candidate	Votes	%	±%
Democratic	Bill Foster (incumbent)	194,557	63.30	−0.54%
Republican	Rick Laib	112,807	36.70	+0.54%
Write-in		13	0.00	N/A
Total votes		307,377	100.0	
Democratic hold				

== District 12 ==
2020 Illinois's 12th congressional district election
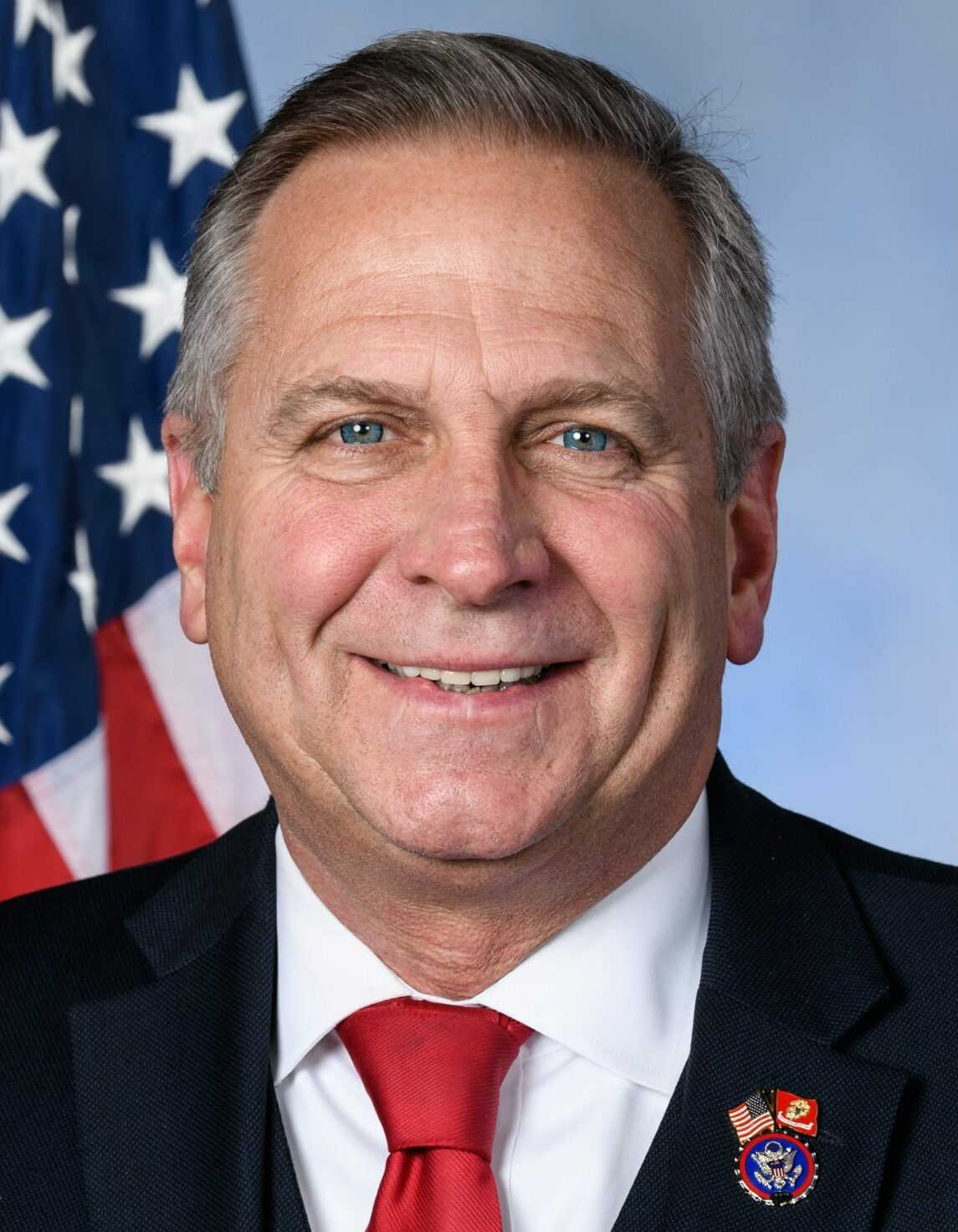

Nominee	Mike Bost	Raymond Lenzi
Party	Republican	Democratic
Popular vote	194,839	127,577
Percentage	60.4%	39.6%
- County results Bost: 50–60% 60–70% 70–80% Lenzi: 50–60%
U.S. Representative before election
Mike Bost
Republican
Elected U.S. Representative
Mike Bost
Republican

The 12th district takes in southwestern Illinois, taking in the suburbs of St. Louis and Metro Lakeland. The incumbent was Republican Mike Bost, who was re-elected with 51.6% of the vote in 2018.

=== Republican primary ===
==== Candidates ====
===== Nominee =====
- Mike Bost, incumbent U.S. representative

==== Primary results ====
Republican primary results
Party	Candidate	Votes	%
Republican	Mike Bost (incumbent)	40,222	100.0
Total votes		40,222	100.0

=== Democratic primary ===
==== Candidates ====
===== Nominee =====
- Raymond Lenzi, former chancellor of Southern Illinois University

===== Eliminated in primary =====
- Joel Funk, financial consultant and U.S. Army veteran

==== Primary results ====
Democratic primary results
Party	Candidate	Votes	%
Democratic	Raymond Lenzi	27,015	50.3
Democratic	Joel Funk	26,648	49.7
Total votes		53,663	100.0

=== General election ===
==== Predictions ====
Source	Ranking	As of
The Cook Political Report	Safe R	October 21, 2020
Inside Elections	Safe R	October 16, 2020
Sabato's Crystal Ball	Safe R	October 20, 2020
Politico	Lean R	October 11, 2020
Daily Kos	Safe R	October 26, 2020
RCP	Safe R	October 28, 2020
Niskanen	Safe R	June 7, 2020

==== Endorsements ====
Ray Lenzi (D)

Organizations

- Indivisible
- Sierra Club

==== Results ====
Illinois's 12th congressional district, 2020
Party	Candidate	Votes	%	±%
Republican	Mike Bost (incumbent)	194,839	60.43	+8.86%
Democratic	Raymond Lenzi	127,577	39.57	−5.82%
Total votes		322,416	100.0	
Republican hold				

== District 13 ==
2020 Illinois's 13th congressional district election
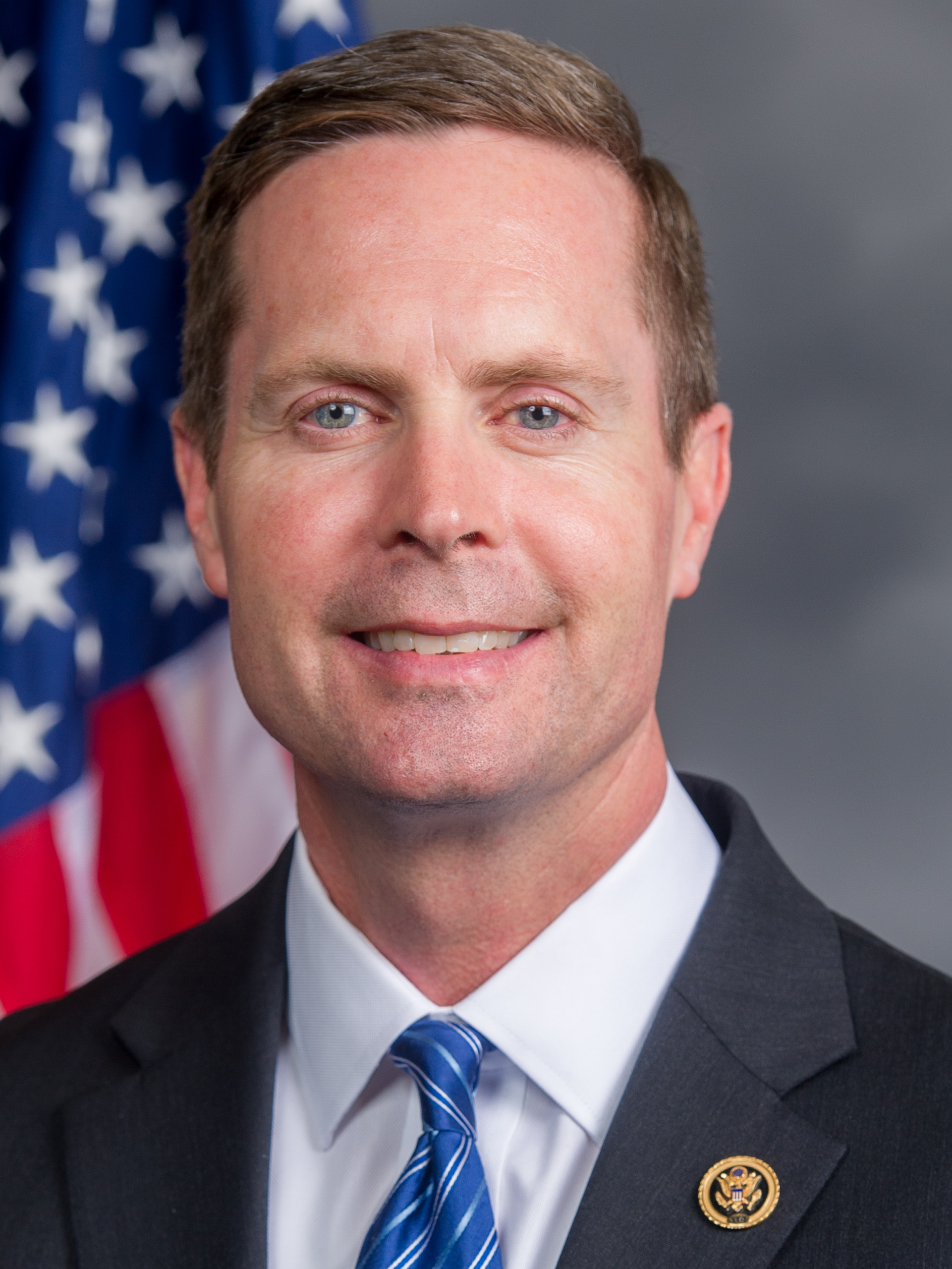

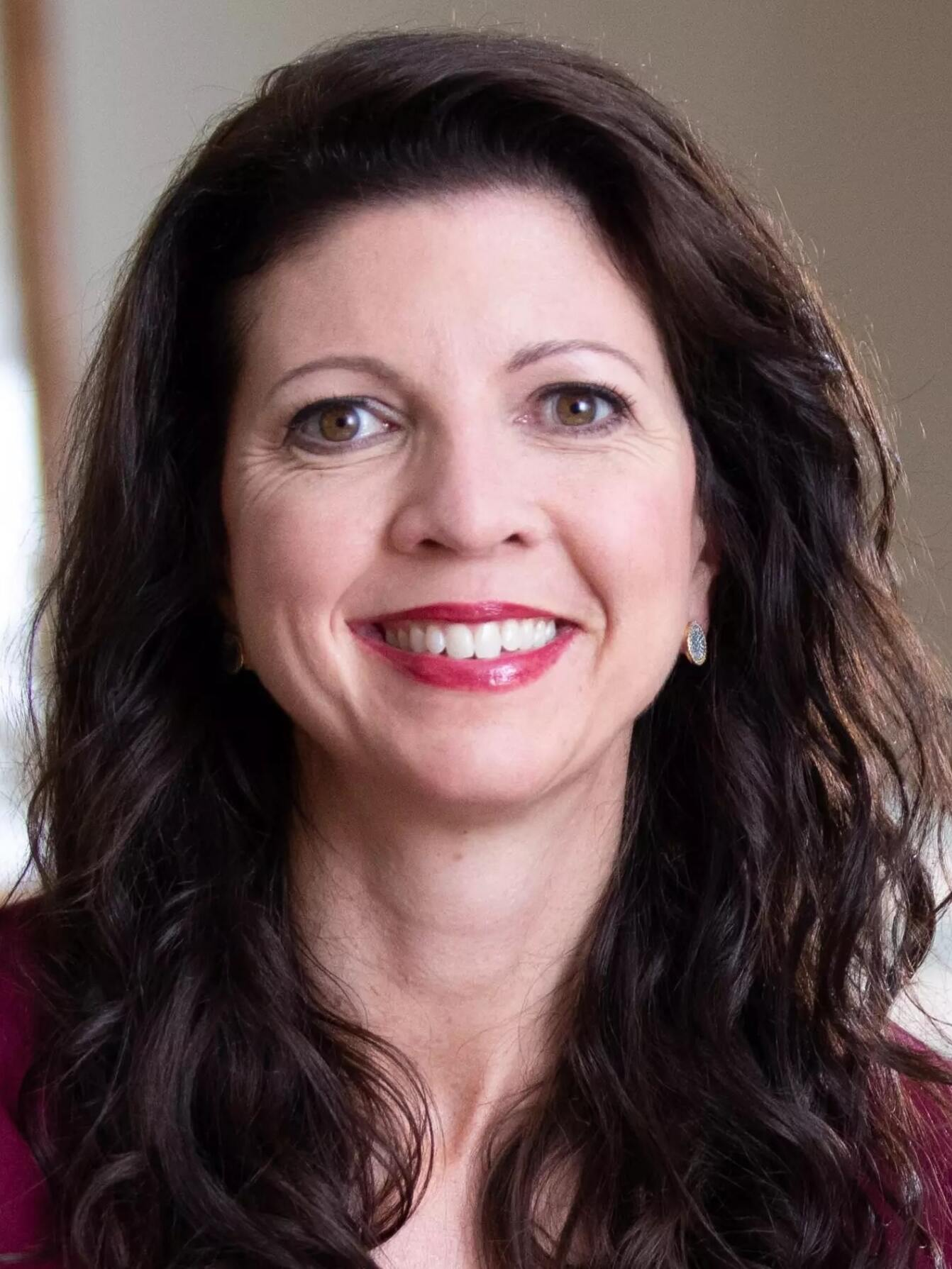
Nominee	Rodney Davis	Betsy Dirksen Londrigan
Party	Republican	Democratic
Popular vote	181,373	151,648
Percentage	54.5%	45.5%
- County results Davis: 50–60% 60–70% 70–80% Londrigan: 50–60% 60–70%
U.S. Representative before election
Rodney Davis
Republican
Elected U.S. Representative
Rodney Davis
Republican

The 13th district encompasses parts of Bond, Champaign, Madison, McLean, and Sangamon counties, and all of Christian, Calhoun, De Witt, Greene, Jersey, Macon, Macoupin, Montgomery, and Piatt counties, including all or parts of the cities of Bloomington, Champaign, Decatur, Godfrey, Springfield, Taylorville, and Urbana. The incumbent was Republican Rodney Davis, who was re-elected with 50.4% of the vote in 2018.

=== Republican primary ===
==== Candidates ====
===== Nominee =====
- Rodney Davis, incumbent U.S. representative

==== Primary results ====
Republican primary results
Party	Candidate	Votes	%
Republican	Rodney Davis (incumbent)	36,668	100.0
Total votes		36,668	100.0

=== Democratic primary ===
==== Candidates ====
===== Nominee =====
- Betsy Dirksen Londrigan, former nonprofit leader, entrepreneur, and nominee for Illinois's 13th congressional district in 2018

===== Eliminated in primary =====
- Stefanie Smith, former sex worker and activist
Stefanie Smith

Organizations

- Democratic Socialists of America - Central Illinois chapter
- Democratic Socialists of America - Champaign-Urbana, Illinois, chapter
- Rose Caucus
- Young Democratic Socialists of America - University of Illinois at Urbana–Champaign chapter

==== Primary results ====
Democratic primary results
Party	Candidate	Votes	%
Democratic	Betsy Dirksen Londrigan	48,766	76.5
Democratic	Stefanie Smith	15,011	23.5
Total votes		63,777	100.0

=== General election ===
==== Debate ====
2020 Illinois's 13th congressional district debate
No.	Date	Host	Moderator	Link	Republican	Democratic
Key: P Participant A Absent N Not invited I Invited W Withdrawn						
Key: P Participant A Absent N Not invited I Invited W Withdrawn					Rodney Davis	Betsey Dirksen Londrigan
1	Oct. 6, 2020	Illinois Public Media; League of Women Voters of Champaign County; WCIA	Brian Mackey		P	P

==== Predictions ====
Source	Ranking	As of
The Cook Political Report	Tossup	October 21, 2020
Inside Elections	Tossup	October 16, 2020
Sabato's Crystal Ball	Lean R	October 20, 2020
Politico	Tossup	October 11, 2020
Daily Kos	Tossup	October 26, 2020
RCP	Tossup	October 28, 2020
Niskanen	Lean D (flip)	July 26, 2020

==== Endorsements ====
Betsy Dirksen Londrigan

U.S. presidents

- Barack Obama, 44th president of the United States

U.S. vice presidents

- Joe Biden, 47th vice president of the United States and 2020 Democratic nominee for President

U.S. senators

- Dick Durbin, U.S. senator from Illinois
- Kamala Harris, U.S. senator from California and 2020 Democratic vice presidential nominee

State legislators

- Andy Manar, state senator

Labor unions

- AFSCME
- Illinois AFL–CIO
- Illinois Nurses Association
- International Brotherhood of Electrical Workers
- International Brotherhood of Teamsters
- United Food and Commercial Workers (UFCW Local 881)
- United Steelworkers

Newspapers

- News-Gazette

Organizations

- Alliance for Retired Americans
- Bend the Arc
- Congressional Black Caucus
- Council for a Livable World
- EMILY's List
- End Citizens United
- Everytown for Gun Safety
- Giffords
- Human Rights Campaign
- J Street
- Moms Demand Action
- NARAL Pro-Choice America
- National Committee to Preserve Social Security and Medicare
- National Organization for Women
- New Democrat Coalition
- Planned Parenthood Action Fund
- Sierra Club

Individuals

- Marie Newman, 2020 Democratic nominee for Illinois's 3rd Congressional District

==== Polling ====
Poll source	Date(s) administered	Sample size	Margin of error	Rodney Davis (R)	Betsy Dirksen Londrigan (D)	Undecided
Tulchin Research (D) (Note: Poll conducted for the DCCC.)	October 1–6, 2020	400 (LV)	± 4.9%	43%	48%	–
GBAO Strategies (D) (Note: Poll sponsored by Londrigan's campaign)	September 17–20, 2020	500 (LV)	± 4.4%	48%	47%	–
RMG Research	July 27 – August 7, 2020	500 (RV)	± 4.5%	41%	43%	16%

==== Results ====
Illinois's 13th congressional district, 2020
Party	Candidate	Votes	%	±%
Republican	Rodney Davis (incumbent)	181,373	54.46	+4.08%
Democratic	Betsy Dirksen Londrigan	151,648	45.54	−4.08%
Total votes		333,021	100.0	
Republican hold				

== District 14 ==
2020 Illinois's 14th congressional district election
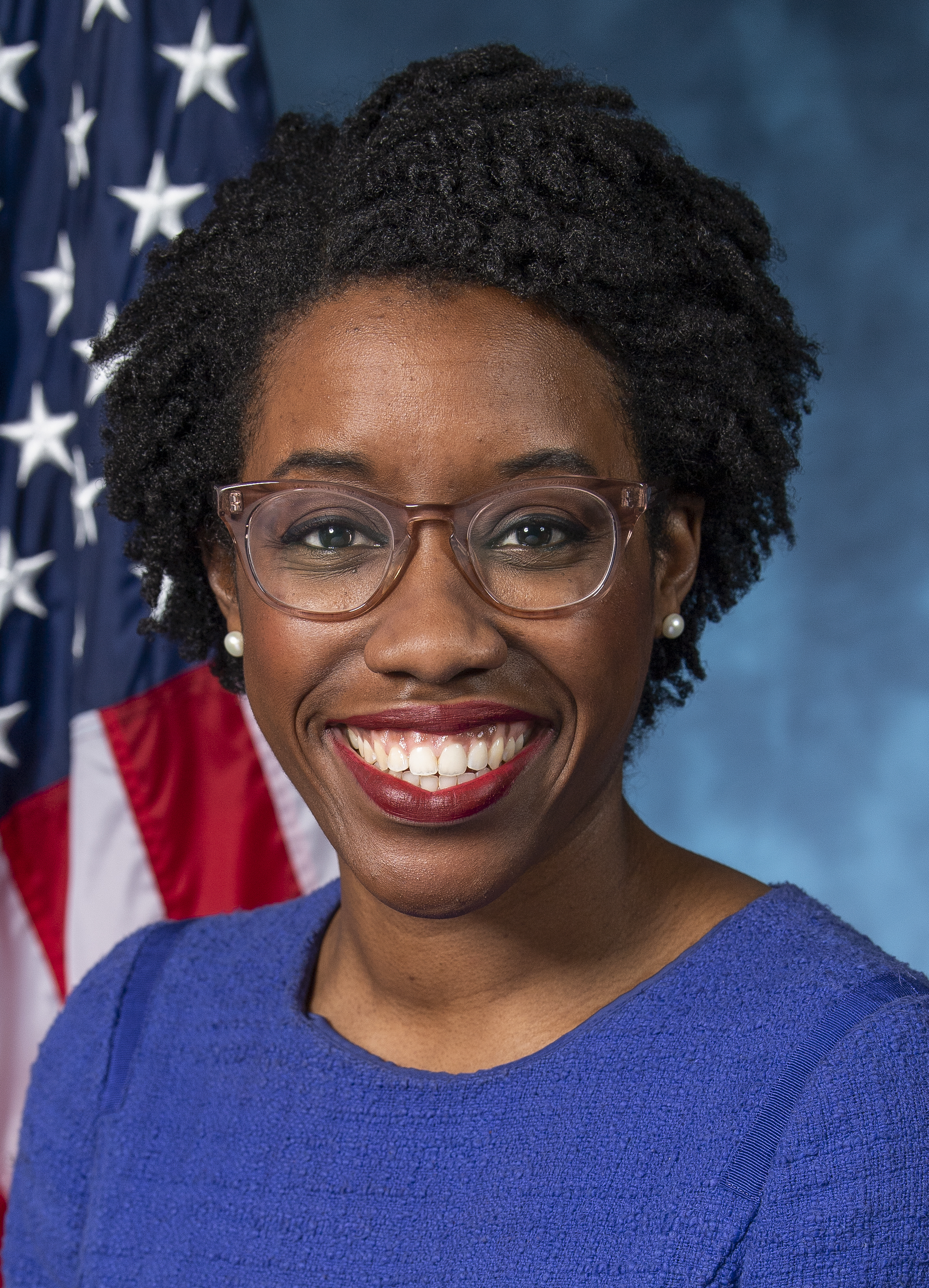

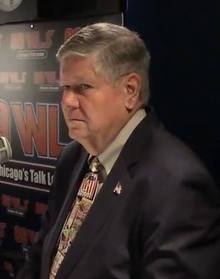
Nominee	Lauren Underwood	Jim Oberweis
Party	Democratic	Republican
Popular vote	203,209	197,835
Percentage	50.7%	49.3%
- County results Underwood: 50–60% 60–70% Oberweis: 50–60%
U.S. Representative before election
Lauren Underwood
Democratic
Elected U.S. Representative
Lauren Underwood
Democratic

The 14th district encompasses the western Chicago exurbs, including all or parts of Batavia, Campton Hills, Crystal Lake, Geneva, Huntley, McHenry, Naperville, St. Charles, North Aurora, Oswego, Plainfield, Plano, Sycamore, Warrenville, Wauconda, Woodstock, and Yorkville. The incumbent was Democrat Lauren Underwood, who flipped the district and was elected with 52.5% of the vote in 2018.

On November 12, the race was called by the Associated Press for Underwood. On January 5, 2021, Jim Oberweis filed notice with the U.S. House of Representatives, challenging the results of the election. On May 12, 2021, the House rejected Oberweis's challenge.

=== Democratic primary ===
==== Candidates ====
===== Nominee =====
- Lauren Underwood, incumbent U.S. representative, former Senior Advisor at the Department of Health and Human Services, and registered nurse

===== Endorsements =====
Lauren Underwood

US presidents

- Barack Obama, 44th president of the United States

Local officials

- Pete Buttigieg, former mayor of South Bend, Indiana (2012–2020) and former candidate for 2020 Democratic presidential nomination

Individuals

- Alex Hirsch, writer, artist, and animator

Publications

- Daily Herald

Organizations

- 314 Action
- Black Economic Alliance
- Democracy for America
- League of Conservation Voters Action Fund
- Sierra Club

==== Primary results ====
Democratic primary results
Party	Candidate	Votes	%
Democratic	Lauren Underwood (incumbent)	77,707	100.0
Total votes		77,707	100.0

=== Republican primary ===
==== Nominee ====
- Jim Oberweis, state senator, nominee for U.S. Senate in 2014, nominee for Illinois's 14th congressional district in 2008, candidate for governor in 2006, and candidate for U.S. Senate in 2002 and 2004

==== Eliminated in primary ====
- Anthony Catella, U.S. Army veteran
- Jerry Evans
- Ted Gradel, businessman and youth basketball coach
- Catalina Lauf, former special adviser to U.S. Department of Commerce
- Jim Marter, businessman, former chairman of the Kendall County Republican Party, and candidate for U.S. Senate in 2016
- Sue Rezin, state senator

==== Withdrawn ====
- Danny Malouf, human resource director
- Matt Quigley, U.S. Navy veteran

==== Declined ====
- Allen Skillicorn, state representative

==== Endorsements ====
Catalina Lauf

Organizations

- The New York Young Republican Club
Jim Oberweis

U.S. Executive Branch officials

- Donald Trump, 45th president of the United States

U.S. senators

- Marco Rubio, U.S. senator from Florida

U.S. representatives

- Don Manzullo, former Representative IL-16 (1993–2013)
Sue Rezin

State-wide officials

- Leslie Munger, former Comptroller of Illinois

Newspapers

- Chicago Tribune
- Daily Herald

==== Polling ====
Poll source	Date(s) administered	Sample size	Margin of error	Ted Gradel	Catalina Lauf	Jim Marter	Jim Oberweis	Sue Rezin	Undecided
McLaughlin and Associates (Note: Poll sponsored by Oberweis' campaign)	January 28–29, 2020	300 (LV)	± 5.6%	2%	6%	2%	46%	16%	29%
McLaughlin and Associates	July 30 – August 4, 2019	200 (LV)	± 6.9%	4%	–	–	56%	8%	33%

==== Primary results ====
Results by county: Oberweis—30–40% Oberweis—20–30% Rezin—20–30% Lauf—20–30%

Republican primary results
Party	Candidate	Votes	%
Republican	Jim Oberweis	13,333	25.6
Republican	Sue Rezin	11,879	22.8
Republican	Catalina Lauf	10,451	20.1
Republican	Ted Gradel	6,979	13.4
Republican	Jim Marter	5,724	11.0
Republican	Jerry Evans	2,609	5.0
Republican	Anthony Catella	1,118	2.1
Total votes		52,093	100.0

=== General election ===
==== Predictions ====
Source	Ranking	As of
The Cook Political Report	Likely D	October 21, 2020
Inside Elections	Safe D	October 16, 2020
Sabato's Crystal Ball	Likely D	October 20, 2020
Politico	Lean D	October 11, 2020
Daily Kos	Likely D	October 29, 2020
RCP	Lean D	October 28, 2020
Niskanen	Lean D	June 7, 2020

==== Polling ====
Poll source	Date(s) administered	Sample size	Margin of error	Lauren Underwood (D)	Jim Oberweis (R)	Undecided
McLaughlin and Associates (R)	July 30 – August 4, 2019	300 (LV)	± 6.9%	47% (Note: Standard VI response)	38%	15%

==== Results ====
Illinois's 14th congressional district, 2020
Party	Candidate	Votes	%	±%
Democratic	Lauren Underwood (incumbent)	203,209	50.67	−1.83%
Republican	Jim Oberweis	197,835	49.33	+1.83%
Write-in		8	0.00	N/A
Total votes		401,052	100.0	
Democratic hold				

== District 15 ==
2020 Illinois's 15th congressional district election
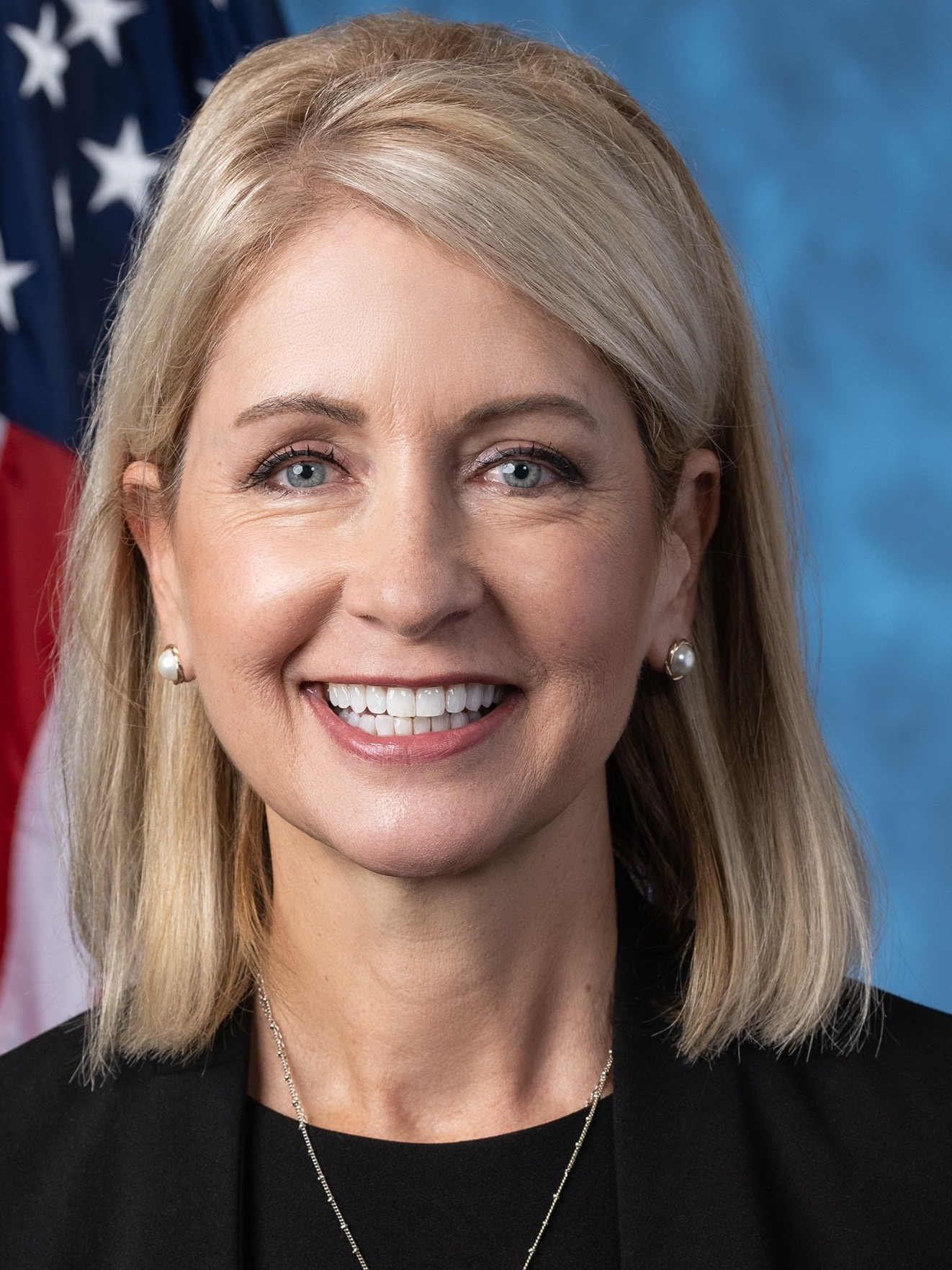

Nominee	Mary Miller	Erika Weaver
Party	Republican	Democratic
Popular vote	244,947	88,559
Percentage	73.5%	26.5%
- County results Miller: 60–70% 70–80% 80–90%
U.S. Representative before election
John Shimkus
Republican
Elected U.S. Representative
Mary Miller
Republican

The 15th district encompasses rural east-central and southeastern Illinois. The incumbent was Republican John Shimkus, who was re-elected with 70.9% of the vote in 2018. Shimkus announced he would not be seeking re-election on August 30, 2019. After briefly considering reversing his retirement plans, Shimkus reaffirmed his decision to not run on November 4, 2019.

=== Republican primary ===
==== Candidates ====
===== Nominee =====
- Mary Miller, Oakland farm owner and wife of state representative Chris Miller

===== Eliminated in primary =====
- Darren Duncan, Vermilion County treasurer
- Charles Ellington, family physician
- Kerry Wolff, vice president of the Altamont school board

===== Withdrawn =====
- Alex Walker, U.S. Air Force veteran

===== Declined =====
- Erika Harold, nominee for Illinois Attorney General in 2018 and former Miss America
- Mike Marron, state representative
- Kyle McCarter, U.S. Ambassador to Kenya and former state senator
- Dale Righter, state senator
- Chapin Rose, state senator
- John Shimkus, incumbent U.S. representative

==== Primary results ====
Republican primary results
Party	Candidate	Votes	%
Republican	Mary Miller	48,129	57.4
Republican	Darren Duncan	18,309	21.8
Republican	Kerry Wolff	11,208	13.4
Republican	Charles Ellington	6,200	7.4
Total votes		83,846	100.0

=== Democratic primary ===
==== Candidates ====
===== Nominee =====
- Erika Weaver, member of the Mattoon school board

===== Eliminated in primary =====
- Kevin Gaither, nominee for Illinois's 15th congressional district in 2018
- John W. Hursey Jr., community activist
- Craig Morton, Salem city councilman

==== Primary results ====
Democratic primary results
Party	Candidate	Votes	%
Democratic	Erika Weaver	17,778	51.9
Democratic	Kevin Gaither	7,653	22.3
Democratic	Craig Morton	6,576	19.2
Democratic	John W. Hursey, Jr.	2,244	6.5
Total votes		34,251	100.0

=== General election ===
==== Endorsements ====
Mary Miller (R)

Federal officials

- Donald Trump, 45th president of the United States

Organizations

- Susan B. Anthony List

==== Predictions ====
Source	Ranking	As of
The Cook Political Report	Safe R	October 21, 2020
Inside Elections	Safe R	October 16, 2020
Sabato's Crystal Ball	Safe R	October 20, 2020
Politico	Safe R	October 11, 2020
Daily Kos	Safe R	October 26, 2020
RCP	Safe R	October 28, 2020
Niskanen	Safe R	June 7, 2020

==== Results ====
Illinois's 15th congressional district, 2020
Party	Candidate	Votes	%	±%
Republican	Mary Miller	244,947	73.45	+2.52%
Democratic	Erika Weaver	88,559	26.55	−2.52%
Total votes		333,506	100.0	
Republican hold				

== District 16 ==
2020 Illinois's 16th congressional district election
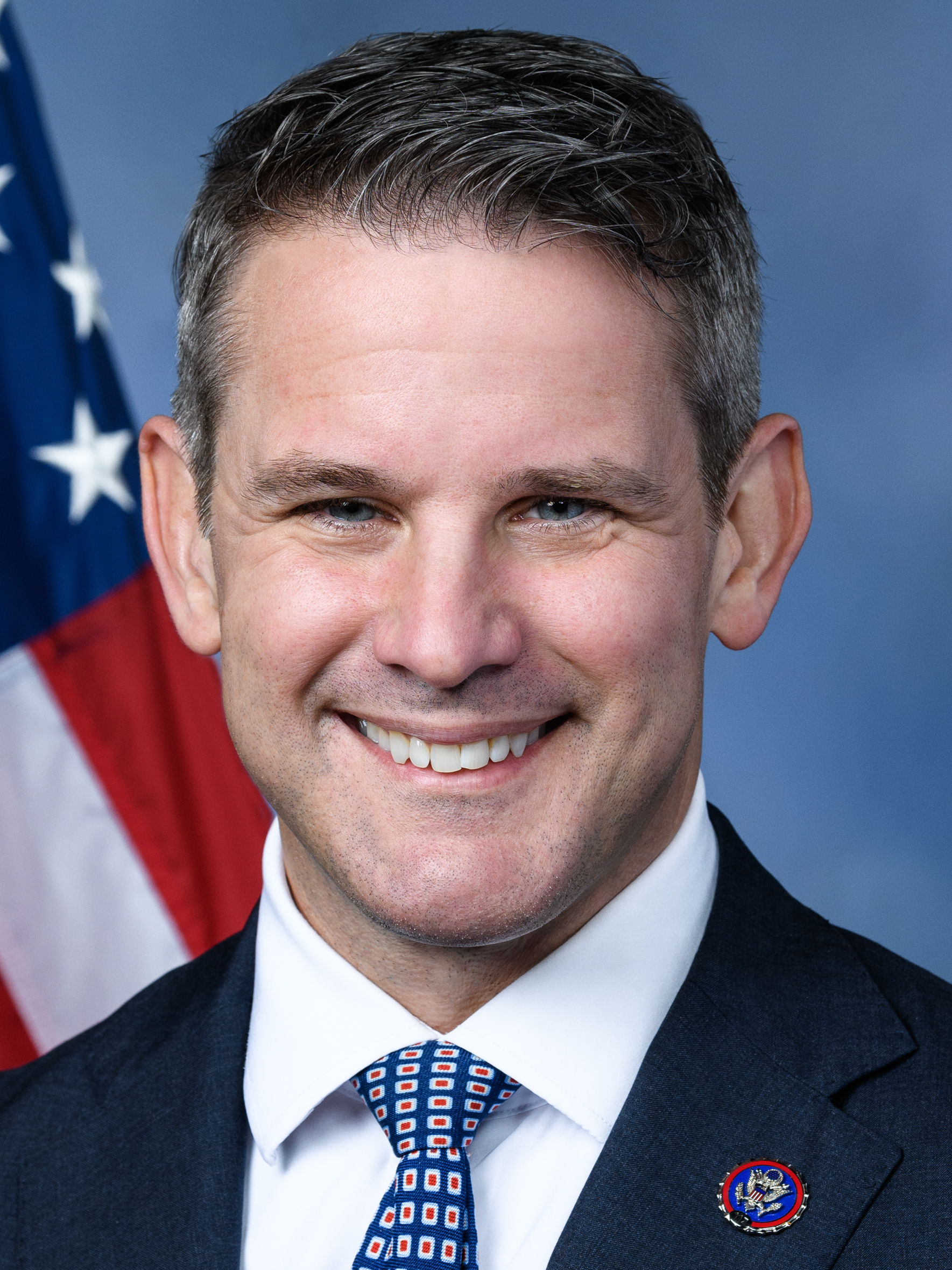

Nominee	Adam Kinzinger	Dani Brzozowski
Party	Republican	Democratic
Popular vote	218,839	119,313
Percentage	64.7%	35.3%
- County results Kinzinger: 60–70% 70–80% 80–90% Brzozowski: 50–60%
U.S. Representative before election
Adam Kinzinger
Republican
Elected U.S. Representative
Adam Kinzinger
Republican

The 16th district encompasses north-central Illinois, taking in the east side of Rockford, Belvidere, Ottawa, and DeKalb. The incumbent was Republican Adam Kinzinger, who was re-elected with 59.1% of the vote in 2018.

=== Republican primary ===
==== Candidates ====
===== Nominee =====
- Adam Kinzinger, incumbent U.S. representative

==== Primary results ====
Republican primary results
Party	Candidate	Votes	%
Republican	Adam Kinzinger (incumbent)	45,296	100.0
Total votes		45,296	100.0

=== Democratic primary ===
==== Candidates ====
===== Nominee =====
- Dani Brzozowski, activist and chairwoman of LaSalle County Democrats

==== Primary results ====
Democratic primary results
Party	Candidate	Votes	%
Democratic	Dani Brzozowski	50,811	100.0
Total votes		50,811	100.0

=== Endorsements ===
Dani Brzozowski (D)

U.S. senators

- Tammy Duckworth, IL
- Dick Durbin, IL

U.S. representatives

- Sean Casten, representative for Illinois's 6th congressional district
- Bill Foster, representative for Illinois's 11th congressional district
- Jesús "Chuy" García, representative for Illinois's 4th congressional district
- Robin Kelly, representative for Illinois's 2nd congressional district
- Jan Schakowsky, representative for Illinois's 9th congressional district
- Lauren Underwood, representative for Illinois's 14th congressional district

Statewide elected officials

- Mike Frerichs, Illinois state treasurer

State senators

- Daniel Biss, former Illinois state senator, Democratic gubernatorial candidate in 2018
- Melinda Bush, state senator

State representatives

- Kelly Cassidy, state representative

Congressional candidates

- Marie Newman, Democratic nominee for Illinois's 3rd congressional district

Unions

- AFL–CIO
- Illinois Federation of Teachers
- Illinois Nurses Association
- Teamsters Joint Council 25

Organizations

- Congressional Black Caucus PAC
- End Citizens United
- Independent Voters of Illinois Independent Precinct Organization
- Indivisible
- NARAL Pro-Choice America
- National Organization for Women
- Our Revolution Will County Progressives
- Planned Parenthood
- Sierra Club
- Sunrise Movement DeKalb

Individuals

- Gloria Steinem, feminist, journalist, activist
Adam Kinzinger (R)

Organization

- Citizens for Responsible Energy Solutions

=== General election ===
==== Predictions ====
Source	Ranking	As of
The Cook Political Report	Safe R	October 21, 2020
Inside Elections	Safe R	October 16, 2020
Sabato's Crystal Ball	Safe R	October 20, 2020
Politico	Likely R	October 11, 2020
Daily Kos	Safe R	October 26, 2020
RCP	Safe R	October 28, 2020
Niskanen	Safe R	June 7, 2020

==== Results ====
Illinois's 16th congressional district, 2020
Party	Candidate	Votes	%	±%
Republican	Adam Kinzinger (incumbent)	218,839	64.71	+5.59%
Democratic	Dani Brzozowski	119,313	35.28	−5.60%
Write-in		7	0.00	N/A
Total votes		338,159	100.0	
Republican hold				

== District 17 ==
2020 Illinois's 17th congressional district election
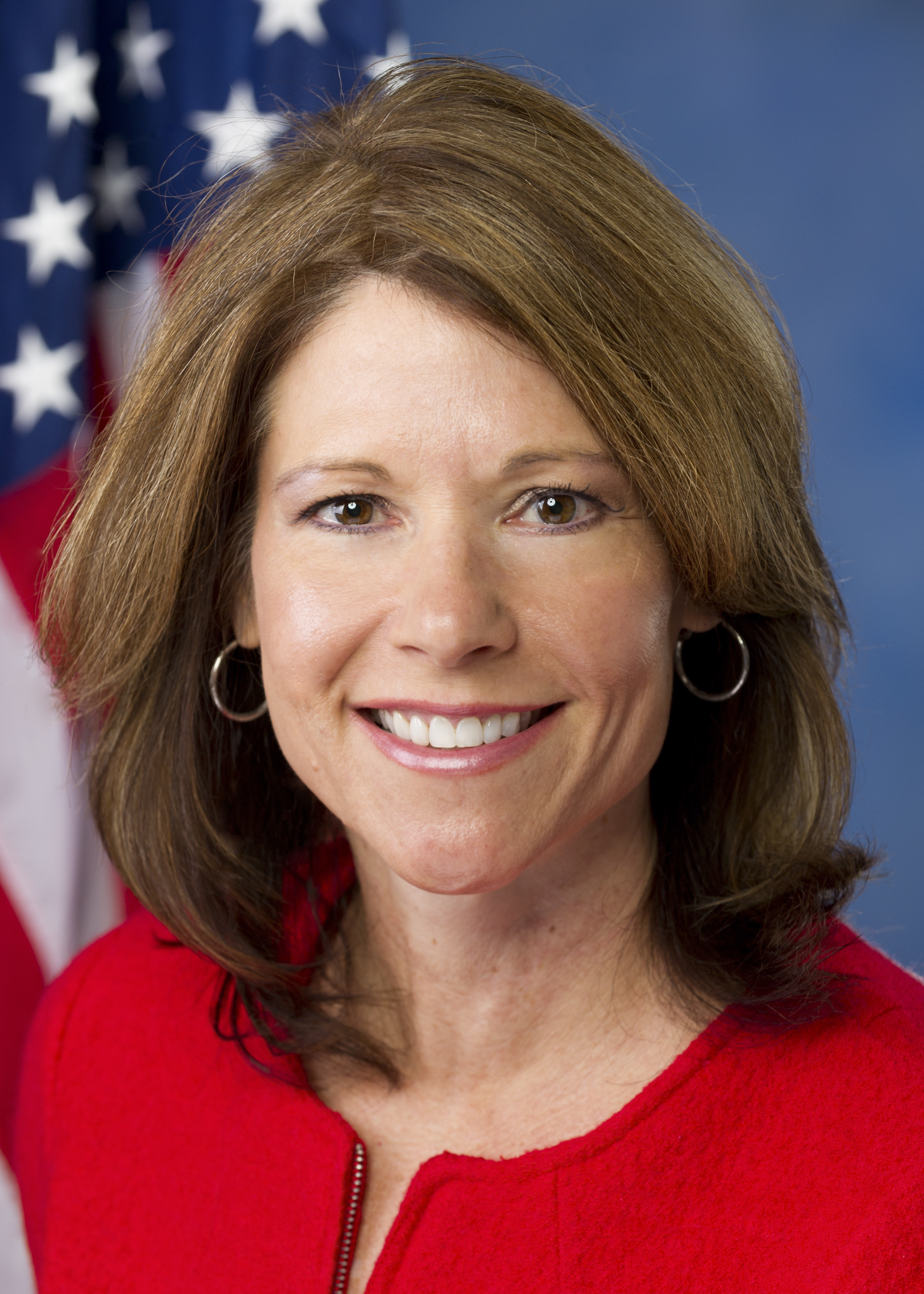

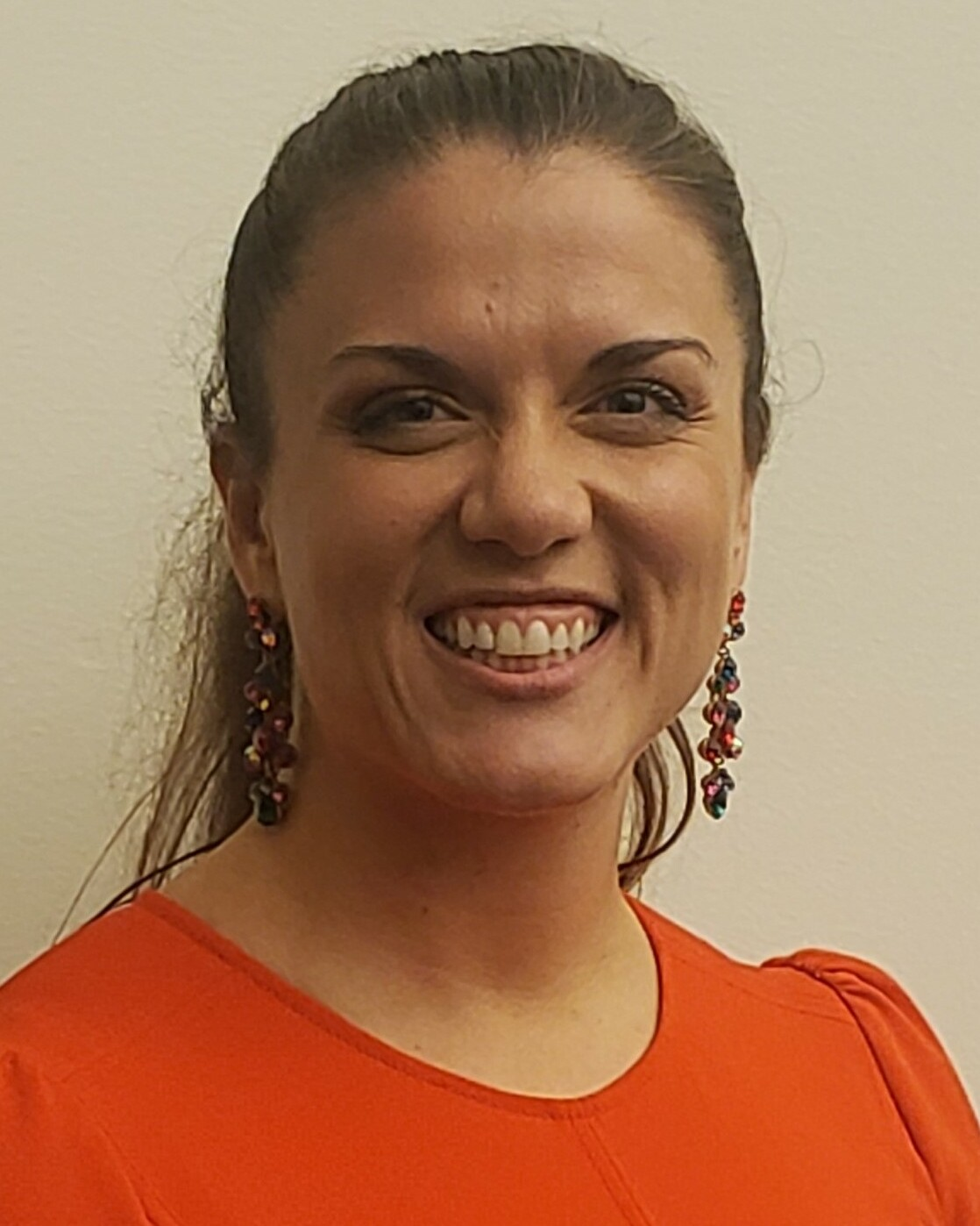
Nominee	Cheri Bustos	Esther Joy King
Party	Democratic	Republican
Popular vote	156,011	143,863
Percentage	52.0%	48.0%
- County results Bustos: 50–60% 60–70% King: 50–60% 60–70%
U.S. Representative before election
Cheri Bustos
Democratic
Elected U.S. Representative
Cheri Bustos
Democratic

The 17th district encompasses northwestern Illinois, including the Quad cities metro, the westside of Rockford, and Peoria. Democratic incumbent Cheri Bustos was re-elected with 52.0% of the vote while the district voted for Donald Trump in the concurrently-held presidential election by 1.6%, making it one of only seven Trump-won districts held by a Democrat in the 117th Congress.

=== Democratic primary ===
==== Candidates ====
===== Nominee =====
- Cheri Bustos, incumbent U.S. Representative

===== Eliminated in primary =====
- Spanky Edwards, chairman of the Youth Works Committee of the Illinois branch of the NAACP

==== Primary results ====
Democratic primary results
Party	Candidate	Votes	%
Democratic	Cheri Bustos (incumbent)	56,388	99.7
Democratic	Spanky Edwards (write-in)	189	0.3
Total votes		56,577	100.0

=== Republican primary ===
==== Candidates ====
===== Nominee =====
- Esther Joy King, attorney and businesswoman

===== Eliminated in primary =====
- Bill Fawell, real estate broker and nominee for Illinois's 17th congressional district in 2018

==== Primary results ====
Republican primary results
Party	Candidate	Votes	%
Republican	Esther Joy King	19,464	65.1
Republican	Bill Fawell	10,423	34.9
Total votes		29,887	100.0

=== Endorsements ===
Cheri Bustos (D)

Organizations

- End Citizens United
- J Street PAC
- Planned Parenthood Action Fund
Esther Joy King (R)

U.S. Executive Branch officials

- Donald Trump, President of the United States

Organizations

- Susan B. Anthony List

=== General election ===
==== Predictions ====
Source	Ranking	As of
The Cook Political Report	Lean D	October 21, 2020
Inside Elections	Safe D	October 16, 2020
Sabato's Crystal Ball	Likely D	October 20, 2020
Politico	Lean D	November 2, 2020
Daily Kos	Likely D	October 26, 2020
RCP	Likely D	October 28, 2020
Niskanen	Safe D	June 7, 2020

==== Polling ====
Poll source	Date(s) administered	Sample size	Margin of error	Cheri Bustos (D)	Esther Joy King (R)	Undecided
Tarrance Group (R) (Note: Poll sponsored by the NRCC, which endorsed King prior to the sampling period.)	October 10–12, 2020	418 (LV)	± 4.9%	49%	44%	7%
Public Opinion Strategies (R) (Note: Poll sponsored by the Congressional Leadership Fund, which endorsed King prior to the sampling period.)	October 4–6, 2020	400 (LV)	± 4.9%	48%	42%	8%

==== Results ====
Illinois's 17th congressional district, 2020
Party	Candidate	Votes	%	±%
Democratic	Cheri Bustos (incumbent)	156,011	52.02	−10.07%
Republican	Esther Joy King	143,863	47.97	+10.06%
Write-in		21	0.01	N/A
Total votes		299,895	100.0	
Democratic hold				

== District 18 ==
2020 Illinois's 18th congressional district election
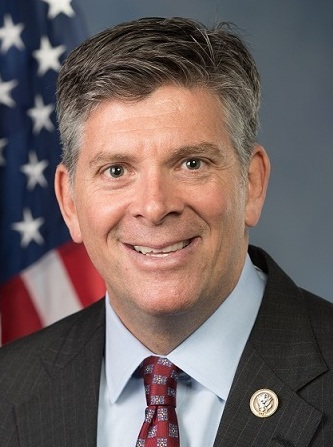

Nominee	Darin LaHood	George Petrilli
Party	Republican	Democratic
Popular vote	261,840	110,039
Percentage	70.4%	29.6%
- County results LaHood: 60–70% 70–80% 80–90%
U.S. Representative before election
Darin LaHood
Republican
Elected U.S. Representative
Darin LaHood
Republican

The 18th district covers rural west-central Illinois, including Jacksonville, Quincy, and parts of Bloomington, Peoria, and Springfield. The incumbent was Republican Darin LaHood, who was re-elected with 67.2% of the vote in 2018.

=== Republican primary ===
==== Candidates ====
===== Nominee =====
- Darin LaHood, incumbent U.S. representative

==== Primary results ====
Republican primary results
Party	Candidate	Votes	%
Republican	Darin LaHood (incumbent)	59,542	100.0
Total votes		59,542	100.0

=== Democratic primary ===
After the primaries ended, Democratic Party leaders in the district placed George Petrilli, an attorney, on the ballot.

==== Withdrawn ====
- Mark Haasis, former national organizer for United Automobile Workers

=== General election ===
==== Predictions ====
Source	Ranking	As of
The Cook Political Report	Safe R	October 21, 2020
Inside Elections	Safe R	October 16, 2020
Sabato's Crystal Ball	Safe R	October 20, 2020
Politico	Safe R	October 11, 2020
Daily Kos	Safe R	October 26, 2020
RCP	Safe R	October 28, 2020
Niskanen	Safe R	June 7, 2020

==== Results ====
Illinois's 18th congressional district, 2020
Party	Candidate	Votes	%	±%
Republican	Darin LaHood (incumbent)	261,840	70.41	+3.18%
Democratic	George Petrilli	110,039	29.59	−3.18%
Total votes		371,879	100.0	
Republican hold				

== Notes ==
Partisan clients
