= Rachel Ventura =

Illinois State Senator

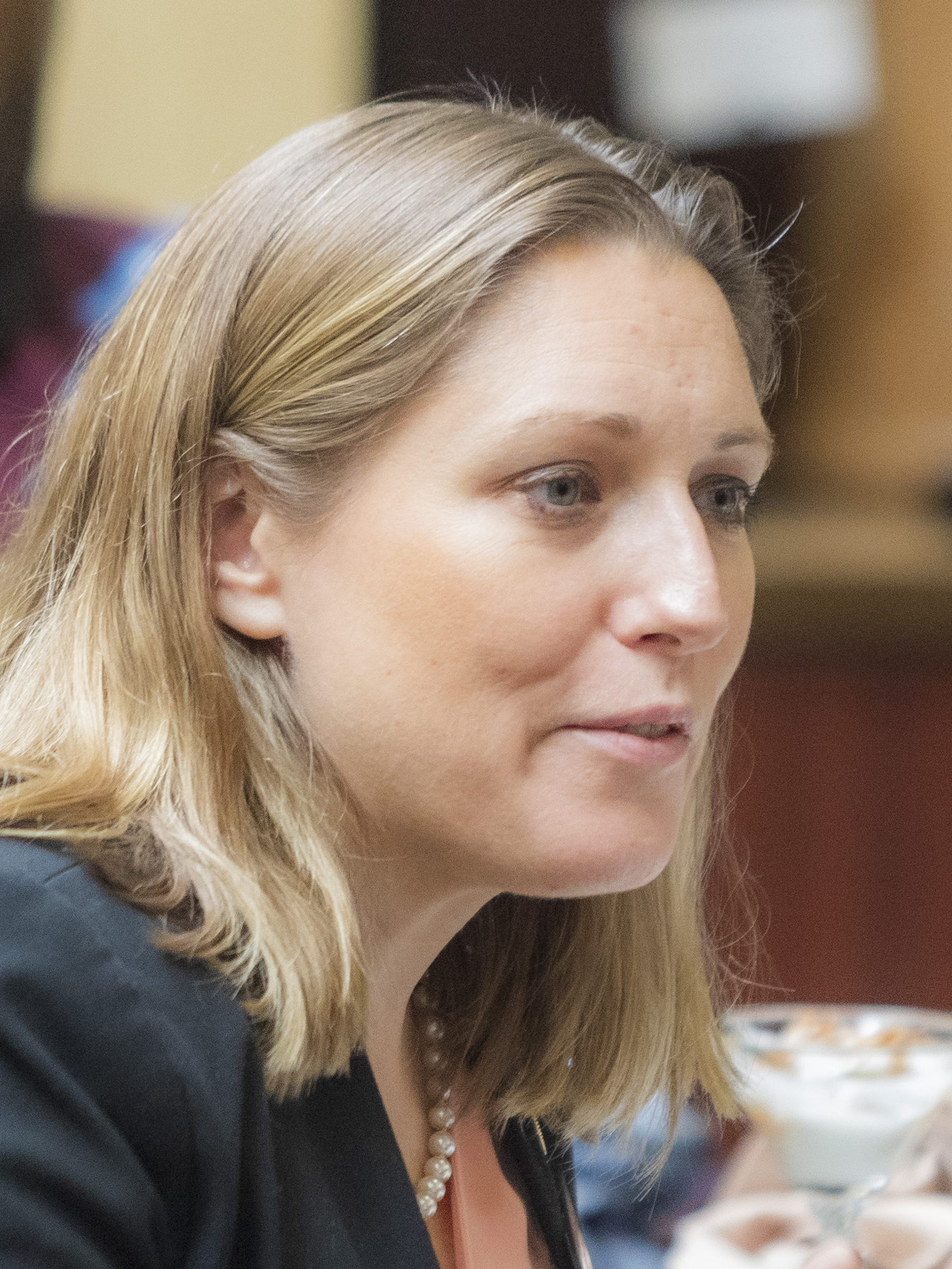
- Ventura in 2025

Member of the Illinois Senate from the 43rd district
- Incumbent
- Assumed office January 11, 2023
- Preceded by: Eric Mattson

Personal details
- Born: Rachel McReynolds; April 4, 1981 (age 45) Joliet, Illinois, U.S.
- Party: Democratic
- Children: 2
- Education: Benedictine University (BS); Tidewater Community College (AS)

Rachel F. Ventura (née McReynolds) is an American politician from the state of Illinois currently serving as a member of the Illinois Senate from the 43rd district. A member of the Democratic Party, Ventura previously served as a member of the Will County Board from 2018 to 2022. She also ran against Bill Foster in the 2020 U.S. House of Representatives Primary Election for Illinois's 11th Congressional District, though she ultimately lost to Foster.

== Early life and education ==
Rachel Ventura was born in Joliet, Illinois. She received a BS in Mathematics from Benedictine University and later received an AS in Biology from Tidewater Community College.

== Electoral history ==
Will County Board's 9th District Democratic Primary, 2018
Party	Candidate	Votes	%
Democratic	Rachel Ventura	1,841	26.18
Democratic	Jim Murphy	1,663	23.65
Democratic	Sherry Williams	1,593	22.26
Democratic	Todd Randich	1,394	19.83
Democratic	Danganetta Harris	540	7.68
Total votes		7,031	100.0

Will County Board's 9th District General Election, 2018
Party	Candidate	Votes	%
Democratic	Rachel Ventura	8,706	39.70
Republican	Annette Parker (incumbent)	6,997	31.91
Democratic	Jim Murphy	6,224	28.39
Total votes		21,927	100.0

Illinois 11th Congressional District Democratic Primary, 2020
Party	Candidate	Votes	%
Democratic	Bill Foster (incumbent)	46,116	58.72
Democratic	Rachel Ventura	32,422	41.28
Total votes		78,538	100.0

Illinois 43rd Senate District Democratic Primary, 2022
Party	Candidate	Votes	%
Democratic	Rachel Ventura	7,593	57.65
Democratic	Eric Mattson (incumbent)	5,578	42.35
Total votes		13,171	100.0

Illinois 43rd Senate District General Election, 2022
Party	Candidate	Votes	%
Democratic	Rachel Ventura	33,667	56.05
Republican	Diane Harris	26,396	43.95
Total votes		60,063	100.0

== Other work ==
Rachel Ventura worked in the tabletop games industry from 2011-2021 and has written a Dungeons & Dragons adventure called A Feast of Flavor which was nominated for an ENNIE award in 2018.
