= John Connor (Illinois politician) =

American politician

Member of the Illinois Senate from the 43rd district
- In office January 13, 2021 – April 29, 2022
- Preceded by: Pat McGuire
- Succeeded by: Eric Mattson

Member of the Illinois House of Representatives from the 85th district
- In office June 24, 2017 – January 13, 2021
- Preceded by: Emily McAsey
- Succeeded by: Dagmara Avelar

Personal details
- Born: Joliet, Illinois
- Party: Democratic
- Education: University of Notre Dame (B.A.); University of Illinois (J.D.)
- Profession: Attorney

John Connor is an American judge and former politician serving as a Circuit Judge on the 12th Judicial Circuit of Illinois since 2022 who served as a Democratic member of the Illinois Senate and Illinois House of Representatives.

== Political career ==
In 2017, Connor was appointed to the Illinois House of Representatives. Connor assumed the position following the resignation of Emily McAsey in June 2017. He served the remainder of McAsey's term until early 2019. As a prosecutor, Connor has been involved in high-profile cases, such as the Drew Peterson case. Connor's term came towards the end of the Illinois state budget crisis, when the House ruled 71–42 to override Governor Bruce Rauner's veto of a state budget package. Connor was one of six Democrats to vote no.

In the 2020 general election, Connor successfully ran for the Illinois Senate seat being vacated by fellow Democrat Pat McGuire. Connor was succeeded in the Illinois House by Democrat Dagmara Avelar.

He resigned from the Senate on April 29, 2022, and Eric Mattson was appointed to replace him on May 6, 2022.

In November 2022, Connor was elected as a Circuit Judge for the 12th Judicial Circuit of Illinois, defeating Arkadiusz "Art" Smigielski for the vacancy of Richard Schoenstedt with 51.64% of the vote.
