= Arthur Wilhelmi =

American politician (born 1968)

Arthur "AJ" Wilhelmi

Member of the Illinois Senate from the 43rd district
- In office January 2005 – February 2012
- Preceded by: Larry Walsh
- Succeeded by: Pat McGuire

Personal details
- Born: May 14, 1968 (age 58) Joliet, Illinois
- Party: Democratic
- Spouse: Michelle Wilhelmi
- Children: Three Children
- Education: Chicago–Kent College of Law; Loyola University
- Profession: Attorney

Arthur "AJ" Wilhelmi (born 1968) is a former Democratic member of the Illinois Senate and current President & CEO of the Illinois Health and Hospital Association. Wilhelmi represented the 43rd District since being appointed in 2005, until his resignation in February 2012.

Wilhelmi graduated from Loyola University of Chicago (B.A. cum laude) and Chicago-Kent College of Law (J.D.). He and his wife live in Joliet with their two children.

A.J. Wilhelmi was born and raised in Joliet, Illinois, by his parents, Mary Beth and Art Wilhelmi. Wilhelmi's father was a dentist in Joliet and his mother a homemaker. Wilhelmi has three sisters and two brothers, one of whom is Steve Wilhelmi, current County Board member from District 9.

Wilhelmi attended Joliet Catholic High School and has a BA degree from Loyola University of Chicago, with a major in English and minors in Philosophy and Political Science. In 1991 he graduated from Chicago-Kent College of Law. After passing the Illinois State Bar Examination, Wilhelmi was sworn in as an attorney in 1993, and joined the McKeown Law Firm. He developed a real estate and business law practice. In 2008, he joined Murer Consultants, Inc., a legal-based healthcare consulting firm. In 2009, the partners opened a law firm, Murer, Brick & Wilhelmi, LLC.

== Political activity ==
Wilhelmi was active in the local Democratic Party when in college and law school. Between 1998 and 2004, he actively supported his brother Steve in his campaigns. Wilhelmi was Senator Dick Durbin's campaign coordinator for Will County in 2002. In 2008, Wilhelmi supported Obama's campaign for President of the United States. He served in the Illinois Senate from 2005 to 2012. He was Chairman of the Senate Judiciary Committee, Vice-Chairman of the Agriculture & Conservation Committee, and served on the Transportation, Gaming and Criminal Law Committees. In 2018, Democrat J. B. Pritzker appointed Wilhelmi a member of the gubernatorial transition's Healthy Children and Families Committee.
