= Dagmara Avelar =

American politician

Dee Avelar

Member of the Illinois House of Representatives from the 85th district
- Incumbent
- Assumed office January 13, 2021
- Preceded by: John Connor

Personal details
- Born: Quito, Ecuador
- Party: Democratic
- Education: University of Illinois (MUP); Northeastern Illinois University (BA)
- Occupation: Politician
- Website: General Assembly Page

Dagmara "Dee" Avelar is a Democratic member of the Illinois House of Representatives for the 85th district. She has held the position since January 13, 2021. The 85th district, located in the Chicago area, covers all or parts of Bolingbrook, Crest Hill, Fairmont, Lemont, Lockport, Naperville, Romeoville, and Woodridge. As of 2025, she serves as an Assistant Majority Leader.

Avelar was elected to succeed outgoing State Representative John Connor, who had been elected to the Illinois Senate.

== Early life, education, and career ==
Avelar was born in Quito, Ecuador and moved to Bolingbrook, Illinois with her parents when she was 12. She graduated from Bolingbrook High School in 2005. She earned a Bachelor of Arts in Justice Studies with a minor in Political Science from Northeastern Illinois University in 2010 and earned her Master's Degree in Urban Planning and Policy Candidate at the University of Illinois at Chicago. She has been an active community organizer since 2008. She previously worked at Instituto Del Progreso Latino "as an accredited representative with a focus on citizenship and DACA." As of 2020, she works at the Illinois Coalition for Immigrant and Refugee Rights as Director of Programs.

== Illinois House of Representatives ==
=== Committees ===
Avelar currently serves on eight House committees and four House subcommittees: the Appropriations-Pensions & Personnel committee; the Economic Opportunity & Equity committee; the Health Care Availability & Access committee; the Labor & Commerce committee; the Personnel & Pensions committee; the Prescription Drug Affordability & Accessibility committee; the Revenue & Finance Committee; Transportation: Regulation, Roads, & Bridges committee; as well as the Job & Workforce Development subcommittee; the Pharmacy Benefit Manager subcommittee; Sales Tax subcommittee; and the Tax Policy: Finance subcommittee.

=== Legislation ===
Several bills filed by Rep. Avelar have gone on to become law. These include an amendment to the Environmental Protection Act that requires groundwater monitoring at some construction sites, legislation that requires hospitals to proactively offer charity care options to uninsured patients, and a statute that requires insurance companies that issue group accident and health policies to offer these policies to local chambers of commerce.

== Electoral history ==
Illinois 85th State House District Democratic Primary, 2020
Party	Candidate	Votes	%
Democratic	Dagmara "Dee" Avelar	10,658	100.0
Total votes		10,658	100.0

Illinois 85th State House District General Election, 2020
Party	Candidate	Votes	%
Democratic	Dagmara "Dee" Avelar	26,560	59.00
Republican	Ron Doweidt	16,129	35.83
Green	Anna Schiefelbein	2,326	5.17
Total votes		45,015	100.0

Illinois 85th State House District General Election, 2022
Party	Candidate	Votes	%
Democratic	Dagmara "Dee" Avelar	17,644	57.62
Republican	Chris Metcalfe	12,975	42.38
Total votes		30,619	100.0

Illinois 85th State House District General Election, 2024
Party	Candidate	Votes	%
Democratic	Dagmara "Dee" Avelar	25,360	58.30
Republican	Chris Metcalfe	18,142	41.70
Total votes		43,502	100.0

== Personal life ==
Avelar resides in Bolingbrook, Illinois. She became a naturalized US citizen in April 2016.
