= Eric Mattson =

American politician

Member of the Illinois Senate from the 43rd district
- In office May 6, 2022 – January 11, 2023
- Preceded by: John Connor
- Succeeded by: Rachel Ventura

Personal details
- Party: Democratic

Eric Mattson is an American firefighter and politician who served as a Democratic member of the Illinois State Senate for the 43rd District from 2022 to 2023.

== Career ==
Mattson serves as a captain in the Joliet Fire Department and is President of the Joliet Fire Officers Local 2399 union.

Mattson announced his candidacy for the 43rd District in February 2022 after incumbent John Connor announced he would not seek re-election in 2022. In May 2022, Mattson was appointed to the Illinois State Senate by local Democratic Party leaders to fill the vacancy caused by Connor's early resignation. Local news reported that Burke Schuster, Chairman of the Will County Democratic Central Committee who played a key role for the appointment, is also an officer in the Joliet Fire Department and is Vice President of the Joliet Fire Officers Local 2399.

Mattson pledged to focus on mental health resources, while primary opponent Rachel Ventura focused on environmental issues. Ventura won the Democratic nomination on June 28, 2022.

During his tenure, Mattson was a member of the following Illinois Senate committees:

- Financial Institutions Committee (SFIC)
- Healthcare Access and Availability Committee (SHAA)
- Pensions Committee (SPEN)

== Electoral history ==
2022 Illinois's 43rd Senate district Democratic Primary
Party	Candidate	Votes	%
Democratic	Rachel Ventura	7,179	57.4%
Democratic	Eric Mattson (incumbent)	5,325	42.6%
Total votes		12,504	100%
