= Pat McGuire (politician) =

American politician

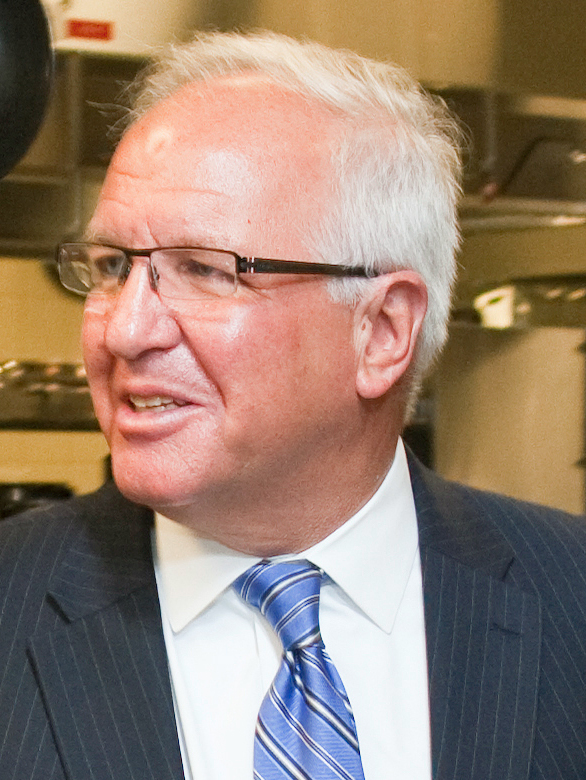

Member of the Illinois Senate from the 43rd district
- In office February 25, 2012 – January 13, 2021
- Preceded by: Arthur Wilhelmi
- Succeeded by: John Connor

Will County Treasurer
- In office December 2006 – December 2010
- Preceded by: Karen Callanan
- Succeeded by: Steve Weber

Personal details
- Party: Democratic
- Education: University of St. Francis
- Profession: Teacher

Pat McGuire was the Illinois State Senator for the 43rd district from his appointment in 2012 to January 13, 2021. The 43rd district includes all or part of Bolingbrook, Crest Hill, Elwood, Fairmont, Joliet, Lockport, Manhattan, Preston Heights, Rockdale and Romeoville.

Prior to his service in the Illinois General Assembly, he served as the Will County Treasurer and the Braidwood City Clerk.

== Illinois State Senator ==
In February 2012, Pat McGuire was appointed by local Democratic Party leaders to fill the vacancy caused by AJ Wilhelmi’s resignation. After the primary, Pat McGuire was also chosen to replace Wilhelmi as the Democratic nominee for the 2012 election.

As the state senator for the 43rd district, Senator McGuire’s associated representatives were District 85 representative John Connor (D-Lockport) and District 86 representative Larry Walsh Jr (D-Joliet). He was assigned to the committees for Gaming, Environment, Higher Education, and Transportation respectively.

On Monday, September 23, 2019, McGuire announced his intention to retire from the Illinois Senate after the end of his term.
