= Karina Villa =

American politician (born 1978)

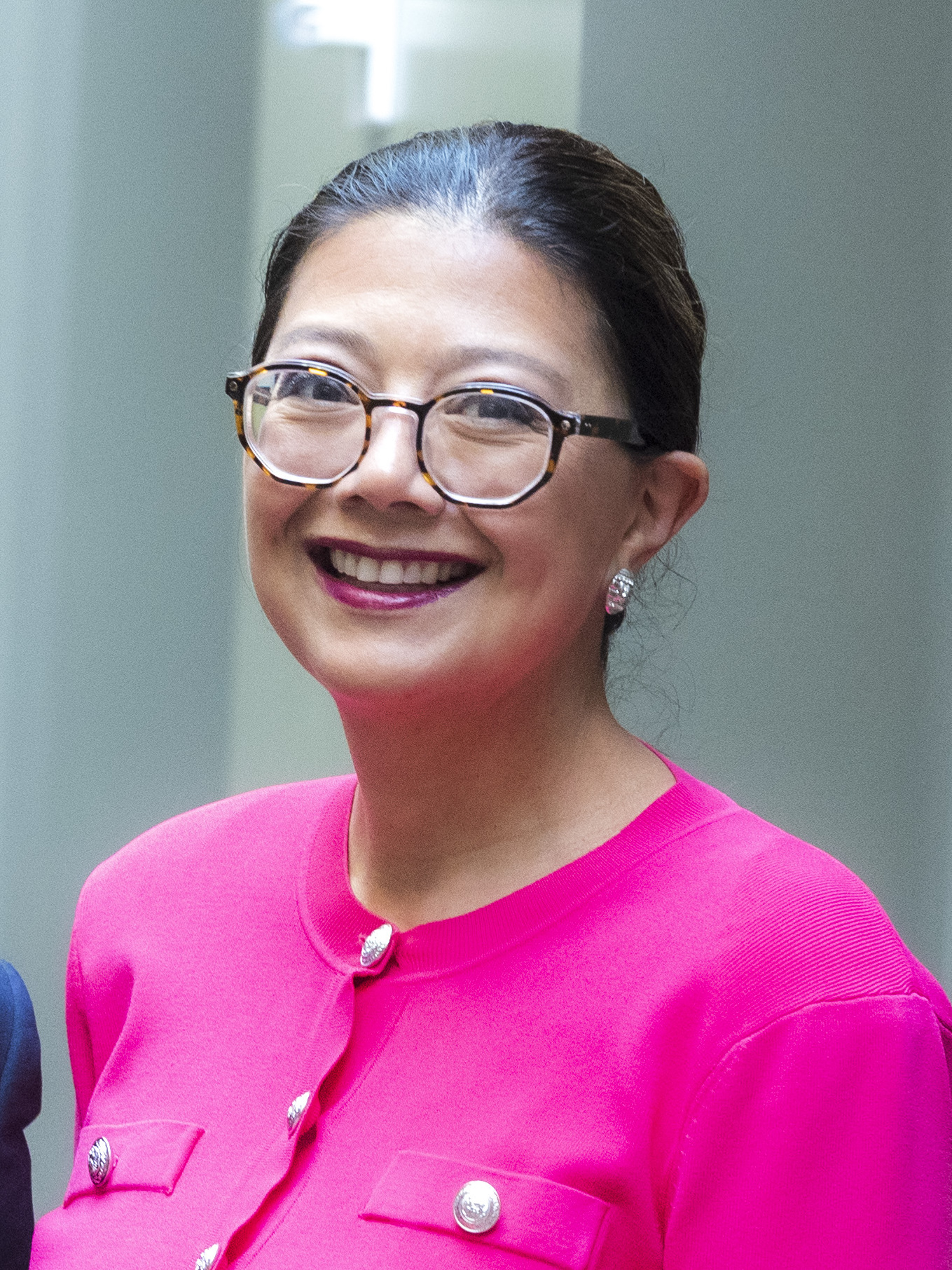
- Villa in 2025

Member of the Illinois Senate from the 25th district
- Incumbent
- Assumed office January 13, 2021
- Preceded by: Jim Oberweis

Member of the Illinois House of Representatives from the 49th district
- In office January 9, 2019 – January 13, 2021
- Preceded by: Mike Fortner
- Succeeded by: Maura Hirschauer

Personal details
- Born: September 20, 1978 (age 47) West Chicago, Illinois, U.S.
- Party: Democratic
- Education: Aurora University (BA, MSW)

Karina Villa (born September 20, 1978) is an American politician serving as a member of the Illinois Senate from the 25th district since 2021. A member of the Democratic Party, she previously served in the Illinois House of Representatives from 2019 to 2021.

Born into an immigrant family and raised in West Chicago, Villa attended Aurora University. After, she began work as a school social worker for the West Chicago School District 33.

Following her role as a school social worker, Villa was elected as a member of the West Chicago District 33 Board of Education.

== Illinois House of Representatives ==
Villa ran for the Illinois House of Representatives position for District 49, where she defeated DuPage County Board member Tonia Khouri in 2018 to succeed retiring incumbent Republican Mike Fortner.

=== 101st General Assembly Committee assignments ===
- Appropriations - Elementary and Secondary Education
- Elementary and Secondary Education School Curriculum Policies
- Healthcare Availability and Access
- Mental Health
- Veterans' Affairs
- Labor and Commerce

=== 101st General Assembly passed bills ===
Villa's tenure during the 101st General Assembly saw her crafting and supporting bills regarding civil rights, environmental protections, labor rights, and access to health care.

==== Health and mental health ====
- SB 1250 ensures schools allow students to self-administer any medication with written authorization by their parent
- HB 3404 ensures public universities and community colleges make mental health and suicide prevention resources available for student information
- SB 459 requires the instruction of mental health and illness to evaluate the intricacy of health by reviewing the relationship between physical and mental health to enhance behaviors and attitudes

==== Environmental protections ====
- SB 1651 expands authority for a forest preserve to grant licenses, easements, and rights-of-way for construction, operation, and maintenance on the property to include facilities for renewable energy
- HB 2076 began January 1, 2020, that no thermal paper shall be manufactured or distributed for business and banking records

==== Labor ====
- HB 3405 enforces payments to be made for the wage claims and penalties as specified by the Department of Labor within 35 days of the final administrative decision

==== Resolutions ====
- HR 0070 declares March as the Social Work Month in the State of Illinois
- HR 0248 urges policy decisions enacted by Illinois State Legislature to take into account the principles of early childhood brain development
- SRJ 21 encourages Illinois State Board of Education, special education cooperatives, and each school district in Illinois to consider benefits of inclusive education for students with and without disabilities
- HR 623 commemorates the 100th Anniversary of women's suffrage
- HR 624 congratulates Coach Jose Villa and the West Chicago Community High School boys soccer team for winning the 2019 IHSA Class 3A Championship
- HR 757 commemorates the 100th Anniversary of the formation of the League of Women Voters for Illinois

== Illinois Senate ==
Villa spent the remaining time for the 101st General Assembly as the elected Senator for the 25th District after incumbent State Senator Jim Oberweis announced his plan to run for the Republican nomination for Illinois' 14th Congressional District, challenging Lauren Underwood. Villa defeated Republican candidate Jeanette Ward and was succeeded by Democrat Maura Hirschauer.

Villa was reelected into the Senate in 2022 to a freshly redrawn 25th District, which left out St. Charles, Oswego, and Yorkville. Villa defeated Republican nominee Heather Brown. Villa was again reelected into the Senate in 2024 against Heather Brown for a four-year term.

During Villa's 2022 campaign, she maintained her support for the SAFE-T Act and campaigned alongside Illinois Governor JB Pritzker, U.S. Representative Delia Ramirez, and the state Representative Maura Hirschauer.

=== Committee assignments ===
In the 25th District, Villa holds four advisory committees for constituents to participate in: mental health, senior, education, and environment and agriculture. Villa was the vice-chairperson of the Senate Behavioral and Mental Health Committee in the 102nd General Assembly. She also serviced on the following Committees: Agriculture, Education, and Pensions.

=== Caucuses ===
Villa currently sits on the board of directors for the Illinois Legislative Latino Caucus. In addition to this, Villa also sits on the Illinois Senate Democratic Caucus, the Illinois State Senate Women's caucus, and the Illinois State Senate Progressive Caucus.

=== 102nd General Assembly passed bills ===
==== Health and mental health ====
- HB 155 allows for recipients of SNAP, WIC, and TANF benefits to use benefits to purchase menstrual hygiene products
- HB 641 requires public universities and community colleges to make free menstrual hygiene products available to students in bathrooms and other facilities
- HB 68 requires interns, residents, and physicians providing medical service to have proper credential and required certificates for ongoing training
- HB 156 requires school districts to make menstrual hygiene products available and free to students
- HB 119 allows for eligible persons to donate a prescription drug or supplies needed to administer a prescription drug
- HB 3879 allocates funding to health care telementoring services designated by the Department of Healthcare and Family Services
- HB 1954 determines the first full week of April to be Autism Awareness Week
- HB 4797 allows clinical social work practices via telehealth for non-residents who had previously established therapeutic relationship with an in-state social worker, as well as for college students with established relationships with in-state social workers
- SB 1633 ensures residents of Nursing Facilities to be treated with courtesy and respect for their individuality by employees and medical professional, maintaining their human and civil rights
- HB 4332 ensures the Health Care Worker Registry includes their information, location and date of the training course, and the date of the individuals last criminal records check

==== Advocacy for vulnerable and marginalized groups ====
- HB 232 makes best efforts to identify for-profit companies that shelter to migrant children, including these companies in a list of restricted companies for purposes of investment distributed to each retirement system and the Illinois State Board of Investment
- SB 4002 allocates $15,000,000 to Free and Charitable Clinics for emergency services, ensuring at least 70% of this funding is used to serve minority populations
- SB 3490 ensures the Council on Aging includes 7 citizen members that represent underrepresented communities, such as LGBTQ+, African-American or Black, and Asian-American or Pacific Islander. Creates the Illinois Commission on LGBTQ Aging to analyze and study the health, housing, financial, psychosocial, and home-and-community-based services

==== Labor ====
- HB 113 employees are entitled to recover damages of 5% of any underpayment in wages
- HB 809 does not enforce the Join Labor and Management Committee to establish a community outreach program or master register for people eligible for full-time firefighter placement
- SB 3651 excludes reportable earnings that increased from periods where a member of the Illinois Municipal Retirement Fund was paid through workers' compensation
- SB 3652 allows for participating employers of the Illinois Municipal Retirement Fund to create an early retirement incentive program

==== Education ====
- SB 234 every public high school may include "media literacy" in their curriculum as a unit of instruction
- HB 290 requires school districts to provide notification to parents/guardians of students with IEPs that they're eligible for additional services and resources
- HB 2400 parents and guardians must be notified of future law enforcement drills at least 5 days prior to the drill. Dills will not mimic actual shooting incidents and must be age appropriate
- HB 3438 requires public universities and community colleges to have a Dream Resource Liaison which connects students without proper authorization to be in the U.S. to resources for financial aid and academic opportunities
- SB 2109 requires school boards and district superintendents to complete course instruction approved by ISBE regarding adopting and administering trauma-informed standards annually
- HB 5214 ensures a parent has an interpreter if needed when developing an IEP or 504 plan for their child

==== Agency advocacy ====
- HB 14 if Department of Financial and Professional Regulation refuses to issue a license or grant registration to an applicant based upon criminal convictions, they shall notify the applicant and provide an explanation for why this conviction impacts their ability to receive such license
- SB 1632 removes provision from the Clinical Social Work and Social Work Practice Act to pass and examination from the Department of Financial and Professional Regulation to be qualified for social work licensure
- SB 2110 ensures the actions determined during child support court cases shall be used in conjunction with other acts and do not require the allocation of parental rights or visitation to a determination supporting their obligation
- HB 3100 requires mandated reporters to complete implicit bias testing, reflection, and training within 3 months of official capacity as a mandated reporter, as well as every three years after
- SB 4024 requires the Department of Aging to make long-term care consumer choice information publicly available on the Internet
- SB 3720 the Illinois Department of Children and Family Services shall establish a 3-year Bias-Free Child Removal Pilot Program to promote unbiased decision-making in the child removal process, intending to decrease overrepresentation of BIPOC children in out-of-home placements

==== Criminal and civil law ====
- HB 1739 ensures the Illinois Attorney General can receive and investigate complaints for the violation of rights of a crime victim
- HB 1742 allows for a family member or household member of a victim of non-consensual sexual conduct and sexual penetration may file a petition for a civil no contact order with the victim's consent
- HB 2427 creates Public Defender Quality Defense Task Force to determine optimal caseload for public defenders and to assess the quality of legal services being offered by public defenders

==== Resolutions ====
- SR 98 declared May 19, 2021 as Hepatitis C Screening Day
- SR 100 urged Congress and the President of the United States to grant the tight and privilege of the U.S. residency to all farm, manufacturing, and agricultural workers who labored during COVID-19 crisis
- SR 101 declared March 2021 as the Social Work Month in the State of Illinois
- SR 226 declared November 4, 2021 as Genetic Counselor Awareness Day in the State of Illinois
- SR 960 declared August, 2022 the "Free and Charitable Clinic Month" to raise awareness of the mission of free and charitable clinics across the State of Illinois
- HJR 79 designated the section of Route 30 in Kendall County from Douglas Road to River Road as "Herschel Luckinbill Road"
- HJR 89 designated the section of Route 31 in the City of Aurora that runs from east Illinois Avenue to east Indian Trail Road as the "Dan Dolan Way"
- SR 681 declares October 2021 as "Manufacturing Month" in the State of Illinois

=== 103rd General Assembly and beyond ===
Villa spent the 103rd General Assembly as a member of the Illinois State Senate. During this Assembly, Villa worked on legislation centered around human rights, environmental issues, labor issues, substance abuse, and access to public health. In the context of the Gaza genocide, Villa spoke out in support of the human rights of Palestinians and backed a bill aimed at repealing a 2015 law prohibiting Illinois' state pension funds from investing in companies boycotting Israel, which she described as a limitation on freedom of speech. Villa has criticized Trump's deportation policy and ICE's actions, stating that "ICE does not keep up safe". She issued community warnings during an ICE raid in Chicago in September 2025, and was seen running through neighborhoods, shouting to not open doors and to stay inside.

== 2026 Illinois State Comptroller campaign ==
In August 2025, Villa announced she was running for the Democratic nomination for Illinois State Comptroller in the 2026 Democratic primary election. She made her campaign announcement at an event in Chicago's Little Village neighborhood, joined by U.S. Representatives Delia Ramirez and Chuy García along with other state and local leaders. Villa said she planned to bring her legislative experience in budget leadership and tax relief to the statewide office.

Villa entered a crowded Democratic primary that included State Representative Margaret Croke, State Representative Stephanie Kifowit, and Lake County Treasurer Holly Kim, among others. Despite not receiving the Cook County Democratic Party's slating endorsement, her campaign highlighted her record flipping competitive districts and her work on state budgets.

On March 17, 2026, she lost the Democratic primary to Croke.

== Electoral history ==
Illinois 49th State House District General Election, 2018
Party	Candidate	Votes	%
Democratic	Karina Villa	22,133	53.81
Republican	Tonia Jane Khouri	18,997	46.19
Total votes		41,130	100.0

Illinois 25th State Senate District General Election, 2020
Party	Candidate	Votes	%
Democratic	Karina Villa	60,238	51.0
Republican	Jeanette Ward	57,976	49.0
Total votes		118,214	100.0
