= Tom Johnson (Illinois politician) =

American politician

Member of the Illinois Senate from the 48th district
- In office January 2011 – January 2013
- Preceded by: Randy Hultgren
- Succeeded by: Andy Manar (redistricted)

Member of the Illinois House of Representatives from the 50th district
- In office January 1993 – January 2003
- Preceded by: Donald Hensel
- Succeeded by: Patricia Reid Lindner

Personal details
- Born: April 30, 1945 Oakland, California, U.S.
- Died: December 3, 2018 (aged 73) Chicago, Illinois, U.S.
- Party: Republican
- Spouse: Virginia “Ginger” Van Der Molen Johnson
- Children: Soren, Derek, and Kirk W. Johnson
- Education: University of Michigan (BA); DePaul University (JD)
- Profession: attorney

Thomas Lee Johnson (April 30, 1945 – December 3, 2018) was a Republican Illinois State Senator. He represented the 48th district in the Illinois Senate from 2011 to 2013. Johnson previously served in the Illinois House of Representatives from 1993 to 2003.

== Early life and education ==
Born in California and raised in South Dakota and Illinois, Johnson was the son of an ordained minister. Johnson graduated from Oak Lawn Community High School in Oak Lawn, Illinois in 1963 and then served in the Army from 1966 until 1968. He then earned a bachelor's degree in political science from the University of Michigan in 1970. He then earned a J.D. degree from the DePaul University College of Law in 1974.

== Professional career ==
Johnson began his career in 1974 as a prosecutor in DuPage County, Illinois, rising to become the chief of its white-collar crime division. Johnson then cofounded his own law firm in 1979. He ran for U.S. Congress as a Republican in 1984, but lost in the primary to John E. Grotberg.

In 1992, Johnson won election to the 50th district in the Illinois House, where he served for the next 10 years. He served in a heavily Republican district that stretched from western DuPage County to St. Charles, Illinois. He chose not to seek re-election in 2002.

Johnson would then go on to serve on the Illinois Prisoner Review Board.

In 2010, Johnson was appointed to an Illinois Senate seat to fill the vacancy left by the ascension of Randy Hultgren to U.S. Congress.

== Death ==
Johnson died of cancer on December 3, 2018.
