= Randy Hultgren =

American politician (born 1966)

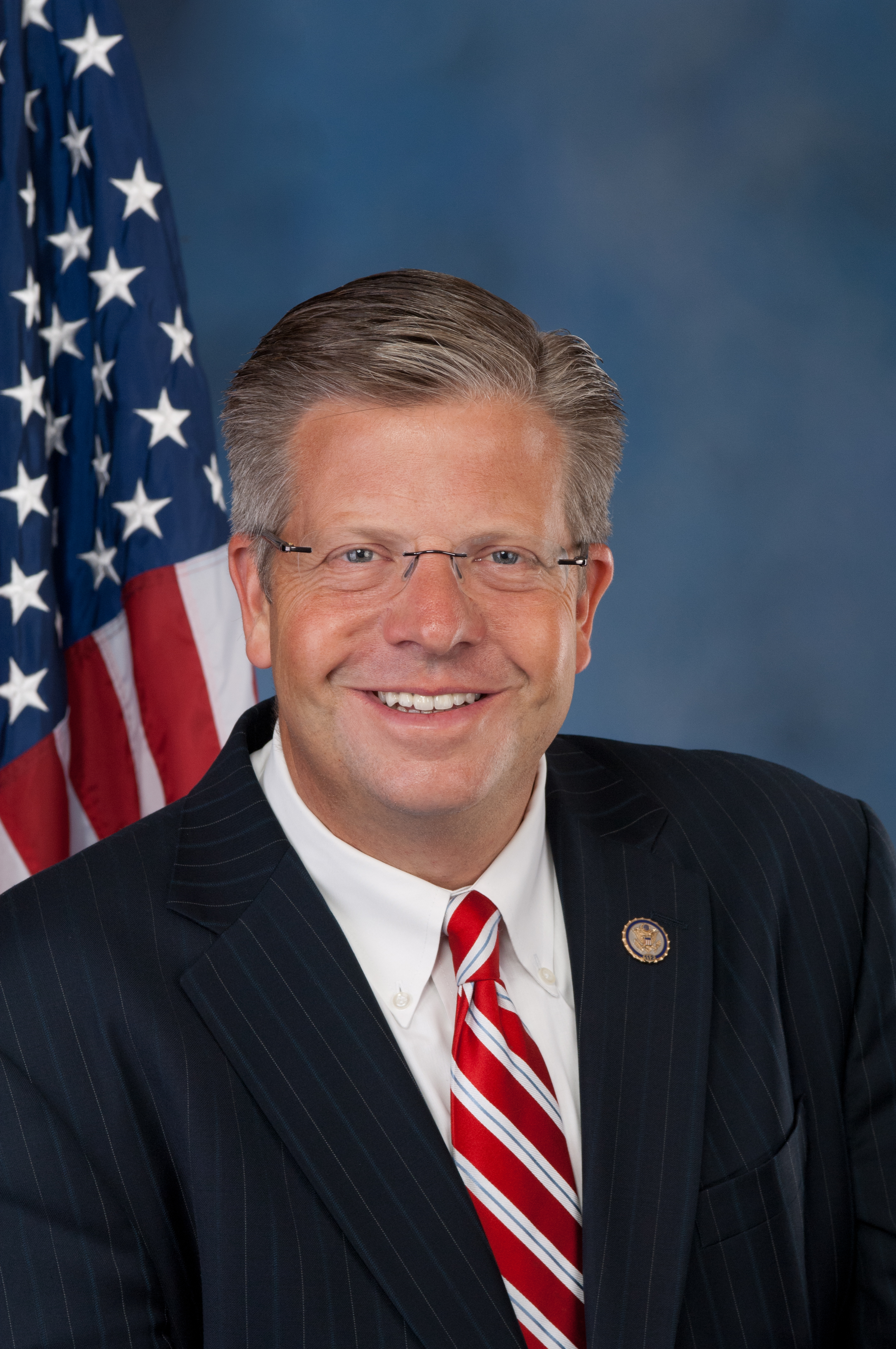

Member of the U.S. House of Representatives from Illinois's 14th district
- In office January 3, 2011 – January 3, 2019
- Preceded by: Bill Foster
- Succeeded by: Lauren Underwood

Member of the Illinois Senate from the 48th district
- In office January 3, 2007 – January 3, 2011
- Preceded by: Peter Roskam
- Succeeded by: Tom Johnson

Member of the Illinois House of Representatives
- In office January 12, 1999 – January 3, 2007
- Preceded by: Peter Roskam
- Succeeded by: Mike Fortner
- Constituency: 40th district (1999–2003); 95th district (2003–2007)

Member of the DuPage County Board from the 4th district
- In office December 5, 1994 – December 7, 1998
- Preceded by: Gwen Henry
- Succeeded by: Paul Didzerekis

Personal details
- Born: Randall Mark Hultgren; March 1, 1966 (age 60) Park Ridge, Illinois, U.S.
- Party: Republican
- Spouse: Christy Hultgren (m. 1991)
- Children: 4
- Education: Bethel University (BA); Illinois Institute of Technology (JD)

Randall Mark Hultgren (/ˈhʌltɡrən/; born March 1, 1966) is an American politician who served as the U.S. representative for Illinois's 14th congressional district from 2011 to 2019. He is a member of the Republican Party.

Hultgren represented the 48th district Senate seat in the Illinois General Assembly from 2007 to 2011. The 48th Senate District includes parts of DuPage, Kane, and Will counties and all or part of Aurora, Batavia, Geneva, Naperville, North Aurora, Warrenville, West Chicago, Wheaton, and Winfield.

In his 2018 reelection campaign, Hultgren was defeated by Democratic nominee Lauren Underwood.

== Early life, education, and early political career ==
Randall Mark "Randy" Hultgren, the youngest of three children of Vernon H. Hultgren and JoAnne R. Hultgren, lived in Park Ridge, Illinois from 1966 to 1977.

In September 1976, Paul W. Hanerhoff, the owner of Hanerhoff Funeral Home in downtown Wheaton, Illinois since 1943, died. In May 1977, Dorothy B. Hanerhoff sold the funeral home to Hultgren's father, and it was called the Hanerhoff-Hultgren Funeral Home until 1987, when it became the Hultgren Funeral Home. The Hultgrens moved from Park Ridge to Wheaton in 1977 and lived upstairs from the funeral home for eight years. Hultgren attended Wheaton Academy in West Chicago, Illinois, graduating in 1984.

Hultgren, whose grandfather was a Baptist pastor, then became the third generation of his family to attend Bethel College & Seminary in Arden Hills, Minnesota, where he earned a B.A. magna cum laude in political science and speech communication in 1988.

He next moved to Washington, D.C. to work as an aide to Republican U.S. Representative Dennis Hastert (IL-14) from 1988 to 1990, where he rose from intern to office manager.

Hultgren then returned to his hometown where in 1990, he purchased a small house and was elected Republican precinct committeeman for Milton Township Precinct 20 in Wheaton, and began attending the Illinois Institute of Technology Chicago-Kent College of Law in Chicago. In 1991 he married Christy L. Nungesser after she graduated from Bethel College. In August 1992 Hultgren had his small house demolished and had a historic 125-year-old Wheaton house he purchased for $1 moved one block west to his lot and had a new foundation poured under it. In 1993 he earned a J.D. from IIT Chicago-Kent.

In October 1993, he announced he would run in the March 1994 Republican primary for the DuPage County Board District 4 seat being vacated by Gwen Henry in her bid to be DuPage County Board Chairman. In the March 1994 Republican primary, the then 27-year-old first-time candidate Hultgren narrowly edged Wheaton City Councilman Grant Eckhoff by only 252 votes, a margin of less than 1%, out of almost 22,000 Republican ballots cast in DuPage County Board District 4. Hultgren received a great deal of support from those who had backed Peter Roskam of Wheaton in Roskam's first campaign for Illinois House District 40 two years earlier. In the November 1994 general election Hultgren and incumbent Republican DuPage County District 4 board member Pat Carr of Wheaton easily defeated their two Democratic opponents. Hultgren served one 4-year term as one of the then all-Republican 24-member DuPage County Board from December 1994 to December 1998. DuPage County Board members at that time also served as DuPage County Forest Commissioners.

== Illinois House of Representatives ==
=== Elections ===
In 1998, incumbent Republican State Representative Peter Roskam of Illinois's 40th House District decided to retire to run for Congress. Hultgren ran and won unopposed. He won reelection to a second term unopposed in 2000. After redistricting, Hultgren decided to run in the newly redrawn 95th House District and defeated Democrat Dirk Enger 61%–37%.

=== Committee assignments ===
Hultgren was on the Death Penalty Committee and the Education Committee.

== Illinois Senate ==
=== Elections ===
In 2006, incumbent State Senator Peter Roskam of Illinois's 48th Senate District decided to retire to run for Congress again. Hultgren ran and won the Republican primary 60%–40% over Naperville City Councilman Dick Furstenau. He won the general election unopposed. In 2008 he won reelection to a second term unopposed.

=== Committee assignments ===
- Senate Committee on Labor (minority spokesperson)
- Senate Committee on Commerce and Economic Development
- Senate Committee on Environment and Energy
- Senate Committee on Housing and Community Affairs
- Senate Committee on Judiciary Civil Law
- Senate Committee on Joint Committee on Administrative Rules

== U.S. House of Representatives ==
=== Elections ===
==== 2010 ====
On September 28, 2009, Hultgren announced his candidacy for the Republican nomination in Illinois's 14th congressional district and won the party's nomination in the February 2 primary election. Hultgren defeated Democratic incumbent Bill Foster 51%–45%.

==== 2012 ====
During his first term, Hultgren represented a hybrid suburban-rural district that stretched from the outer western suburbs of Chicago through Dixon all the way to Cambridge on the other side of the state.

As a result of the decennial reapportionment following the 2010 Census, Illinois lost one seat in the US House of Representatives. The new district map (now with only 18 districts, and drawn by the Democratic-controlled Illinois General Assembly) saw Hultgren's district lose its vast western portion, becoming much more compact and centered around Chicago's outer western suburbs. Notably, it absorbed most of McHenry County, the only collar county Barack Obama did not win in 2012.

The redrawn 14th included areas previously part of the neighboring 8th district, represented by fellow freshman Republican Joe Walsh. The new map drew Walsh's home, along with much of the McHenry County portion of the old 8th, into the 14th. At the same time the 8th was made significantly more Democratic, prompting Walsh to consider challenging Hultgren in the primary for the much friendlier 14th. But soon after Hultgren sought a second term in the 14th, Walsh decided to run in the 8th district. In the general election, Hultgren won reelection to a second term, beating Democratic candidate Dennis Anderson with 59% of the vote.

==== 2014 ====
Hultgren ran for a third term and was opposed by Dennis Anderson for a second time. Hultgren again defeated Anderson, this time with 65% of the vote.

==== 2016 ====
Hultgren defeated Democrat Jim Walz in the November 2016 general election with 59% of the vote.

==== 2018 ====
Hultgren ran for reelection in 2018. He was unopposed in the Republican primary. Lauren Underwood won the March 20 Democratic primary with 57.35% of the vote. Others receiving votes were Matt Brolley, Jim Walz, Victor Swanson, John Hosta, George Weber, and Daniel Roldan-Johnson. Underwood defeated Hultgren in the November general election with 52% of the vote to Hultgren's 48%.

=== Tenure ===
Hultgren served on the Commission on Security and Cooperation in Europe (Helsinki Commission) from 2015 to 2019. In this role, he worked “to promote human rights, stability, and security in the OSCE Parliamentary Assembly (OSCE PA) region," placing “special priority in protecting religious liberties, preventing human rights violations, combating human trafficking, and preventing Russian aggression into neighboring countries.” Hultgren was also a Commissioner on the Congressional-Executive Commission on China, where he worked to "raise awareness about political prisoners who are being deprived of civil and political rights by their own government.”

In February 2017, Hultgren was appointed the co-chair of the Tom Lantos Human Rights Commission, which “promotes international human rights through hearings, briefings and other awareness-building activities, and by providing expertise on key issues”.

=== Committee assignments ===
112th Congress

- Committee on Agriculture
  - Subcommittee on Conservation, Energy, and Forestry
  - Subcommittee on General Farm Commodities and Risk Management
  - Subcommittee on Rural Development, Research, Biotechnology, and Foreign Agriculture
- Committee on Science, Space and Technology
  - Subcommittee on Research and Science Education
  - Subcommittee on Technology and Innovation
  - Subcommittee on Investigations and Oversight
- Committee on Transportation and Infrastructure
  - Subcommittee on Aviation
  - Subcommittee on Economic Development, Public Buildings and Emergency Management
  - Subcommittee on Railroads, Pipelines, and Hazardous Materials

113th Congress

- Committee on Financial Services
  - Subcommittee on Capital Markets and Government Sponsored Enterprises
  - Subcommittee on Oversight and Investigations
- Committee on Science, Space and Technology
  - Subcommittee on Technology and Innovation
  - Subcommittee on Energy and Environment

Hultgren was a member of the Republican Study Committee and the Climate Solutions Caucus.

== Electoral history ==
=== DuPage County Board, 4th District (1994) ===
DuPage County 4th District, Illinois Republican primary, March 15, 1994
Party	Candidate	Votes	%
Republican	Pat Carr (Wheaton) (incumbent) (X)	11,739	34.57
Republican	Randy Hultgren (Wheaton) (X)	10,096	29.74
Republican	Grant Eckhoff (Wheaton)	9,844	28.99
Republican	Martin Gaughan (Wheaton)	2,274	6.70
Total votes		33,953	100.00

DuPage County 4th District, Illinois general election, November 8, 1994
Party	Candidate	Votes	%
Republican	Pat Carr (Wheaton) (incumbent) (X)	30,754	38.83
Republican	Randy Hultgren (Wheaton) (X)	28,015	35.38
Democratic	Maureen Spiegel (Lisle)	11,357	14.34
Democratic	Daniel Bailey (Wheaton)	9,066	11.45
Total votes		79,192	100.00
Republican hold			

=== Illinois House, 40th Representative District (1998, 2000) ===
Illinois 40th Representative District, Illinois Republican primary, March 17, 1998
Party	Candidate	Votes	%
Republican	Randy Hultgren (Wheaton) (X)	10,482	100.00
Total votes		10,482	100.00

Illinois 40th Representative District, Illinois general election, November 3, 1998
Party	Candidate	Votes	%
Republican	Randy Hultgren (Wheaton) (X)	28,425	100.00
Total votes		28,425	100.00
Republican hold			

Illinois 40th Representative District, Illinois Republican primary, March 21, 2000
Party	Candidate	Votes	%
Republican	Randy Hultgren (Wheaton) (incumbent) (X)	13,173	100.00
Total votes		13,173	100.00

Illinois 40th Representative District, Illinois general election, November 3, 2000
Party	Candidate	Votes	%
Republican	Randy Hultgren (Wheaton) (incumbent) (X)	36,555	100.00
Total votes		36,555	100.00
Republican hold			

=== Illinois House, 95th Representative District (2002, 2004) ===
Illinois 95th Representative District, Illinois Republican primary, March 19, 2002
Party	Candidate	Votes	%
Republican	Randy Hultgren (Wheaton) (incumbent) (X)	12,874	100.00
Total votes		12,874	100.00

Illinois 95th Representative District, Illinois general election, November 5, 2002
Party	Candidate	Votes	%
Republican	Randy Hultgren (Winfield) (incumbent) (X)	24,488	85.39
Libertarian	Steve Dubovik (Batavia)	4,191	14.61
Total votes		28,679	100.00
Republican hold			

Illinois 95th Representative District, Illinois Republican primary, March 16, 2004
Party	Candidate	Votes	%
Republican	Randy Hultgren (Winfield) (incumbent) (X)	10,369	100.00
Total votes		10,369	100.00

Illinois 95th Representative District, Illinois general election, November 2, 2004
Party	Candidate	Votes	%
Republican	Randy Hultgren (Winfield) (incumbent) (X)	27,388	60.73
Democratic	Dirk Enger (Winfield)	16,390	36.35
Libertarian	Steve Dubovik (Batavia)	1,317	2.92
Total votes		45,095	100.00
Republican hold			

=== Illinois Senate, 48th Senate District (2006, 2008) ===
Illinois 48th Senate District, Illinois Republican primary, March 21, 2006
Party	Candidate	Votes	%
Republican	Randy Hultgren (Winfield) (X)	14,867	60.21
Republican	Dick Furstenau (Naperville)	9,823	39.79
Total votes		24,690	100.00

Illinois 48th Representative District, Illinois general election, November 7, 2006
Party	Candidate	Votes	%
Republican	Randy Hultgren (Winfield) (X)	48,228	100.00
Total votes		48,228	100.00
Republican hold			

Illinois 48th Senate District, Illinois Republican primary, February 5, 2008
Party	Candidate	Votes	%
Republican	Randy Hultgren (Winfield)(incumbent) (X)	23,567	100.00
Total votes		23,567	100.00

Illinois 48th Representative District, Illinois general election, November 4, 2008
Party	Candidate	Votes	%
Republican	Randy Hultgren (Winfield) (incumbent) (X)	77,310	100.00
Total votes		77,310	100.00
Republican hold			

=== U.S. House, Illinois 14th Congressional District (2010, 2012, 2014, 2016, 2018) ===
Illinois 14th Congressional District, Illinois Republican primary, February 2, 2010
Party	Candidate	Votes	%
Republican	Randy Hultgren (Winfield) (X)	34,833	54.71
Republican	Ethan A. Hastert (Elburn)	28,840	45.29
Total votes		63,673	100.00

Illinois 14th Congressional District, Illinois general election, November 2, 2010
Party	Candidate	Votes	%
Republican	Randy Hultgren (Winfield) (X)	112,369	51.31
Democratic	Bill Foster (Batavia) (incumbent)	98,645	45.04
Green	Daniel J. Kairis (South Elgin)	7,949	3.63
Independent	Doug Marks (write-in)	50	0.02
Total votes		219,013	100.00
Republican gain from Democratic			

Illinois 14th Congressional District, Illinois Republican primary, March 20, 2012
Party	Candidate	Votes	%
Republican	Randy Hultgren (Winfield) (incumbent) (X)	64,419	100.00
Republican	Mark Mastrogiovanni (write-in)	1	0.00
Total votes		64,420	100.00

Illinois 14th Congressional District, Illinois general election, November 6, 2012
Party	Candidate	Votes	%
Republican	Randy Hultgren (Winfield) (incumbent) (X)	177,603	58.82
Democratic	Dennis Anderson (Gurnee)	124,351	41.18
Total votes		301,954	100.00
Republican hold			

Illinois 14th Congressional District, Illinois Republican primary, March 18, 2014
Party	Candidate	Votes	%
Republican	Randy Hultgren (Winfield) (incumbent) (X)	57,665	100.00
Total votes		57,665	100.00

Illinois 14th Congressional District, Illinois general election, November 4, 2014
Party	Candidate	Votes	%
Republican	Randy Hultgren (Plano) (incumbent) (X)	145,369	65.41
Democratic	Dennis Anderson (Gurnee)	76,861	34.59
Total votes		222,230	100.00
Republican hold			

Illinois 14th Congressional District, Illinois Republican primary, March 15, 2016
Party	Candidate	Votes	%
Republican	Randy Hultgren (Plano) (incumbent) (X)	101,299	100.00
Total votes		101,299	100.00

Illinois 14th Congressional District, Illinois general election, November 8, 2016
Party	Candidate	Votes	%
Republican	Randy Hultgren (Plano) (incumbent) (X)	200,508	59.30
Democratic	Jim Walz (Gurnee)	137,589	40.70
Total votes		338,097	100.00
Republican hold			

Illinois 14th Congressional District, Illinois Republican primary, March 20, 2018
Party	Candidate	Votes	%
Republican	Randy Hultgren (Plano) (incumbent) (X)	51,672	100.00
Total votes		51,672	100.00

Illinois's 14th congressional district, 2018
Party	Candidate	Votes	%
Democratic	Lauren Underwood	156,035	52.5
Republican	Randy Hultgren (incumbent)	141,164	47.5
Total votes		297,199	100.0
Democratic gain from Republican			

== Political positions ==
As of July 10, 2017, Hultgren voted with his party in 99.1% of votes so far in the current session of Congress and voted in line with President Donald Trump's position in 97.3% of votes.

During the 2008 Republican Party presidential primaries, Hultgren worked on the presidential campaign of former U.S. Senator Fred Thompson, serving as a congressional district chair for Illinois's 14th congressional district.

Hultgren has been described as a member of the Tea Party movement.

=== Domestic issues ===
==== Education ====
Hultgren has been an advocate for homeschooling, as his 4 children are homeschooled, and he believes that "homeschooling is the ultimate local control." In 2011 Hultgren introduced the Family Educational Records Privacy Extension Act (H.R. 2910), which would have required "parental consent before educational agencies or institutions release the educational records of home-schooled students."

==== Environment ====
Hultgren opposed federal regulation of greenhouse gas emissions. He has described cap-and-trade as "an irresponsible policy".

In 2010, Hultgren signed a pledge sponsored by Americans for Prosperity, promising to vote against any climate-change legislation that would raise taxes. The League of Conservation Voters gave Hultgren an environmental rating of 0% for 2017 and a lifetime rating of 5%.

==== Gun control ====
Hultgren is a strong supporter of the Second Amendment to the United States Constitution. In April 2018, after the Parkland, Florida, school shooting, Hultgren urged schools and police to do a better job of identifying and intervening with people who are potential threats. “We need to do more to make sure people who are speaking out and acting out or have mental challenges don't get weapons, that people who have criminal histories don't get weapons, and when hearing of a threat we respond quickly,” he said.

==== Healthcare ====
Hultgren favored repealing the Affordable Care Act (Obamacare). On May 4, 2017, he voted to repeal Obamacare and pass the American Health Care Act.

Hultgren supported a bill that would allow employers to exclude veterans receiving health insurance from the United States Department of Defense or the United States Department of Veterans' Affairs from their list of employees. This would keep their list of employees shorter, allowing some small businesses to fall underneath the 50 full-time employees line that would require them to provide their employees with healthcare under the Affordable Care Act.

==== Identity fraud ====
Hultgren and 3 other members of Congress sponsored the Protecting Children from Identity Theft Act, H.R. 5192, which would require the Social Security Administration (SSA) to take a more active role in preventing identity theft.

==== Donald Trump ====
Hultgren endorsed Republican nominee Donald Trump in the 2016 presidential election.

=== Economic issues ===
==== National debt ====
In 2013, Hultgren voted for legislation stop an increase of the debt limit, which led to a government shutdown. He was the only congressperson from Illinois to vote against an agreement to reopen government and end the government shutdown.

==== Taxes ====
Hultgren sponsored legislation to repeal the estate tax and voted to repeal it several times.

In November 2017, Hultgren and Peter Roskam introduced the Bring Small Business Back Tax Reform Act as part of the Trump Administration's tax reform package. Hultgren said the bill was intended “to cut the overall small business tax rate to 25 percent,” a change he said would “provide much-needed relief to the engine of Illinois's economy.”

==== Tariffs ====
In June 2018, Hultgren and Roskam expressed their disapproval of Trump's plan to impose tariffs on Mexico, Canada, and the European Union. “There's real concern about what an escalating trade war would mean,” said Hultgren, who articulated concern about the impact of such tariffs on manufacturers and farmers in his district.

==== Budget ====
Hultgren supported a balanced budget amendment to the U.S. Constitution.

Hultgren and Andy Barr (R-KY) introduced legislation that would compel the Government Accountability Office (GAO) to study the privacy risks associated with the Consumer Financial Protection Bureau's Home Mortgage Disclosure Act rule. The legislation would also prohibit depository institutions, the CFPB, and the Federal Financial Institutions Examination Council from making available to the public any information gathered in accordance with the Home Mortgage Disclosure Act.

==== Banking ====
On March 6, 2018, the House passed without opposition H.R. 4725, the Community Bank Reporting Relief Act, sponsored by Hultgren and two other Members of Congress. The law simplifies reporting requirements for community banks. “The role of smaller financial institutions is especially important in more rural areas, such as my district, where larger banks tend to not have as many branches”, said Hultgren.

==== Corporations ====
Hultgren was a vocal opponent of the Dodd–Frank Wall Street Reform and Consumer Protection Act, which created new financial regulations after the 2008 financial crisis. He called Dodd-Frank "flawed" and introduced Republican-backed legislation to end it. Hultgren supported the Financial CHOICE Act, another Republican-backed bill to dismantle Dodd-Frank; the legislation would have eliminated the Treasury Department's Office of Financial Research, killed the Volcker Rule (which bars certain banks from particular risky trades); killed the Orderly Liquidation Authority (which allows the federal government to shut down failing banks that post a systemic risk to the economy); and removed a provision imposing greater oversight on "systemically important financial institutions." Hultgren introduced the Swaps Regulatory Improvement Act into the House in March 2013; the bill would have rolled back Dodd-Frank regulations and expand banks' authority to use swaps to hedging risk. The bill passed the House but not the Senate and did not become law.

Hultgren was a strong advocate of municipal finance and tax-exempt municipal bonds. In 2013 he joined with fellow U.S. Representative Dutch Ruppersberger (D-MD) in securing the signatures of 137 House Republicans and Democrats in a letter urging congressional leaders to "reject any proposal to cap or eliminate the deduction on tax-exempt municipal bonds used to finance the vast majority of infrastructure projects in America’s communities." The two circulated a similar letter in 2015 and formed the Municipal Finance Caucus in 2016.

=== International issues ===
==== Immigration ====
"Immigration is a foundational part of who we are...to be a place of refuge," Hultgren told the Chicago Tribune in September 2017. "I understand that there are bad actors and terrorists out there ... but I don't want to shut off opportunity for people who really need refuge."

In December 2015, citing religious freedom, Hultgren criticized presidential candidate Donald Trump's proposal to ban Muslims from entering the U.S. “Singling out any faith community for the actions of extremists is not conservative, it is hostile to our founding,” he said.

==== Human rights in China ====
In September 2017, Hultgren hosted a screening of Chinese dissident artist Ai Weiwei's film Human Flow, about the refugee crisis in 23 countries. The Chicago Tribune wrote that Hultgren had "taken up the cause of Zhu Yufu, a Chinese dissident poet jailed for publishing pro-democracy poetry."

On February 14, 2018, Hultgren delivered a statement on the House floor wishing a happy birthday to Zhu Yufu, a prisoner of conscience in China, and calling on Chinese authorities to release him from detention. Hultgren had “adopted” Zhu Yufu to highlight his plight as part of the Defending Freedoms Project, a joint effort by the Tom Lantos Human Rights Commission, the U.S. Commission on International Religious Freedom (USCIRF), and Amnesty International USA. The next day the Lantos Commission, which Hultgren co-chaired, hosted a hearing on prisoners of conscience.

==== Russia ====
Hultgren supported H.R. 3364, the Countering America's Adversaries Through Sanctions Act, which became law in August 2017. It authorized sanctions against Iran, North Korea, and Russia. Hultgren also welcomed the indictment in February 2018 of 13 Russian nationals and 3 Russian entities. In March 2018, he expressed approval of Congressional sanctions on “Russian individuals and entities” who had engaged in “long-running, coordinated and malicious attempts to influence and disrupt our American elections and political system.” He also welcomed the Trump administration's implementation of the sanctions. “These actions send a clear message that our electoral system is not to be tampered with, and the United States will respond when we or our allies are attacked”, Hultgren said.

=== Social issues ===
==== Abortion ====
Hultgren was identified by Vote Smart as anti-abortion. He favored a prohibition on embryonic stem cell research.

==== Sex education ====
Hultgren sponsored legislation to allocate $110 million per year in federal grants for abstinence education in schools.

==== LGBT rights ====
Hultgren opposed same-sex marriage. He voted to uphold the Defense of Marriage Act. In 2015, Hultgren cosponsored a resolution to amend the Constitution to ban same-sex marriage.

==== Basic research ====
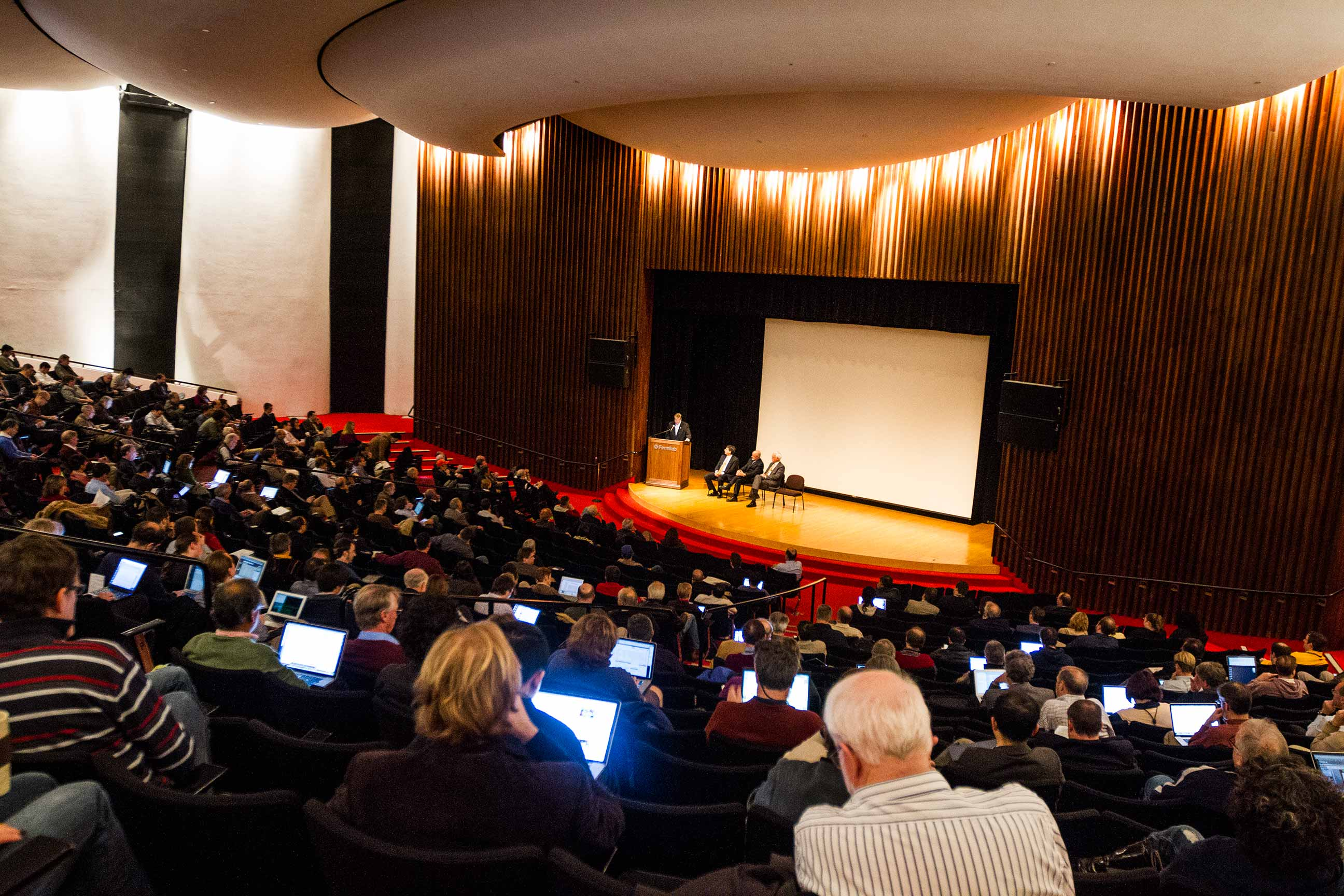
Congressman Hultgren receives the Champion of Science Award at Fermi National Accelerator Lab's Wilson Hall, presented by lab director Pier Oddone and University of Illinois President Bob Easter

Hultgren was described by the American Physical Society as an "outspoken advocate for basic scientific research and STEM education." According to NBC Chicago, "the conservative Republican has carved a reputation as a pro-science, pro-STEM education supporter."

Hultgren went on record to note that "The U.S. research system is unique. We’ve found an incredibly powerful combination, wedding education and research by incorporating universities, user facilities and Department of Energy resources. But this system is only as stable our commitment to it, which is why sustained and predictable research funding is crucial."

Along with then United States Senator Mark Udall (D-CO), Hultgren was awarded the George Brown Science Technology Engineering Leadership award by the Science, Technology, Engineering Working Group, a coalition of pro-science groups including The American Association for the Advancement of Science, the American Institute of Physics, and ASME.

In October 2012, Hultgren was a recipient of the Champion of Science Award by the Science Coalition, a nonprofit advocacy group composed of the 50 leading research universities in the United States. The award was presented by Fermilab Director Pier Oddone and University of Illinois President Robert Easter along with University of Chicago President Robert Zimmer, who said, "Congressman Hultgren provides a strong voice for science in Congress."

Hultgren introduced the American Super Computing Leadership Act (H.R. 2495; 113th Congress) in the House on June 25, 2013. The bill would require the United States Department of Energy to improve and increase its use of high-end computers, especially exascale computing, through an organized research program.

=== Women's rights ===
Hultgren voted against reauthorizing the Violence Against Women Act in 2013.

== Personal life ==
In 2002, Hultgren moved 4 miles southwest from Wheaton to adjacent Winfield, Illinois. In 2014, he moved 22 miles southwest from Winfield in DuPage County to Plano, Illinois, in Kendall County. Hultgren lives in Plano with his wife, Christy, and their four children, who have been home-schooled.

He is an evangelical Christian and a member of Wheaton Bible Church.

Illinois House of Representatives
Preceded by Peter Roskam	Member of the Illinois House of Representatives from the 40th district 1999–2003	Succeeded by Rich Bradley
Preceded by Richard P. Myers	Member of the Illinois House of Representatives from the 95th district 2003–2007	Succeeded by Mike Fortner
Illinois Senate
Preceded by Peter Roskam	Member of the Illinois Senate from the 48th district 2007–2011	Succeeded by Tom Johnson
U.S. House of Representatives
Preceded by Bill Foster	Member of the U.S. House of Representatives from Illinois's 14th congressional district 2011–2019	Succeeded by Lauren Underwood
Preceded by Joe Pitts	Chair of the House Human Rights Commission; 2017–2019	Succeeded by Jim McGovern
U.S. order of precedence (ceremonial)
Preceded by Wayne Dowdy as Former U.S. Representative	Order of precedence of the United States as Former U.S. Representative	Succeeded by Glen Browder as Former U.S. Representative
