= Maura Hirschauer =

American politician

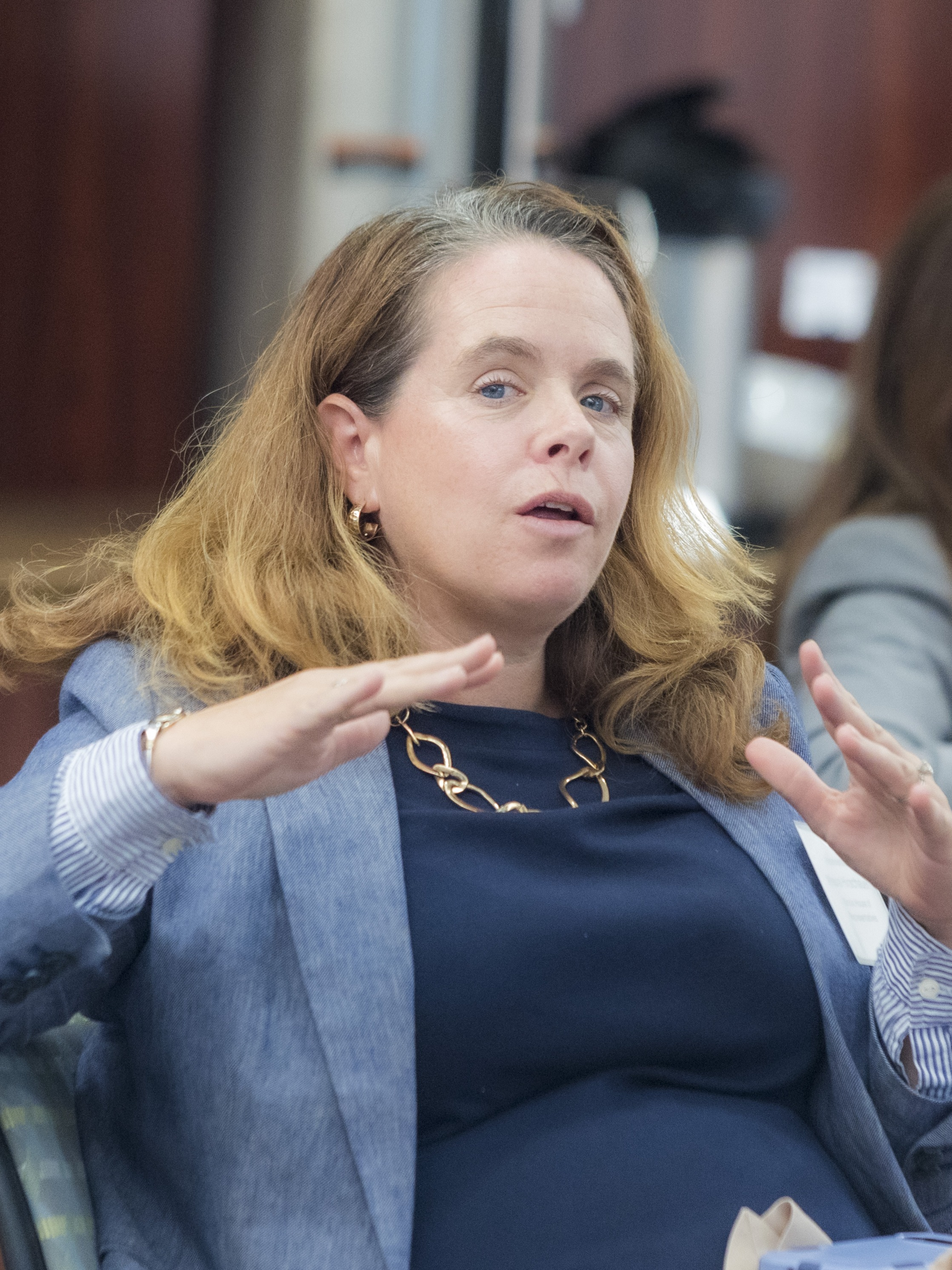

Member of the Illinois House of Representatives from the 49th district
- Incumbent
- Assumed office January 13, 2021
- Preceded by: Karina Villa

Personal details
- Party: Democratic
- Spouse: Jim Hirschauer
- Children: 3
- Education: Colby College (BA)
- Occupation: Illinois State Representative
- Profession: Educator
- Committees: Appropriations-Elementary & Secondary Education; Elementary & Secondary Education: School Curriculum & Policies; Prescription Drug Affordability; Child Care Access & Early Childhood; Housing; Veterans' Affairs
- Website: Illinois General Assembly

Maura Hirschauer is an educator, politician, and a Democratic member of the Illinois House of Representatives from the 49th District. She was first elected to the position in 2020. The 49th District includes parts of Batavia, West Chicago, South Elgin, Wayne, Bartlett, and tiny portions of Aurora and Geneva.

== Illinois House of Representatives ==
Hirschauer ran in the 2020 Democratic primary to succeed the outgoing State Representative, Karina Villa. Hirschauer won the uncontested primary and went on to win the 2020 general election. She was sworn into office on 13 January 2021.

In 2022, Hirschauer won a second term, defeating Republican Kevin Wallace, the mayor of Bartlett.

=== Committee assignments ===
In the 102nd General Assembly, Hirschauer served on the House Committees on Appropriations - Elementary & Secondary Education; Elementary & Secondary Education: School Curriculum & Policies; Prescription Drug Affordability and Accessibility; Child Care Accessibility & Early Childhood Education; Housing; and Veterans' Affairs.

In the 103rd General Assembly, Hirschauer is the Vice Chair of the Child Care Access & Early Childhood Committee. She also serves on the Appropriations - Health & Human Services Committee, Appropriations - Elementary & Secondary Education Committee, Energy & Environment Committee, and Housing Committee.

=== Legislation ===
Several bills proposed by Hirschauer have become law in Illinois. This includes HB1739, which overhauled the Code of Criminal Procedure Act of 1963 and provided a route for law enforcement to develop a sexual assault evidence tracking system, as well as HB1742, which allowed family members and household members of victims of non-consensual sexual conduct to petition for a civil no-contact order against the perpetrator with the victim's permission.

== Personal life ==
Hirschauer graduated from Colby College with a B.A. in English and received her primary education certification from the University of Colorado. She worked as a 3rd and 4th grade teacher in the Denver, Colorado area and in Portola Valley, California and before leaving the profession to spend more time raising her children. However, Hirschauer later resumed teaching and instructed ESL classes and "literacy to elementary students in a volunteer program."

After she and her family moved to Batavia, Illinois, Hirschauer joined and eventually became President of the Batavia Mothers' Club Foundation. In January 2018, she helped found the Kane and Kendall chapter of Moms Demand Action and has played an active role since its founding. She and her family worked as canvassers during the 2018 elections "for capable, inspiring candidates that they believed could enact real change."

== Electoral history ==
Illinois 49th State House District General Election, 2020
Party	Candidate	Votes	%
Democratic	Maura Hirschauer	29,288	54.22
Republican	Laura Curtis	24,725	45.78
Total votes		54,013	100.0

Illinois 49th State House District General Election, 2022
Party	Candidate	Votes	%
Democratic	Maura Hirschauer	16,859	54.09
Republican	Kevin Wallace	14,309	45.91
Total votes		31,168	100.0
