= Illinois Legislative Latino Caucus =

Coordinates: 39.817°N 89.686°W

- House Chair: Aaron Ortiz
- Senate Co-Chair: Cristina Castro
- Senate Co-Chair: Karina Villa
- Founded: 2002; 24 years ago
- Headquarters: Springfield, Illinois
- Membership: 15 Legislators
- Seats in Illinois House of Representatives: 9 / 118
- Seats in Illinois Senate: 6 / 59

Website
- Website

The Illinois Legislative Latino Caucus (ILLC), also known as the Illinois Latinx Caucus, is a bloc of state legislators in the Illinois General Assembly, composed of legislators of Latino heritage. As of the 102nd General Assembly, the ILLC has 15 members across the Illinois House of Representatives and Illinois Senate.

== About ==
The primary mission of the Illinois Legislative Latino Caucus is to empower Illinois Latinos and assure equitable representation in the General Assembly and promote legislative action directed to address those interests.

Specific caucus priorities include:

- Increasing access to resources that benefit Latinos in Illinois
- Forming and sustaining partnerships with businesses and organizations to enhance opportunities for Latinos in Illinois
- Supporting the widespread distribution of information on public policy that impact Latinos in Illinois
- Providing resources for young Latinos in Illinois to succeed in education

Since 2002, the ILLCF has provided college bound students across the state with scholarships. The ILLCF college scholarship has granted close to $1,000,000 to more than 500 students in Illinois.

== Membership ==
=== Current House members ===
As of January 13, 2021, the 102nd General Assembly of the Illinois House of Representatives consists of the following members:

District	Representative	Party	Residence	Took Office
1	Aaron Ortiz	Democratic	Chicago	2019
3	Eva-Dina Delgado	Democratic	Chicago	2019 Ɨ
4	Delia Ramirez	Democratic	Chicago	2018 Ɨ
21	Edgar González Jr.	Democratic	Chicago	2020 Ɨ
22	Angelica Guerrero-Cuellar	Democratic	Chicago	
24	Elizabeth Hernandez	Democratic	Cicero	2007
40	Jaime Andrade Jr.	Democratic	Chicago	2013 Ɨ
44	Fred Crespo	Democratic	Hoffman Estates	2007
83	Barbara Hernandez	Democratic	Aurora	2019 Ɨ
85	Dagmara Avelar	Democratic	Bolingbrook	2020 Ɨ

- Ɨ Legislator was appointed to the Illinois House of Representatives during session.

=== Current Senate members ===
As of January 13, 2021, the 102nd General Assembly of the Illinois Senate consists of the following members:

District	Senator	Party	Residence	Took Office
1	Antonio Munoz	Democratic	Chicago	1999
2	Omar Aquino	Democratic	Chicago	2016 Ɨ
11	Celina Villanueva	Democratic	Chicago	2020 Ɨ
20	Cristina Pacione-Zayas	Democratic	Chicago	2020 Ɨ
22	Cristina Castro	Democratic	Elgin	2017
25	Karina Villa	Democratic	West Chicago	2020 Ɨ

- Ɨ Legislator was appointed to the Illinois Senate during session.

== See also ==
- Illinois Legislative Black Caucus
- Chicago City Council Latino Caucus
