= Swaps Regulatory Improvement Act =

- Long title: To amend provisions in section 716 of the Dodd–Frank Wall Street Reform and Consumer Protection Act relating to Federal assistance for swaps entities.
- Announced in: the 113th United States Congress
- Sponsored by: Rep. Randy Hultgren (R, IL-14)
- Number of co-sponsors: 3

Codification
- Acts affected: Dodd–Frank Wall Street Reform and Consumer Protection Act, Federal Deposit Insurance Act, Securities Exchange Act of 1934
- U.S.C. sections affected: 12 U.S.C. § 1813, 15 U.S.C. § 8305, 15 U.S.C. § 78c

Legislative history
- Introduced in the House as H.R. 992 by Rep. Randy Hultgren (R, IL-14) on March 6, 2013; Committee consideration by United States House Committee on Financial Services, United States House Committee on Agriculture, United States House Financial Services Subcommittee on Capital Markets and Government-Sponsored Enterprises, United States Senate Committee on Banking, Housing, and Urban Affairs; Passed the House on October 30, 2013 (Roll Call Vote 569: 292–122)

The Swaps Regulatory Improvement Act (H.R. 992) is a bill that would amend the Dodd–Frank Wall Street Reform and Consumer Protection Act. The Swaps Regulatory Improvement Act would improve the ability of banks to use swaps as a tool for hedging risk. If Dodd–Frank is not amended, non-bank institutions will have to do many of the swap trades instead. H.R. 992 passed the House during the 113th United States Congress.

== Background on Dodd–Frank's Section 716 ==
The initial version of the Swaps Push-Out provision which became Dodd–Frank's section 716 was proposed by Senator Blanche Lincoln (Democrat of Arkansas) in 2010, during her re-election campaign. The proposal would have prohibited bank swap dealers from receiving federal assistance from the FDIC or from the discount window of the Federal Reserve. After intense negotiation in the last days of congressional debate on Dodd–Frank, Senator Lincoln's version was substantially narrowed to only prohibit banks from dealing in swaps that were viewed by Congress as the most risky.

The Swaps Push-Out that ultimately passed as part of Dodd–Frank prohibited bank swap dealers (with access to FDIC insurance or the discount window) from dealing in certain swaps (or security-based swaps), including most credit default swaps (CDS), equity swaps, and many commodity swaps. Swaps related to rates, currencies, or underlying assets that national banks may hold (e.g., loans) were allowed to remain in the bank, as were swaps used for hedging or similar risk mitigation activities.

== Provisions of the bill ==
This summary is based largely on the summary provided by the Congressional Research Service, a public domain source.

The Swaps Regulatory Improvement Act would amend the Dodd–Frank Wall Street Reform and Consumer Protection Act with respect to the prohibition against certain federal assistance to swaps entities, namely the use of any advances from specified Federal Reserve credit facilities or discount windows, or Federal Deposit Insurance Corporation (FDIC) insurance or guarantees, for the purpose of: (1) making any loan to, or purchasing any stock, equity interest, or debt obligation of, any swaps entity; (2) purchasing the assets of any swaps entity; (3) guaranteeing any loan or debt issuance of any swaps entity; or (4) entering into any assistance arrangement (including tax breaks), loss sharing, or profit sharing with any swaps entity.

The bill would extend to any major swap participant or major security-based swap participant that is an uninsured U.S. branch or agency of a foreign bank the exemption from the prohibition against federal assistance to swaps entities which is currently limited to any major swap participant or major security-based swap participant that is an FDIC-insured bank or savings association.

The bill would designate both uninsured U.S. branches or agencies of a foreign bank and insured depository institutions as "covered depository institutions."

The bill would require any covered depository institution exempted from the prohibition to limit its swap and security-based swap activities to hedging and similar risk mitigating activities (as under current law), non-structured finance swap activities, or certain structured finance swap activities. (The bill would define "structured finance swap" as a swap or security-based swap based on an asset-backed security (or group or index primarily composed of asset-backed securities).)

The bill would qualify a structured finance swap activity for the exemption if: (1) it is undertaken for hedging or risk management purposes, or (2) each asset-backed security underlying the structured finance swap is of a credit quality and of a type or category with respect to which the prudential regulators have jointly adopted rules authorizing such a swap or security-based swap activity by covered depository institutions.

Finally, the bill would repeal the exemption from the prohibition for any insured depository institution that limits its swap and security-based swap activities to acting as a swaps entity for: (1) swaps or security-based swaps involving rates or reference assets that are permissible for investment by a national bank; or (2) credit default swaps, including those referencing the credit risk of asset-backed securities unless they are cleared by a derivatives clearing organization or a clearing agency registered, or exempt from registration, under the Commodity Exchange Act or the Securities Exchange Act.

== Congressional Budget Office report ==
This summary is based largely on the summary provided by the Congressional Budget Office, as ordered reported by the House Committee on Agriculture on March 20, 2013. This is a public domain source.

H.R. 992 would allow certain financial firms to retain their financial portfolios containing swaps while remaining eligible for assistance from the Federal Reserve and Federal Deposit Insurance Corporation (FDIC). A swap is a contract between two parties to exchange payments based on the price of an underlying asset or change in interest, exchange, or other reference rate. Swaps can be used to hedge or mitigate certain risks associated with a firm's traditional activities, such as interest rate risk, or to speculate based on expected changes in prices and rates.

The Congressional Budget Office (CBO) estimates that enacting this legislation would not have a significant impact on the net cash flows of the Federal Reserve or the FDIC over the next 10 years. Enacting this legislation could affect direct spending and revenues; therefore, pay-as-you-go procedures apply. However, the CBO estimates that any such effects would be insignificant for the next 10 years.

Under current law, federal assistance is not available to any swap dealer or major swap participant registered with the Securities and Exchange Commission or the Commodity Futures Trading Commission. Federal assistance includes access to any Federal Reserve credit facility and discount window (with some exception) and FDIC deposit insurance and guarantees. This prohibition does not apply to a major swap participant that is an insured depository institution (IDI) or an IDI acting as a swaps dealer for hedging purposes or for swaps involving bank-permissible securities. (Such swaps include those that reference interest rates, currencies, government securities, and precious metals. Examples of non-permissible swaps include equity swaps, commodity and agriculture swaps, energy swaps, and metal swaps excluding gold and silver.) Under current law, IDIs that do not meet these exceptions must "push out" their swaps portfolio to a separately capitalized affiliate if the firm is part of a financial holding company, or cease these activities altogether.

Similar to the exemption currently granted to IDIs, H.R. 992 would allow uninsured U.S. branches or agencies of a foreign bank to engage in certain permissible swap activities and to push out others to an affiliate without jeopardizing access to federal assistance. In addition, the legislation would expand permissible swap activities to exclude only swaps based on asset-backed securities that are unregulated or not of a credit quality established by regulation.

Enacting this legislation could affect direct spending and revenues if a change in swaps activity affects the financial stability of an IDI or other entity with access to assistance from the Federal Reserve and the FDIC. Because current law only affects IDIs that are swaps dealers and a small percentage of swap contracts, the CBO estimates that any changes to the net cash flows of either agency would be insignificant for the next 10 years.

H.R. 992 contains no intergovernmental or private-sector mandates as defined in the Unfunded Mandates Reform Act and would not affect the budgets of state, local, or tribal governments.

== Procedural history ==
=== House ===
The Swaps Regulatory Improvement Act was introduced into the United States House of Representatives on March 6, 2013, by Rep. Randy Hultgren (R, IL-14). It was referred to the United States House Committee on Financial Services, the United States House Committee on Agriculture, and the United States House Financial Services Subcommittee on Capital Markets and Government-Sponsored Enterprises. It was reported alongside House Report 113-229 part 1 and House Report 113-229 part 2. On October 25, 2013, House Majority Leader Eric Cantor announced that H.R. 992 would be on the House schedule for the week of October 28, 2013. On October 30, 2013, the House voted in Roll Call Vote 569 to pass the bill 292–122. Two hundred twenty-two Republicans voted in favor of the bill; one hundred nineteen Democrats voted against it.

=== Senate ===
The Swaps Regulatory Improvement Act was received in the United States Senate on October 31, 2013, and was referred to the United States Senate Committee on Banking, Housing, and Urban Affairs.

=== President ===
President of the United States of America Barack Obama released a statement on October 28, 2013, that announced the administration's opposition of H.R. 992. According to the administration, regulators have "made meaningful progress toward full implementation of Title VII" of the Dodd–Frank Wall Street Reform and Consumer Protection Act. Until these regulators have finished working, the White House does not believe any changes should be made to the law. The White House did not threaten to veto the bill at this time.

== Debate and discussion ==
Rep. Pete Sessions argued in favor of the bill, stating that if section 716 of Dodd-Frank were not amended, its implementation "would create unnecessary instability in domestic markets and potentially restrict access to those financial services instruments."

== See also ==
- List of bills in the 113th United States Congress
- Swap (finance)
- Dodd–Frank Wall Street Reform and Consumer Protection Act
