= Mike Fortner =

American politician

Member of the Illinois House of Representatives from the 49th district 95th district (2007-2013)
- In office 2007–2019
- Preceded by: Randy Hultgren
- Succeeded by: Karina Villa

Personal details
- Born: June 6, 1958 (age 68) Chicago, Illinois
- Party: Republican
- Spouse: Rebecca
- Profession: Physicist

Mike Fortner (born June 6, 1958) is a former Republican member of the Illinois House of Representatives, representing the 49th district. He has also been a researcher at Fermilab since 1987, and a professor at Northern Illinois University since 1993. Before election to the House, he had been the Mayor of West Chicago, Illinois.

On November 7, 2006, he defeated Democratic candidate Dirk Enger, succeeding Randy Hultgren, who was elected to the Illinois State Senate in the 48th district. He announced August 7, 2017, he would not seek reelection. In the election to succeed Fortner, Karina Villa defeated DuPage County Board member Tonia Khouri.

Fortner holds a Ph.D. in physics from Brandeis University.

House Minority Leader Jim Durkin appointed Fortner to the Census Advisory Panel for a term beginning June 25, 2019. The Census Advisory Panel advisory board to the Census Office within the Department of Human Services to ensure complete and accurate census count for the 2020 United States Census.

== Electoral history ==
- 2006 Election for State Representative 95th district
  - Mike Fortner (R) 60.61%
  - Dirk Enger (D) 39.39%
- 2008 Election for State Representative 95th district
  - Mike Fortner (R) 76.29%
  - Gerard Schmitt (G) 23.71%
- 2010 Election for State Representative 95th district
  - Mike Fortner (R) 62.52%
  - Maria Owens (D) 37.48%
- 2012 Election for State Representative 49th district
  - Mike Fortner (R) unopposed
- 2014 Election for State Representative 49th district
  - Mike Fortner (R) unopposed
- 2016 Election for State Representative 49th district
  - Mike Fortner (R) unopposed
