= United States House Science Subcommittee on Technology =

One of six subcommittees of the US House Committee on Science and Technology

The Science Subcommittee on Technology is one of six subcommittees of the United States House Committee on Science and Technology.

== Jurisdiction ==
The subcommittee has legislative jurisdiction and general and special oversight and investigative authority on all matters relating to competitiveness, technology, and environmental research, development, and demonstration including:

- standardization of weights and measures including technical standards, standardization, and conformity assessment;
- measurement, including the metric system of measurement;
- the Technology Administration of the Department of Commerce;
- the National Institute of Standards and Technology;
- the National Technical Information Service;
- competitiveness, including small business competitiveness;
- tax, antitrust, regulatory and other legal and governmental policies as they relate to technological development and commercialization;
- technology transfer, including civilian use of defense technologies;
- patent and intellectual property policy;
- international technology trade;
- research, development, and demonstration activities of the Department of Transportation;
- surface and water transportation research, development, and demonstration programs;
- earthquake programs (except for NSF) and fire research programs including those related to wildfire proliferation research and prevention;
- biotechnology policy;
- research, development, demonstration, and standards related activities of the Department of Homeland Security;
- scientific issues related to environmental policy, including climate change;
- Small Business Innovation Research and Technology Transfer; and
- voting technologies and standards.

== History ==
Chairs of the subcommittee:

- Thomas Massie, (R), 2013–present
- Ben Quayle (R), 2011–2013
- David Wu (D), 2007-2011
- Vern Ehlers (R), 2005-2007

== Members, 113th Congress ==
Majority	Minority
Thomas Massie, Kentucky, Chairman; Andy Harris, Maryland; Randy Hultgren, Illinois; David Schweikert, Arizona; Jim Bridenstine, Oklahoma	Frederica Wilson, Florida, Ranking Member; Scott Petes, California; Derek Kilmer, Washington
Ex officio
Lamar S. Smith, Texas	Eddie Bernice Johnson, Texas
