= American Super Computing Leadership Act =

- Long title: To amend the Department of Energy High-End Computing Revitalization Act of 2004 to improve the high-end computing research and development program of the Department of Energy, and for other purposes.
- Announced in: the 113th United States Congress
- Sponsored by: Rep. Randy Hultgren (R, IL-14)
- Number of co-sponsors: 9

Codification
- Acts affected: Department of Energy High-End Computing Revitalization Act of 2004, Higher Education Act of 1965
- U.S.C. sections affected: 15 U.S.C. § 5541, 15 U.S.C. § 5542, 20 U.S.C. § 1001
- Agencies affected: United States Congress, United States Department of Energy

Legislative history
- Introduced in the House as H.R. 2495 by Rep. Randy Hultgren (R, IL-14) on June 25, 2013; Committee consideration by United States House Committee on Science, Space and Technology, United States House Science Subcommittee on Energy

The American Super Computing Leadership Act (H.R. 2495) is a bill that would require the United States Department of Energy to improve and increase its use of high-end computers, especially exascale computing, through an organized research program.

The bill was introduced into the United States House of Representatives during the 113th United States Congress.

== Background ==
There are existing exascale computer research programs in both China and Europe.

== Provisions of the bill ==
This summary is based largely on the summary provided by the Congressional Research Service, a public domain source.

The American Super Computing Leadership Act would amend the Department of Energy High-End Computing Revitalization Act of 2004 with respect to: (1) exascale computing (computing system performance at or near 10 to the 18th power floating point operations per second); and (2) a high-end computing system with performance substantially exceeding that of systems commonly available for advanced scientific and engineering applications.

The bill would direct the United States Secretary of Energy (DOE) to: (1) coordinate the development of high-end computing systems across DOE; (2) partner with universities, National Laboratories, and industry to ensure the broadest possible application of the technology developed in the program to other challenges in science, engineering, medicine, and industry; and (3) include among the multiple architectures researched, at DOE discretion, any computer technologies that show promise of substantial reductions in power requirements and substantial gains in parallelism of multicore processors, concurrency, memory and storage, bandwidth, and reliability.

The bill would repeal authority for establishment of at least one High-End Software Development Center.

The bill would direct the Secretary to conduct a coordinated research program to develop exascale computing systems to advance DOE missions. Requires establishment through competitive merit review of two or more DOE National Laboratory-industry-university partnerships to conduct integrated research, development, and engineering of multiple exascale architectures.

The bill would require the Secretary to conduct mission-related co-design activities in developing such exascale platforms. Defines "co-design" as the joint development of application algorithms, models, and codes with computer technology architectures and operating systems to maximize effective use of high-end computing systems.

The bill would direct the Secretary to develop any advancements in hardware and software technology required to realize fully the potential of an exascale production system in addressing DOE target applications and solving scientific problems involving predictive modeling and simulation and large-scale data analytics and management. Requires DOE also to explore the use of exascale computing technologies to advance a broad range of science and engineering.

The bill would direct the Secretary to submit to Congress an integrated strategy and program management plan.

The bill would require the Secretary, before initiating construction or installation of an exascale-class computing facility, to transmit to Congress a separate plan detailing: (1) the proposed facility's cost projections and capabilities to significantly accelerate the development of new energy technologies; (2) technical risks and challenges that must be overcome to achieve successful completion and operation of the facility; and (3) an independent assessment of the scientific and technological advances expected from such a facility relative to those expected from a comparable investment in expanded research and applications at terascale-class and petascale-class computing facilities, including an evaluation of where investments should be made in the system software and algorithms to enable these advances.

== Procedural history ==
The American Super Computing Leadership Act was introduced into the United States House of Representatives on June 25, 2013 by Rep. Randy Hultgren (R, IL-14). It was referred to the United States House Committee on Science, Space and Technology and the United States House Science Subcommittee on Energy. The bill was scheduled to be voted on under a suspension of the rules on September 8, 2014.

== Debate and discussion ==
Rep. Hultgren was inspired by a new 33.89-pentaflop computer, the Tianhe-2, that was announced in China. Hultgren said that "it's important not to lose sight that the reality was that it was built by China's National University of Defense Technology."

The chair of the Department of Cognitive Sciences at Rensselaer Polytechnic Institute, Selmer Bringsford, said that the United States falling behind in this field would be "devastating" because "if we were to lose our capacity to build preeminently smart machines, that would be a very dark situation, because machines can serve as weapons." Another consequence to the United States falling behind could be a brain drain of the best scientists and engineers in the field to other countries that are doing more advanced work.

Rick Stevens testified in support of the bill during a May 22, 2013 hearing. Stevens is the Associate Laboratory Director responsible for Computing, Environment, and Life Sciences research at Argonne National Laboratory. He called high-performance computing "vital to our national interest" arguing that it is "needed by all branches of science and engineering" and is used "by U.S. industry to maintain a competitive edge in the development of new products and services."

Aline D. McNaull or the American Institute of Physics reported that members of the United States House Science Subcommittee on Energy "demonstrated bi-partisan enthusiasm for advanced computing technology" during a May 22, 2013 hearing.
