= Lauren Underwood =

American politician (born 1986)

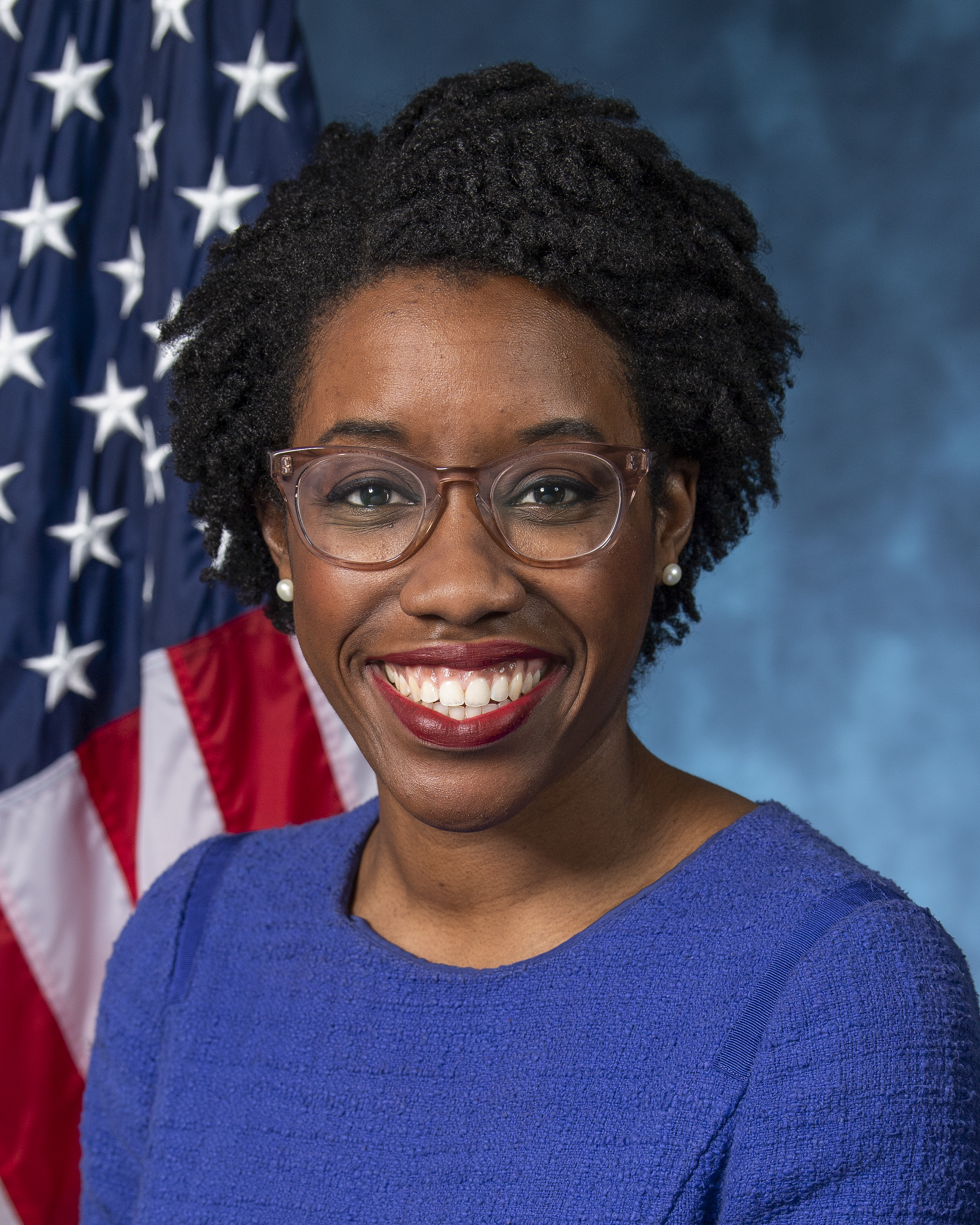
- Official portrait, 2018

Vice Chair-designate of the House Democratic Caucus
- Assuming office January 3, 2027
- Leader: Hakeem Jeffries
- Succeeding: Ted Lieu

Co-Chair of the House Democratic Policy and Communications Committee
- Incumbent
- Assumed office January 3, 2023 Serving with Lori Trahan and Maxwell Frost
- Leader: Hakeem Jeffries
- Preceded by: Matt Cartwright; Debbie Dingell; Joe Neguse

Member of the U.S. House of Representatives from Illinois's 14th district
- Incumbent
- Assumed office January 3, 2019
- Preceded by: Randy Hultgren

Personal details
- Born: Lauren Ashley Underwood; October 4, 1986 (age 40) Mayfield Heights, Ohio, U.S.
- Party: Democratic
- Education: University of Michigan (BSN); Johns Hopkins University (MSN, MPH)
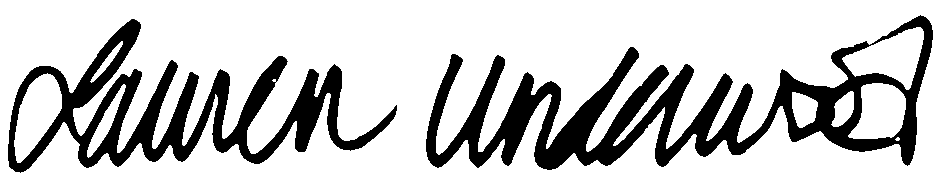
- Signature
- Website: House website Campaign website
- Underwood's voice Underwood on objections to 2020 election results. Recorded May 19, 2021

Lauren Ashley Underwood (born October 4, 1986) is an American politician and registered nurse who is a U.S. representative from Illinois's 14th congressional district as a member of the Democratic Party. Her district, once represented by former House speaker Dennis Hastert, includes the outer western suburbs of Chicago, including DeKalb, Joliet, Oswego, Ottawa, and Yorkville.

Underwood grew up in Naperville, Illinois. She graduated with a degree in nursing from the University of Michigan and two master's degrees from Johns Hopkins University. She began her career as a policy professional in the Obama administration in 2014, later working as a senior advisor at the Department of Health and Human Services (HHS).

In 2018, Underwood was elected to the United States House of Representatives, defeating Republican incumbent Randy Hultgren. Upon her swearing in, she became the youngest Black woman to serve in Congress. In 2022, she was elected a co-chair of the House Democratic Policy and Communications Committee, making her the first black woman to have an elected Democratic leadership position since Shirley Chisholm in the 1970s. In 2026, she beat Sara Jacobs in a race to become vice chair of the House Democratic Caucus. She has been reelected in 2020, 2022, 2024, and 2026.

== Early life ==
Underwood, who is of African American heritage, was born on October 4, 1986, in Mayfield Heights, Ohio. At age 3, she moved with her family to Naperville, Illinois, where she grew up and attended Neuqua Valley High School, graduating in 2004. She began as a Girl Scout in kindergarten and is a lifetime member. At eight years old, Underwood was diagnosed with supraventricular tachycardia, a pre-existing condition that later shaped her views on health policy.

From 2003 to 2004, she worked on the City of Naperville's Fair Housing Advisory Commission. She earned her Bachelor of Science in Nursing from the University of Michigan in 2008. At Michigan, Underwood took a course on nursing politics that she has said "changed her life" and influenced her to enter healthcare policy. Also at Michigan, she joined the National Pan-Hellenic Council sorority Alpha Kappa Alpha. She received her Master of Science in Nursing and Master of Public Health from Johns Hopkins University in 2009.

== Career ==
In 2014, Underwood became a senior advisor at the United States Department of Health and Human Services (HHS), where she worked to implement the Patient Protection and Affordable Care Act.

Beginning in 2017, Underwood was the senior director of strategy and regulatory affairs at Next Level Health. She also served as an adjunct instructor at the Georgetown University School of Nursing & Health Studies.

== U.S. House of Representatives ==
=== Elections ===
==== 2018 ====
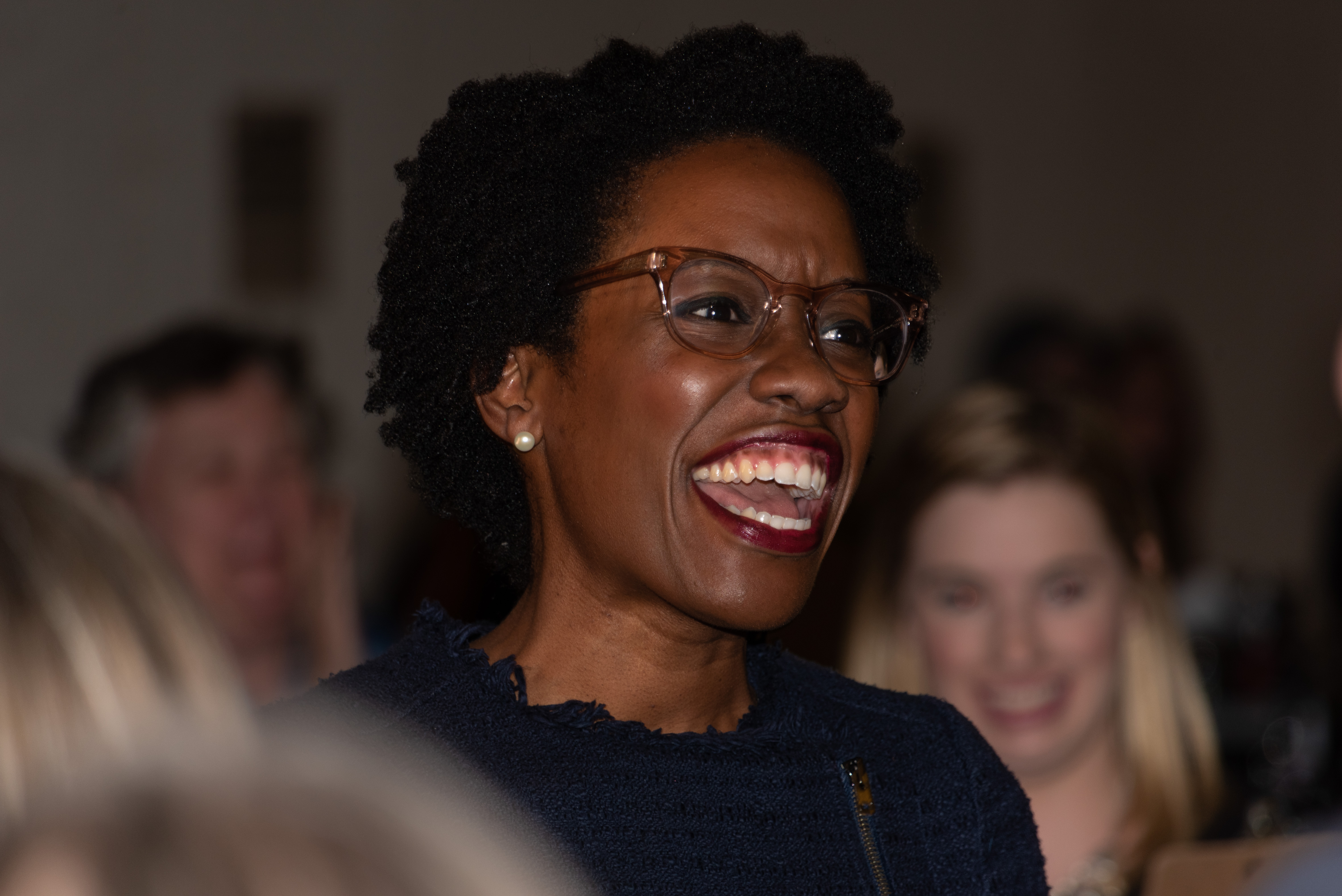
Underwood on election night 2018

In August 2017, Underwood announced her candidacy for the United States House of Representatives in Illinois's 14th congressional district. Her platform focused on improving the Affordable Care Act, expanding job opportunities, infrastructure improvements, and paid family leave. She won the March 20 Democratic primary with 57% of the vote against 6 opponents.

In the general election, Underwood faced incumbent Republican Randy Hultgren. In a public debate, Underwood, who has a heart condition, said that she had decided to run for the seat because Hultgren voted to repeal the ACA. Hultgren voted in favor of the Republican American Health Care Act, which passed the House in 2017 but not the Senate and would have repealed and replaced the ACA.

Underwood said the repeal-and-replace bill would have taken away the right of "individuals like me with preexisting conditions to have affordable coverage" and that people like her would either be denied coverage or charged more. Hultgren said the bill would have protected such people because although it would have allowed states to charge people with preexisting conditions more, they would be eligible for subsidies.

Underwood said that healthcare is "a human right" and that single-payer/universal coverage/Medicare for All was "a great goal" but would have to wait until there are concrete answers to questions about costs. Hultgren ran TV ads stating that Underwood supports a single-payer plan.

Former president Barack Obama and vice president Joe Biden endorsed Underwood. In the November 6 election, she defeated Hultgren with 52.5% of the vote.

==== 2020 ====
Underwood was reelected over state senator Jim Oberweis, in the ninth-closest race of the House 2020 election cycle. Following early returns, Oberweis claimed victory prior to the official declaration as to the winner. Nine days following voting, on November 12, the Associated Press called the election for Underwood. Oberweis unsuccessfully challenged the result.

==== 2022 ====
Underwood ran for reelection in 2022 in the 14th district after its lines were dramatically adjusted following redistricting. She won the election with 54% of the vote.

==== 2024 ====
Underwood ran for reelection in 2024 in the 14th district against Republican Jim Marter. She won the election with 55% of the vote.

==== 2026 ====
Underwood was unopposed in the 2026 Democratic primary. In the November general election she faces Republican Jim Marter, the party's 2024 nominee, who won the Republican primary over Gary Vician. The Cook Political Report has rated the race as a Solid Democratic seat.

=== Tenure ===
Several of Underwood's bills were signed into law by President Trump during her first term as provisions of larger legislation. These included the Lower Insulin Costs Now Act, which allowed the Food and Drug Administration to continue reviewing pending applications for generic insulin products after a transition deadline had expired, a nursing workforce reauthorization act, which was folded into the CARES Act in March 2020, and two veterans' health bills: the Veterans in STEM Act and the Caring for Our Women Veterans Act, enacted in January 2021. By 2023, 14 pieces of her legislation had been signed into law under Trump and Biden. Her VA Office of Inspector General Training Act, which requires training for Department of Veterans Affairs employees on reporting fraud, waste, and abuse, was signed by Biden in January 2025. In 2019, Underwood was listed in the Time 100 Next where her entry was written by U.S. Senator Cory Booker.

At a Department of Homeland Security budget hearing in 2019, Underwood remarked on treatment of migrants in United States Border Patrol custody. She said "Congress has been more than willing to provide the resources and work with you to address the security and humanitarian concerns but at this point, with 5 kids that have died, 5,000 separated from their families – I feel like, and the evidence is really clear, that this is intentional." Underwood further said "It’s a policy choice being made on purpose by this administration, and it’s cruel and inhumane." The remarks caused controversy at the hearing, and were stricken from the record.

==== Leadership ====
In December 2022, Underwood was elected co-chair of the House Democratic Policy and Communications Committee (DPCC) for the 118th Congress, along with Veronica Escobar and Dean Phillips. She was reelected co-chair in November 2024 for the 119th Congress, serving under DPCC chair Debbie Dingell with co-chairs Lori Trahan and Maxwell Frost. In February 2025, Democratic Congressional Campaign Committee chair Suzan DelBene named Underwood one of the committee's three recruitment co-chairs for the 2026 election cycle, alongside Jason Crow and Morgan McGarvey.

==== Health care ====
A major focus for Underwood in Congress has been health care, including coverage affordability and disparities in maternal health outcomes. In 2019, she introduced the Health Care Affordability Act to expand eligibility for the premium tax credits that subsidize Affordable Care Act marketplace coverage, presenting it as an alternative to Medicare for All, which she declined to cosponsor. A version of the bill was enacted as part of the American Rescue Plan Act of 2021, and the enhanced credits were extended through 2025 by the Inflation Reduction Act of 2022. The enhanced credits expired at the end of 2025 after Congress did not renew them during the 2025 United States federal government shutdown. Underwood opposed the Senate agreement that ended the shutdown because it did not include an extension. On January 8, 2026, the House passed her bill to extend the credits for three years by a vote of 230 to 196, after a discharge petition signed by House Democrats and four Republicans forced a floor vote.

In April 2019, Underwood and Representative Alma Adams founded the Black Maternal Health Caucus, and in 2020 they introduced the Black Maternal Health Momnibus Act, a package of bills addressing maternal mortality and racial disparities in maternal health outcomes. The first of the bills to become law, the Protecting Moms Who Served Act, which directed the Department of Veterans Affairs to improve maternity care coordination for veterans and to study maternal mortality among veterans, was signed by President Biden on November 30, 2021. Underwood and Senator Cory Booker reintroduced the package as 14 separate bills in March 2026. In July 2026, the House unanimously passed her NIH IMPROVE Act, a “Momnibus” bill that Underwood introduced with Republican Brian Fitzpatrick that authorizes National Institutes of Health research on maternal mortality.

=== Committee assignments ===
For the 119th Congress:

- Committee on Appropriations
  - Subcommittee on Agriculture, Rural Development, Food and Drug Administration, and Related Agencies
  - Subcommittee on Financial Services and General Government
  - Subcommittee on Homeland Security (Ranking Member)

=== Caucus memberships ===
- Congressional Black Caucus
- Black Maternal Health Caucus
- Congressional Equality Caucus
- Future Forum

== Electoral history ==
Illinois 14th Congressional District Democratic Primary, 2018
Party	Candidate	Votes	%
Democratic	Lauren Underwood	29,391	57.35
Democratic	Matthew Brolley	6,845	13.36
Democratic	Jim Walz	5,100	9.95
Democratic	Victor Swanson	3,597	7.02
Democratic	John J. Hosta	2,578	5.03
Democratic	George Weber	2,570	5.01
Democratic	Daniel Roldan-Johnson	1,170	2.28
Total votes		51,251	100.0

Illinois 14th Congressional District General Election, 2018
Party	Candidate	Votes	%
Democratic	Lauren Underwood	156,035	52.50
Republican	Randy Hultgren (incumbent)	141,164	47.50
Total votes		297,199	100.0

Illinois 14th Congressional District Democratic Primary, 2020
Party	Candidate	Votes	%
Democratic	Lauren Underwood (incumbent)	77,707	100.0
Total votes		77,707	100.0

Illinois 14th Congressional District General Election, 2020
Party	Candidate	Votes	%
Democratic	Lauren Underwood (incumbent)	203,209	50.67
Republican	Jim Oberweis	197,835	49.33
Total votes		401,052	100.0

Illinois 14th Congressional District General Election, 2022
Party	Candidate	Votes	%
Democratic	Lauren Underwood (incumbent)	128,141	54.16
Republican	Scott Gryder	108,451	45.84
Write-in		8	0.00
Total votes		236,600	100.0

Illinois 14th Congressional District General Election, 2024
Party	Candidate	Votes	%
Democratic	Lauren Underwood (incumbent)	183,446	55.10
Republican	Jim Marter	149,464	44.89
Write-in		19	0.01
Total votes		332,929	100.0

== See also ==
- List of African-American United States representatives
- Women in the United States House of Representatives

U.S. House of Representatives
Preceded by Randy Hultgren	Member of the U.S. House of Representatives from Illinois's 14th congressional district 2019–present	Incumbent
U.S. order of precedence (ceremonial)
Preceded by Lori Trahan	United States representatives by seniority 233rd	Succeeded by Jeff Van Drew
