= 2026 Illinois gubernatorial election =

- November 3, 2026

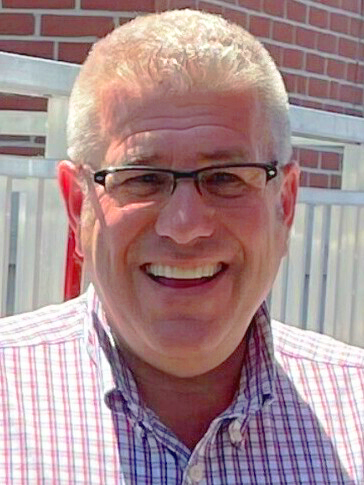
Nominee	JB Pritzker	Darren Bailey
Party	Democratic	Republican
Running mate	Christian Mitchell	Aaron Del Mar
Popular vote	2,574,606	1,516,219
Percentage	60.82%	35.82%
- Pritzker: 50–60% 60–70% 70–80% Bailey: 50–60% 60–70% 70–80% 80–90%
Governor before election
JB Pritzker
Democratic
Elected Governor
JB Pritzker
Democratic

The 2026 Illinois gubernatorial election was held on November 3, 2026, to elect the governor of Illinois. Democratic incumbent JB Pritzker sought a third term in office against Republican nominee Darren Bailey, whom he defeated in 2022. Pritzker defeated Bailey a second time, becoming the first Illinois governor to be reelected to a third term since Jim Thompson in 1982, and the first Democrat to do so in the state's history. Pritzker outperformed his 2022 margin of victory by double digits.

Primary elections were held on March 17, 2026. Pritzker secured the Democratic nomination unopposed, while Darren Bailey secured the Republican nomination with 54% of the vote. Pritzker selected Christian Mitchell as his running mate, as incumbent lieutenant governor Juliana Stratton ran as the Democratic nominee for U.S. Senate.

The election was the first gubernatorial rematch in Illinois since 1986. In the general election, Pritzker won with approximately 60% of the vote, an improvement of five percentage points from 2022. This is the first time a Democratic candidate for governor has won 60% or more of the vote in Illinois, as well as the first time Sangamon County went for the Democratic candidate for governor since 1964, and the first time for McHenry County since 1852.

== Background ==
A moderately to strongly Democratic state, Illinois has a reputation for being both the most populous and the most left-leaning state in the Midwest, largely due to the progressive and diverse Chicago metropolitan area. While the state favored Republicans for governor during the 1970s to 1990s, Democrats have won all but one gubernatorial race in Illinois since 2002, the exception being Bruce Rauner's narrow victory in 2014. In addition, Democrats have occupied all of its statewide offices since 2019 and have won by double-digit margins in every presidential election since 1992.

Incumbent governor JB Pritzker, a member of the Democratic Party, comfortably won the previous two elections, having first been elected with a 15.6% lead in 2018 and won re-election by 12.5% in 2022. Despite the state's strong Democratic lean, Republicans are comfortably favored in most of rural Illinois, especially in much of West Central and Southern Illinois. Illinois is one of 16 states that do not have gubernatorial term limits.

== Democratic primary ==
=== Candidates ===
==== Nominee ====
- JB Pritzker, incumbent governor (2019–present)
  - Running mate: Christian Mitchell, former deputy governor (2019–2023) and former state representative (2013–2019)

==== Disqualified ====
- Patricia Tillman, former candidate for Chicago City Council
  - Running mate: Joseph Mosley

=== Endorsements ===
JB Pritzker

Labor unions

- Illinois AFL-CIO
- International Union of Operating Engineers Locals 150 and 399
- SEIU Healthcare
- SEIU Illinois State Council

Organizations

- Cook County Democratic Party
- Equality Illinois
- New Trier Democrats

Newspapers

- The Chicago Crusader

=== Results ===
Democratic primary results
Party	Candidate	Votes	%
Democratic	JB Pritzker (incumbent); Christian Mitchell	1,197,587	100.0
Total votes		1,197,587	100.0

== Republican primary ==
=== Candidates ===
==== Nominee ====
- Darren Bailey, former state senator from the 55th district (2021–2023), nominee for governor in 2022, and candidate for Illinois's 12th congressional district in 2024
  - Running mate: Aaron Del Mar, Palatine Township Highway Commissioner, chair of the Cook County Republican Party, and candidate for lieutenant governor in 2022

==== Eliminated in primary ====
- Ted Dabrowski, conservative news website president
  - Running mate: Carrie Mendoza, leader of FAIR In Medicine
- Rick Heidner, real estate developer
  - Running mate: Christina Neitzke-Troike, mayor of Homer Glen
- James Mendrick, DuPage County Sheriff (2018–present)
  - Running mate: Robert Renteria, author and businessman

==== Withdrawn ====
- Phil Perez, member of the Posen Park District Commission
- Max Solomon, attorney and candidate for governor in 2022 (running a write-in campaign for State Treasurer)
  - Running mate: Geno Young, musician and candidate for Illinois's 1st congressional district in 2022

==== Disqualified ====
- Joseph Severino, capital management professional, nominee for Illinois's 10th congressional district in 2022 and independent candidate in 2024
  - Running mate: Rantch Isquith, bank examiner

==== Declined ====
- Scott Gartner, mayor of Antioch (2021–present)
- Jeanne Ives, former state representative from the 42nd district (2013–2019), candidate for governor in 2018, and nominee for Illinois's 6th congressional district in 2020 (endorsed Dabrowski)
- Darin LaHood, U.S. representative from Illinois's 16th congressional district (2015–present) (running for re-election)
- Dan Ugaste, state representative from the 65th district (2019–present) (running for re-election)

=== Endorsements ===
Darren Bailey

Newspapers

- Daily Herald
Ted Dabrowski

State legislators

- Jeanne Ives, former HD-42 (2013–2019)
- Tom Morrison, former HD-54 (2011–2023)

Local officials

- Bob Grogan, former DuPage County auditor (2008–2020)
James Mendrick

Local officials

- 3 county sheriffs
Declined to endorse

Newspapers

- Chicago Tribune

=== Polling ===
Poll source	Date(s) administered	Sample size (Note: Key: A – all adults RV – registered voters LV – likely voters V – unclear)	Margin of error	Darren Bailey	Ted Dabrowski	Rick Heidner	James Mendrick	Other	Undecided
Osage Research (R) (Note: Poll sponsored by Bailey's campaign)	January 20–23, 2026	412 (LV)	± 5.7%	57%	8%	9%	4%	–	22%
Emerson College/WGN-TV	January 3–5, 2026	432 (LV)	± 4.7%	34%	8%	1%	5%	4% (Note: Gregg Moore and Joseph Severino with 2%)	46%

=== Results ===
Results by county Bailey: 30–40%; 40–50%; 50–60%; 60–70%; 70–80%; 80–90%; 90–100%; Dabrowski: 30–40%; 40–50%

Republican primary results
Party	Candidate	Votes	%
Republican	Darren Bailey; Aaron Del Mar	304,162	53.3
Republican	Ted Dabrowski; Carrie Mendoza	165,229	28.9
Republican	James Mendrick; Robert Renteria	54,599	9.6
Republican	Rick Heidner; Christina Neitzke-Troike	46,374	8.1
Total votes		570,364	100.0

== Third-party and independent candidates ==
=== Declared ===
==== Independents ====
- Collin Corbett, former Republican campaign strategist
  - Running mate: Carolyn Schofield, Republican candidate for lieutenant governor in 2022

=== Illinois Solidarity Party ===
==== Declared Write-In ====
- Michael Vick, podcaster and pro-life activist
  - Running mate: Gary Pierce, minister

== General election ==
=== Predictions ===
Source	Ranking	As of
The Cook Political Report	Solid D	October 29, 2026
Decision Desk HQ	Safe D	November 3, 2026
Fox News	Solid D	November 1, 2026
Inside Elections	Solid D	October 29, 2026
NBC News	Solid D	November 3, 2026
RealClearPolitics	Solid D	November 1, 2026
Sabato's Crystal Ball	Safe D	November 2, 2026
Silver Bulletin	Solid D	November 3, 2026

=== Post-primary endorsements ===
JB Pritzker (D)

State legislators

- Jim Durkin, former minority leader of the Illinois House of Representatives (2013–2023) from HD-82 (2006–2023) (Republican)

Organizations

- End Citizens United
- Giffords
- Human Rights Campaign
Darren Bailey (R)

Executive branch officials

- Donald Trump, president of the United States (2017–2021, 2025–present)

=== Polling ===
Poll source	Date(s) administered	Sample size	Margin of error	JB Pritzker (D)	Darren Bailey (R)	Other	Undecided	Difference Between Pritzker and Bailey
Research Co.	October 31 – November 2, 2026	450 (LV)	± 4.6%	57%	36%	1% (Note: "Some other candidate" with 1%)	6%	+21
ActiVote	October 23–31, 2026	400 (LV)	± 4.9%	59%	41%	–	–	+18
University of Illinois Springfield	October 1–22, 2026	550 (LV)	± 4.5%	56%	34%	8%	2%	+22
ActiVote	October 2–22, 2026	400 (LV)	± 4.9%	59%	41%	–	–	+18
Public Policy Polling (D) (Note: Poll conducted for Chicago News Weekly)	September 30 – October 1, 2026	569 (LV)	—	54%	34%	6% (Note: Collin Corbett (I) with 6%)	6%	+20
Victory Research	November 20–24, 2025	1,208 (LV)	± 2.8%	54%	34%	—	12%	+20

=== Results ===
2026 Illinois gubernatorial election
Party	Candidate	Votes	%	±%
Democratic	JB Pritzker (incumbent); Christian Mitchell	2,574,606	60.82	+5.2
Republican	Darren Bailey; Aaron Del Mar	1,516,219	35.82	−5.8
Independent	Collin Corbett; Carolyn Schofield	142,368	3.36	N/A
Total votes		4,190,958	100.0	
Democratic hold				

Counties that flipped from Republican to Democratic:

- Jackson (largest city: Carbondale)
- McHenry (largest city: Crystal Lake)
- Sangamon (largest city: Springfield)
- Winnebago (largest city: Rockford)

== See also ==
- 2026 United States elections
- 2026 Illinois elections
- 2026 United States Senate election in Illinois
- 2026 United States House of Representatives elections in Illinois

== Notes ==
Partisan clients
