= 2026 Illinois elections =

- November 3, 2026

A general election was held in the U.S. state of Illinois on November 3, 2026. The elections for United States Senate and United States House of Representatives, Governor, statewide constitutional officers, Illinois Senate, and Illinois House will all be held on that date. Primary elections took place on March 17, 2026.

== Election information ==
2026 is a midterm election year in the United States.

== Federal elections ==
=== United States Senate ===
The incumbent senator of Illinois' class 2 United States Senate seat is Democrat Dick Durbin, who has served five consecutive terms. Durbin announced his retirement in April 2025, making this the first open race for this seat since 1996.

=== United States House of Representatives ===
All of Illinois's seats in the United States House of Representatives were for election in 2026.

== State elections ==
=== Governor and lieutenant governor ===
The incumbent governor and lieutenant governor are Democrats JB Pritzker and Juliana Stratton. Pritzker is running for reelection, while Stratton is running for the U.S. Senate, with Christian Mitchell replacing her on the ticket with Pritzker.

=== Attorney general ===
The incumbent attorney general is two-term Democrat Kwame Raoul, who is running for re-election.

=== Secretary of state ===
The incumbent secretary of state is one-term Democrat Alexi Giannoulias, who is running for re-election.

=== Comptroller ===
The incumbent comptroller is Susana Mendoza, who is retiring from the office after two-and-a-half terms.

=== Treasurer ===
The incumbent treasurer is three-term Democrat Mike Frerichs, who is running for re-election.

=== State senate ===
Two-thirds of the seats of the Illinois Senate are up for election in 2026.

=== State House of Representatives ===
All of the seats in the Illinois House of Representatives are up for election in 2026.

== Judicial elections ==
Judicial elections will be held, consisting of both partisan and retention elections.

== Local elections ==
Local elections took place in several jurisdictions, including county elections such as the Cook County elections.
