= David Reis =

American politician

Member of the Illinois House of Representatives from the 109th district
- In office 2005–2019
- Preceded by: William J. Grunloh
- Succeeded by: Darren Bailey

Personal details
- Born: September 15, 1964 (age 61) Olney, Illinois, U.S.
- Party: Republican
- Spouse: Maria
- Occupation: Farmer

David B. Reis (born September 15, 1964) was a Republican member of the Illinois House of Representatives, representing the 108th district from 2005 to 2012 and the 109th District from 2013 to 2019.

== Early life ==
David B. Reis was born September 15, 1964. Reis has an associate degree in agricultural sciences from Lake Land College and a Bachelor of Science in agriculture from the University of Illinois College of Agriculture. After working in Chicago as an executive recruiter, he returned to the farm after his father's death in 1990. He served on the board of directors of the Illinois Pork Producers Association from 1997 to 2004. Reis grew up and continues to live on his family's fifth-generation family farm near Ste. Marie, Illinois.

== Political career ==
In the 2002 general election, Reis ran a strong campaign against Democratic incumbent Charles A. Hartke. In the 2004 general election, Reis was the Republican candidate against Hartke's successor, William J. Grunloh. Reis won 62%-38%.

During the 2008 Republican Party presidential primaries, Reis worked on behalf of the presidential campaign of former U.S. Senator Fred Thompson as a member of the Illinois statewide steering committee and as a congressional district chair for Illinois's 19th congressional district.

Reis was one of only five Illinois representatives to vote against the Illinois Right to Vote Amendment on its passage in the Illinois House of Representatives. The bill subsequently was passed unanimously in the Illinois Senate, and was approved as a constitutional amendment by the voters of Illinois.

Reis ran for re-election in 2018, but was defeated by Darren Bailey in the Republican primary. Many attributed his defeat because of his vote in favor of overriding Governor Bruce Rauner's veto of a tax increase that had passed the Illinois General Assembly.
