= Darren Bailey =

American politician (born 1966)

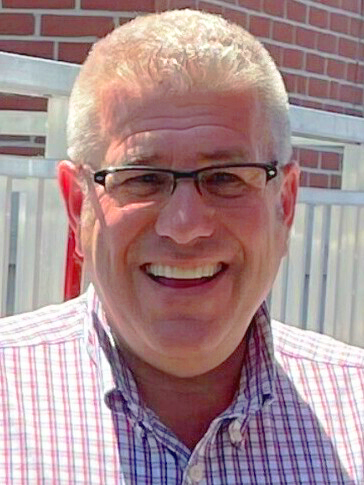
- Bailey in 2022

Member of the Illinois Senate from the 55th district
- In office January 13, 2021 – January 11, 2023
- Preceded by: Dale Righter
- Succeeded by: Jason Plummer (redistricted)

Member of the Illinois House of Representatives from the 109th district
- In office January 9, 2019 – January 13, 2021
- Preceded by: David Reis
- Succeeded by: Adam Niemerg

Personal details
- Born: March 17, 1966 (age 60) Louisville, Illinois, U.S.
- Party: Republican
- Spouse: Cindy Stortzum
- Children: 4
- Education: Lake Land College (AS)
- Website: Campaign website

Darren Bailey (born March 17, 1966) is an American politician who was a Republican member of the Illinois Senate for the 55th District and previously a member of the Illinois House of Representatives for the 109th District in Southern Illinois. Widely described by news outlets as a far-right politician, he was the Republican nominee for the 2022 Illinois gubernatorial election and the 2026 Illinois gubernatorial election, losing both times to Democrat JB Pritzker.

Bailey ran in the Republican primary for the 12th congressional district in the 2024 U.S. House elections, losing to incumbent Mike Bost.

== Early life and education ==
Bailey was born in Louisville, Illinois, on March 17, 1966. He graduated from North Clay High School and earned an Associate of Science degree in agricultural production from Lake Land College.

== Political career ==
Bailey, of Xenia, Illinois, was a member of the North Clay Board of Education.

In a rare victory for candidates supported by Dan Proft's Liberty Principles PAC, Bailey defeated David Reis in the 2018 Republican primary. Bailey then defeated Democratic candidate Cynthia Given, the Secretary of the Richland County Democratic Party, by a margin of 76.14% to 23.86%. The 109th District at the time, located in the Illinois Wabash Valley, included all of Edwards, Jasper, Richland, Wabash, Wayne, and White counties and parts of Effingham and Lawrence counties.

On July 8, 2019, Bailey announced his intention to run for the Illinois Senate seat being vacated by Dale Righter. He won the March 17, 2020, Republican primary. Bailey defeated Democratic nominee Cynthia Given in the general election.

In April 2020, Bailey sued Governor JB Pritzker, claiming that the governor's stay-at-home order extension to mitigate effects of the COVID-19 pandemic was unfairly affecting residents of Clay County. A judge granted a temporary restraining order against the stay-at-home order, though it only applied to Bailey. Pritzker stated he would appeal the order and characterized Bailey's lawsuit as a "cheap political stunt". On May 20, 2020, the Illinois House voted 81–27 to remove Bailey from its session for refusing to wear a mask. The following day, Bailey attended the House wearing a face mask as required by the rules.

On February 22, 2021, Bailey announced his candidacy for governor in 2022. On December 13, 2021, Bailey announced that his running mate for lieutenant governor would be former WLS-AM 890 talk radio host Stephanie Trussell. Three days before the primary, Bailey appeared at a rally with Donald Trump and received his endorsement.

Bailey won the primary by a large margin, receiving 57.7% of the vote and winning all but two counties.

Before a campaign appearance on July 4, 2022, in the wake of the Highland Park Parade Shooting, Bailey stated on a livestream "The shooter is still at large, so let's pray for justice to prevail, and then let's move on and let's celebrate - celebrate the independence of this nation". He received backlash for his statement and later apologized. For his gubernatorial campaign, Bailey received more than $50M in support from businessman Dick Uihlein.

Bailey ended up losing to incumbent J.B. Pritzker by a margin of 12.5 percentage points. Despite his loss, Bailey improved upon Bruce Rauner's 2018 performance by around 4% and flipped four counties that Pritzker had won in 2018. Bailey also outperformed his polling aggregate by 3.7%.

In the state Senate, Bailey served on the following committees: Agriculture (Minority Spokesperson); Education; Energy and Public Utilities; Health; Higher Education; Labor; Subcommittee on Public Health; App- Agriculture, Envir. & Energy; App- Higher Education; App-Human Services; App- Personnel and Procurement; Redistricting- E Central & SE IL.

In 2023, Bailey announced that he would run against incumbent U.S. Representative Mike Bost in the Republican primary for the 12th congressional district in 2024. On March 19, 2024, Bailey lost the primary to Bost.

In September 2025, Bailey announced his intent to seek the Republican nomination in the 2026 Illinois gubernatorial election. He ended up comfortably winning the primary in March 2026, with Cook County Chairman Aaron del Mar as his running mate. Bailey lost the 2026 gubernatorial election by double the margin of his previous loss in 2022, ultimately losing by 25 percentage points and receiving over a million less votes than Pritzker.

== Political positions ==
Bailey holds far-right political views. He opposes abortion, and as a state lawmaker, he has voted against abortion rights measures. He praised the Supreme Court's 2022 decision to overturn Roe v. Wade. He supports a statewide ban on abortion except in cases where the mother's life is in danger, opposing abortion in cases of rape or incest. In a video posted on Facebook in 2017, Bailey said "the attempted extermination of the Jews of World War II doesn't even compare on a shadow of the life that has been lost with abortion since its legalization".

Bailey strongly opposes the SAFE-T Act, a bill signed into law by Governor J. B. Pritzker that, among other things, ended mandatory cash bail in Illinois. Bailey has referred to the act as "radical, pro-criminal legislation".

In 2019, Bailey and seven other Republicans sponsored a resolution calling for the City of Chicago to become its own state, claiming that "the majority of residents in downstate Illinois disagree with City of Chicago residents on key issues such as gun ownership, abortion, immigration, and other policy issues." This was not the first time such a resolution was introduced, but it had little chance of passing, and some of the sponsors stated they did not actually intend to separate Chicago. With the announcement of Bailey's bid for governor, Bailey backtracked, calling it "an old resolution" and "a warning shot" targeted towards Chicago.

Following the 2020 presidential election, Bailey refused to acknowledge that Joe Biden fairly defeated Donald Trump, stating that he "did not know" if Trump's disproven claims of voter fraud were legitimate.

== Electoral history ==
Illinois 109th State House District Republican Primary, 2018
Party	Candidate	Votes	%
Republican	Darren Bailey	9,729	56.76
Republican	David B. Reis (incumbent)	7,411	43.24
Total votes		17,140	100.0

Illinois 109th State House District General Election, 2018
Party	Candidate	Votes	%
Republican	Darren Bailey	30,048	76.14
Democratic	Cynthia Given	9,417	23.86
Total votes		39,465	100.0

Illinois 55th State Senate District Republican Primary, 2020
Party	Candidate	Votes	%
Republican	Darren Bailey	24,572	77.04
Republican	Jeffrey E. (Jeff) Fleming	7,324	22.96
Total votes		31,896	100.0

Illinois 55th State Senate District General Election, 2020
Party	Candidate	Votes	%
Republican	Darren Bailey	78,010	76.68
Democratic	Cynthia Given	23,726	23.32
Total votes		101,736	100.0
Republican hold			

2022 Illinois gubernatorial election Republican primary results
Party	Candidate	Votes	%
Republican	Darren Bailey; Stephanie Trussell	454,068	57.7
Republican	Jesse Sullivan; Kathleen Murphy	123,156	15.6
Republican	Richard Irvin; Avery Bourne	117,276	14.9
Republican	Gary Rabine; Aaron Del Mar	51,611	6.6
Republican	Paul Schimpf; Carolyn Schofield	33,897	4.3
Republican	Max Solomon; Latasha H. Fields	7,199	0.9
Total votes		787,207	100.0

2022 Illinois gubernatorial election
Party	Candidate	Votes	%
Democratic	JB Pritzker (incumbent); Juliana Stratton (incumbent)	2,253,748	54.91
Republican	Darren Bailey; Stephanie Trussell	1,739,095	42.37
Libertarian	Scott Schluter; John Phillips	111,712	2.72
Write-in		81	0.0
Total votes		4,104,636	100.0
Democratic hold			

Illinois 12th Congressional District Republican Primary, 2024
Party	Candidate	Votes	%
Republican	Mike Bost (incumbent)	48,770	51.4
Republican	Darren Bailey	46,035	48.6
Total votes		94,805	100.0

== Personal life ==
Bailey is married to Cindy Stortzum, and they have four children and multiple grandchildren. He owns a family farm. Bailey and his wife run a private Christian school.

In 2022, a man was arrested for making violent threats against Bailey, claiming he was going to "skin [Bailey] alive".

In 2025, Bailey's son Zachary, his daughter-in-law Kelsey, and two of their three children, Vada Rose and Samuel, were killed in a helicopter crash in Montana.

Party political offices
Preceded by Bruce Rauner	Republican nominee for Governor of Illinois; 2022, 2026	Most recent
