= William J. Grunloh =

American politician (born 1956)

William J. Grunloh (May 1, 1956) is a former Democratic member of the Illinois House of Representatives, in which he served from May 2003 until January 2005.

== Biography ==
Grunloh was born May 1, 1956, in Effingham County, Illinois. He was educated at St. Anthony's High School in Effingham, Illinois, and pursued a career as a building contractor. He was elected to the Effingham County Board. On May 5, 2003, he was appointed to the Illinois House of Representatives to replace Charles A. Hartke, who was appointed the Director of the Illinois Department of Agriculture. He served on the following committees; Committees on Agriculture & Conservation; Appropriations-Elementary & Secondary Education; Commerce & Business Development; Local Government; Veterans' Affairs. During his tenure, Grunloh worked out a deal in which private and religious schools could receive state accreditation. He introduced legislation to allow employers to opt out of providing coverage for contraception and sponsored a state constitutional amendment to ban same-sex marriage. In the 2004 election, he faced farmer David Reis. Grunloh was endorsed by the Illinois Farm Bureau, Illinois Federation for Right to Life, Illinois State Rifle Association, various labor unions and A.B.A.T.E., an organization against compulsory motorcycle helmet laws. Despite Grunloh's conservative record, the Republican tilt of the district was too much to overcome and Grunloh lost 62%-38%.

On January 10, 2021, Secretary Omar Osman reappointed Grunloh to serve as the Chief Procurement Officer for the Illinois Department of Transportation for a term ending June 30, 2025.

Preceded by Charles A. Hartke	Member of the Illinois House of Representatives from the 108th district May 2003 – January 2005	Succeeded by David Reis
