= Dale Righter =

American politician

Member of the Illinois Senate from the 55th district
- In office January 8, 2003 – January 13, 2021
- Preceded by: Frank Watson (redistricted)
- Succeeded by: Darren Bailey

Member of the Illinois House of Representatives from the 106th District
- In office November 1997 – January 8, 2003
- Preceded by: Mike Weaver
- Succeeded by: Keith P. Sommer (renumbered)

Personal details
- Born: August 23, 1966 (age 60) Mattoon, Illinois, U.S.
- Party: Republican
- Children: 2
- Education: Saint Louis University (J.D.); Eastern Illinois University (B.S.)
- Profession: Attorney

Dale Righter (born August 23, 1966) is an American politician and former Republican member of the Illinois Senate, representing the 55th district from 2003 to 2021. The 55th district included Clay, Clark, Coles, Crawford, Cumberland, Edwards, Effingham, Jasper, Lawrence, Richland, Wabash, Wayne and White counties in the southeastern corner of the state. He was previously a member of the Illinois House of Representatives from 1997 through 2003.

Righter now is the owner and operator of the Law Offices of Dale A. Righter, LLC in his hometown of Mattoon.

== Early life, education and career ==
Righter was born and raised in Mattoon, Illinois. He attended Mattoon High School and in 1988 graduated from Eastern Illinois University with a Bachelor of Science in accounting. In 1991, Righter earned his J.D. degree from the Saint Louis University School of Law. After law school, he took a job as a drug crimes prosecutor with the State's Attorney's Appellate Prosecutor's Office.

== Illinois General Assembly ==
In September 1997, Righter was appointed to represent the 106th district in the Illinois House of Representatives after Mike Weaver resigned to accept an appointment to the Illinois Industrial Commission (since renamed the Illinois Workers' Compensation Commission). In 2001, he announced he was running for state senate in the newly redistricted 55th district which included Lawrence, Crawford, Clark, Cumberland, Edgar, Coles, Douglas and Piatt counties as well as parts of Champaign, Effingham, Shelby and Wabash counties. In 2020, Righter opted not to run for reelection and was succeeded by Darren Bailey.

Righter criticized House member Darren Bailey for not wearing a face mask on the floor of the Illinois House, despite the requirement due to the COVID-19 pandemic. Righter later said in an interview “I would not have done that”, and “I choose to wear the mask because I choose to put others concerns, quite frankly, before me”.

During the 2008 Republican Party presidential primaries, Righter ran to be a delegate to the 2008 Republican National Convention from Illinois's 15th congressional district for the presidential campaign of former Governor Mitt Romney.
