= Christian Mitchell =

American politician

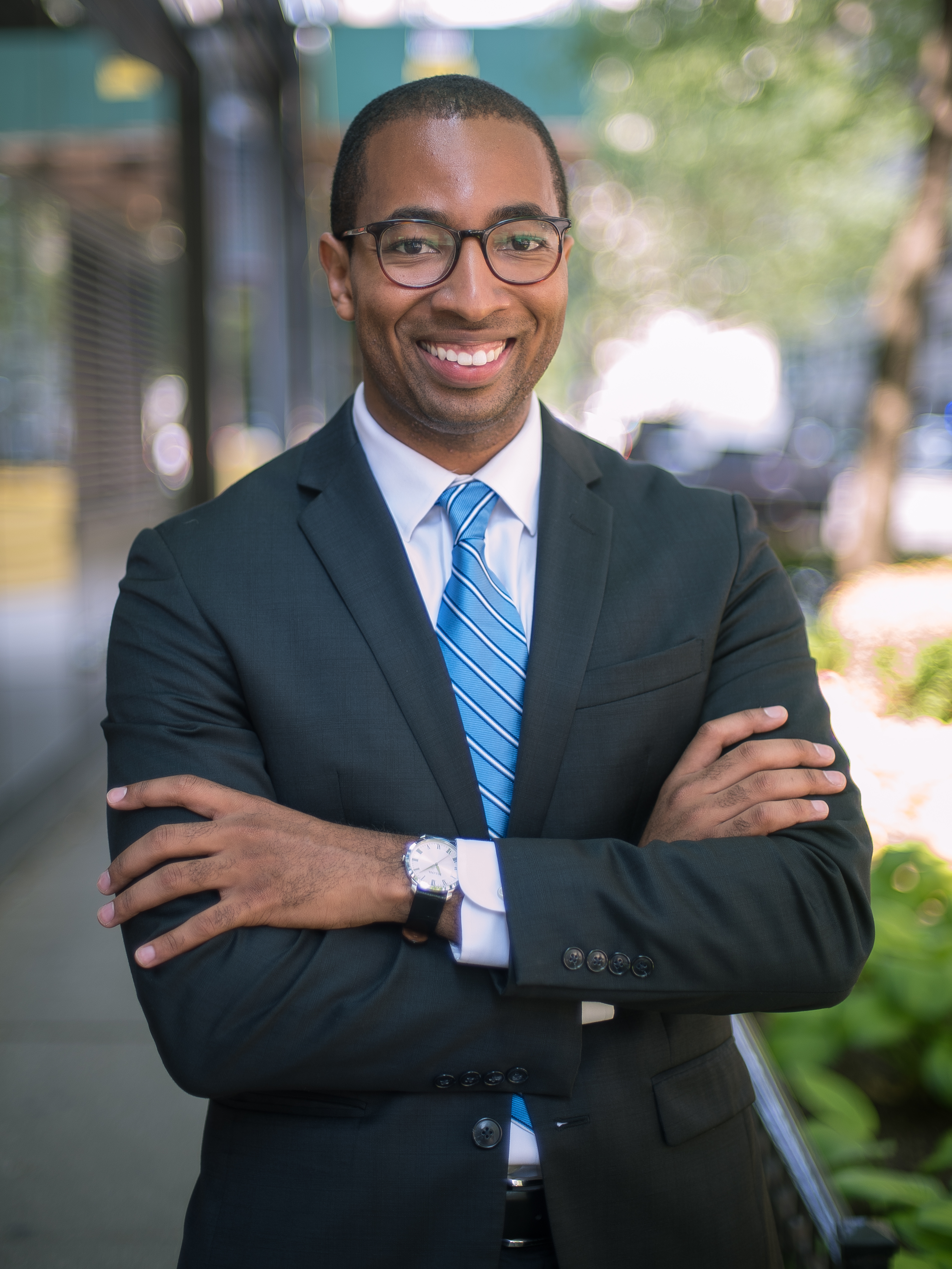
- Mitchell in 2018

Lieutenant Governor-elect of Illinois
- Assuming office January 11, 2027
- Governor: JB Pritzker
- Succeeding: Juliana Stratton

Member of the Illinois House of Representatives from the 26th district
- In office January 2013 – January 18, 2019
- Preceded by: Kimberly du Buclet
- Succeeded by: Kam Buckner

Personal details
- Born: 1986 or 1987 (age 39–40) Chicago, Illinois, U.S.
- Party: Democratic
- Education: University of Chicago (BA); Loyola University Chicago (JD)

Military service
- Allegiance: United States
- Branch: United States Air Force
- Rank: Captain
- Unit: Illinois Air National Guard

Christian L. Mitchell (born 1986 or 1987) is an American politician and university official who is the lieutenant governor-elect of Illinois, taking office in 2027. He represented the 26th district in the Illinois House of Representatives from 2013 to 2019, and served as Deputy Governor in J.B. Pritzker's administration from 2019 to 2023. He also served as the executive director of the Democratic Party of Illinois during the 2018 election cycle, becoming the first African-American to hold the position. In 2023, he became the Vice President for Civic Engagement at the University of Chicago.

On July 1, 2025, Governor Pritzker announced that Mitchell would be his running mate in the 2026 election after incumbent Lieutenant Governor Juliana Stratton announced she would instead run for US Senate.

== Background, education, and early career ==
Mitchell was raised by his mother, a retired nurse, and his grandfather, who was a union steelworker and an elder at his church in Maywood. Mitchell cites his mother's dedication and sacrifice, as well as his grandfather's service, as his inspiration for becoming a public servant.

Mitchell attended the University of Chicago, graduating in 2008 with a BA in public policy. While a student, he was a member of the university's Organization of Black Students. He later earned a JD at Loyola University in 2019.

Mitchell began his career as a faith-based community organizer with Southsiders Organized for Unity and Liberation (SOUL). His work with SOUL focused on education funding reform, affordable housing, and economic empowerment for low-income communities. In 2009, Mitchell drafted legislation that became the Urban Weatherization Initiative, a $425 million program designed to put people to work weatherproofing houses in Chicago.

In 2010, Mitchell worked as a deputy field director for Illinois Attorney General Lisa Madigan's reelection campaign and managed Will Burns' successful campaign for alderman of the 4th Ward. He was a senior advisor to Cook County President Toni Preckwinkle from May 2011 to November 2011, serving as Director of Outreach and External Relations. Preckwinkle credits Mitchell with keeping the Todd Stroger sales tax repeal from unravelling in the Cook County budgeting process. Mitchell was named to Chicago Mayor-elect Rahm Emanuel's transition team in March 2011.

In 2012, Mitchell acted as the Midwest director of Paid Media and Polling for President Barack Obama's reelection campaign. He worked as a senior vice president at The Strategy Group from 2014 to 2017, executing strategic communications plans for Democratic candidates across the United States. Christian has consulted for State Assembly and Congressional races across the country and was a senior advisor on Senator Tammy Duckworth's successful 2016 campaign and Governor J.B. Pritzker's successful 2018 campaign.

== Illinois state representative ==
Mitchell was first elected to the Illinois House of Representatives in November 2012 and was sworn into office in January 2013. He was the youngest member of the 98th General Assembly. Mitchell was reelected to his seat in 2014, 2016, and 2018.

During his tenure, Mitchell sponsored or co-sponsored legislation addressing police accountability, criminal justice reform, and marijuana decriminalization.

=== Committees served ===
Chairmanships and vice-chairmanships:

- House Committee on Economic Opportunity (chairperson)
- House Committee on Cybersecurity, Data Analytics, and IT (Vice-chairperson)

Committee assignments:

- Appropriations – Higher Education Committee
- Judiciary – Criminal Committee
- State Government Administration Committee

Subcommittee assignments:

- Appropriations – Cost Analysis Subcommittee
- Cybersecurity, Data Analytics, and IT – Distributed Ledgers and Cryptocurrency Subcommittee
- Judiciary – Criminal Administration and Enforcement Subcommittee
- Judiciary – Firearms and Firearm Safety Subcommittee
- Judiciary – Sex Offenses and Sex Offender Registration Subcommittee

=== Caucus memberships ===
- Black Caucus

=== Votes, legislation, and policy stances ===
==== Education ====
In the 99th General Assembly, Mitchell proposed the Fund Education First Act as a long-term solution to restore education funding in Illinois. According to supporters, the proposed legislation would generate an additional $1 billion in funding to schools statewide and increase investment in Chicago Public Schools by $200 million without increasing local property taxes.

Mitchell sponsored legislation to establish an elected Chicago Board of Education, whose members were appointed by the mayor during his tenure.

In 2018, Mitchell sponsored SB 2892, a bill to raise the minimum salary for teachers in Illinois – set at $9,000 since 1980. Mitchell's bill would have raised the minimum salary for teachers to $32,076 the following year, and $40,000 by 2022. The Illinois General Assembly passed Mitchell's bill in May 2018, with bipartisan support. On August 26, 2018, Governor Bruce Rauner vetoed the bill.

==== Gun control ====
In 2014, Mitchell called for the establishment of a Gun Trafficking Control Task Force to stop illegal guns from reaching criminals. He introduced legislation to impose additional regulations on gun dealerships, such as 24/7 video surveillance, mandatory background checks on employees working at gun dealerships, detailed record keeping, and zoning restrictions. Representative Mitchell also proposed legislation calling for a 2% tax on the sale of ammunition to fund trauma centers in Illinois.

In 2018, Mitchell voted for HB 1467, a measure to ban bump stocks in Illinois.

==== Jobs, employment, taxes, economy ====
Mitchell is opposed to Right to Work policies. In 2015, he supported the Fair Arbitration Bill (SB 1229), which would have allowed the State to reach a renewed collective bargaining agreement with its unionized employees through arbitration rather than a lockout or strike.

In February 2015, Mitchell introduced a bill to guarantee that all workers in Illinois have the right to paid sick time. He also co-sponsored legislation that became law to expand access to SNAP benefits for families that include an elderly, disabled, or blind person.

In 2016, Mitchell advocated amending the constitution to create a graduated state income tax, in which lower earners pay a lower rate and higher earners pay a higher rate. He also supported expanding the State Earned Income Tax Credit to reduce the tax burden on lower and middle income families.

==== Environment ====
Mitchell was a chief co-sponsor of the Illinois Clean Jobs Bill, which will create an estimated 32,000 new jobs; lower electricity costs; and reduce the state's carbon footprint. Mitchell was a vocal supporter of a stronger Renewable Portfolio Standard, which steered a larger share of state investments to sustainable energy sources.

In 2018, Mitchell was the Chief House Sponsor of SB 3156, a bill aimed at increasing transparency around Illinois Environmental Protection Agency investigations.

From 2014-2018, Mitchell's record on the environment earned a 100% rating from the Illinois Environmental Council.

==== Child care ====
Mitchell is a supporter of state sponsored child care. In 2015, in response to Governor Rauner's reduction of Illinois's child care program, Mitchell became the chief sponsor of legislation to expand state-subsidized child care to 200% of the Federal Poverty Level.

In March 2017, Mitchell introduced HB 3595, a bill that would create tax credits to help working parents cover child care expenses.

==== Law enforcement and criminal justice reform ====
In 2017, Mitchell proposed legislation eliminating cash bail.

In 2018, Mitchell co-sponsored the Police and Community Relations Improvement Act, which expanded access to body cameras, requires additional training for police officers, and requires police departments to conduct independent investigations of police involved deaths.

In 2015, Mitchell co-sponsored HB 218, legislation to decriminalize marijuana by eliminating criminal penalties associated with the possession of 15 grams or less of marijuana. Governor Rauner vetoed the bill in August 2015.

== Democratic Party of Illinois ==
In July 2018, Mitchell was named Interim Executive Director of the Democratic Party of Illinois, succeeding Tim Mapes, who had resigned following allegations of workplace harassment. He was the first African American to serve in the role.

During his tenure, Mitchell also hired a full time voter protection coordinator and created a voter protection hotline at the start of Illinois's early voting period.

Under Mitchell's leadership, the Party spent more than $27M to support over 100 Democratic candidates and local Democratic party organizations in Illinois.

== Deputy Governor of Illinois ==
On December 20, 2018, J.B. Pritzker announced Mitchell would be a Deputy Governor in his administration for Environment, Infrastructure, and Public Safety. Mitchell resigned from the Illinois House on January 11, 2019, to assume the position.

State agencies under Mitchell's oversight as Deputy Governor included the Illinois Department of Transportation, Capital Development Board, Environmental Protection Agency, Department of Natural Resources, Emergency Management Agency, National Guard, Department of Innovation and Technology, State Police, and Department of Corrections.

Mitchell advocated for and participated in negotiations over the Cannabis Regulation and Tax Act of 2019, which legalized recreational marijuana in IL. The bill also established processes to expunge eligible marijuana-related arrest and conviction records, created licensing advantages and financial assistance for cannabis programs owned by people from communities disproportionately affected by drug enforcement, and directs portions of cannabis revenue towards mental health and substance-use treatment services.

During the 2019 legislative session, Mitchell helped negotiate and oversaw the implementation of "Rebuild Illinois", a $45 billion infrastructure program enacted in 2019 to fund improvements to roads, bridges, public transit, educational facilities, and other infrastructure across the state.

== Other work ==
Since 2023, Mitchell has been the Vice President for Civic Engagement at the University of Chicago. He also received a commission as an officer in the Illinois National Guard in 2023, serving as a judge advocate with the 182nd Airlift Wing. In 2024, Governor Pritzker appointed Mitchell to the board of the Metropolitan Pier and Exposition Authority (commonly nicknamed "McPier").

== 2026 lieutenant gubernatorial candidacy ==
On July 1, 2025, Governor Pritzker announced that Mitchell would be his running mate in the 2026 election after incumbent Lieutenant Governor Juliana Stratton announced she would instead run for US Senate.

== Electoral history ==
2018 General Election for State Representative, 26th District

Party	Candidate	Votes	% of votes
DEM	Christian L. Mitchell	35,992	100%

2018 Primary Election for State Representative, 26th District

Party	Candidate	Votes	% of votes
DEM	Christian L. Mitchell	15,926	100%

2016 Primary Election for State Representative, 26th District

Party	Candidate	Votes	% of votes
DEM	Christian L. Mitchell	14,735	56.2%
DEM	Jhatayn "Jay" Travis	11,489	43.8%
REP	Tondalaya Marie Nelson	0	0%
Vote Total		26,224	

2016 General Election for State Representative, 26th District

Party	Candidate	Votes	% of votes
DEM	Christian L. Mitchell	40,251	100%

2014 Primary Election for State Representative, 26th District

Party	Candidate	Votes	% of votes
DEM	Christian L. Mitchell	4,949	46.0%
DEM	Jhatayn "Jay" Travis	4,393	40.8%
REP	Jacob "Coby" Hakalir	1,427	13.3%
Vote Total		10,769	

2014 General Election for State Representative, 26th District

Party	Candidate	Votes	% of votes
DEM	Christian L. Mitchell	25,715	83.5%
REP	Jacob "Coby" Hakalir	5,083	16.5%
Vote Total		30,798	

2012 Primary Election for State Representative, 26th District

Party	Candidate	Votes	% of votes
DEM	Christian L. Mitchell	6,739	51.9%
DEM	Kenny Johnson	6,238	48.1%
Vote Total		12,977	

2012 General Election for State Representative, 26th District

Party	Candidate	Votes	% of votes
DEM	Christian L. Mitchell	37,002	100%

Party political offices
Preceded by Juliana Stratton	Democratic nominee for Lieutenant Governor of Illinois; 2026	Most recent
Political offices
Preceded by Juliana Stratton	Lieutenant Governor of Illinois; Assuming office 2027	Elect
