= 2024 United States House of Representatives elections in Illinois =

- November 5, 2024

All 17 Illinois seats to the United States House of Representatives
	Majority party	Minority party
Party	Democratic	Republican
Last election	14	3
Seats won	14	3
Seat change	Steady	Steady
Popular vote	2,829,169	2,517,389
Percentage	52.78%	46.97%
Swing	▼3.31%	▲3.29%

Democratic
50–60%
60–70%
70–80%
80–90%
Republican
50–60%
60–70%
70–80%
80–90%
>90%

The 2024 United States House of Representatives elections in Illinois were held on November 5, 2024, to elect the 17 U.S. representatives from the State of Illinois, one from each of the state's 17 congressional districts. The elections coincided with the 2024 U.S. presidential election, as well as other elections to the House of Representatives, elections to the United States Senate, and various state and local elections. The primary elections were held on March 19, 2024.

== Overview ==
=== Statewide ===
Party	Candi- dates	Votes		Seats		
Party	Candi- dates	No.	%	No.	+/–	%
Democratic Party	15	2,829,169	52.78%	14	Steady	82%
Republican Party	17	2,517,389	46.97%	3	Steady	18%
Working Class Party	1	10,704	0.20%	0	Steady	0%
Write-ins	–	2,792	0.05%	0	Steady	0%
Total	33	5,360,054	100%	17	Steady	100%

Popular vote
Democratic	52.78%
Republican	46.97%
Other	0.25%

House seats
Democratic	82.35%
Republican	17.65%

=== District ===
District	Democratic		Republican		Others		Total		Result
District	Votes	%	Votes	%	Votes	%	Votes	%	Result
District 1	208,398	65.84%	108,064	34.14%	45	0.01%	316,507	100.0%	Democratic hold
District 2	195,777	67.55%	94,004	32.43%	62	0.02%	289,843	100.0%	Democratic hold
District 3	174,825	67.26%	84,987	32.70%	96	0.04%	259,908	100.0%	Democratic hold
District 4	139,343	67.51%	56,323	27.29%	10,730	5.20%	206,396	100.0%	Democratic hold
District 5	251,025	68.97%	112,931	31.03%	9	0.00%	363,965	100.0%	Democratic hold
District 6	196,647	54.20%	166,116	45.78%	86	0.02%	362,849	100.0%	Democratic hold
District 7	222,408	83.25%	44,598	16.69%	146	0.05%	267,152	100.0%	Democratic hold
District 8	172,920	57.06%	130,153	42.94%	0	0.00%	303,073	100.0%	Democratic hold
District 9	231,722	68.39%	107,106	31.61%	0	0.00%	338,828	100.0%	Democratic hold
District 10	196,358	59.93%	131,025	39.99%	238	0.07%	327,621	100.0%	Democratic hold
District 11	199,825	55.56%	159,630	44.38%	229	0.06%	359,684	100.0%	Democratic hold
District 12	94,875	25.81%	272,754	74.19%	0	0.00%	367,629	100.0%	Republican hold
District 13	191,339	58.07%	137,917	41.86%	244	0.07%	329,500	100.0%	Democratic hold
District 14	183,446	55.10%	149,464	44.89%	19	0.01%	332,929	100.0%	Democratic hold
District 15	0	0.00%	308,825	99.55%	1,409	0.45%	310,234	100.0%	Republican hold
District 16	0	0.00%	310,925	99.94%	183	0.06%	311,108	100.0%	Republican hold
District 17	170,261	54.43%	142,567	45.57%	0	0.00%	312,828	100.0%	Democratic hold
Total	2,829,169	52.78%	2,517,389	46.97%	13,496	0.25%	5,360,054	100.0%	

== District 1 ==
2024 Illinois's 1st congressional district election

Nominee	Jonathan Jackson	Marcus Lewis
Party	Democratic	Republican
Popular vote	208,398	108,064
Percentage	65.8%	34.1%
- Jackson: 50–60% 60–70% 70–80% 80–90% >90% Lewis: 50–60% 60–70% 70–80%
U.S. Representative before election
Jonathan Jackson
Democratic
Elected U.S. Representative
Jonathan Jackson
Democratic

The 1st district is based in the South Side of Chicago, including portions of Bronzeville, Hyde Park, Grand Crossing, Morgan Park, and Roseland, but also reaches down to the southwest and takes in a collection of exurban and rural areas in Cook County, Will County, and Kankakee County, including New Lenox and Homer Glen. The incumbent was Democrat Jonathan Jackson, who was elected with 67.0% of the vote in 2022.

=== Democratic primary ===
==== Nominee ====
- Jonathan Jackson, incumbent U.S. representative

==== Endorsements ====
Jonathan Jackson

Organizations

- Humane Society Legislative Fund

Labor unions

- Chicago Federation of Labor
- IBEW Local 134
- Illinois AFL-CIO
- International Brotherhood of Teamsters Joint Council 25
- IUOE Local 150

==== Fundraising ====
Campaign finance reports as of February 28, 2024
Candidate	Raised	Spent	Cash on hand
Jonathan Jackson (D)	$245,349	$207,306	$39,146
Source: Federal Election Commission

=== Results ===
Democratic primary results
Party	Candidate	Votes	%
Democratic	Jonathan Jackson (incumbent)	72,420	100.0
Total votes		72,420	100.0

=== Republican primary ===
==== Nominee ====
- Marcus Lewis, postal worker and perennial candidate

==== Eliminated in primary ====
- Montelle Gaji, law school student

==== Endorsements ====
Montelle Gaji

Newspapers

- Chicago Tribune

=== Results ===
Republican primary results
Party	Candidate	Votes	%
Republican	Marcus Lewis	15,282	80.0
Republican	Montelle Gaji	3,814	20.0
Total votes		19,096	100.0

=== General election ===
==== Predictions ====
Source	Ranking	As of
The Cook Political Report	Solid D	February 2, 2023
Inside Elections	Solid D	March 10, 2023
Sabato's Crystal Ball	Safe D	February 7, 2024
Elections Daily	Safe D	June 8, 2023
CNalysis	Solid D	November 16, 2023

==== Results ====
2024 Illinois's 1st congressional district election
Party	Candidate	Votes	%
Democratic	Jonathan Jackson (incumbent)	208,398	65.8
Republican	Marcus Lewis	108,064	34.1
Write-in		45	0.0
Total votes		316,507	100.0
Democratic hold			

== District 2 ==
2024 Illinois's 2nd congressional district election
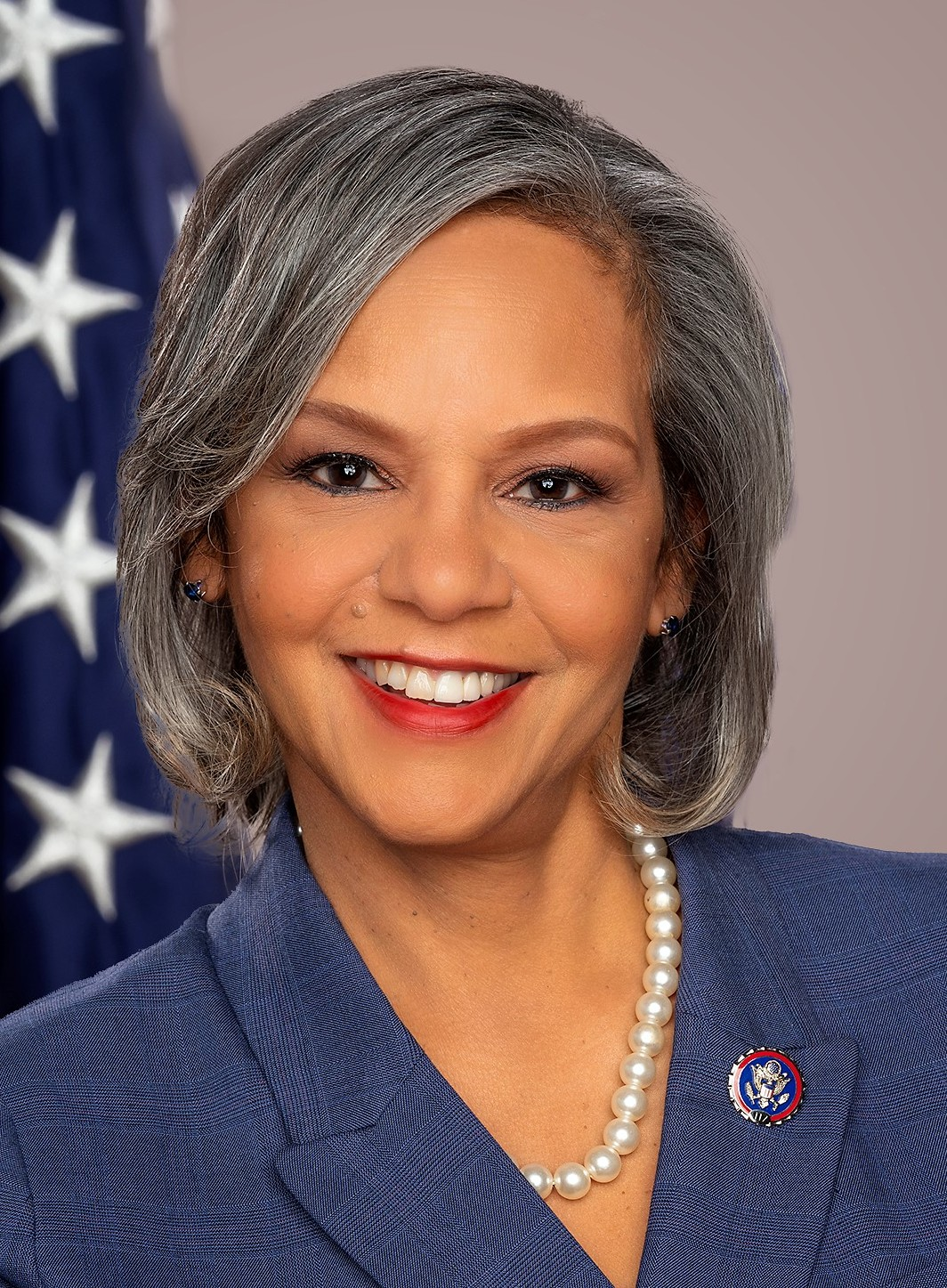

Nominee	Robin Kelly	Ashley Ramos
Party	Democratic	Republican
Popular vote	195,777	94,004
Percentage	67.6%	32.4%
- Kelly: 50–60% 60–70% 70–80% 80–90% 90%+ Ramos: 50–60% 60–70% 70–80% 80–90% 90%+ Tie: 50%
U.S. Representative before election
Robin Kelly
Democratic
Elected U.S. Representative
Robin Kelly
Democratic

The 2nd district includes the far southeast portion of Chicago and part of its southern suburbs, as well as portions of Will, Kankakee, Iroquois, and Vermillion counties along the Indiana border. The incumbent was Democrat Robin Kelly, who was re-elected with 67.1% of the vote in 2022.

=== Democratic primary ===
==== Nominee ====
- Robin Kelly, incumbent U.S. representative

==== Endorsements ====
Robin Kelly

U.S representatives

- Gabby Giffords, former U.S. representative from Arizona's 8th congressional district (2007–2012)

Organizations

- Everytown for Gun Safety Action Fund
- Feminist Majority PAC
- Giffords
- Humane Society Legislative Fund
- J Street PAC
- Joint Action Committee for Political Affairs
- Planned Parenthood Action Fund

Labor unions

- Chicago Federation of Labor
- IBEW Local 134
- Illinois AFL-CIO
- International Brotherhood of Teamsters Joint Council 25
- IUOE Local 150
- National Education Association
- United Auto Workers

==== Fundraising ====
Campaign finance reports as of February 28, 2024
Candidate	Raised	Spent	Cash on hand
Robin Kelly (D)	$933,357	$880,938	$1,499,583
Source: Federal Election Commission

=== Results ===
Democratic primary results
Party	Candidate	Votes	%
Democratic	Robin Kelly (incumbent)	56,732	100.0
Total votes		56,732	100.0

=== Republican primary ===
==== Nominee ====
- Ashley Ramos, eCommerce specialist and candidate for this district in 2022

==== Results ====
Republican primary results
Party	Candidate	Votes	%
Republican	Ashley Ramos	20,527	100.0
Total votes		20,527	100.0

=== General election ===
==== Predictions ====
Source	Ranking	As of
The Cook Political Report	Solid D	February 2, 2023
Inside Elections	Solid D	March 10, 2023
Sabato's Crystal Ball	Safe D	February 7, 2024
Elections Daily	Safe D	June 8, 2023
CNalysis	Solid D	November 16, 2023

==== Results ====
2024 Illinois's 2nd congressional district election
Party	Candidate	Votes	%
Democratic	Robin Kelly (incumbent)	195,777	67.6
Republican	Ashley Ramos	94,004	32.4
Write-in		62	0.0
Total votes		289,843	100.0
Democratic hold			

== District 3 ==
2024 Illinois's 3rd congressional district election
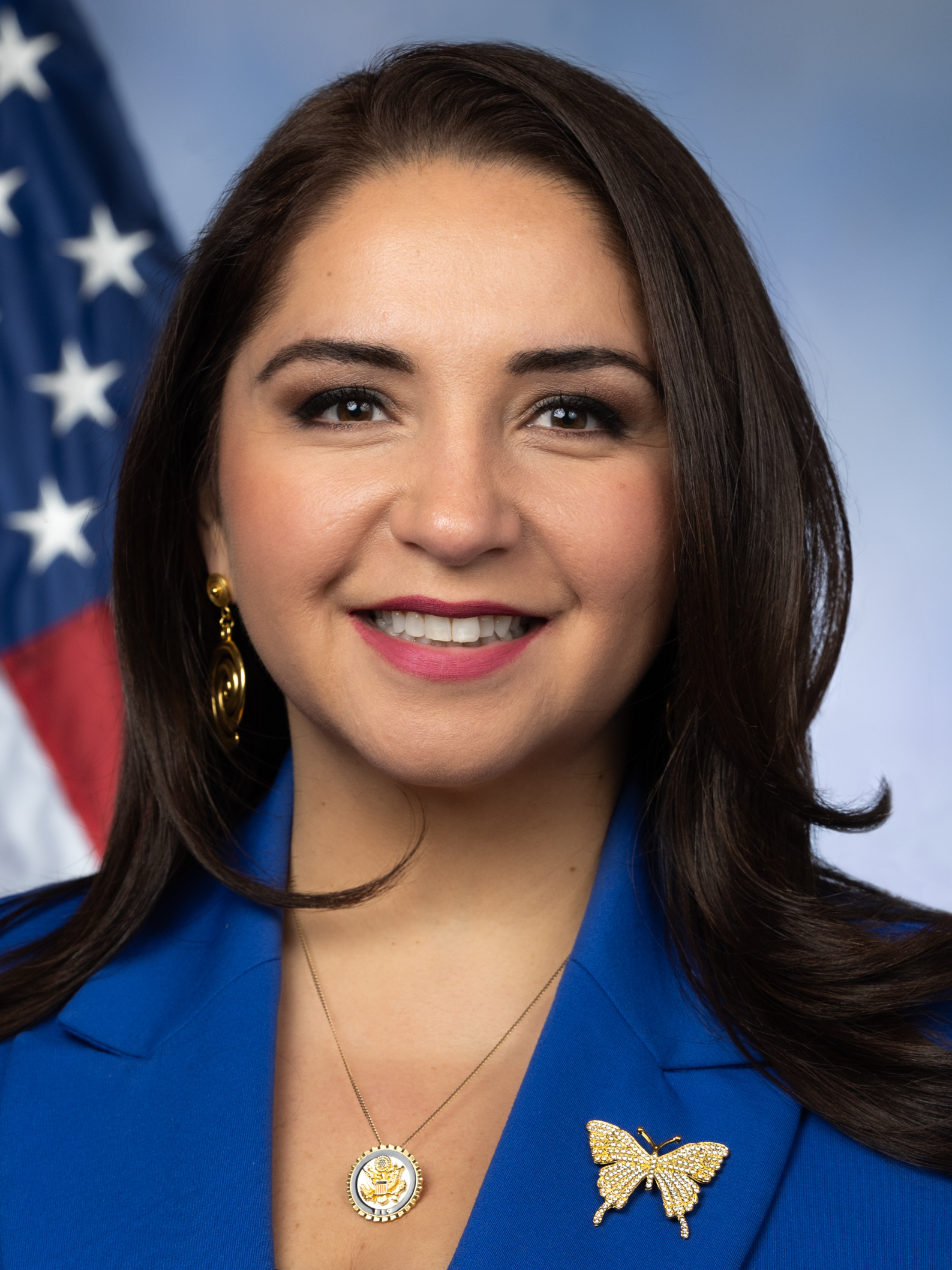

Nominee	Delia Ramirez	John Booras
Party	Democratic	Republican
Popular vote	174,825	84,987
Percentage	67.3%	32.7%
- County results Ramirez: 50–60% 70–80%
U.S. Representative before election
Delia Ramirez
Democratic
Elected U.S. Representative
Delia Ramirez
Democratic

The 3rd district is based in northwestern Chicago, including the neighborhoods of Albany Park, Belmont Cragin, Dunning, Humboldt Park, Irving Park, Logan Square, Montclare, Portage Park, and West Town. It also includes parts of the DuPage County suburbs, taking in all or parts of Addison, Bartlett, Bensenville, Elgin, Elk Grove Village, Elmwood Park, Franklin Park, Glendale Heights, Hanover Park, River Grove, Wayne, West Chicago, Wheaton, and Wood Dale. The incumbent was Democrat Delia Ramirez, who was elected with 68.5% of the vote in 2022.

=== Democratic primary ===
==== Nominee ====
- Delia Ramirez, incumbent U.S. representative

==== Endorsements ====
Delia Ramirez

Organizations

- Humane Society Legislative Fund
- J Street PAC
- Jewish Voice for Peace Action fund (post-primary)
- Justice Democrats
- National Women's Political Caucus
- Peace Action
- Sierra Club
- United Working Families
- Working Families Party

Labor unions

- Chicago Federation of Labor
- IBEW Local 134
- Illinois AFL-CIO
- International Brotherhood of Teamsters Joint Council 25
- IUOE Local 150
- National Education Association
- United Auto Workers

==== Fundraising ====
Campaign finance reports as of February 28, 2024
Candidate	Raised	Spent	Cash on hand
Delia Ramirez (D)	$616,246	$409,386	$325,561
Source: Federal Election Commission

=== Results ===
Democratic primary results
Party	Candidate	Votes	%
Democratic	Delia Ramirez (incumbent)	52,644	100.0
Total votes		52,644	100.0

=== Republican primary ===
==== Nominee ====
- John Booras, attorney

=== Results ===
Republican primary results
Party	Candidate	Votes	%
Republican	John Booras	15,468	100.0
Total votes		15,468	100.0

=== General election ===
==== Predictions ====
Source	Ranking	As of
The Cook Political Report	Solid D	February 2, 2023
Inside Elections	Solid D	March 10, 2023
Sabato's Crystal Ball	Safe D	February 7, 2024
Elections Daily	Safe D	June 8, 2023
CNalysis	Solid D	November 16, 2023

==== Results ====
2024 Illinois's 3rd congressional district election
Party	Candidate	Votes	%
Democratic	Delia Ramirez (incumbent)	174,825	67.3
Republican	John Booras	84,987	32.7
Write-in		96	0.0
Total votes		259,908	100.0
Democratic hold			

== District 4 ==
2024 Illinois's 4th congressional district election
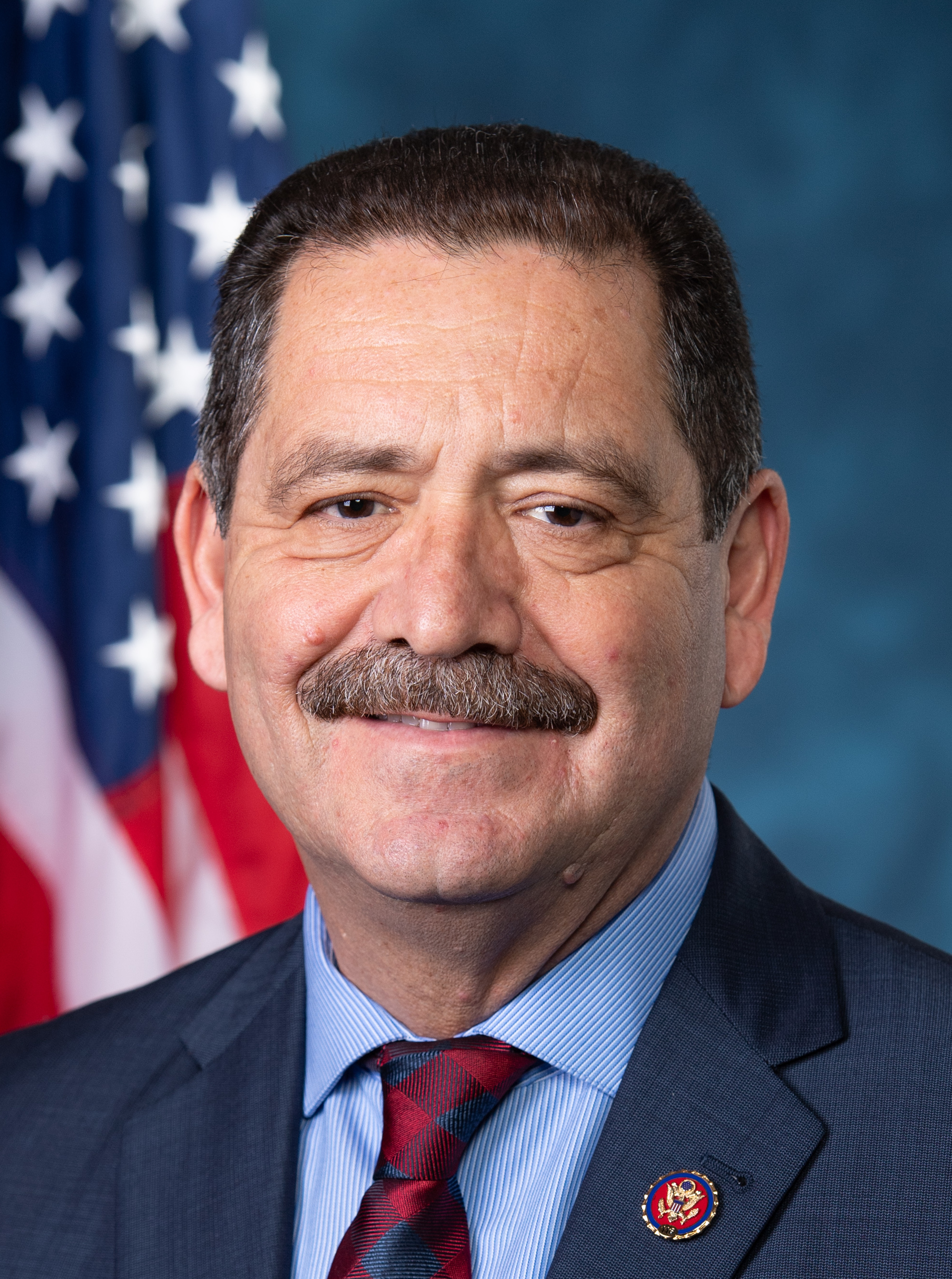

Nominee	Chuy García	Lupe Castillo	Ed Hershey
Party	Democratic	Republican	Working Class
Popular vote	139,343	56,323	10,704
Percentage	67.5%	27.3%	5.2%
- County results García: 60–70% Castillo: 40–50%
U.S. Representative before election
Chuy García
Democratic
Elected U.S. Representative
Chuy García
Democratic

The 4th district is based in southwest Chicago, including Ashburn, Brighton Park, Clearing, Gage Park, Garfield Ridge, South Lawndale, West Elsdon, and West Lawn, and in the western Chicago suburbs, including Cicero and Berwyn. The incumbent was Democrat Chuy García, who was re-elected with 68.4% of the vote in 2022.

=== Democratic primary ===
==== Nominee ====
- Chuy García, incumbent U.S. representative

==== Eliminated in primary ====
- Raymond Lopez, Chicago alder from the 15th ward, candidate for this district in 2018, and candidate for mayor of Chicago in 2023

==== Endorsements ====
Chuy García

Organizations

- Friends of the Earth Action
- Humane Society Legislative Fund
- J Street PAC
- Latino Victory Fund
- Peace Action
- Population Connection Action Fund
- Sierra Club

Labor unions

- AFSCME Council 31
- Association of Flight Attendants
- Chicago Federation of Labor
- IBEW Local 134
- Illinois AFL-CIO
- International Brotherhood of Teamsters Joint Council 25
- IUOE Local 150
- National Education Association
- United Auto Workers
Raymond Lopez

Labor unions

- Fraternal Order of Police Lodge 7

Newspapers

- Chicago Tribune
- Daily Herald

==== Fundraising ====
Campaign finance reports as of February 28, 2024
Candidate	Raised	Spent	Cash on hand
Chuy García (D)	$487,345	$406,453	$105,916
Raymond Lopez (D)	$72,279	$38,325	$33,953
Source: Federal Election Commission

=== Results ===
Democratic primary results
Party	Candidate	Votes	%
Democratic	Chuy García (incumbent)	30,443	69.6
Democratic	Raymond Lopez	13,286	30.4
Total votes		43,729	100.0

=== Working Class Party ===
==== Nominee ====
- Ed Hershey, high school teacher and nominee for this district in 2022

=== General election ===
==== Predictions ====
Source	Ranking	As of
The Cook Political Report	Solid D	February 2, 2023
Inside Elections	Solid D	March 10, 2023
Sabato's Crystal Ball	Safe D	February 7, 2024
Elections Daily	Safe D	June 8, 2023
CNalysis	Solid D	November 16, 2023

==== Results ====
2024 Illinois's 4th congressional district election
Party	Candidate	Votes	%
Democratic	Chuy García (incumbent)	139,343	67.5
Republican	Lupe Castillo	56,323	27.3
Working Class	Ed Hershey	10,704	5.2
Write-in		26	0.0
Total votes		206,396	100.0
Democratic hold			

== District 5 ==
2024 Illinois's 5th congressional district election
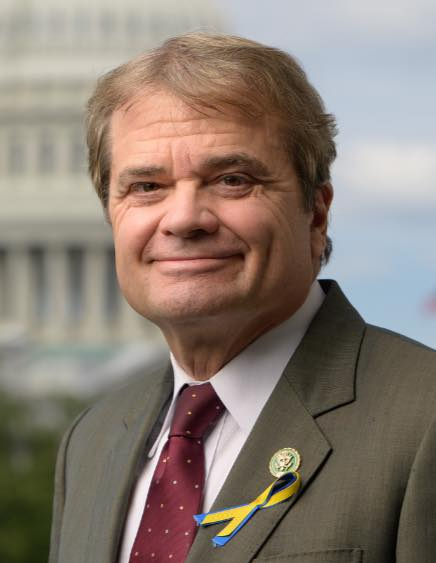

Nominee	Mike Quigley	Tommy Hanson
Party	Democratic	Republican
Popular vote	251,025	112,931
Percentage	69.0%	31.0%
- Quigley: 50–60% 70–80%
U.S. Representative before election
Mike Quigley
Democratic
Elected U.S. Representative
Mike Quigley
Democratic

The 5th district includes portions of northern Chicago, including Albany Park, Forest Glen, Lake View, Lincoln Park, Lincoln Square, Norwood Park, North Center, North Park, O'Hare, and West Ridge. It also takes in the northwest Chicago suburbs, including Arlington Heights and Palatine. The incumbent was Democrat Mike Quigley, who was re-elected with 69.6% of the vote in 2022.

=== Democratic primary ===
==== Nominee ====
- Mike Quigley, incumbent U.S. representative

==== Disqualified ====
- Jonathan Bishop, high school teacher
- Jerico Cruz, marketing research consultant and independent candidate for this district in 2022

==== Declined ====
- Margaret Croke, state representative
- Matt Martin, Chicago alder from the 47th ward

==== Endorsements ====
Mike Quigley

Organizations

- AIPAC
- Humane Society Legislative Fund
- Joint Action Committee for Political Affairs
- Population Connection Action Fund
- Pro-Israel America

Labor unions

- AFSCME Council 31
- Chicago Federation of Labor
- IBEW Local 134
- Illinois AFL-CIO
- International Brotherhood of Teamsters Joint Council 25
- IUOE Local 150
- National Education Association

==== Fundraising ====
Campaign finance reports as of February 28, 2024
Candidate	Raised	Spent	Cash on hand
Mike Quigley (D)	$574,258	$736,275	$1,023,443
Source: Federal Election Commission

==== Results ====
Democratic primary results
Party	Candidate	Votes	%
Democratic	Mike Quigley (incumbent)	87,002	100.0
Total votes		87,002	100.0

=== Republican primary ===
==== Nominee ====
- Tommy Hanson, real estate broker and nominee for this district in 2008, 2018, 2020, and 2022

==== Fundraising ====
Campaign finance reports as of February 28, 2024
Candidate	Raised	Spent	Cash on hand
Tommy Hanson (R)	$300	$0	$2,345
Source: Federal Election Commission

==== Results ====
Republican primary results
Party	Candidate	Votes	%
Republican	Tommy Hanson	18,841	100.0
Total votes		18,841	100.0

=== General election ===
==== Predictions ====
Source	Ranking	As of
The Cook Political Report	Solid D	February 2, 2023
Inside Elections	Solid D	March 10, 2023
Sabato's Crystal Ball	Safe D	February 7, 2024
Elections Daily	Safe D	June 8, 2023
CNalysis	Solid D	November 16, 2023

==== Results ====
2024 Illinois's 5th congressional district election
Party	Candidate	Votes	%
Democratic	Mike Quigley (incumbent)	251,025	69.0
Republican	Tommy Hanson	112,931	31.0
Write-in		9	0.0
Total votes		363,965	100.0
Democratic hold			

== District 6 ==
2024 Illinois's 6th congressional district election

Nominee	Sean Casten	Niki Conforti
Party	Democratic	Republican
Popular vote	196,647	166,116
Percentage	54.2%	45.8%
- County results Casten: 50–60%
U.S. Representative before election
Sean Casten
Democratic
Elected U.S. Representative
Sean Casten
Democratic

The 6th district is based in the southwest Chicago suburbs, including Oak Lawn and Downers Grove, as well as parts of the eastern DuPage County suburbs. The incumbent was Democrat Sean Casten, who was re-elected with 54.4% of the vote in 2022.

=== Democratic primary ===
==== Nominee ====
- Sean Casten, incumbent U.S. representative

==== Eliminated in primary ====
- Mahnoor Ahmad, public health policy director
- Charles Hughes, municipal employee and perennial candidate

==== Endorsements ====
Mahnoor Ahmad

Organizations

- Independent Voters of Illinois-Independent Precinct Organization
Sean Casten

Organizations

- 314 Action
- Democratic Majority for Israel
- Humane Society Legislative Fund
- Jewish Democratic Council of America
- Joint Action Committee for Political Affairs
- Natural Resources Defense Council
- Planned Parenthood Action Fund
- Population Connection Action Fund
- Sierra Club

Labor unions

- AFSCME Council 31
- Chicago Federation of Labor
- IBEW Local 134
- Illinois AFL-CIO
- International Brotherhood of Teamsters Joint Council 25
- IUOE Local 150
- National Education Association
- United Auto Workers

Newspapers

- Chicago Tribune

==== Fundraising ====
Campaign finance reports as of February 28, 2024
Candidate	Raised	Spent	Cash on hand
Mahnoor Ahmad (D)	$57,547	$16,546	$41,000
Sean Casten (D)	$1,680,059	$812,713	$921,762
Charles Hughes (D)	$7,946	$2,932	$21
Source: Federal Election Commission

=== Results ===
Democratic primary results
Party	Candidate	Votes	%
Democratic	Sean Casten (incumbent)	56,750	77.1
Democratic	Mahnoor Ahmad	10,483	14.2
Democratic	Charles Hughes	6,366	8.7
Total votes		73,599	100.0

=== Republican primary ===
==== Nominee ====
- Niki Conforti, energy consultant and candidate for this district in 2022

==== Fundraising ====
Campaign finance reports as of February 28, 2024
Candidate	Raised	Spent	Cash on hand
Niki Conforti (R)	$46,696 (Note: $8,000 of this total was self-funded by Conforti)	$25,709	$20,996
Source: Federal Election Commission

=== Results ===
Republican primary results
Party	Candidate	Votes	%
Republican	Niki Conforti	30,543	100.0
Total votes		30,543	100.0

=== General election ===
==== Predictions ====
Source	Ranking	As of
The Cook Political Report	Solid D	February 2, 2023
Inside Elections	Solid D	March 10, 2023
Sabato's Crystal Ball	Safe D	February 7, 2024
Elections Daily	Safe D	June 8, 2023
CNalysis	Solid D	November 16, 2023

==== Results ====
2024 Illinois's 6th congressional district election
Party	Candidate	Votes	%
Democratic	Sean Casten (incumbent)	196,647	54.2
Republican	Niki Conforti	166,116	45.8
Write-in		86	0.0
Total votes		362,849	100.0
Democratic hold			

== District 7 ==
2024 Illinois's 7th congressional district election
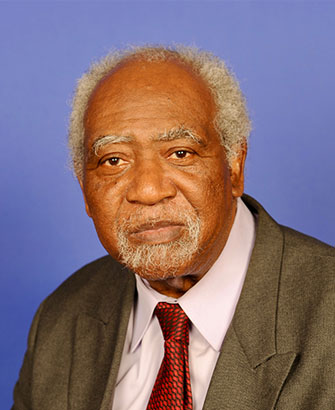

Nominee	Danny Davis	Chad Koppie
Party	Democratic	Republican
Popular vote	222,408	44,598
Percentage	83.2%	16.7%
- County results Davis: 80–90%
U.S. Representative before election
Danny Davis
Democratic
Elected U.S. Representative
Danny Davis
Democratic

The 7th district is based in the West Side and downtown of Chicago, including Austin, East Garfield Park, the Loop, the Near North Side, the Near South Side, the Near West Side, North Lawndale, West Garfield Park, and West Town. It also takes in the villages of Oak Park and Maywood. The incumbent was Democrat Danny Davis, who was re-elected unopposed in 2022.

=== Democratic primary ===
Davis was considered vulnerable in his primary after he was renominated with just 51.9% of the vote in 2022.

==== Nominee ====
- Danny Davis, incumbent U.S. representative

==== Eliminated in primary ====
- Nikhil Bhatia, member of the Galileo Scholastic Academy local school council
- Kina Collins, political organizer and candidate for this district in 2020 and 2022
- Melissa Conyears Ervin, Chicago City Treasurer (2019–present) and former state representative from the 10th district (2017–2019)
- Kouri Marshall, former aide to governor J. B. Pritzker

==== Disqualified ====
- Rhonda Sherrod, attorney and clinical psychologist

==== Endorsements ====
Kina Collins

Chicago alders

- Angela Clay, 46th ward
- Daniel La Spata, 1st ward
- Leni Manaa-Hoppenworth, 48th ward
- Byron Sigcho-Lopez, 25th ward

Other local officials

- 5 Chicago Police District Council members
- 4 Oak Park trustees

Individuals

- Julian Casablancas, lead vocalist of the Strokes

Organizations

- Peace Action
Danny Davis

Statewide officials

- J. B. Pritzker, governor of Illinois (2018–present)
- Pat Quinn, former governor of Illinois (2009–2015)
- Jesse White, former Illinois Secretary of State (1999–2023)

U.S representatives

- Jonathan Jackson, IL-01(2023–present)
- Nancy Pelosi, Speaker Emerita (2007–2011, 2019–2023) from CA-11 (1987–present)

State legislators

- Kimberly du Buclet, state representative from the 5th district (2023–present)

County officials

- 6 Cook County Commissioners

Local officials

- Brandon Johnson, mayor of Chicago (2023-present)

Chicago alders

- Shirley Coleman, 16th ward (1991-2007)

Organizations

- Humane Society Legislative Fund
- Independent Voters of Illinois-Independent Precinct Organization
- J Street PAC

Labor unions

- AFSCME Council 31
- Chicago Federation of Labor
- IBEW Local 134
- Illinois AFL-CIO
- International Brotherhood of Teamsters Joint Council 25
- United Auto Workers

Individuals

- Kurtis Blow, rapper

Newspapers

- Chicago Tribune
Melissa Conyears Ervin

Chicago alders

- Chris Taliaferro, 29th ward (2015-present)
- Jeanette Taylor, 20th ward (2019-present)

Labor unions

- Chicago Teachers Union
- International Association of Fire Fighters Local 2

==== Fundraising ====
Campaign finance reports as of February 28, 2024
Candidate	Raised	Spent	Cash on hand
Nikhil Bhatia (D)	$124,344	$110,334	$34,737
Kina Collins (D)	$72,233	$48,459	$23,774
Melissa Conyears Ervin (D)	$619,079	$532,423	$86,656
Danny Davis (D)	$457,865	$416,125	$262,377
Kouri Marshall (D)	$121,880 (Note: $15,000 of this total was self-funded by Marshall)	$111,372	$10,507
Source: Federal Election Commission

=== Results ===
Democratic primary results
Party	Candidate	Votes	%
Democratic	Danny Davis (incumbent)	42,248	52.4
Democratic	Melissa Conyears Ervin	17,154	21.3
Democratic	Kina Collins	15,188	18.9
Democratic	Nikhil Bhatia	3,808	4.7
Democratic	Kouri Marshall	2,156	2.7
Total votes		80,554	100.0

=== Republican primary ===
==== Nominee ====
- Chad Koppie, farmer and perennial candidate

=== Results ===
Republican primary results
Party	Candidate	Votes	%
Republican	Chad Koppie	5,604	100.0
Total votes		5,604	100.0

=== General election ===
==== Predictions ====
Source	Ranking	As of
The Cook Political Report	Solid D	February 2, 2023
Inside Elections	Solid D	March 10, 2023
Sabato's Crystal Ball	Safe D	February 7, 2024
Elections Daily	Safe D	June 8, 2023
CNalysis	Solid D	November 16, 2023

==== Results ====
2024 Illinois's 7th congressional district election
Party	Candidate	Votes	%
Democratic	Danny Davis (incumbent)	222,408	83.2
Republican	Chad Koppie	44,598	16.7
Write-in		146	0.1
Total votes		267,152	100.0
Democratic hold			

== District 8 ==
2024 Illinois's 8th congressional district election
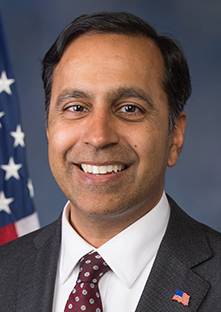

Nominee	Raja Krishnamoorthi	Mark Rice
Party	Democratic	Republican
Popular vote	172,970	130,153
Percentage	57.1%	42.9%
- County results Krishnamoorthi: 50–60% 60–70%
U.S. Representative before election
Raja Krishnamoorthi
Democratic
Elected U.S. Representative
Raja Krishnamoorthi
Democratic

The 8th district is based in the western outer suburbs of Chicago, including Elgin, Schaumburg, and Des Plaines. The incumbent was Democrat Raja Krishnamoorthi, who was re-elected with 56.9% of the vote in 2022.

=== Democratic primary ===
==== Nominee ====
- Raja Krishnamoorthi, incumbent U.S. representative

==== Endorsements ====
Raja Krishnamoorthi

Organizations

- AIPAC
- Democratic Majority for Israel
- Hindu American PAC
- Humane Society Legislative Fund
- Joint Action Committee for Political Affairs
- National Organization for Women PAC (post-primary)
- Sierra Club
- Vote Common Good

Labor unions

- Chicago Federation of Labor
- IBEW Local 134
- Illinois AFL-CIO
- International Brotherhood of Teamsters Joint Council 25
- IUOE Local 150
- National Education Association
- United Auto Workers

==== Fundraising ====
Campaign finance reports as of February 28, 2024
Candidate	Raised	Spent	Cash on hand
Raja Krishnamoorthi (D)	$6,321,316	$1,603,383	$15,904,602
Source: Federal Election Commission

=== Results ===
Democratic primary results
Party	Candidate	Votes	%
Democratic	Raja Krishnamoorthi (incumbent)	34,640	100.0
Total votes		34,640	100.0

=== Republican primary ===
==== Nominee ====
- Mark Rice, businessman and inventor

==== Endorsements ====
Mark Rice

U.S. executive branch officials

- Thomas Homan, former director of the U.S. Immigration and Customs Enforcement (2017–2018) (post-primary)

==== Fundraising ====
Campaign finance reports as of February 28, 2024
Candidate	Raised	Spent	Cash on hand
Mark Rice (R)	$139,230 (Note: $100,000 of this total was self-funded by Rice.)	$35,230	$103,999
Source: Federal Election Commission/

=== Results ===
Republican primary results
Party	Candidate	Votes	%
Republican	Mark Rice	24,362	100.0
Total votes		24,362	100.0

=== General election ===
==== Predictions ====
Source	Ranking	As of
The Cook Political Report	Solid D	February 2, 2023
Inside Elections	Solid D	March 10, 2023
Sabato's Crystal Ball	Safe D	February 7, 2024
Elections Daily	Safe D	June 8, 2023
CNalysis	Solid D	November 16, 2023

==== Results ====
2024 Illinois's 8th congressional district election
Party	Candidate	Votes	%
Democratic	Raja Krishnamoorthi (incumbent)	172,920	57.1
Republican	Mark Rice	130,153	42.9
Total votes		303,073	100.0
Democratic hold			

== District 9 ==
2024 Illinois's 9th congressional district election
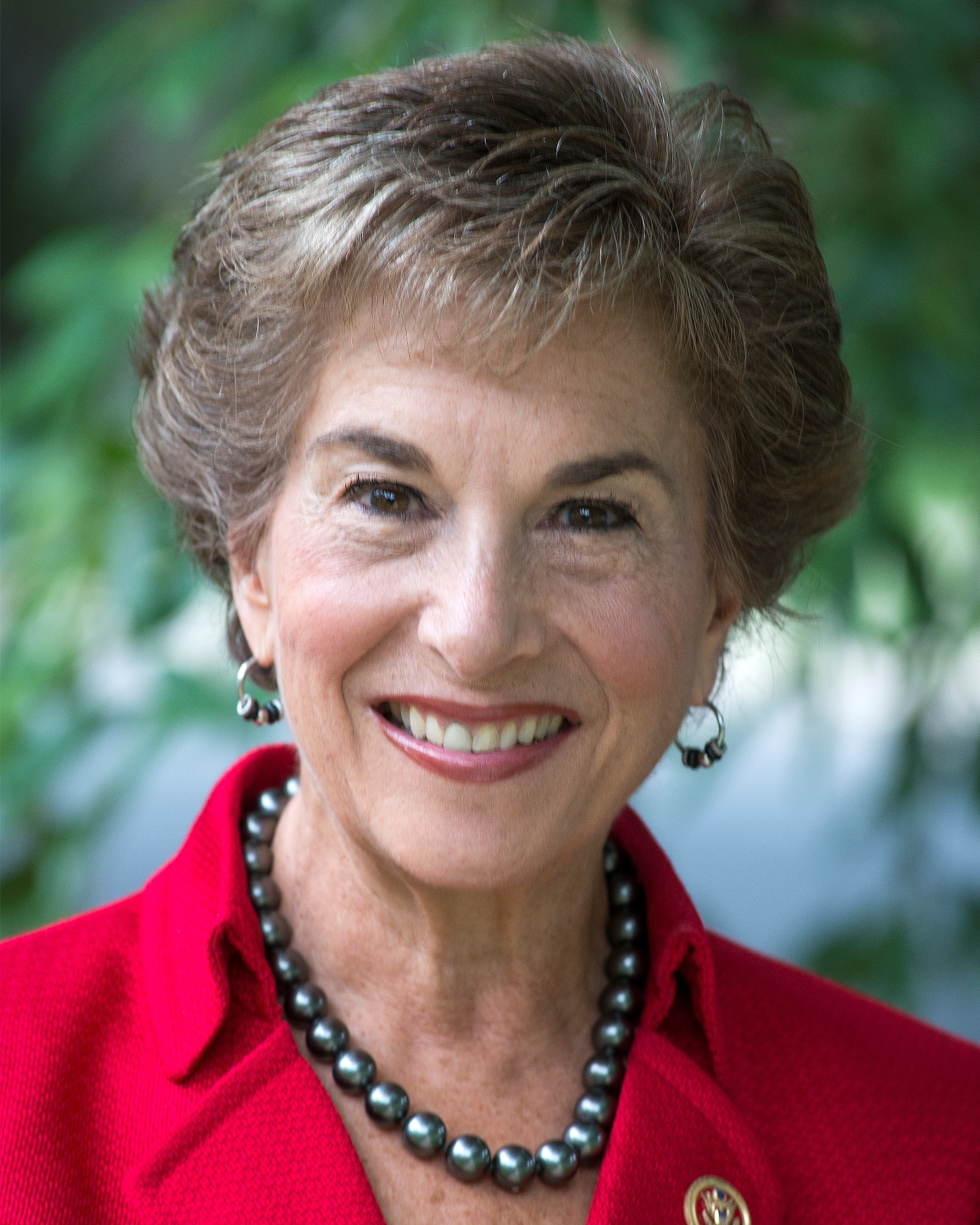

Nominee	Janice Schakowsky	Seth Cohen
Party	Democratic	Republican
Popular vote	231,722	107,106
Percentage	68.4%	31.6%
- County results Schakowsky: 50–60% 70–80%
U.S. Representative before election
Janice Schakowsky
Democratic
Elected U.S. Representative
Janice Schakowsky
Democratic

The 9th district is based in northern Chicago and the North Shore, taking in Evanston and Skokie. The incumbent was Democrat Janice Schakowsky, who was re-elected with 71.7% of the vote in 2022.

=== Democratic primary ===
==== Nominee ====
- Jan Schakowsky, incumbent U.S. representative

==== Withdrawn ====
- Michael Donahue

==== Endorsements ====
Janice Schakowsky

Organizations

- Bend the Arc
- Feminist Majority PAC
- Humane Society Legislative Fund
- J Street PAC
- Joint Action Committee for Political Affairs
- Planned Parenthood Action Fund
- Population Connection Action Fund
- Sierra Club

Labor unions

- Chicago Federation of Labor
- IBEW Local 134
- Illinois AFL-CIO
- International Brotherhood of Teamsters Joint Council 25
- IUOE Local 150
- National Education Association
- United Auto Workers
- United Farm Workers

==== Fundraising ====
Campaign finance reports as of February 28, 2024
Candidate	Raised	Spent	Cash on hand
Janice Schakowsky (D)	$961,888	$1,033,030	$829,563
Source: Federal Election Commission

=== Results ===
Democratic primary results
Party	Candidate	Votes	%
Democratic	Janice Schakowsky (incumbent)	75,106	100.0
Total votes		75,106	100.0

=== Republican primary ===
==== Nominee ====
- Seth Cohen, nonprofit executive

=== General election ===
==== Predictions ====
Source	Ranking	As of
The Cook Political Report	Solid D	February 2, 2023
Inside Elections	Solid D	March 10, 2023
Sabato's Crystal Ball	Safe D	February 7, 2024
Elections Daily	Safe D	June 8, 2023
CNalysis	Solid D	November 16, 2023

==== Results ====
2024 Illinois's 9th congressional district election
Party	Candidate	Votes	%
Democratic	Janice Schakowsky (incumbent)	231,722	68.4
Republican	Seth Cohen	107,106	31.6
Total votes		338,828	100.0
Democratic hold			

== District 10 ==
2024 Illinois's 10th congressional district election
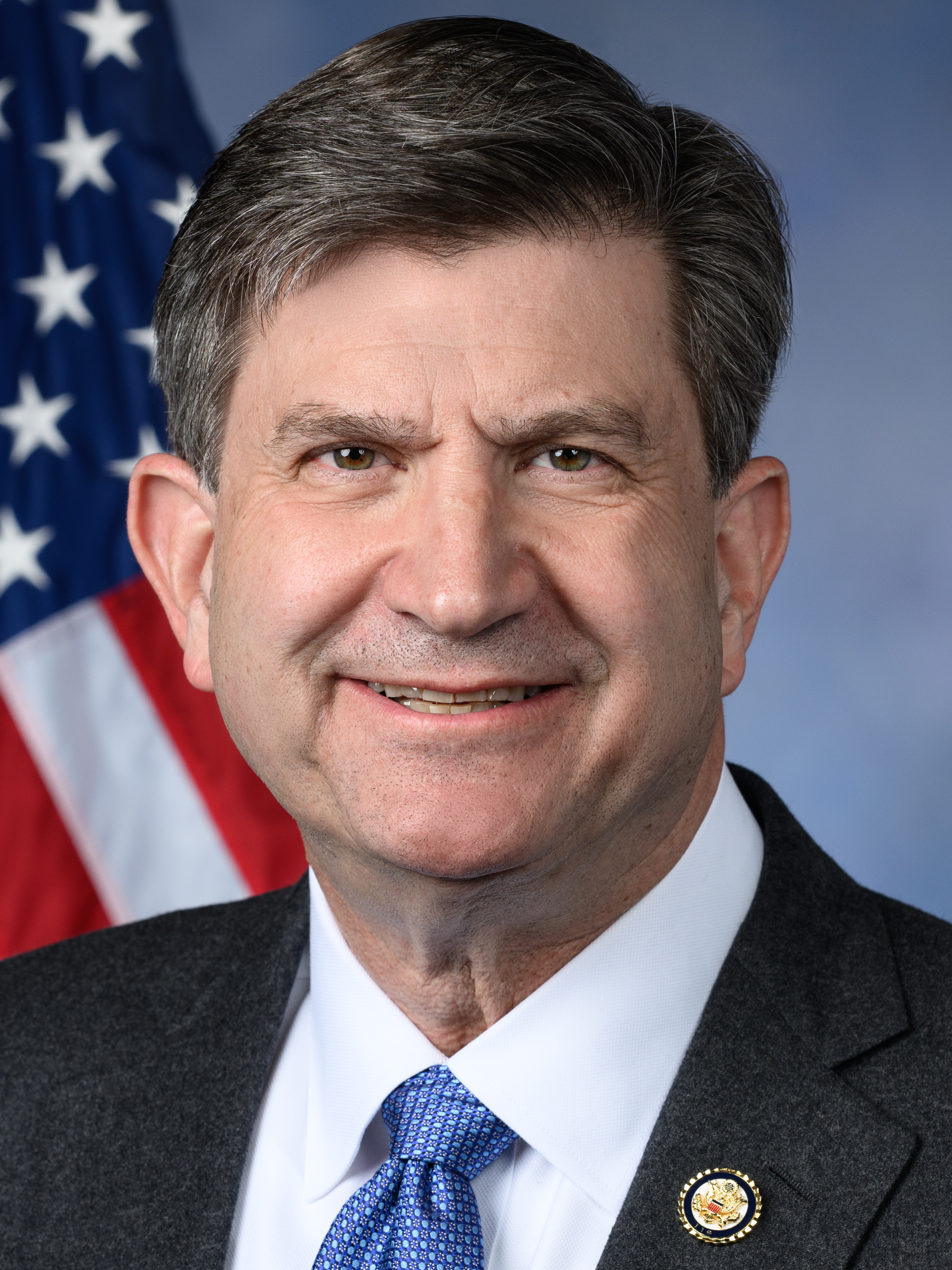

Nominee	Brad Schneider	Jim Carris
Party	Democratic	Republican
Popular vote	196,358	131,025
Percentage	59.9%	40.0%
- Schneider: 50–60% 60–70% 70–80% 80–90% Carris: 50–60% 60–70%
U.S. Representative before election
Brad Schneider
Democratic
Elected U.S. Representative
Brad Schneider
Democratic

The 10th district is based in the northern suburbs and exurbs of Chicago, including Mundelein, Northbrook, and Waukegan. The incumbent was Democrat Brad Schneider, who was re-elected with 63.0% of the vote in 2022.

=== Democratic primary ===
==== Nominee ====
- Brad Schneider, incumbent U.S. representative

==== Endorsements ====
Brad Schneider

Organizations

- AIPAC
- Democratic Majority for Israel
- Everytown for Gun Safety Action Fund
- Humane Society Legislative Fund
- Jewish Democratic Council of America
- Joint Action Committee for Political Affairs
- Population Connection Action Fund
- Pro-Israel America

Labor unions

- IBEW Local 134
- Illinois AFL-CIO
- International Brotherhood of Teamsters Joint Council 25
- IUOE Local 150
- National Education Association

==== Fundraising ====
Campaign finance reports as of February 28, 2024
Candidate	Raised	Spent	Cash on hand
Brad Schneider (D)	$2,162,912	$1,084,694	$1,187,883
Source: Federal Election Commission

=== Results ===
Democratic primary results
Party	Candidate	Votes	%
Democratic	Brad Schneider (incumbent)	37,538	100.0
Total votes		37,538	100.0

=== Republican primary ===
==== Nominee ====
- Jim Carris, commercial real estate executive

==== Fundraising ====
Campaign finance reports as of February 28, 2024
Candidate	Raised	Spent	Cash on hand
Jim Carris (R)	$312,147	$114,493	$197,654
Source: Federal Election Commission

=== Results ===
Republican primary results
Party	Candidate	Votes	%
Republican	Jim Carris	19,771	100.0
Total votes		19,771	100.0

=== General election ===
==== Predictions ====
Source	Ranking	As of
The Cook Political Report	Solid D	February 2, 2023
Inside Elections	Solid D	March 10, 2023
Sabato's Crystal Ball	Safe D	February 7, 2024
Elections Daily	Safe D	June 8, 2023
CNalysis	Solid D	November 16, 2023

===== Endorsements =====
Jim Carris

Federal officials

- Bob Dold, former U.S. representative from this district (2011–2013, 2015–2017)
- Mark Kirk, former U.S. senator from Illinois (2010–2017) & former U.S. representative from this district (2001–2010)

Statewide officials

- Leslie Munger, former Comptroller of Illinois (2015–2016)

Local officials

- Elizabeth Brandt, mayor of Lincolnshire, Illinois

==== Results ====
2024 Illinois's 10th congressional district election
Party	Candidate	Votes	%
Democratic	Brad Schneider (incumbent)	196,358	59.9
Republican	Jim Carris	131,025	40.0
Independent	Joseph Severino (write-in)	238	0.1
Total votes		327,621	100.0
Democratic hold			

==== Analysis ====
The election resulted in Democratic incumbent United States Representative Brad Schneider winning re-election in the 10th district against Republican opponent Jim Carris. Throughout the general campaign Carris emphasized issues such as inflation and immigration while Schneider ran as a political moderate and focused on the economy along with other issues.

The district took a 6% shift to the right from 2022. This shift was a result of an unfavorable national environment for Democrats and an increase of Republicans voting down-ballot during the 2024 presidential election, although this shift was not large enough to flip the district.

== District 11 ==
2024 Illinois's 11th congressional district election
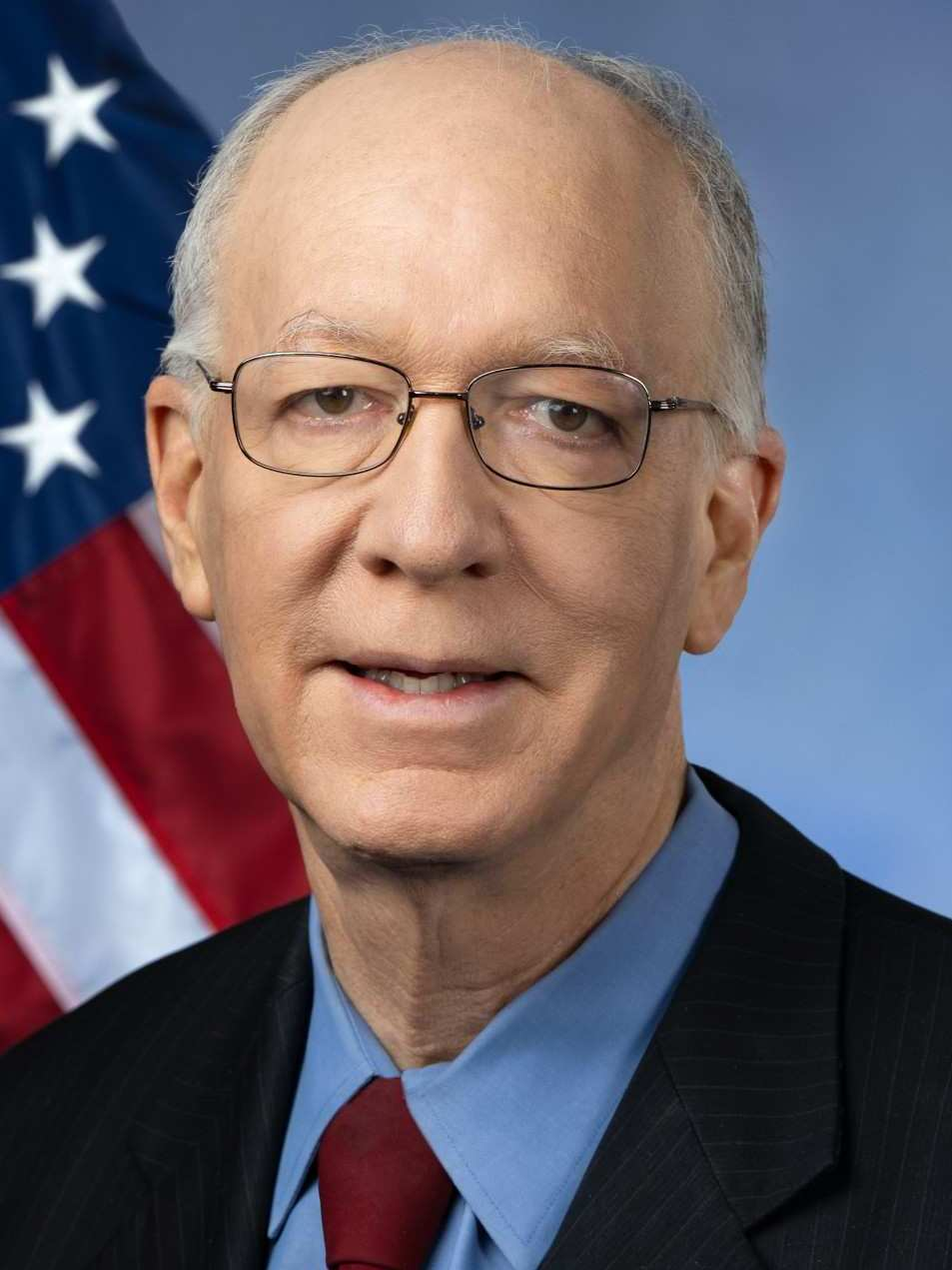

Nominee	Bill Foster	Jerry Evans
Party	Democratic	Republican
Popular vote	199,825	159,630
Percentage	55.6%	44.4%
- County results Foster: 50–60% 60–70% Evans: 50–60% 60–70%
U.S. Representative before election
Bill Foster
Democratic
Elected U.S. Representative
Bill Foster
Democratic

The 11th district is based in the western suburbs and exurbs of Chicago, including Aurora, Naperville, and Belvidere. The incumbent was Democrat Bill Foster, who was re-elected with 56.5% of the vote in 2022.

=== Democratic primary ===
==== Nominee ====
- Bill Foster, incumbent U.S. representative

==== Eliminated in primary ====
- Qasim Rashid, human rights lawyer and nominee for Virginia's 1st congressional district in 2020

==== Endorsements ====
Bill Foster

U.S. senators

- Tammy Duckworth, Illinois (2017–present)
- Dick Durbin, Illinois (1997–present)

U.S. representatives

- Sean Casten, IL-06 (2019–present)
- Danny Davis, IL-07 (1997–present)
- Chuy Garcia, IL-04 (2019–present)
- Jonathan Jackson, IL-01 (2023–present)
- Robin Kelly, IL-02 (2013–present)
- Raja Krishnamoorthi, IL-08 (2017–present)
- Mike Quigley, IL-05 (2009–present)
- Jan Schakowsky, IL-09 (1999–present)
- Brad Schneider, IL-10 (2013–2015, 2017–present)
- Eric Sorensen, IL-17 (2023–present)

Illinois statewide officials

- Mike Frerichs, Treasurer (2015–present)
- Alexi Giannoulias, Secretary of State (2023–present)
- Susana Mendoza, Comptroller (2016–present)
- Kwame Raoul, Attorney General (2019–present)
- Juliana Stratton, lieutenant governor (2019–present)

State legislators

- 5 state senators
- 8 state representatives

Organizations

- Council for a Livable World
- Democratic Majority for Israel
- Humane Society Legislative Fund
- J Street PAC
- Joint Action Committee for Political Affairs
- League of Conservation Voters
- National Organization for Women PAC (post-primary)
- Natural Resources Defense Council
- Sierra Club

Labor unions

- AFSCME Council 31
- Chicago Federation of Labor
- Illinois AFL-CIO
- IUOE Local 150
- National Education Association
- Teamsters Joint Council 25
- United Auto Workers Region 4 and Local 1268

Newspapers

- Chicago Tribune (Democratic primary only)
- Daily Herald (Democratic primary only)
Qasim Rashid

State legislators

- Rachel Ventura, state senator and candidate for this district in 2020

Organizations

- Independent Voters of Illinois-Independent Precinct Organization
- Peace Action

Labor unions

- American Postal Workers Union Locals 604 and 605
- ~~United Auto Workers Region 4~~ (switched endorsement to Foster)

==== Fundraising ====
Campaign finance reports as of February 28, 2024
Candidate	Raised	Spent	Cash on hand
Bill Foster (D)	$1,657,726	$805,130	$1,657,712
Qasim Rashid (D)	$865,695	$772,468	$93,226
Source: Federal Election Commission

=== Results ===
Results by county: Foster—80–90% Foster—70–80% Foster—60–70%

Democratic primary results
Party	Candidate	Votes	%
Democratic	Bill Foster (incumbent)	35,159	76.6
Democratic	Qasim Rashid	10,754	23.4
Total votes		45,913	100.0

=== Republican primary ===
==== Nominee ====
- Jerry Evans, music school founder and candidate for this district in 2022

==== Eliminated in primary ====
- Susan Hathaway-Altman, businesswoman and candidate for this district in 2022
- Kent Mercado, podiatrist and attorney

==== Endorsements ====
Susan Hathaway-Altman

State legislators

- Gary Daugherty, former state representative from the 66th district (2021)
- Don DeWitte, state senator from the 33rd district (2018–present)
- Dave Syverson, state senator from the 35th district (2013–present)
Kent Mercado

Newspapers

- Chicago Tribune (Republican primary only)
- Daily Herald (Republican primary only)

==== Fundraising ====
Campaign finance reports as of February 28, 2024
Candidate	Raised	Spent	Cash on hand
Jerry Evans (R)	$224,234 (Note: $5,000 of this total was self-funded by Evans)	$161,620	$62,613
Susan Hathaway-Altman (R)	$41,109 (Note: $33,920 of this total was self-funded by Hathaway-Altman)	$16,504	$733
Kent Mercado (R)	$68,517 (Note: $45,020 of this total was self-funded by Mercado)	$67,795	$722
Source: Federal Election Commission

==== Forum ====
2024 Illinois's 11th congressional district republican primary candidate forum
No.	Date	Host	Moderator	Link	Republican	Republican	Republican
Key: P Participant A Absent N Not invited I Invited W Withdrawn							
Key: P Participant A Absent N Not invited I Invited W Withdrawn					Jerry Evans	Susan Hathaway-Altman	Kent Mercado
1	Jan. 20, 2024	League of Women Voters of Naperville	Barb Laimans		P	P	P

==== Results ====
Results by county: Evans—50–60% Evans—40–50%

Republican primary results
Party	Candidate	Votes	%
Republican	Jerry Evans	17,814	50.7
Republican	Susan Hathaway-Altman	13,032	37.1
Republican	Kent Mercado	4,312	12.3
Total votes		35,158	100.0

=== General election ===
==== Predictions ====
Source	Ranking	As of
The Cook Political Report	Solid D	February 2, 2023
Inside Elections	Solid D	March 10, 2023
Sabato's Crystal Ball	Safe D	February 7, 2024
Elections Daily	Safe D	June 8, 2023
CNalysis	Solid D	November 16, 2023

==== Polling ====
Poll source	Date(s) administered	Sample size (Note: Key: A – all adults RV – registered voters LV – likely voters V – unclear)	Margin of error	Bill Foster (D)	Jerry Evans (R)	Undecided
Cygnal (R) (Note: Poll sponsored by Evans's campaign)	July 2–3, 2024	309 (LV)	± 5.55%	41%	34%	25%

Hypothetical polling

Generic Democrat vs. generic Republican

Poll source	Date(s) administered	Sample size	Margin of error	Generic Democrat	Generic Republican	Undecided
Cygnal (R)	July 2–3, 2024	309 (LV)	± 5.55%	45%	42%	13%

==== Results ====
2024 Illinois's 11th congressional district election
Party	Candidate	Votes	%
Democratic	Bill Foster	199,825	55.5
Republican	Jerry Evans	159,630	44.4
Independent	Anna Schiefelbein (write-in)	229	0.1
Total votes		359,684	100.0
Democratic hold			

== District 12 ==
2024 Illinois's 12th congressional district election
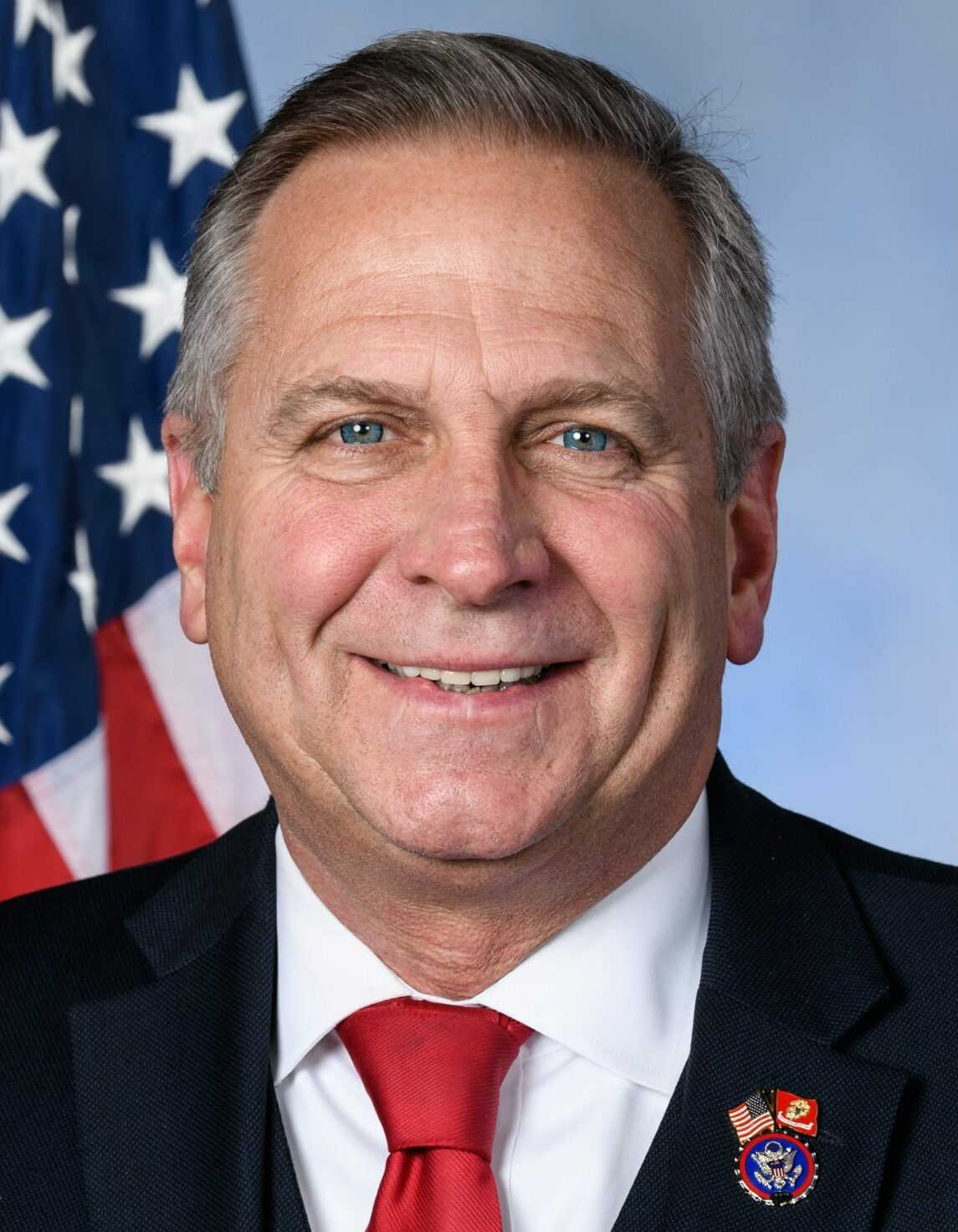

Nominee	Mike Bost	Brian Roberts
Party	Republican	Democratic
Popular vote	272,754	94,875
Percentage	74.2%	25.8%
- County results Bost: 50–60% 60–70% 70–80% 80–90%
U.S. Representative before election
Mike Bost
Republican
Elected U.S. Representative
Mike Bost
Republican

The 12th district is based in southern Illinois, taking in the southeastern St. Louis exurbs. It includes Carbondale, Centralia, Marion, and O'Fallon. The incumbent was Republican Mike Bost, who was re-elected with 75.0% of the vote in 2022.

=== Republican primary ===
==== Nominee ====
- Mike Bost, incumbent U.S. representative

==== Eliminated in primary ====
- Darren Bailey, former state senator and nominee for governor in 2022

==== Endorsements ====
Darren Bailey

U.S. representatives

- Matt Gaetz, U.S. representative from FL-01 (2017–2024)
- Mary Miller, U.S. representative from IL-15 (2021–present)
Mike Bost

Executive branch officials

- Donald Trump, 45th president of the United States

U.S. representatives

- Ronny Jackson, U.S. representative from TX-13 (2021–present)
- Mike Johnson, Speaker of the House (2023–present)
- Max Miller, U.S. representative from OH-07 (2023–present)
- Elise Stefanik, U.S. representative from New York's 21st congressional district (2015–present) and Chair of the House Republican Conference

Former U.S. representatives

- Kevin McCarthy, U.S. representative from CA-20 (2007–2023) and former Speaker of the House (2023)

Organizations

- AIPAC
- BIPAC
- National Federation of Independent Business
- National Rifle Association Political Victory Fund
- National Right to Life Committee
- Pro-Israel America
- United States Chamber of Commerce

Labor unions

- Illinois Fraternal Order of Police
- International Association of Fire Fighters
- IUOE Local 150

Newspapers

- Chicago Tribune (Republican primary only)

==== Polling ====
Poll source	Date(s) administered	Sample size	Margin of error	Darren Bailey	Mike Bost	Undecided
M3 Strategies (R)	March 2–4, 2024	473 (LV)	± 4.48%	39%	45%	16%
Cor Strategies (R)	July 5–8, 2023	661 (RV)	± 3.8%	37%	43%	21%

==== Fundraising ====
Campaign finance reports as of February 28, 2024
Candidate	Raised	Spent	Cash on hand
Darren Bailey (R)	$504,418 (Note: $110,000 of this total was self-funded by Bailey)	$400,744	$103,674
Mike Bost (R)	$2,181,064	$2,274,964	$295,970
Source: Federal Election Commission

=== Results ===
Results by county: Bost—80–90% Bost—70–80% Bost—60–70% Bost—50–60% Bailey—50–60% Bailey—60–70% Bailey—70–80% Bailey—80–90%

Bost's performance in the primary was the worst he had performed in his career, receiving just over 51% of the vote and winning by just 2.8%. This was also his closest election since 2018.

Republican primary results
Party	Candidate	Votes	%
Republican	Mike Bost (incumbent)	48,770	51.4
Republican	Darren Bailey	46,035	48.6
Total votes		94,805	100.0

=== Democratic primary ===
==== Nominee ====
- Brian Roberts, attorney

==== Eliminated in primary ====
- Preston Nelson, entrepreneur and perennial candidate

==== Withdrawn ====
- Joshua Qualls, pharmaceutical delivery contractor and candidate for this district in 2022

==== Endorsements ====
Brian Roberts

Labor unions

- Illinois AFL-CIO
- International Brotherhood of Teamsters Joint Council 25

=== Results ===
Results by county: Roberts—70–80% Roberts—60–70% Roberts—50–60% Nelson—50–60% Nelson—60–70%

Democratic primary results
Party	Candidate	Votes	%
Democratic	Brian Roberts	10,775	60.1
Democratic	Preston Nelson	7,151	39.9
Total votes		17,926	100.0

=== General election ===
==== Predictions ====
Source	Ranking	As of
The Cook Political Report	Solid R	February 2, 2023
Inside Elections	Solid R	March 10, 2023
Sabato's Crystal Ball	Safe R	February 7, 2024
Elections Daily	Safe R	June 8, 2023
CNalysis	Solid R	November 16, 2023

==== Results ====
2024 Illinois's 12th congressional district election
Party	Candidate	Votes	%
Republican	Mike Bost (incumbent)	272,754	74.2
Democratic	Brian Roberts	94,875	25.8
Total votes		367,629	100.0
Republican hold			

== District 13 ==
2024 Illinois's 13th congressional district election
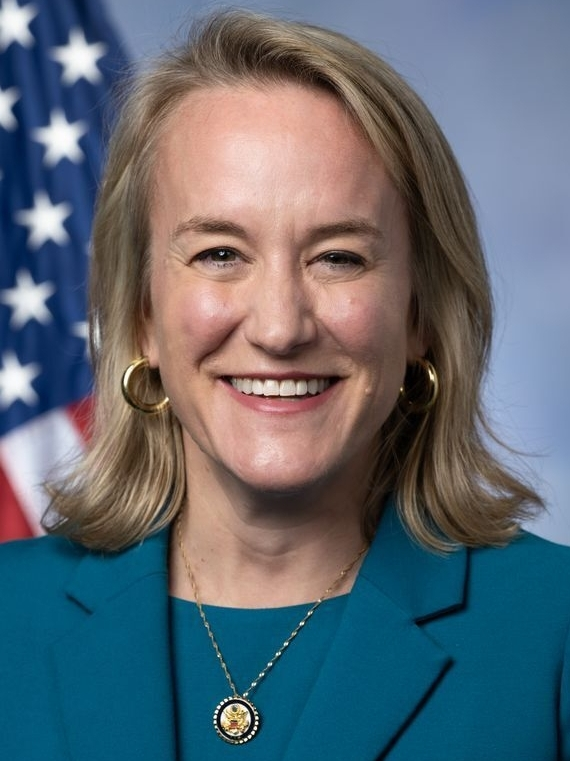

Nominee	Nikki Budzinski	Joshua Loyd
Party	Democratic	Republican
Popular vote	191,339	137,917
Percentage	58.1%	41.9%
- County results Budzinski: 50–60% 60–70% 70–80% Loyd: 50–60% 60–70%
U.S. Representative before election
Nikki Budzinski
Democratic
Elected U.S. Representative
Nikki Budzinski
Democratic

The 13th district is based in central Illinois, stretching from the Champaign–Urbana metropolitan area to the eastern St. Louis suburbs and taking in Decatur as well as the state capital, Springfield. The incumbent was Democrat Nikki Budzinski, who was elected with 56.6% of the vote in 2022.

=== Democratic primary ===
==== Nominee ====
- Nikki Budzinski, incumbent U.S. representative

==== Endorsements ====
Nikki Budzinski

U.S representatives

- Gabby Giffords, former AZ-08 (2007–2012)

Statewide officials

- Gretchen Whitmer, governor of Michigan (2019–present)

Organizations

- Democratic Majority for Israel
- EMILY's List
- Everytown for Gun Safety Action Fund
- Giffords
- Humane Society Legislative Fund
- J Street PAC
- Jewish Democratic Council of America
- League of Conservation Voters
- NARAL Pro-Choice America
- National Women's Political Caucus
- Natural Resources Defense Council
- Planned Parenthood Action Fund

Labor unions

- Association of Flight Attendants
- Illinois AFL-CIO
- International Brotherhood of Teamsters Joint Council 25
- IUOE Local 150
- United Auto Workers

==== Fundraising ====
Campaign finance reports as of February 28, 2024
Candidate	Raised	Spent	Cash on hand
Nikki Budzinski (D)	$2,229,558	$840,410	$1,430,890
Source: Federal Election Commission

=== Results ===
Democratic primary results
Party	Candidate	Votes	%
Democratic	Nikki Budzinski (incumbent)	32,314	100.0
Total votes		32,314	100.0

=== Republican primary ===
==== Nominee ====
- Joshua Loyd, U.S. Army veteran

==== Eliminated in primary ====
- Thomas Clatterbuck, law student

==== Fundraising ====
Campaign finance reports as of February 28, 2024
Candidate	Raised	Spent	Cash on hand
Thomas Clatterbuck (R)	$26,587	$23,590	$2,997
Joshua Loyd (R)	$18,566	$16,029	$1,767
Source: Federal Election Commission

=== Results ===
Results by county: Loyd—50–60%

Republican primary results
Party	Candidate	Votes	%
Republican	Joshua Loyd	15,633	55.9
Republican	Thomas Clatterbuck	12,320	44.1
Total votes		27,953	100.0

=== General election ===
==== Predictions ====
Source	Ranking	As of
The Cook Political Report	Solid D	February 2, 2023
Inside Elections	Solid D	March 10, 2023
Sabato's Crystal Ball	Safe D	February 7, 2024
Elections Daily	Safe D	June 8, 2023
CNalysis	Solid D	November 16, 2023

==== Results ====
2024 Illinois's 13th congressional district election
Party	Candidate	Votes	%
Democratic	Nikki Budzinski (incumbent)	191,339	58.1
Republican	Joshua Loyd	137,917	41.9
Green	Chibuihe Asonye (write-in)	244	0.1
Total votes		329,500	100.0
Democratic hold			

== District 14 ==
2024 Illinois's 14th congressional district election
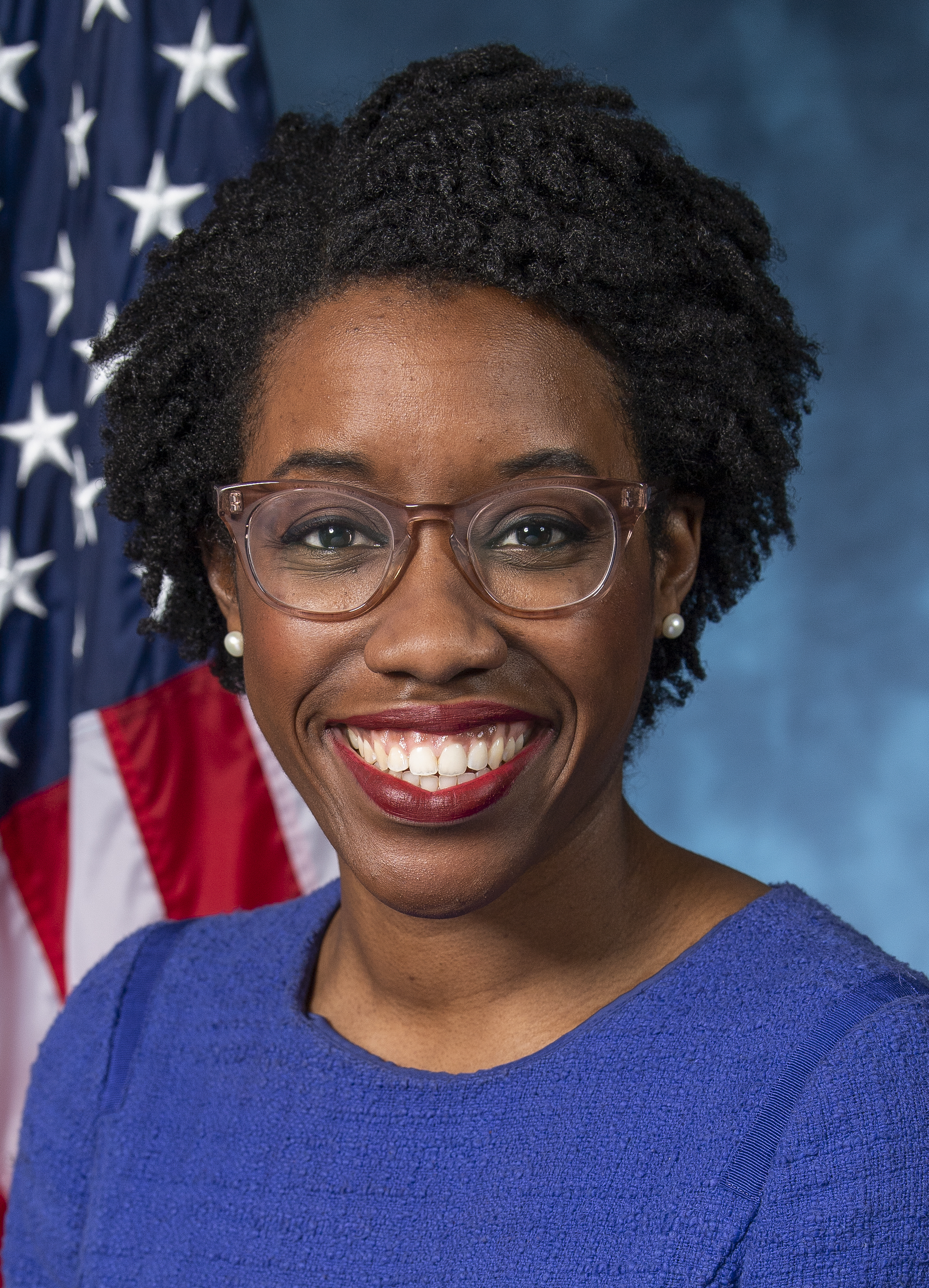

Nominee	Lauren Underwood	James Marter
Party	Democratic	Republican
Popular vote	183,446	149,464
Percentage	55.1%	44.9%
- County results Underwood: 50–60% Marter: 50–60%
U.S. Representative before election
Lauren Underwood
Democratic
Elected U.S. Representative
Lauren Underwood
Democratic

The 14th district is based in the western exurbs of Chicago, including all or parts of Aurora, DeKalb, Granville, Joliet, Montgomery, Naperville, Oswego, Ottawa, Peru, Plainfield, Shorewood, Spring Valley, Sugar Grove, and Sycamore. The incumbent was Democrat Lauren Underwood, who was re-elected with 54.2% of the vote in 2022.

=== Democratic primary ===
==== Nominee ====
- Lauren Underwood, incumbent U.S. representative

==== Endorsements ====
Lauren Underwood

U.S representatives

- Seth Moulton, U.S. representative from Massachusetts's 6th congressional district (2015–present)

Statewide officials

- Gretchen Whitmer, governor of Michigan (2019-present)

Organizations

- 314 Action
- EMILY's List
- End Citizens United
- Feminist Majority PAC
- Giffords
- Humane Society Legislative Fund
- Joint Action Committee for Political Affairs
- League of Conservation Voters
- National Organization for Women PAC
- National Women's Political Caucus
- Natural Resources Defense Council
- Planned Parenthood Action Fund
- Population Connection Action Fund
- Sierra Club

Labor unions

- Illinois AFL-CIO
- International Brotherhood of Teamsters Joint Council 25
- IUOE Local 150
- National Education Association
- United Auto Workers

=== Fundraising ===
Campaign finance reports as of February 28, 2024
Candidate	Raised	Spent	Cash on hand
Lauren Underwood (D)	$2,082,745	$1,236,159	$1,633,672
Source: Federal Election Commission

=== Results ===
Democratic primary results
Party	Candidate	Votes	%
Democratic	Lauren Underwood (incumbent)	32,400	100.0
Total votes		32,400	100.0

=== Republican primary ===
==== Nominee ====
- James Marter, Oswego Public Library Board member, chair of the Kendall County Republican Party, and perennial candidate

==== Eliminated in primary ====
- Charlie Kim, businessman

==== Disqualified ====
- Krystal Dorey, interior decorating firm CEO

==== Endorsements ====
Declined to endorse

Newspapers

- Daily Herald

=== Fundraising ===
Campaign finance reports as of February 28, 2024
Candidate	Raised	Spent	Cash on hand
Charlie Kim (R) (Note: Did not file for pre-primary deadline)	$75,730 (Note: $75,730 of this total was self-funded by Kim)	$16,981	$59,071
James Marter (R)	$81,097 (Note: $1,089 of this total was self-funded by Marter)	$62,394	$18,943
Source: Federal Election Commission

=== Results ===
Republican primary results
Party	Candidate	Votes	%
Republican	James Marter	24,828	79.0
Republican	Charlie Kim	6,571	21.0
Total votes		31,399	100.0

=== General election ===
==== Predictions ====
Source	Ranking	As of
The Cook Political Report	Solid D	February 2, 2023
Inside Elections	Solid D	March 10, 2023
Sabato's Crystal Ball	Safe D	February 7, 2024
Elections Daily	Safe D	June 8, 2023
CNalysis	Solid D	November 16, 2023

==== Results ====
2024 Illinois's 14th congressional district election
Party	Candidate	Votes	%
Democratic	Lauren Underwood (incumbent)	183,446	55.1
Republican	James Marter	149,464	44.9
Write-in		19	0.0
Total votes		332,929	100.0
Democratic hold			

== District 15 ==
2024 Illinois's 15th congressional district election
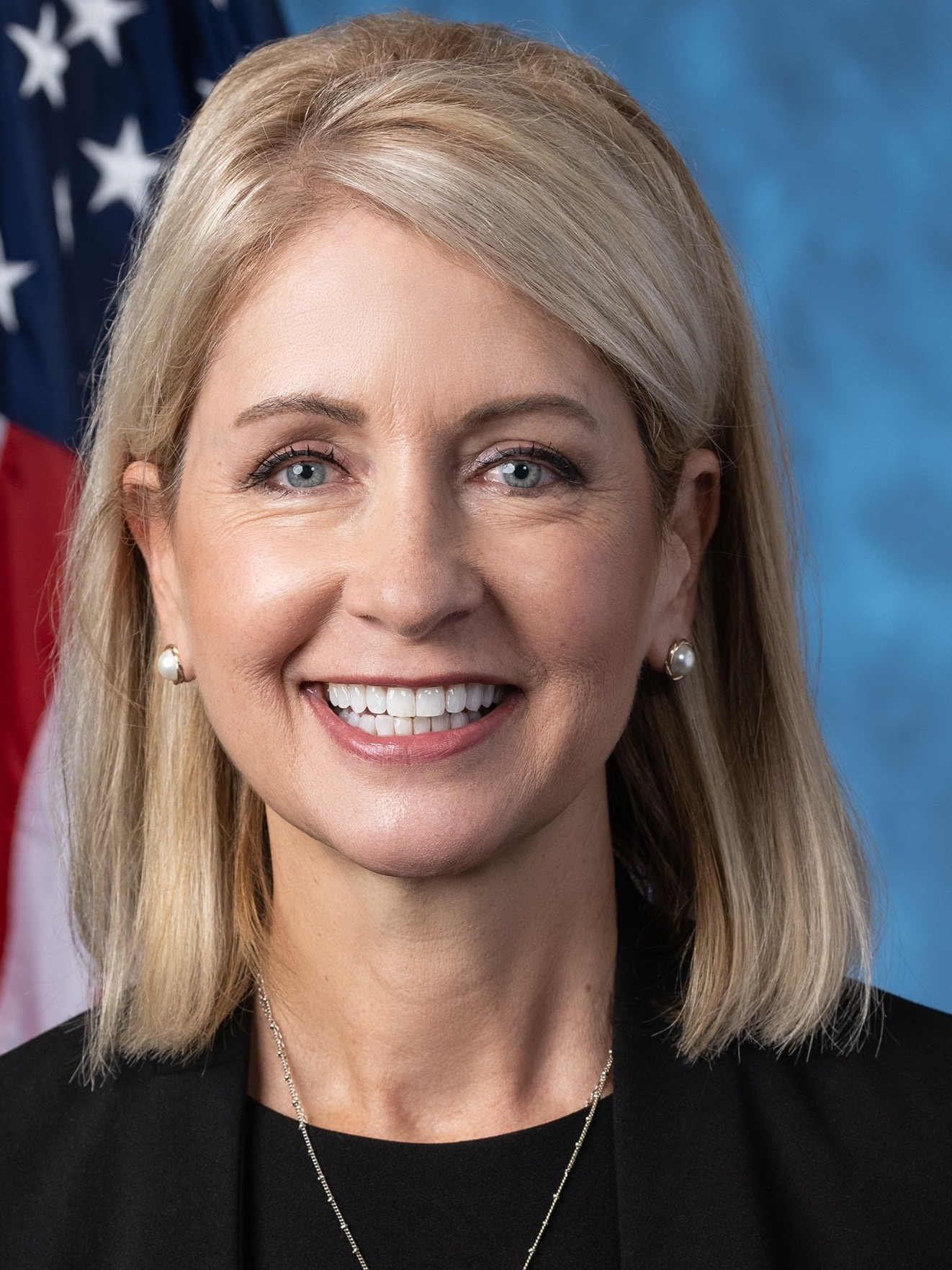
Nominee	Mary Miller
Party	Republican
Popular vote	308,825
Percentage	99.5%
- County results Miller: Uncontested
U.S. Representative before election
Mary Miller
Republican
Elected U.S. Representative
Mary Miller
Republican

The 15th district is based in the rural areas of central Illinois, stretching from the Champaign–Urbana metropolitan area to the eastern St. Louis suburbs and taking in Quincy. The incumbent was Republican Mary Miller, who was re-elected with 71.1% of the vote in 2022.

As no Democrat filed to run, Miller ran unopposed.

=== Republican primary ===
==== Nominee ====
- Mary Miller, incumbent U.S. representative

==== Fundraising ====
Campaign finance reports as of February 28, 2024
Candidate	Raised	Spent	Cash on hand
Mary Miller (R)	$947,846	$777,225	$480,606
Source: Federal Election Commission

=== Results ===
Republican primary results
Party	Candidate	Votes	%
Republican	Mary Miller (incumbent)	65,205	100.0
Total votes		65,205	100.0

=== General election ===
==== Predictions ====
Source	Ranking	As of
The Cook Political Report	Solid R	February 2, 2023
Inside Elections	Solid R	March 10, 2023
Sabato's Crystal Ball	Safe R	February 7, 2024
Elections Daily	Safe R	June 8, 2023
CNalysis	Solid R	November 16, 2023

==== Results ====
2024 Illinois's 15th congressional district election
Party	Candidate	Votes	%
Republican	Mary Miller (incumbent)	308,825	99.5
Democratic	William Bonnett (write-in)	1,409	0.5
Total votes		310,234	100.0
Republican hold			

== District 16 ==
2024 Illinois's 16th congressional district election
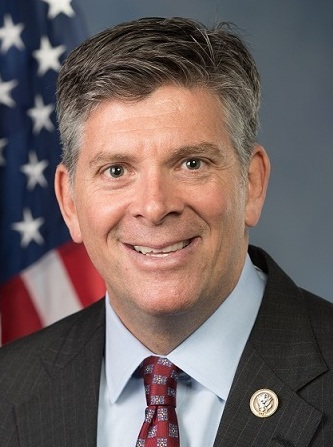
Nominee	Darin LaHood
Party	Republican
Popular vote	310,925
Percentage	99.9%
- County results LaHood: Uncontested
U.S. Representative before election
Darin LaHood
Republican
Elected U.S. Representative
Darin LaHood
Republican

The 16th district is based in the rural areas of northern Illinois. The incumbent was Republican Darin LaHood, who was re-elected with 66.3% of the vote in 2022.

As no Democrat filed to run, LaHood ran unopposed.

=== Republican primary ===
==== Nominee ====
- Darin LaHood, incumbent U.S. representative

==== Endorsements ====
Darin LaHood

Labor unions

- IUOE Local 150

==== Fundraising ====
Campaign finance reports as of February 28, 2024
Candidate	Raised	Spent	Cash on hand
Darin LaHood (R)	$2,087,381	$1,144,483	$4,907,586
Source: Federal Election Commission

=== Results ===
Republican primary results
Party	Candidate	Votes	%
Republican	Darin LaHood (incumbent)	59,324	100.0
Total votes		59,324	100.0

=== General election ===
==== Predictions ====
Source	Ranking	As of
The Cook Political Report	Solid R	February 2, 2023
Inside Elections	Solid R	March 10, 2023
Sabato's Crystal Ball	Safe R	February 7, 2024
Elections Daily	Safe R	June 8, 2023
CNalysis	Solid R	November 16, 2023

==== Results ====
2024 Illinois's 16th congressional district election
Party	Candidate	Votes	%
Republican	Darin LaHood (incumbent)	310,925	99.9
Green	Scott Summers (write-in)	183	0.1
Total votes		311,108	100.0
Republican hold			

== District 17 ==
2024 Illinois's 17th congressional district election
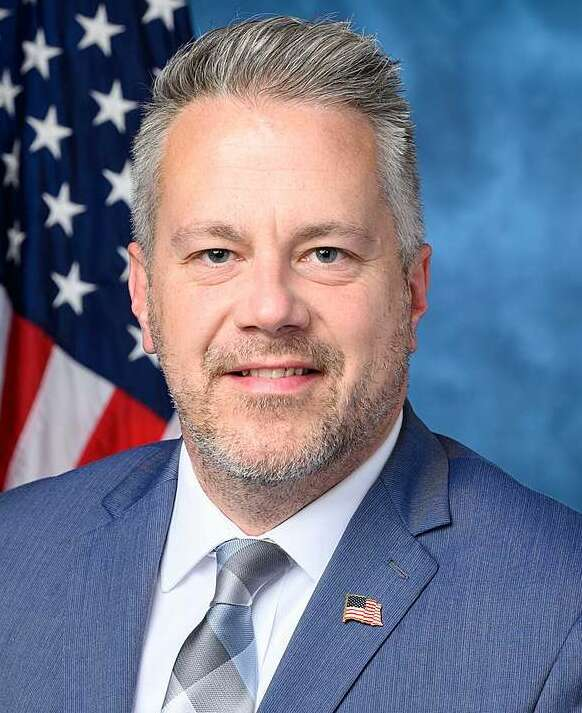

Nominee	Eric Sorensen	Joseph McGraw
Party	Democratic	Republican
Popular vote	170,261	142,567
Percentage	54.4%	45.6%
- County results Sorensen: 50–60% 60–70% McGraw: 50–60% 60–70% 70–80%
U.S. Representative before election
Eric Sorensen
Democratic
Elected U.S. Representative
Eric Sorensen
Democratic

The 17th district is based in north-central Illinois, stretching from Rockford to the Quad Cities metropolitan area to Bloomington, also taking in Peoria. The incumbent was Democrat Eric Sorensen, who was elected with 52.0% of the vote in 2022.

=== Democratic primary ===
==== Nominee ====
- Eric Sorensen, incumbent U.S. representative

==== Endorsements ====
Eric Sorensen

U.S representatives

- Gabby Giffords, former U.S. representative from Arizona's 8th congressional district (2007–2012)

Statewide officials

- Gretchen Whitmer, governor of Michigan (2019–present)

Individuals

- Kelley Robinson, president of Human Rights Campaign

Organizations

- 314 Action
- AIPAC
- Bend the Arc
- Brady PAC
- Council for a Livable World
- Democratic Majority for Israel
- End Citizens United
- Everytown for Gun Safety Action Fund
- Giffords
- Human Rights Campaign
- Humane Society Legislative Fund
- J Street PAC
- Jewish Democratic Council of America
- Joint Action Committee for Political Affairs
- League of Conservation Voters
- LGBTQ Victory Fund
- NARAL Pro-Choice America
- Natural Resources Defense Council
- Planned Parenthood Action Fund
- Population Connection Action Fund

Labor unions

- Illinois AFL-CIO
- International Brotherhood of Teamsters Joint Council 25
- IUOE Local 150
- National Education Association
- United Auto Workers

==== Fundraising ====
Campaign finance reports as of February 28, 2024
Candidate	Raised	Spent	Cash on hand
Eric Sorensen (D)	$2,356,426	$635,654	$1,761,699
Source: Federal Election Commission

=== Results ===
Democratic primary results
Party	Candidate	Votes	%
Democratic	Eric Sorensen (incumbent)	28,533	100.0
Total votes		28,533	100.0

=== Republican primary ===
==== Nominee ====
- Joseph McGraw, retired circuit court judge

==== Eliminated in primary ====
- Scott Crowl, farmer and former president of AFSCME Local 1232

==== Withdrawn ====
- Ray Estrada, refugee aid nonprofit director

==== Declined ====
- Neil Anderson, state senator from the 36th district (2015–present)
- Dan Brady, former state representative from the 105th district (2001–2023) and nominee for Illinois Secretary of State in 2022 (endorsed McGraw)
- Esther Joy King, attorney and nominee for this district in 2020 and 2022
- Tony McCombie, Minority Leader of the Illinois House of Representatives (2023–present) from the 71st district (2017–present) (endorsed McGraw)
- Ryan Spain, state representative from the 73rd district (2017–present)

==== Endorsements ====
Joe McGraw

U.S. representatives

- Darin LaHood, IL-16 (2015–present)
- Steve Scalise, LA-01 (2008–present)
- Elise Stefanik, NY-21 (2015–present)

State legislators

- 11 state legislators

Organizations

- Americans for Prosperity (post-primary)
- Congressional Leadership Fund (post-primary)
- National Republican Congressional Committee

Newspapers

- Chicago Tribune (Republican primary only)

==== Fundraising ====
Campaign finance reports as of February 28, 2024
Candidate	Raised	Spent	Cash on hand
Scott Crowl (R)	$98,382 (Note: $90,989 of this total was self-funded by Crowl)	$91,039	$7,343
Joe McGraw (R)	$333,628	$107,464	$226,164
Source: Federal Election Commission

=== Results ===
Republican primary results
Party	Candidate	Votes	%
Republican	Joseph McGraw	20,223	67.6
Republican	Scott Crowl	9,696	32.4
Total votes		29,919	100.0

=== General election ===
==== Predictions ====
Source	Ranking	As of
The Cook Political Report	Likely D	October 4, 2024
Inside Elections	Likely D	September 26, 2024
Sabato's Crystal Ball	Likely D	November 4, 2024
Elections Daily	Likely D	November 4, 2024
CNalysis	Likely D	November 16, 2023

==== Polling ====
Poll source	Date(s) administered	Sample size	Margin of error	Eric Sorensen (D)	Joseph McGraw (R)	Undecided
M3 Strategies	November 1–3, 2024	753 (LV)	± 3.57%	52%	47%	1% (Note: "Refused" with 1%)
1892 Strategies (R)	?	400 (LV)	± 4.9%	44%	35%	20%

==== Results ====
2024 Illinois's 17th congressional district election
Party	Candidate	Votes	%
Democratic	Eric Sorensen (incumbent)	170,261	54.4
Republican	Joseph McGraw	142,567	45.6
Total votes		312,828	100.0
Democratic hold			

== Notes ==
Partisan clients
