= Charles A. Hartke =

American politician (1944–2025)

Charles A. Hartke (May 7, 1944 – April 13, 2025) was an American politician who served as Director of the Illinois Department of Agriculture and as a Democratic member of the Illinois House of Representatives.

== Life and career ==
Hartke was born in Effingham, Illinois May 7, 1944. He served in the United States Army from 1966 to 1968, including a tour of duty in Vietnam. He served on the Effingham County Board from 1971 to 1974, as Effingham County Democratic Central Committee chairman from 1978 to 1985 and as president of the Effingham County Pork Producers for a period of time. He was appointed to the Illinois House of Representatives February 11, 1985, to replace Richard H. Brummer, who was appointed to a judgeship. In 1997, Hartke was appointed Assistant Majority Leader. He was an elector pledged to Al Gore during the 2000 presidential election. In 2003, Rod Blagojevich appointed him Director of the Illinois Department of Agriculture. William J. Grunloh was appointed to succeed him in the Illinois House of Representatives. He officially stepped down from the position February 29, 2008.

Hartke died on April 13, 2025, at the age of 80.
