= Illinois's 5th House of Representatives district =

American legislative district

Illinois's 5th State House of Representatives district
Representative
Lamont Robinson; D–Chicago
since 2019
- Demographics: 32.8% White; 48.4% Black; 5.3% Hispanic; 9.6% Asian; 0.1% Native American; 0.0% Hawaiian/Pacific Islander; 0.5% Other; 3.3% Multiracial
- Population (2020): 130,516
- Created: 1983–present 1849–1873, 1957–1973

Illinois's 5th House of Representatives district is a Representative district within the Illinois House of Representatives located in Cook County, Illinois. It has been represented by Democrat Lamont Robinson since January 2, 2019. The district was previously represented by Democratic Lieutenant Governor Juliana Stratton from 2017 to 2019.

The district covers parts of Chicago, and of Chicago's neighborhoods, it covers parts of Armour Square, Avalon Park, Douglas, Englewood, Fuller Park, Grand Boulevard, Greater Grand Crossing, Loop, Near North Side, Near South Side, South Shore, Washington Park, and Woodlawn.

== Representative district history ==
Prior to the ratification of the 1848 Illinois Constitution, counties (or two or more counties) were designated a certain number of Senators and Representatives. With the ratification of the 1848 Illinois Constitution, Legislative and Representative districts were numbered and called by name. Each district was still assigned a certain number of Senators and Representatives. After the passage of the 1872 Apportionment, only Legislative districts were drawn with Representatives elected cumulatively. The 1954 amendment to the 1870 Illinois Constitution established Representative districts as separate from Legislative districts (with representatives still elected cumulatively). The boundaries of Representative and Legislative districts would differ. After the United States Supreme Court ruled in Reynolds v. Sims (1964) that "both houses of state legislatures must be apportioned according to districts of equal population," new districts were redrawn for the Illinois Senate and Illinois House of Representatives. While the Legislative districts were redrawn, the Governor and General Assembly failed to agree on Representative district boundaries. Under the 1954 amendment, "a 10-man bipartisan commission appointed by the governor from recommendations made by both parties" were directed to redraw boundaries but failed to do so in 1963. Because of this failure, and with no district boundaries redrawn, all Representative districts were temporarily merged into one at-large district with 177 representatives (the total number of representatives at the time). The 1964 Illinois House election had several candidates running for all 177 seats throughout the state. In 1965, the Representative districts were redrawn by the Illinois Legislative Reapportionment Commission and elections held in 1966 were done with separate districts. With the 1971 Apportionment (and adoption of the 1970 Illinois Constitution), Representative districts were abolished and representatives were once again elected cumulatively per Legislative district. After the passage of the Cutback Amendment in 1980, the number of Representatives was reduced from 177 to 118 with Representative districts re-established and now electing a single representative.

== Prominent representatives ==
Representative	Notes
John A. Logan	Elected to the U.S. House of Representatives from Illinois's 9th congressional district (1859 – 1862); Served as a general for the Union Army in the Civil War (1862 – 1865); Elected to the U.S. House of Representatives from Illinois's at-large congressional district (1867 – 1871); Elected to the U.S. Senate from Illinois (1871 – 1877); Elected back to the U.S. Senate from Illinois (1879 – 1886); Republican nominee for Vice-President during the 1884 United States presidential election
Juliana Stratton	Elected as the 48th Lieutenant Governor of Illinois (2019 – present)

== List of representatives ==
=== 1849 – 1873 ===
Representative	Party	Years (Note: From 1870 to 1970, the GA met for a new session on the Wednesday after the first Monday of January.)	General Assembly (GA)	Electoral history	Counties represented
5th Representative district established with 1848 Illinois Constitution.
Richard A. Bradley	Democratic	January 1, 1849 – January 6, 1851	16th	Elected back to the state House in 1848; Was not re-elected in 1850.	Franklin; Jackson
Thomas M. Sans	Unknown	January 6, 1851 – January 3, 1853	17th	Elected in 1850; Was not re-elected in 1852	Franklin; Jackson
John A. Logan	Democratic	January 3, 1853 – January 1, 1855	18th	Elected in 1852; Was not re-elected in 1854	Franklin; Jackson
Thomas M. Sams	Democratic	January 1, 1855 – January 5, 1857	19th	Elected in 1854; Was not re-elected in 1856	Franklin; Jackson
John A. Logan	Democratic	January 5, 1857 – January 3, 1859	20th	Elected back in 1856; Was not re-elected in 1858	Franklin; Jackson
James Hampton	Democratic	January 3, 1859 – January 7, 1861	21st	Elected in 1858; Was not re-elected in 1860	Franklin; Jackson
Peter Keifer	Unknown	January 7, 1861 – January 5, 1863	22nd	Elected in 1860; Was not re-elected in 1862	Franklin; Jackson
Henry N. Williams	Unknown	January 5, 1863 – January 2, 1865	23rd	Elected in 1862; Was not re-elected in 1864	Franklin; Jefferson
John Ward	Democratic	January 2, 1865 – January 7, 1867	24th	Elected in 1864; Was not re-elected in 1866	Franklin; Jefferson
Noah Johnson	Unknown	January 7, 1867 – January 4, 1869	25th	Elected in 1866; Was not re-elected in 1868	Franklin; Jefferson
C. C. M. V. B. Payne	Democratic	January 4, 1869 – January 4, 1871	26th	Elected in 1868; Was not re-elected in 1870	Franklin; Jefferson
William C. Rich	Democratic	January 4, 1871 – January 8, 1873	27th	Elected in 1870; Was not re-elected in 1872	Union
District abolished with 1872 Reapportionment as 3 Representatives were now elected cumulatively from Legislative districts.

=== 1957 – 1973 ===
Representative	Party	Party Control	Years (Note: Since 1970, the GA meets on the second Wednesday of January for a new session.)	General Assembly (GA)	Electoral history	Counties represented
District re-established in 1957.
Elmer W. Conti	Republican	2 Republicans; 1 Democrat	January 9, 1957 – January 9, 1963	70th 71st 72nd	Elected in 1956; Re-elected in 1958; Re-elected in 1960; Retired.	Cook
Harry J. Smith	Republican	2 Republicans; 1 Democrat	January 9, 1957 – January 7, 1959	70th	Elected in 1956; Lost re-election in 1958	Cook
Joseph J. Lelivelt	Democratic	2 Republicans; 1 Democrat	January 9, 1957 – January 9, 1963	70th 71st 72nd	Redistricted from the 7th Legislative district and re-elected in 1956; Re-elected in 1958; Re-elected in 1960; Nominated to run in the 5th district but ran for Superior Court of Cook County nomination and lost in 1962.	Cook
Joseph P. Sandro	Democratic	2 Democrats; 1 Republican	January 7, 1959 – January 4, 1961	71st	Elected in 1958; Lost re-election in 1960	Cook
William D. Walsh	Republican	2 Republicans; 1 Democrat	January 4, 1961 – January 6, 1965	72nd 73rd	Elected in 1960; Re-elected in 1962; Redistricted and re-elected to the At-large district in 1964.	Cook
Richard L. LoDestro	Republican	2 Republicans; 1 Democrat	January 9, 1963 – January 6, 1965	73rd	Elected in 1962; Ran in the At-large election and lost re-election in 1964.	Cook
Leo Bartoline	Democratic	2 Republicans; 1 Democrat	January 9, 1963 – ???	73rd	Elected in 1962; Died of a heart attack.	Cook
1 Vacancy		2 Republicans	??? – January 6, 1965	73rd	Vacancy left unfilled for remainder of the 73rd GA.	Cook
The district was temporarily abolished from 1965 to 1967 due to the Redistricting Commission in 1963 failing to reach an agreement. An at-large election was held electing 177 Representatives from across the state.
William D. Walsh	Republican	2 Republicans; 1 Democrat	January 4, 1967 – January 10, 1973	75th 76th 77th	Redistricted from At-large district and re-elected in 1966; Re-elected in 1968; Re-elected in 1970; Redistricted to 6th Legislative district and re-elected in 1972.	Cook
Lawrence X. Pusateri	Republican	2 Republicans; 1 Democrat	January 4, 1967 – January 8, 1969	75th	Redistricted from At-large district and re-elected in 1966; Retired.	Cook
Joseph P. McGah	Democratic	2 Republicans; 1 Democrat	January 4, 1967 – January 10, 1973	75th 76th 77th	Elected in 1966; Re-elected in 1968; Re-elected in 1970; Redistricted to 6th Legislative district and re-elected in 1972.	Cook
Ronald K. Hoffman	Republican	2 Republicans; 1 Democrat	January 8, 1969 – January 10, 1973	76th 77th	Elected in 1968; Re-elected in 1970; Redistricted to 6th Legislative district and re-elected in 1972.	Cook
District abolished with 1971 Reapportionment as Representatives were once again elected from Legislative districts.

=== 1983 – present ===
Representative	Party	Years	General Assembly (GA)	Electoral history	Counties represented
District re-established with representatives now elected one per district with the passage of the Cutback Amendment
Ellis B. Levin	Democratic	January 12, 1983 – January 13, 1993	83rd 84th 85th 86th 87th	Redistricted from 12th Legislative district and re-elected in 1982; Re-elected in 1984; Re-elected in 1986; Re-elected in 1988; Re-elected in 1990; Redistricted to the 12th Representative district and re-elected in 1992.	Cook
Lovana Jones	Democratic	January 13, 1993 – 2002	88th 89th 90th 91st	Redistricted from 23rd Representative district and re-elected in 1992; Re-elected in 1994; Re-elected in 1996; Re-elected in 1998; Re-elected in 2000; Redistricted to 26th Representative district and re-elected in 2002. Resigned from her 5th Representative district seat before the end of the session.	Cook
Lovana Jones	Democratic	January 13, 1993 – 2002	92nd	Redistricted from 23rd Representative district and re-elected in 1992; Re-elected in 1994; Re-elected in 1996; Re-elected in 1998; Re-elected in 2000; Redistricted to 26th Representative district and re-elected in 2002. Resigned from her 5th Representative district seat before the end of the session.	Cook
Vacant		2002 – December 2002	92nd		Cook
Kenneth Dunkin	Democratic	December 2002 – January 11, 2017	92nd	Elected and appointed in 2002; Re-elected in 2004; Re-elected in 2006; Re-elected in 2008; Re-elected in 2010; Re-elected in 2012; Re-elected in 2014; Lost renomination in 2016.	Cook
Kenneth Dunkin	Democratic	December 2002 – January 11, 2017	93rd 94th 95th 96th 97th 98th 99th	Elected and appointed in 2002; Re-elected in 2004; Re-elected in 2006; Re-elected in 2008; Re-elected in 2010; Re-elected in 2012; Re-elected in 2014; Lost renomination in 2016.	Cook
Juliana Stratton	Democratic	January 11, 2017 – January 9, 2019	100th	Elected in 2016; Nominated for and elected Lieutenant Governor of Illinois in 2018.	Cook
Lamont Robinson	Democratic	January 9, 2019 – present	101st 102nd 103rd	Elected in 2018; Re-elected in 2020; Re-elected in 2022	Cook

== Historic District Boundaries ==
Years	County	Municipalities/Townships	Notes
2023 – present	Cook	Chicago (Armour Square, Avalon Park, Douglas, Englewood, Fuller Park, Grand Boulevard, Greater Grand Crossing, Loop, Near North Side, Near South Side, South Shore, Washington Park, Woodlawn)	
2013 – 2023	Cook	Chicago (Armour Square, Avalon Park, Douglas, Englewood, Fuller Park, Grand Boulevard, Greater Grand Crossing, Loop, Near North Side, Near South Side, South Shore, Washington Park, and Woodlawn)	
2003 – 2013	Cook	Chicago	
1993 – 2003	Cook	Chicago	
1983 – 1993	Cook	Chicago	
1967 – 1973	Cook	Parts of Berwyn Township, parts of Oak Park Township, parts of Proviso Township	
1957 – 1965	Cook	Parts of Leyden Township, parts of Norwood Park Township, parts of Proviso Township	
1871 – 1873	Union	Anna, Bennes, Cobden, Dongola, Jonesboro, Lick Creek, Mason, Preston, South Pass, Toledo, Union Point, Western Saratoga	
1863 – 1871	Franklin; Jefferson	Benton, Blissville, Bussville, Cave, Elkton, Farmington, Farrington, Frankfort (West Frankfort), Greenville, Jefferson, Jordan's Prairie, Little Muddy, Locust Grove, Lynchburg, Moore's Prairie, Mount Vernon, Osage, Pleasant Shade, Portland, Quinceburg, Rome, Spring Garden	
1849 – 1863	Franklin; Jackson	Benton, Bradley, Breesville (Grand Tower), Brownsville, Carbondale, Cave (Greenville), Columbia, De Soto, Fancy Farm, Frankfort (West Frankfort), Grand Tower, Greenville, Little Muddy, Makanda, Mulberry Grove, Murphysboro, Osage, Ovid, Pinus, Pleasant Creek, Pleasant Shade, Portland, Saline, Urbane, Vergennes	

== Electoral history ==
=== 2030 – 2022 ===
2022 Illinois House of Representatives election
Party	Candidate	Votes	%
Democratic	Lamont Robinson (incumbent)	23,847	100.0
Total votes		23,847	100.0

=== 2020 – 2012 ===
2020 Illinois House of Representatives election
Party	Candidate	Votes	%	±%
Democratic	Lamont J. Robinson (incumbent)	43,918	100.0	N/A
Total votes		43,918	100.0	

2018 Illinois House of Representatives election
Party	Candidate	Votes	%	±%
Democratic	Lamont J. Robinson, Jr.	35,388	100.0	N/A
Total votes		35,388	100.0	

2016 Illinois House of Representatives election
Party	Candidate	Votes	%	±%
Democratic	Juliana Stratton	40,747	100.0	+17.36%
Total votes		40,747	100.0	

2016 Illinois House of Representatives Democratic primary
Party	Candidate	Votes	%
Democratic	Juliana Stratton	19,790	68.03
Democratic	Kenneth "Ken" Dunkin (incumbent)	9,300	31.97
Total votes		29,090	100.0

2014 Illinois House of Representatives election
Party	Candidate	Votes	%	±%
Democratic	Kenneth "Ken" Dunkin (incumbent)	22,440	82.64	−17.36%
Republican	Collin Johnson	4715	17.36	N/A
Total votes		27,155	100.0	

2012 Illinois House of Representatives election
Party	Candidate	Votes	%	±%
Democratic	Kenneth "Ken" Dunkin (incumbent)	36,210	100.0	N/A
Total votes		36,210	100.0	

=== 2010 – 2002 ===
2010 Illinois House of Representatives election
Party	Candidate	Votes	%	±%
Democratic	Kenneth "Ken" Dunkin (incumbent)	19,273	100.0	N/A
Total votes		19,273	100.0	

2008 Illinois House of Representatives election
Party	Candidate	Votes	%	±%
Democratic	Kenneth "Ken" Dunkin (incumbent)	30,964	100.0	+13.71%
Total votes		30,964	100.0	

2006 Illinois House of Representatives election
Party	Candidate	Votes	%	±%
Democratic	Kenneth "Ken" Dunkin (incumbent)	17,958	86.29	+3.90%
Republican	Keely Drukala	2,853	13.71	−3.90%
Total votes		20,811	100.0	

2004 Illinois House of Representatives election
Party	Candidate	Votes	%	±%
Democratic	Kenneth "Ken" Dunkin (incumbent)	27,464	82.39	−1.09%
Republican	Robert Vaughn	5,871	17.61	+1.09%
Total votes		33,335	100.0	

2002 Illinois House of Representatives election
Party	Candidate	Votes	%	±%
Democratic	Kenneth "Ken" Dunkin	17,438	83.48	−16.52%
Republican	Christopher "Chris" Wong	3,450	16.52	N/A
Total votes		20,888	100.0	

=== 2000 – 1992 ===
2000 Illinois House of Representatives election
Party	Candidate	Votes	%	±%
Democratic	Lovana S. "Lou" Jones (incumbent)	25,671	100.0	N/A
Total votes		25,671	100.0	

1998 Illinois House of Representatives election
Party	Candidate	Votes	%	±%
Democratic	Lovana S. "Lou" Jones (incumbent)	20,480	100.0	N/A
Total votes		20,480	100.0	

1996 Illinois House of Representatives election
Party	Candidate	Votes	%	±%
Democratic	Lovana S. "Lou" Jones (incumbent)	27,772	100.0	N/A
Total votes		27,772	100.0	

1994 Illinois House of Representatives election
Party	Candidate	Votes	%	±%
Democratic	Lovana S. "Lou" Jones (incumbent)	19,339	100.0	N/A
Total votes		19,339	100.0	

1992 Illinois House of Representatives election
Party	Candidate	Votes	%	±%
Democratic	Lovana S. "Lou" Jones (incumbent)	32,116	100.0	+33.71%
Total votes		32,116	100.0	

=== 1990 – 1982 ===
1990 Illinois House of Representatives election
Party	Candidate	Votes	%	±%
Democratic	Ellis B. Levin (incumbent)	14,081	66.29	−33.71%
Republican	David M. Eldridge	7,160	33.71	N/A
Total votes		21,241	100.0	

1988 Illinois House of Representatives election
Party	Candidate	Votes	%	±%
Democratic	Ellis B. Levin (incumbent)	27,563	100.0	+27.13%
Total votes		27,563	100.0	

1986 Illinois House of Representatives election
Party	Candidate	Votes	%	±%
Democratic	Ellis B. Levin (incumbent)	16,341	72.87	+2.43%
Republican	Carol J. Dannenhauer	6,083	27.13	−2.43%
Total votes		22,424	100.0	

1984 Illinois House of Representatives election
Party	Candidate	Votes	%	±%
Democratic	Ellis B. Levin (incumbent)	23,220	70.44	−29.55%
Republican	Donald G. Bagger	9742	29.56	N/A
Total votes		32,962	100.0	

1982 Illinois House of Representatives election
Party	Candidate	Votes	%
Democratic	Ellis B. Levin (incumbent)	24,126	99.99
Write-in		3	0.01
Total votes		24,129	100.0

=== 1970 – 1962 ===
1970 Illinois House of Representatives election
Party	Candidate	Votes	%
Republican	Ronald K. Hoffman (incumbent)	52,651	27.72
Democratic	Joseph P. McGah (incumbent)	51,675	27.20
Republican	William D. Walsh (incumbent)	47,663.5	25.09
Democratic	James M. Tourek	37,959.5	19.98
Write-in		4	0.00
Total votes		189,949	100.0

1968 Illinois House of Representatives election
Party	Candidate	Votes	%
Republican	William D. Walsh (incumbent)	80,448.5	32.73
Republican	Ronald K. Hoffman	65,450.5	26.63
Democratic	Joseph P. McGah (incumbent)	53,743.5	21.87
Democratic	George D. Murphy	46,147.5	18.78
Total votes		245,790	100.0

1966 Illinois House of Representatives election
Party	Candidate	Votes	%
Republican	William D. Walsh (incumbent)	68,652.5	32.48
Republican	Lawrence X. Pusateri (incumbent)	65,076	30.79
Democratic	Joseph P. McGah	40,277	19.06
Democratic	John J. McNichols	37,337	17.67
Total votes		211,342.5	100.0

1962 Illinois House of Representatives election
Party	Candidate	Votes	%
Republican	William D. Walsh (incumbent)	77,074	30.28
Republican	Richard L. LoDestro	70,073.5	27.53
Democratic	Leo J. Bartoline	56,235.5	22.09
Democratic	John J. McNichols	51,194.5	20.11
Total votes		254,577.5	100.0

=== 1960 – 1956 ===
1960 Illinois House of Representatives election
Party	Candidate	Votes	%
Republican	Elmer W. Conti (incumbent)	94,320.5	29.46
Republican	William D. Walsh	79,516	24.84
Democratic	Joseph J. Lelivelt (incumbent)	78,743	24.59
Democratic	Joseph P. Sandro (incumbent)	67,596.5	21.11
Total votes		320,176	100.0

1958 Illinois House of Representatives election
Party	Candidate	Votes	%
Republican	Elmer W. Conti (incumbent)	56,687.5	28.53
Democratic	Joseph J. Lelivelt (incumbent)	53,055	26.70
Democratic	Joseph P. Sandro	46,164	23.23
Republican	Harry J. Smith (incumbent)	42,795.5	21.54
Total votes		198,702	100.0

1956 Illinois House of Representatives election
Party	Candidate	Votes	%
Republican	Elmer W. Conti	86,044	33.87
Republican	Harry J. Smith	72,117	28.39
Democratic	Joseph J. Lelivelt (incumbent)	51,095	20.11
Democratic	Edwin H. Bremer	44,806.5	17.64
Total votes		254,062.5	100.0
