= 2022 Illinois gubernatorial election =

- November 8, 2022
- Turnout: 51.06% ▼5.63 pp
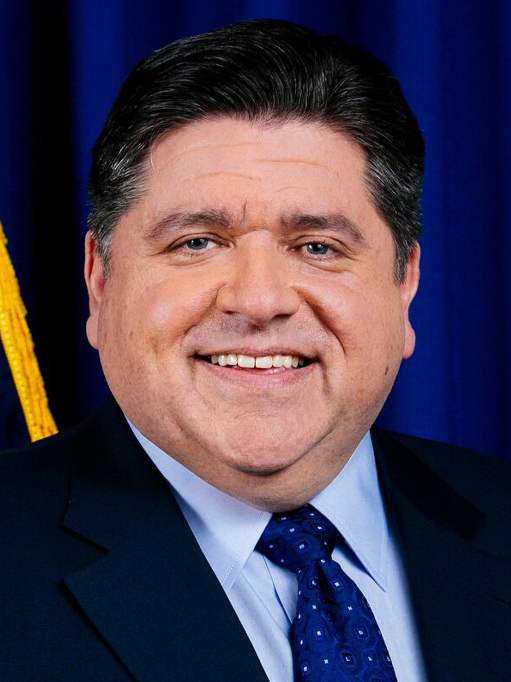

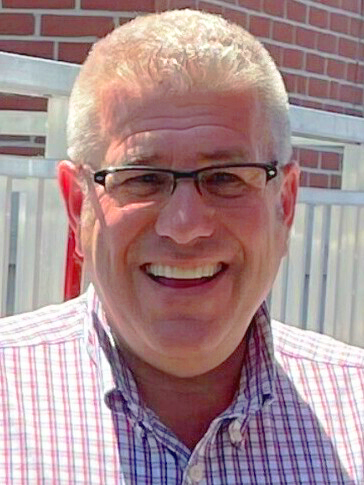
Nominee	JB Pritzker	Darren Bailey
Party	Democratic	Republican
Running mate	Juliana Stratton	Stephanie Trussell
Popular vote	2,253,748	1,739,095
Percentage	54.91%	42.37%
- Pritzker: 40–50% 50–60% 60–70% 70–80% 80–90% >90% Bailey: 40–50% 50–60% 60–70% 70–80% 80–90% >90% Tie: 40–50% 50% No votes
Governor before election
JB Pritzker
Democratic
Elected Governor
JB Pritzker
Democratic

The 2022 Illinois gubernatorial election took place on November 8, 2022, to elect the governor of Illinois, concurrently with the 2022 Illinois general election. Gubernatorial candidates ran on tickets with candidates for lieutenant governor. The incumbent governor and lieutenant governor, first-term Democrats JB Pritzker and Juliana Stratton, sought re-election together against Republican nominees Illinois State Senator Darren Bailey and his running mate Stephanie Trussell.

On election day, Pritzker won re-election with 54.9% of the vote, 0.4% higher than his 2018 performance, and the best raw vote percentage for a Democrat for governor since 1960. However, his margin of victory declined from 15.7% in 2018 to 12.5% in 2022. Pritzker's victory was once again the result of a strong performance in the Chicago metropolitan area—containing a majority of the state's population—winning a lopsided victory in strongly Democratic Cook County, the home of Chicago, as well as winning all but one of the neighboring collar counties. Bailey improved upon former Republican governor Bruce Rauner's performance in 2018 by just under 4%, largely due to the absence of a strong third-party conservative candidate that appeared in 2018. Subsequently, Bailey was able to flip the counties of Alexander, Fulton, Jackson, Knox, and Winnebago, which Pritzker had previously won, while Pritzker managed to flip McLean county, marking the first time since 1948 that it has voted for a Democrat in a gubernatorial election.

Pritzker was the first Illinois governor to serve a full term and be reelected for a second since Rod Blagojevich in 2006. If Pritzker serves the entirety of his term, he will become the first Democratic governor in the state's history to serve two full four-year terms, as every previous Democratic governor elected to such a second term had either been impeached and removed, died, or resigned before finishing their second term.

== Background ==
The primaries and general elections coincided with those for federal congressional races, the state's U.S. Senate race, and those for other state offices. The election was part of the 2022 Illinois elections.

The primary election was held on June 28. The general election was held on November 8, 2022.

== Democratic primary ==
=== Candidates ===
==== Nominee ====
- JB Pritzker, incumbent governor
  - Running mate: Juliana Stratton, incumbent lieutenant governor

==== Eliminated in primary ====
- Beverly Miles, U.S. Army veteran, registered nurse and activist
  - Running mate: Karla Shaw

=== Endorsements ===
JB Pritzker

Organizations

- Equality Illinois

Newspapers

- Daily Herald

Labor unions

- Illinois AFL–CIO
- International Union of Operating Engineers Local 150

=== Results ===
Results by county Pritzker: 50–60%; 60–70%; 70–80%; 80–90%; 90–100%

Democratic primary results
Party	Candidate	Votes	%
Democratic	JB Pritzker (incumbent); Juliana Stratton (incumbent)	810,989	91.88%
Democratic	Beverly Miles; Karla Shaw	71,704	8.12%
Total votes		882,693	100.0%

== Republican primary ==
=== Candidates ===
==== Nominee ====
- Darren Bailey, state senator
  - Running mate: Stephanie Trussell, former radio talk show host from Lisle, Illinois

==== Eliminated in primary ====
- Richard Irvin, mayor of Aurora
  - Running mate: Avery Bourne, state representative
- Gary Rabine, businessman
  - Running mate: Aaron Del Mar, Palatine Township Republican Committeeman
- Paul Schimpf, former state senator and nominee for Attorney General in 2014
  - Running mate: Carolyn Schofield, McHenry County Board member
- Max Solomon, Attorney
  - Running Mate: Latasha Fields
- Jesse Sullivan, venture capitalist
  - Running mate: Kathleen Murphy, former director of communications for state representative Jeanne Ives

==== Removed from ballot ====
- Emily Johnson
- Keisha Smith

==== Declined ====
- Rodney Davis, U.S. representative for Illinois's 13th congressional district (ran for re-election)
- Kirk Dillard, chair of the Regional Transportation Authority, former state senator, and candidate for governor in 2010 and 2014
- Adam Kinzinger, U.S. representative for Illinois's 16th congressional district
- Todd Ricketts, finance chair of the Republican National Committee, member of the TD Ameritrade Board of Directors, and co-owner of the Chicago Cubs

=== Endorsements ===
Darren Bailey

U.S. Executive Branch officials

- Donald Trump, 45th president of the United States (2017–2021)

U.S. representatives

- Mary Miller, U.S. representative from Illinois's 15th congressional district (2021–present)

State legislators

- Jeanne Ives, former state representative (2013–2019), candidate for governor in 2018 and nominee for Illinois's 6th congressional district in 2020
- Chris Miller, state representative (2019–present)

Organizations

- Illinois Citizens for Life
- Illinois Family Action
- Illinois Federation for Right to Life
Richard Irvin

U.S. senators

- Mark Kirk, former U.S. senator from Illinois (2010–2017) and former U.S. representative from Illinois's 10th congressional district (2001–2010)
- Tim Scott, U.S. senator from South Carolina (2013–present) and former U.S. representative from South Carolina's 1st congressional district (2011–2013)

U.S. representatives

- John Shimkus, former U.S. representative from Illinois's 15th congressional district (2013–2021)

U.S. Attorneys

- Dan Webb, former U.S. Attorney for the Northern District of Illinois (1981–1985), prosecutor in Operation Greylord

Statewide officeholders

- Leslie Munger, former Illinois Comptroller (2015–2016)
- Evelyn Sanguinetti, former lieutenant governor of Illinois (2015–2019)

State legislators

- Jim Durkin, Minority Leader of Illinois House of Representatives
- Jim Oberweis, former state senator, nominee for U.S. Senate and U.S. House of Representatives, and candidate for Illinois governor
- Mark Batinick, state representative
- Adam Brown, state representative
- Tim Butler, state representative
- Tim Ozinga, state representative
- Dan Ugaste, state representative

Local officials

- Bob Berlin, DuPage County State's Attorney
- Mike Downey, Kankakee County Sheriff
- Patrick Kenneally, McHenry County State's Attorney
- Sean Morrison, Cook County Commissioner and Chair of the Cook County Republican Party

Individuals

- Kenneth Griffin, entrepreneur and investor

Organizations

- Americans for Prosperity Action
- Fraternal Order of Police Chicago Lodge 7
- Illinois Trooper Lodge 41

Newspapers

- Daily Herald

Labor unions

- International Union of Operating Engineers Local 150
Gary Rabine

U.S. Executive Branch officials

- Michael Flynn, former U.S. National Security Advisor and former Director of the Defense Intelligence Agency

Local officials

- Mark Curran, former Lake County Sheriff and nominee for U.S. Senate in 2020
- Bill Prim, McHenry County Sheriff
Paul Schimpf

Newspapers

- Chicago Tribune
Jesse Sullivan

State legislators

- Chris Bos, state representative
- Michael Connelly, former state senator
- Norine Hammond, state representative
- Tony McCombie, state representative
- Ryan Spain, state representative

Organizations

- Lake County Republican Party
- Republicans of Wheeling Township

=== Polling ===
Graphical summary

Source of poll aggregation	Dates administered	Dates updated	Darren Bailey	Richard Irvin	Gary Rabine	Paul Schimpf	Max Solomon	Jesse Sullivan	Other (Note: Calculated by taking the difference of 100% and all other candidates combined.)	Margin
Real Clear Politics	June 6–13, 2022	June 15, 2022	35.0%	18.5%	7.0%	4.5%	1.5%	11.5%	22.0%	Bailey +16.5

Poll source	Date(s) administered	Sample size (Note: Key: A – all adults RV – registered voters LV – likely voters V – unclear)	Margin of error	Darren Bailey	Richard Irvin	Gary Rabine	Paul Schimpf	Max Solomon	Jesse Sullivan	Other	Undecided
Ogden & Fry (R)	June 24, 2022	518 (LV)	± 4.4%	38%	13%	9%	3%	1%	17%	–	20%
Fabrizio Lee & Associates (R) (Note: This poll was sponsored by People Who Play by the Rules PAC, which supports Bailey)	June 20–22, 2022	500 (LV)	± 4.4%	37%	14%	7%	4%	<1%	17%	1% (Note: Johnson with 1%, Smith with <1%)	18%
Remington Research Group (R) (Note: This poll was sponsored by Sullivan's campaign)	June 14–15, 2022	889 (LV)	± 3.0%	27%	13%	8%	6%	3%	27%	–	26%
The Trafalgar Group (R)	June 10–13, 2022	1,075 (LV)	± 2.9%	38%	20%	8%	5%	1%	12%	–	16%
Ogden & Fry (R)	June 11–12, 2022	662 (LV)	± 3.9%	31%	17%	8%	3%	1%	11%	–	30%
Public Policy Polling (D)	June 6–7, 2022	677 (LV)	± 3.8%	32%	17%	6%	4%	2%	11%	–	27%
Fabrizio Lee & Associates (R)	June 1–2, 2022	600 (LV)	± 3.5%	27%	20%	12%	3%	–	13%	–	24%
1892 Polling (R) (Note: This poll was sponsored by Irvin's campaign)	May 24–25, 2022	700 (LV)	± 3.7%	25%	31%	8%	2%	1%	11%	–	22%
Emerson College	May 6–8, 2022	1,000 (LV)	± 3.0%	20%	24%	8%	2%	2%	7%	–	37%
Cor Strategies (R)	April 29 – May 2, 2022	671 (LV)	± 3.8%	21%	33%	7%	2%	3%	10%	–	25%
Cor Strategies (R) (Note: Poll conducted for an undisclosed client)	April 18–21, 2022	536 (LV)	± 4.2%	13%	30%	4%	1%	2%	9%	2% (Note: Johnson with 2%)	38%
Cor Strategies (R)	~February 11, 2022	– (LV)	–	23%	10%	6%	5%	1%	11%	–	44%
Ogden & Fry (R)	October 3–4, 2021	404 (LV)	± 5.0%	33%	–	5%	3%	–	6%	3%	49%

=== Results ===
Results by county Bailey: 40–50%; 50–60%; 60–70%; 70–80%; 80–90%; 90–100%; Sullivan: 50–60%; Schimpf: 40–50%

Republican primary results
Party	Candidate	Votes	%
Republican	Darren Bailey; Stephanie Trussell	458,102	57.48%
Republican	Jesse Sullivan; Kathleen Murphy	125,094	15.70%
Republican	Richard Irvin; Avery Bourne	119,592	15.00%
Republican	Gary Rabine; Aaron Del Mar	52,194	6.55%
Republican	Paul Schimpf; Carolyn Schofield	34,676	4.35%
Republican	Max Solomon; Latasha H. Fields	7,371	0.92%
Total votes		797,029	100.0%

== Libertarian convention ==
=== Candidates ===
==== Nominee ====
- Scott Schluter, veteran, diesel technician, and chair of the Southern Illinois Libertarian Party
  - Running mate: John Phillips

==== Withdrew ====
- Jon Stewart, former professional wrestler and candidate in 2018

== Other parties and independents ==
=== Independents ===
==== Declared but never filed ====
- Mancow Muller, radio personality

==== Removed from ballot ====
- Tommy Belg

== General election ==
=== Predictions ===
Source	Ranking	As of
The Cook Political Report	Solid D	March 4, 2022
Inside Elections	Solid D	March 4, 2022
Sabato's Crystal Ball	Safe D	June 29, 2022
Politico	Likely D	April 1, 2022
RCP	Lean D	October 26, 2022
Fox News	Solid D	August 22, 2022
538	Solid D	June 30, 2022
Elections Daily	Safe D	November 7, 2022

=== Post-primary endorsements ===
JB Pritzker (D)

U.S. Executive Branch officials

- Joe Biden, 46th president of the United States (2021–2025)
- Kamala Harris, 49th vice president of the United States (2021–2025)
- Barack Obama, 44th president of the United States (2009–2017)

Statewide officials

- Jesse White, Illinois Secretary of State (1999–2023)

Local officials

- Lori Lightfoot, Mayor of Chicago (2019–2023)

Organizations

- 47th Ward Democrats
- Associated Fire Fighters of Illinois
- Cook County Democratic Party
- Democratic Governors Association
- Everytown for Gun Safety
- Giffords
- Gun Violence Prevention PAC
- Human Rights Campaign
- National Organization for Women – Illinois
- Personal PAC
- Planned Parenthood Illinois Action

Labor unions

- American Federation of Teachers – Illinois
- Chicago Federation of Labor
- Communications Workers of America
- Laborers' International Union of North America
- National Education Association
- Service Employees International Union – Illinois
- United Mine Workers

Newspapers

- Chicago Tribune
- eNews Park Forest
- Finger Lakes Times
Darren Bailey (R)

U.S. representatives

- Tulsi Gabbard, former U.S. representative from Hawaii's 2nd congressional district (2013–2021) (Independent)

State legislators

- Dan McConchie, minority leader of the Illinois Senate (2021–2023) and state senator (2016–present)

Organizations

- A Brotherhood Aimed Towards Education of Illinois
- Illinois Fraternal Order of Police

=== Polling ===
Aggregate polls

Source of poll aggregation	Dates administered	J.B Pritzker (D)	Darren Bailey (R)	Scott Schluter (L)	Margin
FiveThirtyEight	June 21– November 8, 2022	56.1%	39.9%	4.8%	Pritzker +16.2

Poll source	Date(s) administered	Sample size	Margin of error	JB Pritzker (D)	Darren Bailey (R)	Scott Schluter (L)	Other	Undecided
Victory Research (R)	November 5–7, 2022	1,208 (LV)	± 2.8%	49%	42%	5%	–	4%
Research Co.	November 4–6, 2022	450 (LV)	± 4.6%	56%	37%	2%	–	5%
Civiqs	October 22–25, 2022	659 (LV)	± 4.3%	56%	39%	–	3% (Note: "Someone else" with 3%)	1%
Emerson College	October 20–24, 2022	1,000 (LV)	± 3.0%	50%	41%	3%	2% (Note: "Someone else" with 1%)	4%
Emerson College	October 20–24, 2022	1,000 (LV)	± 3.0%	52%	42%	3%	3% (Note: "Someone else" with 3%)	–
University of Illinois Springfield	October 17–25, 2022	1,000 (LV)	± 3.5%	55%	40%	5%	–	–
Osage Research (R) (Note: Poll conducted for Bailey's campaign.)	October 13–15, 2022	600 (LV)	± 4.0%	44%	42%	4%	–	10%
Public Policy Polling (D)	October 10–11, 2022	770 (LV)	± 3.5%	49%	34%	8%	–	9%
Research America	October 5–11, 2022	1,000 (RV)	± 3.1%	50%	28%	6%	4% (Note: "Other" with 0%; "None" with 4%)	13%
Fabrizio, Lee & Associates (R)	September 25–27, 2022	800 (LV)	± 3.5%	50%	45%	–	–	5%
Fabrizio, Lee & Associates (R)	September 25–27, 2022	800 (LV)	± 3.5%	48%	40%	3%	–	8%
Emerson College	September 21–23, 2022	1,000 (LV)	± 3.0%	51%	36%	–	5% (Note: "Someone else" with 5%)	8%
Osage Research (R)	September 8–10, 2022	500 (LV)	± 4.4%	44%	37%	8%	–	13%
Victory Research (R)	August 30 – September 1, 2022	1,208 (LV)	± 2.8%	47%	36%	2%	–	15%
Victory Geek (D)	August 25–28, 2022	512 (LV)	± 4.3%	56%	38%	–	–	6%
Fabrizio, Lee & Associates (R)	August, 2022	800 (LV)	± 3.5%	50%	38%	3%	–	10%
Fabrizio, Lee & Associates (R)	August, 2022	800 (LV)	± 3.5%	52%	42%	–	–	6%
Victory Research (R)	July 17–19, 2022	1,208 (LV)	± 2.8%	49%	39%	2%	–	10%
Fabrizio Lee & Associates (R)	June 20–21, 2022	800 (LV)	± 3.5%	50%	43%	–	–	7%
Victory Research (R)	January 18–20, 2022	1,208 (LV)	± 2.8%	55%	27%	–	–	17%

Hypothetical polling

JB Pritzker vs. Richard Irvin

Poll source	Date(s) administered	Sample size	Margin of error	JB Pritzker (D)	Richard Irvin (R)	Undecided
Victory Research (R)	January 18–20, 2022	1,208 (LV)	± 2.8%	53%	22%	25%

JB Pritzker vs. Gary Rabine

Poll source	Date(s) administered	Sample size	Margin of error	JB Pritzker (D)	Gary Rabine (R)	Undecided
Victory Research (R)	January 18–20, 2022	1,208 (LV)	± 2.8%	52%	28%	19%

JB Pritzker vs. Paul Schimpf

Poll source	Date(s) administered	Sample size	Margin of error	JB Pritzker (D)	Paul Schimpf (R)	Undecided
Victory Research (R)	January 18–20, 2022	1,208 (LV)	± 2.8%	56%	22%	22%

JB Pritzker vs. Jesse Sullivan

Poll source	Date(s) administered	Sample size	Margin of error	JB Pritzker (D)	Jesse Sullivan (R)	Undecided
Victory Research (R)	January 18–20, 2022	1,208 (LV)	± 2.8%	53%	22%	25%

JB Pritzker vs. generic Republican

Poll source	Date(s) administered	Sample size	Margin of error	JB Pritzker (D)	Generic Republican	Undecided
Victory Geek (D)	November 8–10, 2021	800 (LV)	± 3.5%	49%	41%	10%

JB Pritzker vs. generic opponent

Poll source	Date(s) administered	Sample size	Margin of error	JB Pritzker (D)	Generic Opponent	Undecided
Victory Research (R)	July 17–19, 2022	1,208 (LV)	± 2.8%	47%	47%	6%
Fabrizio Lee & Associates (R)	June 20–21, 2022	800 (LV)	± 3.5%	47%	50%	3%

Generic Democrat vs. generic Republican

Poll source	Date(s) administered	Sample size	Margin of error	Generic Democrat	Generic Republican	Undecided
Fabrizio Lee & Associates (R)	June 20–21, 2022	800 (LV)	± 3.5%	46%	44%	10%

=== Debates ===
2022 Illinois gubernatorial debates
No.	Date	Host	Moderator	Link	Democratic	Republican
P Participant A Absent N Non-invitee I Invitee W Withdrawn						
P Participant A Absent N Non-invitee I Invitee W Withdrawn					JB Pritzker	Darren Bailey
	October 6, 2022	Illinois State University		YouTube	P	P
	October 18, 2022	NewsNation		YouTube	P	P

=== Results ===
2022 Illinois gubernatorial election
Party	Candidate	Votes	%	±%
Democratic	JB Pritzker (incumbent); Juliana Stratton (incumbent)	2,253,748	54.91%	+0.38%
Republican	Darren Bailey; Stephanie Trussell	1,739,095	42.37%	+3.54%
Libertarian	Scott Schluter; John Phillips	111,712	2.72%	+0.32%
Write-in		81	0.0%	-0.01%
Total votes		4,104,636	100.0%	
Turnout			40%	
Democratic hold				

==== By county ====
County	Pritzker / Stratton Democratic		Bailey / Trussell Republican		Schluter / Phillips Libertarian		Write-ins		Margin		Total
County	#	%	#	%	#	%	#	%	#	%	Total
Adams	5,033	20.11%	19,474	77.80%	508	2.03%	17	0.07%	−14,441	−57.69%	25,032
Alexander	699	40.90%	989	57.87%	21	1.23%	0	0.00%	−290	−16.97%	1,709
Bond	1,687	25.95%	4,611	70.94%	199	3.06%	3	0.05%	−2,924	−44.98%	6,500
Boone	6,803	38.48%	10,246	57.96%	605	3.42%	24	0.14%	−3,443	−19.48%	17,678
Brown	305	15.80%	1,595	82.64%	29	1.50%	1	0.05%	−1,290	−66.84%	1,930
Bureau	4,636	36.27%	7,738	60.54%	399	3.12%	8	0.06%	−3,102	−24.27%	12,781
Calhoun	588	24.42%	1,749	72.63%	69	2.87%	2	0.08%	−1,161	−48.21%	2,408
Carroll	1,868	30.99%	3,966	65.80%	189	3.14%	4	0.07%	−2,098	−34.81%	6,027
Cass	1,098	27.48%	2,782	69.64%	113	2.83%	2	0.05%	−1,684	−42.15%	3,995
Champaign	40,011	58.77%	26,061	38.28%	1,898	2.79%	109	0.16%	13,950	20.49%	68,079
Christian	3,466	27.63%	8,635	68.83%	431	3.44%	14	0.11%	−5,169	−41.20%	12,546
Clark	1,217	19.02%	5,071	79.23%	105	1.64%	7	0.11%	−3,854	−60.22%	6,400
Clay	782	13.40%	4,963	85.07%	87	1.49%	2	0.03%	−4,181	−71.67%	5,834
Clinton	3,114	20.90%	11,423	76.66%	357	2.40%	6	0.04%	−8,309	−55.77%	14,900
Coles	5,547	33.39%	10,622	63.95%	422	2.54%	20	0.12%	−5,075	−30.55%	16,611
Cook	1,065,445	73.85%	344,902	23.91%	32,422	2.25%	16	0.00%	720,543	49.94%	1,442,785
Crawford	1,377	19.55%	5,439	77.24%	214	3.04%	12	0.17%	−4,062	−57.68%	7,042
Cumberland	867	18.05%	3,830	79.76%	105	2.19%	0	0.00%	−2,963	−61.70%	4,802
Dekalb	17,047	49.43%	16,119	46.74%	1,266	3.67%	56	0.16%	928	2.69%	34,488
DeWitt	1,599	26.00%	4,352	70.76%	194	3.15%	5	0.08%	−2,753	−44.76%	6,150
Douglas	1,555	23.87%	4,778	73.34%	179	2.75%	3	0.05%	−3,223	−49.47%	6,515
Dupage	190,601	56.01%	138,667	40.75%	11,030	3.24%	0	0.00%	51,934	15.26%	340,298
Edgar	1,367	22.19%	4,624	75.05%	165	2.68%	5	0.08%	−3,257	−52.86%	6,161
Edwards	296	10.48%	2,488	88.07%	40	1.42%	1	0.04%	−2,192	−77.59%	2,825
Effingham	2,609	16.31%	13,072	81.71%	311	1.94%	7	0.04%	−10,463	−65.40%	15,999
Fayette	1,290	15.98%	6,627	82.11%	152	1.88%	2	0.02%	−5,337	−66.13%	8,071
Ford	1,230	23.78%	3,776	72.99%	162	3.13%	5	0.10%	−2,546	−49.22%	5,173
Franklin	2,952	21.48%	10,442	75.97%	339	2.47%	12	0.09%	−7,490	−54.49%	13,745
Fulton	4,924	37.37%	7,794	59.14%	449	3.41%	11	0.08%	−2,870	−21.78%	13,178
Gallatin	445	19.93%	1,716	76.85%	71	3.18%	1	0.04%	−1,271	−56.92%	2,233
Greene	951	20.71%	3,550	77.33%	90	1.96%	0	0.00%	−2,599	−56.61%	4,591
Grundy	6,966	35.89%	11,733	60.45%	710	3.66%	0	0.00%	−4,767	−24.56%	19,409
Hamilton	577	16.69%	2,819	81.52%	58	1.68%	4	0.12%	−2,242	−64.84%	3,458
Hancock	1,438	19.83%	5,619	77.48%	191	2.63%	4	0.06%	−4,181	−57.65%	7,252
Hardin	284	16.86%	1,339	79.51%	60	3.56%	1	0.06%	−1,055	−62.65%	1,684
Henderson	883	29.83%	1,980	66.89%	97	3.28%	0	0.00%	−1,097	−37.06%	2,960
Henry	6,949	35.23%	12,155	61.62%	619	3.14%	3	0.02%	−5,206	−26.39%	19,726
Iroquois	1,948	18.49%	8,334	79.09%	250	2.37%	6	0.06%	−6,386	−60.60%	10,538
Jackson	8,303	48.45%	8,372	48.86%	445	2.60%	16	0.09%	−69	−0.40%	17,136
Jasper	645	13.84%	3,943	84.60%	73	1.57%	0	0.00%	−3,298	−70.76%	4,661
Jefferson	2,821	21.34%	10,096	76.37%	295	2.23%	7	0.05%	−7,275	−55.03%	13,219
Jersey	2,174	23.08%	6,971	74.01%	268	2.85%	6	0.06%	−4,797	−50.93%	9,419
JoDaviess	3,754	39.38%	5,486	57.55%	286	3.00%	7	0.07%	−1,732	−18.17%	9,533
Johnson	868	17.93%	3,878	80.11%	95	1.96%	0	0.00%	−3,010	−62.18%	4,841
Kane	84,777	53.74%	68,064	43.15%	4,912	3.11%	0	0.00%	16,713	10.59%	157,753
Kankakee	13,287	37.65%	20,842	59.06%	1,115	3.16%	48	0.14%	−7,555	−21.41%	35,292
Kendall	22,218	49.08%	21,457	47.39%	1,532	3.38%	66	0.15%	761	1.68%	45,273
Knox	7,486	42.52%	9,597	54.51%	515	2.93%	8	0.05%	−2,111	−11.99%	17,606
Lake	137,912	60.21%	83,724	36.56%	6,990	3.05%	407	0.18%	54,188	23.66%	229,033
LaSalle	16,558	41.72%	21,781	54.88%	1,323	3.33%	25	0.06%	−5,223	−13.16%	39,687
Lawrence	909	17.77%	4,094	80.04%	110	2.15%	2	0.04%	−3,185	−62.27%	5,115
Lee	4,599	37.66%	7,220	59.12%	384	3.14%	10	0.08%	−2,621	−21.46%	12,213
Livingston	3,253	25.15%	9,315	72.01%	355	2.74%	13	0.10%	−6,062	−46.86%	12,936
Logan	2,724	27.99%	6,741	69.27%	255	2.62%	12	0.12%	−4,017	−41.28%	9,732
Macon	13,873	38.95%	20,764	58.29%	950	2.67%	33	0.09%	−6,891	−19.35%	35,620
Macoupin	5,575	30.73%	12,047	66.41%	499	2.75%	19	0.10%	−6,472	−35.68%	18,140
Madison	39,856	40.58%	55,205	56.21%	3,061	3.12%	86	0.09%	−15,349	−15.63%	98,208
Marion	2,859	21.97%	9,860	75.78%	286	2.20%	6	0.05%	−7,001	−53.81%	13,011
Marshall	1,463	30.80%	3,166	66.65%	120	2.53%	1	0.02%	−1,703	−35.85%	4,750
Mason	1,468	29.34%	3,361	67.18%	168	3.36%	6	0.12%	−1,893	−37.84%	5,003
Massac	1,047	21.44%	3,734	76.45%	103	2.11%	0	0.00%	−2,687	−55.02%	4,884
McDonough	3,269	34.53%	5,945	62.80%	246	2.60%	7	0.07%	−2,676	−28.27%	9,467
McHenry	55,134	47.38%	56,839	48.84%	4,192	3.60%	208	0.18%	−1,705	−1.47%	116,373
McLean	31,930	49.17%	31,125	47.93%	1,804	2.78%	85	0.13%	805	1.24%	64,944
Menard	1,567	29.60%	3,548	67.02%	166	3.14%	13	0.25%	−1,981	−37.42%	5,294
Mercer	2,297	33.84%	4,238	62.44%	250	3.68%	2	0.03%	−1,941	−28.60%	6,787
Monroe	4,609	29.30%	10,656	67.74%	453	2.88%	12	0.08%	−6,047	−38.44%	15,730
Montgomery	3,030	28.15%	7,395	68.71%	329	3.06%	9	0.08%	−4,365	−40.56%	10,763
Morgan	3,459	31.30%	7,314	66.19%	269	2.43%	8	0.07%	−3,855	−34.89%	11,050
Moultrie	1,250	23.49%	3,919	73.65%	135	2.54%	17	0.32%	−2,669	−50.16%	5,321
Ogle	6,518	33.37%	12,400	63.49%	612	3.13%	0	0.00%	−5,882	−30.12%	19,530
Peoria	29,195	49.46%	28,164	47.72%	1,664	2.82%	0	0.00%	1,031	1.75%	59,023
Perry	1,828	23.33%	5,804	74.09%	197	2.51%	5	0.06%	−3,976	−50.75%	7,834
Piatt	2,597	33.84%	4,785	62.35%	284	3.70%	8	0.10%	−2,188	−28.51%	7,674
Pike	975	16.39%	4,968	83.52%	0	0.00%	5	0.08%	−3,993	−67.13%	5,948
Pope	304	17.99%	1,361	80.53%	25	1.48%	0	0.00%	−1,057	−62.54%	1,690
Pulaski	584	28.77%	1,404	69.16%	41	2.02%	1	0.05%	−820	−40.39%	2,030
Putnam	1,080	38.60%	1,622	57.97%	96	3.43%	0	0.00%	−542	−19.37%	2,798
Randolph	2,999	26.19%	8,092	70.67%	342	2.99%	17	0.15%	−5,093	−44.48%	11,450
Richland	1,188	18.81%	4,950	78.38%	177	2.80%	0	0.00%	−3,762	−59.57%	6,315
Rock Island	25,663	53.20%	21,130	43.80%	1,410	2.92%	40	0.08%	4,533	9.40%	48,243
Saline	1,751	21.36%	6,241	76.15%	200	2.44%	4	0.05%	−4,490	−54.78%	8,196
Sangamon	38,161	47.94%	39,166	49.21%	2,156	2.71%	112	0.14%	−1,005	−1.26%	79,595
Schuyler	817	25.31%	2,307	71.47%	102	3.16%	2	0.06%	−1,490	−46.16%	3,228
Scott	378	17.80%	1,702	80.17%	36	1.70%	7	0.33%	−1,324	−62.36%	2,123
Shelby	1,890	19.19%	7,654	77.72%	233	2.37%	71	0.72%	−5,764	−58.53%	9,848
St. Clair	45,071	50.77%	41,154	46.36%	2,547	2.87%	3	0.00%	3,917	4.41%	88,775
Stark	593	25.41%	1,645	70.48%	89	3.81%	7	0.30%	−1,052	−45.07%	2,334
Stephenson	6,303	37.61%	9,897	59.06%	543	3.24%	15	0.09%	−3,594	−21.45%	16,758
Tazewell	17,424	33.85%	32,484	63.11%	1,526	2.96%	41	0.08%	−15,060	−29.26%	51,475
Union	1,839	26.17%	4,988	70.98%	192	2.73%	8	0.11%	−3,149	−44.81%	7,027
Vermilion	6,738	30.53%	14,674	66.49%	644	2.92%	12	0.05%	−7,936	−35.96%	22,068
Wabash	730	17.89%	3,288	80.59%	58	1.42%	4	0.10%	−2,558	−62.70%	4,080
Warren	2,024	34.06%	3,764	63.35%	153	2.57%	1	0.02%	−1,740	−29.28%	5,942
Washington	1,182	19.43%	4,739	77.91%	159	2.61%	3	0.05%	−3,557	−58.47%	6,083
Wayne	651	9.42%	6,140	88.88%	113	1.64%	4	0.06%	−5,489	−79.46%	6,908
White	878	15.23%	4,766	82.69%	120	2.08%	0	0.00%	−3,888	−67.45%	5,764
Whiteside	8,335	41.52%	11,090	55.25%	632	3.15%	17	0.08%	−2,755	−13.72%	20,074
Will	117,475	50.31%	108,464	46.45%	7,202	3.08%	357	0.15%	9,011	3.86%	233,498
Williamson	6,821	27.12%	17,723	70.46%	589	2.34%	21	0.08%	−10,902	−43.34%	25,154
Winnebago	41,987	47.63%	43,492	49.34%	2,598	2.95%	78	0.09%	−1,505	−1.71%	88,155
Woodford	4,341	25.54%	12,260	72.14%	382	2.25%	11	0.06%	−7,919	−46.60%	16,994
Totals	2,253,748	54.88%	1,739,095	42.35%	111,712	2.72%	2,366	0.06%	514,653	12.53%	4,106,921

==== Counties that flipped from Democratic to Republican ====
- Alexander (largest city: Cairo)
- Fulton (largest city: Canton)
- Jackson (largest city: Carbondale)
- Knox (largest city: Galesburg)
- Winnebago (largest city: Rockford)

==== Counties that flipped from Republican to Democratic ====
- McLean (largest city: Bloomington)

==== By congressional district ====
Pritzker won 14 of 17 congressional districts.

District	Pritzker	Bailey	Representative
1st	68%	30%	Bobby Rush (117th Congress)
1st	68%	30%	Jonathan Jackson (118th Congress)
2nd	66%	32%	Robin Kelly
3rd	68%	29%	Marie Newman (117th Congress)
3rd	68%	29%	Delia Ramirez (118th Congress)
4th	68%	29%	Chuy García
5th	70%	28%	Mike Quigley
6th	53%	44%	Sean Casten
7th	85%	13%	Danny Davis
8th	55%	42%	Raja Krishnamoorthi
9th	72%	26%	Jan Schakowsky
10th	61%	36%	Brad Schneider
11th	55%	42%	Bill Foster
12th	25%	73%	Mike Bost
13th	54%	43%	Nikki Budzinski
14th	52%	45%	Lauren Underwood
15th	28%	69%	Mary Miller
16th	36%	61%	Darin LaHood
17th	50%	47%	Cheri Bustos (117th Congress)
17th	50%	47%	Eric Sorensen (118th Congress)

== Notes ==
Partisan clients
