= 2022 Illinois elections =

- November 8, 2022

A general election was held in the U.S. state of Illinois on November 8, 2022. The elections for United States Senate and United States House of Representatives, Governor, statewide constitutional officers, Illinois Senate, and Illinois House were held on this date.

== Election information ==
2022 was a midterm election year in the United States.

The primary election was held on June 28. The general election was held on November 8, 2022.

On June 17, 2021, Governor JB Pritzker signed a bill which made a number of election-related changes. The bill made the November election day a state holiday. It also made permanent a number of changes that had been implemented for the preceding 2020 elections amid the COVID-19 pandemic, including "curbside voting" and universal access to postal voting. The bill also delayed the date of the 2022 primary election from March 15 to June 28, citing the delay in the release of 2020 United States census data needed for the reapportionment of electoral districts.

== Federal elections ==
=== United States Senate ===
The incumbent senator of Illinois's class 3 United States Senate seat was first-term Democrat Tammy Duckworth, first elected in 2016. She won re-election in 2022, defeating Republican nominee Kathy Salvi with 56.8% of the vote compared to Salvi's 41.5%.

=== United States House of Representatives ===
All of Illinois's seats in the United States House of Representatives were for election in 2022. Prior to these elections, Illinois saw its congressional seat boundaries change due to redistricting, and lost one seat due to post-2020 United States census reapportionment.

== State elections ==
=== Governor and lieutenant governor ===
The incumbent governor and lieutenant governor, JB Pritzker and Juliana Stratton, won reelection.

=== Attorney general ===
Incumbent attorney general, Democrat Kwame Raoul, won reelection.

=== Secretary of state ===
The incumbent secretary of state was sixth-term Democrat Jesse White. He announced that he would not seek reelection to a seventh term. Alexi Giannoulias defeated Dan Brady in the secretary of state election.

=== Comptroller ===
Illinois Comptroller election, 2022
- November 8, 2022
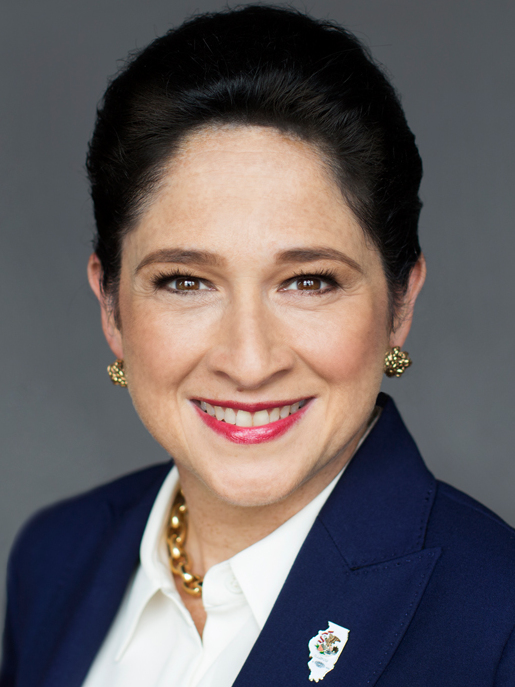

Nominee	Susana Mendoza	Shannon Teresi
Party	Democratic	Republican
Popular vote	2,331,714	1,676,637
Percentage	57.08%	41.04%
- Mendoza: 50–60% 60–70% 70–80% 80–90% Teresi: 40–50% 50–60% 60–70% 70–80% 80–90%
Comptroller before election
Susana Mendoza
Democratic
Elected Comptroller
Susana Mendoza
Democratic

The incumbent comptroller was Susana Mendoza, a Democrat who was first elected in a 2016 special election and subsequently reelected in 2018. Mendoza won the reelection, but ceded ground compared to her 2018 performance, with a margin of just 16% compared to 23%. She traditionally performed the best in Cook County, which was reflected by her victories in all ten congressional districts it is a part of. She won four other districts in the remaining part of the state, while Teresi secured just three overall.

==== Democratic primary ====
===== Candidates =====
====== Nominee ======
- Susana Mendoza, incumbent comptroller

==== Endorsements ====
Susana Mendoza

Organizations

- Equality Illinois
- Illinois AFL–CIO
- Illinois Chamber of Commerce
- Latino Victory Fund

===== Results =====
Democratic primary results
Party	Candidate	Votes	%
Democratic	Susana Mendoza (incumbent)	838,155	100.0%
Total votes		838,155	100.0%

==== Republican primary ====
===== Nominee =====
- Shannon Teresi, McHenry County auditor

===== Removed from ballot =====
- Michael Kinney, pro-Trump activist

===== Results =====
Republican primary results
Party	Candidate	Votes	%
Republican	Shannon Teresi	666,835	100.0%
Total votes		666,835	100.0%

==== Third parties and independents ====
===== Nominee =====
- Deirdre McCloskey (Libertarian), professor at University of Illinois Chicago

==== General election ====
===== Post-primary endorsements =====
Susana Mendoza (D)

Labor unions

- United Mine Workers

===== Polling =====
Poll source	Date(s) administered	Sample size (Note: Key: A – all adults RV – registered voters LV – likely voters V – unclear)	Margin of error	Susana Mendoza (D)	Shannon Teresi (R)	Other	Undecided
Emerson College	October 20–24, 2022	1,000 (LV)	± 3.0%	49%	36%	4% (Note: McCloskey (L) with 3%; "Someone else" with 1%)	11%

===== Results =====
2022 Illinois Comptroller election
Party	Candidate	Votes	%	±%
Democratic	Susana Mendoza (incumbent)	2,331,714	57.08%	−2.82%
Republican	Shannon Teresi	1,676,637	41.04%	+4.04%
Libertarian	Deirdre McCloskey	76,808	1.88%	−1.22%
Write-in		25	0.0%	±0.0%
Total votes		4,085,184	100.0%	
Democratic hold				

=== Treasurer ===
Incumbent treasurer Mike Frerichs won re-election to a third term.

=== State senate ===
All of the seats of the Illinois Senate were up for election in 2022, as this was the first election following redistricting.

=== State House of Representatives ===
All of the seats in the Illinois House of Representatives were up for election in 2022.

== Ballot measure ==
The Illinois General Assembly has the authority to refer statewide ballot measures, either as legislatively referred constitutional amendments or referendums. In order to be referred to voters, a proposed constitutional amendment must receive a vote of 60% approval in both chambers of the Illinois General Assembly. No gubernatorial approval is required. Advisory questions require a simple majority approval vote in each chamber of the Illinois General Assembly and the signature of the governor.

In Illinois, ballot initiatives can be included on the ballot. In Illinois, in order to be included on the ballot, an initiative must receive signatures of support equal in number to 8% of the turnout for the previous gubernatorial election. For the 2022 election, this meant that ballot initiatives required 363,813 signatures. Ballot initiatives in Illinois are only permitted to revise Section IV of the Constitution of Illinois. In order for an initiative be included on the November 2022 ballot, the signatures supporting it were required to be filed no later than May 8, 2022. No ballot initiative was filed by this deadline.

Thus far, a single ballot measure (a legislatively referred constitutional amendment) has been scheduled for the November general election.

=== Right to Collective Bargaining Amendment ===
Right to Collective Bargaining Amendment, 2022
- Illinois Amendment 1

Yes
70–80%
60–70%
50–60%
No
70–80%
60–70%
50–60%

In the November 8, 2022 general election, Illinois voters voted on whether to ratify the proposed Right to Collective Bargaining Amendment.

The proposed amendment would guarantee the right for employees to organize and bargain collectively through representatives of their choosing in negotiations concerning "wages, hours, and working conditions and to protect their economic welfare and safety at work." The amendment would also prohibit legislation which interferes with, negates, or diminishes collective bargaining agreements, including agreements which require union membership as a condition of employment. The amendment would, effectively, render any state or local "right-to-work" legislation (which would prohibit collective bargaining agreements that require union membership as a condition of employment) unconstitutional in Illinois.

Prohibition on local-level right-to-work ordinances currently exists through both Illinois state law and federal legal precedence. In 2019, Illinois ratified a state law prohibiting local governments from creating right-to-work zones. In 2017, in a case concerning a 2015 local right-to-work ordinance adopted by the village of Lincolnshire, Illinois, Judge Matthew Kennelly issued a ruling in the United States District Court for the Northern District of Illinois that the National Labor Relations Act does not enable local governments to pass right-to-work laws. This was a ruling counter to a 2016 United States Court of Appeals for the Sixth Circuit decision on such laws. Kennelly's ruling was subsequently upheld the following year by the United States Court of Appeals for the Seventh Circuit in a unanimous decision.

Currently, only three states in the United States (Hawaii, Missouri, and New York) have clauses in their state constitutions which assert a right to collectively bargain. Currently, no state constitutions have a clause prohibiting right-to-work legislation (which ban collective bargaining agreements that require union membership as a condition of employment).

The legislation referring the proposed amendment to voters received the needed 60% approval vote in the Illinois Senate on May 21, 2021, and in the Illinois House of Representatives on May 26, 2021.

In order to be ratified, the amendment is required to receive either 60% support among those specifically voting on the amendment or 50% support among all ballots cast in the state's election.

If ratified, the amendment would expand the Bill of Rights contained in the Illinois Constitution of 1970. It would add the following text as a new 25th section of Article I of the Constitution of Illinois,

SECTION 25. WORKERS' RIGHTS

(a) Employees shall have the fundamental right to organize and to bargain collectively through representatives of their own choosing for the purpose of negotiating wages, hours, and working conditions, and to protect their economic welfare and safety at work. No law shall be passed that interferes with, negates, or diminishes the right of employees to organize and bargain collectively over their wages, hours, and other terms and conditions of employment and work place safety, including any law or ordinance that prohibits the execution or application of agreements between employers and labor organizations that represent employees requiring membership in an organization as a condition of employment.

(b) The provisions of this Section are controlling over those of Section 6 of Article VII.

Illinois Amendment 1, 2023
Choice	Votes	%
For	2,212,999	58.72
Against	1,555,929	41.28
Total	3,768,928	100.00

== Judicial elections ==
Judicial elections were to be held, consisting of both partisan and retention elections.

== Local elections ==
Local elections took place in several jurisdictions, including county elections such as the Cook County elections.
