= Elmwood School District =

Elmwood School District may refer to:

- Elmwood Local School District, Ohio
- Elmwood School District (Wisconsin)

== See also ==
- Elmwood Park School District (disambiguation)
- Elwood School District
