= Elmwood Park School District =

Elmwood Park School District may refer to:

- Elmwood Park Community Unit School District 401 (Illinois)
- Elmwood Park Public Schools (New Jersey)
