= Nikki McDonald =

Kansas politician

Representative, Kansas House District 49

Member of the Kansas House of Representatives
- Incumbent
- Assumed office December 21, 2023

Personal details
- Spouse: Patrick
- Education: University of Arkansas (BSE, MAT)
- Website: https://mcdonaldforkansas.com

2"x2"px

Nikki McDonald is an American politician, educator, and community organizer who is currently serving as a Democratic member of the Kansas House of Representatives.

== Career ==
McDonald has earned a BSE in Elementary Education and an MAT in Childhood Development, both from the University of Arkansas. McDonald worked as a public school teacher earlier in her career, both in Arkansas and in Kansas. In Olathe, she taught English language learners at Fairview Elementary. She has listed education issues as a particular focus in office.

In 2017, she founded the Olathe Public Education Network, a nonpartisan, nonprofit organization "dedicated to promoting level headed voices to counter the encroachment of extremism" within public schools.

McDonald has worked on several political campaigns in Johnson County, including her predecessor Brad Boyd's successful Kansas House campaign.

Following Brad Boyd's resignation, McDonald was elected by the local Democratic precinct committee. Representative McDonald was re-elected in 2024 and is running for re-election in 2026.

McDonald is currently a part time teacher of Adult English Language Learners at Johnson County Community College and she owns a small business.

== Political career ==
In the Kansas House of Representatives, McDonald has served on the committees for Legislative Modernization, K-12 Education Budget, Financial Institutions and Pensions, Health and Human Services, the Education Funding Task Force and the Blueprint for Literacy Advisory Committee. In 2024, she introduced legislation which would eliminate the sales tax for personal hygiene products, including diapers and period products. In 2026, she introduced legislation that would strengthen DUI laws, legislation related to Fetal Alcohol Syndrome, and legislation to address suicide prevention and mental health. Representative McDonald is a strong advocate for mental health services and public school funding.

In a 2024 interview with the Johnson County Post, McDonald announced her re-election bid for Kansas' 49th House District, which includes parts of southern Olathe and Overland Park.

== Personal life ==
McDonald has lived in Olathe for 23 years with her husband Patrick. They have two children.

Kansas House of Representatives
Preceded by Brad Boyd	Member of the Kansas House of Representatives for the 49th District; December 21, 2023 - present	Succeeded by Currently Serving
