= Elmwood Park High School (Illinois) =

Coordinates: 41°55′20″N 87°49′46″W

Location
- 8201 West Fullerton Avenue; Elmwood Park, Illinois; USA

Information
- Type: Public secondary
- Motto: Our Pride, Our Students, Our Future
- Established: 1954
- School district: Elmwood Park Community Unit School District 401
- Principal: Amanda Brode-Rico
- Faculty: 70
- Grades: 9–12
- Enrollment: 1,022 (2023–2024)
- Campus: Suburban
- Color: Black Gold
- Athletics: Football, Baseball, Basketball, Wrestling, Soccer, Volleyball, Tennis, Track, Cross Country, Golf, Softball, Cheerleading
- Mascot: Tiger
- Nickname: EPHS
- Yearbook: Scroll
- Website: ephs.epcusd401.org

Elmwood Park High School, or EPHS, is a public four-year high school located in Elmwood Park, Illinois, a western suburb of Chicago, Illinois, in the United States. It is part of Elmwood Park Community Unit School District 401.

== About EPHS ==
Elmwood Park High School is a four-year comprehensive high school located in Elmwood Park, Illinois. Students are all residents of Elmwood Park.

Opened for classes in 1954, Elmwood Park now has an enrollment of approximately 950 students with approximately 225 students in the senior class. Follow-up studies indicate that approximately 90% of the graduates have continued their education beyond high school.

=== Accreditation ===
Elmwood Park High School is fully accredited by the North Central Association of Colleges and Schools and the Illinois State Board of Education.

=== Faculty ===
The school has a professional staff of 70 certified personnel.

=== National Honor Society ===
Elmwood Park High School is chartered as the Harold Grothen Chapter of the National Honor Society of Secondary Schools.

== Academics ==
In 2005, Elmwood Park had an average composite ACT score of 22.0, and graduated 92.9% of its senior class. The average class size is 20.3. Elmwood Park has made Adequate Yearly Progress on the Prairie State Achievement Examination in 2009 for the first time in years, a state test part of the No Child Left Behind Act. As of 2013, U.S. News & World Report had ranked the school in the top 10 percent in Illinois and in the U.S.

== Athletics ==
Elmwood Park competes in the Upstate Eight Conference and Illinois High School Association.

Elmwood Park Tigers 2012 Football team won the Metro Suburban Conference Title for the first time since 1985. They were co-champions of the Metro Suburban Conference again in 2017.
