= Brad Boyd (politician) =

American politician

Member of the Kansas House of Representatives from the 49th district
- In office January 9, 2023 – December 15, 2023
- Preceded by: Megan Lynn
- Succeeded by: Nikki McDonald

Personal details
- Born: Brad Boyd Chicago, Illinois
- Spouse: Myisha
- Relations: Lovana Jones

Brad Boyd is an American politician who formerly served as a state representative in the Kansas House of Representatives. He represented the 49th district from January 9, 2023 until his resignation on December 15, 2023. He was first elected in 2022 against Republican Party nominee Kristen A. Clark.

== Career ==
Boyd serves on the Olathe School Board as the vice chair. Boyd works as the director of organizing for Prairie Roots, a community organizing nonprofit.

In 2022, Boyd was unchallenged for the Democratic Party nomination for the Kansas House of Representatives' 49th district. He won the general election against Kristen A. Clark with a vote of 50.77% to 49.23%.

In the Kansas House of Representatives, Boyd served on the K-12 Education Budget committee, the Health and Human Services committee, and the Federal and State Affairs committee.

Boyd resigned from the Kansas Legislature on December 15, 2023, citing family reasons.

== Personal life ==
Boyd lives in Olathe with his family. His grandmother is Illinois State Representative Lovana Jones.

His Grandmother, former Illinois State Representative Lovana Jones, introduced Boyd to civics, government, and politics in his youth.

== Politics ==
In 2022 Boyd ran for the position of the District 49 State Representative in Kansas. He has also served on the Olathe School Board.

Kansas House of Representatives
Preceded by Megan Lynn	Member of the Kansas House of Representatives for the 49th District; January 9, 2023 - December 15, 2023	Succeeded by Nikki McDonald
