= Elmwood Park, Illinois =

Village in Cook County, Illinois, US

- Village
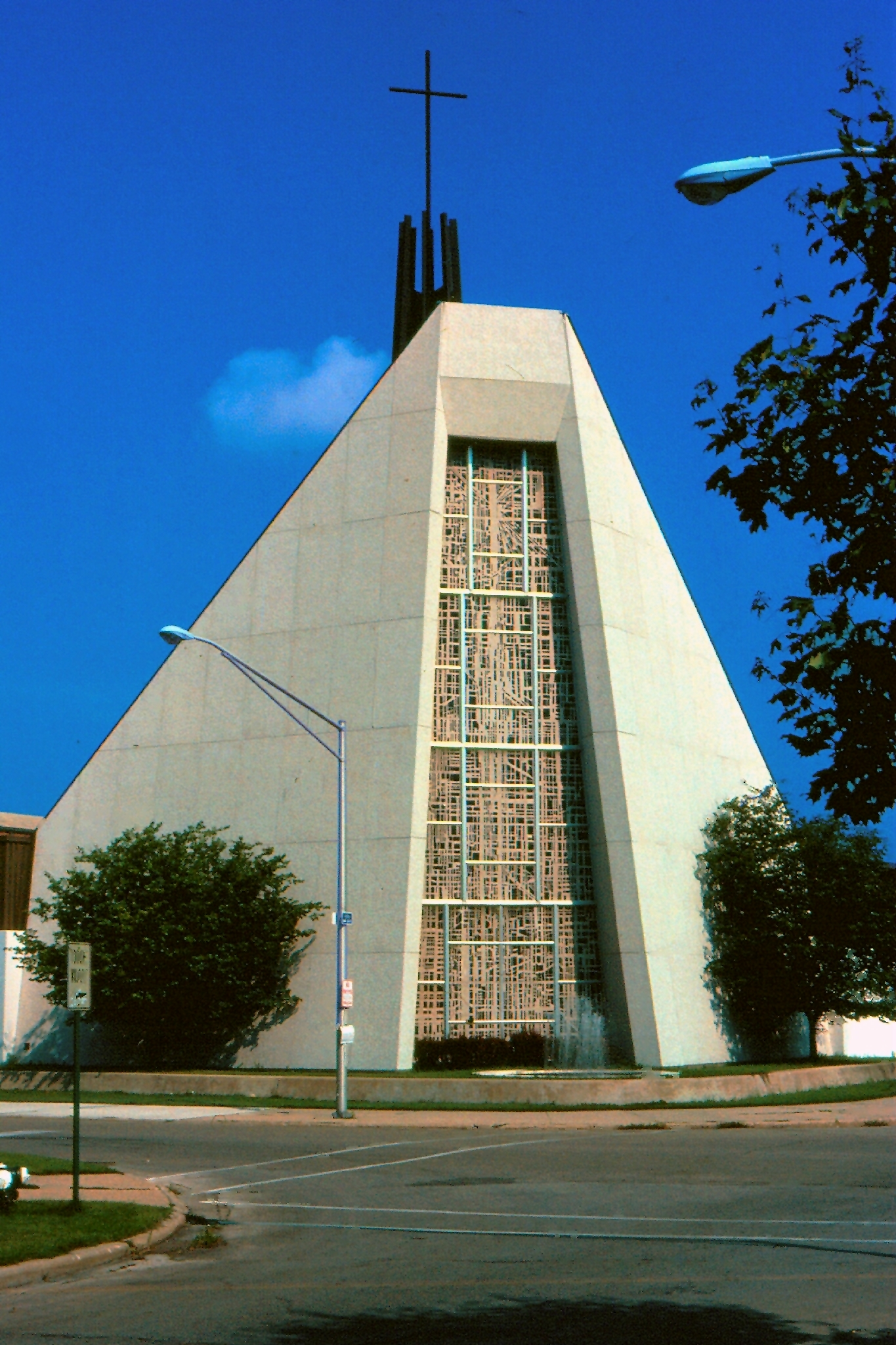
- Saint Celestine Catholic Parish

- Flag logo

- Location of Elmwood Park in Cook County, Illinois

- Location within Greater Chicago Location within Illinois Location within the United States
- Coordinates: 41°55′21″N 87°48′56″W
- Country: United States
- State: Illinois
- County: Cook
- Township: Leyden
- Incorporated: 1914

Government
  - Type: Council–manager
  - President: Angelo Saviano

Area
  - Total: 1.91 sq mi (4.94 km^{2})
  - Land: 1.91 sq mi (4.94 km^{2})
  - Water: 0 sq mi (0.00 km^{2}) 0%

Population (2020)
  - Total: 24,521
  - Density: 12,849.0/sq mi (4,961.04/km^{2})

Standard of living (2009-11)
  - Per capita income: $26,133
  - Median home value: $341,400
- ZIP code: 60707
- Area code(s): 708
- Geocode: 17-23724
- FIPS code: 17-23724
- GNIS ID: 2398817
- Website: www.elmwoodpark.org

Elmwood Park is a village in Cook County, Illinois, United States. The population was 24,521 at the 2020 census. The community has long maintained a large Italian American population, with a more recent influx of Hispanic and Latino Americans.

== History ==
Elmwood Park was incorporated as a village in early April 1914 in order to prevent annexation by the greater city of Chicago. Today, one can still see evidence of a minority of landowners, or share farmers, who voted for annexation to the city in 1915 by the odd chunk taken out of Elmwood Park's northeast corner, which kept the community from achieving a full square rectangular border.

At the turn of the century, urban dwellers would take a train on the Milwaukee Road, (which is now Canadian Pacific) westward out of the harsh concrete city for family picnics at the "Elm-Wood-Park", which was an ancient "grove of majestic 180 year old Elms" found near 72nd Ave/Harlem and Irving Park Road. Taking advantage of the park's provenance, a new cemetery was named Elmwood, while the closest train stop to both cemetery and park in unincorporated Marwood/Ellsworth became identified with the official name of "Elmwood Park". During the pressure era of incorporation a decade later, the village's founding representatives thought it most ideal to legally title the community after the stop, and after the namesake elm, which is a native, locally evolved, riparian prairie "bottomland" tree species.

Russell's Barbecue, the oldest continuously operating barbecue restaurant in Chicagoland, is located in Elmwood Park.

== Geography ==
According to the 2021 census gazetteer files, Elmwood Park has a total area of 1.91 square miles (4.95 km^{2}), all land.

== Demographics ==
Historical population
Census	Pop.	Note	%±
1920	1,380		—
1930	11,270		716.7%
1940	13,689		21.5%
1950	18,801		37.3%
1960	23,866		26.9%
1970	26,160		9.6%
1980	24,016		−8.2%
1990	23,206		−3.4%
2000	25,405		9.5%
2010	24,883		−2.1%
2020	24,521		−1.5%
U.S. Decennial Census

=== Racial and ethnic composition ===
Elmwood Park village, Illinois – Racial and ethnic composition Note: the US Census treats Hispanic/Latino as an ethnic category. This table excludes Latinos from the racial categories and assigns them to a separate category. Hispanics/Latinos may be of any race.
Race / Ethnicity (NH = Non-Hispanic)	Pop 2000	Pop 2010	Pop 2020	% 2000	% 2010	% 2020
White alone (NH)	21,490	17,929	14,075	84.59%	72.05%	57.40%
Black or African American alone (NH)	129	398	658	0.51%	1.60%	2.68%
Native American or Alaska Native alone (NH)	20	24	24	0.08%	0.10%	0.10%
Asian alone (NH)	522	570	732	2.05%	2.29%	2.99%
Pacific Islander alone (NH)	6	1	7	0.02%	0.00%	0.03%
Other race alone (NH)	9	21	51	0.04%	0.08%	0.21%
Mixed race or Multiracial (NH)	431	211	375	1.70%	0.85%	1.53%
Hispanic or Latino (any race)	2,798	5,729	8,599	11.01%	23.02%	35.07%
Total	25,405	24,883	24,521	100.00%	100.00%	100.00%

=== 2020 census ===
As of the 2020 census, Elmwood Park had a population of 24,521.

The median age was 41.6 years. 19.7% of residents were under the age of 18 and 17.2% of residents were 65 years of age or older. For every 100 females there were 91.9 males, and for every 100 females age 18 and over there were 89.8 males age 18 and over.

100.0% of residents lived in urban areas, while 0.0% lived in rural areas.

There were 9,545 households, including 5,979 families, of which 29.7% had children under the age of 18 living in them. Of all households, 45.3% were married-couple households, 18.5% were households with a male householder and no spouse or partner present, and 30.2% were households with a female householder and no spouse or partner present. About 28.5% of all households were made up of individuals and 12.3% had someone living alone who was 65 years of age or older.

There were 10,068 housing units, of which 5.2% were vacant. The homeowner vacancy rate was 1.6% and the rental vacancy rate was 5.5%.

=== Income and poverty ===
The median income for a household in the village was $63,312, and the median income for a family was $84,159. Males had a median income of $40,257 versus $34,548 for females. The per capita income for the village was $31,248. About 4.0% of families and 6.6% of the population were below the poverty line, including 6.4% of those under age 18 and 6.1% of those age 65 or over.

== Education ==
Elmwood Park's public schools are operated under Elmwood Park Community Unit School District 401. The schools include:

High school

- Elmwood Park High School

Middle school

- Elm Middle School

Elementary schools

- John Mills Elementary School
- Elmwood Elementary School

== Transportation ==
Elmwood Park is accessible via Elmwood Park station on Metra's Milwaukee District West Line, which provides daily rail service between Elgin, Illinois, and Chicago Union Station. Pace and CTA provide bus service on multiple routes connecting Elmwood Park to destinations across the region.

== Sister city ==
- Frosinone, Lazio, Italy (from 1996)

== Notable people ==
- Elmer W. Conti, Illinois businessman and politician
- John Giannini, college basketball coach
- Lee Loughnane, trumpet player and founding member of the rock band Chicago
- Jeff Mauro, television personality, Food Network
- Ray Nitschke, linebacker for the Green Bay Packers, member of the Pro Football Hall of Fame
