= Megan Lynn =

American politician

Member of the Kansas House of Representatives from the 49th district
- In office January 14, 2019 – January 9, 2023
- Preceded by: Scott Schwab
- Succeeded by: Brad Boyd

Personal details
- Party: Republican
- Spouse: Chad Lynn
- Children: 3
- Education: Muskingum University (BS) Bowling Green State University (MS)
- Website: www.meganlynnforkansas.com

Megan Lynn is an American politician. She represented the 49th District in the Kansas House of Representatives from 2019 to 2023. A member of the Republican Party, Lynn was first elected in 2018. She also serves as the precinct committeewoman representing Olathe Ward 4 Precinct 18.

== Early life ==
Megan Lynn (née Miller) was born in St. Paul, Minnesota, and raised in Amherst, Ohio. She attended Muskingum University where she received her bachelor's degree in political science and biology. She later obtained her master's degree in microbiology from Bowling Green State University. Lynn worked as a developmental biologist for eight years before she switched to a career in children's ministries.

Lynn is currently employed in children's ministries at the College Church of the Nazarene.

== Kansas Legislature ==
During the 2019, 2020, and 2021 legislative sessions, Lynn sat on the Health and Human Services Committee, the Financial Institutions and Pensions Committee, and the Social Services Budget Committee. Lynn was appointed vice chair of the Social Services Budget Committee for the 2021 legislative session.

== Election history ==
In 2018, Lynn won the primary election 88.95% to 11.05%, defeating Republican Fsehazion Desalegn. In the general election of that year, Lynn defeated Democrat Darnell Hunt 53.83% to 46.10%.
In 2020, Lynn was challenged by Democratic nominee Katie Dixon, and won the general election 51.02% to 48.88%.

Lynn opted not to seek reelection in 2022, instead choosing to work for Derek Schmidt's unsuccessful 2022 gubernatorial campaign. She was replaced by Democrat Brad Boyd.

== Personal life ==
Lynn married her husband, Chad, in 2003. Lynn and her husband currently reside in Olathe with their three children.
