= Lee Bey =

American journalist

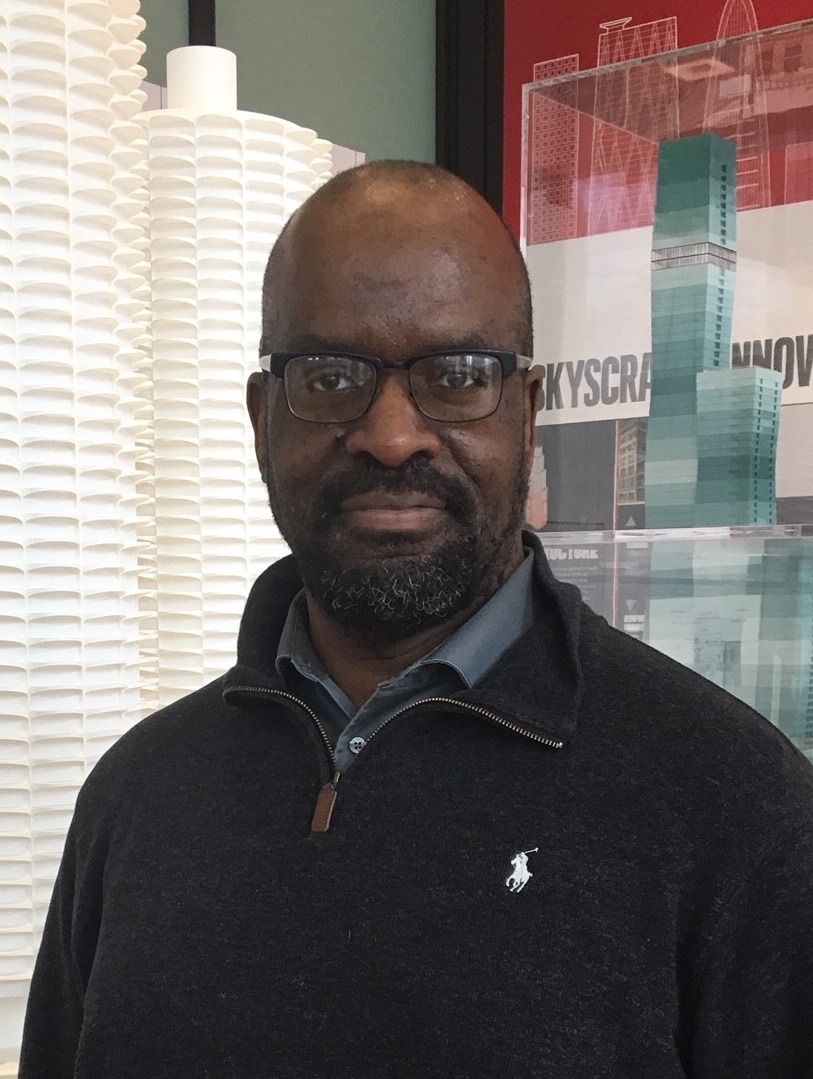
- Lee Bey, Chicago architecture journalist and photograph at the Chicago Architecture Centre, November 30, 2018
- Born: October 20, 1965 (age 60) Chicago, Illinois
- Occupation: Journalist; Photographer; Consultant

Lee Bey is the architecture critic for the Chicago Sun-Times. He is also a member of the Sun-Times editorial board, where he writes editorials on city governance, neighborhood development, politics and urban planning.

Bey is the author of the much-praised book Southern Exposure: The Overlooked Architecture of Chicago's South Side (Northwestern University Press, 2019), which showcases his architectural photography and social commentary. He is also the main photographer of the book Who is the City For? Architecture, Equity and the Public Realm in Chicago (University of Chicago Press, 2022), written by Blair Kamin.

Bey’s writing, reporting, and photography on architecture and urban design have been featured in Architectural Record, the Houston Chronicle, Crain’s Chicago Business, WBEZ Chicago Public Radio, Fox News Chicago, Architect, Chicago Architect, Old House Journal, Cite (magazine), Bauwelt, and Modulør.

He is also an in-demand speaker and media commentator on the subjects of architecture, urban planning, Chicago history and late 20th century Black history and culture.

Bey’s previous positions include stints as director of media and government affairs for the Chicago office of SOM, executive director of the Chicago Central Area Committee, and deputy chief of staff for architecture and urban planning under Chicago Mayor Richard M. Daley from 2001 to 2004. Bey is also an adjunct professor at the Illinois Institute of Technology College of Architecture.

Among many other awards, Bey is the recipient of the 2021 Julius Shulman Institute Excellence in Photography Award, and the 2019 Distinguished Service Award by the Chicago chapter of the American Institute of Architects.

== Early life ==
Bey was born in Chicago, Illinois. He graduated from Chicago Vocational High School where he prepared for a career as a printing press operator, but decided to go to college and pursue a career in journalism after receiving praise from a teacher about his writing.

== Work ==
As part of the 2017 Chicago Architecture Biennial, Bey created an exhibit titled "Chicago: A Southern Exposure." Housed at the DuSable Museum of African American History, the exhibit was named by Chicago Magazine one of "Three Must-See Events at the Chicago Architecture Biennial.". Bey developed the exhibit into a full-length illustrated book about South Side architecture published in October 2019 by Northwestern University Press.
