= Elmer W. Conti =

American politician and businessman (1921–1988)

Member of the Illinois House of Representatives
- In office 1957–1983

Personal details
- Born: April 9, 1921 Elmwood Park, Illinois, U.S.
- Died: January 4, 1988 (aged 66) Elmwood Park, Illinois, U.S.
- Party: Republican
- Education: Proviso High School; Western Illinois University
- Occupation: Politician, businessman

Military service
- Allegiance: United States
- Branch/service: United States Navy
- Battles/wars: World War II

Elmer W. Conti (April 9, 1921 – January 4, 1988) was an American politician and businessman.

Born in Elmwood Park, Illinois, Conti went to Proviso High School. He served in the United States Navy during World War II. Conti went to Western Illinois University. He was in the real estate and insurance business. Conti was elected to the Elmwood Park Village Board in 1949, and was the village board president from 1953 to 1985.

Conti was involved with the Republican Party. Conti served in the Illinois House of Representatives from 1957 until 1983. Conti died at his home in Elmwood Park, Illinois.

In 1966, Conti was the target of a political assassination attempt, in which a massive black powder bomb was placed in the garage of his home at 2211 North 77th Ave in Elmwood Park. The blast left a 6-inch deep impression in the concrete floor. No suspect(s) have ever been identified or criminally charged in relation to this incident.
