= Elmwood Park Community Unit School District 401 =

School district in Illinois, United States

Address
- 8201 West Fullerton Avenue Elmwood Park, Illinois, 60707; United States

District information
- Type: Public
- Grades: PreK–12
- NCES District ID: 1714100

Students and staff
- Students: 2,794

Other information
- Website: www.epcusd401.org

Elmwood Park Community Unit School District 401 (EPCUSD 401) is a school district headquartered in Elmwood Park, Illinois.

In 2019 the board approved a new infrastructure plan that voters were to vote on in a referendum worth $55 million held on March 17, 2020.

== Schools ==
Secondary schools

- Elmwood Park High School (9-12)
- Elm Middle School (6-8)

Elementary schools (1-5)

- Elmwood Elementary School
- John Mills Elementary School
