= Juliana Stratton =

American politician (born 1965)

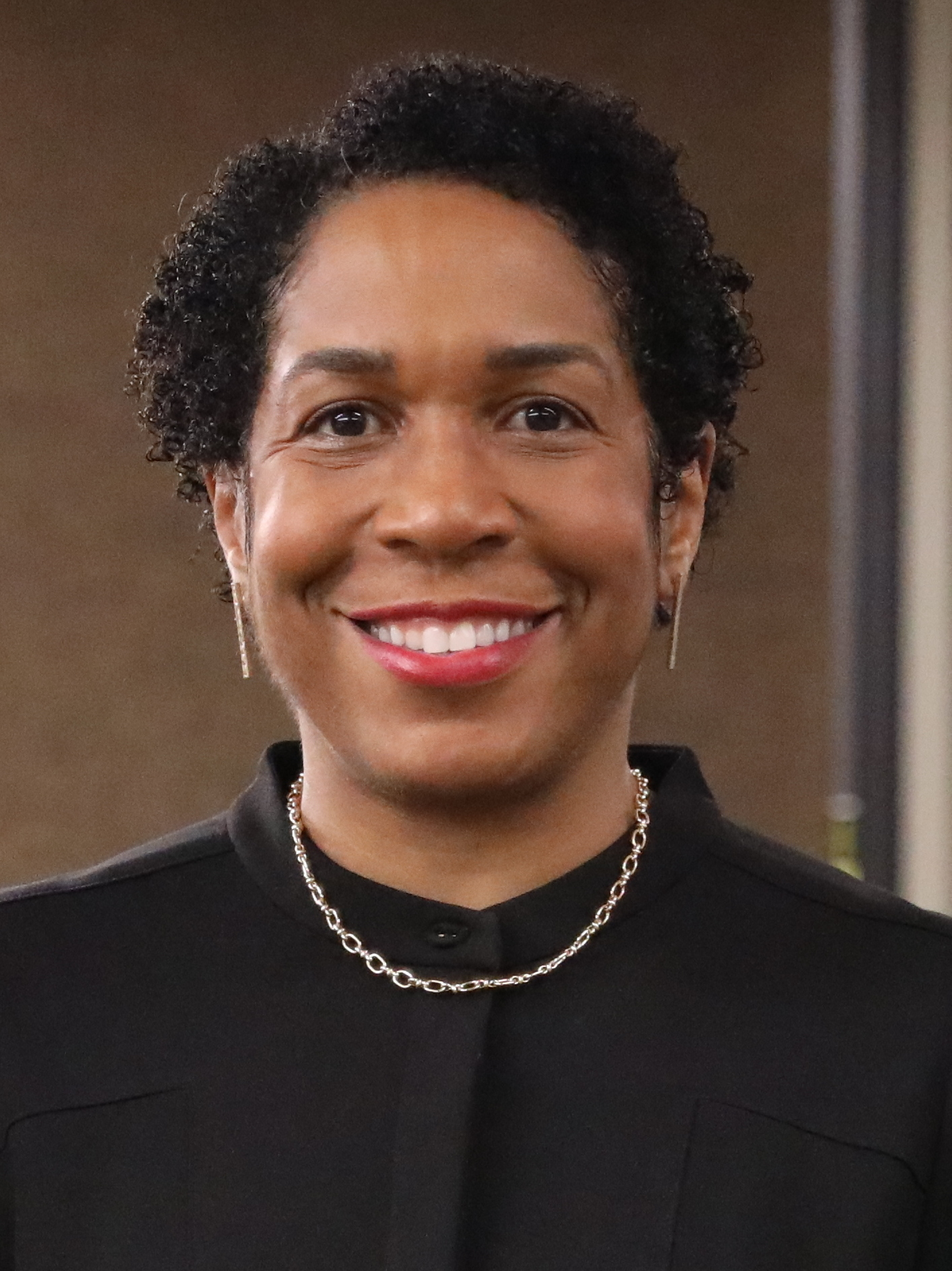
- Stratton in 2023

United States Senator-elect from Illinois
- Assuming office January 3, 2027
- Succeeding: Dick Durbin

48th Lieutenant Governor of Illinois
- Incumbent
- Assumed office January 14, 2019
- Governor: JB Pritzker
- Preceded by: Evelyn Sanguinetti

63rd Chair of the National Lieutenant Governors Association
- In office 2022–2023
- Preceded by: Mike Foley
- Succeeded by: Adam Gregg

Member of the Illinois House of Representatives from the 5th district
- In office January 11, 2017 – January 2, 2019
- Preceded by: Kenneth Dunkin
- Succeeded by: Lamont Robinson

Personal details
- Born: Juliana Wiggins; September 8, 1965 (age 61) Chicago, Illinois, U.S.
- Party: Democratic
- Spouse(s): William Stratton (div. 2016) Bryan Echols
- Children: 4
- Education: University of Illinois, Urbana-Champaign (BS); DePaul University (JD)
- Website: Campaign website

Juliana R. Stratton (née Wiggins; born September 8, 1965) is an American lawyer and politician who is a United States senator-elect from Illinois. A progressive member of the Democratic Party, she has served as the 48th lieutenant governor of Illinois since 2019. She was elected in 2018 and 2022 on a ticket with Governor JB Pritzker. Stratton was the Democratic nominee in the 2026 US Senate election in Illinois.

From 2017 to 2019, Stratton served as a member of the Illinois House of Representatives. She is the fourth woman (Note: The previous women to serve as lieutenant governor were Corinne Wood, Sheila Simon, and Evelyn Sanguinetti.) and first African-American to serve as lieutenant governor of Illinois. In April 2025, Stratton announced her candidacy for the United States Senate seat held by Dick Durbin in the 2026 election. She won the Democratic nomination on March 17, 2026, defeating U.S. representatives Raja Krishnamoorthi and Robin Kelly, along with seven other candidates. She defeated Republican nominee Don Tracy in the general election and will take office on January 3, 2027.

== Early life and education ==
Juliana Wiggins was born in Chicago on September 8, 1965. She was raised in the Pill Hill neighborhood on the city's South Side. Her father, Henry Wiggins, was a radiologist and her mother, Velma Wiggins, was a teacher who worked in Chicago Public Schools and the City Colleges of Chicago. She attended Kenwood Academy, and earned a Bachelor of Science from the University of Illinois Urbana-Champaign in 1987. She returned to Chicago after graduating to work as a video producer for the city government. She earned a Juris Doctor from DePaul University in 1992.

== Early career ==
In 1997, after a stint in private practice as a lawyer, Stratton started her own consulting firm, JDS Mediation Services, focused on mediation and alternative dispute resolution. She served as an arbitrator, legal hearing commissioner, and administrative law judge for several government agencies, including the City of Chicago's Department of Business Affairs & Consumer Protection, Office of Administrative Hearings, and Commission on Human Relations.

From 2011 to 2014, she served as executive director of the Cook County Justice Advisory Council, a body charged with coordinating and implementing criminal justice reform efforts for the Cook County Board President. From 2015 to 2017, she was the director for the Center for Public Safety and Justice at the University of Illinois at Chicago. She was also a founding board member of the Chicago's Children's Advocacy Center and served on the Juvenile Protective Association's board of directors.

== Illinois House of Representatives ==
In 2016, Stratton challenged Ken Dunkin for the 5th district seat in the Illinois House of Representatives. Dunkin had been criticized by fellow Democrats for withholding support on bills that would have reversed changes made by Republican Illinois Governor Bruce Rauner to social service programs. Stratton was endorsed by President Barack Obama and supported by several unions due to her support for "child care, labor, and home care".

In the March primary election, she defeated Dunkin with 68% of the vote. The race was one of the most expensive in the Illinois House, with a total of $6 million in contributions for the candidates.

By August 2017, she had led 25 bills, with nine appearing before Governor Rauner, and served on several committees.

== Lieutenant Governor of Illinois ==
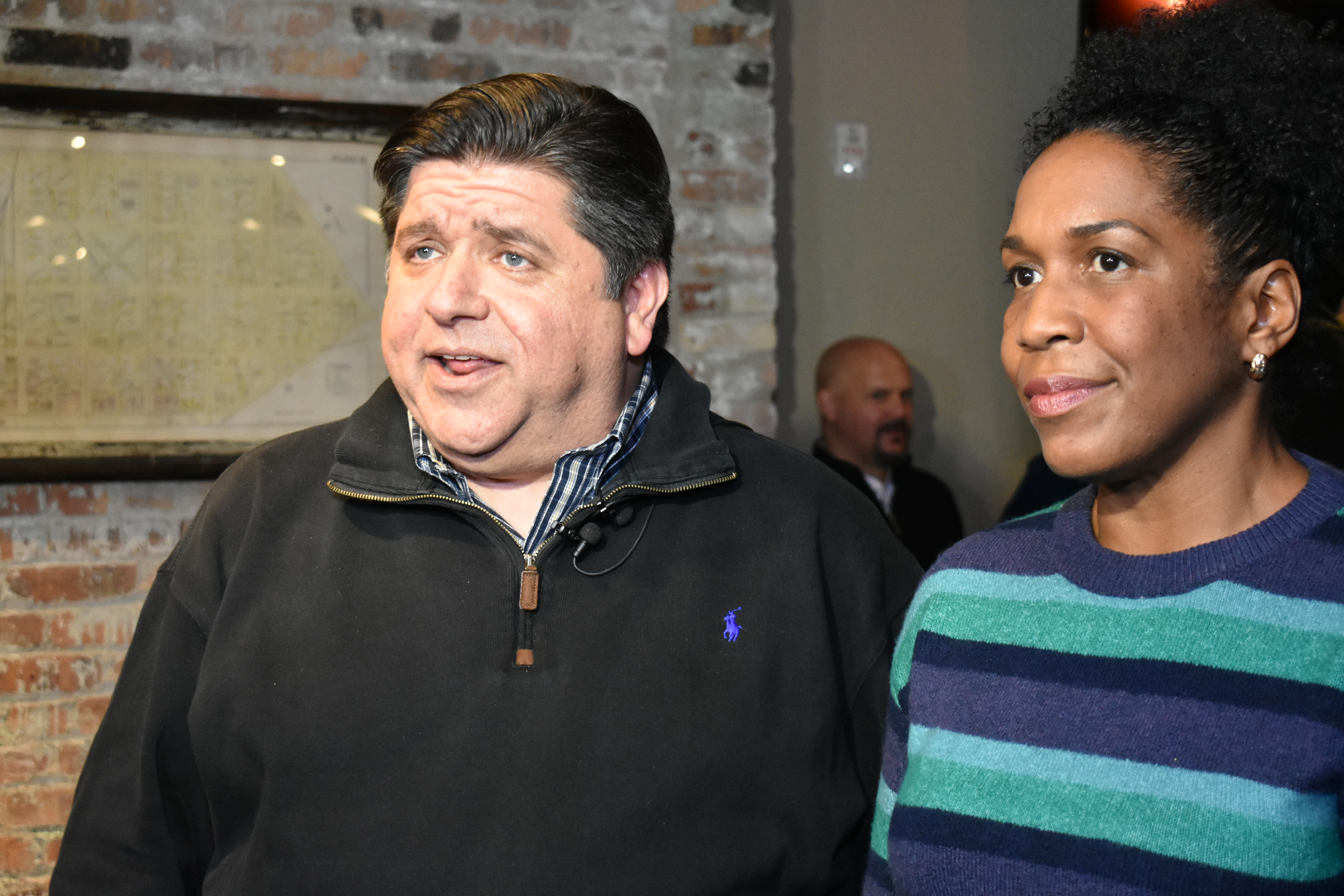
Stratton with Pritzker in 2018

On August 9, 2017, Stratton was announced as JB Pritzker's running mate in the 2018 gubernatorial election. She cited early childhood education and women's reproductive rights as two of her priorities, with criminal justice reform as another.

On November 7, 2018, she was elected Lieutenant Governor of Illinois. She and Pritzker defeated Republican incumbents Bruce Rauner and Evelyn Sanguinetti. Accordingly, she resigned from the Illinois House of Representatives effective December 31, 2018.

Since taking office, Stratton has spearheaded the Justice, Equity, and Opportunity Initiative and chaired the Illinois Council on Women and Girls, the Governor's Rural Affairs Council, the Military and Economic Development Council, and the Illinois River Coordinating Council.

In July 2021, Pritzker and Stratton announced that they would run for reelection in 2022. On November 8, 2022, Pritzker and Stratton were reelected, defeating Republican nominees Darren Bailey and Stephanie Trussell. They began their second term on January 9, 2023.

== 2026 U.S. Senate campaign ==
2026 Democratic primary results by county Stratton: 20–30%; 30–40%; 40–50%; 50–60%; Krishnamoorthi: 30–40%; 40–50%; 50–60%; Kelly: 30–40%; Tie: 30–40%

In April 2025, Stratton announced her candidacy for the U.S. Senate after incumbent Senator Dick Durbin announced he would not seek reelection. She was endorsed by Pritzker and U.S. Senator Tammy Duckworth. Pritzker contributed $5 million to boost her Senate race.

Stratton was noted in national press as one of several Black women running for U.S. Senate in 2026, including Robin Kelly of Illinois, Jasmine Crockett of Texas, Pamela Stevenson of Kentucky, Marquita Bradshaw of Tennessee, and Catherine Fleming Bruce of South Carolina. Stratton, Bradshaw, and Florida state representative Angie Nixon won the Democratic nomination.

Stratton won the Democratic primary on March 17, 2026, with 40.4% of the vote, defeating a crowded field including U.S. Representatives Raja Krishnamoorthi and Kelly. She defeated Republican nominee Don Tracy in the general election and will take office on January 3, 2027. She is the sixth black woman to be elected to the U.S. Senate, and would make Illinois one of the few states to have two women to serve as senators and the first to be represented by two women of color. (Duckworth is Asian-American).

== Political positions ==
=== Healthcare ===
Stratton supports Medicare for All and has said that health care is "a right, not a privilege". She has emphasized expanding access, particularly in rural areas where hospitals are in danger of having to close, lowering prescription drug costs, reducing medical debt, and addressing disparities in maternal health outcomes, specifically noting the need to address the Black maternal mortality crisis. She points to policies implemented in Illinois as evidence that expanding access and affordability is achievable.

=== LGBTQ+ rights ===
The Pritzker administration, in which Stratton served as lieutenant governor, has required insurers to cover gender-affirming care and made Illinois a refuge state for those seeking it. In 2022, the Human Rights Campaign endorsed Pritzker and Stratton for reelection due to their record of supporting LGBTQ+ rights.

In 2025, Stratton vowed that as US senator she would confirm only judges who support LGBTQ+ rights. She disagrees with the removal of LGBTQ+ resources from the 988 Suicide and Crisis Lifeline and recent restrictions on gender-affirming care.

=== Immigration ===
Stratton has a strongly reform-oriented stance on immigration. She supports abolishing Immigration and Customs Enforcement (ICE) and increasing oversight and accountability in immigration enforcement. She supports the Protecting Sensitive Locations Act, which would keep ICE out of schools, churches, and hospitals, require clear identification, and ban non-medical face coverings for agents. Stratton has said she wants to create "a better pathway to citizenship" for undocumented immigrants, including DREAMers. She also supports legislation such as the American Dream and Promise Act.

=== Institutional reform ===
Stratton supports abolishing the filibuster. She has argued that the current 60-vote "supermajority" threshold makes it too difficult to pass legislation and has blocked progress on key issues such as reproductive rights, gun safety, and voting rights. Stratton emphasized that voters want lawmakers to implement policies that improve their lives and protect their rights, and she believes the filibuster stands in the way of that goal. She said, "Illinoisans need their next senator to stand up and act." She also said she would be open to major reforms if full abolition is not achievable.

Stratton believes the Supreme Court must be reformed and has said she "would be open to a variety of options, including term limits and deadlines to confirm new appointments or potential expansion".

Stratton has said that, if elected, she will not support Chuck Schumer for another term as leader of the Democrats in the Senate, saying that voters "want people who are going to stand up, fight for what's important [...] They're looking for leaders who will meet this moment."

=== Iran war ===
Stratton opposes the Iran war and has criticized President Donald Trump for pursuing military action without a clear plan or justification. She has said that "American people [are] having to foot the bill" for increased military spending as a result, when government resources should instead be directed toward lowering everyday costs and improving access to essential services like health care.

=== Minimum wage ===
Stratton supports raising the federal minimum wage to $25 per hour. She argues that current wages are too low for workers to meet basic needs and that people should not have to work multiple jobs to survive. She believes higher wages would help working families achieve greater financial stability while also benefiting local economies.

=== Technology ===
Stratton supports regulating artificial intelligence (AI) to protect workers and prevent discrimination. She advocates for job training and education programs to help workers adapt to technological changes and ensure that AI's benefits are broadly shared, saying, "AI innovation must benefit everyone, not simply help tech industry giants at the expense of working families".

== Personal life ==
Stratton is married and has four children. She lives in Bronzeville. She first married William Stratton, with whom she had three children; they divorced in 2016. She later married Bryan Echols, who has one child. She credits her hobby of running marathons and triathlons for giving her the discipline needed for campaigning. She is a member of the Chicago Bar Association, Alpha Kappa Alpha, The Links, Incorporated, and the Chicago chapter of Jack and Jill of America.

== See also ==
- List of minority governors and lieutenant governors in the United States
- Black women in American politics
- Women in the United States Senate
- List of African-American United States Senate candidates

== Notes ==
Party political offices
Preceded by Paul Vallas	Democratic nominee for Lieutenant Governor of Illinois; 2018, 2022	Succeeded by Christian Mitchell
Preceded by Dick Durbin	Democratic nominee for U.S. Senator from Illinois (Class 2); 2026	Most recent
Political offices
Preceded by Evelyn Sanguinetti	Lieutenant Governor of Illinois; 2019–present	Incumbent
U.S. Senate
Preceded by Dick Durbin	U.S. Senator (Class 2) from Illinois; Taking office 2027; Served alongside: Tammy Duckworth	Elect
