= Kenneth Dunkin =

American politician

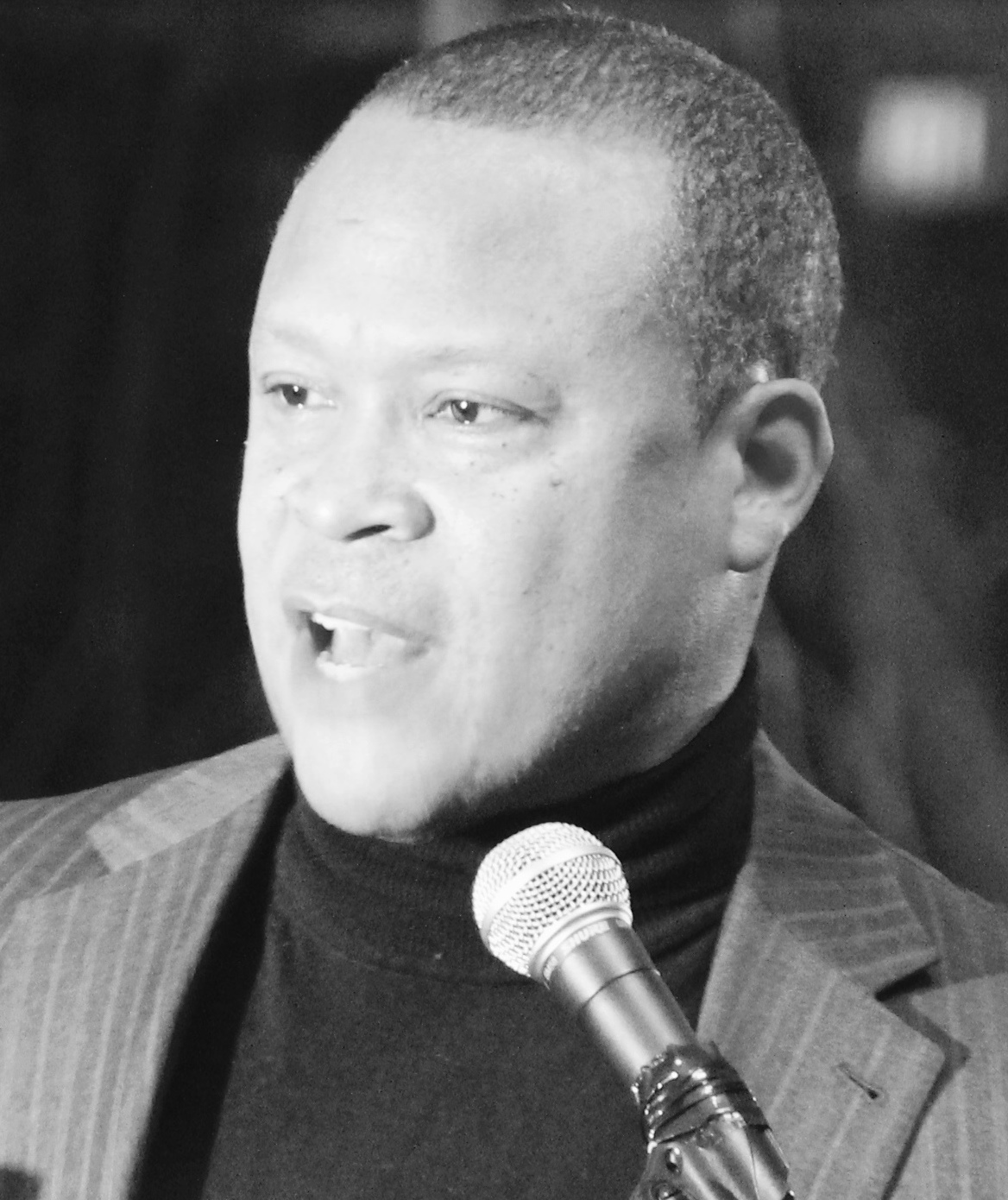

Member of the MWRDGC Board of Commissioners
- In office May 2018 – December 2018
- Appointed by: Bruce Rauner
- Preceded by: Timothy Bradford
- Succeeded by: Cameron Davis

Member of the Illinois House of Representatives from the 5th district
- In office December 2002 – January 2017
- Preceded by: Lovana Jones
- Succeeded by: Juliana Stratton

Personal details
- Born: February 12, 1966 (age 60) Chicago, Illinois, U.S.
- Party: Democratic
- Children: 3
- Education: University of Chicago; Morehouse College
- Occupation: Politician; Social worker

Kenneth Dunkin (born February 12, 1966) is an American politician. Dunkin previously served as a Democratic member of the Illinois House of Representatives, representing the 5th District from December 2002 until January 2017 and as an appointed by Governor Bruce Rauner to fill a vacancy on the Board of Commissioners for the Metropolitan Water Reclamation District of Greater Chicago in May 2018, serving until December of that same year.

== Early life ==
Born February 12, 1966 in Chicago, Dunkin was raised in the Cabrini–Green housing project on the city's Near-north side. After graduating from Lincoln Park High School in 1984, Dunkin went on to earn his associate degree from Loop College (now known as Harold Washington College). Dunkin continued his education at Morehouse College where he earned his bachelor's degree in Political Science and later his master's degree in social welfare from the School of Social Service Administration at the University of Chicago. As a youth, Dunkin was influenced by Jesse White, Illinois politician and founder of the Jesse White Tumbling Team.

== Public service ==
Dunkin worked as social worker for many years. Most recently, he was the Director of the Robert Taylor Boys and Girls Club of Chicago, where he managed over $2.5 million in program services. He also worked as a consultant for the City of Chicago Department of Health and Department on Aging. He interned with U.S. Department of Health and Human Services Health Care Financing Administration, and United States Senator Paul Simon. Dunkin is currently a member of the Attorney Registration Disciplinary Commission (appointed by Illinois Supreme Court), Board of the Chicago International Film Festival, Lawson YMCA, Near North Health Services Corp, Phi Beta Sigma fraternity and the Governor's Film Task Force.

== State representative ==
As a member of the Illinois House of Representatives, Dunkin served on seven committees: International Trade & Commerce, Financial Institutions, Insurance, Mass Transit, Appropriations-High Education, Telecommunications, and Chairman of Tourism and Conventions. Dunkin was also a member of the Illinois Legislative Black Caucus. Representative Ken Dunkin was the Chief Sponsor for the Illinois Film Tax Credit. This legislation generated thousands of union and non-union jobs throughout the state and hundreds of millions of dollars in local and state tax revenue. His film credit encouraged major film, commercial and television such as "Batman-The Dark Knight","The Beast", "Public Enemy", "Barbershop 1 & 2", "The Break-Up", "Roll-Bounce", "Ocean's 12," "The Weather Man", "Spider-Man 2", "Derailed", "Transformers 3", etc. to be shot in Illinois.

Dunkin served as a State Lawmaker for over 15 years and was a member of the Illinois House of Representatives. He was becoming a ranking member with influence and did not side with the Madigan allyship that many Democrats found shelter under. Because of that, several times he had to stand up for his own position when many others disagreed.

In 2013, Representative Dunkin voted "yea" to a plan that amended state employee pension plans by drastically reducing the constitutionally protected benefits of Illinois state employees in retirement. The Illinois Supreme Court ultimately found these legislative changes to be unconstitutional. Dunkin later "no-showed" (did not vote) on an important vote in the House. House Democrats were attempting of override a veto by Governor Bruce Rauner on SB 1229. SB 1229 which would have empowered an arbitrator to decide negotiation disputes between public sector unions and the governor. Its implementation would have impeded the Governor's ability to force a "lock-out" of state workers during contract negotiations and also prevented the union from striking. As reported by the Chicago Sun-times, Dunkin, responding over text, played coy initially when a Sun-Times reporter asked him about his absence:

"Why, what's going on??" Dunkin responded. He then said: "I'm out of town as I informed the Speaker et al last week. Period." When defending his decision to no-show on the SB1229 vote, Rep. Dunkin's response was, "This bill meant nothing to the average person."

On November 10, 2015, Representative Dunkin once again sided with Governor Rauner rather than his Democratic caucus involving a vote on child care assistance. House Democrats were just one vote short — voting 70-35 on Senate Bill 570. It needed 71 votes to override the governor's veto. Rep. Ken Dunkin, D-Chicago, did not vote — showing some tension between House Democrats and the administration. "'Come on, Ken!'" House Democrats implored as Dunkin did not vote on two key bills favored by colleagues. [...]

"Let me be clear that no one bears more responsibility today for the defeat of this legislation, which protects our children and child care and home care in Illinois than Rep. Ken Dunkin himself," Jaquie Algee, vice president of SEIU Healthcare Illinois said at a press conference organized by House Speaker Michael Madigan.

– At one point during an intense, emotional floor debate, state Rep. Jaime Andrade stripped Dunkin's nameplate from the front of his seat, walked it over to the Republican side of the chamber then threw it down, saying: "He's all yours now."

The Illinois AFL-CIO Executive Board voted on December 17, 2015 to endorse Juliana Stratton for State Representative in the Democratic Primary Election for the 5th District. Stratton took on incumbent Ken Dunkin, who had sided with Gov. Bruce Rauner, casting controversial votes against the interests of working families as well as issues including child care eligibility, funding for services for seniors and the disabled and an arbitration mechanism to keep state services functioning in the event of bargaining impasse.

"There needs to a change in the 5th District," AFL-CIO President Michael Carrigan said. "The voters will know that there is a person in this race that cares about her community and not political alliances. As she has been all of her life, she will be their voice." There are nearly 16,000 members of union families in the 5th House District.

Many prominent Democrats in Illinois officially endorsed Dunkin's opponent, Julia Stratton, including his "mentor" Jesse White White expanded upon his endorsement, saying "I always say when you take on a job, you take on the responsibility for everybody," White said. "In the case of Ken Dunkin, he has been a big disappointment to me and to his constituents, to the people of the state of Illinois and to the people of the 5th District. The message is they can no longer afford Ken Dunkin." [...]

Opponents of Ken Dunkin's re-election campaign distributed a mailer showing Rep. Dunkin in a police mugshot from nearly two decades earlier. The ad was allegedly paid for by Ald. Brendan Reilly's 42nd Ward Democratic Organization. Crain's Chicago Business referred to the message of the ad as 'brutal'.

On March 7, 2016, Representative Dunkin's opponent, attorney Juliana Stratton, announced that the President of the United States had personally endorsed her in the upcoming primary. The endorsement came just weeks after Representative Dunkin claimed that the President had given him a "shout out" and "reaffirmed" Dunkin's decision to side with Republican Governor Bruce Rauner on a number of key issues. When President Obama was addressing the Illinois General Assembly, the POTUS said reaching political compromise across the aisle "doesn't make me a sellout to my own party." Dunkin stood up and shouted "Yes!" and Obama replied, "Sit down Dunkin, we'll talk later."

On March 7, 2016, the Chicago Sun-times reported that the Dunkin campaign was facing serious allegations of voter fraud within a high-stakes Illinois House campaign; catching the attention of Cook County prosecutors. Secretary of State Jesse White and Ald. Pat Dowell (3rd) appeared at a South Side press conference to accuse Rep. Ken Dunkin of buying early votes in the battle to keep his 5th District seat in the state House of Representatives. Dunkin's opponent, Juliana Stratton, also stood nearby as Dowell shared what she claimed is video evidence of Dunkin's alleged scheme — purportedly shot by people who infiltrated the vote-buying operation and cast ballots in exchange for "crisp $50 bills." "This is a violation of all laws of human decency, and shame on Mr. Dunkin and his organization for doing this," Dunkin's "former mentor" Jesse White said.

Democratic mayor Rahm Emanuel opined on the Dunkin-Rauner alliance recently, stating: "We've had a standstill down in Springfield, and I think the Governor and Ken Dunkin have a partnership, and I think it's bad for Chicago, bad for Illinois. And the question is: Are we going to have somebody rewarded that, in my view, is not going to pass a budget that invests in Chicago and in Chicago's schoolchildren, or are we going to hold everything hostage?". On March 15, 2016, Democratic challenger Juliana Stratton defeated Ken Dunkin in a decisive manner, as reported by WGN News.
