= Leo Bartoline =

American lawyer and politician

Leo Bartoline (August 7, 1908 – June 10, 1963) was an American lawyer and politician.

Born in Italy, Bartoline emigrated with his family in 1915 and settled in Chicago, Illinois. Bertoline received his bachelor's degree from Roosevelt University and his law degree from John Marshall Law School. He then practiced law in Franklin Park, Illinois where he also lived. Bartoline was a Democrat He served in the Illinois House of Representatives in 1963. Bartoline died suddenly of a heart attack while the house was in session in Springfield, Illinois.
