= William D. Walsh =

American politician and businessman

Member of the Illinois House of Representatives

Personal details
- Party: Republican

William D. Walsh (February 5, 1924 – August 3, 2003) was an American politician and businessman.

Born in Chicago, Illinois, Walsh served in the United States Navy during World War II. He received his bachelor's degree from Loyola University Chicago and did graduate work at Northwestern University. He worked in his family's insurance business and lived in La Grange, Illinois. He served in the Illinois House of Representatives from 1961 to 1981 and was a Republican. He later served on the Illinois Regional Transportation Authority and the Illinois Prisoner Review Board. His uncle Arthur J. Bidwill and his brother Richard A. Walsh also served in the Illinois General Assembly. He died in Oak Brook, Illinois of cancer.
