= Finger Lakes Times =

Upstate New York newspaper

- Type: Daily newspaper
- Owner: Community Media Group
- Publisher: Mike Cutillo
- News editor: Alan Brignall
- Founded: 1895
- Headquarters: 218 Genesee St., Geneva, NY
- Website: fltimes.com

Finger Lakes Times is an upstate New York daily (except Sunday) newspaper with 19th century roots under an earlier name, Geneva Times. Their information is picked up by other newspapers, including The New York Times.

== History ==
The first edition of Geneva Times was published on May 28, 1895. The newspaper's initial 19th-century name reflected a more local name, Geneva. In 1977 it was renamed for the region, whose name did not exist when the paper was founded.

In February 2024, the paper's Monday edition transitioned from print to digital only. In September 2026, the paper reduced its print schedule from six to three days a week.
