= Lamont Robinson =

American politician

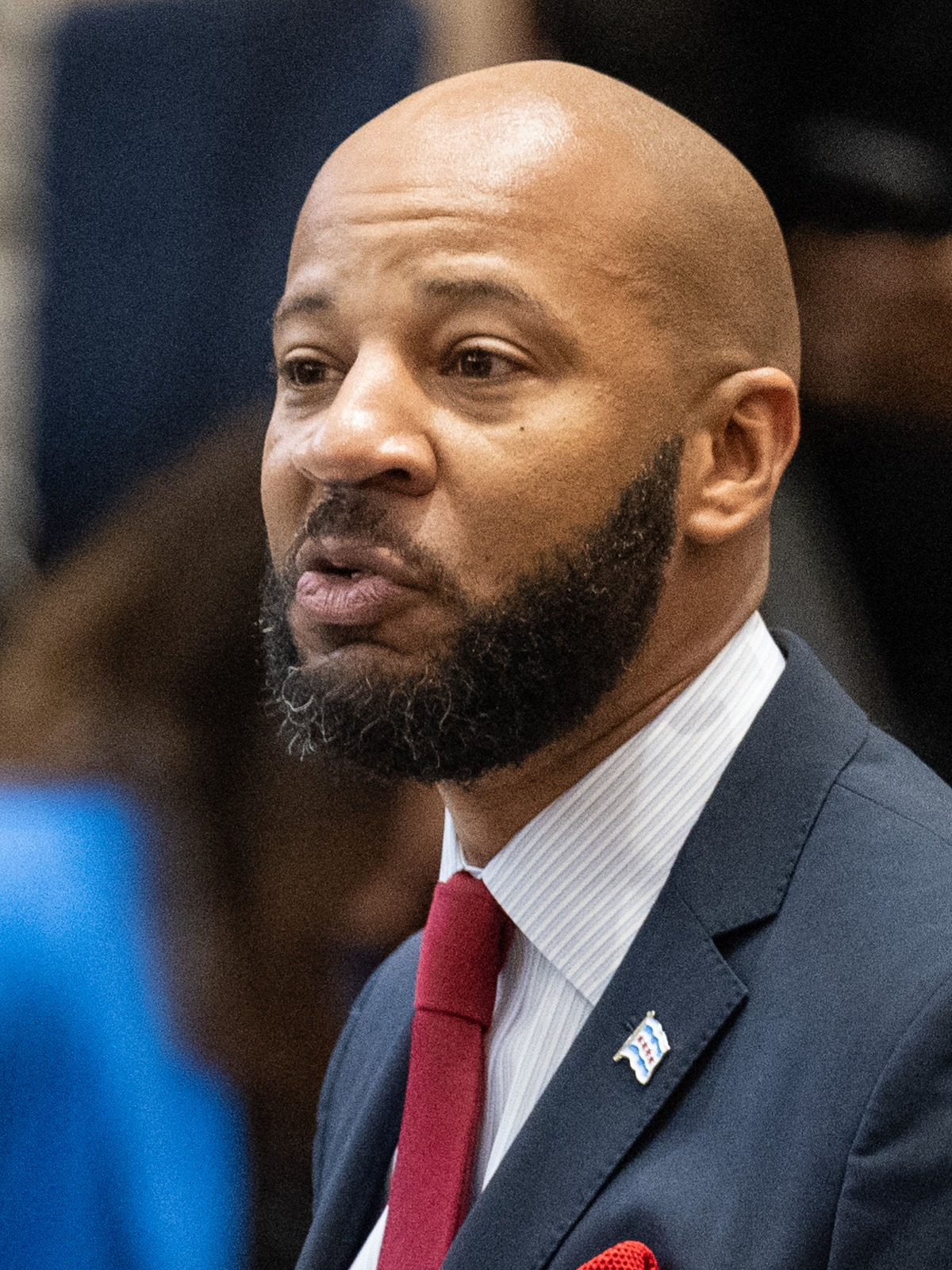
- Robinson in 2023

Member of the Chicago City Council from the 4th ward
- Incumbent
- Assumed office May 15, 2023
- Preceded by: Sophia King

Member of the Illinois House of Representatives from the 5th district
- In office January 2, 2019 – May 10, 2023
- Preceded by: Juliana Stratton
- Succeeded by: Kimberly du Buclet

Personal details
- Born: February 21, 1982 (age 44) Chicago, Illinois, U.S.
- Party: Democratic
- Education: Clark Atlanta University (BBA); National Louis University (MBA)

Lamont J. Robinson Jr. (born February 21, 1982) is an American insurance agent, educator, and politician who is the alderman for the 4th ward in the Chicago City Council, having won the 2023 election for the office. The 4th ward includes parts of the Douglas, Kenwood, and Near South Side neighborhoods.

From 2019 to 2023, he served as a state representative for the 5th district in the Illinois House of Representatives. The Chicago-based district included all or parts of the Near North Side, Chicago Loop, Near South Side, Douglas, Grand Boulevard, and Greater Grand Crossing.

He is openly gay and is the first openly LGBTQ African-American person to serve in the Illinois legislature.

== Early career and education ==
Robinson is the owner of two Allstate insurance agencies and is an adjunct professor at various City Colleges of Chicago campuses.

In 2019, Robinson completed Harvard Kennedy School's program for Senior Executives in State and Local Government as a David Bohnett Leadership Fellow.

== Illinois State Representative (2019-2023) ==
As of July 2, 2022, Representative Robinson was a member of the following committees:

- Appropriations - Human Services Committee (HAPH)
- (Chairman of) Cybersecurity, Data Analytics, & IT Committee (HCDA)
- Health Care Availability & Access Committee (HHCA)
- Prescription Drug Affordability Committee (HPDA)
- Public Utilities Committee (HPUB)
- Small Business, Tech Innovation, and Entrepreneurship Committee (SBTE)
- (Chairman of) Special Issues (AP) Subcommittee (HAPH-ISSU)
- Telecom/Video Subcommittee (HPUB-TVID)
- (Chairman of) Tourism Committee (SHTO)

== Chicago alderperson (2023–present) ==
In 2023 was elected to the Chicago City Council. Robinson was elected from a crowded field of candidates seeking to succeed incumbent 4th ward alder Sophia King after King opted against seeking re-election, in order to instead run in the coinciding mayoral election. In a runoff election, Robinson defeated Prentice Butler, King's chief of staff whom she had endorsed.

== Electoral history ==
2018 Illinois 5th Representative District Democratic primary
Party	Candidate	Votes	%
Democratic	Lamont Robinson	7,230	40.83
Democratic	Dilara Sayeed	4,844	27.36
Democratic	Ken Dunkin	3,246	18.33
Democratic	Felicia Bullock	2,387	13.48
Total votes		17,707	100.0

2018 Illinois House of Representatives 5th district general election
Party	Candidate	Votes	%
Democratic	Lamont Robinson	35,388	100.0
Total votes		35,388	100.0

2020 Illinois House of Representatives 5th district general election
Party	Candidate	Votes	%
Democratic	Lamont J. Robinson (incumbent)	43,918	100.0
Total votes		43,918	100.0

2022 Illinois House Representatives 5th district general election
Party	Candidate	Votes	%
Democratic	Lamont J. Robinson (incumbent)	23,847	100.0
Total votes		23,847	100.0

2023 Chicago City Council 4th Ward general election
Party	Candidate	Votes	%
Nonpartisan	Lamont Robinson	5,789	46.3
Nonpartisan	Prentice Butler	1,906	15.2
Nonpartisan	Ebony Lucas	1,802	14.4
Nonpartisan	Khari Humphries	1,175	9.4
Nonpartisan	Tracey Bey	1,145	9.2
Nonpartisan	Helen West	692	5.5
Total votes		12,509	100.0

2023 Chicago City Council 4th Ward runoff election
Party	Candidate	Votes	%
Nonpartisan	Lamont Robinson	8,861	66.32
Nonpartisan	Prentice C. Butler	4,499	33.68
Total votes		13,360	100.0

== See also ==
- List of Chicago alderpersons since 1923
