= Lovana Jones =

American politician (1938-2006)

- official portrait, 1987

Member of the Illinois House of Representatives
- In office 1987–2006
- Preceded by: Larry Bullock
- Succeeded by: Elga L. Jefferies
- Constituency: 23rd district 26th district

Personal details
- Born: March 28, 1938 Mansfield, Ohio
- Died: May 8, 2006 (aged 68)
- Party: Democratic
- Relatives: Brad Boyd (grandson)

Lovana S. "Lou" Jones (March 28, 1938 – May 8, 2006) served as an Illinois State Representative from 1987 until her death in 2006. She was known for speaking up for abused and neglected children.

== Biography ==
Born in Mansfield, Ohio, Jones went to Ohio State University. Jones was an employee of the City of Chicago Department of Human Services. Jones defeated incumbent Larry Bullock in the 1986 Democratic primary for the Illinois House of Representatives. She served in the state house until her death in 2006.

== Legacy ==
On April 3, 2011, a new Metra train station named after her, 35th Street/"Lou" Jones/Bronzeville station, was opened on the Rock Island District line.

== Personal life ==
Jones was the grandmother of Kansas State Representative Brad Boyd.
