= 2006 United States House of Representatives elections in Illinois =

- November 7, 2006

All 19 Illinois seats to the United States House of Representatives
	Majority party	Minority party
Party	Democratic	Republican
Last election	10	9
Seats won	10	9
Seat change	Steady	Steady
Popular vote	1,986,431	1,442,526
Percentage	57.53%	41.78%
Swing	▲3.9	▼3.76

Democratic
40–50%
50–60%
60–70%
70–80%
80–90%
90–100%
Republican
50–60%
60–70%
70–80%

The 2006 congressional elections in Illinois were held November 7, 2006, to determine who would represent the State of Illinois in the United States House of Representatives.

Illinois had nineteen seats in the House, apportioned according to the 2000 United States census. Representatives are elected for two-year terms; those elected would serve in the 110th Congress from January 3, 2007, to January 3, 2009.

== Overview ==
2006 United States House of Representatives elections in Illinois
Party	Votes	Percentage	Seats	+/–
Democratic	1,986,431	57.53%	10	—
Republican	1,442,526	41.78%	9	—
Independents	23,624	0.68%	0	—
Totals	3,452,581	100.00%	19	—

== District 1 ==
2006 Illinois's 1st congressional district election
- November 7, 2006
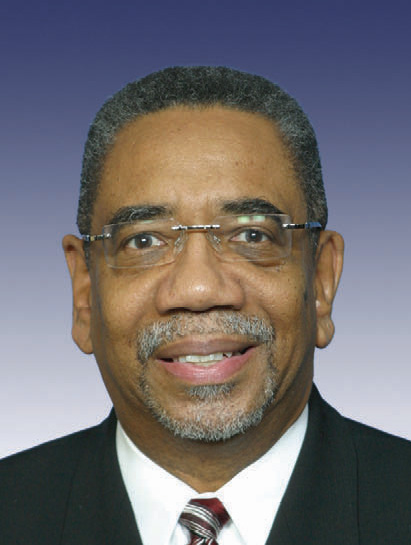

Nominee	Bobby Rush	Jason Tabour
Party	Democratic	Republican
Popular vote	146,623	27,804
Percentage	84.06%	15.94%
- County results Rush: 80–90%
U.S. Representative before election
Bobby Rush
Democratic
Elected U.S. Representative
Bobby Rush
Democratic

This district, one of the most heavily Democratic in Illinois and the country, has been represented by Democratic Congressman Bobby Rush since his initial election in 1992. This district is known for having the largest percentage of African-Americans of all congressional districts nationwide; true to the nature of this district, Rush is an African-American. Facing Republican nominee Jason Tabour, Rush easily achieved an eighth term in Congress.

=== Predictions ===
Source	Ranking	As of
The Cook Political Report	Safe D	November 6, 2006
Rothenberg	Safe D	November 6, 2006
Sabato's Crystal Ball	Safe D	November 6, 2006
Real Clear Politics	Safe D	November 7, 2006
CQ Politics	Safe D	November 7, 2006

2006 Illinois's 1st congressional district election
Party	Candidate	Votes	%
Democratic	Bobby Rush (incumbent)	146,623	84.06
Republican	Jason E. Tabour	27,804	15.94
Total votes		174,427	100.00
Democratic hold			

== District 2 ==
2006 Illinois's 2nd congressional district election
- November 7, 2006
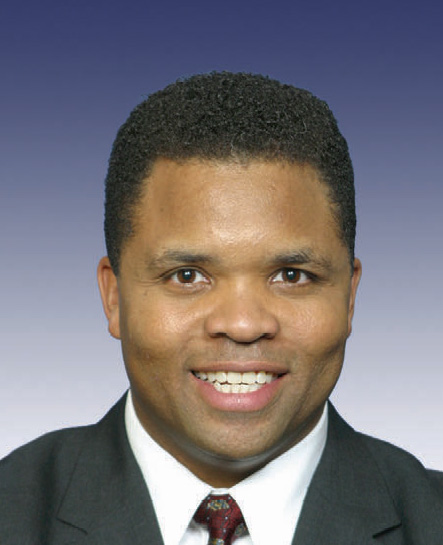

Nominee	Jesse Jackson Jr.	Robert Belin
Party	Democratic	Republican
Popular vote	146,347	20,395
Percentage	84.84%	11.82%
- County results Jackson: 80–90%
U.S. Representative before election
Jesse Jackson Jr.
Democratic
Elected U.S. Representative
Jesse Jackson Jr.
Democratic

Initially elected in a special election in 1995 to replace disgraced Congressman Mel Reynolds, Jesse Jackson Jr. has been subsequently re-elected by wide margins in this very liberal district, based in the southeastern portion of Chicago and some of the southern Chicagoan suburbs. This election proved to be no different, and Jackson stomped Republican opponent Robert Belin and Libertarian opponent Anthony Williams to win another term.

=== Predictions ===
Source	Ranking	As of
The Cook Political Report	Safe D	November 6, 2006
Rothenberg	Safe D	November 6, 2006
Sabato's Crystal Ball	Safe D	November 6, 2006
Real Clear Politics	Safe D	November 7, 2006
CQ Politics	Safe D	November 7, 2006

2006 Illinois's 2nd congressional district election
Party	Candidate	Votes	%
Democratic	Jesse Jackson Jr. (incumbent)	146,347	84.84
Republican	Robert Belin	20,395	11.82
Libertarian	Anthony W. Williams	5,748	3.33
Total votes		172,490	100.00
Democratic hold			

== District 3 ==
2006 Illinois's 3rd congressional district election
- November 7, 2006
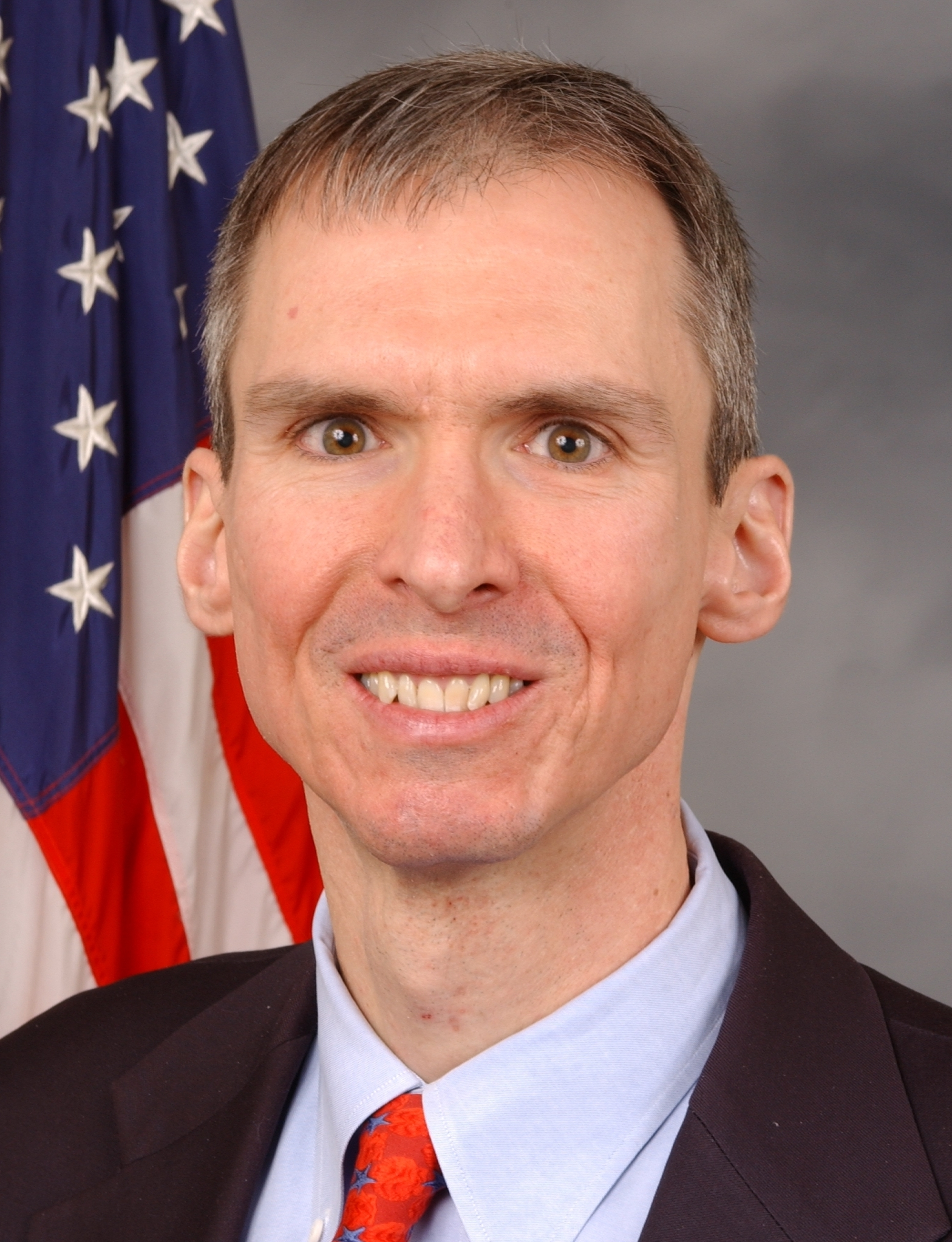

Nominee	Dan Lipinski	Raymond Wardingley
Party	Democratic	Republican
Popular vote	127,768	37,954
Percentage	77.10%	22.90%
- County results Lipinski: 70–80%
U.S. Representative before election
Dan Lipinski
Democratic
Elected U.S. Representative
Dan Lipinski
Democratic

In this solidly liberal district, based in the southwestern territory of Chicago and western suburbs of Chicago, has a record of sending socially conservative Democrats to Congress—incumbent Democratic Congressman Dan Lipinski has proved no different. Following the retirement of his father, long-serving Congressman Bill Lipinski, Dan Lipinski was elected to Congress in 2004 and faced his first re-election campaign in 2006. Lipinski easily defeated Republican challenger Raymond Wardingley to win a second term.

=== Predictions ===
Source	Ranking	As of
The Cook Political Report	Safe D	November 6, 2006
Rothenberg	Safe D	November 6, 2006
Sabato's Crystal Ball	Safe D	November 6, 2006
Real Clear Politics	Safe D	November 7, 2006
CQ Politics	Safe D	November 7, 2006

2006 Illinois's 3rd congressional district election
Party	Candidate	Votes	%
Democratic	Dan Lipinski (incumbent)	127,768	77.10
Republican	Raymond G. Wardingley	37,954	22.90
Total votes		165,722	100.00
Democratic hold			

== District 4 ==
2006 Illinois's 4th congressional district election
- November 7, 2006
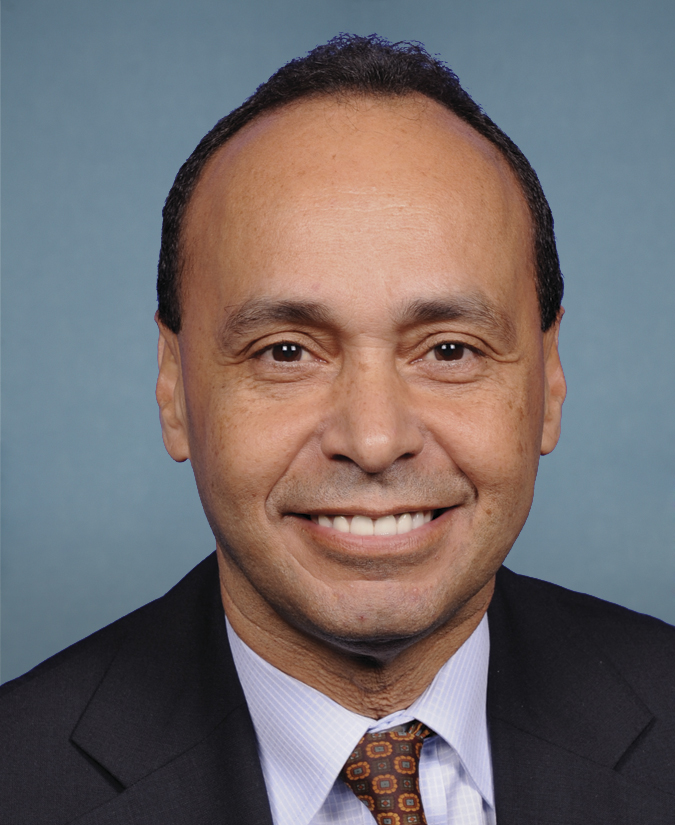

Nominee	Luis Gutiérrez	Ann Melichar
Party	Democratic	Republican
Popular vote	69,910	11,532
Percentage	85.84%	14.16%
- County results Gutierrez: 80–90%
U.S. Representative before election
Luis Gutiérrez
Democratic
Elected U.S. Representative
Luis Gutiérrez
Democratic

The district connects a northern section that is primarily composed of Puerto Ricans and a southern section that is made up of Mexican-Americans creating a Hispanic-American majority district. With the district continually sending incumbent Democratic Congressman Luis Gutierrez back to Congress by large margins. Seeking his eighth term, Gutierrez was victorious against Republican challenger Ann Melichar.

=== Predictions ===
Source	Ranking	As of
The Cook Political Report	Safe D	November 6, 2006
Rothenberg	Safe D	November 6, 2006
Sabato's Crystal Ball	Safe D	November 6, 2006
Real Clear Politics	Safe D	November 7, 2006
CQ Politics	Safe D	November 7, 2006

2006 Illinois's 4th congressional district election
Party	Candidate	Votes	%
Democratic	Luis Gutierrez (incumbent)	69,910	85.84
Republican	Ann Melichar	11,532	14.16
Total votes		81,442	100.00
Democratic hold			

== District 5 ==
2006 Illinois's 5th congressional district election
- November 7, 2006
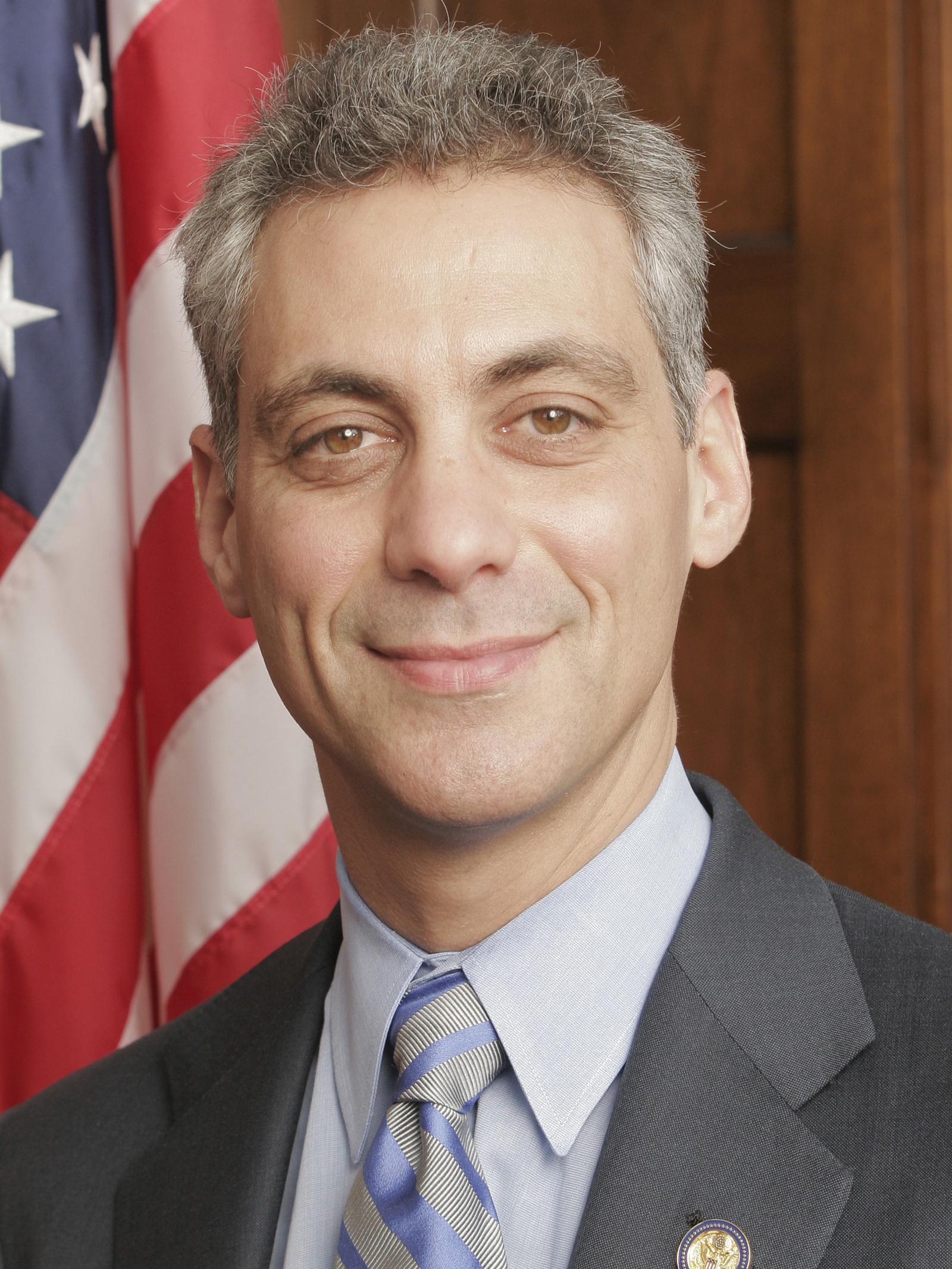

Nominee	Rahm Emanuel	Kevin White
Party	Democratic	Republican
Popular vote	114,319	32,250
Percentage	77.99%	22.00%
- County results Emanuel: 70–80%
U.S. Representative before election
Rahm Emanuel
Democratic
Elected U.S. Representative
Rahm Emanuel
Democratic

This district, currently located in the North Side of Chicago and the western Chicagoan suburbs, has been represented by, among others, Stephen A. Douglas and Rod Blagojevich before current Democratic Congressman Rahm Emanuel assumed office in 2002. Emanuel faced no real challenge from Republican opponent Kevin White due to the district's strong tendency towards the Democratic Party and was re-elected to a third term.

=== Predictions ===
Source	Ranking	As of
The Cook Political Report	Safe D	November 6, 2006
Rothenberg	Safe D	November 6, 2006
Sabato's Crystal Ball	Safe D	November 6, 2006
Real Clear Politics	Safe D	November 7, 2006
CQ Politics	Safe D	November 7, 2006

2006 Illinois's 5th congressional district election
Party	Candidate	Votes	%
Democratic	Rahm Emanuel (incumbent)	114,319	77.99
Republican	Kevin Edward White	32,250	22.00
Write-ins		12	0.01
Total votes		146,581	100.00
Democratic hold			

== District 6 ==
2006 Illinois's 6th congressional district election
- November 7, 2006
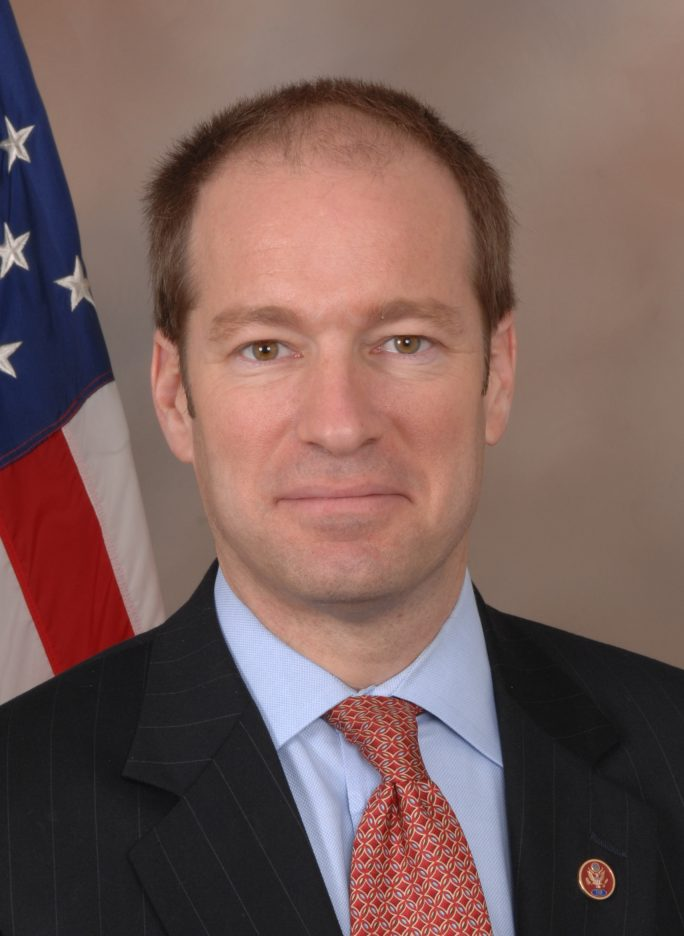

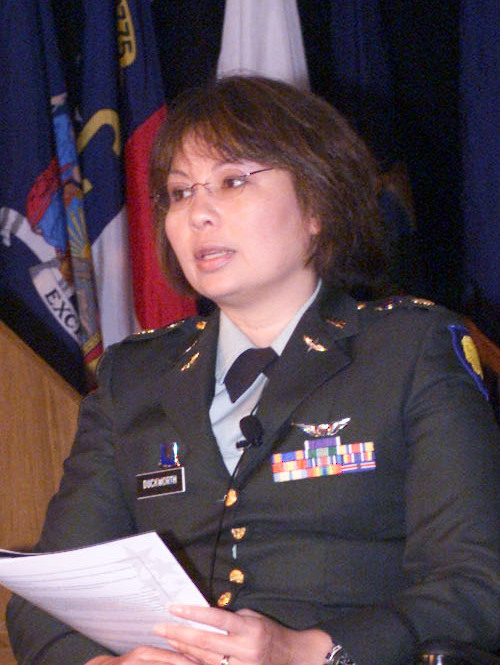
Nominee	Peter Roskam	Tammy Duckworth
Party	Republican	Democratic
Popular vote	91,382	86,572
Percentage	51.35%	48.65%
- County results Roskam: 50–60% Duckworth: 50–60%
U.S. Representative before election
Henry Hyde
Republican
Elected U.S. Representative
Peter Roskam
Republican

Long-serving incumbent Republican Congressman Henry Hyde declined to seek a seventeenth term in this moderate district based in the Chicago suburbs in DuPage County and Cook County, creating an open seat. State Senator Peter Roskam emerged as the Republican nominee while disabled Iraq War veteran Tammy Duckworth became the Democratic nominee. In a close election marked by special appearances from well-known politicians like John McCain, George W. Bush, and Dennis Hastert, Roskam ultimately edged out Duckworth by a thin margin, 51.3 to 48.7 percent, keeping district in Republican control. This would be one of the closest races in the 2006 house elections.

The party primaries for the election were held on March 21, 2006. The Republican nominee was Peter Roskam, an Illinois State Senator from the 48th district who lives in Wheaton, Illinois. Roskam ran unopposed in the primary.

The Democratic primary winner was Tammy Duckworth, a decorated Iraq War veteran. On March 21, 2006, Duckworth won the Democratic primary with 44 percent of the vote against 2004 Democratic nominee Christine Cegelis, who received 40 percent, and Wheaton College professor Lindy Scott, who received 16 percent. Duckworth is a resident of Hoffman Estates, Illinois. Although part of Hoffman Estates is within the sixth district, Duckworth lives three miles outside of the district. She lives in a disabled-accessible house which was refitted for her access by friends. The U.S. Constitution requires only that a member, when elected, be "an inhabitant of the state in which he shall be chosen." Illinois does not have a district residency requirement.

Duckworth had never held office, and the 2006 race was her first campaign.

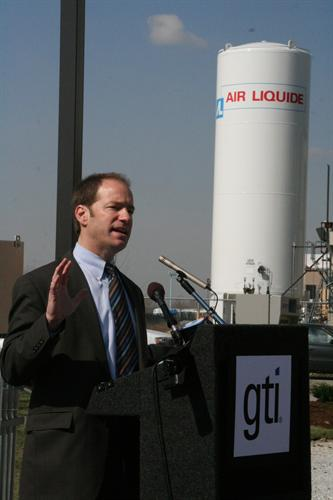
Peter Roskam

In May 2006, the Teamsters labor union endorsement of Roskam was announced by John Coli, President of Joint Council 25. The International Union of Operating Engineers Local 150 also endorsed Roskam for the congressional seat. The Veterans of Foreign Wars organization also endorsed Roskam over Duckworth.

Tammy Duckworth was endorsed by the Daily Herald, Chicago Tribune, the Chicago Sun-Times, and the Pioneer Press.

The candidates debated on WTTW/Channel 11 (October 23), WBEZ radio (October 19), WBBM radio (September 24), and at the College of DuPage (October 12).

In August 2006, the Roskam campaign used Republican Party stances for an American Association of Retired Persons (AARP) survey. The answers related to Medicare, Social Security, insurance plans and retirement. Democratic opponents characterized it as plagiarism.

On September 10, 2006, The St. Louis Post-Dispatch reported: "Roskam is trying to use immigration as an issue against his Democratic rival, Tammy Duckworth, in their race for the House seat being vacated by Republican Henry Hyde."

Controversy erupted on September 21, 2006, when the Duckworth campaign accused Roskam of using the term "cut-and-run" in reference to Duckworth's Iraq strategy. Roskam's campaign manager denied that they had made such a statement saying Roskam was "misquoted" and "misrepresented".

A fundraiser for Roskam and David McSweeney was held on October 12, 2006, at the Chicago Hilton. President George W. Bush and Speaker of the House Dennis Hastert headlined the event.

On October 24, actor and Parkinson's disease sufferer Michael J. Fox appeared at a fundraiser for Tammy Duckworth at Arrowhead Golf Course in Wheaton, supporting Duckworth's stance on embryonic stem cell research. Roskam held a simultaneous press conference featuring a cancer survivor who was treated with his own cells.

On October 30, Roskam attended a fundraiser with Senator John McCain. McCain had cosponsored the immigration bill that Roskam criticized as "amnesty". Roskam placed television ads that accused Duckworth of wanting to raise Social Security payroll taxes. According to the Daily Herald, the AARP mailed out thousands of letters to the Sixth District denouncing the ad as misleading.

In the week before the election, according to the Elk Grove Times, the National Republican Congressional Committee paid a Richmond, Virginia contractor to make automated phone calls (robocalls) to voters, criticising Tammy Duckworth's positions on issues, that began with "Hi. I'm calling with information about Tammy Duckworth..." and did not identify its source until late in the call. The Duckworth campaign said that the message's failure to identify its source made many people believe the message came from the Duckworth campaign, hurting its ability to speak to voters. The Duckworth campaign characterized the calls as harassment.

The Arlington Heights Daily Herald reported that the NRCC spent $9,000 on robocalls to help Peter Roskam in a single week. This translates into approximately 180,000 calls. The NRCC released a statement in response claiming the messages were in compliance with the law and compared them to similar ones made by DNC Counsel Joe Sandler. The Federal Trade Commission Telemarketing Sales Rule excludes political calls, since they are not included in the definition of telemarketing. No FCC or FTC fines have been issued for robocalls relating to the 6th district 2006 congressional campaign in Illinois.

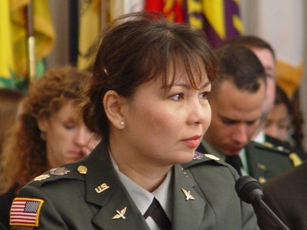
Tammy Duckworth

Roskam trailed Duckworth in fundraising. Roskam raised $3.44 million vs. Duckworth's $4.52 million, but started the fall campaign with more cash on hand, due in part to not having a primary challenger. Roskam was more dependent on contributions from PACs: 56 percent of Roskam's donations and 82 percent of Duckworth's donations came from individuals. 87 percent of Roskam's contributions and 51 percent of Duckworth's contributions came from the state of Illinois. Top zipcodes of contributors for Roskam were Wheaton, Glen Ellyn and Hinsdale. Duckworth's top zip codes were Chicago, Winnetka and New York City.

According to FEC filings, both candidates received donations from various political action committees. As of June 30, 2006, Roskam received more contributions from political committees formed by sitting legislators than any other non-incumbent Congressional candidate in the nation. A Roskam campaign spokesman credited House Speaker Dennis Hastert for those contributions.

=== Predictions ===
Source	Ranking	As of
The Cook Political Report	Tossup	November 6, 2006
Rothenberg	Tossup	November 6, 2006
Sabato's Crystal Ball	Tilt D (flip)	November 6, 2006
Real Clear Politics	Tossup	November 7, 2006
CQ Politics	Tossup	November 7, 2006

2006 Illinois's 6th congressional district election
Party	Candidate	Votes	%
Republican	Peter Roskam	91,382	51.35
Democratic	Tammy Duckworth	86,572	48.65
Write-ins		3	0.00
Total votes		177,957	100.00
Republican hold			

== District 7 ==
2006 Illinois's 7th congressional district election
- November 7, 2006
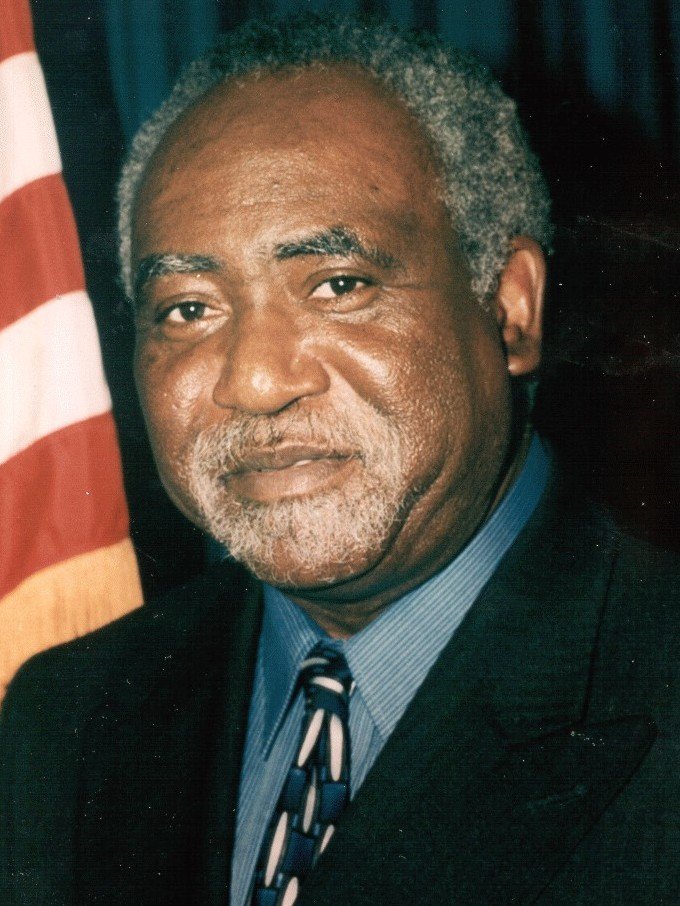

Nominee	Danny Davis	Charles Hutchinson
Party	Democratic	Republican
Popular vote	143,071	21,939
Percentage	86.70%	13.30%
- County results Davis: 80–90%
U.S. Representative before election
Danny Davis
Democratic
Elected U.S. Representative
Danny Davis
Democratic

Incumbent Democratic Congressman Danny K. Davis opted to run for a sixth term in the House of Representatives and did not face a serious challenge in this solidly liberal district based in southern and western Chicago and the western Chicagoan suburbs. Davis swamped Republican challenger Charles Hutchinson with well over eighty percent of the vote, securing another term in this African-American majority district.

=== Predictions ===
Source	Ranking	As of
The Cook Political Report	Safe D	November 6, 2006
Rothenberg	Safe D	November 6, 2006
Sabato's Crystal Ball	Safe D	November 6, 2006
Real Clear Politics	Safe D	November 7, 2006
CQ Politics	Safe D	November 7, 2006

2006 Illinois's 7th congressional district election
Party	Candidate	Votes	%
Democratic	Danny K. Davis (incumbent)	143,071	86.70
Republican	Charles Hutchinson	21,939	13.30
Total votes		165,010	100.00
Democratic hold			

== District 8 ==
2006 Illinois's 8th congressional district election
- November 7, 2006
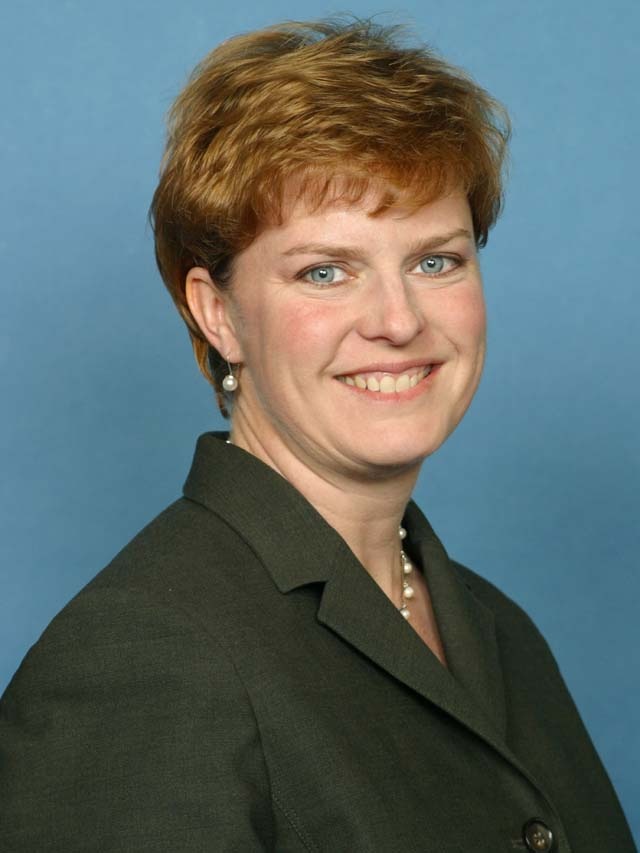

Nominee	Melissa Bean	David McSweeney	Bill Scheurer
Party	Democratic	Republican	Moderate
Popular vote	93,355	80,720	9,312
Percentage	50.90%	44.01%	5.08%
- County results Bean: 40–50% 50–60%
U.S. Representative before election
Melissa Bean
Democratic
Elected U.S. Representative
Melissa Bean
Democratic

In 2004, Democrat Melissa Bean had scored an upset to become the first Democratic representative from the district since its creation in 1935, even though President George W. Bush carried the district by a large margin. In 2006, Bean sought a second term and was opposed by investment banker David McSweeney. Though some anticipated a close race, Bean outlasted McSweeney by a comfortable margin, considering the district's moderate nature.

The 8th district election was unusual in several ways: The two main candidates in the election for the United States House of Representatives were incumbent Melissa Bean of the Democratic Party and Republican Party candidate David McSweeney, joined by third-party candidate Bill Scheurer, running as a self-proclaimed "moderate." McSweeney emerged as a candidate from a crowded and often brutal six-way Republican primary, and Bean was unopposed in the Democratic primary. As the 8th congressional district, covering parts of McHenry County, Cook County and most of Lake County, is considered to lean conservative, the United States Republican Party targeted the district as a high priority for recapture in the 2006 elections. However, Bean defeated McSweeney by a nearly five percent margin during a national election which proved unfavorable to Republicans nationwide.

The district had long leaned Republican. As of 2002, the district had been represented by Phil Crane for 33 years. Bean's 2004 victory was considered to be a decisive upset in a district once considered to be reliably conservative. Making Bean's victory even more important for the Democratic Party was that the Party lost seats in the House elsewhere in the country, meaning Bean's victory somewhat softened the Party's overall net defeat in the 2004 election, which saw the reelection of Republican President George W. Bush as well as a net Republican gain in both the House and the Senate. Given their overall dominance in the 2004 elections and a congressional district they still saw as conservative, the Republican Party marked Bean's district as one of their top priorities in the upcoming 2006 House elections. Republican challengers included David McSweeney, Kathy Salvi, Aaron Lincoln, Robert Churchill, Ken Arnold, and James Creighton Miller.

2006 8th district Republican primary results
	Vote total	Percentage
David McSweeney	24,613	42.751%
Kathy Salvi	19,084	33.147%
Robert W. Churchill	9,111	15.825%
Aaron Lincoln	2,598	4.512%
Ken Arnold	1,259	2.187%
James Creighton Miller	908	1.578%

The 2006 Republican primary for the 8th congressional district was highly contested, with six candidates. David McSweeney garnered 43% of the vote, winning by 10 points over his closest opponent, Kathy Salvi. During the course of the campaign the McSweeney and Salvi campaigns used negative ads against one another. Salvi criticized McSweeney, claiming he raised taxes two years in a row, increased spending by 28%, and added 20% more employees while serving as a Trustee for Palatine Township. McSweeney responded with a television ad stating "Kathy Salvi is lying".

In a Chicago Sun-Times article, movement conservative Tom Roeser wrote "Because McSweeney is a social conservative, the skittish Illinois establishment GOP would like to run someone else."

Congressman Mark Kirk (R) of the neighboring 10th district, supported Teresa Bartels, a moderate, during the Republican primary. Kirk believed that David McSweeney could not win the district, with a conservative being easily defeated by the incumbent Melissa Bean. However, Bartels dropped out before the primary. Kirk reluctantly supported David

Bill Scheurer, who had run as a Democrat in 2004, entered the race as an independent after he felt that both Melissa Bean and David McSweeney were too conservative. He criticized Bean more harshly in his campaign than he did McSweeney, asserting that Bean's frequent pro-business votes in Congress are an abandonment of Democratic Party ideals. The focus of Scheurer's campaign was fiscal issues: balancing the federal budget, fixing the United States health care system, and reducing the national debt.

Lynn Sweet, Washington bureau chief for the Chicago Sun-Times, reported in April 2006 that "the 8th District Bean-McSweeney race is one of a handful in the nation that could determine which party controls Congress."

In June 2006, the Cook Political Report, an independent non-partisan newsletter, rated the race for Illinois' 8th Congressional District as "Lean Democratic", meaning Melissa Bean had the advantage.

McSweeney is a conservative Republican. He supports finishing the war on terror and the Iraq War. McSweeney also promises to make President Bush's tax cuts permanent, to offer tax cuts to companies that invest in new jobs and workers. He is opposed to raising the federal minimum wage, currently $5.15 an hour. McSweeney vows to try and freeze the total amount of federal spending, excluding national security, homeland security, and social security. McSweeney opposes abortion except in cases of rape, incest, and when the life of the mother is at stake. McSweeney also opposes embryonic stem cell research, instead favoring research on umbilical cord blood. He supports 2nd Amendment rights and opposes a ban on semi-automatic firearms. McSweeney supports carrying concealed weapon. McSweeney opposes same-sex marriage as well as civil unions for gay couples and is in favor of amending the Constitution to ban sex same marriages. McSweeney argued that a wall should be built along part of the 2,000-plus-mile U.S.-Mexican border, focusing on the urban areas. McSweeney favored means-testing as a way to reduce the cost of Medicare Part D, which is the prescription drug benefit. McSweeney said, "I believe we need to means-test the Part D prescription drug program that was just adopted by Congress."

Bean won in each county in her district.

=== Endorsements ===
Melissa Bean (D)

Individuals

- Wesley Clark, General, 2004 democratic presidential candidate

==== Predictions ====
Source	Ranking	As of
The Cook Political Report	Lean D	November 6, 2006
Rothenberg	Tilt D	November 6, 2006
Sabato's Crystal Ball	Lean D	November 6, 2006
Real Clear Politics	Lean D	November 7, 2006
CQ Politics	Lean D	November 7, 2006

2006 Illinois's 8th congressional district election
Party	Candidate	Votes	%
Democratic	Melissa Bean (incumbent)	93,355	50.90
Republican	David McSweeney	80,720	44.01
Moderate	Bill Scheurer	9,319	5.08
Total votes		183,394	100.00
Democratic hold			

== District 9 ==
2006 Illinois's 9th congressional district election
- November 7, 2006
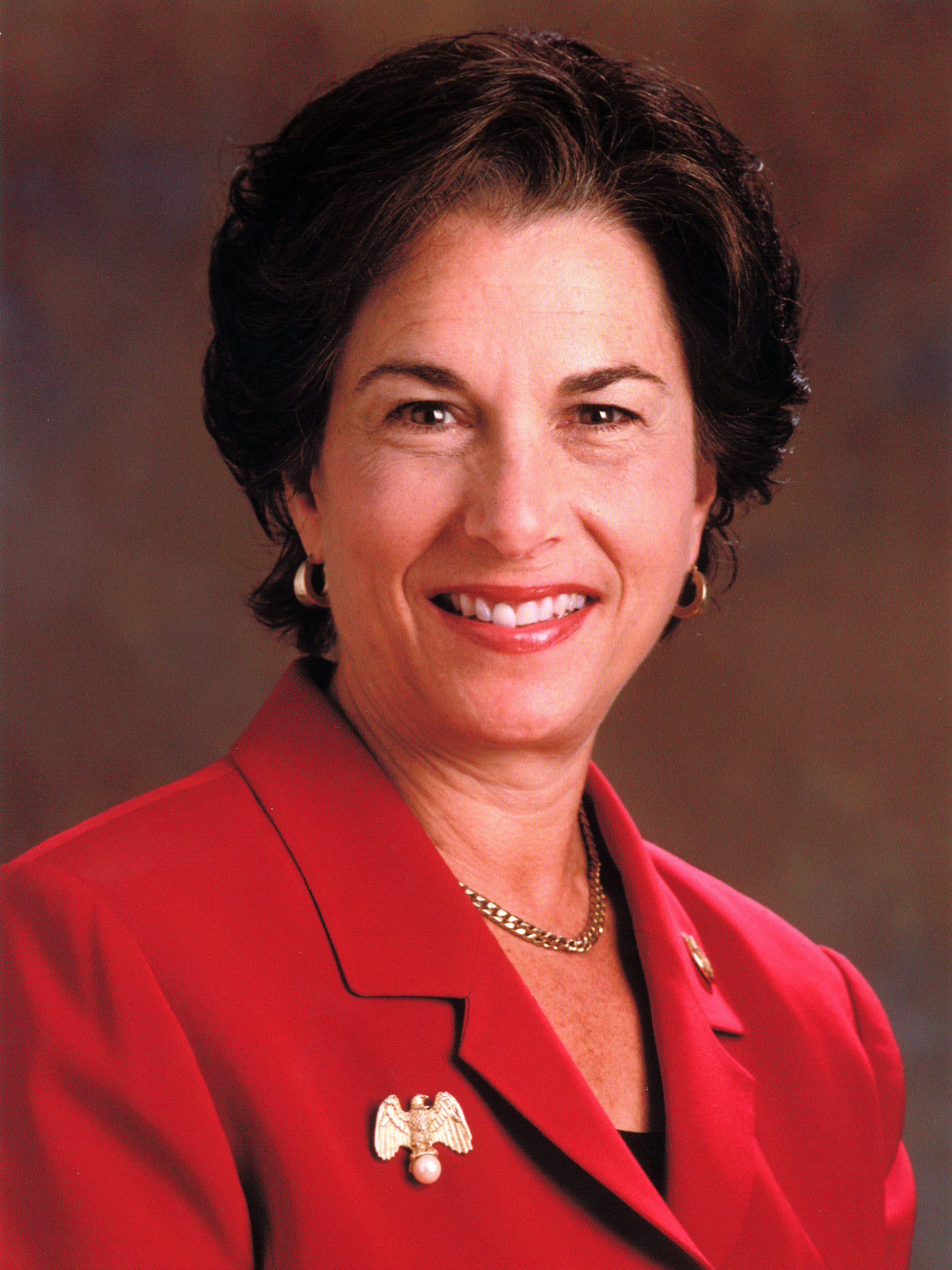

Nominee	Jan Schakowsky	Michael Shannon
Party	Democratic	Republican
Popular vote	122,852	41,858
Percentage	74.59%	25.41%
- County results Schakowsky: 70–80%
U.S. Representative before election
Jan Schakowsky
Democratic
Elected U.S. Representative
Jan Schakowsky
Democratic

Incumbent Democratic Congresswoman Jan Schakowsky, seeking her fifth term in Congress, did not face a serious challenge in this consistently liberal district based in the North Side of Chicago and the northern Chicagoan suburbs. True to the district's history of electing Democrats, Schakowsky slammed Republican opponent Michael Shannon with nearly seventy-five percent of the vote.

=== Predictions ===
Source	Ranking	As of
The Cook Political Report	Safe D	November 6, 2006
Rothenberg	Safe D	November 6, 2006
Sabato's Crystal Ball	Safe D	November 6, 2006
Real Clear Politics	Safe D	November 7, 2006
CQ Politics	Safe D	November 7, 2006

2006 Illinois's 9th congressional district election
Party	Candidate	Votes	%
Democratic	Jan Schakowsky (incumbent)	122,852	74.59
Republican	Michael P. Shannon	41,858	25.41
Total votes		164,710	100.00
Democratic hold			

== District 10 ==
2006 Illinois's 10th congressional district election
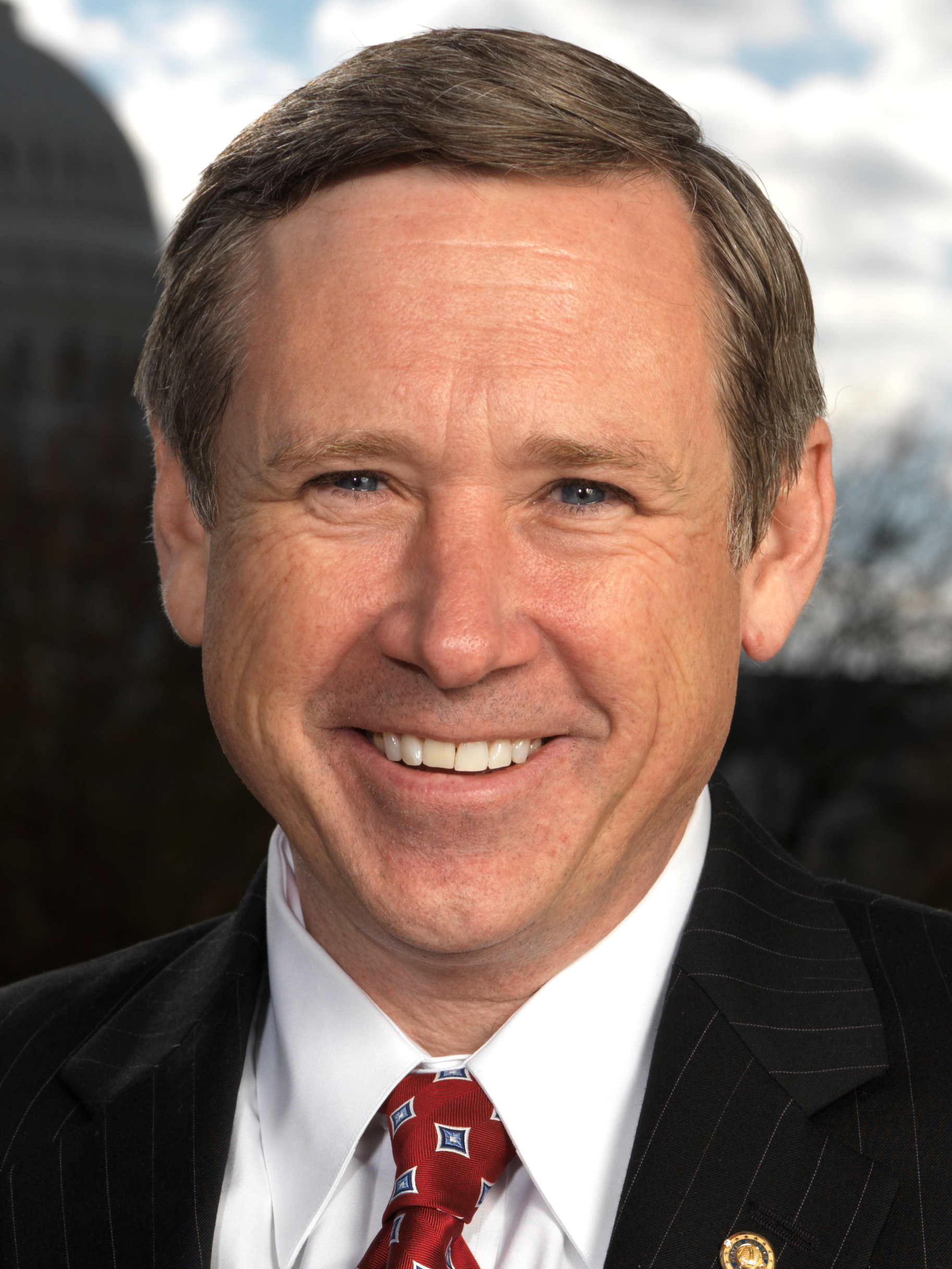

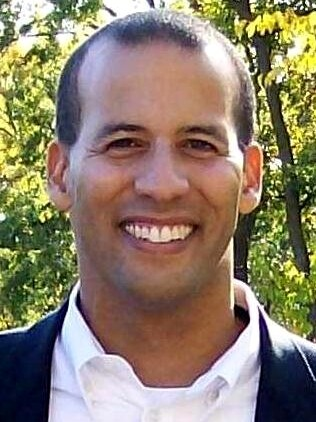
Nominee	Mark Kirk	Dan Seals
Party	Republican	Democratic
Popular vote	107,929	94,278
Percentage	53.4%	46.6%
- County results Kirk: 50–60%
U.S. Representative before election
Mark Kirk
Republican
Elected U.S. Representative
Mark Kirk
Republican

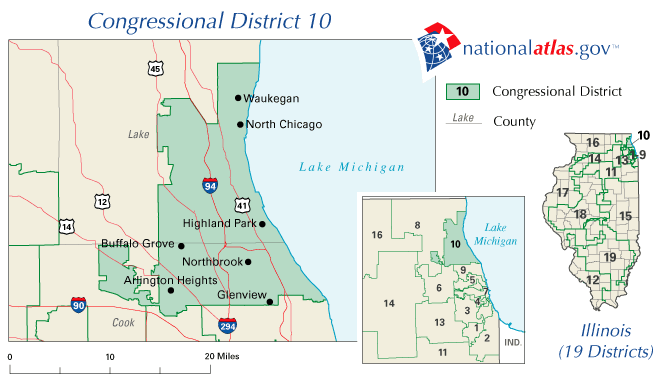

Initially elected in 2000, incumbent Republican Congressman Mark Kirk built a reputation as being a moderate Republican, the kind of Republican that this liberal-leaning district in the northern suburbs of Chicago would elect. Facing off against Democratic challenger and businessman Dan Seals, Kirk experienced a serious challenge. Seals was able to remain competitive against Kirk for most of the campaign, abetted by the Democratic wave sweeping the country, but he ultimately fell to the incumbent Republican and lost by around thirteen thousand votes and seven points. The district was located in the northern suburbs of Chicago in Cook and Lake counties, along Lake Michigan. Although reliably Republican in past elections, particularly before the latest redistricting, it voted for John Kerry in 2004, which made re-election in 2006 a challenge for Republican incumbent Mark Kirk.

Democratic hopes for winning here rose after Melissa Bean's win in the neighboring 8th District, which is more Republican. The Democratic candidate was GE Commercial Finance Director of Marketing Dan Seals. Seals raised $1,918,167 to Kirk's $3,168,367. Daniel "Dan" Seals is a native of Chicago. He lives in Wilmette, Illinois (one half-block outside of the 10th district) with his wife Mia (maiden name: Miyako Hasegawa) and their three young daughters. Seals taught high school English in Japan before earning a Master's in Public Policy at the Johns Hopkins School of Advanced International Studies.

Seals was a Presidential Management Fellow during the Clinton Administration and worked on trade issues to increase overseas markets for U.S. goods. He also spent time on Capitol Hill, serving as a fellow in the office of Connecticut Senator Joe Lieberman, where his primary focus was on economic development and policy. Seals earned his M.B.A. from the University of Chicago. He was on leave from his position as Director of Marketing at GE Commercial Finance while he campaigned full-time. He is now self-employed as a consultant. Seals ran on a platform of fiscal responsibility, pragmatic energy independence solutions, universal access to health care for the 46 million uninsured Americans, and a withdrawal of U.S. troops from Iraq. In March 2006, Seals won the Democratic Primary with 70% of the vote.

Mark Kirk is a graduate of Cornell, the London School of Economics, and Georgetown University where he earned his JD. Moreover, Kirk has worked at the U.S. Department of State, the World Bank, and Baker & McKenzie. Kirk is the head of the Moderate Republican caucus. He was also Assistant Majority Whip until the Republican Party lost control of the House of Representatives in the November 2006 election. He claims to be fiscally conservative, but pro-choice and pro-environment. Kirk was endorsed in the 2006 election by all major local newspapers including The Daily Herald, the Chicago Tribune, the Chicago Sun-Times, and the Lake County News Sun. He was also endorsed by the U.S. Chamber of Commerce and Planned Parenthood. In his most difficult race since 2000, Kirk prevailed by a 53% to 47% margin.

=== Predictions ===
Source	Ranking	As of
The Cook Political Report	Likely R	November 6, 2006
Rothenberg	Safe R	November 6, 2006
Sabato's Crystal Ball	Lean R	November 6, 2006
Real Clear Politics	Safe R	November 7, 2006
CQ Politics	Likely R	November 7, 2006

2006 Illinois's 10th congressional district election
Party	Candidate	Votes	%
Republican	Mark Kirk (incumbent)	107,929	53.38
Democratic	Dan Seals	94,278	46.62
Total votes		202,207	100.00
Republican hold			

== District 11 ==
2006 Illinois's 11th congressional district election
- November 7, 2006
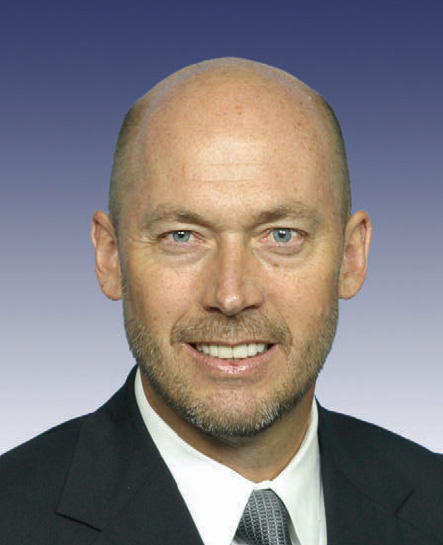

Nominee	Jerry Weller	John Pavich
Party	Republican	Democratic
Popular vote	109,009	88,846
Percentage	55.10%	44.90%
- County results Weller: 50–60% 60–70% 70–80%
U.S. Representative before election
Jerry Weller
Republican
Elected U.S. Representative
Jerry Weller
Republican

Republican Jerry Weller, who was part of the 1994 Republican Revolution in which the GOP took control of Congress had been re-elected with 59% of the vote in 2004. In this conservative-leaning district, Weller experienced a more serious challenge from Democratic challenger John Pavich than he was used to. The 11th stretches from the southern suburbs of Chicago to Bureau County and then dips down into Bloomington and Normal. True to the district's conservative tilt, however, Weller defeated Pavich, 55% to 45%, a narrower margin than expected.

Weller was a staff member for state representative Tom Corcoran from 1980 to 1981, assistant to the director of the Illinois Department of Agriculture and an aide to Secretary of Agriculture John R. Block from 1981 to 1985. In 1988, Weller was elected to the Illinois House of Representatives where he served until 1994. Weller was elected to the U.S. House of Representatives in 1994 following the retirement of Democrat George Sangmeister. Weller defeated New Lenox attorney Robert T. Herbolsheimer in the Republican primary, and Democrat Frank Giglio in the general election.

John J. Pavich was an American attorney who served on the legal defense team of former Bosnia and Herzegovina and Republika Srpska president Biljana Plavšić before the International Criminal Tribunal for the former Yugoslavia (ICTY). Pavich's father served as lead counsel for Dr. Plavšić. After the 9/11 events, Pavich joined the Central Intelligence Agency, working in counterterrorism for the National Clandestine Service from 2003 to 2005. Pavich then returned to Illinois to practice law and start a family. He and his wife and their one-year-old son currently reside in Beecher, Illinois.

=== Predictions ===
Source	Ranking	As of
The Cook Political Report	Safe R	November 6, 2006
Rothenberg	Safe R	November 6, 2006
Sabato's Crystal Ball	Safe R	November 6, 2006
Real Clear Politics	Safe R	November 7, 2006
CQ Politics	Safe R	November 7, 2006

2006 Illinois's 11th congressional district election
Party	Candidate	Votes	%
Republican	Jerry Weller (incumbent)	109,009	55.10
Democratic	John Pavich	88,846	44.90
Total votes		197,855	100.00
Republican hold			

== District 12 ==
2006 Illinois's 12th congressional district election
- November 7, 2006
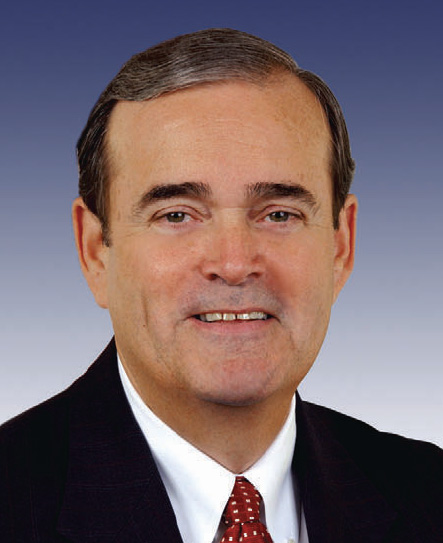
Nominee	Jerry Costello
Party	Democratic
Popular vote	157,802
Percentage	99.99%
- County results Costello: >90%
U.S. Representative before election
Jerry Costello
Democratic
Elected U.S. Representative
Jerry Costello
Democratic

Other than the 7 write-in votes Costello was re-elected with nearly 100% of the vote.

=== Predictions ===
Source	Ranking	As of
The Cook Political Report	Safe D	November 6, 2006
Rothenberg	Safe D	November 6, 2006
Sabato's Crystal Ball	Safe D	November 6, 2006
Real Clear Politics	Safe D	November 7, 2006
CQ Politics	Safe D	November 7, 2006

2006 Illinois's 12th congressional district election
Party	Candidate	Votes	%
Democratic	Jerry Costello (incumbent)	157,284	100.00
Write-ins		7	0.00
Total votes		157,291	100.00
Democratic hold			

== District 13 ==
2006 Illinois's 13th congressional district election
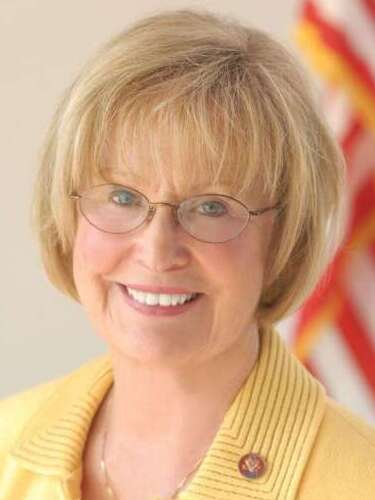

Nominee	Judy Biggert	Joseph Shannon
Party	Republican	Democratic
Popular vote	119,720	85,507
Percentage	58.3%	41.7%
- County results Biggert: 50–60% 60–70%
U.S. Representative before election
Judy Biggert
Republican
Elected U.S. Representative
Judy Biggert
Republican

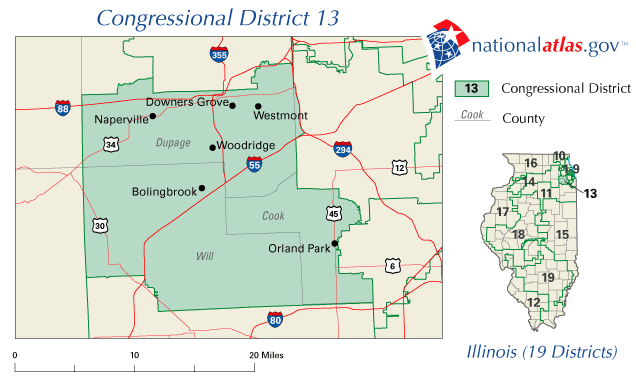

In this compact district based in the southwest suburbs of Chicago, incumbent Republican Congresswoman Judy Biggert sought a fifth term. Biggert has typically enjoyed wide margins of victory in this moderately conservative district, and this year proved no different. Biggert defeated Democratic challenger Joseph Shannon by a seventeen-point margin—a wide margin, no doubt, but thinner than what Biggert received before.

=== Predictions ===
Source	Ranking	As of
The Cook Political Report	Safe R	November 6, 2006
Rothenberg	Safe R	November 6, 2006
Sabato's Crystal Ball	Safe R	November 6, 2006
Real Clear Politics	Safe R	November 7, 2006
CQ Politics	Safe R	November 7, 2006

2006 Illinois's 13th congressional district election
Party	Candidate	Votes	%
Republican	Judy Biggert (incumbent)	119,720	58.34
Democratic	Joseph Shannon	85,507	41.66
Total votes		205,227	100.00
Republican hold			

== District 14 ==
2006 Illinois's 14th congressional district election
- November 7, 2006
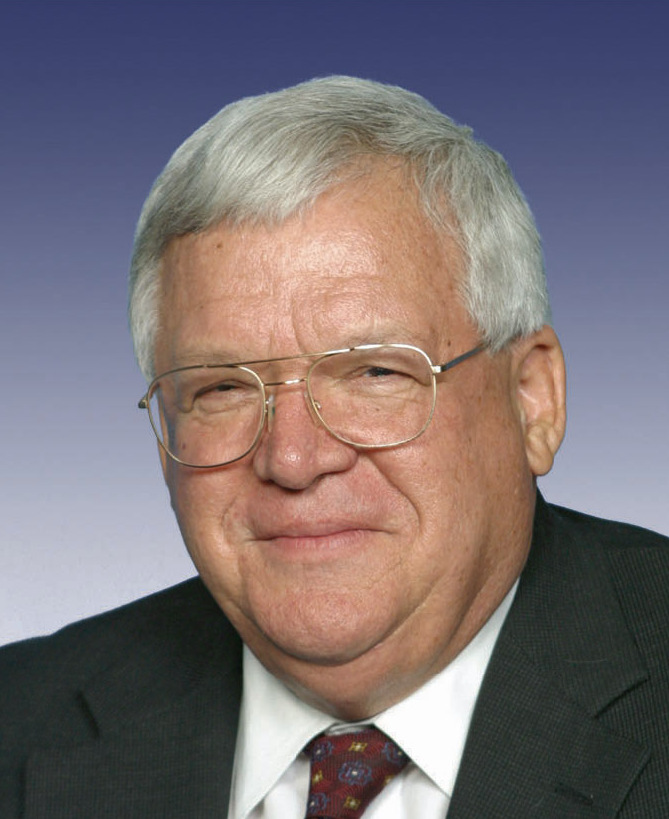

Nominee	Dennis Hastert	John Laesch
Party	Republican	Democratic
Popular vote	117,870	79,274
Percentage	59.79%	40.21%
- County results Hastert: 50–60% 60–70% Laesch: 50–60%
U.S. Representative before election
Dennis Hastert
Republican
Elected U.S. Representative
Dennis Hastert
Republican

Incumbent Republican Congressman Dennis Hastert, the Speaker of the House since 1999, has represented this conservative-leaning district since his initial election in 1986. Hastert faced off against Democratic challenger John Laesch in the general election and, true to this northern Illinois district's conservative history, defeated him by a wide margin.

=== Endorsements ===
John Laesch (D)

Individuals

- Wesley Clark, General, 2004 democratic presidential candidate

==== Predictions ====
Source	Ranking	As of
The Cook Political Report	Safe R	November 6, 2006
Rothenberg	Safe R	November 6, 2006
Sabato's Crystal Ball	Safe R	November 6, 2006
Real Clear Politics	Safe R	November 7, 2006
CQ Politics	Safe R	November 7, 2006

2006 Illinois's 14th congressional district election
Party	Candidate	Votes	%
Republican	Dennis Hastert (incumbent)	117,870	59.79
Democratic	John Laesch	79,274	40.21
Total votes		197,144	100.00
Republican hold			

== District 15 ==
2006 Illinois's 15th congressional district election
- November 7, 2006
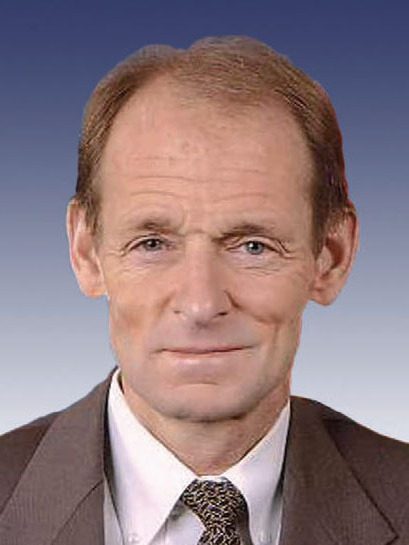

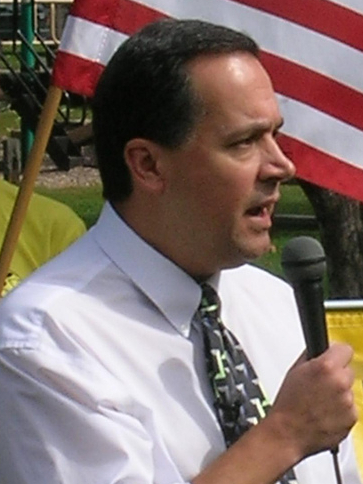
Nominee	Tim Johnson	David Gill
Party	Republican	Democratic
Popular vote	116,810	86,025
Percentage	57.59%	42.41%
- County results Johnson: 50–60% 60–70% 70–80% Gill: 50–60% 60–70%
U.S. Representative before election
Tim Johnson
Republican
Elected U.S. Representative
Tim Johnson
Republican

Incumbent Republican Congressman Tim Johnson, who has represented this district since 2000, sought a fourth term this year. The 15th district, which includes much of eastern Illinois and stretches into southern Illinois, is one of the most conservative districts in Illinois, and as such, Johnson did not experience a particularly tough challenge from Democratic opponent David Gill.

=== Predictions ===
Source	Ranking	As of
The Cook Political Report	Safe R	November 6, 2006
Rothenberg	Safe R	November 6, 2006
Sabato's Crystal Ball	Safe R	November 6, 2006
Real Clear Politics	Safe R	November 7, 2006
CQ Politics	Safe R	November 7, 2006

2006 Illinois's 15th congressional district election
Party	Candidate	Votes	%
Republican	Tim Johnson (incumbent)	116,810	57.59
Democratic	David Gill	86,025	42.41
Total votes		202,835	100.00
Republican hold			

== District 16 ==
2006 Illinois's 16th congressional district election
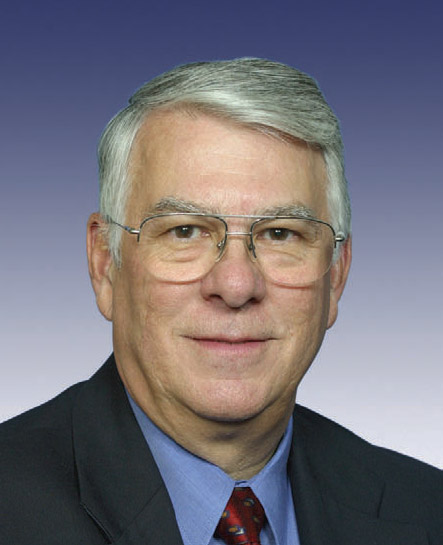

Nominee	Donald Manzullo	Richard D. Auman
Party	Republican	Democratic
Popular vote	125,508	63,462
Percentage	63.5%	32.1%
- County results Manzullo: 50–60% 60–70% 70–80%
U.S. Representative before election
Donald Manzullo
Republican
Elected U.S. Representative
Donald Manzullo
Republican

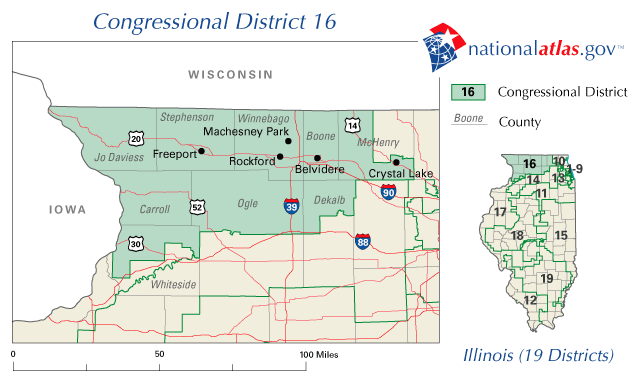

In this conservative-leaning district based in northern Illinois, incumbent Republican Congressman Donald Manzullo has not experienced a serious challenge since his initial election in 1992, and this year proved no different. Manzullo crushed Democratic opponent Richard Auman and independent challenger John Borling with nearly sixty-five percent of the vote and won an eighth term in Congress.

=== Predictions ===
Source	Ranking	As of
The Cook Political Report	Safe R	November 6, 2006
Rothenberg	Safe R	November 6, 2006
Sabato's Crystal Ball	Safe R	November 6, 2006
Real Clear Politics	Safe R	November 7, 2006
CQ Politics	Safe R	November 7, 2006

2006 Illinois's 16th congressional district election
Party	Candidate	Votes	%
Republican	Donald Manzullo (incumbent)	125,508	63.55
Democratic	Richard D. Auman	63,462	32.13
Independent	John Borling	8,523	4.32
Total votes		197,493	100.00
Republican hold			

== District 17 ==
2006 Illinois's 17th congressional district election
- November 7, 2006
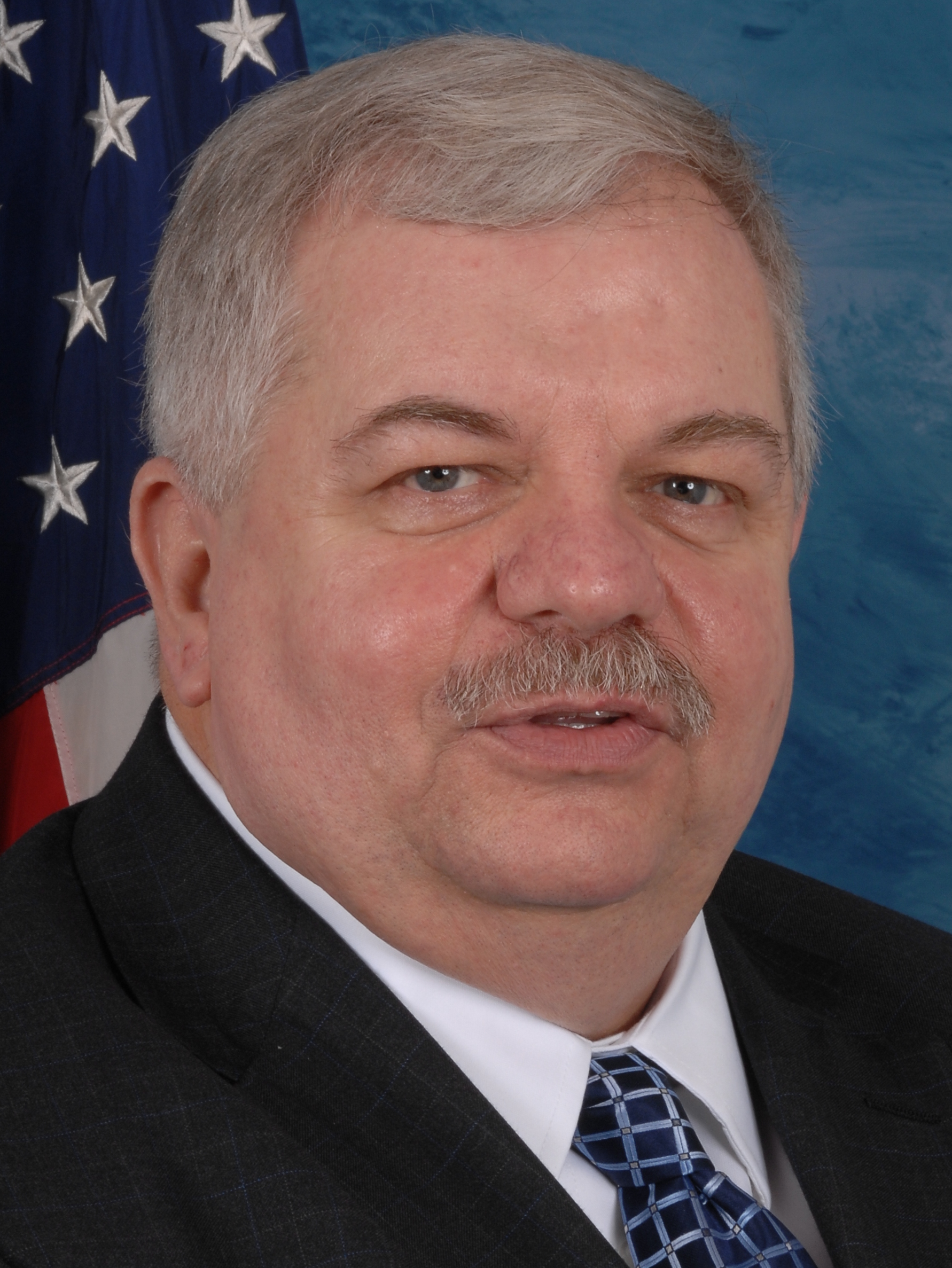

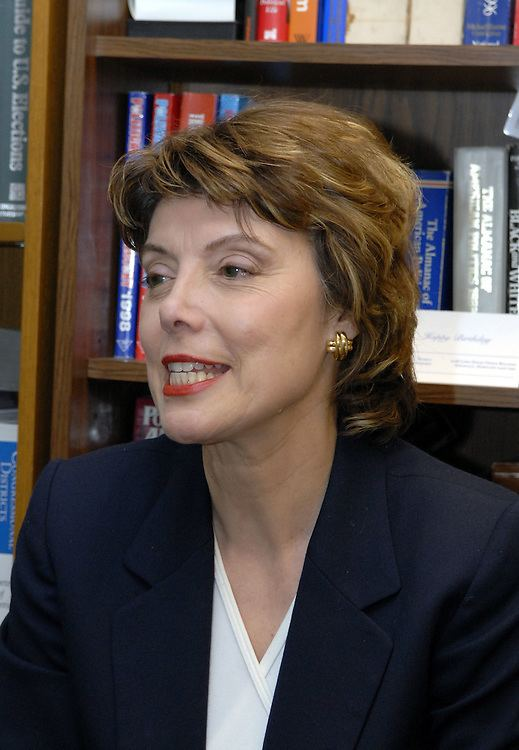
Nominee	Phil Hare	Andrea Zinga
Party	Democratic	Republican
Popular vote	115,025	86,161
Percentage	57.17%	42.83%
- County results Hare: 50–60% 60–70% Zinga: 50–60% 60–70%
U.S. Representative before election
Lane Evans
Democratic
Elected U.S. Representative
Phil Hare
Democratic

This strangely shaped district constitutes much of western and central Illinois and was gerrymandered to protect incumbent Democratic Congressman Lane Evans. Evans planned on seeking a thirteenth term in Congress this year, but was forced to retire due to the increasingly debilitating effects of Parkinson's disease. Evans' longtime Chief-of-Staff, Phil Hare, was selected as the Democratic nominee in his place and faced off against previous Congressional candidate and former television reporter Andrea Zinga in the general election, which he won handily.

=== Endorsements ===
Phil Hare (D)

Individuals

- Wesley Clark, General, 2004 democratic presidential candidate

==== Predictions ====
Source	Ranking	As of
The Cook Political Report	Likely D	November 6, 2006
Rothenberg	Safe D	November 6, 2006
Sabato's Crystal Ball	Safe D	November 6, 2006
Real Clear Politics	Safe D	November 7, 2006
CQ Politics	Likely D	November 7, 2006

==== Election Results ====
2006 Illinois's 17th congressional district election
Party	Candidate	Votes	%
Democratic	Phil Hare	115,025	57.17
Republican	Andrea Zinga	86,161	42.83
Total votes		201,186	100.00
Democratic hold			

== District 18 ==
2006 Illinois's 18th congressional district election
- November 7, 2006
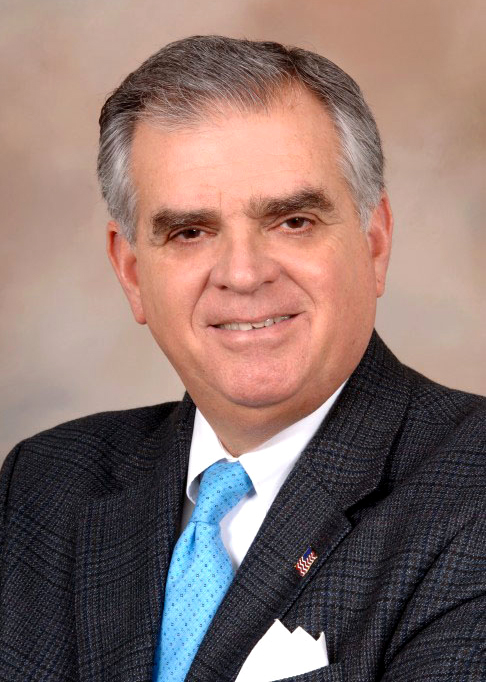

Nominee	Ray LaHood	Steve Waterworth
Party	Republican	Democratic
Popular vote	150,194	73,052
Percentage	67.28%	32.72%
- County results LaHood: 50–60% 60–70% 70–80% Waterworth: 50–60%
U.S. Representative before election
Ray LaHood
Republican
Elected U.S. Representative
Ray LaHood
Republican

This solidly conservative district based in western and central Illinois has been represented by incumbent Republican Congressman Ray LaHood since 1995 and has consistently given him comfortable margins of re-election. This year, despite the anti-Republican sentiment nationwide, LaHood was able to swamp Democratic opponent Steve Waterworth with nearly seventy percent of the vote.

=== Predictions ===
Source	Ranking	As of
The Cook Political Report	Safe R	November 6, 2006
Rothenberg	Safe R	November 6, 2006
Sabato's Crystal Ball	Safe R	November 6, 2006
Real Clear Politics	Safe R	November 7, 2006
CQ Politics	Safe R	November 7, 2006

2006 Illinois's 18th congressional district election
Party	Candidate	Votes	%
Republican	Ray LaHood (incumbent)	150,194	67.28
Democratic	Steve Waterworth	73,052	32.72
Total votes		223,246	100.00
Republican hold			

== District 19 ==
2006 Illinois's 19th congressional district election
- November 7, 2006
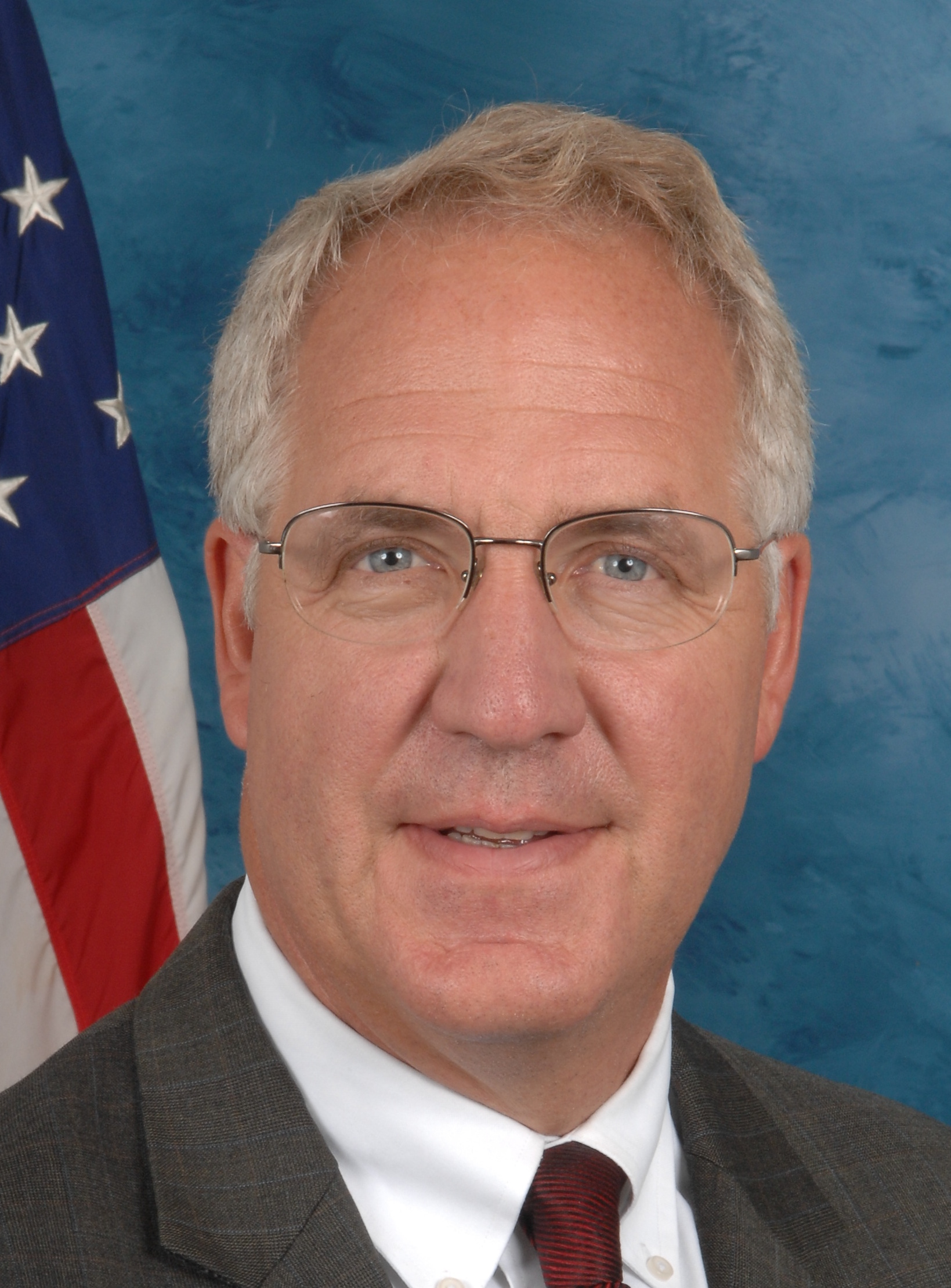

Nominee	John Shimkus	Danny Stover
Party	Republican	Democratic
Popular vote	143,491	92,861
Percentage	60.71%	39.29%
- County results Shimkus: 50–60% 60–70% 70–80% Stover: 50–60%
U.S. Representative before election
John Shimkus
Republican
Elected U.S. Representative
John Shimkus
Republican

This district, the most conservative in Illinois, was composed mainly of southern Illinois, but also included Springfield and a small sliver in western Illinois. Incumbent Republican Congressman John Shimkus, seeking a sixth term, faced off against Democratic opponent Danny Stover. Shimkus played a prominent role in the Mark Foley scandal; he knew of embattled Congressman Foley's controversial activities as the Chairman of the House Page Board and did not take action against Foley. Despite this, Shimkus ultimately swamped Stover on election day, winning over sixty percent of the vote and another term in Congress.

In the Democratic primary, Danny Stover won over coal miner Vic Roberts:

- Stover 20,555 61.56%
- Roberts 12,835 38.44%

In the Republican primary, incumbent John Shimkus only faced token opposition from a write-in candidate.

Danny Stover had the endorsement of the St. Louis Dispatch and John Shimkus had the endorsement of the Chicago Tribune. A poll taken in June had it 53% to 36% in Shimkus favor. Then Mark Foley said he would resign because of a sex scandal. Shimkus being head of the page that Foley went on was in big trouble of losing his seat. A poll taken after the scandal had it 46% to 43% in Shimkus favor. But on Election Day he won by a landslide 39% to 60%. Winning all but one of the 24 counties he represented.

2006 Illinois's 19th congressional district election
Party	Candidate	Votes	%
Republican	John Shimkus (incumbent)	143,491	60.71
Democratic	Danny L. Stover	92,861	39.29
Total votes		236,352	100.00
Majority		50,630	21.42%
Republican hold			
