= Paul Schimpf =

American politician (born 1971)

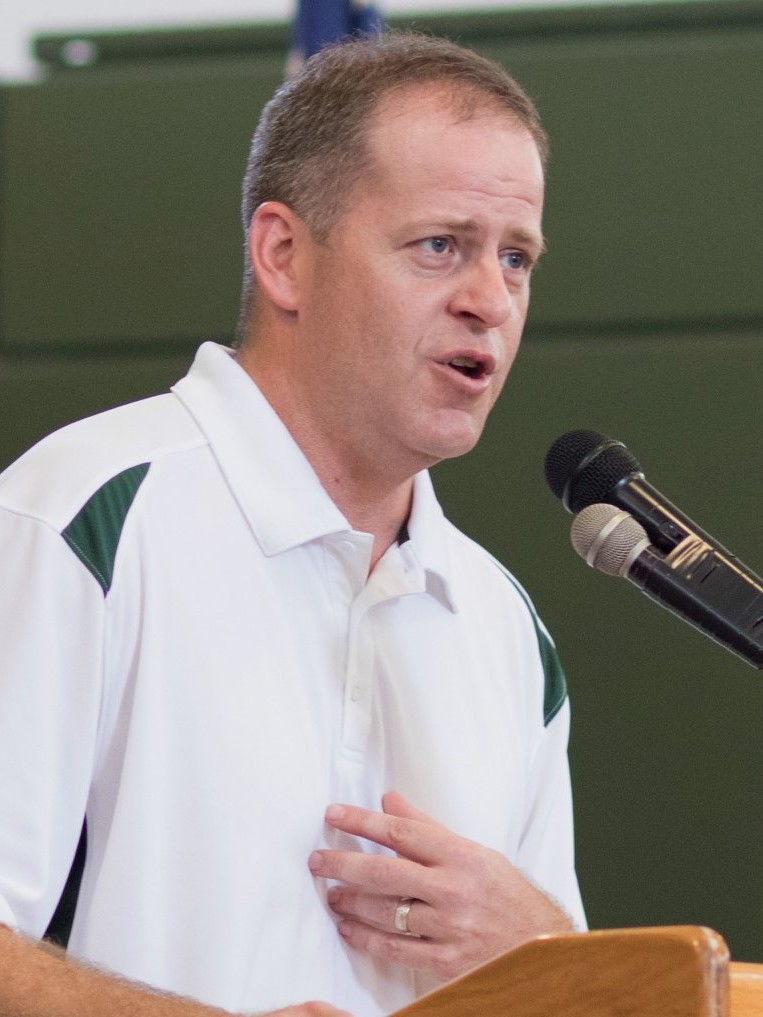
- Schimpf in 2018

Member of the Illinois Senate from the 58th district
- In office January 11, 2017 – January 13, 2021
- Preceded by: David Luechtefeld
- Succeeded by: Terri Bryant

Personal details
- Born: 1971 (age 54–55) Scott Air Force Base, Illinois; United States
- Party: Republican
- Spouse: Lori
- Children: 2
- Education: U.S. Naval Academy (BS); Southern Illinois University (JD)
- Website: Campaign website

Military service
- Allegiance: United States
- Branch/service: (United States Marine Corps) Marine Corps
- Years of service: 1993–2013
- Rank: Lieutenant Colonel
- Unit: Judge Advocate Division

Paul M. Schimpf (born 1971) is an American lawyer and former Republican member of the Illinois Senate from the 58th district from 2017 to 2021.

Among his activities prior to his tenure as State Senator, Schimpf served in the U.S. Marine Corps, participated in the trial of Saddam Hussein, and was the Republican nominee for Illinois Attorney General in 2014.

Schimpf was a candidate for the Republican nomination for governor in the 2022 Illinois gubernatorial election.

== Early life and education ==
Schimpf, the son of two school teachers, was born in 1971 at Scott Air Force Base and raised in Waterloo, Illinois. He was the valedictorian of his high school senior class and was a National Merit Scholar. Schimpf attended the United States Naval Academy – passing an engineering scholarship offer at the University of Illinois – and Southern Illinois University School of Law.

== Career ==
Schimpf served as an officer in the U.S. Marine Corps, rising to the rank of lieutenant colonel. He was commissioned as a second lieutenant in 1993 and retired in May 2013.

In 2005, Schimpf was deployed to Iraq to serve as the chief American advisor to prosecutors in the trial of Saddam Hussein.

Schimpf served as a member of the legislative staff of U.S. Representative John Kline of Minnesota.

=== 2014 Illinois Attorney General campaign ===
Schimpf was the Republican nominee for Illinois Attorney General in 2014. Incumbent Democrat Lisa Madigan defeated him in the general election.

=== Illinois Senate ===
Schimpf ran successfully for the 58th district seat in the Illinois Senate in 2016, defeating former Lieutenant Governor Sheila Simon in the general election. He was sworn in on January 11, 2017. His district included portions of Jefferson, Perry, Randolph, St. Clair, Monroe, Jackson, Union, and Washington counties. Schimpf announced he would not run for reelection to the Illinois Senate in 2020. He was succeeded by Terri Bryant, a member of the Illinois House of Representatives and a fellow Republican.

=== 2022 Illinois gubernatorial campaign ===
On February 15, 2021, Schimpf announced his candidacy for Illinois Governor in the 2022 election. His running mate was Carolyn Schofield. They came in fourth place in the primary, receiving 4.3% of the vote. Schimpf managed to only win his home county Monroe, which was one of only two counties Darren Bailey did not win.

== Electoral history ==
Illinois Attorney General General Election, 2014
| Party | Candidate | Votes | % |
|---|---|---|---|
| Democratic | Lisa Madigan (incumbent) | 2,142,558 | 59.46 |
| Republican | Paul M. Schimpf | 1,360,763 | 37.77 |
| Libertarian | Ben Koyl | 99,903 | 2.77 |
| Total votes | | 3,603,224 | 100.0 |

Illinois 58th State Senate District Republican Primary, 2016
| Party | Candidate | Votes | % |
|---|---|---|---|
| Republican | Paul Schimpf | 19,649 | 67.08 |
| Republican | Sharee Langenstein | 9,641 | 32.92 |
| Total votes | | 29,290 | 100.0 |

Illinois 58th State Senate District General Election, 2016
| Party | Candidate | Votes | % |
|---|---|---|---|
| Republican | Paul Schimpf | 59,735 | 60.56 |
| Democratic | Sheila Simon | 38,905 | 39.44 |
| Total votes | | 98,640 | 100.0 |

2022 Illinois gubernatorial election Republican primary results
| Party | Candidate | Votes | % |
|---|---|---|---|
| Republican | Darren Bailey; Stephanie Trussell | 454,068 | 57.7 |
| Republican | Jesse Sullivan; Kathleen Murphy | 123,156 | 15.6 |
| Republican | Richard Irvin; Avery Bourne | 117,276 | 14.9 |
| Republican | Gary Rabine; Aaron Del Mar | 51,611 | 6.6 |
| Republican | Paul Schimpf; Carolyn Schofield | 33,897 | 4.3 |
| Republican | Max Solomon; Latasha H. Fields | 7,199 | 0.9 |
| Total votes | | 787,207 | |

== Personal life ==
Schimpf married his wife, Lori, while attending Southern Illinois University School of Law. They live in Waterloo, Illinois and have two sons together.

Party political offices
| Preceded by Steve Kim | Republican nominee for Attorney General of Illinois; 2014 | Succeeded by Erika Harold |
