= Avery Bourne =

American politician (born 1992)

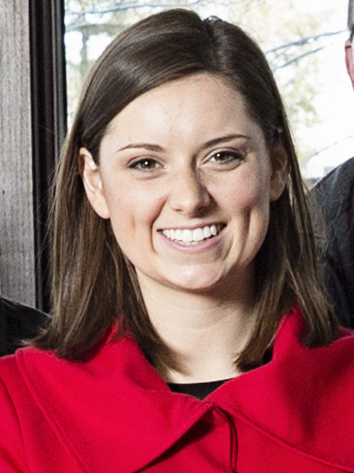
- Bourne in 2015

Member of the Illinois House of Representatives from the 95th district
- In office February 20, 2015 – January 11, 2023
- Preceded by: Wayne Rosenthal
- Succeeded by: Michael Coffey

Personal details
- Born: March 30, 1992 (age 34) Peoria, Illinois, U.S.
- Party: Republican
- Education: Columbia College, Missouri (BA); Washington University

Avery Bourne is an American politician who was a Republican member of the Illinois House of Representatives representing the 95th district. She was sworn in to office on February 20, 2015. She was the youngest legislator to be sworn in to the Illinois General Assembly, breaking the record set by John McCandish King in 1950. Bourne was appointed by the Republican chairmen of the four counties that make up the 95th district: Christian, Macoupin, Madison and Montgomery. She was a student at the law school of Washington University in St. Louis, prior to becoming a state representative. Bourne was Richard Irvin's running mate for the Republican primary in the 2022 Illinois gubernatorial election.

As of July 3, 2022, Representative Bourne was a member of the following Illinois House committees:

- Appropriations – Elementary & Secondary Education Committee (HAPE)
- Child Care Access & Early Childhood Education Committee (HCEC)
- Elementary & Secondary Education: Administration, Licenses & Charter Committee (HELO)
- Elementary & Secondary Education: School Curriculum & Policies Committee (HELM)
- Executive Committee (HEXC)
- Redistricting Committee (HRED)

== Electoral history ==
=== Illinois State Assembly ===
Illinois 95th Assembly district election, 2016 Republican primary election
Party	Candidate	Votes	%
Republican	Avery Bourne (incumbent)	9,636	60.1
Republican	Dennis J. Scobbie	4,681	29.2
Republican	Christopher M. Hicks	1,711	10.7
Total votes		16,028	100

Illinois 95th Assembly district election, 2016 general election
Party	Candidate	Votes	%
Republican	Avery Bourne (incumbent)	27,601	56.9
Democratic	Mike Mathis	20,898	43.1
Independent	Jake Leonard	13	nil
Total votes		48,512	100
Republican hold			

Illinois 95th Assembly district election, 2018 general election
Party	Candidate	Votes	%
Republican	Avery Bourne (incumbent)	24,551	59.8
Democratic	Dillon Clark	16,488	40.2
Independent	Craig Barnstable	5	nil
Total votes		41,044	100
Republican hold			

Illinois 95th Assembly district election, 2020 Republican primary election
Party	Candidate	Votes	%
Republican	Avery Bourne (incumbent)	6,965	85.5
Republican	Lawrence L. Oliver	1,181	14.5
Total votes		8,146	100

Illinois 95th Assembly district election, 2020 general election
Party	Candidate	Votes	%
Republican	Avery Bourne (incumbent)	36,245	70.1
Democratic	Chase Wilhelm	15,475	29.9
Total votes		51,720	100
Republican hold			

=== Lieutenant Governor of Illinois ===
2022 Illinois gubernatorial election Republican primary results
Party	Candidate	Votes	%
Republican	Darren Bailey; Stephanie Trussell	454,068	57.7
Republican	Jesse Sullivan; Kathleen Murphy	123,156	15.6
Republican	Richard Irvin; Avery Bourne	117,276	14.9
Republican	Gary Rabine; Aaron Del Mar	51,611	6.6
Republican	Paul Schimpf; Carolyn Schofield	33,897	4.3
Republican	Max Solomon; Latasha H. Fields	7,199	0.9
Total votes		787,207	
