= Terri Bryant =

American politician (born 1963)

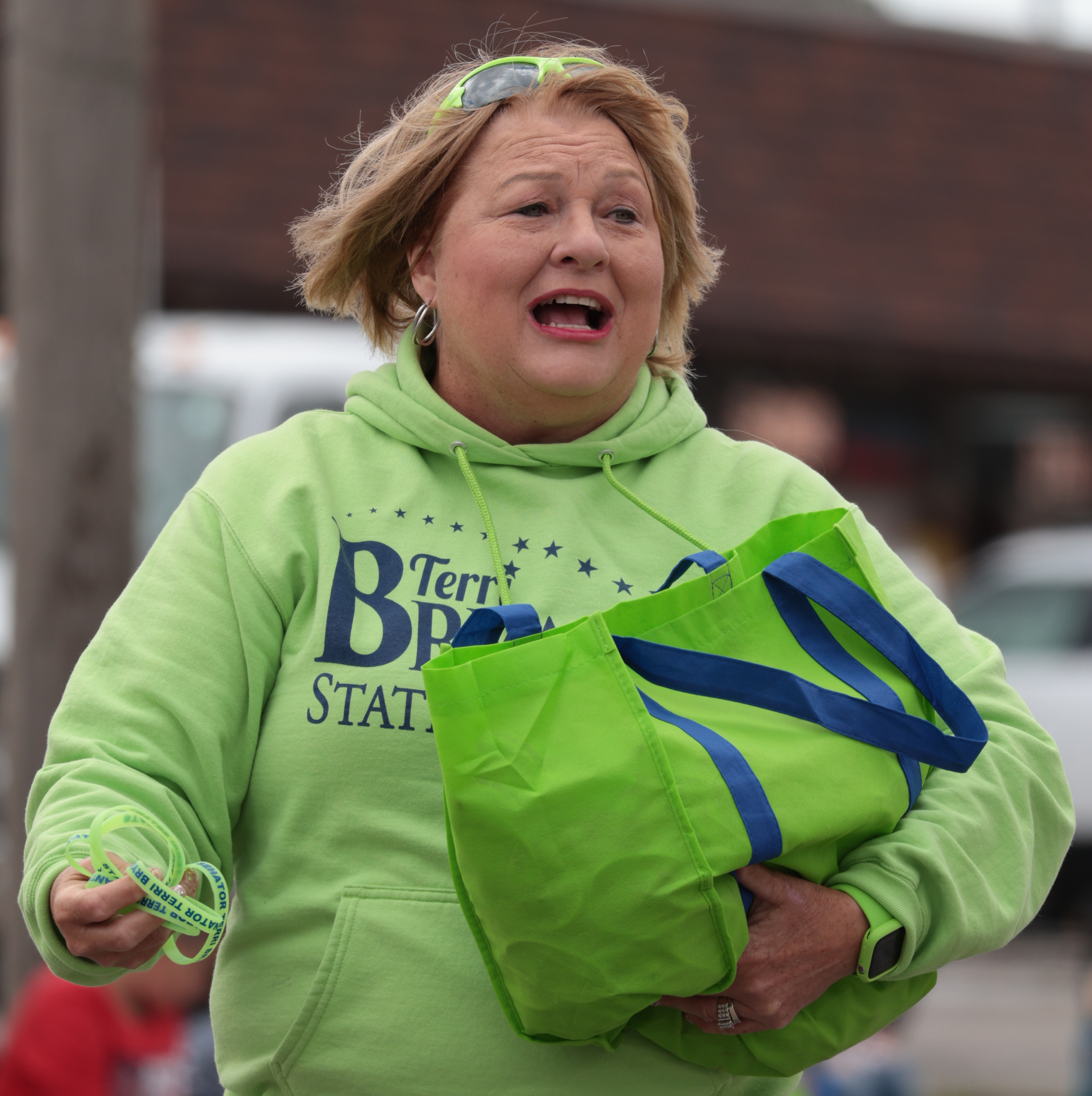
- Bryant in 2026

Member of the Illinois Senate from the 58th district
- Incumbent
- Assumed office January 13, 2021
- Preceded by: Paul Schimpf

Member of the Illinois House of Representatives from the 115th district
- In office January 2, 2015 – January 13, 2021
- Preceded by: Mike Bost
- Succeeded by: Paul Jacobs

Personal details
- Born: September 20, 1963 (age 62)
- Party: Republican
- Spouse: Rick Bryant
- Children: 2
- Website: https://senatorbryant.com

Terri Bryant (born September 20, 1963) is a Republican member of the Illinois Senate from the 58th district. Previously, she was a member of the Illinois House of Representatives representing the 115th district from 2015 until 2021.

== Early and personal life ==
Bryant was a public administrator with the Illinois Department of Corrections prior to her tenure as a State Representative. Bryant has served as a precinct committeeperson, vice-president of the Jackson County Republican Women's Club and as second vice-chair of the Jackson County Republican Central Committee. She was also a delegate to the Illinois Republican Conventions in 2008 and again in 2012. Outside of politics, Bryant has experience in the farming and service industries, including owning a successful Bluebell Restaurant in Murphysboro, Illinois.

== Illinois House ==
She took office two weeks earlier than the majority of the 2015 freshman class when her predecessor Mike Bost resigned early in order to take office in Congress. The 115th district, located in Southern Illinois, includes Jefferson, Washington, Perry, Jackson and Union counties.

== Illinois Senate ==
Bryant announced she would run for the Illinois Senate in 2020 to succeed fellow Republican Paul Schimpf. She was elected to the Illinois Senate and succeeded in the House by fellow Republican Paul Jacobs.

She serves on the following committees: Behavioral and Mental Health (Minority Spokesperson); Agriculture; Education; Ethics; Executive Appointments; Health; Tourism and Hospitality; Subcommittee on Children & Family; Sub. on Long-Term Care & Aging; Redistricting- Southern Illinois.

== Electoral history ==
=== 2014 ===
After Republican incumbent Mike Bost announced his run for Illinois's 12th congressional district, Bryant defeated Democratic nominee Bill Kilquist, an incumbent member of the Logan College Board of Trustees and former Jackson County Sheriff, and Green Party nominee Gary Shepherd.

2014 Illinois 115th State House District General Election
Party	Candidate	Votes	%
Republican	Terri Bryant	21,319	60.8
Democratic	William "Bill" Kilquist	13,649	38.9
Green	Gary Shepherd	106	0.3
Republican hold			

=== 2016 ===
2016 Illinois 115th State House District General Election
Party	Candidate	Votes	%
Republican	Terri Bryant	26,454	55.02
Democratic	Marsha Griffin	21,626	44.98
Total votes		48,080	100.0

=== 2018 ===
2018 Illinois 115th State House District General Election
Party	Candidate	Votes	%
Republican	Terri Bryant	24,512	59.0
Democratic	Marsha Griffin	17,050	41.0
Total votes		41,562	100.0

=== 2020 ===
2020 Illinois State Senate District 58 General Election
Party	Candidate	Votes	%
Republican	Terri Bryant	85,257	100.0
Total votes		85,257	100.0

=== 2022 ===
2022 Illinois State Senate District 58 General Election
Party	Candidate	Votes	%
Republican	Terri Bryant	73,954	100.0
Total votes		73,954	100.0

=== 2024 ===
Bryant is running for reelection. Wesley Kash, a former Assistant State’s Attorney in Jefferson County, is challenging Bryant in the primary.

2024 Illinois State Senate District 58 Primary Election
Party	Candidate	Votes	%
Republican	Terri Bryant		
Republican	Wesley Kash		
Total votes			
