= John Laesch =

American politician

Mayor of Aurora
- Incumbent
- Assumed office May 13, 2025
- Preceded by: Richard Irvin

Alderman of Aurora at-large
- In office May 2023 – May 2025
- Preceded by: Sherman Jenkins

Personal details
- Born: 1974 (age 51–52) Monrovia, Liberia
- Party: Democratic
- Spouse: Jennifer Laesch
- Education: Illinois State University
- Profession: Union Carpenter

John Laesch (born 1974) is an American Democratic politician from the U.S. state of Illinois. He is the mayor of Aurora, Illinois, elected in 2025 after defeating Republican incumbent Richard Irvin. A U.S. Navy veteran, Laesch served as an alderman in Aurora from 2023 to 2025, and was a candidate for Congress in 2006 and 2008.

== Early life and career ==
Laesch was born in Monrovia, Liberia to missionary parents. A veteran of the United States Navy, he enlisted in 1995 and served as an intelligence analyst in the Middle East. Following his honorable discharge from the military in 1999, Laesch earned a degree in history from Illinois State University.

As of 2006, Laesch worked as a union carpenter.

== Politics ==
Laesch is a political progressive. He has held various leadership roles in Democratic campaigns in his state. In 2004, Laesch served as the campaign manager for David Gill in Illinois' 15th congressional district.

In 2006, Laesch ran for Illinois's 14th congressional district against Republican Dennis Hastert. During this campaign, Hastert was linked to the 2006 Mark Foley scandal, which Laesch expected to help his campaign. Laesch was considered a member of the Fighting Dems, former members of the U.S. Armed Forces who ran for election to the Congress in 2006. On November 7, Laesch lost in his bid to unseat Hastert, with Hastert winning 59.79% to Laesch's 40.21%.

Laesch ran in the 2008 Illinois's 14th congressional district special election, following Hastert's resignation in 2007. However, he lost the Democratic primary to Bill Foster (who later went on to flip the seat). Laesch ran again in the November 2008 election for the seat, and again lost to Foster in the primary.

Laesch successfully ran for the East Aurora School District 131 board in 2015, winning a four-year term. Laesch did not run for reelection in 2019, leaving office on April 30 of that year.

Laesch ran for mayor of Aurora in 2021, but lost to Richard Irvin. He successfully ran for an at-large seat on Aurora's city council in 2023, defeating incumbent Sherman Jenkins.

In 2025, Laesch again ran for mayor against Irvin. He won the election by about 7 percentage points.

In September 2025, President Donald Trump ordered flags at federal and state facilities throughout the United States to be flown at half-staff through September 14 in memory of right-wing activist Charlie Kirk, who had been assassinated on September 10. However, Laesch ordered flags at municipal sites in Aurora to be lowered in honor of the anniversary of September 11, but had them returned to full-staff the following day. In a statement, Laesch defended his decision, saying "lowering the flag is a solemn act that carries great weight. The choice to do so should not be made cavalierly. Doing so diminishes the importance of the remembrance of tragedies like Sept. 11, 2001." He also reaffirmed the city's stance against "all forms of violence", and its commitment to "promoting peace, safety, and dignity for every resident".

== Electoral history ==
2025 Aurora mayoral general election (runoff)
Party	Candidate	Votes	%
Nonpartisan	John Laesch	9,944	53.1
Nonpartisan	Richard C. Irvin (Incumbent)	8,781	46.9
Total votes		18,725	100.0

2025 Aurora mayoral primary election
Party	Candidate	Votes	%
Nonpartisan	Richard C. Irvin (Incumbent)	4,060	40.2
Nonpartisan	John Laesch	3,386	33.5
Nonpartisan	Theodoros "Ted" Mesiacos	1,206	11.9
Nonpartisan	Judd Lofchie	1,020	10.1
Nonpartisan	Karina Garcia	378	3.7
Nonpartisan	Jazmine Garcia	60	0.6
Total votes		10,110	100.0

2023 Aurora alderman-at-large election
Party	Candidate	Votes	%
Nonpartisan	John Laesch	4,725	53.79
Nonpartisan	Sherman Jenkins	3,341	38.03
Nonpartisan	Mansa Lathan Williams	719	8.18
Total votes		8,785	100.00

2021 Aurora mayoral election
Party	Candidate	Votes	%
Nonpartisan	Richard C. Irvin (Incumbent)	6,697	55.59
Nonpartisan	Judd Lofchie	2,806	23.29
Nonpartisan	John Laesch	2,544	21.12
Total votes		12,047	100.00

2015 East Aurora School District 131, At-Large General Election, 4-year term
Party	Candidate	Votes	%
Nonpartisan	Alex Arroyo	1,336	18.6
Nonpartisan	Kenneth Darby	937	13.1
Nonpartisan	Kimberly Hatchett	893	12.4
Nonpartisan	John Laesch	837	11.7
Nonpartisan	Mary Garza	764	10.6
Nonpartisan	Raymond Hull (Incumbent)	751	10.5
Nonpartisan	Anita Lewis	643	9.0
Nonpartisan	Mary Louise Peryea (Incumbent)	537	7.5
Nonpartisan	Julie Garofalo	479	6.7
Total votes		7,177	100.0

2008 Illinois's 14th congressional district special election, Democratic primary
Party	Candidate	Votes	%
Democratic	Bill Foster	32,982	49.60
Democratic	John Laesch	28,433	42.76
Democratic	Jotham Stein	5,082	7.64
Total votes		66,497	100.00

2006 Illinois's 14th congressional district election
Party	Candidate	Votes	%
Republican	Dennis Hastert (Incumbent)	117,870	59.79
Democratic	John Laesch	79,274	40.21
Total votes		197,144	100.00
