= Tom Weisner =

American politician (1949–2018)

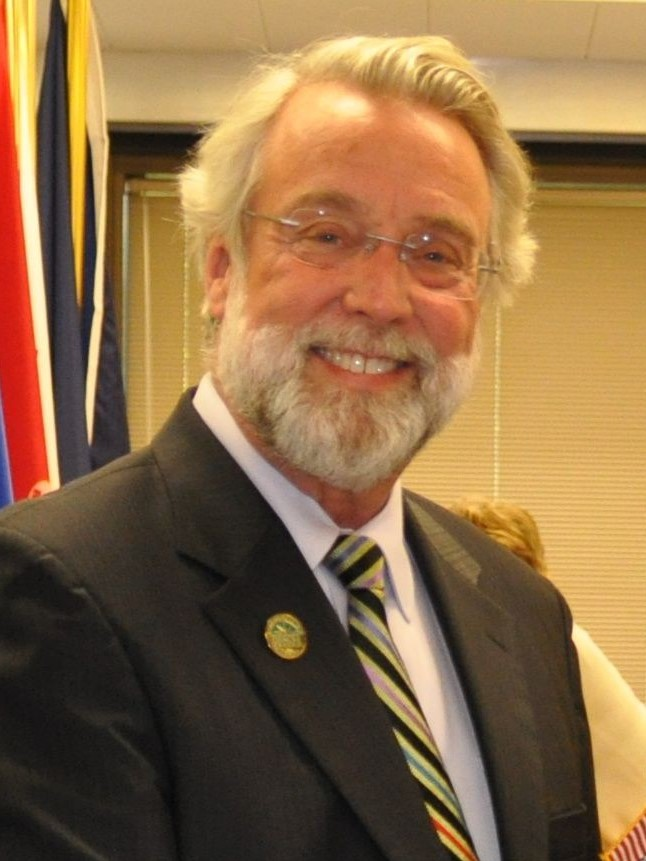

Mayor of Aurora, Illinois
- In office April 26, 2005 – November 1, 2016
- Preceded by: David Stover
- Succeeded by: Bob O'Connor

Personal details
- Born: October 6, 1949 Batavia, Illinois, U.S.
- Died: December 28, 2018 (aged 69) Aurora, Illinois, U.S.
- Party: Democratic
- Spouse: Marilyn (m. 1972)
- Education: Aurora University

Tom Weisner (October 6, 1949 – December 28, 2018) was an American politician. He became the mayor of Aurora, Illinois, beginning in April 2005. Prior to his election he worked for over eighteen years in high-ranking positions in the city of Aurora and for five years as a volunteer in the Peace Corps.

Weisner was re-elected twice, in 2009 and 2013, serving as mayor until his resignation on October 30, 2016, due to his declining health. He had been diagnosed with cancer two years into his first of three terms as mayor. He died of cancer-related complications on December 28, 2018.

== Background ==
Weisner was a native of Batavia, Illinois, but moved to Aurora thirty years before becoming a political candidate. Weisner had been married to Marilyn Hogan Weisner since 1972. The Weisners raised two sons; Thaddeus, who died in 2006, and Anthony. Weisner earned his bachelor's degree from Aurora University in organizational management.

Prior to becoming an Aurora city employee in 1986, Weisner worked in the private sector and spent five years in the Solomon Islands, where he gave medical services and other assistance to natives with the Peace Corps and International Human Assistance Program. He and his wife were stationed in rain forests on the Island of Guadalcanal.

Weisner had held several department head positions in Aurora since beginning his first position as emergency service coordinator in January 1986. By fall 1987, Weisner had become the superintendent of the Aurora Department of Motor Vehicles. He later served as the director of equipment services for Aurora and was subsequently appointed Aurora's director of public property in a 1991 city hall reorganization. In 1999, he was appointed Aurora's director of community services and organizational development, which was his last position before running for public office. He resigned from this position in February 2004 during the city's water contamination crisis. The city's residents were under a boil water order at the time of his resignation. The order to boil drinking water contaminated with E. coli bacteria lasted for ten days.

Weisner served as a delegate to the 2012 Democratic National Convention.

== Campaign ==
In November 2002, two-term incumbent David Stover announced he would not seek re-election. In May 2003, Weisner announced he would run for election in the February 22, 2005 municipal primary election. Weisner announced his candidacy for mayor almost two years before the election, in order to solidify his base of support, which might have gone to other potential candidates if he waited. Eventually, a final field of five contested for the two spots on the ballot for the April 5, 2005 general election, but Weisner had endorsements from eight of the twelve city council members and a huge funding advantage.

In the first Aurora mayoral race without an incumbent in twenty years, Democrat Weisner garnered 60% of the vote and Republican Richard Irvin finished second with 33% to advance to the general election. Irvin was the only African-American in the race. Weisner won eight of the city's 10 wards and nearly two-thirds of its precincts. When Barack Obama visited Aurora on February 25 for his 10th town hall meeting after his 2004 United States Senate election in Illinois, he noted that as a Democrat he was inclined to support Weisner, but he made no endorsement. However, in the final days before the general election, Obama returned to endorse Weisner. The day after the election, the Chicago Tribune reported Weisner took 59% of the vote, and the Chicago Sun-Times reported that he took 68%. When the results were finally tabulated in Aurora, which spans four counties, the Tribune turned out to be correct. Weisner took the oath of office on April 26, 2005.

== Mayor ==
During the first few weeks of his tenure as mayor, he made national news by considering passing an ordinance against untimely holiday decorations, when citizens complained of Christmas decorations abounding during the summer. At about the same time in June 2005, he was considering proposing a strict whistleblower protection ordinance in response to an alderman bribery scandal.

In July 2007, first-term Kentucky Governor Ernie Fletcher visited Weisner and took footage of the Hollywood Casino of Aurora. In August, when Fletcher's re-election ad campaign began airing on television in Kentucky, journalists began calling Weisner's office about the ads which used the footage as a backdrop for a message regarding the evils and temptations casinos bring into communities. The footage was included in the very first ads that Fletcher aired and the Kentucky press noted that Aurora City Hall was not pleased with the usage. One Kentucky journalist referred to the Aurora casino as the "unnamed villain" in Fletcher's anti-gambling ads.

One of Weisner's major initiatives was to make Aurora the first city in Illinois to construct a complete wireless Internet infrastructure. In January 2008 while it was in the middle of installing the city's Wi-Fi network, MetroFi switched from an advertising-based model to a subscription-based business model and suspended construction. MetroFi had also contracted to install a network for Naperville, Illinois and attempted to sell partially installed networks to both cities. In June 2008, Metrofi shut down all its wifi operations across the nation.

In early March 2008, two Aurora City Council Aldermen announced their candidacies for mayor. In May 2008, Weisner announced his intentions to run for re-election in the non-partisan February 24, 2009 primary election after the two challengers announced. In the shadow of the Rod Blagojevich corruption scandal, his campaign has since been criticized by his opponents for accepting contributions from businesses that the city awarded contracts to. Weisner was re-elected on April 7, 2009.

He ran unopposed for re-election on April 9, 2013.

On May 8, 2015, Weisner announced that he would not seek a fourth term.

== Resignation and death ==
Weisner was diagnosed with colon cancer in 2007. On August 25, 2016, Weisner announced his intention to step down as mayor, effective October 30, 2016. He cited health (cancer treatment) as the main reason for stepping down. He was succeeded by Alderman Bob O'Connor.

Weisner died of cancer-related complications on December 28, 2018. He was 69.

== See also ==
- List of mayors of Aurora, Illinois
