= List of mayors of Aurora, Illinois =

The following is a list of mayors of the city of Aurora, Illinois, United States.

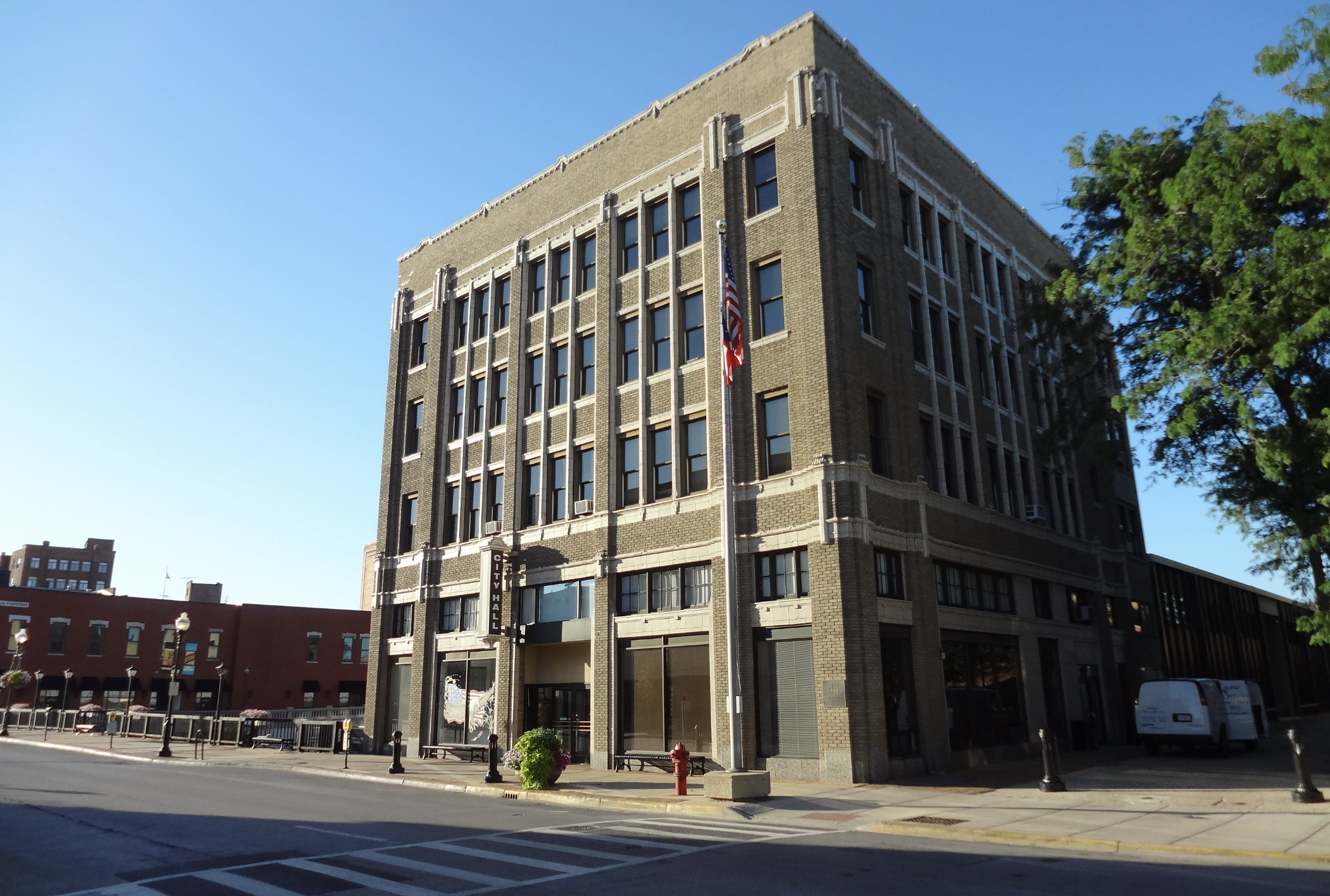
City hall building in Aurora, Illinois (photo 2011)

- B.F. Hall, 1857
- William R. Allen, 1858
- W. V. Plum, 1859
- O. D. Day, 1860
- M.M. Ravlin, 1861
- W. H. Hawkins, 1862, 1872
- Edward Gillette, 1863
- Charles Wheaton, 1864
- Delos W. Young, 1865-1866
- R. L. Carter, 1867
- A. T. Hall, 1868
- B. F. Parks, 1869
- James Walker, 1870
- D. B. Waterman, 1871
- Alonzo George, 1873
- Alexander C. Little, 1874
- Daniel Volintine, 1875
- Thomas E. Hall, 1876
- E. L. Bartlett, 1877
- C. C. Earle, 1878
- W. W. Bishop, 1879
- L. D. Brady, 1880
- Travis Phillips, 1881
- James W. Battle, 1882
- William McMicken, 1883
- J. F. Thorwarth, 1884
- Fred Otis White, 1885
- Holmes Miller, 1886
- George Meredith, 1887-1888
- John Jameson, 1889-1890
- W. S. Frazeir, 1891-1892
- John C. Murphy, 1893-1894
- L. K. Scott, 1895-1896
- T. N. Holden, 1897-1898
- Theodore Howard, 1899-1900
- George W. Alshuler, 1901-1902
- John M. Raymond, 1903-1904
- Henry B. Douglas, 1905-1906
- E. C. Finch, 1907-1908
- Fred Fauth, 1909-1910
- Thomas Sanders, 1911-1914
- James E. Harley, 1915-1918
- Charles A. Townsend, 1919-1920
- Charles H. Greene, 1921-1930
- Conrad M. Bjorseth, 1931-1936
- Harry B. Warner, 1937-1940
- Andrew J. Carter, 1941-1947
- Henry Rauscher, 1948
- Lloyd Merkel, 1949-1952
- Paul Egan, 1953-1961
- Jay L. Hunter, 1961-1965
- Albert D. McCoy, 1965-1977
- Jack Hill, 1977-1985
- David L. Pierce, 1985-1997
- David L. Stover, 1997-2005
- Thomas J. Weisner, 2005-2016
- Robert J. O’Connor, 2016-2017
- Richard C. Irvin, 2017–2025
- John Laesch, 2025–present

== See also ==
- Aurora history
