= Richard Irvin (Illinois politician) =

American politician

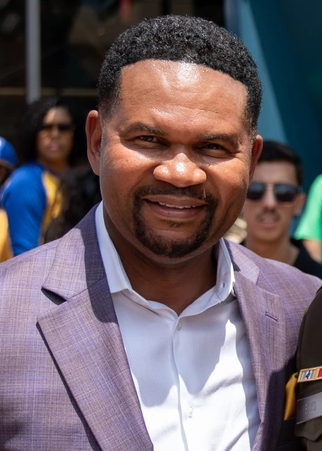

Mayor of Aurora
- In office May 9, 2017 – May 13, 2025
- Preceded by: Bob O'Connor
- Succeeded by: John Laesch

Personal details
- Born: March 29, 1970 (age 56) Aurora, Illinois, U.S.
- Party: Republican
- Education: Robert Morris College (BA); Northern Illinois University (JD)

Richard C. Irvin is an American lawyer and politician who previously served as the mayor of Aurora, Illinois. A member of the Republican Party, he began his tenure as mayor in 2017, and lost his re-election bid in 2025 to Democratic alderman John Laesch. In 2022, he sought the Republican nomination for Illinois Governor. A Gulf War veteran, Irvin has worked as an educator and prosecutor.

== Early life and education ==
Irvin was born and raised in Aurora, Illinois, the son of a single mother. He is a graduate of East Aurora High School. After high school, he enlisted in the U.S. Army and served in the Gulf War. Irvin graduated with a B.A. from Robert Morris College and in 1998, he received a J.D. from the Northern Illinois University College of Law. He served as a substitute teacher in the East Aurora School District and as an adjunct professor at Robert Morris College and Northern Illinois University.

== Law career ==
After graduating from law school, Irvin served as an assistant state's attorney for the Cook County State's Attorney's office and the Kane County State's Attorney's office.

In 2001, he was named Aurora's first community prosecutor, an alternative law enforcement strategy designed to improve police relationships with residents and develop solutions to drugs, prostitution, and other quality of life crimes. As community prosecutor, he joined the U.S. Department of Justice's “Weed and Seed” program, which aimed to both aggressively combat crime in specified areas, but also provide redevelopment and social services. Irvin also successfully pressured the owners of Woodlands Apartments, an apartment complex notorious for violent crimes, drug sales, and prostitution, to improve security of the complex or be shut down. A year after Irvin's intervention, residents said the complex was "pretty much cleaned up."

Irvin was removed as community prosecutor in late 2002, and he resigned from the Kane County State's Attorney's office in 2003 to open his own law office.

== 2003–2016 political activity ==
In 2003, Irvin announced he would run for Mayor of Aurora after incumbent mayor David Stover announced that he would not seek a third term. While the race was officially non-partisan, Irvin was supported by prominent Republican politicians and conservative organizations, and his opponent Tom Weisner had the support of Democratic politicians, including then-Senator Barack Obama. Weisner also had the support of eight of Aurora's twelve aldermen and raised nearly three times the amount of money as Irvin. In April 2005, Weisner defeated Irvin with 60.8% percent of the vote.

In 2007, Irvin won election as Alderman At-Large on the Aurora City Council, the first African American elected to the position.

In 2008, he announced he would run for mayor again and challenge Weisner. Irvin criticized Weisner for enacting tax increases during his first term, including a 7.5 percent property tax increase, and pledged to roll back property taxes if elected mayor. In April 2009, Weisner defeated Irvin and fellow alderman Stephanie Kifowit, and won re-election.

== Mayor of Aurora ==
In 2016, Weisner stepped down, citing his health. Irvin, state representative Linda Chapa LaVila, alderman Michael Saville, and Weisner's assistant chief of staff Richard "Rick" Guzman ran to replace him. Following the February 28, 2017 primary, Irvin and Guzman advanced to the April 4 general election. Irvin campaigned on controlling crime and improving education, and narrowly defeated Guzman with 53% of the vote.

He was sworn in on May 9, 2017, becoming Aurora's first African-American mayor.

On April 6, 2021, Irvin won re-election to another four-year term, defeating Alderman Judd Lofchie and union carpenter John Laesch with over 55% of the vote. Irvin made economic development central to his campaign.

On April 1, 2025, Irvin was defeated in an upset and conceded to Alderman-at-Large John Laesch after a close election, in which Irvin achieved 47.7% of the vote, while Laesch won with 52.3%.

=== Violence and crime ===
When five people were killed in a mass shooting in Aurora in 2019, Irvin reacted by saying, "It's a shame that mass shootings such as this have become commonplace in our country [and] that a cold and heartless offender would be so selfish as to think he has the right to take an innocent life. But we as a society cannot allow these horrific acts to become commonplace."

Following the shooting deaths of 15-year-old Jasmine Noble and 20-year-old Juanya Booker in Aurora in 2019, Irvin said his administration would put a renewed focus on youth mentoring programs. This included city promotion of such programs.

In December 2019, Irvin defended the Aurora Police's issues of notices to nineteen convicted child sex offenders at Aurora halfway house Wayside Cross Ministries that they needed to leave the house, saying that the house's proximity to a playground at McCarty Park meant state law prohibited it from housing such offenders. The offenders' lawyer raised concerns that the offenders could be forced into homelessness in the middle of winter. Following a legal dispute, all the offenders found alternative housing.

=== COVID-19 ===
On March 16, 2020, Irvin declared a formal emergency due to the COVID-19 pandemic, which gave him emergency powers. He supported Illinois Governor J. B. Pritzker's March 2020 stay-at-home order and urged residents to take preventative steps such as mask-wearing.

=== Racial justice and policing ===
Irvin condemned looting that took place in downtown Aurora in late May 2020, amid widespread unrest across the world over the murder of George Floyd. "Aurora will be ready for you if you try to cause destruction in our community," he said. "We will not put up with this BS and foolishness." Additionally, he placed two back-to-back curfews in the city during the rioting.

In the wake of Floyd's murder, Irvin backed a number of police reforms in Aurora, including officer body cameras and a civilian review board to investigate complaints about officers.

=== 2022 pride parade ===
After the organizers of Aurora's 2022 pride parade asked that uniformed and armed police officers not march in the parade, Irvin said he would not attend it – as he had in 2018 and 2019 – and pulled the City's float from the parade. The organizers' request was made to make the parade "the most welcoming environment possible," and they said that “trust between police and LGBTQ people and people of color” is extremely low.

Days before the parade was set to occur, the City of Aurora revoked its permit, saying that not enough police officers had signed up for the extra shifts needed for adequate security at the event. The American Civil Liberties Union had previously warned Irvin against revoking the permit. When a judge upheld the permit's revocation, organizers threatened to file a federal lawsuit. However, Aurora officials said that by offering a triple pay incentive, they had secured enough officers to work at the parade.

== Candidate for Illinois Governor ==
On December 16, 2021, it was reported that Illinois billionaire hedge fund manager Kenneth C. Griffin was to fund a Republican gubernatorial campaign of Irvin. Griffin wanted to oust incumbent J.B Pritzker, a Democrat. The news was surprising given Irvin's previous praise of Pritzker and because he had not been widely seen as a potential candidate. Several other candidates were already seeking the Republican nomination. Previously, in October 2021, a spokesperson for Irvin said that there was "no way" he would run for governor.

On January 17, 2022, Irvin officially announced his gubernatorial campaign and said his running mate for Lieutenant Governor was Illinois State Representative Avery Bourne. To launch is campaign, he released a highly-produced video touting his background as a descendant of enslaved people, an Army veteran and the mayor of Illinois' second-largest city.

Pritzker's campaign connected Irvin to former Illinois Governor Bruce Rauner, who was widely seen as unpopular. Fellow Republican candidates questioned Irvin's principals and party loyalty, as he pulled Democratic ballots in 2014, 2016, and 2020.

Irvin struggled to answer for his previous support of Pritzker as well as his position on abortion.

While seen as a conservative at the beginning of his political career, as Aurora mayor he adopted policies much more in line with Democrats, before again reversing himself on a number of issues when he ran for governor.

In May 2022, it was reported that at Aurora cannabis dispensary Zen Leaf on May 24, 2021, Irvin's then-girlfriend Laura Ayala-Clarke was charged after she allegedly assaulted a security guard after they touched her in an effort to remove her from the dispensary. When Irvin arrived on the scene, according to a police report, he was overheard saying in a phone call that the "charges would be taken care of." Irvin later said that he said they would be taken care of in the sense that she would be afforded a lawyer and that he did not abuse his mayoral power.

While Irvin quickly garnered the support of the party's establishment and several donations from wealthy Republicans including Griffin, he ultimately failed to win over the party's right-wing base and lost the primary in a landslide, coming in third place out of six tickets, with only 15% of the vote. State Senator Darren Bailey and running mate Stephanie Trussell won the primary with 57% of the vote.

== Electoral history ==
2005 Aurora mayoral election
Party	Candidate	Votes	%
Nonpartisan	Tom Weisner	7,973	60.80
Nonpartisan	Richard C. Irvin	5,140	39.20
Total votes		13,113	100.0

2007 Aurora alderman at-large election
Party	Candidate	Votes	%
Nonpartisan	Richard C. Irvin	6,167	68.05
Nonpartisan	Bob Shelton	2,853	31.48
Total votes		9,020	99.54

2009 Aurora mayoral election
Party	Candidate	Votes	%
Nonpartisan	Tom Weisner	6,477	55.64
Nonpartisan	Richard C. Irvin	2,872	24.67
Nonpartisan	Stephanie A. Kifowit	2,292	19.69
Total votes		11,641	100.0

2017 Aurora mayoral primary
Party	Candidate	Votes	%
Nonpartisan	Richard C. Irvin	3,506	31.77
Nonpartisan	Richard Guzman	3,135	28.40
Nonpartisan	Linda Chapa LaVia	2,824	25.57
Nonpartisan	Michael Saville	1,566	14.18
Total votes		11,037	99.95

2017 Aurora mayoral general election
Party	Candidate	Votes	%
Nonpartisan	Richard C. Irvin	5,838	53.25
Nonpartisan	Richard Guzman	5,125	46.75
Total votes		10,963	100.0

2021 Aurora mayoral election
Party	Candidate	Votes	%
Nonpartisan	Richard C. Irvin (Incumbent)	6,697	55.59
Nonpartisan	Judd Lofchie	2,806	23.29
Nonpartisan	John Laesch	2,544	21.12
Total votes		12,047	100.0

2022 Illinois gubernatorial election Republican primary results
Party	Candidate	Votes	%
Republican	Darren Bailey; Stephanie Trussell	454,068	57.7
Republican	Jesse Sullivan; Kathleen Murphy	123,156	15.6
Republican	Richard Irvin; Avery Bourne	117,276	14.9
Republican	Gary Rabine; Aaron Del Mar	51,611	6.6
Republican	Paul Schimpf; Carolyn Schofield	33,897	4.3
Republican	Max Solomon; Latasha H. Fields	7,199	0.9
Total votes		787,207	100

2025 Aurora mayoral primary
Party	Candidate	Votes	%
Nonpartisan	Richard C. Irvin (Incumbent)	4,060	40.2
Nonpartisan	John Laesch	3,386	33.5
Nonpartisan	Theodoros "Ted" Mesiacos	1,206	11.9
Nonpartisan	Judd Lofchie	1,020	10.1
Nonpartisan	Karina Garcia	378	3.7
Nonpartisan	Jazmine Garcia	60	0.6
Total votes		10,110	100.0

2025 Aurora mayoral general election
Party	Candidate	Votes	%
Nonpartisan	John Laesch	9,944	53.1
Nonpartisan	Richard Irvin (Incumbent)	8,781	46.9
Total votes		18,725	100.0

== See also ==
- List of mayors of Aurora, Illinois
- List of first African-American mayors
