= 2018 Illinois gubernatorial election =

- November 6, 2018
- Turnout: 56.15% ▲7.67 pp
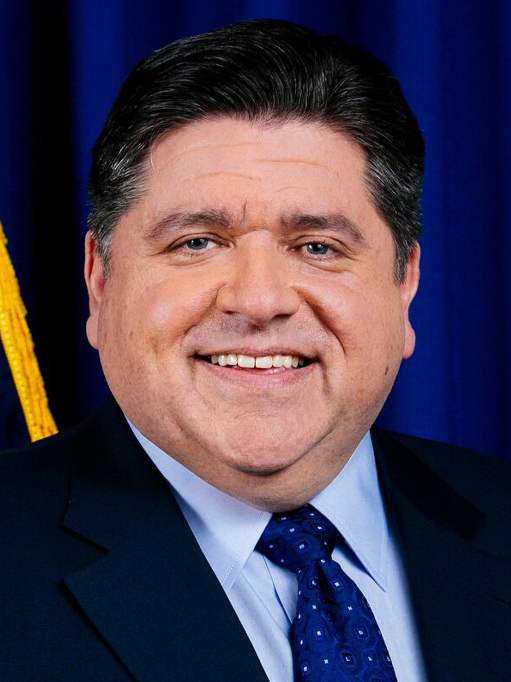

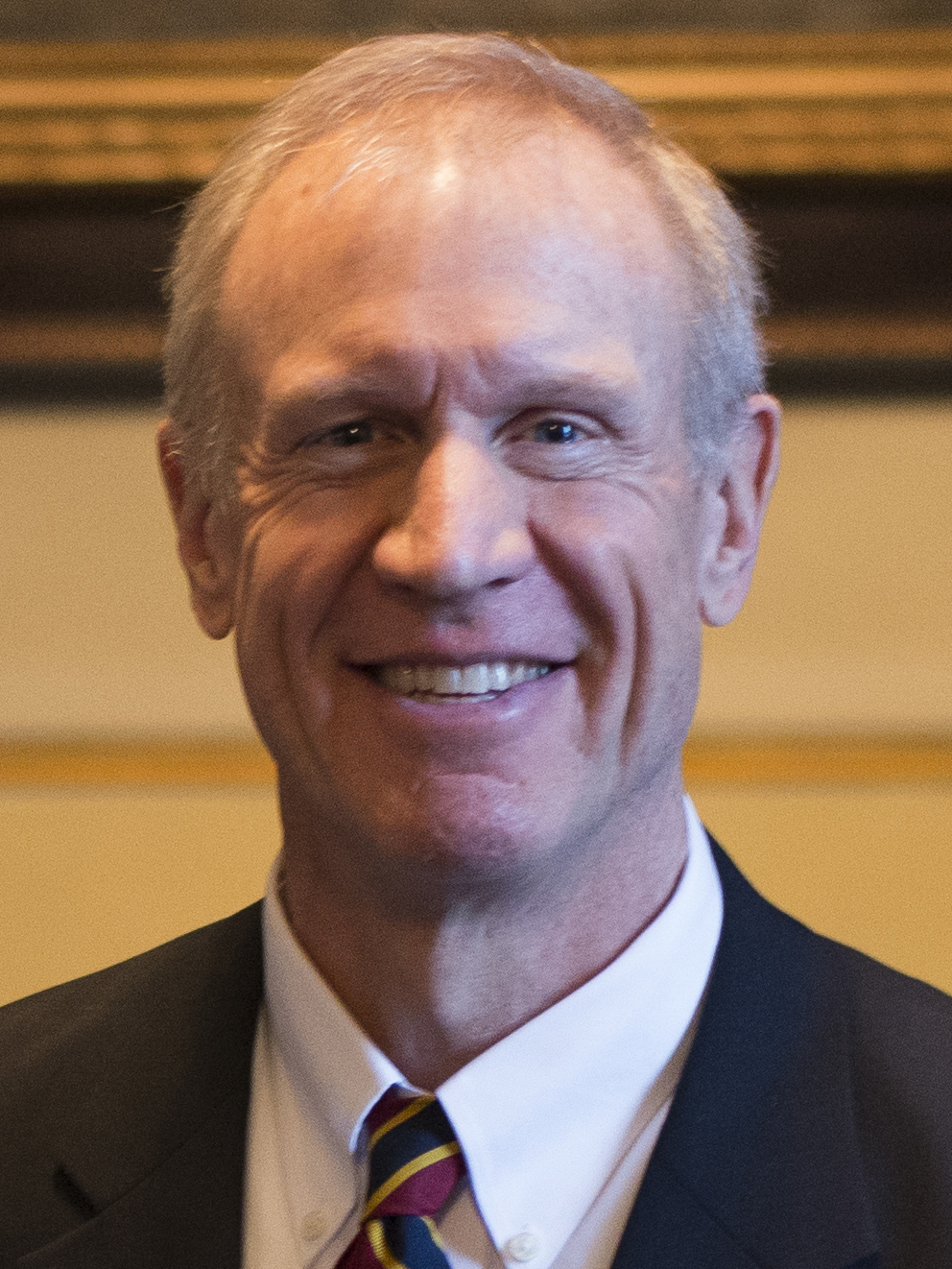
Nominee	JB Pritzker	Bruce Rauner
Party	Democratic	Republican
Running mate	Juliana Stratton	Evelyn Sanguinetti
Popular vote	2,479,746	1,765,751
Percentage	54.53%	38.83%
- Pritzker: 30–40% 40–50% 50–60% 60–70% 70–80% 80–90% >90% Rauner: 30–40% 40–50% 50–60% 60–70% 70–80% 80–90% >90% McCann: 30–40% 40–50% 50–60% Tie: No votes
Governor before election
Bruce Rauner
Republican
Elected Governor
JB Pritzker
Democratic

The 2018 Illinois gubernatorial election took place on November 6, 2018, to elect the governor of Illinois. Republican Governor Bruce Rauner ran for reelection to a second term in office, but was defeated by Democratic nominee JB Pritzker. This is the most recent Illinois gubernatorial contest in which an incumbent was defeated and the last time the governorship of Illinois changed partisan control.

Rauner oversaw a historic budget crisis as governor that severely affected his popularity. His approval rating declined to just 36% in 2017, and he was widely viewed as the most vulnerable incumbent governor in the country. Rauner struggled to galvanize conservatives after making several policy concessions to Democrats and was nearly ousted in the Republican primary by state senator Jeanne Ives. By October 2018, The Cook Political Report assessed that "there is no path to victory for Rauner."

Pritzker ultimately defeated Rauner by nearly 16 points, the largest gubernatorial victory in Illinois since Jim Edgar's 1994 reelection. Rauner's loss was the widest margin of defeat for any incumbent governor since Ernie Fletcher of Kentucky was ousted in 2007. This was one of seven governorships Democrats flipped during the 2018 cycle. Rauner's 38.8% of the vote was the worst performance for an incumbent Illinois governor since 1912; he also received the lowest percentage of the vote for a Republican since 1912. With Pritzker winning by a margin of 15.7%, this was the biggest gubernatorial margin of victory for a Democrat since 1932. He was the first Democrat to carry DuPage County since 1932, Kane and Kendall counties since 1852, and DeKalb County since 1972.

== Background ==
The primaries and general elections coincided with those for federal congressional races and those for other state offices. The election was part of the 2018 Illinois elections. Primary elections were held on March 20.

For the primary election, turnout was 25.76%, with 2,046,710 votes cast. For the general election, turnout was 56.15%, with 4,547,657 votes cast.

== Republican primary ==
=== Candidates ===
==== Nominated ====
- Bruce Rauner, incumbent governor
  - Running mate: Evelyn Sanguinetti, incumbent lieutenant governor

==== Eliminated in primary ====
- Jeanne Ives, state representative
  - Running mate: Richard Morthland, Rock Island County board member and former state representative

==== Withdrew ====
- William J. Kelly, radio host and perennial candidate (running as an independent)
  - Running mate: Brian Leggero, candidate for mayor of Rockford in 2017
  - Former running mate: Ray Tranchant, immigration activist

=== Endorsements ===
Jeanne Ives

Illinois legislators

- Senator Tim Bivins (R-Dixon)
- Representative Peter Breen (R-Lombard)
- Senator Kyle McCarter (R-Lebanon)
- Representative Margo McDermed (R-Frankfort)
- Representative David McSweeney (R-Cary)
- Representative Tom Morrison (R-Palatine)
- Representative Allen Skillicorn (R-East Dundee)
- Representative Barbara Wheeler (R-Crystal Lake)

Local officials

- Cook County Board of Review Commissioner Dan Patlak
- Naperville Township Highway Commissioner Warren Dixon
- Wheatland Township Trustee Raquel Mitchell

Individuals

- Mike Gallagher, radio host and conservative political commentator
- Virginia Halas McCaskey, principal owner of the Chicago Bears
- Laura Ingraham, radio host and Fox News host
- Dan Proft, entrepreneur and radio talk show host
- Bill Whittle, conservative blogger and political commentator

Local Republican parties

- Chicago Republican Party
- Fremont Township Republican Organization
- Lake County Republican Assembly
- Rock Island County Republican Party
- Wauconda Township Republican Club
- Wheatland Township Republican Organization
- Wheeling Township Republican Organization

Organizations

- Illinois Family Institute
- Susan B. Anthony List
- Taxpayers United of America

Newspapers and magazines

- Daily Journal
- National Review
- Rockford Register Star
Declined to endorse in primary

Individuals

- Congressman John Shimkus of Illinois's 15th congressional district; announced he would support the Republican nominee in the general election

=== Campaign ===
A November 2017 Capitol Fax/We Ask America poll found that 83% of Republican voters had never heard of Ives. Ives' campaign's fourth-quarter fundraising totals were around $500,000. On February 28, 2018, Ives' campaign released a new book entitled The Governor You Don't Know: The Other Side of Bruce Rauner, authored by Chicago GOP chairman and Ives campaign chairman Chris Cleveland, with a foreword by conservative State Representative Tom Morrison.

Rauner and Ives held their first and only scheduled forum on January 29, before the Chicago Tribune editorial board." Rauner largely ignored his opponent and focused on attacking Speaker Mike Madigan, comparing him to his likely Democratic challenger, J. B. Pritzker. Ives, on the other hand, attacked Rauner for being an ineffective governor and alienating social conservatives. Shortly after the debate, conservative Lake Forest businessman Richard Uihlein donated $500,000 to Ives' campaign.

Rauner and Ives were invited by the University of Illinois Springfield to debate a second time; Rauner declined the invitation.

Ives released an ad titled "Thank You, Bruce Rauner" on February 3, 2018, in an attempt to challenge her opponent's commitment to conservative values. Her ad featured actors outfitted to portray a transgender woman, an anti-fascist protester wearing a hood and a bandana over his face, a member of the Chicago Teachers Union and a Women's March activist. After Ives' ad made its rounds on the internet, advocacy groups, some Republicans and Democrats lashed out against Ives, calling her video bigoted and offensive. The ad increased Ives's profile and name recognition. Three Chicago-area newspaper editorial boards came out against the ad: the Chicago Tribune said "The portrayals are demeaning;" the Daily Herald said that Ives should take down the ad, which "attacks people of Illinois, not opponent", and the Chicago Sun-Times wrote, "Jeanne Ives goes for the bully vote with her TV ad."

=== Polling ===
Poll source	Date(s) administered	Sample size	Margin of error	Bruce Rauner	Jeanne Ives	Undecided
Ogden & Fry (R-Ives)	March 14, 2018	787	± 3.5%	42%	35%	23%
Southern Illinois University	February 19–25, 2018	259	± 6.0%	51%	31%	18%
We Ask America	January 14–16, 2018	1,026	± 3.1%	65%	21%	15%
We Ask America	October 25–29, 2017	1,064	± 3.0%	64%	19%	16%
Ogden & Fry (R-Liberty Principles PAC)	October 12, 2017	495	± 4.5%	59%	14%	28%

Hypothetical polling

Poll source	Date(s) administered	Sample size	Margin of error	Bill Brady	Jeanne Ives	Kyle McCarter	Dan Proft	Bruce Rauner	Undecided
Ogden & Fry (R-Liberty Principles PAC)	October 2, 2017	545	± 4.3%	9%	5%	2%	8%	22%	54%

=== Results ===
Despite a 14% decrease in Republican primary votes cast, Rauner increased his overall vote total by 9% compared to the 2014 primary. In 2018, he managed to capture a narrow majority of the votes, with 51.5%, in his victory over conservative Ives. By comparison, in 2014 Rauner only received 40.2% of the primary vote in his narrow win victory over Kirk Dillard, Bill Brady, and Dan Rutherford.

In 2018, Rauner did well in central Illinois compared to the Republican primary four years earlier, when he managed 30% in the downstate region and finished 2nd to Kirk Dillard. In 2018, he carried the region with 52%.

However, the result was still considered surprisingly close, and indicated widespread dissatisfaction with Rauner's governorship among more conservative Republicans.

Results by county Map legend: Rauner—60–70%; Rauner—50–60%; Tie; Ives—50–60%; Ives—60–70%

Republican primary results
Party	Candidate	Votes	%
Republican	Bruce Rauner (incumbent)	372,124	51.53%
Republican	Jeanne Ives	350,038	48.47%
Total votes		744,248	100.00%

== Democratic primary ==
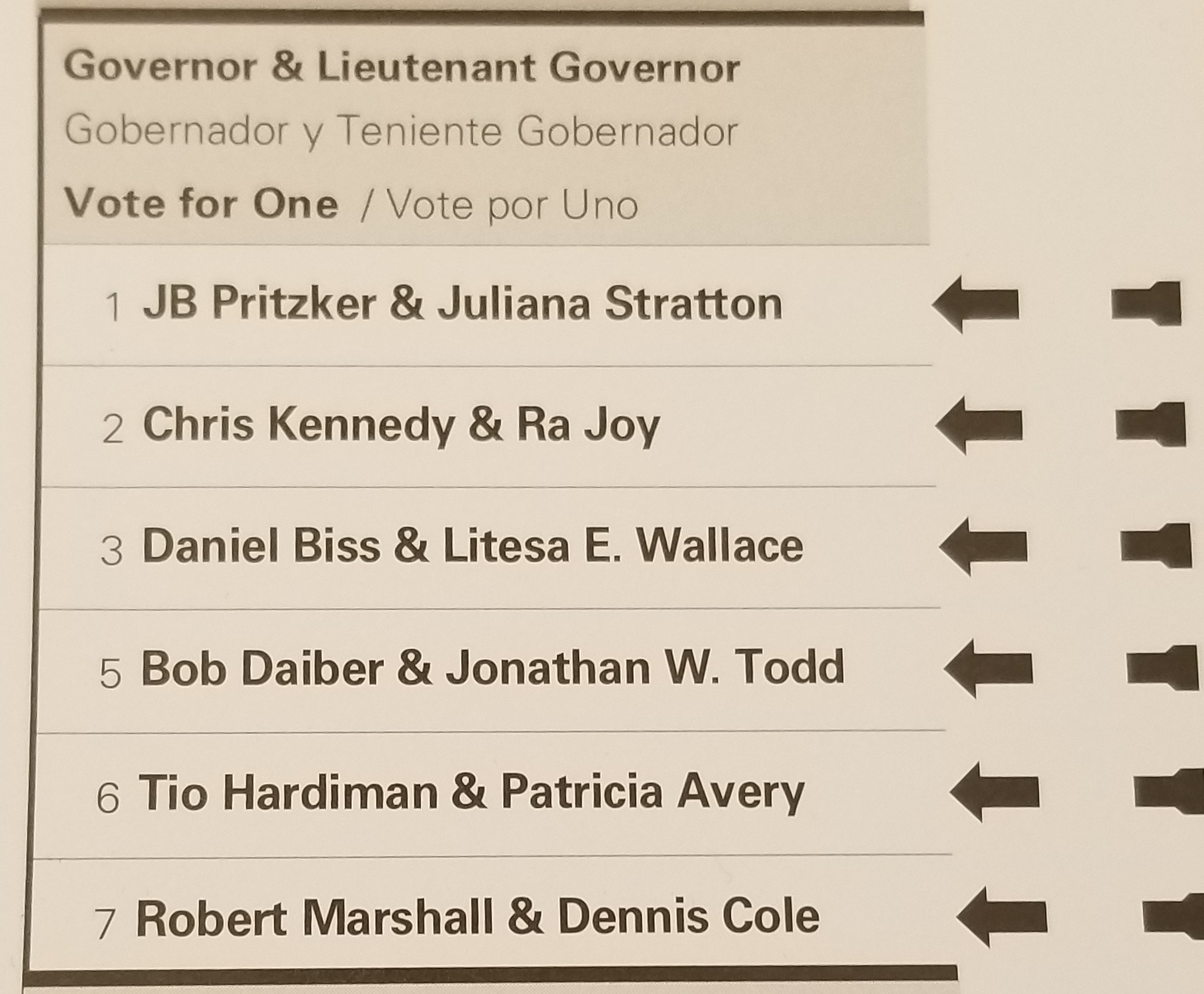
Democratic candidates listed on a blank ballot

=== Candidates ===
==== Nominated ====
- JB Pritzker, venture capitalist and candidate for Illinois's 9th congressional district in 1998

- Running mate: Juliana Stratton, state representative

==== Eliminated in primary ====
- Daniel Biss, state senator

- Running mate: Litesa Wallace, state representative
- Former running mate: Carlos Ramirez-Rosa, Chicago Alderman

- Bob Daiber, Madison County Regional Superintendent of Schools

- Running mate: Jonathan W. Todd, social worker

- Tio Hardiman, former director of CeaseFire and candidate for governor in 2014

- Running mate: Patricia Avery, president and CEO of the Champaign County chapter of the NAACP

- Chris Kennedy, former chairman of the University of Illinois Board of Trustees and member of the Kennedy family

- Running mate: Ra Joy, nonprofit executive

- Robert Marshall, physician and perennial candidate

- Running mate: Dennis Cole

==== Removed from ballot ====
- Terry Getz, corrections officer (filed on November 29, 2017, but did so without a running mate or submitting any signatures)

==== Withdrew ====
- Scott Drury, state representative (running for attorney general)

- Running mate: Alex Hirsch, political operative

- Alex Paterakis, civil engineer and business owner
- Ameya Pawar, Chicago Alderman

- Running mate: Tyrone Coleman, mayor of Cairo

==== Declined ====
- Cheri Bustos, U.S. representative
- Arne Duncan, former United States Secretary of Education
- Dick Durbin, U.S. senator
- Mike Frerichs, Illinois Treasurer
- Valerie Jarrett, former Senior Advisor to the President
- Robin Kelly, U.S. representative
- Lisa Madigan, Illinois Attorney General
- Andy Manar, state senator
- Barack Obama, former president of the United States and U.S. senator
- Michelle Obama, former First Lady of the United States
- Penny Pritzker, former United States Secretary of Commerce
- Pat Quinn, former governor of Illinois (ran for Attorney General)
- Heather Steans, state senator
- Kurt Summers, Chicago city treasurer

=== Endorsements ===
Daniel Biss

U.S. senators

- Former senator Adlai Stevenson III

U.S. representatives

- Congresswoman Marcia L. Fudge of Ohio's 11th congressional district
- Congresswoman Robin Kelly of Illinois's 2nd congressional district

Statewide officeholders

- Former lieutenant governor Sheila Simon

State senators

- Senator Omar Aquino (D-Chicago)
- Senator Bill Cunningham (D-Chicago)
- Senate president pro tempore Don Harmon (D-Oak Park)
- Senator David Koehler (D-Peoria)
- Senator Pat McGuire (D-Braidwood)
- Senator John Mulroe (D-Chicago)
- Senator Laura Murphy (D-Des Plaines), Democratic Committeewoman for Maine Township
- Senator Steve Stadelman (D-Rockford)

State representatives

- Representative Carol Ammons (D-Urbana)
- Representative Kelly Cassidy (D-Chicago)
- Representative Will Davis (D-Homewood)
- Representative Robyn Gabel (D-Evanston)
- Representative Will Guzzardi (D-Chicago)
- Representative Theresa Mah (D-Chicago)
- Former Assistant Majority Leader Elaine Nekritz (D-Northbrook)
- Representative Litesa Wallace (D-Rockford), endorsed Biss June 28, 2017 and became his running mate September 8, 2017
- Representative Ann Williams (D-Chicago)

Chicago aldermen

- Alderman John Arena of the 45th ward
- Alderman Roberto Maldonado of the 26th ward
- Alderwoman Susan Sadlowski Garza of the 10th Ward
- Former Alderman Dick Simpson of the 44th Ward of Chicago and Department Head and Professor of Political Science at University of Illinois Chicago
- Alderman Scott Waguespack of the 32nd Ward

Other local officials

- Chemberly Cummings, Normal city council member
- Elliot Hartstein, former mayor of Buffalo Grove, Illinois
- Eamon Kelly, Evanston Township Democratic Committeeman
- Elizabeth Lindquist, Roscoe Township trustee
- Marge Paul, city clerk of Berwyn, Illinois
- Tari Renner, mayor of Bloomington, Illinois
- Debra Shore, Metropolitan Water Reclamation District of Greater Chicago commissioner
- Alderman Robin Rue Simmons of Evanston's 5th ward
- Jose Villalobos, Elgin Township trustee and founder of Progressives of Kane County

Organizations

- 314 Action, pro-science advocacy group supporting scientists who run for office
- 45th Ward Independent Democrats
- Berwyn United
- BlackRoots Resistance
- Champaign County Young Democrats
- College Democrats at Illinois State University
- Democratic Party of the 49th Ward
- Democratic Party of Evanston
- Democrats of Northfield Township
- Illinois NOW
- Indivisble NW IL
- Indo-American Democratic Organization
- Knox College Democrats
- McLean County Democrats
- MoveOn.org
- National Association of Social Workers
- National Nurses United
- Network 49
- New Trier Democratic Party
- Northside DFA
- ONE People's Campaign
- Our Revolution
- Our Revolution Illinois
- People's Action
- Planned Parenthood Illinois Action
- Reclaim Chicago
- Sierra Club of Illinois
- WIU College Democrats

Individuals

- John Cusack, actor
- Jesse Eisenberg, actor, author, and playwright
- John Green, author and internet personality
- Howie Klein, activist, music producer, founder of the DownWithTyranny! blog
- Lawrence Lessig, Roy L. Furman Professor of Law at Harvard Law School and political activist
- Donna Miller, vice president of Illinois Democratic Women
- Pussy Riot, anti-Putin protest and activist punk-rock band
- Kathleen Rooney, author and educator
- Richard Thaler, winner of the 2017 Nobel Memorial Prize in Economic Sciences

Newspapers

- Chicago Maroon
- The Columbia Chronicle
- The Daily Northwestern
- Herald & Review
- The Pantagraph
- Rockford Register Star

Withdrawn endorsements

- Congressman Brad Schneider of Illinois's 10th congressional district
Chris Kennedy

U.S. cabinet and cabinet-level officials

- William M. Daley, 32nd United States Secretary of Commerce and 24th White House Chief of Staff

U.S. representatives

- Congressman Danny K. Davis of Illinois's 7th congressional district
- Former congressman Phil Hare of Illinois's 17th congressional district (2007–2011)
- Congressman Joe Kennedy III of Massachusetts's 4th congressional district (2013-2021)
- Congressman Bobby Rush of Illinois's 1st congressional district

State legislators

- Former president of the Illinois Senate Emil Jones

Local officeholders

- Cook County Commissioner Chuy García
- Lori Lightfoot, chair of the Chicago Police Accountability Task Force
- Alderman Ricardo Muñoz of Chicago's 22nd ward

Individuals

- Dan Aykroyd, actor and comedian
- Larry David, comedian and writer
- Dolores Huerta, civil rights and labor union activist
- Keegan-Michael Key, comedian and actor
- Barbra Streisand, singer and actress

Organizations

- Iroquois County Democratic Central Committee
- Southern Illinois Democratic County Chairmen's Association

Newspapers

- Chicago Tribune
- Daily Herald
- Journal Star
- The State Journal-Register
Declined to endorse for the primary

U.S. representatives

- Jan Schakowsky

Organizations

- Madison County Democratic Party

=== Forums ===
The Illinois LGBTQ Forum: The Democratic Candidates for Governor was held on December 6, 2017, and organized by Affinity Community Services, the Association of Latinos/as Motivating Action (ALMA), the Equality Illinois Institute, and Pride Action Tank. Candidates who attended included Daniel Biss, Tio Hardiman, Ameya Pawar, J. B. Pritzker, and Chris Kennedy.

Whitney Young High School hosted the first student-run gubernatorial debate in the United States on October 4, 2017. All seven then-current candidates attended, meaning Daniel Biss, Bob Daiber, Tio Hardiman, Chris Kennedy, Alex Paterakis, Ameya Pawar, and JB Pritzker.

The Illinois chapter of progressive advocacy organization Our Revolution sponsored a forum at the Chicago Teachers Union headquarters on October 8, 2017. Candidates voiced similar opinions on single-payer health care, gun control, and the minimum wage, but differed on a hypothetical state deal with Amazon and relationships with powerful Illinois Speaker Mike Madigan.

The Democratic candidates held their first televised debate on January 23. All six candidates met again a week later on January 30. The debate was not televised but was uploaded to WSIL-TV's YouTube channel.

Another debate was held on February 21, which was hosted by the University of Illinois Springfield. Chris Kennedy did not attend due to a back injury, although all five other candidates participated. Another major debate took place on March 1. It involved issues such as gun control, Blagojevich's tapes, sexual harassment, and relatability. Another debate took place the next day in Springfield. The topics involved Madigan, sexual harassment, among other issues. The spotlight remained on the top contenders: Chris Kennedy, JB Pritzker, and Daniel Biss.

Pritzker was criticized for refusing to commit to attend the only live-television debate planned outside the Chicago media market, prompting the debate's cancellation. Biss and Kennedy gathered petition signatures to encourage the debate's continuation, and Biss commented that "JB is borrowing a page from the billionaire playbook, avoiding debates and shunning reporters who ask tough questions." Another debate took place on March 14, revolving around topics including Pritzker's newly reported offshore holdings, Illinois House Speaker Mike Madigan, and education. Kennedy and Biss both attacked Pritzker on the offshore businesses, Kennedy "saying it's like a job interview, and Pritzker lying to get the job", and Biss saying "Pritzker did that to avoid taxes".

=== Polling ===
Poll source	Date(s) administered	Sample size	Margin of error	Daniel Biss	Chris Kennedy	JB Pritzker	Other	Undecided
Victory Research	March 13–16, 2018	1,204	± 2.8%	22%	26%	32%	–	16%
We Ask America	March 7–9, 2018	1,029	± 3.1%	15%	16%	35%	1% (Note: Bob Daiber with 1%; Tio Hardiman and Robert Marshall with <1%)	31%
Southern Illinois University	February 19–25, 2018	472	± 4.5%	21%	17%	31%	6% (Note: Tio Hardiman with 2%; Bob Daiber, Robert Marshall, Terry Getz, and other with 1%)	25%
Global Strategy Group (D-Pritzker)	February 9–13, 2018	802	± 3.5%	21%	23%	37%	–	–
ALG Research (D-Biss)	February 6–11, 2018	500	± 4.4%	24%	24%	32%	4% (Note: Tio Hardiman with 2%; Bob Daiber and Robert Marshall with 1%)	16%
Victory Research	February 6–7, 2018	1,209	± 2.8%	24%	17%	27%	5% (Note: Tio Hardiman and Bob Daiber with 2%; Robert Marshall with 1%)	28%
Global Strategy Group (D-Pritzker)	February 1, 2018	801	± 3.5%	22%	16%	41%	–	21%
Global Strategy Group (D-Pritzker)	February 1, 2018	801	± 3.5%	32%	–	52%	–	16%
We Ask America	January 29–30, 2018	811	± 3.4%	17%	12%	30%	3%	38%
We Ask America	October 17–18, 2017	1,154	± 3%	6%	15%	39%	2% (Note: Bob Daiber and Tio Hardiman with 1%)	36%
ALG Research (D-Biss)	July 2017	–	–	5%	23%	30%	2% (Note: Tio Hardiman and Robert Marshall with 1%; Bob Daiber with 0%)	35%
Garin-Hart-Yang (D-Kennedy)	June 26–29, 2017	602	± 4%	–	44%	38%	–	18%
Greenberg Quinlan Rosner (D-Summers)	March 2–6, 2017	500	± 4.4%	–	44%	11%	7% (Note: Kurt Summers with 7%)	34%

Hypothetical polling

Poll source	Date(s) administered	Sample size	Margin of error	Dick Durbin	Pat Quinn	Chris Kennedy	Undecided
We Ask America	July 27, 2016	1,128	± 3.0%	49%	10%	5%	18%

=== Results ===
Results by county Map legend: Pritzker—70–80%; Pritzker—60–70%; Pritzker—50–60%; Pritzker—40–50%; Pritzker—30–40%; Biss—40–50%; Kennedy—30–40%; Kennedy—40–50%

Pritzker won 98 of Illinois's counties. Kennedy and Biss both won two counties each.

Democratic primary results
Party	Candidate	Votes	%
Democratic	JB Pritzker	597,756	45.13%
Democratic	Daniel Biss	353,625	26.70%
Democratic	Chris Kennedy	322,730	24.37%
Democratic	Tio Hardiman	21,075	1.59%
Democratic	Bob Daiber	15,009	1.13%
Democratic	Robert Marshall	14,353	1.08%
Total votes		1,324,548	100.00%

== Third parties and independents ==
In order to qualify as an established party in Illinois, a candidate for said party must earn at least 5% of the vote in a statewide election. This last occurred in 2006, when Rich Whitney won 10% of the vote, allowing the Illinois Green Party to achieve such status. Established party status comes with benefits. For example, candidates of an established party needs only 5,000 voter signatures on its petitions to gain ballot access. For non-established parties this number is approximately 25,000.

For the 2018 election, non-established parties did not need to run a full slate in order to qualify for ballot access.

=== Conservative ===
Sam McCann, a longtime intraparty opponent of Bruce Rauner, resigned from the Republican Caucus to run for governor as a member of the newly created Conservative Party.

==== Candidates ====
- Sam McCann, state senator
  - Running mate: Aaron Merreighn, activist and United States Marine Corps veteran

=== Libertarian ===
Kash Jackson was the Libertarian nominee. Libertarian nominees for governor, other statewide offices, and the General Assembly were chosen by the Libertarian Party of Illinois at a state convention on March 3, 2018, in Bloomington, Illinois. Jackson appeared on the ballot.

==== Candidates ====
- Kash Jackson, Navy veteran and activist
  - Running mate: Sanj Mohip

==== Endorsements ====
Kash Jackson

Individuals

- Austin Petersen, Libertarian candidate for president of the United States in 2016 and candidate for U.S Senate in Missouri for 2018
- Larry Sharpe, business consultant and candidate for vice president of the United States in 2016, Libertarian nominee for New York governor in 2018

==== Unsuccessful ====
- Matthew C. Scaro, entrepreneur and Libertarian activist
- Jon Stewart, retired professional wrestler, Republican candidate for the state house in 1998 and Republican candidate for IL-05 in 2009

=== Independents ===
==== Removed from ballot ====
- Gregg Moore
  - Magistrale Morgan
- Mary Vann-Metcalf
- Dock Walls, perennial candidate
  - Jim Tobin, founder of Taxpayers United of America

==== Withdrew ====
- William J. Kelly, radio host and perennial candidate (subsequently ran on Constitution Party ticket, then withdrew)
  - Running mate: Brian Leggero, candidate for mayor of Rockford in 2017

=== Constitution ===
==== Nominee ====
William J. Kelly was nominated for governor and Chad Koppie, a member of the Kane County Regional Board of School Trustees, was nominated for lieutenant governor on the gubernatorial ticket of the Illinois Constitution Party. However, on June 5, 2018, Kelly dropped out and endorsed the third party campaign of Sam McCann.

===== Withdrew =====
- William J. Kelly, radio host and perennial candidate (endorsed Sam McCann)

=== Green Party ===
The Green Party ran a slate of statewide candidates in 2006 and 2010, but failed to be placed on the ballot in 2014 and declined to run any statewide candidates in 2018.

== General election ==
Bruce Rauner had been rated as one of, if not the most, vulnerable governor running for re-election in 2018 by Politico and the National Journal. Following his surprisingly narrow primary win, Rauner offered former state senator Karen McConnaughay, attorney general nominee Erika Harold, Chicago Cubs co-owner and Republican National Committee Finance Chair Todd Ricketts and Illinois Republican Party Committeeman Richard Porter the chance to replace him on the ticket, with the promise that he would continue to fully fund the campaign using his personal wealth. Rauner consistently trailed Pritzker in the polls by large margins, and the race was rated as a likely Democratic win by all major election prognosticators.

=== Endorsements ===
Bruce Rauner (R)

U.S. governors

- Eric Greitens (R-Missouri; resigned office June 1, 2018)
- Eric Holcomb (R-Indiana)
- Scott Walker (R-Wisconsin)

Illinois state senators

- Senator Bill Brady (R-Bloomington)
- Senator John Curran (R-Woodridge)

Illinois state representatives

- Representative Patti Bellock (R-Hinsdale)
- Representative Tom Bennett (R-Gibson City)
- Minority Leader Jim Durkin (R-Western Springs)
- Assistant Republican Leader Bill Mitchell (R-Decatur)
- Representative Grant Wehrli (R-Naperville)
- Representative Christine Winger (R-Wood Dale)

County officials

- Dan Cronin, chairman of the DuPage County Board and former member of the Illinois Senate

Local officials

- Rodney Craig, village president of Hanover Park, Illinois

Organizations

- Associated Builders and Contractors
- Cook County Republican Party
- Evanston Township Republican Organization
- Illinois Chamber of Commerce
- Illinois Manufacturers' Association
- National Federation of Independent Business
- Palatine Township Republican Organization
- Winfield Township Republican Organization

Newspapers

- Chicago Tribune
- Herald & Review
- The Herald-News
- The Marion Republican
- The News-Gazette
- The Pantagraph
- State Journal-Register
JB Pritzker (D)

Former U.S. executive branch officials

- Joe Biden, 47th vice president of the United States
- Barack Obama, 44th president of the United States

U.S. cabinet and cabinet-level officials

- Hillary Clinton, 67th United States Secretary of State and 2016 Democratic nominee for president
- Penny Pritzker, 38th United States Secretary of Commerce and sister of J.B. Pritzker.

U.S. senators

- Tammy Duckworth, United States senator from Illinois.
- Dick Durbin, United States senator from Illinois and Senate minority whip

U.S. representatives

- Cheri Bustos, congresswoman from Illinois's 17th congressional district
- Jerry Costello, former congressman from Illinois's 12th congressional district
- Bill Foster, congressman from Illinois's 11th congressional district
- Luis Gutiérrez, congressman from Illinois's 4th congressional district
- Robin Kelly, congresswoman from Illinois's 2nd congressional district
- Glenn Poshard, former congressman from Illinois's 19th congressional district and nominee for governor in 1998
- Mike Quigley, congressman from Illinois's 5th congressional district
- Jan Schakowsky, U.S. congresswoman from Illinois's 9th congressional district

Statewide officials

- Justin Fairfax, lieutenant governor of Virginia
- Mike Frerichs, Illinois Treasurer
- Terry McAuliffe, former governor of Virginia
- Susana Mendoza, Illinois Comptroller.
- Jesse White, Illinois Secretary of State

State senators

- Daniel Biss, state senator and former candidate
- James Clayborne, senate majority leader
- William R. Haine, assistant senate majority leader
- Terry Link, Democratic assistant majority leader of the Illinois Senate and chair of the Lake County Democratic Party
- Andy Manar, state senator.
- Heather Steans, state senator.

State representatives

- Dan Beiser, state representative
- LaToya Greenwood, state representative
- Greg Harris, assistant house majority leader.
- Jay Hoffman, house majority conference chairperson
- Jim Kirkpatrick, former state representative (2017) and chair of the Williamson County Democratic Party
- Katie Stuart, state representative

Local officials

- Ed Burke, alderman from Chicago's 14th ward
- Walter Burnett Jr., alderman for Chicago's 27th ward
- George Cardenas, alderman from Chicago's 12th ward
- Mark Guethle, North Aurora village trustee and chair of the Kane County Democratic Party
- Chris Kennedy, former chair of the University of Illinois Board of Trustees
- Jeff Mears, past Johnson County commissioner and chair of the Johnson County Democratic Party
- Bob Oglesby, past member of the Saline County Board and chairman of the Saline County Democratic Party
- Milly Santiago, alderman from Chicago's 31st ward
- Daniel Solis, alderman from Chicago's 25th ward
- Kurt Summers, Chicago city treasurer
- Chris Taliaferro, alderman from Chicago's 29th ward
- Flint Taylor, Flannigan Township Trustee and chair of the Hancock County Democratic Party
- Doris Turner, member of the Springfield, Illinois City Council and chair of the Sangamon County Democratic Party
- Jim Underwood, member of the Richland Community College Board of Trustees and chair of the Macon County Democratic Party
- Gilbert Villegas, Alderman from Chicago's 36th ward

Individuals

- Mike Barone, chair of the Jackson County Democratic Party
- Brenda Britton, chair of the Richland County Democratic Party
- Karamo Brown, television personality and activist
- Dennis Fisher, chair of the Shelby County Democratic Party
- Paul "Snow" Herkert, chair of the Calhoun County Democratic Party
- Gary Johnson, chair of the Jasper County Democratic Party
- Phillip Matthews, chair of the Alexander County Democratic Party
- Jack Mazzotti, chair of the Christian County Democratic Party
- Shirley McCombs, chair of the Menard County Democratic Party
- Jimmy Naville, chair of the Greene County Democratic Party
- Keith Niewohner, chair of the Adams County Democratic Party
- John Penn, chair of the McLean County Democratic Party
- Dan Sidwell, chair of the Bond County Democratic Party

Organizations

- Citizen Action Illinois
- Cook County Democratic Party
- Equality Illinois
- Equality Illinois PAC
- Illinois AFL–CIO
- Illinois Democratic County Chairmen's Association
- Illinois Education Association
- Illinois Federation of Teachers
- Northwestern Illinois Building Trades
- Personal PAC
- Planned Parenthood Illinois Action
- The Sierra Club Illinois Chapter
- St. Clair County Democratic Central Committee

Newspapers

- The Chicago Sun-Times
- Crain's Chicago Business
- The Daily Herald
- Dispatch-Argus
- Quad-City Times
- The Southern Illinoisan
Kash Jackson (L)

U.S. governors

- Gary Johnson, former governor of New Mexico, Libertarian Party candidate for president in 2012 and 2016, and for U.S. senator from New Mexico in 2018

State representatives

- Allen Skillicorn, Illinois state representative for the 66th District

Organizations

- 71 Republic
- Heartland Newsfeed
- Operation Honor
- Red In a Blue State

Individuals

- Collin Cliburn, founder of the Illinois Separation
- Christopher Marks, candidate running for the Libertarian Party presidential nomination in 2020
- Austin Petersen, Libertarian candidate for president of the United States in 2016 and candidate for U.S Senate in Missouri for 2018
- Larry Sharpe, business consultant and candidate for vice president of the United States in 2016, Libertarian nominee for New York governor in 2018

Withdrawn endorsements

- David Williams III, 2019 Independent candidate for Chicago's 48th ward and political activist

=== Debates ===
Dates	Location	Pritzker	Rauner	McCann	Jackson	Link
September 20, 2018	Chicago, Illinois	Participant	Participant	Participant	Participant	Full debate – C-SPAN
October 3, 2018	Chicago, Illinois	Participant	Participant	Not invited	Not invited	4 parts – ABC 7 Chicago
October 11, 2018	Quincy, Illinois	Participant	Participant	Not invited	Not invited	Full debate – C-SPAN

=== Predictions ===
Source	Ranking	As of
The Cook Political Report	Likely D (flip)	October 26, 2018
The Washington Post	Likely D (flip)	November 5, 2018
FiveThirtyEight	Likely D (flip)	November 5, 2018
Rothenberg Political Report	Likely D (flip)	November 1, 2018
Sabato's Crystal Ball	Likely D (flip)	November 5, 2018
RealClearPolitics	Likely D (flip)	November 4, 2018
Daily Kos	Likely D (flip)	November 5, 2018
Fox News (Note: The Fox News Midterm Power Rankings uniquely does not contain a category for Safe/Solid races)	Likely D (flip)	November 5, 2018
Politico	Likely D (flip)	November 5, 2018
Governing	Likely D (flip)	November 5, 2018

=== Fundraising ===
Campaign finance reports as of June 30, 2018
Candidate (party)	Total receipts	Total disbursements	Cash on hand
JB Pritzker (D)	$128,252,532.95	$88,571,672.99	$39,680,860.96
Bruce Rauner (R)	$78,725,390.39	$45,101,897.60	$33,623,492.79
Sam McCann (C)	$1,497,885.08	$649,634.08	$848,251.00
Kash Jackson (L)	$10,783.00	$1,985.32	$8,797.68
Source: Federal Election Commission

=== Polling ===
View source data.

Poll source	Date(s) administered	Sample size	Margin of error	Bruce Rauner (R)	J. B. Pritzker (D)	Kash Jackson (L)	Sam McCann (C)	Other	Undecided
Victory Research	November 1–3, 2018	1,208	± 2.8%	33%	49%	5%	8%	–	6%
Ipsos	September 27 – October 5, 2018	968	± 4.0%	30%	50%	3%	6%	2%	8%
Victory Research	September 27 – October 2, 2018	1,208	± 2.8%	32%	47%	6%	7%	–	8%
Southern Illinois University	September 24–29, 2018	715	± 3.7%	27%	49%	4%	4%	–	17%
ALG Research (D-Forward Illinois)	September 21–25, 2018	1,007	± 3.1%	32%	48%	3%	4%	–	–
Research America Inc.	September 5–13, 2018	1,024	± 3.1%	27%	44%	4%	6%	0%	14%
Marist College	August 12–16, 2018	734	± 4.4%	30%	46%	6%	4%	2%	13%
University of Illinois Springfield	July 3 – August 15, 2018	717	± 3.7%	23%	35%	–	–	15%	23%
Victory Research	August 12–14, 2018	1,208	± 2.8%	30%	41%	2%	9%	–	18%
Baselice & Associates (C-McCann)	July 25–29, 2018	800	± 3.5%	29%	42%	6%	11%	1%	10%
Illinois Public Opinion (D)	July 12, 2018	423	± 5.0%	26%	39%	1%	10%	–	23%
Victory Research	June 26–28, 2018	1,208	± 2.8%	30%	45%	2%	5%	–	18%
We Ask America	June 9–11, 2018	600	± 4.0%	27%	36%	–	–	26%	11%
Victory Research	May 22–24, 2018	1,208	± 2.8%	32%	47%	–	–	–	–
Victory Research	April 18–21, 2018	1,208	± 2.8%	31%	49%	–	–	–	19%
Ogden & Fry	March 23, 2018	667	± 3.9%	28%	46%	–	–	–	26%
Southern Illinois University	February 19–25, 2018	1,001	± 3.0%	35%	50%	–	–	–	15%
Public Policy Polling (D-Biss)	February 5–6, 2018	600	± 3.3%	35%	48%	–	–	–	17%
Ogden & Fry (R-Liberty Principles PAC)	October 2, 2017	517	± 4.4%	30%	47%	–	–	–	23%

Hypothetical polling

with Jeanne Ives and J. B. Pritzker

Poll source	Date(s) administered	Sample size	Margin of error	Jeanne Ives (R)	J. B. Pritzker (D)	Undecided
Ogden & Fry (R-Liberty Principles PAC)	October 2, 2017	517	± 4.4%	20%	40%	40%

with Bruce Rauner and Chris Kennedy

Poll source	Date(s) administered	Sample size	Margin of error	Bruce Rauner (R)	Chris Kennedy (D)	Undecided
Ogden & Fry (R-Liberty Principles PAC)	October 2, 2017	517	± 4.4%	28%	41%	31%

with Bruce Rauner and Daniel Biss

Poll source	Date(s) administered	Sample size	Margin of error	Bruce Rauner (R)	Daniel Biss (D)	Undecided
Paul Simon Institute	February 19–25, 2018	1,001	± 3.0%	34%	48%	18%
Public Policy Polling (D-Biss)	February 5–6, 2018	600	± 3.3%	30%	47%	23%

with Bruce Rauner and generic Democrat

Poll source	Date(s) administered	Sample size	Margin of error	Bruce Rauner (R)	Generic Democrat	Undecided
Normington Petts (D-DGA)	July 18–20, 2017	600	± 4.0%	37%	49%	14%
Anzalone Liszt Grove (D)	February 15–20, 2017	800	± 3.5%	32%	47%	21%
Normington Petts (D-DGA)	January 3–5, 2017	600	± 4.0%	35%	45%	20%

Poll source	Date(s) administered	Sample size	Margin of error	Kyle McCarter (R)	J. B. Pritzker (D)	Undecided
Ogden & Fry (R-Liberty Principles PAC)	October 2, 2017	517	± 4.4%	22%	42%	36%

Poll source	Date(s) administered	Sample size	Margin of error	Kyle McCarter (R)	Chris Kennedy (D)	Undecided
Ogden & Fry (R-Liberty Principles PAC)	October 2, 2017	517	± 4.4%	21%	42%	37%

Poll source	Date(s) administered	Sample size	Margin of error	Dan Proft (R)	J. B. Pritzker (D)	Undecided
Ogden & Fry (R-Liberty Principles PAC)	October 2, 2017	517	± 4.4%	25%	42%	33%

Poll source	Date(s) administered	Sample size	Margin of error	Dan Proft (R)	Chris Kennedy (D)	Undecided
Ogden & Fry (R-Liberty Principles PAC)	October 2, 2017	517	± 4.4%	23%	43%	34%

Poll source	Date(s) administered	Sample size	Margin of error	Bill Brady (R)	J. B. Pritzker (D)	Undecided
Ogden & Fry (R-Liberty Principles PAC)	October 2, 2017	517	± 4.4%	26%	42%	32%

Poll source	Date(s) administered	Sample size	Margin of error	Bill Brady (R)	Chris Kennedy (D)	Undecided
Ogden & Fry (R-Liberty Principles PAC)	October 2, 2017	517	± 4.4%	25%	42%	33%

with Jeanne Ives and Chris Kennedy

Poll source	Date(s) administered	Sample size	Margin of error	Jeanne Ives (R)	Chris Kennedy (D)	Undecided
Ogden & Fry (R-Liberty Principles PAC)	October 2, 2017	517	± 4.4%	19%	38%	43%

with Bruce Rauner and Dick Durbin

Poll source	Date(s) administered	Sample size	Margin of error	Bruce Rauner (R)	Dick Durbin (D)	Undecided
We Ask America	July 26, 2016	824	± 3.5%	35%	44%	22%

=== Results ===
2018 Illinois gubernatorial election
Party	Candidate	Votes	%	±%
Democratic	JB Pritzker	2,479,746	54.53%	+8.18%
Republican	Bruce Rauner (incumbent)	1,765,751	38.83%	−11.44%
Conservative	Sam McCann	192,527	4.23%	N/A
Libertarian	Kash Jackson	109,518	2.40%	−0.95%
Write-in		115	0.01%	-0.02%
Total votes		4,547,657	100.00%	N/A
Democratic gain from Republican				

==== Counties that flipped from Republican to Democratic ====
- Alexander (largest city: Cairo)
- Champaign (largest city: Champaign)
- DeKalb (largest city: DeKalb)
- DuPage (largest city: Aurora)
- Fulton (largest city: Canton)
- Jackson (largest city: Carbondale)
- Kane (largest city: Aurora)
- Kendall (largest city: Oswego)
- Knox (largest city: Galesburg)
- Lake (largest city: Waukegan)
- Peoria (largest city: Peoria)
- Rock Island (largest city: Moline)
- St. Clair (largest city: Belleville)
- Will (largest city: Joliet)
- Winnebago (largest city: Rockford)

==== By congressional district ====
Pritzker won 13 of the 18 congressional districts, with the remaining five going to Rauner. Each candidate won two districts that elected representatives of the other party.

District	Rauner	Pritzker	Representative
1st	22%	74%	Bobby Rush
2nd	19%	77%	Robin Kelly
3rd	39%	56%	Dan Lipinski
4th	15%	81%	Chuy García
5th	29%	67%	Mike Quigley
6th	50%	45%	Sean Casten
7th	14%	83%	Danny Davis
8th	40%	54%	Raja Krishnamoorthi
9th	31%	65%	Jan Schakowsky
10th	40%	55%	Brad Schneider
11th	38%	56%	Bill Foster
12th	45.6%	46.1%	Mike Bost
13th	42%	46%	Rodney Davis
14th	51%	43%	Lauren Underwood
15th	60%	29%	John Shimkus
16th	50%	39%	Adam Kinzinger
17th	44%	47%	Cheri Bustos
18th	55%	33%	Darin LaHood

== See also ==
- 2018 Illinois elections
