= Richard Morthland =

American politician

Rich Morthland

Member of the Illinois House of Representatives from the 71st district
- In office January 2011 – January 2013
- Preceded by: Mike Boland
- Succeeded by: Mike Smiddy

Personal details
- Born: November 10, 1959 (age 66)
- Party: Republican
- Spouse: Betsey Morthland
- Children: 2
- Education: St. Ambrose University (BA); Denver Seminary (M.Div.); Spring Arbor University (MA)

Richard Morthland (born November 10, 1959) is an American politician who is a member of the Rock Island County Board and was a Republican member of the Illinois General Assembly for a single term from 2011 to 2013. Morthland served on the Rock Island County Board from 2008 to 2011 and was reelected to the County Board in 2016. Morthland has a bachelor's degree from St. Ambrose University, master's degrees from Denver Seminary and Spring Arbor University, and is a doctoral student at Denver Seminary. In addition to politics, Morthland is a former assistant professor at Black Hawk College and is a farmer on his family's farm that dates back to 1842 when it was homesteaded in Coe Township.

On October 28, 2017, it was announced that Morthland would be the running mate of State Representative Jeanne Ives in the 2018 Republican primary against incumbent governor Bruce Rauner and incumbent lieutenant governor Evelyn Sanguinetti. The Ives-Morthland ticket lost receiving 48.60% of the vote to Rauner-Sanguinetti's 51.40% of the vote.
