= Thank You, Bruce Rauner =

- Client: Jeanne Ives for Governor
- Market: Illinois
- Language: English
- Media: television
- Running time: 60 seconds
- Release date: February 2, 2018
- Country: United States

Thank You, Bruce Rauner was a 2018 political advertisement against the gubernatorial campaign of incumbent Republican governor Bruce Rauner of Illinois. The ad was aired by Illinois state representative Jeanne Ives, a fellow Republican who was challenging Rauner in the Republican gubernatorial primary. In the commercial, which parodied a commercial Rauner had aired the previous year in support of his re-election, a variety of actors — portraying, among others, a transgender woman, a Women's March protester, and a Chicago schoolteacher — thank Rauner for signing legislation which they believe benefitted them, and which was opposed by conservatives in the state legislature.

Upon its release, the commercial was accused of transphobia, sexism, and racism; it drew criticism from Republican and Democratic figures, including the chair of the Illinois Republican Party, who urged Ives to pull the commercial. Ives resisted pressure to pull the ad, contending that it drew attention to Rauner's record and that its criticisms were aimed at policies, not people.

== Background ==
In the Republican primary for the 2018 Illinois gubernatorial election, incumbent governor Bruce Rauner faced one opponent, state representative Jeanne Ives. Ives had initially been supportive of Rauner's agenda, but grew critical of him on the grounds that he was insufficiently conservative. A central theme of her campaign was that she "stands up for middle-class families". Rauner initially downplayed Ives's electoral prospects in the primary, deeming her a "fringe candidate" and refraining from addressing her; however, Ives was perceived as gaining momentum following a $500,000 donation from a Republican donor and a debate hosted by the Chicago Tribune editorial board.

In Fall 2017, Rauner released a commercial in support of his re-election campaign titled Thanks, Mike, in which Republican governors of states bordering Illinois sardonically thanked Mike Madigan, the Democratic speaker of the Illinois House of Representatives, for "blocking Rauner’s reforms". However, in January 2018, the Rauner pulled the ad from the air, one day after one of the governors appearing in it — Missouri's Eric Greitens — confessed that he'd had an extramarital affair with a stylist. The framing of Ives's Thank You, Bruce Rauner commercial was ultimately modeled on that commercial.

== Synopsis ==
In Ives's commercial, several actors thank Rauner for supporting legislation; the issues highlighted in the ad had already been central to Ives's campaign. An actress portraying a Women's March protestor, wearing a symbolic pink hat, thanks the governor "for making all Illinois families pay for my abortions", referring to Illinois House Bill 40, which permitted state-funded health insurance plans, such as Medicaid and those for state employees, to cover abortions. An actor with a deep voice, portraying a trans woman, thanks the governor "for signing legislation that lets me use the girl’s bathroom", referring to Illinois House Bill 1785, which made it easier for trans individuals to change the gender on their birth certificates. Another actress, playing a member of the Chicago teachers’ union, thanks Rauner for the state-funded bailout of Chicago city schools. An actor wearing a black hoodie and a bandana thanks Rauner "for opposing law enforcement and making Illinois a sanctuary state for illegal immigrant criminals".

== Release ==
The ad began airing during the weekend of February 2, 2018. It was one of two to be included in statewide buys for Ives's campaign; the other spot, which was deemed "more conventional" and focused on Ives's biography, was aired locally during the 2018 Super Bowl. Ives spent $1 million on television commercials in February 2018, divided between the two spots.

== Reception ==
Multiple media outlets criticized the commercial as being transphobic or mocking trans people, due to its portrayal of a trans woman; the ad was also accused of sexism, racism, and homophobia. The Cut called the ad "anti-woman, anti-trans, anti-immigrant, and racist" and also accused the ad of being inaccurate, observing that House Bill 1785, the transgender rights bill, was not a "bathroom bill", and dealt only with birth certificate revisions. Quartz argued that the ad was an attack not on Rauner's record, but on "certain US voters".

The commercial was also condemned by multiple Democrats and Republicans upon its release. Some Ives supporters initially accused Capitol Fax, the state politics blog which broke the news of the commercial, of "making up" the ad. Tim Schneider, the chair of the Illinois Republican Party, issued a statement calling the ad "a cowardly attempt to stoke political division" and accusing it of "attack(ing) our fellow Illinoisans based on their race, gender, or humanity." Schneider also called on Ives to pull down the ad. The former chair of the Illinois Republican Party, Pat Brady, alleged in a Tweet that the ad showed Ives as "we have known for years".

Erika Harold, who was running for (and ultimately won) the Republican nomination for Illinois attorney general that year, likewise called on Ives to "immediately take it off the air." The Illinois chapter of the ACLU, an LGBT civil rights advocacy group, the Chicago teachers union, and a pro-choice political action committee also criticized the ad. A spokesperson for the union told the Chicago Tribune that the organization refused to "dignify this racist, sexist, homophobic piece of crap with a response".

In the days following its release, the ad also drew criticism on social media. All three of the Democrats vying for their party's gubernatorial nomination condemned the commercial as well.

=== Defense ===
Ives responded to the criticism by arguing that the ad was an attack on Rauner's policies, not on Rauner personally; she also suggested that the ad would be seen as humorous if it had aired on a comedy program such as Saturday Night Live, and alleged that the state party was reluctant to criticize Rauner because of his political donations. Her campaign also released a statement quoting a member of the party's state central committee, who argued that the ad was "unambiguous" and factually accurate. Ives further penned a letter to the editor of the Madison-St. Clair Record on February 6, discussing some of the issues she believed Illinois faced, and explained that "what the commercial that is generating the expected hysteria from the expected quarters attempted to do, admittedly provocatively, was to properly and truthfully characterize the extreme issue positions Rauner took and their implications".

== Legacy ==
As of February 5, three days after the release of the commercial, Ives trailed Rauner in primary polls by 40 percentage points. Ives ultimately lost the Republican primary to Rauner by about three percentage points, a performance that was regarded as a near-upset. During the 2018 general election, Democratic nominee J. B. Pritzker released an ad titled Thank You which parodied the same Rauner commercial as Thank You, Bruce Rauner.
