= Peter Breen =

Peter Breen may refer to:

- Peter Breen (figure skater) (born 1969), American ice dancer
- Peter Breen (Australian politician) (born 1947), former Australian politician
- Peter Breen (Illinois politician), member of the Illinois State House of Representatives

== See also ==
- Peter W. Breene (1846–1926), Colorado politician
