= Jeanne Ives =

American state politician (b. 1964)

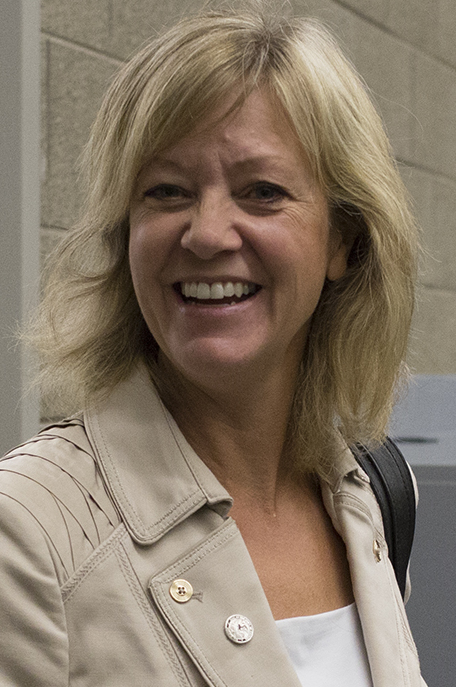
- Ives in 2015

Member of the Illinois House of Representatives from the 42nd district
- In office January 9, 2013 – January 9, 2019
- Preceded by: Sandra M. Pihos (redistricted)
- Succeeded by: Amy Grant

Personal details
- Born: Jeanne Remmes; October 4, 1964 (age 61) Vermillion, South Dakota, U.S.
- Party: Republican
- Spouse: Paul Ives
- Education: United States Military Academy (BS)

Military service
- Allegiance: United States
- Branch/service: United States Army
- Years of service: 1987–1993

Jeanne M. Ives (née Remmes, born October 4, 1964) is an American politician. A Republican, she is a former member of the Illinois House of Representatives for the 42nd district. She was a candidate for governor of Illinois and U.S. representative for Illinois's 6th congressional district.

Ives served three terms in the Illinois House, from 2013 to 2018. She ran in the Republican primary in the 2018 Illinois gubernatorial election, narrowly losing to incumbent governor Bruce Rauner.

Ives was a candidate in the 2020 election for U.S. House in Illinois's 6th congressional district. On March 17, she won the Republican primary against surgeon Jay Kinzler, receiving over 70 percent of the vote. In the November 3 election, she received about 45 percent of the vote, losing to the incumbent, Democrat Sean Casten.

As of November 26, 2022, Jeanne Ives is a member of the Illinois Republican State Central Committee representing Republicans residing in Illinois's 3rd congressional district.

== Early life and career ==
Ives is the third oldest of six children of William H. Remmes and Geraldine Remmes. She graduated from Vermillion High School in South Dakota in 1983. She attended the United States Military Academy and served as an officer in the United States Army. Later, Ives served on the Wheaton City Council.

== Illinois House of Representatives ==
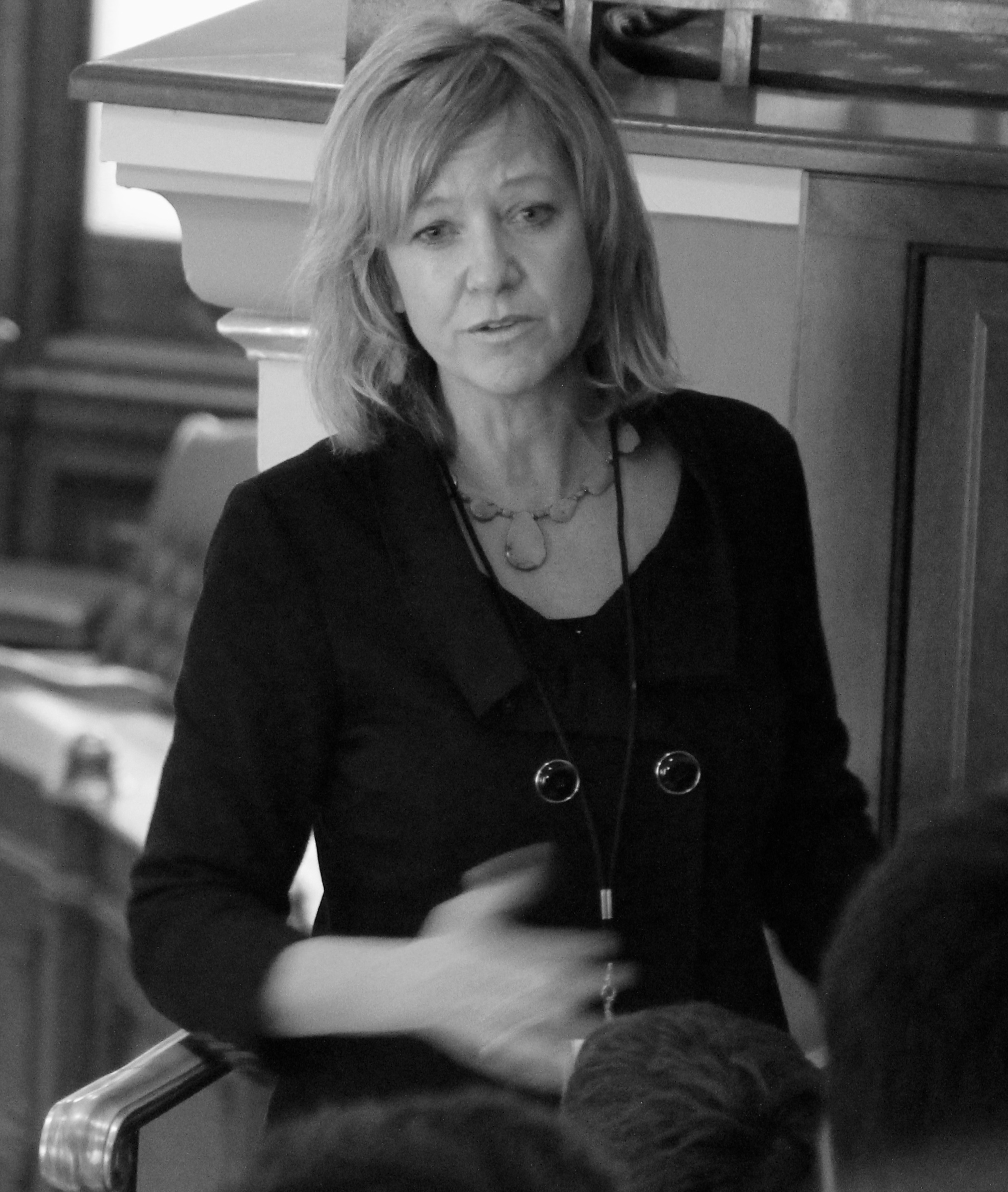
Ives at the Illinois State Capitol in 2014

Ives was elected to the Illinois House of Representatives in 2012.

Ives said on a 2017 radio show, "My best work is actually getting traction on killing legislation that is bad ... which is what my role is as a member of both first the super minority and then the minority." Five of Ives' 134 bills had become law as of 2017, according to the Illinois General Assembly records.

=== Abortion ===
Ives has said she made her decision to challenge Governor Bruce Rauner in the 2018 Republican primary after Rauner signed HB-40 into law, which ensures that abortion remains legal in Illinois even if the U.S. Supreme Court overturned Roe v. Wade, while also enabling Medicaid and state-employee health insurance to pay for abortions, in September 2017.

=== Education ===
When she ran for governor, Ives advocated consolidating school districts in Illinois to save money. She pointed out that Florida (which has a population similar to Illinois) has 100 districts, while Illinois has 852 districts.

In 2015, it was disclosed that the College of DuPage, a community college and the second largest institution of higher learning in Illinois, had decided to pay its president, Robert Breuder, $763,000 to leave his position three years early. Ives sponsored legislation (HB 3593) that prohibited college boards from giving departing presidents more than one year's salary and benefits, as well as limiting standard contracts to four years and requiring public notice. House Democrats narrowed the scope of the bill to community colleges, and it was passed by the legislature. The following year, HB 3593 was replicated and applied to all Illinois institutions of higher education.

=== Immigration ===
Ives has called for Illinois' TRUST Act, signed into law in August 2017, to be repealed, saying it creates a "sanctuary state", something that Politifact Illinois said was false.

=== LGBT politics ===
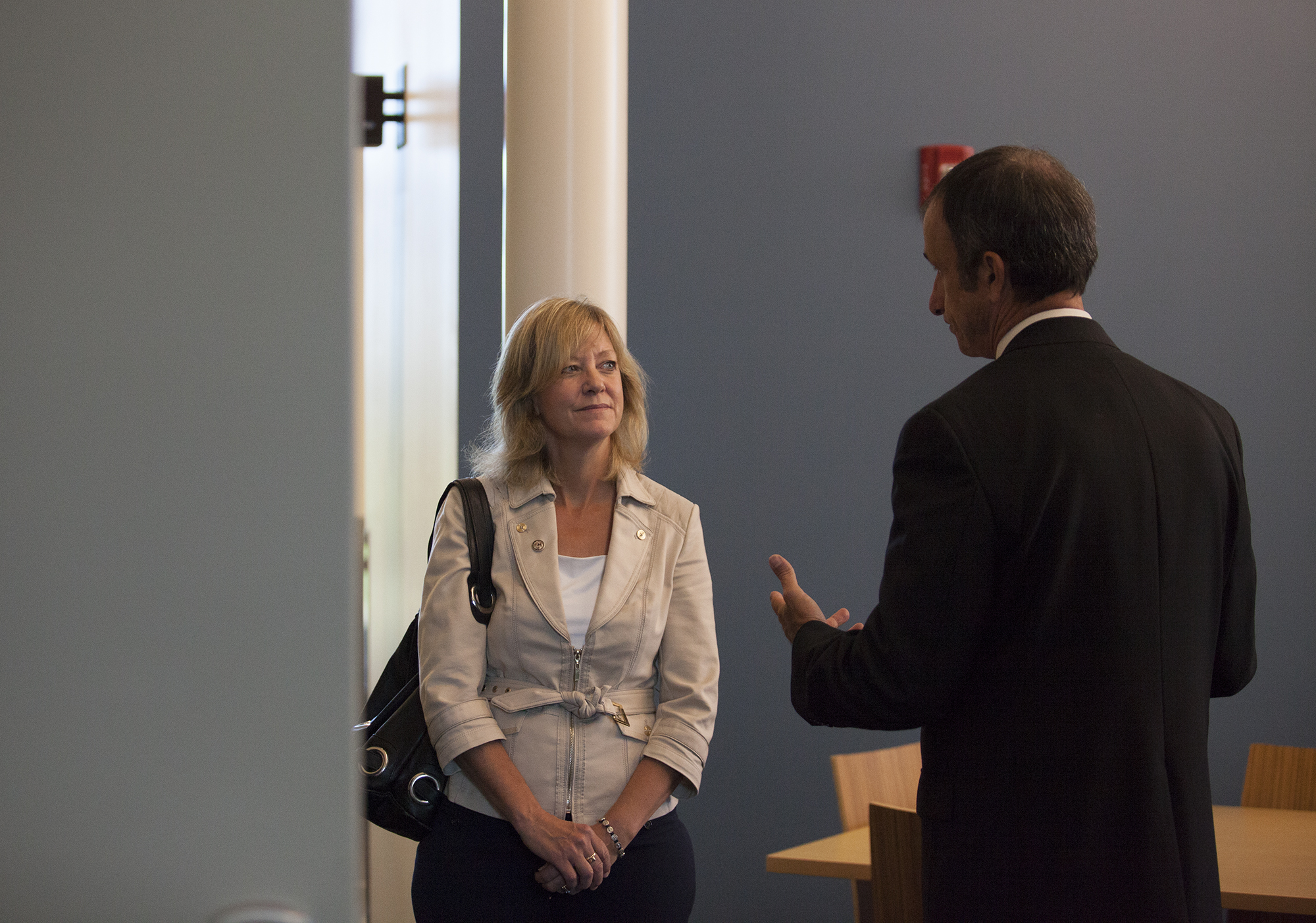
Ives in 2015

In March 2013, Ives said in an interview that same-sex marriages are a "completely disordered relationship" and said LGBT people were trying to "weasel their way" into acceptability. Ives said that the concept of marriage as between one man and one woman "cannot be legislated away or redefined." When a law authorizing gay marriage passed the Illinois General Assembly, in November 2013, Ives said, "The fact is that this bill is the worst in the U.S. for protecting religious liberty."

In 2014, Ives joined the majority of her colleagues in the House in rejecting a ban on gay conversion therapy. Illinois banned gay conversion therapy for LGBT youths in 2015.

In March 2016, a Chicago man was arrested for a felony after making two threatening phone calls to Ives over her views on same-sex marriage. The man was found guilty in July 2016 of two counts of threatening a public official, a class 3 felony.

Ives opposed a 2017 bill that would make it easier for transgender people to change their birth certificates to reflect their gender identity. On a radio show, she called transgender rights "junk science."

Ives opposes adoption by gay couples in Illinois.

=== Drug policy ===
In May 2016, Ives voted against extending the sunset date of the program that legalized cannabis for medical purposes. In December 2017, she said that "the marijuana experiment in Colorado has failed. The kids are using marijuana and traffic accidents are up because of it. Illinois should not build an economy based on vice like they have in Colorado."

=== Minimum wage ===
In May 2017, Ives voted against legislation (Senate Bill 81) in May 2017 that would have raised the minimum wage in Illinois to $15 per hour by the year 2022.

== 2018 Illinois gubernatorial primary challenge ==
On October 28, 2017, Ives announced that she would challenge incumbent governor Bruce Rauner in the Republican primary to become Illinois Governor. Her running mate was former state representative Richard Morthland of Cordova, Illinois. Ives agreed with Rauner on traditional Republican issues like pension reform, term limits, and lower property taxes; her major policy differences with Rauner were on social issues.

In the Republican primary on March 20, 2018, Rauner defeated Ives, 51.5 percent to 48.5 percent. Rauner went on to lose to Democrat J.B. Pritzker in the general election by a sixteen-point margin.

== 2020 U.S. House campaign ==
In July 2019, Ives announced that she would run for the U.S. House in Illinois's 6th congressional district. Ives was opposed in the primary by Evelyn Sanguinetti, who dropped out of the race in October 2019, and surgeon Jay Kinzler. In March 2020, Ives won the Republican nomination, setting up a general election against Democratic incumbent Sean Casten.

In October 2020, the New York Times reported that Ives had paid $55,000 over the preceding three years to Locality Labs, a company running purported news sites, for articles that included verbatim copies of her news releases. Ives was listed by the company as one of its "story watchers", or clients. Ives said that the payments were to create her website and to monitor her Wikipedia page.

Ives lost the November 3 election. Casten received 213,777 votes (52.82 percent) and Ives received 183,891 votes (45.43 percent), with Libertarian Bill Redpath getting 7,079 votes (1.75 percent).

Illinois 6th Congressional District Republican Primary, 2020
Party	Candidate	Votes	%
Republican	Jeanne Ives	29,144	70.80
Republican	Gordon (Jay) Kinzler	12,017	29.19
Republican	Richard Mayers	1	<0.01
Total votes		41,162	100.00

Illinois 6th Congressional District General Election, 2020
Party	Candidate	Votes	%
Democratic	Sean Casten (incumbent)	213,777	52.82
Republican	Jeanne Ives	183,891	45.43
Libertarian	Bill Redpath	7,079	1.75
Total votes		404,747	100.00
