= The Daily Republican =

Newspaper in Marion, Illinois, US

- Type: Daily newspaper
- Format: Broadsheet
- Owner: Southern Illinois LOCAL Media Group
- Publisher: Lynne Campbell
- Ceased publication: 2026
- Headquarters: 502 West Jackson Street, Marion, Illinois 62959, United States
- OCLC number: 27159756
- Website: dailyrepublicannews.com

The Daily Republican was an American daily newspaper published Mondays through Fridays in Marion, Illinois. In 1987, the paper was acquired by Hollinger. Former owner GateHouse Media purchased roughly 160 daily and weekly newspapers from Hollinger in 1997.

The newspaper covered Williamson County, including the communities of Carterville, Herrin, Johnston City and Marion.

In 2026, at least 13 papers owned by Paddock Publications ceased, including the Daily Republican.
