= Sandra M. Pihos =

American politician

Sandy Pihos

Member of the Illinois House of Representatives from the 48th district 42nd district (2003–2013)
- In office January 2003 – January 2015
- Preceded by: Tim Schmitz (Redistricted)
- Succeeded by: Peter Breen

Personal details
- Born: June 11, 1946 (age 80) Pittsburgh, Pennsylvania, U.S.
- Party: Republican
- Education: University of Mount Union (BS); Northern Illinois University (MEd)

Sandra M. "Sandy" Pihos (born June 11, 1946) is the former Republican member of the Illinois State Representative for the 42nd and 48th districts. She currently resides in the western Chicago suburb of Glen Ellyn.

Representative Pihos served on eight committees: Committee of the Whole, Elementary and Secondary Education, Housing and Urban Development, Mass Transit, Telecommunications, Tourism and Conventions, Paratransit, and Subcommittee on School Code Waivers.

In her run for a seventh term in 2014, Pihos was defeated in the March Republican primary by Peter Breen, who went on to win the general election.

Pihos was arrested for retail theft in the fall of 2017 and pled guilty to a single misdemeanor count in June 2018.
