= Illinois budget impasse =

21st century 793-day-long U.S. state budget crisis

The Illinois budget impasse was a 793-day-long (2 years and 62 days) budget crisis in the state of Illinois. From July 1, 2015, to August 31, 2017, Illinois was without a complete state budget for fiscal years 2016, 2017, and part of 2018. As a result, many state agencies had to cut services or continue borrowing to operate. The budget impasse has adversely affected Illinois' economy, its credit rating, and public confidence in Illinois' state government.

== Background ==
According to the Constitution of Illinois, the Governor is required to submit a balanced budget proposal for the next fiscal year to the Illinois General Assembly. The General Assembly, in turn, must pass a balanced budget and send it to the Governor's desk to sign before the beginning of the new fiscal year on June 30. Historically, Illinois governors have presented budget proposals in mid-February, allowing around four and a half months of negotiations before the deadline. Each fiscal year starts on July 1 and ends on June 30 of the following year. Each fiscal year is also named after the year in which it ends; for example, fiscal year 16 (FY16) started on July 1, 2015, and ended June 30, 2016.

Although the recent Illinois budget impasse is not the first in the state's history, it is the longest. At the beginning of July 2007, disagreements between then-governor Rod Blagojevich and the General Assembly delayed the FY08 budget by six weeks. Under Governor Pat Quinn, Illinois went 16 days in FY10 without a budget.

== Fiscal year 2015 ==
On January 12, 2015, Bruce Rauner was sworn in as the 42nd Governor of Illinois. During the 2014 Illinois gubernatorial election, Rauner ran against incumbent governor Pat Quinn on a platform of a series of reforms dubbed "The Turnaround Agenda." The Turnaround Agenda included but was not limited to proposals such as unemployment insurance reform, tort reform, right-to-work reform, and collective bargaining reform. Upon his ascension to the governorship, Governor Rauner intended to act on the Turnaround Agenda. These reforms were largely supported by Illinois' Republican legislators, but largely opposed by Illinois' Democratic legislators, including Illinois Speaker of the House Michael Madigan.

At the time, Illinois was still in FY15 with a budget that had been signed by then-governor Quinn the previous summer. That budget would not expire until June 30, 2015.

== Fiscal year 2016 ==
From January 12, 2015, until February 18, 2015, the Illinois Governor's Office of Management and Budget, in conjunction with Illinois' state agencies, crafted a proposed FY16 budget which Governor Rauner introduced in a budget address on February 18, 2015. Both Governor Rauner and Speaker Madigan continued to disagree on how to implement a balanced budget. Governor Rauner insisted that the objectives listed in his Turnaround Agenda, rather than raising taxes, were essential for revitalizing Illinois' economy. Speaker Madigan, on the other hand, insisted that tax increases, rather than budget cuts, were essential.

The General Assembly passed a series of budget bills to the Governor; however, on June 25, 2015, he vetoed most of them. One notable exception to the Governor's veto was a partial budget for the Illinois State Board of Education (ISBE), which manages Illinois' K-12 education. In August 2015 a supplemental education budget would be passed. However, on July 1, 2015, the fiscal year ended without a budget for all state agencies except for ISBE.

As the new fiscal year began, not all spending stopped. State agencies often purchase goods and services from vendors on credit. The agencies are then reimbursed from the State according to appropriations in the budget and, in turn, are able to pay the vendors. However, on September 18, 2015, the Supreme Court of Illinois ordered that the State of Illinois must pay state workers and adhere to federal consent decrees which mandated the continuation of various health and social service programs. While this prevented a government shutdown, it also meant that state agencies were required to continue purchasing services with no way to pay the vendors.

Throughout the remainder of summer and autumn of 2015, negotiations between the Governor and Speaker continued, with few results. As January 2016 approached, the Illinois Governor's Office of Management and Budget began preparing an FY17 proposal despite the fact that FY16 did not yet have a budget.

== Fiscal year 2017 ==
On February 17, 2016, Governor Rauner presented his FY17 budget proposal. In response, in May 2016, the General Assembly attempted to pass its own budget for the Governor to sign, but it failed in the Senate. However, close to midnight on June 30, 2016, a stopgap budget was passed by the General Assembly and signed by the Governor. The stopgap budget provided limited appropriations to help agencies pay off their backlog of bills from FY16, and fully funded all state agencies in FY17 until January 1, 2017. Again, the Illinois State Board of Education was the sole exception, receiving a full-year FY17 budget. No meaningful revenue increases or legislative reforms occurred. Both Governor Rauner and Speaker Madigan admitted that the stopgap budget was not perfect, and neither solved nor ended the budget impasse.

Although the first half of FY17 began with a budget, both Republicans and Democrats in the General Assembly were preoccupied with the 2016 elections. Donald Trump's unpopularity in Illinois provided Democratic candidates with the opportunity to tie Governor Rauner – and by extension, the budget impasse – to Trump. The Illinois Democratic Party performed strongly in the 2016 Illinois elections. Former City Clerk of Chicago Susana Mendoza defeated incumbent Comptroller Leslie Munger, while incumbent senator Mark Kirk lost in a landslide to congresswoman Tammy Duckworth, yet Republicans gained seats in both chambers of the General Assembly. The ruthless campaign atmosphere did not help ongoing negotiations between Governor Rauner and Speaker Madigan.

== Fiscal year 2018 ==
In February 2017, Governor Rauner presented an FY18 budget proposal to the General Assembly. During his address, Governor Rauner mentioned ongoing negotiations for a "Grand Bargain" in the State Senate, although the details of this bargain were yet to be determined. In March 2017, negotiations came to a standstill as the General Assembly failed to vote on the series of bills that included appropriations, tax hikes and freezes, and school funding.

In late June, Governor Rauner announced he would order a special session of the General Assembly to convene until a budget had been passed. On June 30, 2017, House Amendment 2 to Senate Bill 6 passed in the House 90–25. The bill provides some appropriations for FY17. including the Illinois State Board of Education. However, the House adjourned in the early afternoon before voting on the bill. On July 4, 2017, the House passed Senate Bill 6 and sent it to the Governor's desk; however, later that day Governor Rauner vetoed the legislation, claiming that the bill, along with the proposed tax increase, would not address Illinois' fiscal crisis. Later that same day, the Senate voted 39–15 to override the Governor's veto. On July 6, 2017, the Illinois House of Representatives voted 71–42 to override Governor Rauner's veto of an income tax increase and FY17 state budget, providing Illinois with its first full year budget since FY15. Although appropriations in the FY18 budget are ostensibly for FY18 costs only, the budget allows for some of its appropriations to also be used to pay for costs incurred in FY17.

However, the veto override did not fully end the budget impasse, as there was still risk that the state's public school districts would not receive much of their funding for FY18. As of late August 2017, school districts had already missed two regular installments of state aid due to the impasse. A full appropriation for the Illinois State Board of Education depended on replacing Illinois' current school funding formula, called General State Aid, with a new formula called "Evidence-Based Funding." $6.6 billion was appropriated in the Senate Bill 1 for Evidence-Based Funding, when technically that formula was not yet law; General State Aid legally remained the current school funding formula. The $6.6 billion could not be used until Evidence-Based Funding was enacted into law to replace General State Aid. On July 31, Senate Bill 1, a bill which would formally replace General State Aid with Evidence-Based Funding, was sent to the Governor.

On August 1, Governor Rauner submitted an amendatory veto of Senate Bill 1 to the General Assembly. In his veto message, he articulated his disagreements with the bill's mechanisms holding districts harmless and appropriating money for the Chicago Teacher's Pension Fund (CTPF). However, on August 13, the Illinois Senate voted 38–19 to override the Governor's veto, but on August 28, the House failed to override the veto, voting 63–46 while requiring a 3/5 majority. In late August, both Democratic and Republican leaders announced a tentative bipartisan education funding reform compromise bill, Senate Bill 1947. The bill contains much of the language of the defunct Senate Bill 1, including replacing General State Aid with Evidence-Based Funding. On August 28, in wake of the failed override of Senate Bill 1, the House passed Senate Bill 1947 73–34, with 3 voting present. An amendment passed later that day, 38–13 with 4 voting present, and the bill was sent to the Governor. On August 31, the bill was signed into law.

== Credit rating of Illinois ==
Throughout the impasse, Illinois' credit rating has been downgraded by several credit rating agencies. In 2014, Illinois' S&P credit rating was A−, already the worst out of the 50 United States. In October 2016, S&P downgraded Illinois' credit rating from BBB+ to BBB with a negative outlook. In June 2016, Moody's downgraded Illinois' bond ratings to Baa2 from Baa1, also with a negative outlook. These agencies each have cited the lack of a budget and a prolonged history of financial mismanagement as the causes of the downgrades.

In June 2017, S&P threatened to downgrade Illinois' credit rating to junk if an FY18 budget were not passed before the end of the fiscal year. Speaker Madigan wrote a letter to S&P asking them to delay any judgment until after the weekend, promising that the General Assembly would convene on Saturday, July 1 to finish negotiations.

As of November 2023, Illinois' credit rating has seen nine credit upgrades, with a credit rating of A currently exceeding the 2014 credit rating of A−. The main factor influencing this decision, according to Fitch, was the reduction of a bill backlog from a high of $17 billion to just under $500 million.
