= Bruce Rauner =

Governor of Illinois from 2015 to 2019

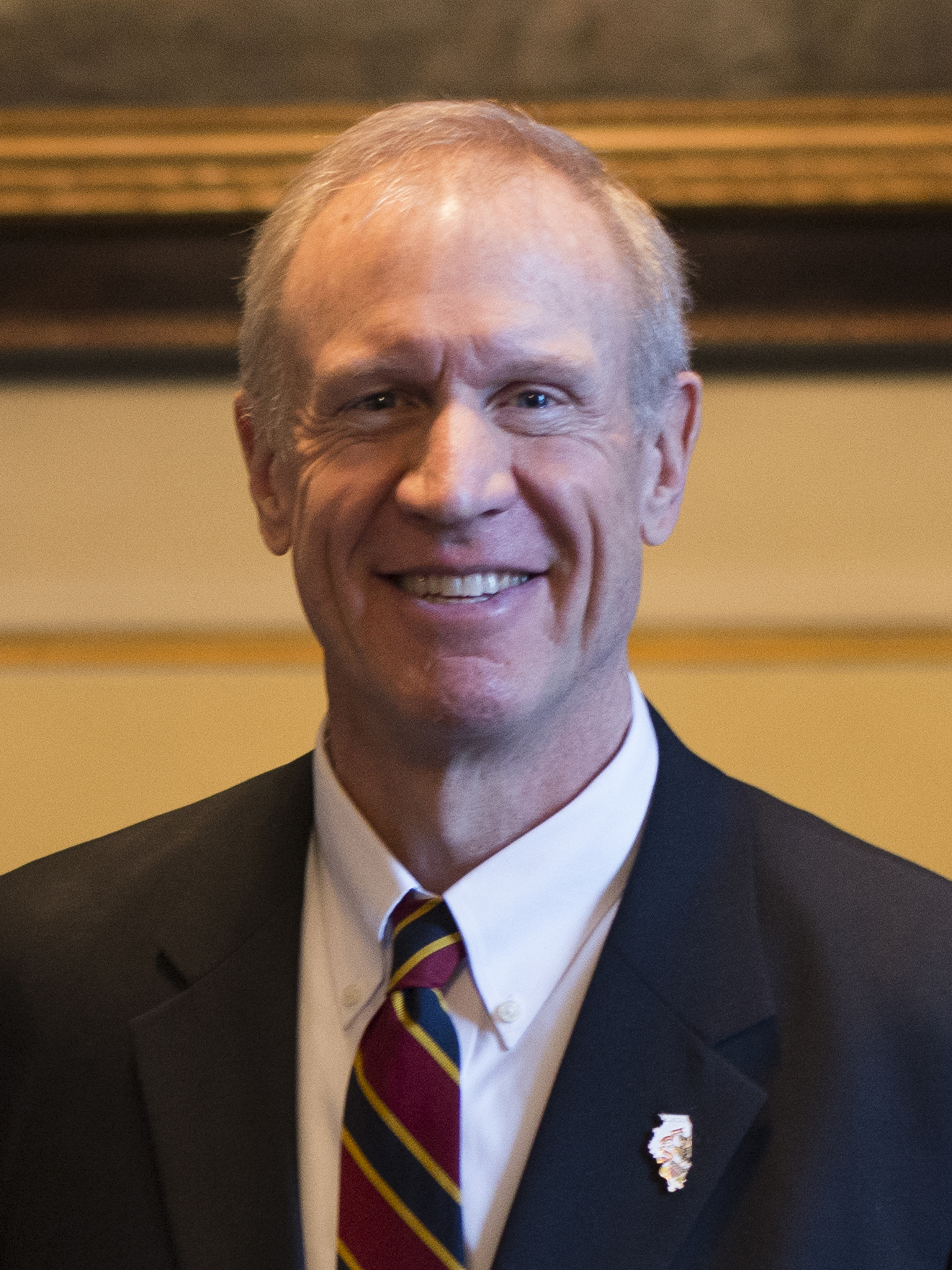
- Rauner in 2017

42nd Governor of Illinois
- In office January 12, 2015 – January 14, 2019
- Lieutenant: Evelyn Sanguinetti
- Preceded by: Pat Quinn
- Succeeded by: JB Pritzker

Personal details
- Born: Bruce Vincent Rauner; February 18, 1956 (age 70) Chicago, Illinois, U.S.
- Party: Republican
- Spouse(s): Elizabeth Wessel (m. 1980; div. 1993) Diana Mendley (m. 1994)
- Children: 6
- Education: Dartmouth College (BA); Harvard University (MBA)

Bruce Vincent Rauner (/ˈraʊnər/; born February 18, 1956) is an American businessman, venture capitalist, and politician who served as the 42nd governor of Illinois from 2015 to 2019. A member of the Republican Party, he had a decades-long career in investment management before entering politics, serving as the co-founder and chairman of Chicago-based private equity firm GTCR. As of 2026, Rauner and his lieutenant governor Evelyn Sanguinetti are the most recent Republicans to have won or held statewide office in Illinois.

Following his retirement as chairman of GTCR in 2012, Rauner shifted his focus from business to civic and political involvement, leading Chicago's tourism bureau and the Chicago Public Education Fund. He announced his candidacy for governor of Illinois in 2013, winning a crowded Republican primary. In the 2014 election, Rauner narrowly defeated incumbent Democratic governor Pat Quinn, winning every county in the state besides Cook County.

Governing as a moderate conservative, Rauner sought to pass right-to-work laws, institute term limits, protect abortion rights, and lower income taxes. However, his agenda was largely stalled by the Democratic supermajorities controlling the Illinois General Assembly. Notably, disagreements between Rauner and Democratic leaders culminated in to a two-year budget crisis. Running for reelection in 2018, he narrowly fended off a primary challenge from conservative State Representative Jeanne Ives. Rauner went on to lose by a large margin to Democratic nominee JB Pritzker.

== Early life and education ==
Rauner was born in Chicago and grew up in Deerfield, Illinois, a suburb 10 miles north of Chicago city limits. His mother, Ann (née Erickson) Rauner, was a nurse, and his father, Vincent Rauner, was a lawyer and senior vice president for Motorola. He has three siblings, Christopher, Mark, and Paula, and is of half Swedish and half German descent. His parents divorced and his father remarried to the former Carol Kopay in 1981. Through his father's second marriage, he has a stepsister, Larisa Olson. His first job was as a paperboy.

Rauner graduated summa cum laude with a degree in economics from Dartmouth College, where he was a brother of Theta Delta Chi. He later received an MBA from Harvard University.

== Business career ==
Rauner was the chairman of private equity firm GTCR, where he had worked for more than 30 years, starting in 1981 after his graduation from Harvard through his retirement in October 2012. A number of state pension funds, including those of Illinois, have invested in GTCR.

In 2013, Rauner opened an office for a self-financed venture firm, R8 Capital Partners. The firm planned to invest up to $15 million in smaller Illinois companies.

Rauner served as Chairman of Choose Chicago, the not-for-profit that is the city's convention and tourism bureau, resigning in May 2013, and as Chairman of the Chicago Public Education Fund. Rauner has also served as the Chairman of the Education Committee of the Civic Committee of The Commercial Club of Chicago.

In 2015, Rauner reported earning over $180 million.

Prior to his 2014 run for Illinois governor, Rauner served as an advisor to Chicago Mayor Rahm Emanuel.

== Philanthropy ==
Rauner was awarded the 2008 Distinguished Philanthropist award by the Chicago Association of Fundraising Professionals. In 2003, Rauner received the Daley Medal from the Illinois Venture Capital Association for extraordinary support to the Illinois economy and was given the Association for Corporate Growth's Lifetime Achievement Award. Rauner and his wife were nominated for the Golden Apple Foundation's 2011 Community Service Award.

Rauner has been a financial supporter of projects including Chicago's Red Cross regional headquarters, the YMCA in the Little Village neighborhood, six new charter high schools, an AUSL turnaround campus, scholarship programs for disadvantaged Illinois public school students, and achievement-based compensation systems for teachers and principals in Chicago Public Schools. He provided major funding for the construction of the Rauner Special Collections Library at Dartmouth College, endowed full professor chairs at Dartmouth College, Morehouse College, University of Chicago, and Harvard Business School, and was the lead donor for the Stanley C. Golder Center for Private Equity and Entrepreneurial Finance at the University of Illinois.

As of 2013, Rauner served on the board of the National Fish and Wildlife Foundation.

Rauner is also a frequent donor to his fraternity at Dartmouth, Theta Delta Chi.

== 2014 gubernatorial campaign ==
Margin of victory or loss per county for Rauner and his opponent, the incumbent Governor Pat Quinn.

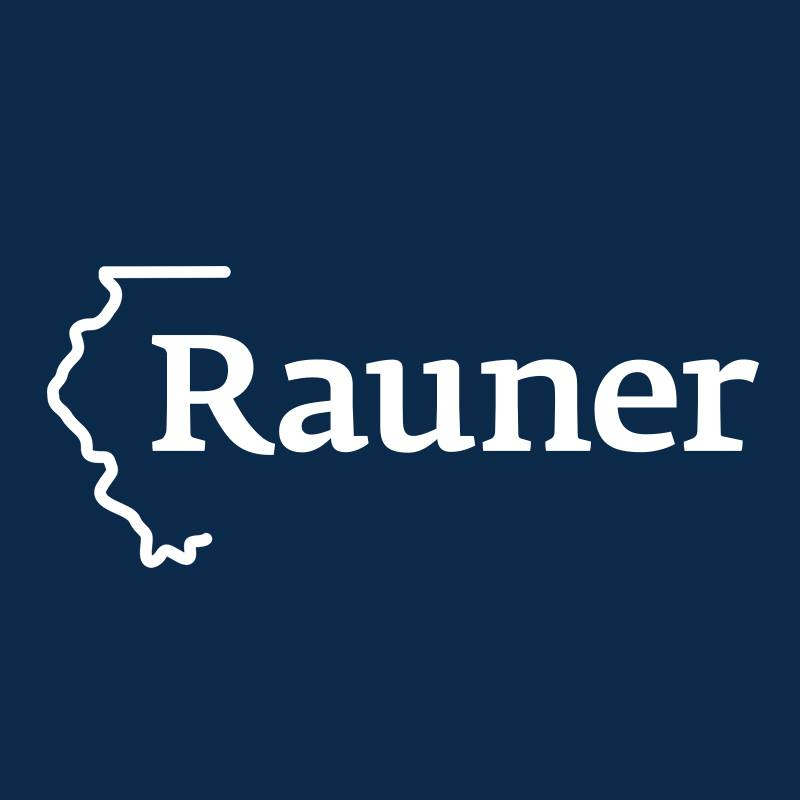
Rauner's 2014 campaign logo

In March 2013, Rauner formed an exploratory committee to look at a run for Governor of Illinois as a Republican. Rauner said that his top priorities included streamlining government, improving education, and improving the state's business climate. He supported term limits and said he would serve no more than eight years (two terms) as governor. On June 5, 2013, Rauner officially announced his candidacy for governor, telling Chicago magazine's Carol Felsenthal that his platform would include overhauling tax policy and freezing property taxes.

In October 2013, Rauner announced that his running mate would be Wheaton City Councilwoman Evelyn Sanguinetti.

Rauner won the March 18, 2014, Republican primary with 328,934 votes (40.13 percent), defeating State Senator Kirk Dillard, who received 305,120 votes (37.22 percent), State Senator Bill Brady (123,708 votes, 15.09 percent) and Illinois Treasurer Dan Rutherford (61,848 votes, 7.55 percrent).

For the general election, Rauner was endorsed by the majority of Illinois newspapers, including the Chicago Tribune, the Daily Herald, and the Chicago Sun-Times.

During the general election, television ads aired regarding Rauner's role in a chain of long-term care homes owned by his companies that faced lawsuits stemming from the death and alleged mistreatment of residents. Among the problems outlined in court cases, state records, and media reports were the deaths of developmentally disabled residents in bathtubs, "deplorable" living conditions, sexual assaults, and a failure by employees to stop residents from harming themselves.

Also during the election, the media reported on a controversy regarding Rauner's daughter being admitted to Walter Payton College Preparatory High School in Chicago in 2008 through the "principal picks" process. The family maintained several residences, including one in downtown Chicago that enabled her to apply to the Chicago-based school. Although she had top grades, she had missed several days of school and therefore did not qualify through the regular admissions process. It was later revealed that Rauner had sought information on this process from his personal friend Arne Duncan, then CEO of Chicago Public Schools. Rauner has said he had no recollection of speaking with Duncan directly. According to another source, she was not a "principal pick", but was let in following the phone call between Bruce Rauner and Arne Duncan. The Rauners donated $250,000 to the school during the subsequent school year; Rauner has a long history of contributing to Chicago Public Schools.

On October 22, 2014, Dave McKinney, a Chicago Sun-Times political reporter and bureau chief, resigned from the paper, citing pressure brought to bear on him by Sun-Times management with regard to his coverage of Rauner. McKinney had completed an investigative news story about a lawsuit filed by Christine Kirk, the CEO of LeapSource, a firm at which Rauner served as director. The piece, written by three reporters and approved by the newspaper's editors, described Rauner using "hardball tactics" to threaten Kirk and her family. According to McKinney's attorney, the Rauner campaign requested the story include that McKinney had a conflict of interest due to his marriage to Ann Liston, a Democratic media consultant; the campaign eventually published details about the Liston's LLC sharing office space with a legally separate, long-term Democratic strategist firm, of which Liston was part-owner. The LLC was employed by a pro-Quinn PAC. McKinney says any notion of conflict of interest was untrue, a position backed up publicly by Sun-Times management. Rauner is a former investor of the Sun-Times and received the newspaper's backing, marking the first time the media organization endorsed any candidate after imposing a moratorium on political endorsements three years earlier.

On November 4, 2014, Rauner was elected Governor of Illinois; Pat Quinn conceded defeat the next day. Rauner received 50.27 percent of the vote, while Quinn won 46.35 percent. Rauner carried every county in the state except for Cook, home to Chicago.

Rauner spent a then-record $26 million of his own money on his election.

== Governor of Illinois ==
Rauner was sworn in as the 42nd governor of Illinois on January 12, 2015. He governed Illinois as a Rockefeller Republican, with liberal stances on several issues including abortion, same-sex marriage, and immigration.

Rauner had a 52% job approval rating after assuming the governorship in 2015, which gradually declined during his term. It stood at 33% in December 2016, ranking 45th of the 50 U.S. governors. In January 2019, as Rauner was leaving office, his approval rating was about 25%.

=== Budget ===
In his first executive order, Rauner halted state hiring as well as discretionary spending and called for state agencies to sell surplus property. The conflict between Rauner's demand for budget cuts and Speaker of the House Mike Madigan's demand for tax increases resulted in the Illinois budget impasse, with major credit agencies downgrading the state's debt to the low investment grade of triple-B by the end of 2015.

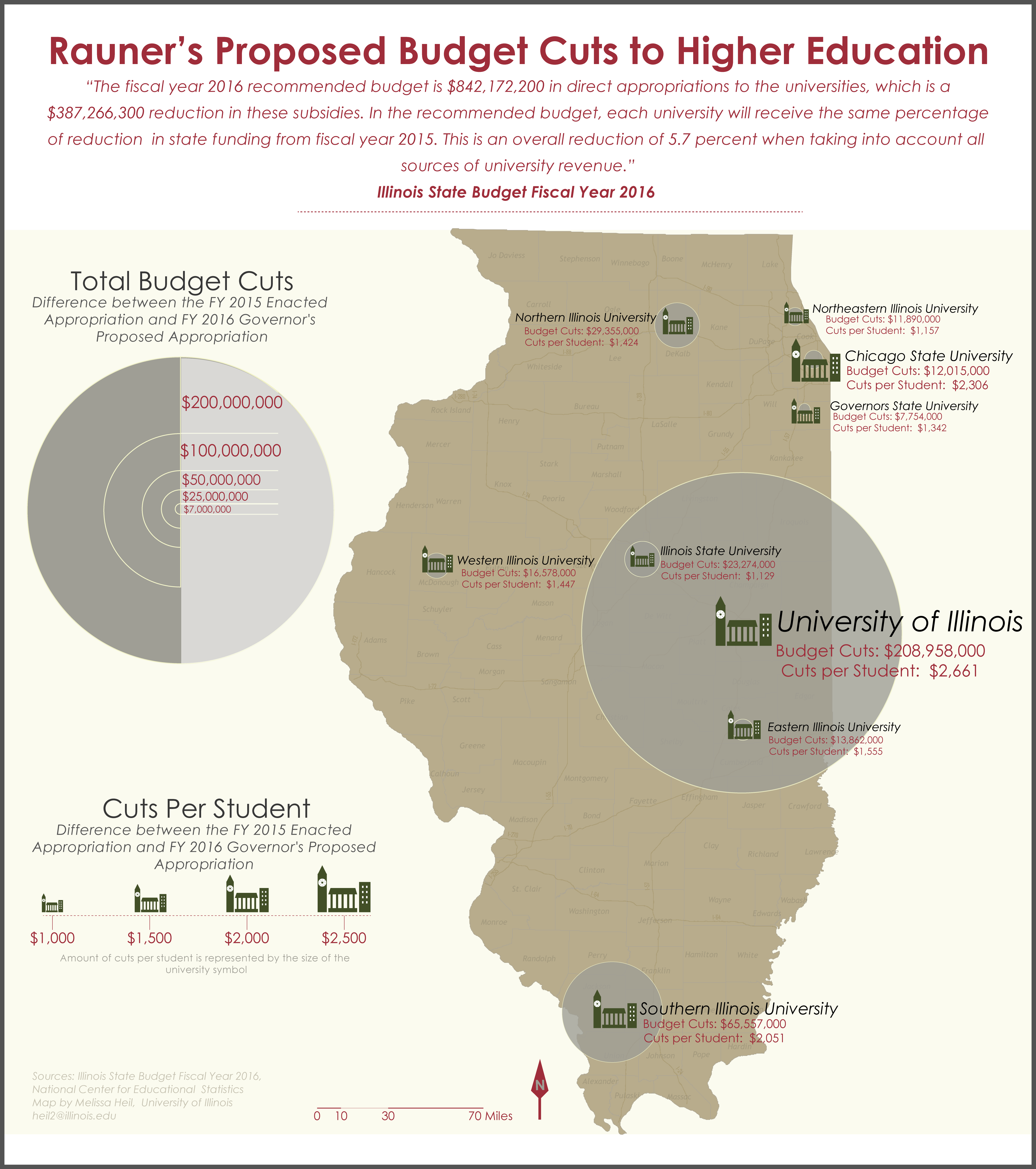
Governor Rauner's proposed budget cuts to higher education

On February 9, 2015, Rauner signed an executive order blocking so called "fair share" union fees from state employee paychecks. The same day, Rauner hired a legal team headed by former U.S. Attorney Dan Webb and his law firm Winston & Strawn to file a declaratory judgment action in Federal Court to affirm his action. In February 2015, Rauner proposed $4.1 billion in budget cuts affecting higher education, Medicaid, state employee pensions, public transit, and local government support. In April, Rauner also suspended funding for programs addressing domestic violence, homeless youth, autism, and immigrant integration. Critics called these moves "morally reprehensible" and harmful to the state economy.

On June 25, 2015, Rauner vetoed the Illinois state budget passed by the legislature, which would have created a deficit of nearly $4 billion but which covered what Illinois Democratic lawmakers called "vital services". He stated that he would not sign a budget until the Democratic state legislature passed his "Turnaround Agenda" to reduce trade union power and freeze property taxes. With no state budget, social service agencies cut back on services, state universities laid off staff, public transit service ceased in Monroe and Randolph Counties, and Child Care Assistance eligibility was cut by 90%.

On June 30, 2016, just before the beginning of the next fiscal year, Rauner signed a temporary bipartisan stopgap budget that would allow public schools to continue operating for an additional year and for necessary state services to continue for 6 months. However, the stopgap budget covered only 65% of social services agencies' normally allocated funds and provided $900,000 less for colleges and universities than FY15, while attempting to cover eighteen months' worth of expenses, all while continuing the uncertainty that Illinois nonprofits faced during FY16.

In July 2017, Rauner vetoed a budget that increased the state income tax from 3.75% to 4.95% and the corporate tax from 5.25% to 7%, an increase of $5 billion in additional tax revenue. However, the Illinois legislature, with the help of several Republicans, overrode his veto. Following this action, considered a political defeat for Rauner, he made major changes to his staff; among others, he fired his chief of staff, deputy chief of staff, and spokesperson, and replaced them with high-ranking officials from the Illinois Policy Institute along with a former spokesperson for Wisconsin governor Scott Walker. These moves were seen by the media as a shift to the right. In August 2017, Rauner fired several of those new officials after they issued a controversial statement related to race.

=== Education ===
Rauner made a priority to fully fund education for the first time in years, increasing K-12 education funding by nearly $1 billion, and increasing early childhood education funding to historically high levels. In 2017, Rauner signed Senate Bill 1947, which moved Illinois to an "evidence-based model" of education funding, taking into account each district's individual needs, as well as its local revenue sources, when appropriating state aid – prioritizing districts that are furthest from being fully funded. The new law created a scholarship plan that earmarked up to $75 million for scholarship tax credits. Lawmakers said those credits would go to low- and middle-income parents, impacting roughly 6,000 private school students whose families make less than $73,000 per year. The new law created the first revision in two decades of the way general state-aid dollars to schools were distributed, establishing a multifaceted procedure for determining need and setting a goal for "adequacy" of funding in each of the state's 852 school districts. The bill received praise from the Chicago Tribune, Daily Herald, and Chicago Sun-Times, along with numerous civic organizations.

=== Unions ===
Rauner said that local governments should be allowed to pass right to work laws. In addition, Rauner said that the state should ban some political contributions by public unions, saying, "government unions should not be allowed to influence the public officials they are lobbying, and sitting across the bargaining table from, through campaign donations and expenditures".

In 2014, Rauner's election campaign was helped financially by Kenneth C. Griffin, CEO of Citadel, who made a rare and impassioned plea to a sold-out audience at the Economic Club of Chicago (ECC) in May 2013 to replace the Democrats at all levels of governance. He supported Rauner's campaign promises to "cut spending and overhaul the state's pension system, impose term limits, and weaken public employee unions". Griffin called for a show of financial support to Rauner that met with an increase in campaign donations representing tens of millions of dollars, or half the $65 million spent on Rauner's 2014 election campaign. Of this half, such money originated from Rauner himself along with "nine other individuals, families, or companies they control".

=== Minimum wage ===
Rauner received media attention for his political stance on the minimum wage. Rauner favored either raising the national minimum wage so Illinois employers were on the same level as those in neighboring states, or unilaterally raising Illinois' minimum wage, but pairing the change with pro-business reforms to the state's tax code, workers compensation reform, and tort reform.

Rauner's position on the minimum wage changed significantly during his campaign. At a candidate forum on December 11, 2013, Rauner stated that he would favor reducing Illinois's minimum wage from $8.25 to the federal minimum wage of $7.25. The Chicago Sun-Times also uncovered video of Rauner at a campaign event in September 2013, where he said that he was "adamantly, adamantly against raising the minimum wage", and audio of an interview with Rauner from January 10, 2014, when he said: "I have said, on a number of occasions, that we could have a lower minimum wage or no minimum wage as part of increasing Illinois' competitiveness."

=== Tax policy ===
Rauner strongly opposed Governor Pat Quinn's proposal to make the 2011 temporary income tax increase permanent, instead calling for the Illinois' income tax rate to gradually be rolled back to 3%. On January 1, 2015, the income tax increase automatically decreased, with the personal income tax rate falling from 5% to 3.75% and the corporate tax rate from 7% to 5.25%.

In July 2014, Rauner called for expanding Illinois' sales tax to dozens of services, such as legal services, accounting services, and computer programming, which were not subject to the sales tax in Illinois. Rauner estimated the expanded sales tax would bring in an additional $600 million a year. Rauner's services tax proposal was harshly criticized by Quinn, who said it would fall hardest on low income people.

Rauner opposed a graduated income tax.

Rauner received a 92% approval from the right-wing, anti-tax lobby group Taxpayers United for America, the first time a sitting Illinois governor received a score of more than 70% from that organization.

=== Term limits ===
Rauner strongly favored term limits, and pledged to limit himself to no more than eight years as governor. He organized and funded a push to put a constitutional amendment imposing term limits on Illinois legislators on the November 2014 ballot, gathering 591,092 signatures. The term limits amendment was struck down in court as unconstitutional.

=== Infrastructure and transportation ===
During his 2014 campaign, Rauner called for "billions" of dollars per year in public spending on infrastructure. He declined to detail how he would pay for the spending.

Also during his campaign, Rauner declined to take a position on the Illiana Expressway and Peotone Airport projects advanced by Quinn. After taking office in 2015, he suspended the Illiana project, pending a cost-benefit review.

In February 2015, Rauner proposed increasing funding for highways and slashing funding for public transport, which he saw as inefficient spending.

=== Gun control ===
Rauner stated that while he wanted laws and policies to keep guns out of the hands of criminals and the mentally ill, he would not go beyond that due to constitutional concerns.

=== Abortion ===
Rauner has a record of supporting abortion rights. The Rauner family has donated "thousands of dollars" to Planned Parenthood, and prior to his 2014 campaign, the Rauner Family Foundation donated $510,000 to the American Civil Liberties Union's Roger Baldwin Foundation.

On July 29, 2016, Rauner signed S.B. 1564 into law, which required doctors and pregnancy centers that refuse to perform abortions for religious or moral reasons to refer patients to places where they could have an abortion. The bill was passed on partisan lines, with no Republican legislators voting for the bill. Rauner's decision to sign the bill into law angered conservative groups. The same day, Rauner also signed a bill that extended insurance coverage for nearly all contraceptives. On August 5, Rauner was sued by a crisis pregnancy center, a Rockford, Illinois-based medical center, and a Downers Grove physician, claiming that SB 1564 was unconstitutional. On December 20, 2016, a Winnebago County Circuit Judge issued a preliminary injunction, which temporarily prohibited the State of Illinois from enforcing the law after it went into effect on January 1, 2017.

As a candidate in 2014, Rauner stated that he opposed the existing Illinois law that restricted abortion coverage under Medicaid and the state employee health plan. In April 2017, however, Rauner pledged to veto an abortion rights bill that would (a) remove those abortion coverage restrictions: and (b) repeal an Illinois law making abortion illegal if Roe v. Wade were to be overturned. Despite his veto pledge, Rauner signed the abortion rights bill into law on September 28, 2017, earning him harsh criticism from conservative Republicans.

=== Death penalty ===
In 2018, Rauner called for the death penalty to be revived along with imposing it on people convicted of killing police officers.

=== Anti-BDS laws ===
On July 23, 2015, Illinois became the first state in the US to explicitly punish boycotts of Israel as the bill SB 1761 was signed into law by Rauner. The law sets up a blacklist of non-American companies that boycott Israel and requires the state's pension funds to divest from them.

=== Voting laws ===
On August 12, 2016, Rauner vetoed a bill that would have automatically registered as a voter anyone in Illinois who sought a new or updated drivers license as well as other services, unless they chose to opt out. Rauner said that he supported automatic voter registration, but that he vetoed the bill because he was worried that "the bill would inadvertently open the door to voter fraud and run afoul of federal election law". On August 28, 2017, Rauner signed a revised version of the automatic voter registration bill.

=== Immigration enforcement ===
On August 28, 2017, Rauner signed a bill into law that prohibited state and local police from arresting anyone solely due to their immigration status or due to federal detainers. Some Republicans criticized Rauner for his action, saying that the bill made Illinois a sanctuary state. On November 15, 2017, the United States Department of Justice announced that a preliminary conclusion had been reached that Illinois was now a sanctuary jurisdiction in violation of 8 U.S.C. 1373 and issued a warning to state authorities on the issue. Subsequently, as of June 10, 2018, there is still no evidence that Illinois responded stating that it was in compliance with the law. The deadline to do so was December 8, 2017.

=== Same-sex marriage and LGBT rights ===
Rauner supports same-sex marriage. As a gubernatorial candidate in 2014, he said that he had no comment on same-sex marriage but would not change the law legalizing gay marriages. In 2015, Rauner signed legislation banning the use of conversion therapy on minors. He also signed a bill making it easier for transgender people to change their birth certificates. He also marched in Aurora and Chicago LGBT pride parades. In 2018, Rauner officiated the wedding of a same-sex couple.

=== 2018 re-election campaign ===
On June 20, 2016, Rauner confirmed that he would run for a second term; he formally announced his re-election campaign on October 23, 2017. In the Republican primary, Rauner faced State Representative Jeanne Ives, who ran against him from the political right. Rauner was endorsed by the Chicago Tribune, The Daily Herald, and the Chicago Sun-Times, and by 37 elected officials from DuPage County, part of which was represented by Ives. On March 20, 2018, Rauner narrowly won the Republican primary, with 52% of the vote; Ives received 48% of the vote. In the November general election, Rauner lost to Democratic nominee JB Pritzker; Pritzker received 55% of the vote while Rauner received 39%. It was the most lopsided margin in an Illinois gubernatorial race since Jim Edgar's bid for a second term in 1994 and the lowest percentage of the vote received by a Republican candidate since 1912.

== Personal life ==
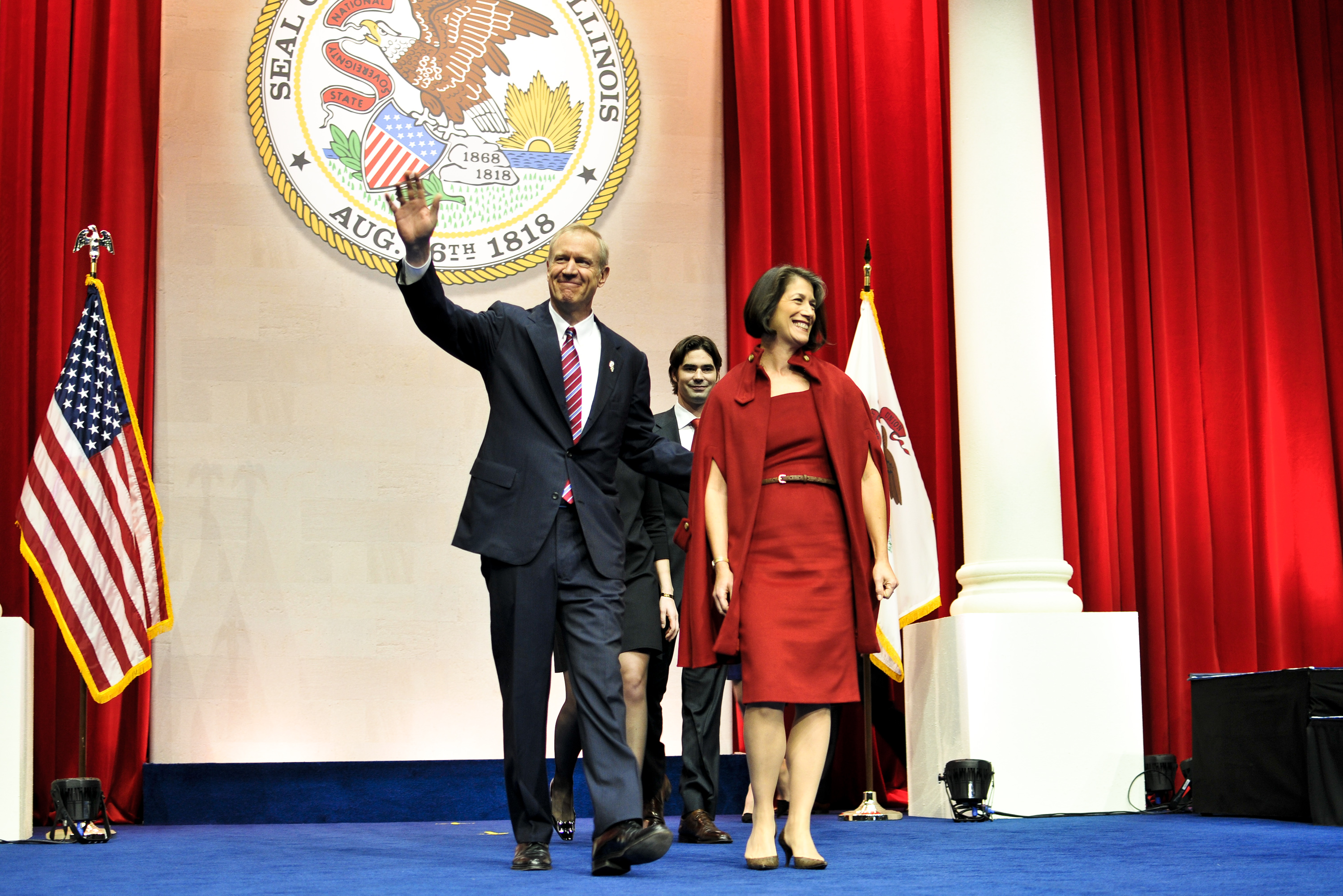
Rauner and his wife in January 2015

Before being elected governor, Rauner resided in Winnetka, Illinois, with his wife, Diana Mendley Rauner, and family; they have three children. He also has three children from his first marriage, to Elizabeth Konker Wessel, whom he married in 1980, separated from in 1990, and was legally divorced from in 1993.

During Rauner's governorship, he and his family resided in the Illinois Governor's Mansion in Springfield. They also own ranches in Montana and Wyoming. Rauner is an Episcopalian.

Rauner's exact net worth is unclear, but has been estimated at being at least several hundred million dollars. During his campaign for governor he promised that he would accept only $1 in salary and no benefits from his office, including forgoing a pension and any reimbursement for travel expenses.

After losing the 2018 election, Rauner moved to Florida. By August 2020, he was registered to vote in Florida rather than Illinois. Rauner made a $250,000 campaign donation to Ron DeSantis in March 2021.

== Electoral history ==
Illinois gubernatorial Republican primary, 2014
Party	Candidate	Votes	%
Republican	Bruce Rauner	328,934	40.13
Republican	Kirk W. Dillard	305,120	37.22
Republican	Bill Brady	123,708	15.09
Republican	Dan Rutherford	61,948	7.56
Total votes		819,710	100.0

Illinois gubernatorial election, 2014
Party	Candidate	Votes	%
Republican	Bruce Rauner (Evelyn Sanguinetti)	1,823,627	50.27
Democratic	Pat Quinn (incumbent) (Paul Vallas)	1,681,343	46.35
Libertarian	Chad Grimm (Alex Cummings)	121,534	3.35
Write-in		1,186	0.03
Total votes		3,627,690	100.0

Illinois gubernatorial Republican primary, 2018
Party	Candidate	Votes	%
Republican	Bruce Rauner (incumbent)	372,124	51.53
Republican	Jeanne Ives	350,038	48.47
Total votes		722,162	100.0

Illinois gubernatorial election, 2018
Party	Candidate	Votes	%
Democratic	JB Pritzker (Juliana Stratton)	2,479,746	54.53
Republican	Bruce Rauner (Evelyn Sanguinetti) (incumbent)	1,765,751	38.83
Conservative	William "Sam" McCann (Aaron Mereighn)	192,557	4.23
Libertarian	Grayson Kash Jackson (Sanj Mohip)	109,518	2.41
Write-in		115	0.00
Total votes		4,547,657	100.0

Party political offices
Preceded by Bill Brady	Republican nominee for Governor of Illinois; 2014, 2018	Succeeded by Darren Bailey
Political offices
Preceded by Pat Quinn	Governor of Illinois; 2015–2019	Succeeded by J. B. Pritzker
U.S. order of precedence (ceremonial)
Preceded by Pat Quinn as Former Governor	Order of precedence of the United States; Within Illinois	Succeeded by Jack Markell as Former Governor
Preceded by Pat Quinn as Former Governor	Order of precedence of the United States; Outside Illinois	Succeeded by Fob James as Former Governor
