= Evelyn Sanguinetti =

American politician (born 1970)

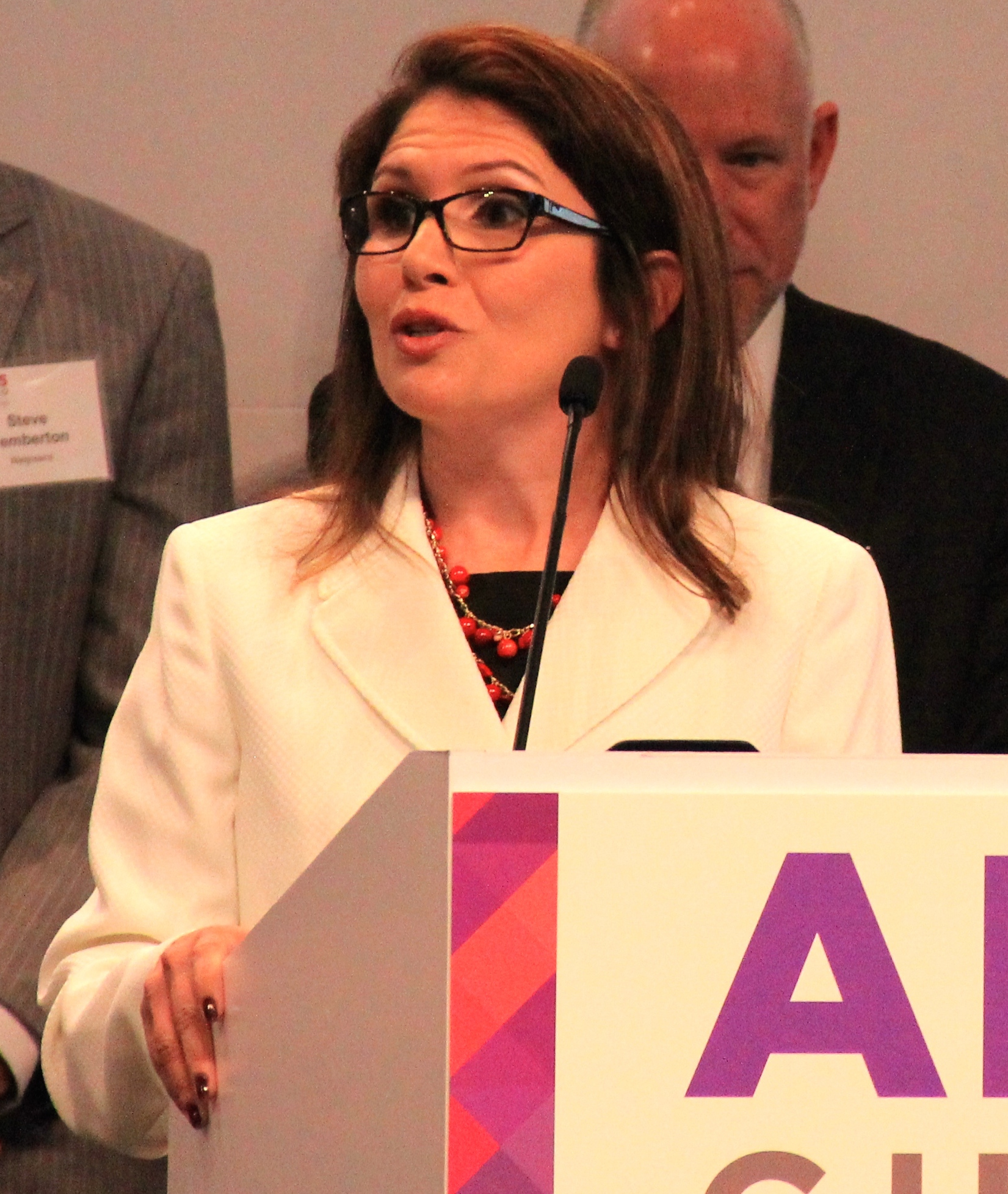
- Sanguinetti in 2015

47th Lieutenant Governor of Illinois
- In office January 12, 2015 – January 14, 2019
- Governor: Bruce Rauner
- Preceded by: Sheila Simon
- Succeeded by: Juliana Stratton

Personal details
- Born: Evelyn Pacino; November 12, 1970 (age 55) Hialeah, Florida, U.S.
- Party: Republican
- Spouse: Raymond Sanguinetti
- Children: 3
- Education: Florida International University (BM); John Marshall Law School, Chicago (JD)

Evelyn Sanguinetti (née Pacino; born November 12, 1970) is an American politician and lawyer who served as the 47th lieutenant governor of Illinois from 2015 to 2019 under Governor Bruce Rauner. A member of the Republican Party, she previously served on the Wheaton City Council. Sanguinetti announced her candidacy for the 2020 election in Illinois's 6th congressional district, challenging first-term Democratic incumbent Sean Casten, but dropped out on October 11, 2019. As of 2025, she and Rauner are the most recent Republicans to have won or held statewide office in Illinois.

== Biography ==
Sanguinetti was born in Hialeah, Florida (near Miami) to a Cuban mother and Ecuadorian father. Sanguinetti's mother was a Cuban political refugee who was able to escape Cuba by way of Puerto Rico in the early 1960s before settling in the mainland United States. Sanguinetti's father immigrated to South Florida in 1966 with his mother and brothers and ultimately settled in Hialeah. Sanguinetti's mother and father married in 1970, and Sanguinetti was born on November 12, 1970, when her mother was only 15. On her election, Sanguinetti became the first Hispanic Lieutenant Governor of Illinois as well as the first Latina Lieutenant Governor in the United States.

== Early life and education ==
Growing up in extreme poverty, Sanguinetti relied on government assistance for food and housing. Her first language was Spanish. Sanguinetti struggled in school, but ultimately found her footing in music through the piano. Sanguinetti's first break came when she earned a place in the prestigious New World School of the Arts, a magnet school for the arts in Miami. There she developed her musical skills and focused on piano performance and voice.

Sanguinetti went on to attend Florida International University (FIU) and earned a bachelor's degree in music. She attempted to further a career in music by auditioning into the Manhattan School of Music, the Peabody Institute, and Jacobs School of Music. Not receiving the reception that she had hoped for and not having the financial resources, Sanguinetti decided to pursue a career in the law. Sanguinetti attended John Marshall Law School in Chicago.

While in law school, Sanguinetti joined the Moot Court Executive Board and the John Marshall Law School Fair Housing Legal Clinic. She served as President of the Hispanic Student Association and the Fair Housing Association. Through her work at The John Marshall Law School Fair Housing Legal Clinic she was able to practice law pursuant to Illinois Supreme Court Rule 711, and represented victims of housing discrimination. While a student she successfully handled the first ever case at the Chicago Commission on Human Relations that established a precedent for discrimination based on source of income. McCutchen v. Robinson, CCHR No. 95-I-1-84.

== Professional career ==
Sanguinetti graduated from The John Marshall Law School in 1998, and became a state Assistant Attorney General under during the tenure of then state Attorney General Jim Ryan.

After leaving the Attorney General's office in 2003, Sanguinetti practiced law in Chicago at private law firms representing police officers and other first responders in the United States District Court for the Northern District of Illinois.

While practicing law, Sanguinetti went on to become an adjunct professor of law at John Marshall Law School.

== Public service ==
In 2007, Sanguinetti was diagnosed with multiple sclerosis after an accident on a municipal sidewalk in Wheaton, Illinois. In 2011, when Sanguinetti was able to regain her ability to walk for sustained periods of time, Sanguinetti decided to run for an At-Large position on the Wheaton City Council on a platform of infrastructure improvements and sidewalk maintenance.

Sanguinetti won the election and served on the Wheaton City Council until December 2014 when she resigned to become Illinois Lieutenant Governor. Her tenure was marked by renewed investment into the city's infrastructure and fiscal responsibility.

In October 2013, Sangunetti was selected to be the Lieutenant Governor running mate for Republican nominee Bruce Rauner. Sanguinetti won the Republican Primary in February 2014, and became the party's nominee for Lieutenant Governor. In November 2014 The ticket of Rauner and Sanguinetti defeated the Democratic ticket of Pat Quinn and Paul Vallas, and Sanguinetti was thus elected to be the 47th Lieutenant Governor of the State of Illinois.

=== Government consolidation ===
Illinois' Local Government Consolidation and Unfunded Mandates Task Force was created under Executive Order 15-15, and Sanguinetti chaired and oversaw this task force.

From the report the task force produced a number of its recommendations subsequently became law;

- PA 99-0353: Four-year moratorium on creating new local governments
- PA 100-106: Township consolidation reform: road and bridge district consolidation
- PA 100-107: Township consolidation reform: DuPage County consolidation expansion, coterminous township consolidation expansion, 126-mile township square mile consolidation limit removed, county form of government retention after abolishing townships
- PA 100-242: Unfunded mandate statewide cost of compliance estimates by DCEO
- PA 100-0465: Education unfunded mandate; driver's education third-party contracting and physical education

=== Illinois waterways ===
Sanguinetti, as Lieutenant Governor, chaired the Mississippi, Illinois, Wabash and Ohio Rivers Coordinating Councils. Sanguinetti took an active role in advocating Illinois' approach to the management and elimination of the Asian Carp invasive species population in Illinois waterways, while balancing the interests of Illinois' business, agriculture and shipping industries. Sanguinetti worked with the U.S. Army Corps of Engineers to help keep the invasive species out of Lake Michigan.

=== Military affairs ===
Illinois is home to three large military bases: Scott Air Force Base near Belleville; Rock Island Arsenal near Rock Island; and Naval Station Great Lakes near North Chicago. Sanguinetti chaired the Military Economic Development Committee (formerly known as the Interagency Military Base Support and Economic Development Committee) which coordinates the State's activities on and to act as a communication center for issues relating to current and former military bases in the State of Illinois. Sanguinetti worked with the Illinois General Assembly to help re-institute the committee and expand its use to preserve economic development associated with Illinois' military bases.

=== Opioid epidemic ===
Sanguinetti chaired the Opioid Prevention and Intervention Task Force for the State of Illinois. One of the results of the Task Force was to make the opioid overdose reversal drug naloxone, commonly called Narcan, available without a prescription. The Task Force also led to the creation of the launched a 24-hour helpline and website (www.helplineIL.org) for victims of the epidemic to find help. Sanguinetti worked to have two bills signed into law: SB 772 that requires physicians to use the Illinois Prescription Monitoring Program to guard against doctor shopping; and SB 336 to allow those prescribed addicted opioids for pain to exchange those prescriptions for medical cannabis.

=== Angel Investment Tax Credit for minority owned businesses ===
Sanguinetti led a bipartisan effort to revive the Angel Investment Tax Credit in Illinois which helps small minority owned businesses. Sanguinetti, who chaired the Governor's Rural Affairs Council, worked with several state legislators on this bill, including Sen. Chuck Weaver (R-37), Sen. Dale Fowler (R-59), Sen. Daniel Biss (D-9), Rep. Grant Wehrli (R-41), Rep. Carol Sente (D59), Rep. Jaime Andrade Jr. (D-40) and Rep. Elgie Sims (D-34).

== Post elective office ==
In 2020, after leaving public office and briefly running for Congress, Sanguinetti became the executive director of Hope Fair Housing, a fair housing organization that was founded in 1968 with passage of the Federal Fair Housing Act and in the aftermath of the assassination of Dr. Martin Luther King, Jr. In 2022, Sanguinetti left her position as executive director to run for DuPage County Clerk.

== Personal life ==
She is married with three children and lives in Wheaton, Illinois.

== See also ==
- List of female lieutenant governors in the United States
- List of minority governors and lieutenant governors in the United States

Party political offices
Preceded by Jason Plummer	Republican nominee for Lieutenant Governor of Illinois; 2014, 2018	Succeeded by Stephanie Trussell
Political offices
Preceded by Sheila Simon	Lieutenant Governor of Illinois; 2015–2019	Succeeded by Juliana Stratton
