= Peter Breen (Illinois politician) =

American politician

Member of the Illinois House of Representatives from the 48th district
- In office January 14, 2015 – January 9, 2019
- Preceded by: Sandra M. Pihos
- Succeeded by: Terra Costa Howard

Personal details
- Party: Republican
- Spouse: Margie
- Education: Vanderbilt University (B.Eng.); Notre Dame Law School (J.D.)

Peter Breen is a former Republican member of the Illinois House of Representatives who represented the 48th district from 2015 until 2019. The 48th district included municipalities in DuPage County including all or parts of Lombard, Glen Ellyn, Wheaton, and Lisle.

Breen earned his Bachelor of Engineering in Electrical Engineering from Vanderbilt University and his J.D. from the University of Notre Dame. Prior to election to the Illinois Legislature he was employed as the Vice President and Senior Counsel of the Thomas More Society. He served as a trustee on the Lombard Village Board and served as Lombard's Acting Village President.

Breen defeated six-term incumbent State Representative Sandra M. Pihos in the Republican primary in March 2014 with 56% of the vote. He won the general election against a write-in candidate with about 91% of the vote according to preliminary election results. In 2018, Breen lost reelection to Terra Costa Howard in a year that saw numerous suburban Republicans lose at the polls. In 2020, Breen lost again to Costa Howard.

As of March 2023 Breen is Executive Vice President and Head of Litigation at the Thomas More Society.

Breen represents a Texas man who in 2023 sued his ex-wife's friends that helped with her abortion. Breen says that through this lawsuit, it might also be possible to also sue the manufacturers and distributors of abortion medication. Legal scholar Melissa Murray viewed the suit also as an attempt to get the Texas courts to recognize fetal personhood.
